= Geste du roi =

The Geste du roi is the title of one of the literary cycles that compose the Chansons de Geste. In the Chansons of the Geste du roi, the chief character is usually Charlemagne or one of his immediate successors. A pervasive theme is the King's role as champion of Christianity. This cycle contains the first of the chansons to be written down, the Chanson de Roland or The Song of Roland.

== The Chansons ==
- Chanson de Roland (c. 1100 for the Oxford text, the earliest written version); several other versions exist, including the Occitan Ronsasvals, the Middle High German Ruolandsliet and the Latin Carmen de Prodicione Guenonis.
- Le Pèlerinage de Charlemagne or Voyage de Charlemagne à Jérusalem et à Constantinople dealing with a fictional expedition by Charlemagne and his knights (c. 1140; two 15th-century reworkings)
- Fierabras (c. 1170)
- Aspremont (c. 1190); a later version formed the basis of Aspramonte by Andrea da Barberino
- Anseïs de Carthage (c. 1200)
- Chanson de Saisnes or "Song of the Saxons", by Jean Bodel (c. 1200)
- Huon de Bordeaux originally c. 1215–1240, known from slightly later manuscripts. A "prequel" and four sequels were later added:
  - Auberon
  - Chanson d'Esclarmonde
  - Clarisse et Florent
  - Yde et Olive
  - Godin
- Gaydon (c. 1230)
- Jehan de Lanson (before 1239)
- Berthe aux Grands Pieds by Adenet le Roi (c. 1275), and a later Franco-Italian reworking
- Les Enfances Ogier by Adenet le Roi (c. 1275) | to Ogier the Dane.
- Entrée d'Espagne (c. 1320)
- Hugues Capet (c. 1360)
- Galiens li Restorés known from a single manuscript of about 1490
- Aiquin or Acquin
- Otuel or Otinel
- Mainet
- Basin
- Ogier le Danois by Raimbert de Paris
- Gui de Bourgogne
- Macaire or La Chanson de la Reine Sebile
- Huon d'Auvergne, a lost chanson known from a 16th-century retelling. The hero is mentioned among epic heroes in the Ensenhamen of Guiraut de Cabrera, and figures as a character in Mainet
