= Karlamagnús saga =

Old Norse thirteenth-century prose compilation

The Karlamagnús saga, also called Karlamagnussaga or Karlamagnus-saga ("saga of Charlemagne") was a late-thirteenth-century Norse prose compilation and adaptation, made for Haakon V of Norway, of the Old French chansons de geste of the Matter of France dealing with Charlemagne and his paladins. In some cases, the Karlamagnús saga remains the only source for otherwise-lost Old French epics.

== The ten branches ==
The vast work is divided into 10 chapters, or "branches," as follows:

- I. "Karlamagnus" (Upphaf Karlamagnúss)
  Or "Charlemagne’s Early Life," a digested account of Charlemagne and his knights. Includes a version of the tale of the thief Basin, which has not survived in French.
- II. "Lady Olif and Landres her Son" (Af frú Ólif ok Landrés syni hennar)
  Based on an English version (of the lost Dame Olive et Landri), according to the author; it is an adaptation of the French chanson de geste Doon de la Roche a work also known in medieval Spain under the title Historia de Enrique, Fi de Oliva;
- III. "Oddgeir the Dane" (Af Oddgeiri dansks)
  Adaptation of La Chevalerie Ogier de Danemarche, recounting the exploits of Ogier the Dane;
- IV. "King Agulandus" (Af Agulando konungi & Ferakuts þáttr)
  Lengthiest branch by far, chronicling Charlemagne and Roland's battle with Agulandus (Agolant), his son Jamund, and the giant Ferragut, attempting to stitch together accounts from Historia Caroli Magni and a version of Chanson d'Aspremont;
- V. "Gvitalin the Saxon" (Af Gvitalín Saxa)
  An account of a campaign against the Saxons, related to Jean Bodel's Chanson de Saisnes;
- VI. "Otuel" (Af Otúel)
  A version of the French poem Chanson d'Otinel;
- VII. "The Journey to Jerusalem" (Af Jórsalaferð)
  A "very close translation" of an identified Anglo-Norman manuscript of the Le Pèlerinage de Charlemagne;
- VIII. "The Battle of Runzival" (Af Runzival Bardaga)
  A version of The Song of Roland textually close (although with a few notable differences) to the Oxford manuscript;
- IX. "William Short-Nose" (Af Vilhjálmi korneis)
  A rendition of the Moniage Guillaume of the Guillaume d'Orange cycle;
- X. "Miracles and Signs" (Um kraptaverk ok jartegnir)
  Or "The Death of Charlemagne." Based on the account in Vincent de Beauvais’s Speculum historiale.

== Translations ==
A modern English translation of the work, in three volumes, was completed by Constance B. Hieatt, with copious notes and index.

The saga was translated into Swedish verse in the fourteenth century as Karl Magnus. It was also given an abridged translation into Danish as Karl Magnus Krønike, with the earliest manuscript dating to 1480, followed by printed versions.

Roland og Magnus kongen is the only Norwegian ballad to have been composed out of the saga, based on Branch VIII.

== Holy war ==
The fear of a common enemy united the Christian fighters in Holy War. If the noble goals of religious war are abandoned, the author cautions that Christian forces will fail against the Saracens. Agulandus þáttr gives an example of the breakdown of class differences and routine disagreements for the duration of Christians' war against "infidels":

should all vandals and robbers reenter freedom and grace if they were ready to henceforth desist from the behavior and join God's knights, and he vowed to them to grant them again property that earlier had been lost and to make the poor rich.

It describes the Saracen warriors as "strangely dressed in a Saracen way, horned, and like devils, sharply striking tambourines". In this way they panic the Christian cavalry who lose control of their horses, forcing the Christian knights to withdraw temporarily. According to the chronicle King Karlamagnus is victorious in battle the following day receiving the baptism of the enemy king and taking the city of Cordova as a fiefdom.

== See also ==
- Chivalric sagas
