= Oliver (paladin) =

Knight in the Matter of France

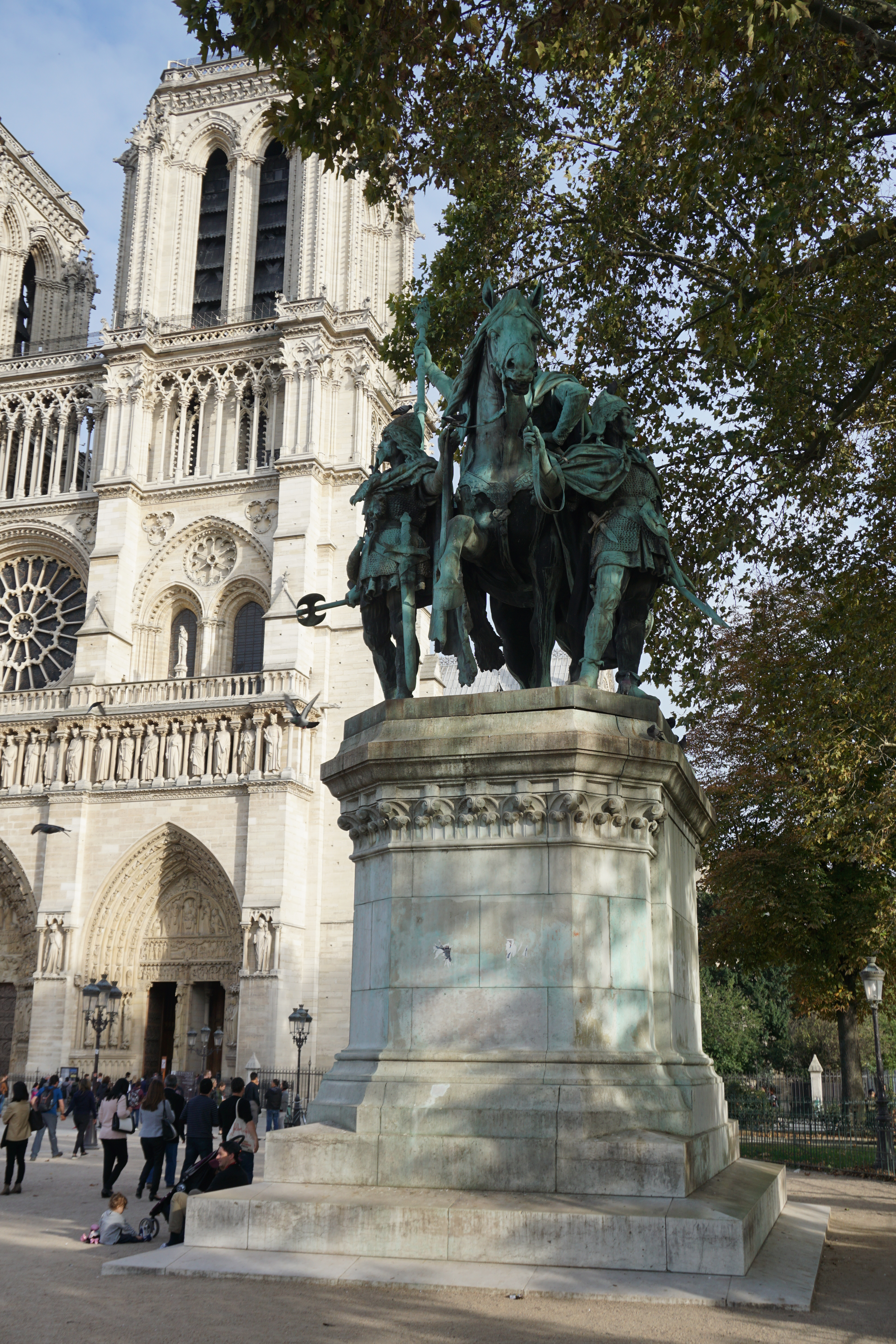
Oliver (right) depicted on the monument of Charlemagne et ses Leudes in Paris

Oliver (in Italian: Uliviero or Oliviero), sometimes referred to as Olivier de Vienne or de Gennes, is a legendary knight in the Matter of France chansons de geste, especially the French epic The Song of Roland. In the tradition, he was Roland's closest friend, advisor, confidant and brother-in-law to be, one of Charlemagne's twelve peers and brother of Aude, Roland's betrothed. He dies with Roland at the Battle of Roncevaux Pass. Some critics have linked his name to the olive tree, a biblical symbol of divine wisdom.

== Oliver in the Song of Roland ==
Whereas the portrayal of Roland is commonly seen as recklessly courageous, Oliver was said to exhibit poise and wisdom in combat. He tells Roland that "heroism tempered with common sense is a far cry from madness: "Reasonableness is to be preferred to recklessness" (Oxford manuscript, laisse 131). Oliver was fatally impaled from behind by the Saracen Marganice, but before dying, he used his sword, Hauteclere, to split his attacker's head open with one blow.

Oliver's sword Hauteclere (or Halteclere, Hauteclaire) is described as being of burnished steel, with a crystal embedded in a golden hilt.

== Oliver in other works ==
Aside from the Song of Roland, the most pivotal chanson in which Oliver appears is Girart de Vienne (c.1180) by Bertrand de Bar-sur-Aube. Oliver's uncle Girart is fighting against his suzerain Charlemagne; after seven years of constant warfare, the two sides agree to a duel between two champions which will decide the outcome. From Vienne, Oliver is chosen, and from France, Roland. The two fight a duel but cannot overcome each other. Each recognising the other's prowess and nobility, they swear friendship to each other, and help bring about peace between their uncles.

In Roland a Saragosse, Oliver appears as Roland's friend and also something of a caretaker, assigned by Charlemagne to watch out for the younger and somewhat impetuous Roland. In the story, Roland is invited by Brammimonde, the queen of the Moors, to visit her at Saragossa. He and Oliver ride to the city without Roland telling Oliver the nature of his errand. As the two look out over the city, Roland asks Oliver to promise him a favour. Oliver, not suspecting any foul play, readily agrees, rather like an older brother to a younger. Roland asks Oliver to not accompany him into Saragosse so that Roland can claim all the glory and all the Queen's favor for himself. He leaves an outraged Oliver behind and succeeds in finding the queen and receiving a magnificent cloak from her. However, as he attempts to escape Saragossa Roland is surrounded by Saracens. He calls to Oliver for help, but the latter does not budge from his hill. Only when Roland is unhorsed and seems in grave danger of capture does Oliver, after a little more hesitation, ride down to the battle. He kills many Saracens and then leads a horse to Roland, then leaves the battle again. Then Oliver and his knights angrily leave Charlemagne's camp and capture the minor Saracen city of Gorreya. Roland rides out after them, intending to apologise to Oliver. When he arrives at Gorreya, Oliver disguises himself as a Saracen and goes outside the city to do battle with Roland. Roland knocks Oliver off his horse, but at a signal from Oliver all of the rest of his knights, also disguised as Saracens, exit the city and surround Roland. Just as before, outside Saragossa, Roland is trapped and outnumbered, and this time, realising that Oliver is not there to save him, Roland surrenders. Only then does Oliver remove his disguise and the two are reconciled.

Oliver also appears in a series of chansons concerning the Moorish giant Fierabras, presented as Oliver's rival and near-equal. The story goes: the Saracen king Balan and his 15-foot-tall (4.6 m) son Fierabras return to Spain after sacking the church of Saint Peter's in Rome and taking the relics of the passion. Charlemagne invades Spain to recover the relics and sends his knight Oliver de Vienne, Roland's companion, to battle Fierabras. Once defeated, the giant decides to convert to Christianity and joins Charlemagne's army, but Oliver and several other knights are captured. Floripas, Fierabras' sister, falls in love with one of Charlemagne's knights, Gui de Bourgogne. After a series of adventures, Charlemagne kills king Balan, divides Spain between Fierabras and Gui de Bourgogne (who marries Floripas), and returns to Saint Denis with the holy relics.

In the chanson Galiens li Restorés, Oliver has, with a princess of Byzantium named Jacqueline, a son named Galien. In the story, Galien leaves Constantinople to search for Oliver, and arrives at Roncevaux in time to speak to his dying father. He then returns to Constantinople, where his evil uncles have murdered their father, the Emperor, Galien's grandfather. He defeats them and becomes emperor of Byzantium, at the same time that the trial of Ganelon is taking place in France.

In Le Pèlerinage de Charlemagne, where Charlemagne and his Twelve Peers are hosted by the (fictional) Byzantine Emperor Hugo, Oliver is given the risqué role of vainly boasting that he can sleep with Hugo's daughter a hundred times during a single night, and being ashamed when finding that his boast was overheard by the Emperor's spy. But after Charlemagne and the Peers pray to God in front of holy relics brought from Jerusalem, God enables Oliver to perform as advertised.

Oliver also appears in the Italian romantic epics Morgante by Luigi Pulci, Orlando innamorato by Matteo Maria Boiardo and Orlando furioso by Ludovico Ariosto. In Boiardo and Ariosto, Oliver has two sons: Aquilante and Grifone (their mother is given as Gismonda in Ariosto, xv, 73.)

== In sculpture ==
Oliver is prominently displayed, guiding Charlemagne's horse and holding a pike, on the bronze sculpture Charlemagne et ses Leudes (1878) in front of Notre-Dame de Paris.

Oliver appears in the portal of Verona Cathedral.
