= Ferragut =

Fictional character

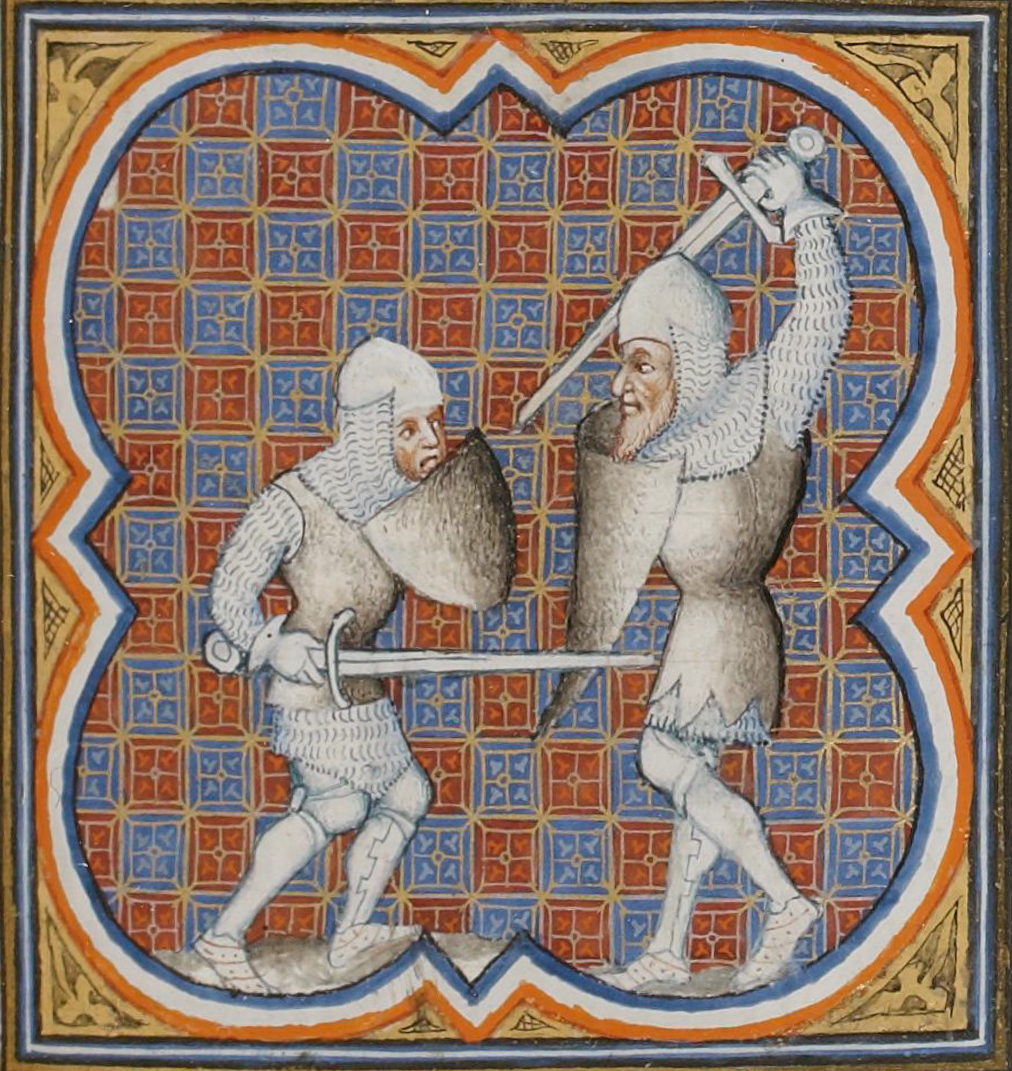
Combat of Roland and the giant Ferragut. Illuminated miniature from Grandes Chroniques de France, c1375-1380 (BnF Français 2813, fol. 118)

Ferragut (also known as Ferragus, Ferracutus, Ferracute, Ferrakut, Ferraguto, Ferraù, Fernagu) was a character—a Saracen paladin, sometimes depicted as a giant—in texts dealing with the Matter of France, including the Historia Caroli Magni, and Italian epics, such as Orlando Innamorato by Matteo Maria Boiardo and Orlando Furioso by Ludovico Ariosto. In the tales, he was portrayed as physically invulnerable except at his navel/stomach, and was eventually killed (or fated to be killed) by the paladin Roland.

== Name ==
"Ferracutus" was the Latin form of the name used in the Pseudo-Turpin Chronicle. Thomas Bulfinch used "Ferragus" in his English adaptation Legends of Charlemagne, but the form "Ferragut" appears to be the most frequent in English today.

In his Orlando innamorato, Matteo Maria Boiardo used Feraguto/Feragu (Ferraguto/Ferragu). Ferraù is a syncopated form used in Orlando furioso by Ludovico Ariosto.

== Texts ==
=== Ferracutus in the "Pseudo-Turpin" Chronicle ===
The character appears in one of the main episodes of the so-called Pseudo-Turpin Chronicle (Historia Caroli Magni, Book IV of the Codex Calixtinus), a Latin chronicle concerning the feats of Charlemagne and the paladin Roland from the middle of the 12th century.

In a story modeled on David and Goliath, Roland battles the Saracen giant Ferracutus, who is holding the city of Nájera (Spain). A descendant of Goliath who had been sent to Nájera from Syria by the Emir of Babylon to fight the Christian army of Charlemagne, the giant Ferracutus didn't fear any arrow or spear and had the strength of forty strong men, was nearly twelve cubits tall, with a face a cubit long, a nose a hand long, members nearly four cubits long and fingers the length of three hands. Charlemagne sent several of his men to fight the giant: Ogier the Dane, Reinaldos of Montalbán, Constantine king of Rome, Count Hoel, and twenty other fighters two by two, who were defeated effortlessly by the giant and put to prison. As soon as Roland obtained permission from Charlemagne, he approached the giant alone and they fought for two days (taking truces to rest at night) using swords, wooden sticks, stones and bare fists. They accidentally killed each other's horses, but Roland could find no way of wounding the giant. During the second night, the courteous Roland placed a stone beneath the head of the giant as a pillow, and upon waking the giant revealed to Roland that he was only vulnerable in one spot: his navel. They also had a conversation about religion discussing matters such as the Holy Trinity, the Genesis, the Immaculate Conception and Resurrection of Jesus. After this conversation another fight took place in which Roland used the knowledge his opponent had given him, and killed Ferragut by inserting a spear in his navel.

The Pseudo-Turpin Chronicle was a massive success throughout Europe and was frequently adapted or borrowed from until the Renaissance.

=== Ferragus in other early modern texts ===
An adaptation of the Pseudo-Turpin story of Ferraguto and his mortal duel with Orlando (Roland) occurs in the anonymous Franco-Venetian epic L'Entrée d'Espagne (c. 1320; the author is thought to be from Padua).

The story also appears in the 14th-century Italian epic La Spagna (attributed to the Florentine Sostegno di Zanobi and likely composed between 1350 and 1360).

Based in part in the Pseudo-Turpin Chronicle (probably via Vincent of Beauvais's Speculum Historiale), Jean or Jehan Bagnyon's 15th-century La Conqueste du grand roy Charlemagne des Espagnes et les vaillances des douze pairs de France, et aussi celles de Fierabras (also called Fierabras) includes the story of Ferragus (Book 3, Part 1, Chapters 10–11). This work knew a European success and was adapted into Castilian, Portuguese, German, and English.

While the incident is not depicted in it, Ferraguto's death at the hands of Orlando is presented as a well-known fact in Luigi Pulci's epic Morgante.

=== Ferraguto in Orlando innamorato ===
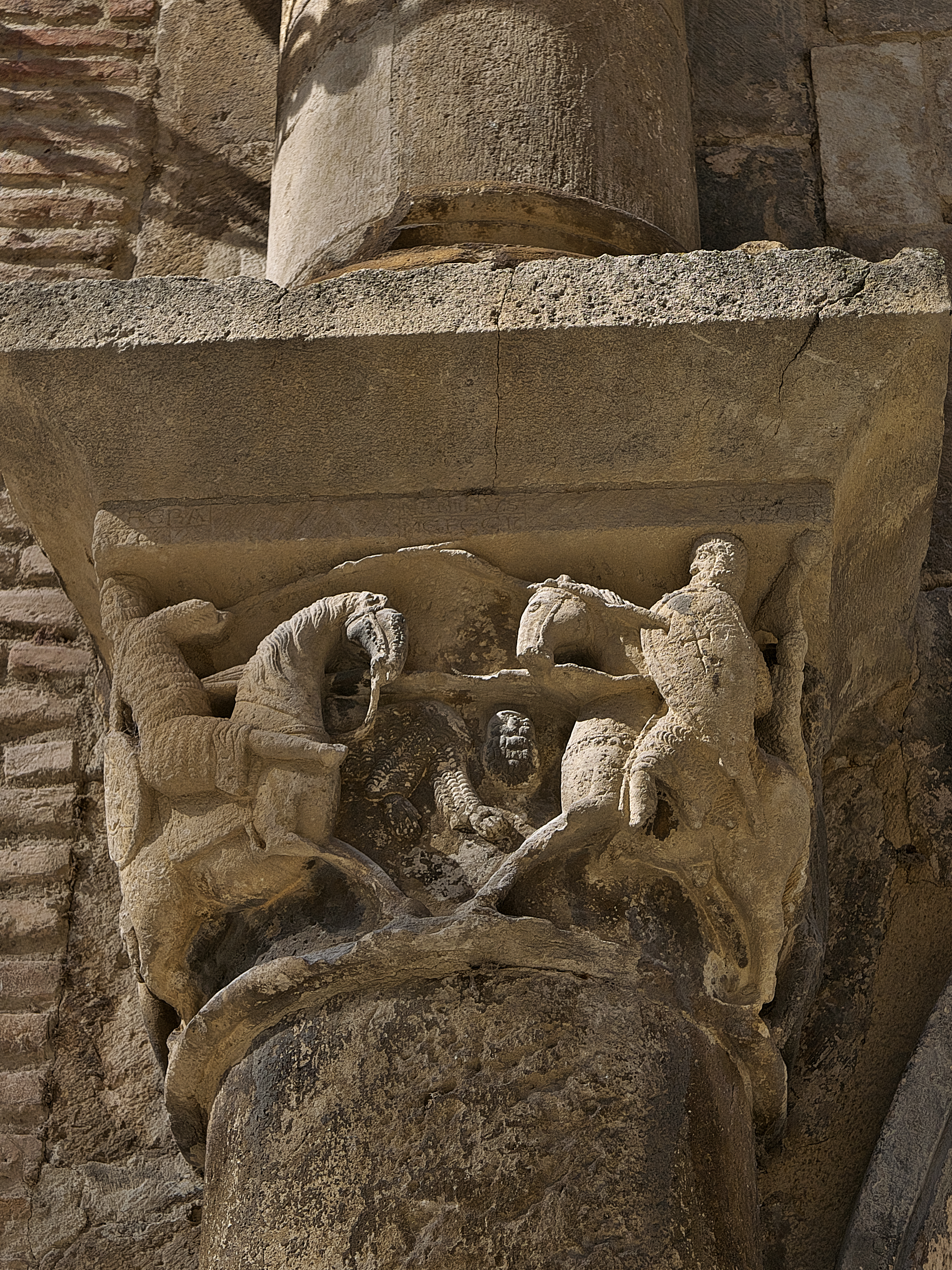
Combat of Roldán and Ferragut (Estella)

In Matteo Maria Boiardo's Orlando innamorato, Ferraguto is a leading Saracen knight (and not a giant), the nephew of King Marsilio of Spain, and one of the many characters passionately in love with Angelica. At the beginning of the poem, Angelica and her brother Argalia arrive at the court of the Emperor Charlemagne in Paris, announcing that any knight who defeats Argalia in single combat will win Angelica's hand in marriage, but if he loses he will become Argalia's prisoner. Ferraguto is among the first knights to try and is unhorsed. However, he angrily refuses to accept his captivity and Argalia and Angelica flee in terror. Ferraguto catches Argalia, kills him and steals his helmet, but he promises the dying man only to wear it for a few days.

=== Ferraù in Orlando furioso ===
At the beginning of Ludovico Ariosto's Orlando Furioso (a continuation of Orlando innamorato), Ferraù loses the helmet in a stream and is confronted by the ghost of Argalia, who tells him he must find another helmet instead. Ferraù vows to win the helmet of Almonte, which now belongs to the greatest Christian knight, Orlando. He manages to possess it for a while but Ariosto predicts his ultimate death at the hands of Orlando. Like the character in the Pseudo-Turpin Chronicle and the 14th-century Italian epic La Spagna, Ferraù is completely invulnerable except via his navel.

== Ferragus in Valentine and Orson ==
Ferragus is also the name of a completely different Saracen giant from Portugal in the medieval romance Valentine and Orson. Brother of Esclarmonde, he is responsible for imprisoning Bellissant, the sister of King Pepin, and is eventually beheaded by the Duke of Aquitaine .

== See also ==
- Fierabras (or Ferumbras): a Saracen knight (son of Balan, king of Spain), (sometimes also of gigantic stature), appearing in several chansons de geste and texts relating to the Matter of France. Unlike Ferragut, Fierabras converts to Christianity, joins Charlemagne's cause, and eventually becomes a ruler of Spain.
- Faraj ben Sālim, also known as Farragut of Girgenti, a Sicilian-Jewish physician and translator.
