= Entrée d'Espagne =

14th-century Franco-Venetian epic poem

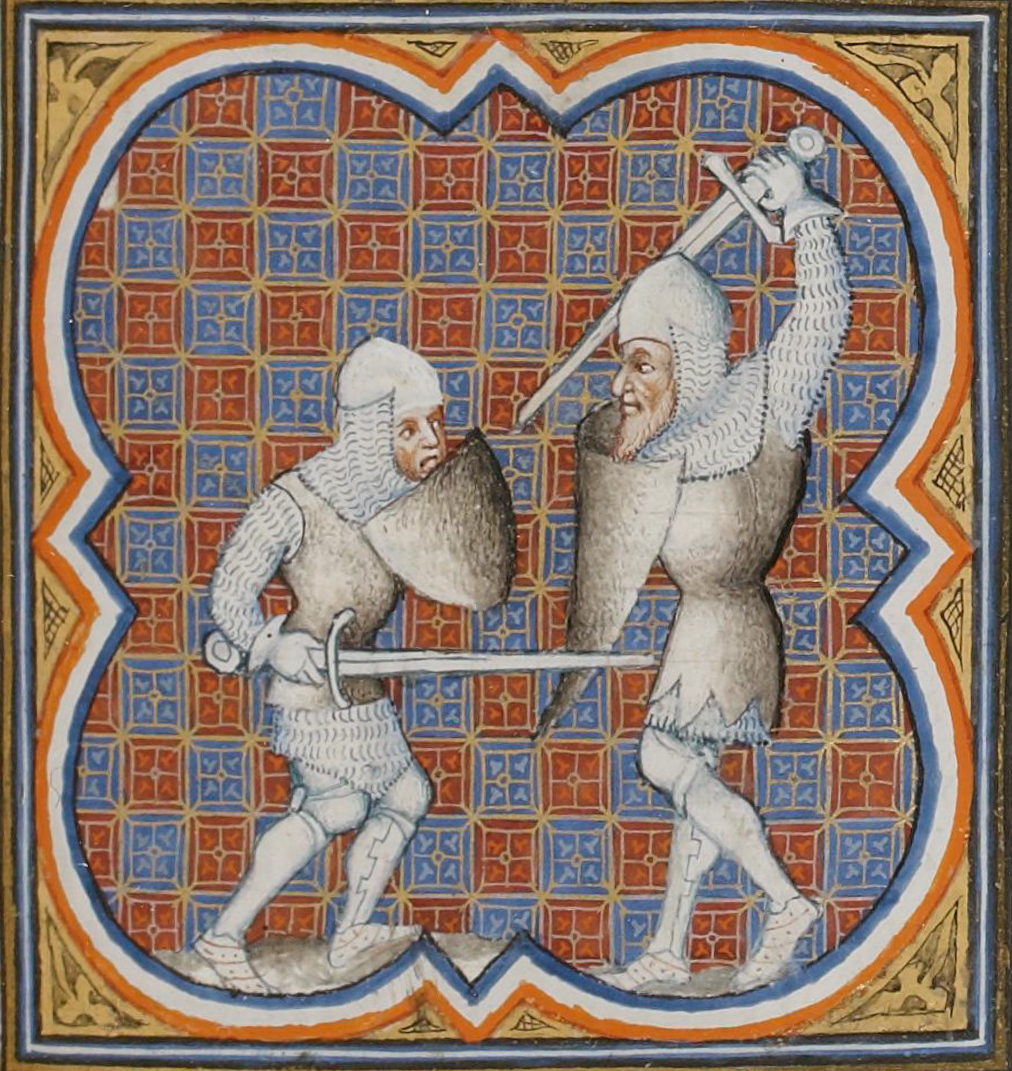
Combat of Roland and the giant Ferragut. Illuminated miniature from Grandes Chroniques de France, c. 1375–1380 (BnF Français 2813, fol. 118)

Entrée d'Espagne or L'Entrée d'Espagne or Entrée en Espagne (English: "Entry to Spain" or "Entering Spain") is a 14th-century (c. 1320) Franco-Venetian chanson de geste. The author is thought to be from Padua. The work has survived in only one manuscript, today in the Biblioteca Marciana in Venice. Based on material from the Pseudo-Turpin Chronicle (Historia Caroli Magni, Book IV of the Codex Calixtinus, a Latin chronicle concerning the feats of Charlemagne from the middle of the 12th century) and several other sources, the epic poem (around 16,000 verses extant, out of an original 20,000) tells of Charlemagne's battles in Spain and the adventures of the paladin Roland.

The poem is notable for transforming the character of Roland into a knight errant, similar to heroes from the Arthurian romances, and was thus a precursor to the portrayal of Orlando/Roland in the Italian romantic epics, such as Morgante (Luigi Pulci), Orlando Innamorato (Matteo Maria Boiardo) and Orlando Furioso (Ludovico Ariosto).

== Plot ==
Following a misunderstanding with the emperor Charlemagne, Roland decides to leave the imperial army and travels to the Holy Land where he has a series of adventures. On his return to Spain, he meets a hermit who forewarns Roland that he will be killed seven years after the French successfully conquer the city of Pamplona. When he returns to the French camp, the emperor offers Roland the crown of Spain, but Roland refuses it, saying he wishes to spend the remaining years of his life conquering lands for his emperor.

Among Roland's various adventures, the poem also relates Roland's three-day-long duel with Feragu, a Saracen giant (son of Falseron), responsible for the defense of the city of Nàjera (verses 1630 to 4213, roughly).

== See also ==
- La Spagna: a 14th-century Italian epic that is also an adaptation of the story of Charlemagne's battles in Spain and the adventures of Orlando (Roland).

== Bibliography ==
- L’Entrée d’Espagne. Chanson de geste franco-italienne publiée d’après le manuscrit unique de Venise par Antoine Thomas, Paris, Firmin-Didot («Société des anciens textes français»), 1913, 2 vols.
- Aebischer, Paul, Ce qui reste d’un manuscrit perdu de l’«Entrée d’Espagne», «Archivum Romanicum», 12 (1928), 233-264.
- Constans, Léopold, L’Entrée d’Espagne et les légendes troyennes, «Romania», 43, 1914, 430-432.
- Monteverdi, Angelo, Un fragment manuscrit de l’Entrée d’Espagne, Actes du premier Congrès international de la Société Rencesvals (Poitiers, juillet 1959), «Cahiers de civilisation médiévale» 3, 1960, 75.
- Specht, René, Cavalleria francese alla corte di Persia: l’episodio dell’«Entrée d’Espagne» ritrovato nel frammento reggiano, «Atti dell’Istituto Veneto di Scienze, Lettere ed Arti», 135 (1976–77), 489-506.
- Specht, René, Il frammento reggiano dell’«Entrée d’Espagne»: raffronto filologico col codice marciano francese XXI (= 257), «Atti dell’Istituto Veneto di Scienze, Lettere ed Arti», 136 (1977–78), pp. 407–24.
- Modena, Serena, Entrée d’Espagne http://www.rialfri.eu/rialfriWP/opere/entree-despagne; RIALFrI (Repertorio Informatizzato dell'Antica Letteratura Franco-Italiana) http://www.rialfri.eu/rialfriWP/
