= La Spagna =

- by Sostegno di Zanobi
- Original title: La Spagna in rima
- Country: Florence
- Language: Italian
- Genre: Epic
- Publication date: 14th century

La Spagna (Italian pronunciation: [la ˈspaɲɲa], English: "Spain"), also called La Spagna in rima, is a 14th-century Italian epic attributed to the Florentine Sostegno di Zanobi and likely composed between 1350 and 1360. The poem is in ottava rima, composed of 40 cantos (or cantari), each of about 40 octaves. The work is an adaptation of the story of Charlemagne's battles in Spain and the adventures of his nephew, the paladin Orlando (Roland), including the tale of his mortal duel with Ferraguto and his ultimate death at Roncesvalles.

The material derives originally from the much translated and adapted Pseudo-Turpin Chronicle (Historia Caroli Magni, Book IV of the Codex Calixtinus, a Latin chronicle concerning the feats of Charlemagne from the middle of the 12th century). The story of the death of Roland is also treated in The Song of Roland. An adaptation of the Pseudo-Turpin material also occurs in the anonymous Franco-Venetian epic L'Entrée d'Espagne (c. 1320; the author is thought to be from Padua).

La Spagna, which has been described by critics as "a darkly dramatic and often electrifyingly effective treatment of Ganelon's final treachery and Orlando's noble death", was an important source for the Italian romantic epics Morgante by Luigi Pulci (the last five cantos of Pulci's work are based on La Spagna), Orlando Innamorato by Matteo Maria Boiardo and Orlando Furioso by Ludovico Ariosto.

== Plot ==
The poem is an imaginative retelling of the events of Charlemagne's war against the Moors of Spain commanded by King Marsilio, including the historical events of the siege of Pamplona, the siege of Saragossa and the rout of Roncesvalles. The author begins with Charlemagne's intention to subdue Spain and then give the crown to his nephew, the count Orlando.

Charlemagne goes to Spain with his army and attacks several major cities, including Pamplona, ruled by King Isolieri. Orlando challenges the Saracen knight Ferragu/Ferraù to a duel and kills him on a bridge (Ferragu converts to Christianity at the point of death; the duel lasts three days and extends for 79 stanzas). Believed dead, Orlando has a series of travels and adventures that lead him to North Africa and elsewhere. In the end, the author tells the famous episode of the treachery of Gano of Maganza, envious of the glory of the family of Orlando. In the great battle of Roncesvalles, the main characters die, but are vindicated by Charlemagne, who is finally able to conquer Spain and to condemn the fraudulent Gano.
