= Daurel e Betó =

Old Occitan chanson de geste

Daurel e Betó (Occitan pronunciation: [dawˈɾɛl e βeˈtu]); Daurèl e Beton in modern Occitan, Daurel et Beton in French, "Daurel and Beton"), is an anonymous chanson de geste in Old Occitan which full title reads Lo romans de Daurel e de Betó. It is made up of 2198 lines, grouped in 53 monorhymed laisses of alexandrines (1–138) and decasyllables (139–2198), but the last fifteen being only partially readable , the end of the story remains a mystery. The one extant record of the text is a poorly kept manuscript discovered in 1876 by Ambroise-Firmin Didot. Though it could never be authentified before, the existence of such a work had been known since the early Middle Ages through a quick mention in a poem by the troubadour Guiraut de Cabrera. Daurel e Betó was written in the late twelfth or the early first half of the thirteenth century and is connected with the cycle of Charlemagne, but by the romantic character of the events is more like a regular romance of adventure. Excluding the cities of Paris and Babylon, all the places evoked in the tale are located in a region comprised between Poitiers and Agen, where it was probably composed. A thorough study of the vocabulary and alleged pronunciation (there was no fixed rules for spelling) of the author further reduces this area to Haute-Garonne and Tarn. Moreover, Beton, Aicelina, Gauserand and Bertrand were names mostly found in Occitania.

== Opening lines ==
So es lo romans de Daurel e de Betó:

Senhor, platz vos auzir huna rica cansó?
Entendét la, si vos plas, escotàs la razó,
D'un rich[e] duc de Fransa e del comte Guió
De [D]aurel lo joglar e de l'enfan Betó,
Que en sa junbentut tray tan gran pasió.
Lo duc Bobís d'Antona sazia en .j. peyró,
Entorn lu son Fransés, tuh li melhor baró
Aquí fo lo coms Gui cui doné Dieu mal do!
Cel que non n'a vila ne valor
Mas [que] sol hun cas[te]l c'um apela Aspremont.

This is the romance of Daurel and Beton:

Sir, would you please hear a fair song?
Listen, if you will, heed the story
Of a rich duke from France and the young Count Guy [of Southampton],
Of Daurel the minstrel and Beton the child,
Who in his youth went through great suffering.
The duke Bevis of Hampton sat on a stone bench;
Around him stand Frenchmen, all most noble barons.
There was Count Guy who dishonoured God!
He who has neither city nor valor
But a castle that goes by the name of Apremont.
