= Tristan de Nanteuil =

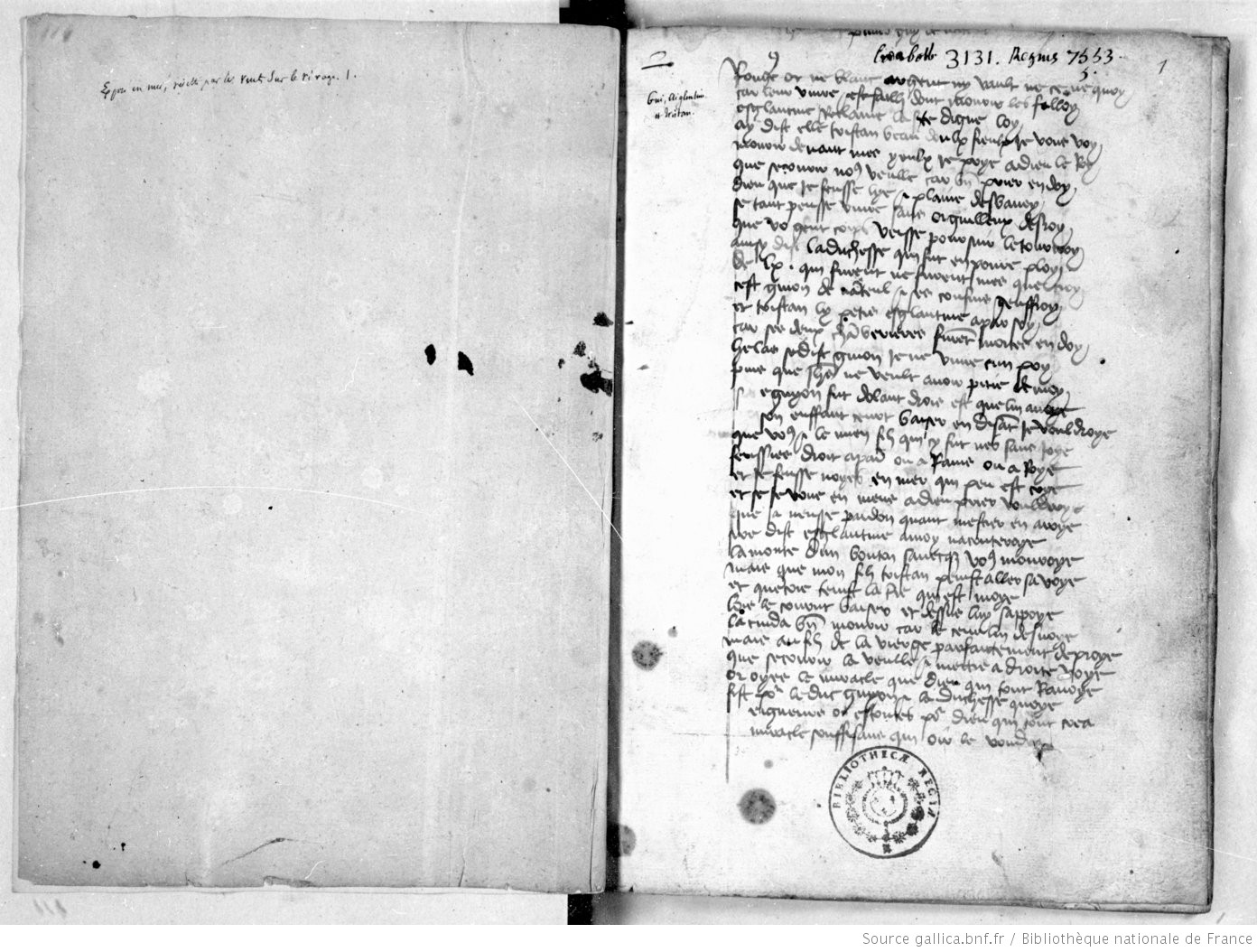
Incipit of Tristan de Nanteuil.

Tristan de Nanteuil is an anonymous chanson de geste in twelve-syllable verse, written at the beginning of the 14th century. It is a part of the Doon de Nanteuil cycle.

== Bibliography ==
- Editions
  - Tristan de Nanteuil, ed. Keith Val Sinclair, Assen, Van Gorcum, 1971, 839 p.
- Articles
  - Alexander Haggerty Krappe (1935). "Tristan de Nanteuil". Romania. 61 (241): 55–41.
  - Laurent Brun (2015). "Tristan de Nanteuil". ARLIMA Archives de littérature du Moyen Âge.
  - Spencer-Hall, Alicia; Gutt, Blake (2021). Trans and genderqueer subjects in medieval hagiography. ISBN 978-90-485-4026-6. OCLC 1247660706.
