= Master of Girart de Roussillon =

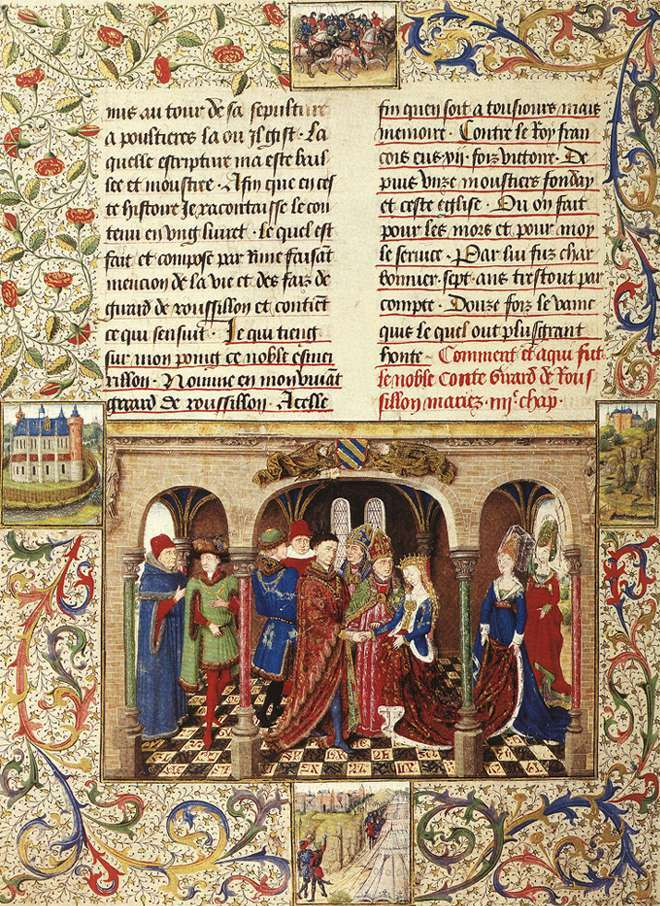
Illustration from the "Roman de Girart de Roussillon", 1450s. Austrian National Library, Vienna

The Master of Girart de Roussillon is an anonymous Burgundian illuminator whose fine illustrated manuscripts date between 1440 and 1465. During this period he worked for Philip the Good, Duke of Burgundy; Philip I of Croÿ, Governor of Luxembourg, and others. He decorated numerous surviving works, including the Roman de Girart de Roussillon from which his name is taken.

== Illustrated manuscripts ==
- Roman de Girart de Roussillon, ca. 1450, for Philip the Good, Vienna, Österreichische Nationalbibliothek
- Miroir d'humilité, or Traité de Morale, by St. Augustine, 1462, for Philip I of Croÿ, Madrid, Biblioteca Nacional de España, ms. Vit. 25.2.
- Composition de la sainte écriture, or Cy nous dit, 1462, for Philip the Good, Brusselles, Bibliothèque royale de Belgique, ms. 9017.
- Gilles de Trazegnies, 1463, for Antoine de Bourgogne, Dülme, Duke of Croÿ, ms. 50.
- Les Livres du roy Modus et de la royne Ratio, or Le Songe de pestilence, Henri de Ferrières (?), after 1455, for Philip the Good, Bruxelles, Bibliothèque royale de Belgique, ms. 10218-19.

== Sources ==
- de Fatima Bosch, Lynette María. Art, Liturgy, and Legend in Renaissance Toledo: The Mendoza and the Inglesia Primada. Pennsylvania State University Press, 2000. ISBN 0-271-01968-9
