= Fierabras =

Fictional Saracen knight in works of the Matter of France

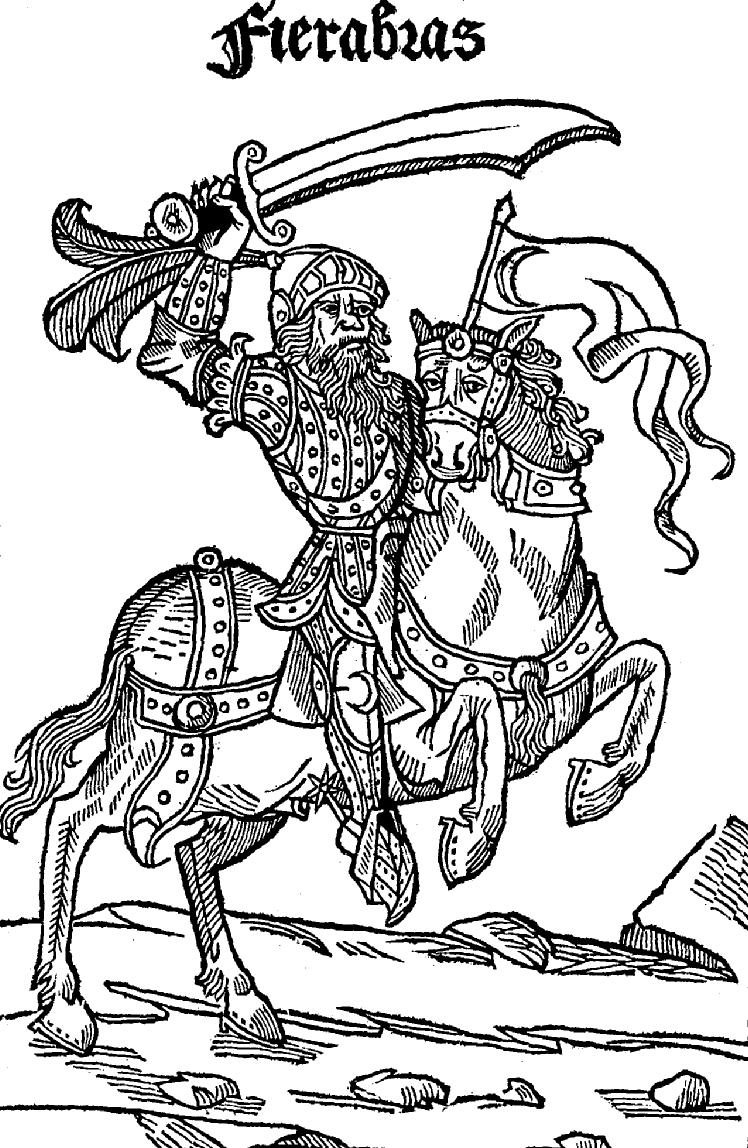
The giant Fierabras. Engraving from the 1497 edition of Jehan Bagnyon's Roman de Fierabras le Géant (P. Maréchal et B. Chaussard, Lyon), BNF RES-Y2-993

Fierabras (from French: fier à bras, "brave/formidable arm") or Ferumbras is a fictional Saracen knight (sometimes of gigantic stature) appearing in several chansons de geste and other material relating to the Matter of France. He is the son of Balan, king of Spain, and is frequently shown in conflict with Roland and the Twelve Peers, especially Oliver, whose prowess he almost rivals. Fierabras eventually converts to Christianity and fights for Charlemagne.

== Texts and adaptations ==
The oldest extant text of the story of Fierabras is a 12th-century (c. 1170) Old French chanson de geste of roughly 6,200 alexandrines in assonanced laisses. The story is as follows: the Saracen king Balan and his 15-foot-tall (4.6 m) son Fierabras return to Spain after sacking the church of Saint Peter's in Rome and taking the relics of the passion. Charlemagne invades Spain to recover the relics and sends his knight Olivier de Vienne, Roland's companion, to battle Fierabras.

Once defeated, the giant decides to convert to Christianity and joins Charlemagne's army, but Olivier and several other knights are captured. Floripas, Fierabras' sister, falls in love with one of Charlemagne's knights, Gui de Bourgogne. After a series of adventures, Charlemagne kills king Balan, divides Spain between Fierabras and Gui de Bourgogne (who marries Floripas), and returns to Saint Denis with the holy relics.

The poem also survives in an Occitan version dating from the 13th century (roughly 5,000 alexandrines; the first 600 verses do not appear in the Old French version). The Occitan and the Old French version may derive from a common lost source. This version in turn inspired an Italian version (Cantare di Fierabraccia e Ulivieri) in the second half of the 14th century.

Two English versions were made: Sir Ferumbras (late 14th or early 15th century) and Firumbras (fragmentary). A 15th-century English work, Sowdon of Babylon, combined the story with another work (the Destruction de Rome).

The story was put into prose three times in the 14th and 15th centuries:

- one anonymous version (14th century); in this version, among the various changes brought to the story, Fierabras is no longer depicted as a giant.
- a Burgundian version (expanded with other material from the Matter of France and the history of Charlemagne: Chroniques et conquêtes de Charlemagne) by David Aubert (c. 1456–8)
- and, most importantly, a Swiss French version by Jean or Jehan Bagnyon, Le rommant de Fierabras le geant (Geneva, 1478, the first chanson de geste to be printed) which the author (like David Aubert) expanded with other material from the Matter of France and the history of Charlemagne (from 1497 the title was La Conqueste du grand roy Charlemagne des Espagnes et les vaillances des douze pairs de France, et aussi celles de Fierabras). The historical material in Bagnyon's text is largely based on the Historia Caroli Magni (also known as the "Pseudo-Turpin" chronicle), probably known to Bagnyon via the Speculum Historiale of Vincent de Beauvais. The Bagnyon version became one of the most popular novels in France in the first half of the 16th century (15 editions printed to 1536) and was adapted into Castilian, Portuguese, German, and English (by William Caxton).

In Spain the story can be found in the Historia del emperador Carlomagno y de los doce pares de Francia by Nicolás of Piemonte first edited in 1521. This is a Castilian translation—or better, an adaptation—of Bagnyon's La Conqueste du grand roy Charlemagne. Miguel de Cervantes refers to Fierabras in his Don Quixote (see below).

There also exist other versions of the legend, including one in Early Modern Irish (Stair Fortibrais).

The 17th-century playwright Calderón de la Barca used elements of the story (the love affair of Floripas and Gui) for his play La Puente de Mantible.

In 1823, Franz Schubert wrote the opera Fierrabras, based on certain tales surrounding the knight's conversion.

== Historical sources ==
The story echoes the historical Arab raid against Rome in 846 in which Guy I of Spoleto (proposed as a source for "Gui de Bourgogne") participated, and critics have suggested that the existing "chanson" was based on a now lost poem describing the Sack of the Roman Basilicas extra muros.

The composition of the 12th-century poem may be closely linked to the cult of relics at the Basilica of St Denis in Paris and the creation of the local festival of Lendit, as the narrator in the Old French poem addresses himself to visitors at this fair.

Another view is that the Legend is based on the character of the Navarrese prince, Fortun "the Basque" Al-Graseiz or El-Akraz, as seen by the Arab chroniclers and perhaps known as such by Shakespeare to bring it over to his exotic character Fortinbras.

This is the tale that Robert the Bruce, King of Scots, is said by Barbour to have related to his men after they fled their enemies across Loch Lomond in 1307.

== Analyses of items ==
=== 9 swords ===
The three swords wielded by Fierabras are Baptesme (modern French: Baptême, "Baptism"), Plorance (or Florenche), and Garbain (or Gerben) (Note: In Kroeber&Servois edd., Old French: Bapteseme, Plorance, Grabain.) and made by the swordsmith Aurisas (Note: Ms. A (or Kroeber's a-text) gives "Hanisars".) Fierabras then reveals that not only his opponent Olivier's sword Hauteclaire, but the major swords of the French were manufactured by the brothers of that smith, totaling nine. (Note: Three brothers forged nine swords (v. 647) as explicitly stated in the poem.) As for the Frenchmen's weapons, Munificans struck Durendal, Musaguine and Cortain of Ogier, while master smith Galans (Wayland Smith) forged Renaud de Montauban's Floberge (Flamberge), Oliver's Hauteclere and Charlemagne's Joiouse (Joyeuse). (Note: Old French: Durendal, Musaguine, Courtain; Floberge, Hauteclere, Joiouse.)

The chanson de geste of Mainet（the youthful exploits of Charlemagne) spells the name of the smith Haurifas who is the brother of Galans.

=== The balm of Fierabras ===
According to a chanson from 1170, Fierabras and Balan conquered Rome and in Jerusalem (i.e., supposedly from the Holy Sepulchre), stole two barrels containing the balm (modern French: baume; Old French: basme) used for the corpse of Jesus. (Note: In the French poem, it is mentioned earlier that Fierabras had opened Christ's sepulchre in Jerusalem (vv. 373–381行)) This miraculous balm would heal whoever drank it.

In Chapter X of the first volume of Miguel de Cervantes' Don Quixote de la Mancha, after one of his numerous beatings, Don Quixote mentions to Sancho Panza that he knows the recipe of the balm of Fierabras. In Chapter XVII, Don Quixote instructs Sancho that the ingredients are oil, wine, salt and rosemary. The knight boils them and blesses them with eighty Pater Nosters, and as many Ave Marias, Salves and Credos. Upon drinking it, Don Quixote vomits and sweats but feels healed after sleeping. For Sancho it has also a laxative effect, rendering him near death. The ingredients, gestures and signs used by the knight fashion what is called an ensalmo, "a potion and prayer used to cure the sick in a way that was forbidden by the church." Indeed, it was used most frequently by moriscos.

== In modern fiction ==
In Ernest L'Épine's La Légende du Croque-Mitaine (1863), Oliver obtains a sword called Glorieuse (Glorious) with which he cleaves all nine swords mentioned in Fierabras. The work refers styles the Saracen's name Fierabras as Fier-à-Bras, which is translated as "Strong-i'-th'-arm".

== See also ==
- Ferragut (also known as Ferragus, Ferraguto, Ferraù, Fernagu, Ferracutus): a character, sometimes portrayed as a giant, in French and Italian romantic epics dealing with the Matter of France, including Orlando innamorato by Matteo Maria Boiardo and Orlando furioso by Ludovico Ariosto.
