= Aigar e Maurin =

Old Occitan epic poem

Aigar e Maurin is an anonymous Old Occitan epic poem of the twelfth century. The complete work does not survive, but 1,437 lines are known from two damaged fragments. The lines are decasyllabic and divided into 44 rhyming laisses. The fragments—two single folios—were bound in a legal manuscript of the sixteenth century.

The place of origin of Aigar e Maurin is uncertain. It is usually thought to come from Poitou. The date of composition is also uncertain. It is usually dated to the second half of the twelfth century, but there is evidence that it may have been composed before 1159. The troubadour Giraut de Cabreira shows knowledge of a version of the story in a poem that may date to before 1159, but perhaps as late as 1165. If the conflict between Aigar and Maurin is based on that between Henry II of England and Louis VII of France, then the date of composition can be narrowed further, for it must have been composed after Henry II's accession in 1154. Hans-Erich Keller, however, thought it was based on the revolt of the Young King in 1173.

Linguistically, Aigar is similar to Girart de Roussillon, but it is not clear in which direction the influence went. It contains signs of Anglo-Norman influence, and may even be a reworking of an originally Anglo-Norman poem. Olivier Naudeau went so far as to call its language a composite of Occitan and Norman French. Linda Paterson describes its tone as "primitive". In writing an essentially military tale, the poet displays some familiarity with military camps.

Its subject matter and point of view are unique among Occitan works, since it recounts the Capetian–Plantagenet rivalry from an Anglo-Norman perspective. Maurin, a Frenchman, is the vassal of the English king, Aigar, just as Henry II was a vassal of King Louis VII of France.
