= Siège d'Antioche =

First page from the Spalding manuscript

The Siège d'Antioche (or Estoire d'Antioche) is a Norman French rhyming poem about the First Crusade, produced either in England or Normandy in the late 12th century. It is about 19,000 lines in length and covers the period from the Council of Clermont in November 1095 to the battle of Ascalon in August 1099. It carries a spurious attribution to Archbishop Baldric of Dol and is known in full from two manuscripts and in part from two fragments. The older manuscript is Oxford, Bodleian Library, MS Hatton 77 from the 13th century. The younger is known as the Spalding manuscript and is London, British Library, MS Add. 34114 from the 14th century. There is no complete published edition of the text. Jennifer Gabel de Aguirre has published a partial edition. A complete edition is a work in progress of a variable team at Fordham University.

The Siège has usually been regarded as a freestanding, non-historiographical chanson de geste apart from the Crusade cycle.

== Bibliography ==
- Ailes, Marianne (2019). "The Chanson de geste". In Anthony Bale (ed.). The Cambridge Companion to the Literature of the Crusades. Cambridge University Press. pp. 25–38.
- Damian-Grint, Peter (1999). The New Historians of the Twelfth-Century Renaissance: Authorising History in the Vernacular Revolution. Boydell Press.
- Gabel de Aguirre, Jennifer, ed. (2015). La chanson de la Première Croisade en ancien français d'après Baudri de Bourgueil: Édition et analyse lexicale. Universitätsverlag C. Winter.
- Parsons, Simon Thomas (2018). "A Unique Song of the First Crusade?: New Observations on the Hatton 77 Manuscript of the Siège d'Antioche". In Simon Thomas Parsons; Linda M. Paterson (eds.). Literature of the Crusades. D. S. Brewer. pp. 55–74.
