= Edmund Stengel =

Edmund Max Stengel (April 5, 1845 in Halle – November 3, 1935 in Marburg) was a Romance philologist who specialized in studies of Chanson de geste. He published an exact transcript of the Bodleian Library manuscript of the Chanson de Roland in 1878, also photographing the entire manuscript. He later published a scholarly edition, the first volume of which was published in 1900. His library was donated to the Archives of the Catholic University of Louvain-la-Neuve upon his death; its contents are listed in the inventory there.

== Bibliography ==
- Codex manu scriptus Digby 86. Halis 1871.
- Mittheilungen aus französischen Handschriften der Turiner Universitäts-Bibliothek. Halle (Saale) 1873.
- Die beiden ältesten provenzalischen Grammatiken. Marburg 1878. Nachdruck 1971.
- Wörterbuch der ältesten französischen Sprache. Marburg 1882.
- Erinnerungsworte an Friedrich Diez. Marburg 1883.
- Beiträge zur Geschichte der romanischen Philologie in Deutschland: Festschrift für den ersten Neuphilologentag Deutschlands zu Hannover. Marburg 1886.
- Chronologisches Verzeichnis französischer Grammatiken vom Ende des 14. bis zum Ausgange des 18. Jahrhunderts. Jena 1890.
- Die altprovenzalische Liedersammlung c der Laurenziana in Florenz. In: Wissenschaftliche Beilage zum Vorlesungsverzeichnis der Universität Greifswald. Winter 1899–1900.
- Die ältesten französischen Sprachdenkmäler. Marburg 1901.

=== Edited texts ===
- Li Romans de Durmart le Galois. Stuttgart 1873.
- Das altfranzösische Rolandslied. Heilbronn 1878. Edition of the Song of Roland.
- La Cancün de saint Alexis. Marburg 1882.
- Das anglonormannische Lied von wackern Ritter Horn. Genauer Abdruck der Cambridger, Oxforder und Londoner Handschrift. With R. Brede. 1883. Edition of the 12th century Roman de Horn.
- Maître Élie's Überarbeitung der ältesten französischen Übertragung von Ovid's "Ars amatoria", herausgegebe. With H. Künhe. 1886. Edition of Elie of Winchester's 12th century translation of Liber Catonis (the Book of Cato).
- Hervis von Metz : Vorgedicht der lothringer Geste nach allen Handschriften. 1903.
- Jean Bodels Saxenlied. With F. Menzel. 1906-9.
