= Girart de Roussillon =

Frankish Burgundian leader

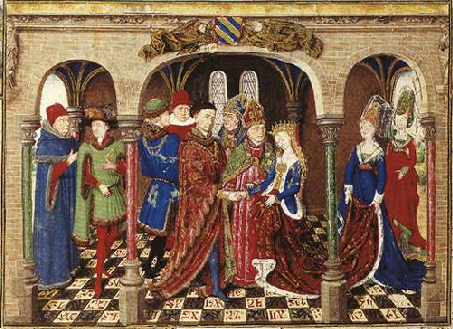
Marriage of Girart de Roussillon from an illuminated manuscript, c. 1450, in the collection of the Österreichische Nationalbibliothek, Vienna. Master of Girart de Roussillon

Girart de Roussillon, also called Girard, Gérard II, Gyrart de Vienne, and Girart de Fraite, (c. 810–877/879?) was a Frankish Burgundian leader who became Count of Paris in 837, and embraced the cause of Lothair I against Charles the Bald. He was a son of Leuthard I, Count of Fézensac and Paris, and his wife Grimildis.

Girart is not described as being from Roussillon in authentic historical sources. The placename in his title is derived from a castle he built on Mont Lassois, near Vix and Châtillon-sur-Seine (Côte-d'Or).

Girart de Roussillon is also an epic figure in the cycle of Carolingian romances, collectively known as the Matter of France. In the genealogy of the cycle's legendary heroes, Girart is a son of Doon de Mayence and appears in various irreconcilable events.

== Biography ==
Girart fought at the Battle of Fontenay in 841, and followed Lothair I to Aix-en-Provence. In 843, Girart married Bertha. They had two children: Thierry and Ava.

In 855, Girart became governor of Provence for Lothair's son Charles of Provence. Bertha defended Vienne unsuccessfully against Charles the Bald in 870. Girart, who had perhaps aspired to be the titular ruler of the northern part of Provence, continued to administer it under Lothair II until that prince's death in 869. He retired with his wife to Avignon where he died probably in 877, certainly before 879.

== Romance ==
The legend of Girart's piety, the heroism of his wife Bertha, and his wars with Charles passed into the genre of literary romance; however, the historical facts are so distorted that, in the epic Girart de Roussillon, he became an opponent of Charles Martel who was married to Bertha's sister. The legendary narrative Girart de Roussillon was long held to be a Provençal work, but its Burgundian origin has been proven.

Accounts of Girart are found in several early manuscripts. The earliest chanson de geste, called Le Chanson de Girart de Roussillon, dates from the second half of the 12th century. The original text, written in rhymed decasyllables, is preserved at the Bibliothèque nationale de France (BnF). It was translated for the first time by Paul Meyer in 1884 (Paris: Champion). A recent translation into modern French with notes by Micheline Combarieu du Grès and Gérard Gouiran was published in 1993 (Paris: Librairie générale française).

A romance written in rhymed alexandrines was written between 1330 and 1349 by monks in the abbey of Pothières, which was founded in about 860 by Girart. It was dedicated to Odo IV, Duke of Burgundy (ca. 1295–1350), and Jeanne de Bourgogne (called "Joan the Lame"), queen of France (1293–1349). The text is composed in a dialect midway between French and Old Occitan. Five manuscript copies of this version survive; two in Montpellier, France at the Bibliothèque Interuniversitaire (section médecine), one in Troyes (now held at the Bibliothèque de l'Arsenal in Paris), one in Paris at the BnF, and one in Brussels at the Bibliothèque royale de Belgique. This version was printed by Yale University in 1939 (New Haven: Yale University Press, Yale Romanic Studies, 16).

The version in alexandrines was the source for a romance in prose by Jehan Wauquelin in 1447 (Paris: éd. L. de Montille, 1880).

Southern French traditions concerning Girart, in which he is called the son of Garin de Monglane, are embodied in the 13th century narrative in rhymed decasyllable verses about the siege of Vienne by Charlemagne in Girart de Vienne by Bertrand de Bar-sur-l'Aube. The same traditions are also embraced in Aspramonte by Andrea da Barberino, based on the French chanson Aspremont, where he is called Girart de Frete or de Fraite and he leads an army of infidels against Charlemagne.

== See also ==
- Vézelay, abbey founded by Girart
- Franco-Provençal language

== Sources ==
- Bloch, R. Howard (1977). Medieval French Literature and Law. Berkeley, Los Angeles & London: University of California Press.
- Le Jan, Régine (2003). Famille et pouvoir dans le monde franc (VIIe-Xe siècle): essai d'anthropologie sociale (in French). Publications de la Sorbonne.
- Meyer, Paul (1878). La légende de Girart de Roussillon, Romania, no. 7, 1878. p. 161-235
- Meyer, Paul (1884). Girart de Roussillon. A translation in modern French with a comprehensive introduction.
- Michel, F. (1856) Gerard de Rossillon ... publié en francais et en provençal d'après les MSS. de Paris et de Londres. Paris.
- Tarb, P. (Ed.) (1850). Girart de Viane, in: L. Gautier, Epopées francaises, vol. iv. Reims.
- Wulif, F. A. (1874). Notice sur les sagas de Magus et de Geirard. Ed.: Lund.
