= Gormond et Isembart =

French epic poem

Gormond et Isembart (English: "Gormond and Isembart") is an Old French chanson de geste from the second half of the eleventh or first half of the twelfth century. Along with The Song of Roland and the Chanson de Guillaume, it is one of the three chansons de geste whose composition incontestably dates from before 1150; it may be slightly younger than The Song of Roland and, according to one expert, may date from as early as 1068. The poem tells the story of a rebellious young French lord, Isembart, who allies himself with a Saracen king, Gormond, renounces his Christianity, and battles the French king. The poem is sometimes grouped with the Geste de Doon de Mayence or "rebellious vassal cycle" of chansons de geste.

== The text ==
The extant work only survives in a fragment (two parchment sheets that had been used as a binding of a book) of 661 octosyllable (unusual for a chanson de geste) verses in assonanced laisses (conserved in the Royal Library of Belgium in Brussels) written in a central France dialect, dating from c. 1130, and that form the end of a much longer poem. The content of the entire poem can be inferred from two sources:

- a rhymed chronicle from the 13th century by Philippe Mousket;
- a 15th-century German adaptation/translation, Loher und Maller (1437), of a prose version of a late 14th/early 15th century French romance, Lohier et Mallart.

Dating of the composition of the chanson is based on:

- a mention in the chronicles (finished 1088, revised 1104) of Hariulf, a monk of Saint-Riqiuer;
- allusions to the chanson in Historia Regum Britanniae by Geoffrey of Monmouth.

== Plot ==
The reconstructed plot is as follows: The young French lord Isembart is cruelly persecuted by the French court and his uncle, king Louis, and he goes into exile in England, joining the Saracen king Gormond and renouncing Christianity. Isembart incites Gormond to attack France, to destroy Isembart's own lands and surrounding country, and to burn down the Abbey of Saint-Riquier. The French king comes to battle them at Cayeux (Cayeux-en-Santerre or Cayeux-sur-Mer). (The surviving fragment begins here.) In the battle, after a series of victorious combats, Gormond falls to Louis, but the king is himself mortally injured when he tries to remain on his horse. The Saracen troops are briefly in chaos, but Isembart takes over the army. He eventually unhorses his own father. Four days later, the Saracens give up the battle and Isembart dies, returning to Christianity in his last breaths.

== Historical sources ==
The poem appears based on an invasion of Norsemen who burned the Abbey of Saint-Riquier in February 881 and were defeated by Louis III six months later at Saucourt-en-Vimeu.
