= Raoul de Cambrai =

French epic poem

Raoul de Cambrai is a 12th -13th century French epic poem (chanson de geste) concerning the eponymous hero's battles to take possession of his fief and of the repercussions from these battles. It is typically grouped in the "rebellious vassals cycle", or "Geste of Doon de Mayence".

== Plot ==
Raoul de Cambrai, the posthumous son of Raoul Taillefer, count of Cambrai, by his wife Alais, sister of King Louis d'Outre-Mer, whose father's lands had been given to another, demanded the fief of Vermandois, which was the natural inheritance of the four sons of Herbert, lord of Vermandois. On King Louis's refusal, he proceeded to war. The chief hero on the Vermandois side was Bernier, a grandson of Count Herbert, who had been the squire and firm adherent of Raoul, until he was driven into opposition by the fate of his mother, burned with the nuns in the church of Origny. Bernier eventually slew the terrible Raoul in single fight, but in his turn was slain, after an apparent reconciliation, and the blood-feud was left for his sons.

== Text ==
Raoul de Cambrai has come down to us in 3 manuscripts of varying quality. The most complete version dates from the 13th century, but certain sections are missing. The extant poem comprises roughly 8,542 decasyllable verses (depending on the edition and corrections made for missing material; here, the Kibler edition is referenced), of which the first 5,373 are grouped into rhymed laisses, while the remaining verses are grouped into assonanced laisses. While the section with assonance would typically be considered the older of the two sections, it appears from the romantic elements of this section that the assonance section is in fact of a later date, perhaps written by a poet desiring an archaic tone.

The existing 13th century (composed c. 1200) epic appears to have been composed in three different stages: an early 12th century assonanced section concerning the hero Raoul; a late 12th century reworking into rhymes of the original section, plus the addition of a section concerning Roaul's nephew Gautier; finally, an early 13th century addition (inspired by romances) in assonance of the story of Bernier. There is however mention (laisses 120-121) that the poem is based on a version by a noble trouvère of Laon called Bertholais, who professed to have witnessed the events he described.

Raoul de Cambrai presents, like the other provincial geste of Garin le Loherain, a picture of the devastation caused by the private wars of the feudal chiefs. A parallel narrative, obviously inspired by popular poetry, is preserved in the chronicle of Waulsort (ed. Achery, Spicilegium, ii. p. 100 seq.), and probably corresponds with the earlier recension.

== Historical sources ==
The date of these events is exactly ascertainable. Flodoard (Annales, Anno 943) states that Count Herbert died in that year, and was buried by his sons at Saint-Quentin, that when they learnt that Raoul, son of Raoul de Gouy, was about to invade their father's territory, they attacked him and put him to death. The identity of the other personages of the story has also been fixed from historical sources. The third part of the poem, of which Bernier is the hero, is of later date, and bears the character of a roman d'aventures.
