= Galiens li Restorés =

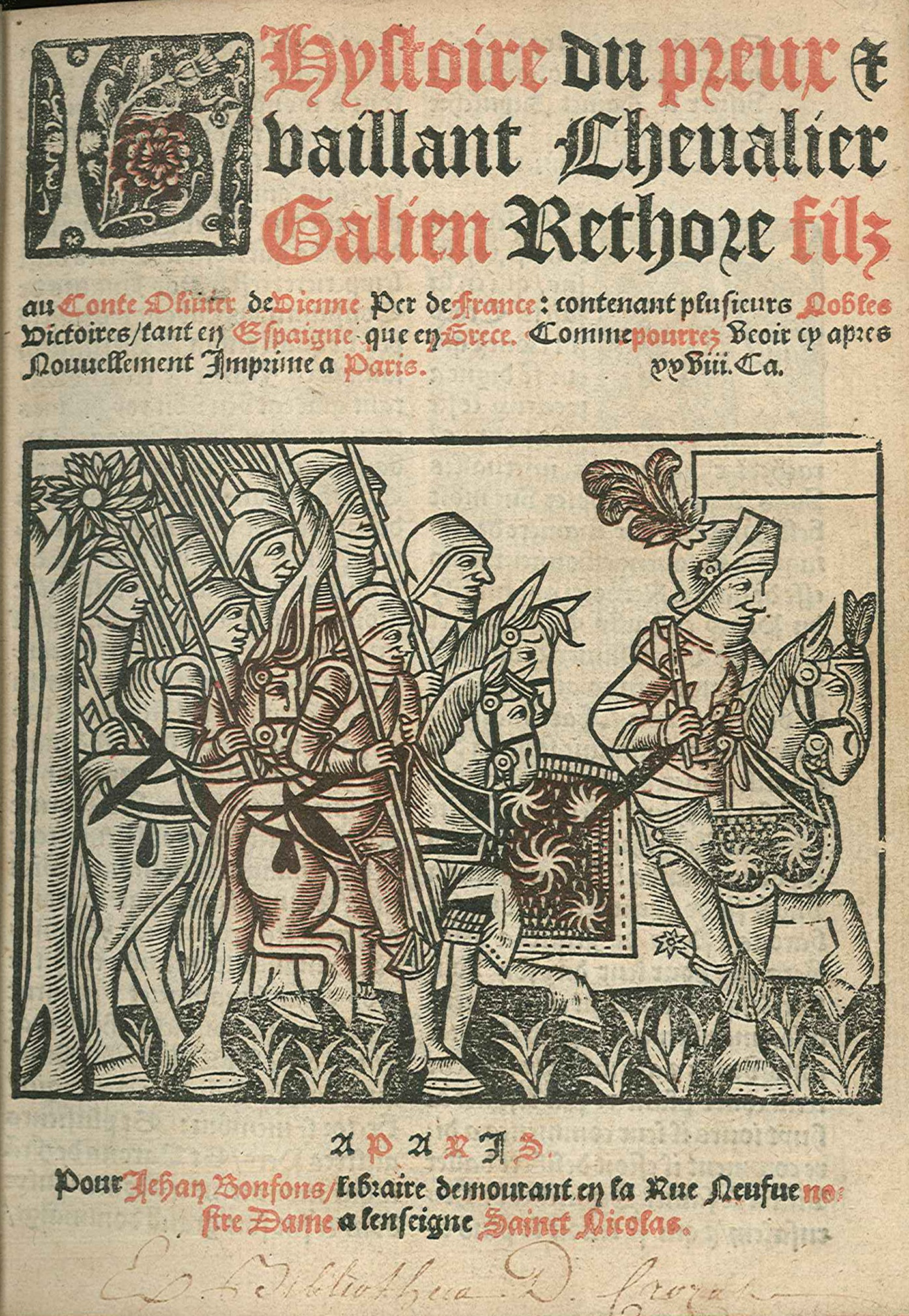
Title page of an edition of Galien rhétoré (Paris, Jean Bonfons, ca 1550)

Galiens li Restorés, or Galien le Restoré or Galien rhétoré (in English, "Galien the Restored"), is an Old French chanson de geste which borrows heavily from chivalric romance. Its composition dates anywhere from the end of the twelfth century to the middle of the fourteenth century. Five versions of the tale are extant, dating from the fifteenth century to the sixteenth century, one in verse and the others in prose. The story—which is closely linked to the earlier chansons de geste Pèlerinage de Charlemagne and The Song of Roland (especially in the latter's rhymed version)—tells of the adventures of Galien, son of the hero Olivier and of Jacqueline, the daughter of the (fictional) emperor Hugon (Hue the Strong) of Constantinople.

Galien, with its voyages and romance elements, enjoyed a strong success in the late Middle Ages and early Renaissance and largely eclipsed The Song of Roland in public taste.

== Plot ==
Galien seeks out his father Olivier at the Battle of Roncevaux Pass, and helps Roland and Charlemagne rout the Saracens. Later, he saves his mother from treacherous uncles and becomes emperor of Constantinople.

== Editions ==
Three of the extant versions of the tale (including the one in verse) are part of larger compilations entitled Garin de Monglane in which are grouped other works concerning the feats of the descendants of Garin (Girart de Vienne, Olivier, Galien, etc.). The verse version (the "Cheltenham manuscript") is in alexandrines grouped in rhymed laisses; one of the two other compiled versions is in manuscript form, the other is in a printed edition (c.1502-11).

The remaining two versions of the tale have only the Galien tale; one of these is the printed edition of 1500, later reprinted with a different ending in 1525.

Surviving editions:

- containing the cycle:
  - the "Cheltenham manuscript" (in verse). La Geste de Montglane. Library of the University of Oregon (Eugene, Oregon). Originally published by Edmund Stengel in 1890 (Marburg).
  - Guérin de Montglave (sic), printed c.1502-1511.
  - Ms. 3351 of the Bibliothèque de l'Arsenal.
- containing only Galiens:
  - Galien rhétoré, printed in 1500.
  - Ms. 1470 fr. of the Bibliothèque Nationale de France.
