= Le Pèlerinage de Charlemagne =

Old French chanson de geste

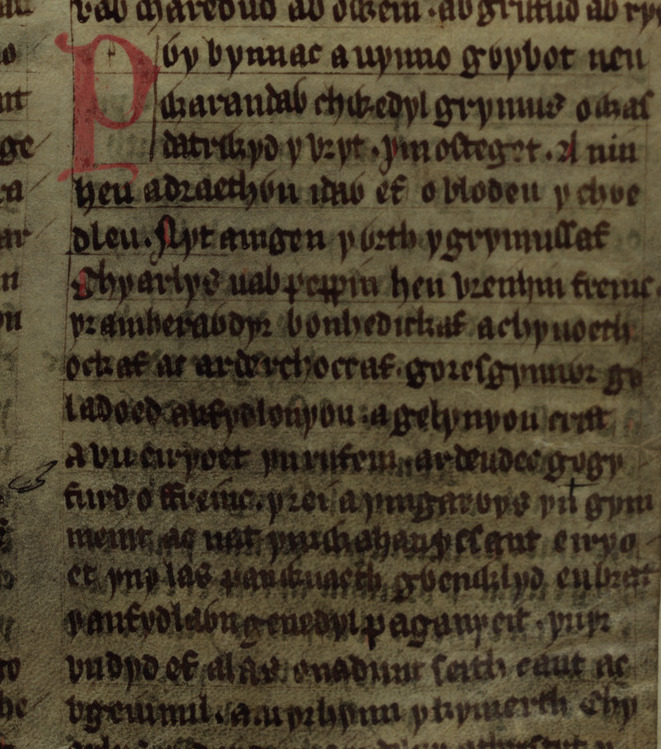
The opening of Ystoria Carolo Magno: Rhamant Otfel (Jesus College, Oxford MS 111.), a translation into Middle Welsh of Le Pèlerinage de Charlemagne

Le Pèlerinage de Charlemagne (The Pilgrimage of Charlemagne) is an Old French chanson de geste (epic poem) dealing with a fictional expedition by Charlemagne and his paladins. The oldest known written version was probably composed around 1140. Two 15th-century reworkings of the story are also known.

The romance is preserved in a single manuscript, the British Library Royal, 16. E. VIII. However, the manuscript was lost in 1879, and all subsequent editions are based on Eduard Koschwitz's edition.

== Summary ==
Charlemagne asks his wife if any king wears a crown better than he does. To Charlemagne's outrage, she answers that the (fictional) Byzantine Emperor Hugo wears one better. Under the pretense of a pilgrimage, Charlemagne and his Twelve Peers set out for the east. They go to Jerusalem first, where they meet the patriarch, who gives them many important relics to take back, and also the title of Emperor. On the way home, they stop at Constantinople, a very beautiful and rich city free from theft and poverty. There they meet Hugo, indeed a very handsome and glorious king, standing on a golden plough. They are invited to the palace, an edifice which stands on a pole and revolves when the wind revolves.

Charlemagne and the Peers are welcomed in courtly fashion and they are assigned a beautiful room, in which King Hugo has hidden a spy. Charlemagne and his companions drink too much and start to joke, about their extraordinary abilities. Olivier says he can sleep with Hugo's daughter a hundred times during a single night, Turpin claims he can juggle apples while standing with each leg on a different running horse, and so forth. The next day, when confronted with these jokes, Charlemagne and his Peers retreat to their quarters ashamed. There, they pray to God in front of the relics, and promptly an angel appears, saying he will help Charlemagne.

Charlemagne returns to Hugo and claims that he is indeed capable of all the things he and his companions boasted about. Hugo doesn't believe it, but with the help of God, the Peers can perform their tasks. Hugo is very impressed and takes a vow to become Charlemagne's vassal. Once back home he forgives his wife.

Plot summaries are available online in French. One by Paulin Paris, and another by Gaston Paris, his son.

== Later use ==
Whether Le Pèlerinage de Charlemagne is a satire on the genre of the chanson de geste or not is debated. Also, the date and location of the composition of the poem are unknown. The text has also been translated into Old Norse prose, into the so-called Karlamagnus Saga. The prose translation into Middle Welsh, Pererindod Siarlymaen, is found complete together with the other tales of the Welsh cycle of Charlemagne, Cân Rolant, Cronicl Turpin and Rhamant Otfel, in two Welsh manuscripts of the middle of the 14th and late-14th century (White Book of Rhydderch, Peniarth 5, and Red Book of Hergest).

The later chanson de geste Galiens li Restorés derives, in part, from the Pèlerinage and tells of the adventures of Galien, the son of Olivier and the Emperor of Byzantium's daughter.

== Editions and translations ==
- Charlemagne, an Anglo-Norman poem of the twelfth century now first published with an introduction and a glossarial index by Francisque Michel. 1836.
- "Le pèlerinage de Charlemagne: pub. avec un glossaire" ed. Anna Julia Cooper, Eduard Koschwitz. Paris: A Lehure, 1925. [Text and glossary.]
- Le voyage de Charlemagne à Jérusalem et à Constantinople ed. Paul Aebischer. Geneva: Droz, 1965. [Text.]
- The pilgrimage of Charlemagne = Le pèlerinage de Charlemagne tr. Glyn S. Burgess, Anne Elizabeth Cobby. New York: Garland, 1988. [Translation.]
- Ystorya de Carolo Magno ed. Stephen Joseph Williams. Caerdydd 1930 (argraffiad newydd 1968).
- Sechs Bearbeitungen des Altfranzösischen Gedichts von Karls des Großen Reise nach Constantinopel ed. Eduard Koschwitz. Heilbronn 1879. [Texts and Translations.]
