= Historia Caroli Magni =

Start of the Historia in the Codex Calixtinus

The Historia Caroli Magni ('History of Charles the Great'), also known as the Historia Karoli Magni et Rotholandi ('History of Charles the Great and Roland') or the (Pseudo-)Turpin Chronicle, is a 12th-century Latin chronicle consisting of legendary material about Charlemagne's campaigns in Spain. The chronicle states it was written by Charlemagne's contemporary Turpin, Archbishop of Reims, but it was found out as a medieval forgery. The work was extremely popular, and served as a major source of material on Charlemagne in chronicles, fiction and iconography throughout Medieval Europe. The miracles of the flowering lances and the death of Ferracutus appear on the windows of Chartres Cathedral.

== Origins ==
The Historia Caroli Magni was presented as authentic by using the name of Pope Calixtus II, who was already dead, when the Pseudo-Turpin wrote his "Historia" (this he did not before 1130). It is, however, not based on historical sources but on the tradition of the chansons de geste, notably the Chanson de Roland (Song of Roland). Its popularity seems to date from the latter part of the 12th century, the period when versions of this epic began to be written down. Gaston Paris, who made a special study of the Historia, considers that the first five chapters were written by a monk of Compostela in the 11th century and the remainder by a monk of Vienne between 1109 and 1119, but this is widely disputed. No conclusive evidence has been given on its real origins.

== Plot ==
The Chronicle recounts the following incidents:

At the request of Saint James who appears to him in dream, Charlemagne embarks on four wars to wrest Spain from the Saracens. In the first war, he takes his army to Santiago de Compostela and conquers all of Spain. A second war is brought on to battle the African king Agolant who, briefly, reconquers the country. (During this war, several miracles occur, including flowers sprouting from the lances of the knights.) A third war has Agolant invading south-western France and besieging the city of Agen, but he is forced to retreat to Pamplona. In the fourth war, Charlemagne's great army besieges Pamplona. After the death of Agolant, Charlemagne's troops pursue the Saracens through Spain.

In a story modeled on David and Goliath, Roland battles the Saracen giant Ferracutus, who is holding the city of Nájera. They fight for two days, taking truces to rest at night, but during the second night the courteous Roland places a stone beneath the head of the giant as a pillow, and upon waking the giant reveals to Roland that he is only vulnerable in one spot: his navel. In the subsequent battle, Roland's sword finds the spot and the giant is killed.

Once the last Saracen leaders are defeated, Charlemagne invests Santiago de Compostela with considerable powers and begins the return to France. The chronicle then tells the Song of Roland material: at the battle of Roncevaux Pass, Charlemagne's rearguard, which includes Roland, is ambushed by the troops of brothers Marsile and Baligant, kings of Zaragoza, who have bought the aid of the traitor Ganelon. Roland kills Marsile, but is mortally wounded and blows his horn to recall Charlemagne's army. After routing the Saracens, Charlemagne oversees the trial and execution of Ganelon, and the heroes' bodies are brought back to France. Charlemagne invests Basilique Saint-Denis with considerable prerogatives and dies.

The chronicle ends with several appendices, including the purported discovery of Turpin's tomb by Pope Calixtus II and Callixtus' call to crusade.

== Publication history ==
=== Manuscripts and medieval translations ===
The Historia Caroli Magni was a huge success throughout Europe. There are 158 Latin and more than 50 vernacular manuscripts of the story in existence.

It is Book IV (Historia Turpini) in the Codex Calixtinus, the oldest known manuscript of the text.

The popularity of the work is attested by the fact that there are at least nine French translations of the Historia dating from the 13th century of about the same time, all from Northern France.

There is a Welsh adaptation, dating to the 14th century, and found in the Red Book of Hergest and a number of other early manuscripts, where it occurs along with the translations of The Song of Roland and the Romance of Otinel.

=== Printed editions and modern translations ===
The Historia was first printed in 1566 at Frankfurt; perhaps the best edition is the one edited by Ferdinand Castets as Turpini historia Karoli magni et Rotholandi (Paris, 1880). It has been translated many times into French and also into German, Danish and English. The English translation is by Thomas Rodd and is in the History of Charles the Great and Orlando, ascribed to John Turpin (London, 1812), available online in PDF format at Google Books, in various formats at the Internet Archive, and in chaptered HTML at Kellcraft Studios Web Textures. Rodd omits the table of contents, which is part of the original source, as well as the final four chapters. A new English translation with illustrations, introduction and notes by Kevin R. Poole was published in 2014.

== Reception ==
=== Influence ===
Some medieval chroniclers used material from the Historia Caroli Magni in total faith to discuss the Spanish wars. The work was used by the authors of the Grandes Chroniques de France (13th-15th centuries), a vast compilation of historical material.

An adaptation of the Pseudo-Turpin story including the scene with Ferracutus/Ferraguto and his mortal duel with Orlando (Roland) occurs in the anonymous Franco-Venetian epic L'Entrée d'Espagne (c.1320; the author is thought to be from Padua). The material also appears in the 14th-century Italian epic La Spagna (attributed to the Florentine Sostegno di Zanobi and likely composed between 1350 and 1360).

Jean Bagnyon's 15th-century La Conqueste du grand roy Charlemagne des Espagnes et les vaillances des douze pairs de France, et aussi celles de Fierabras (also called Fierabras) includes material from the Historia Caroli Magni, probably via Vincent of Beauvais's Speculum Historiale. This work knew a European success and was adapted into Castilian, Portuguese, German, and English.

Matteo Maria Boiardo in Orlando Innamorato frequently mentions Turpin, sometimes as a source, sometimes claiming to fill in history that Turpin omits. For example:
"Few people know this story since its teller -- Turpin -- kept it hid. He may have feared that his account seemed disrespectful to the Count."

=== Modern interpretations ===
The text is considered by critics, in part, as a work of propaganda promoting the Way of St. James (many of the sites mentioned in the text are on the pilgrimage route to Santiago de Compostela) and the Reconquista. The work also paints the knights of the chanson de geste tradition as pious crusading models.
