= Aiquin =

Aiquin (also spelled Aquin or Acquin), (Note: It is sometimes given the full title Roman d'Aquin ("Romance of Aiquin") or Chanson d'Aiquin ("Song of Aiquin").) subtitled La conqueste de la Bretaigne par le roy Charlemaigne (Note: La Conquête de la Bretagne par le roi Charlemagne in modern French.) ("The Conquest of Brittany by King Charlemagne"), is a medieval Old French chanson de geste (heroic narrative poem) about the rivalry between a Saracen king, Aiquin, and the Christian emperor Charlemagne. The French medievalist Joseph Bédier called it a "consolidation of history and legend in an imposing ensemble." It survives in one fifteenth-century manuscript, BnF fr. 2233, now in the Bibliothèque nationale de France. It is usually attributed to Garin Trousseboeuf, possibly a cleric of Dol. According to historian Éric Borgnis-Desbordes, it was written in the early thirteenth century, probably around 1213 and under the guise of a chanson de geste featuring Charlemagne and the Viking invasions in the tenth century, the author may have alluded to “the transition from Plantagenet domination to Capetian influence in Brittany”. It is the oldest extant French text from Brittany.

The setting of the chanson almost certainly corresponds to the period 919–37 in Breton history, when the Normans (Vikings newly settled in northern France) persistently raided Brittany. It conflates Saracens (Sarrasin) and Arabs (Arabis) with Normans (Norois), and places Aiquin's origins in the north country (Nort pais). It also turns Roland, the Frankish hero of the earlier Chanson de Roland, into a native Breton.

Inspired by Aiquin, the family of the famous French soldier Bertrand du Guesclin (died 1380) claimed to descend from the Saracen king.

== Editions ==
- Jacques, F., ed. (1977). Aiquin, ou la conquête de la Bretagne par le roi Charlemagne. Aix-en-Provence: Publications du Centre Universitaire d'Etudes et de Recherches Medievales d'Aix.
- Joüon des Langrais, Frédéric, ed. (1880). Le roman d'Aquin, ou La conqueste de la Bretaigne par le roy Charlemaigne: chanson de geste du XIIe siècle. Nantes: Société des Bibliophiles Bretons.
- Lenoir, Nicolas, ed. (2009). Étude sur la Chanson d'Aiquin, ou La Conquête de la Bretagne par le roi Charlemagne. Nouvelle Bibliothèque du Moyen Âge. Paris: Honoré Champion.
- Lozac'hmeur, Jean-Claude; Ovazza, Maud, eds. (1985). La Chanson d'Aiquin: texte traduit, présenté et annoté. Jean Picollec.

== Bibliography ==
- Ailes, Marianne (2012). "Review of Nicolas Lenoir, Etude sur la Chanson d'Aiquin, ou La Conquete de la Bretagne par le roi Charlemagne". Medium Aevum. 81 (2): 157–58.
- Bédier, Joseph (1926). "La conquête de la Bretagne par le roi Charlemagne". Les légendes épiques, recherches sur la formation des chansons de geste. Vol. 2. Paris. pp. 99–142.
- Borgnis-Desbordes, Éric (2018). Constance de Bretagne (1161-1201), une duchesse face à Richard Cœur de Lion et Jean sans Terre. Fouesnant: Yoran embanner.
- Hanak, M. J. (1971). "Torleus and Dapamorz: Two Examples of Ethnic Amalgamation in the Song of Roland". Romanische Forschungen. 83 (4): 405–22.
- Jones, Michael, ed. (2004). Letters, Orders and Musters of Bertrand Du Guesclin (1357–1380). Woodbridge: Boydell Press.
