= Carmen de Prodicione Guenonis =

Anonymous poem in medieval Latin

Carmen de Prodicione Guenonis ("Song of the Treachery of Ganelon") is an anonymous poem in medieval Latin, written in the first half of the 12th century. Composed in elegiac couplets by an unskilled versifier, it is a version of the legendary history of the Battle of Roncevaux Pass. This is the same story that is told in the Old French Chanson de Roland and in several other versions and languages. The Latin poem seems to be based on a hearing or reading of an Old French chanson de geste, in the same tradition as the written Chanson but differing from it in many details, perhaps around the year 1120.

== Bibliography ==
- Gaston Paris, "Le carmen de prodicione Guenonis et la légende de Roncevaux" in Romania vol. 11 (1882) p. 465 ff.
- F. J. E. Raby, A History of Secular Latin Poetry in the Middle Ages (Oxford: Clarendon Press, 1934. ISBN 0-19-814325-7) vol. 2 pp. 71-72.
