= Anseïs de Carthage =

Thirteenth-century chanson de geste

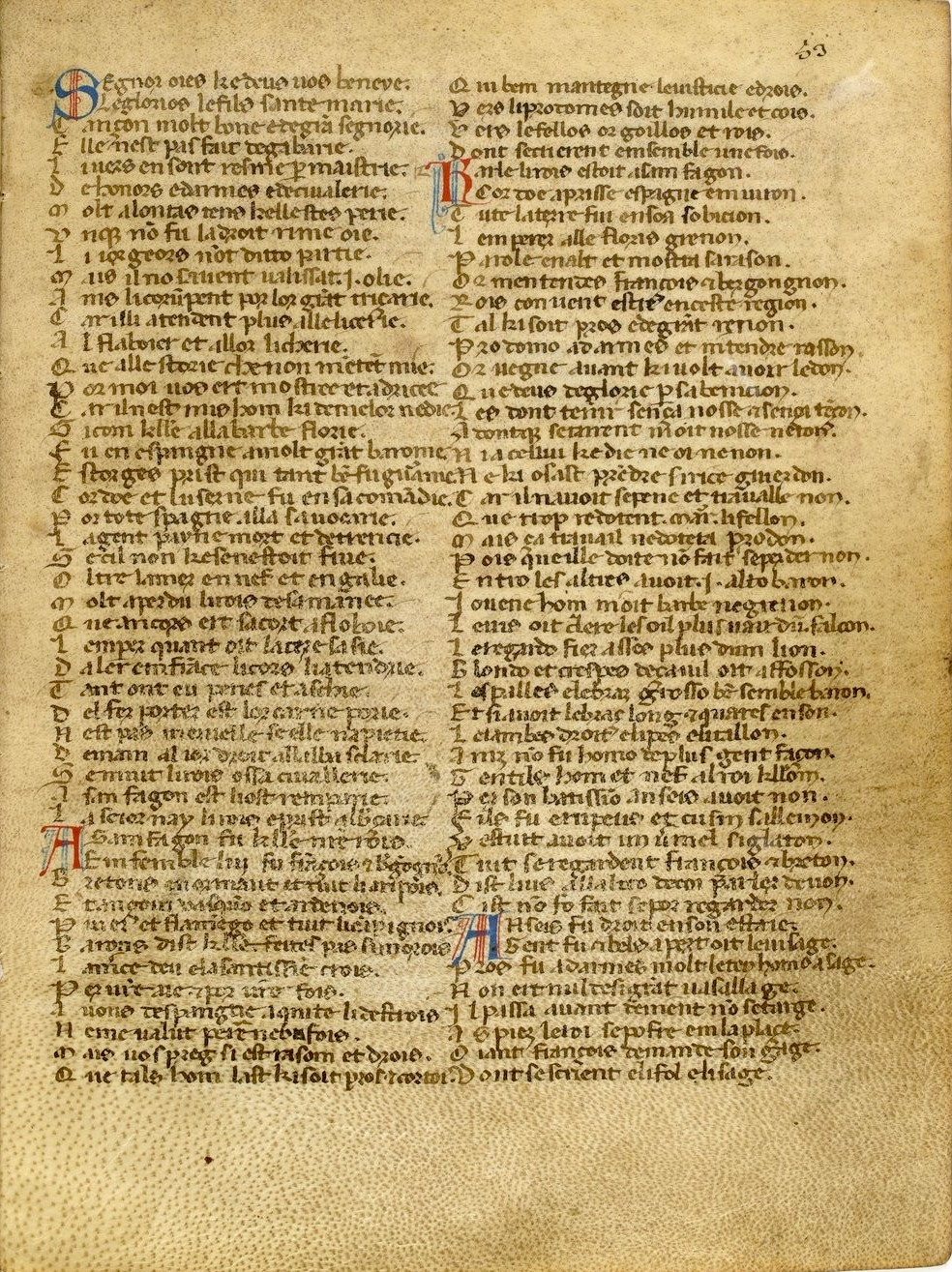
- first page of Anseïs de Carthage in manuscript fr. 1598, in the Bibliothèque Nationale de France
- Written: 1230–1250
- First published in: Germany, 1892
- Language: old French
- Genre: chanson de geste
- Lines: about 11000
- Metre: rhymed decasyllables

Anseïs de Carthage is a thirteenth-century chanson de geste. It is preserved in four manuscripts, though some are fragmentary. It is a sequel to the Chanson de Roland, and is set against the background of the Reconquista of Spain. It was written between 1230 and 1250, and consists of about 11000 rhymed decasyllables. A prose version of the tale is preserved in a manuscript of the late fifteenth century, with the title La cronique associée de Charlemaine très loable et Anseis icy coupplée. The first printed edition of the chanson is that of Johann Alton in 1892.

== Sources ==
A complete manuscript of the chanson is held by the Bibliothèque Nationale de France, under reference fr. 1598; another manuscript, dating from 1280–1300, is held under reference fr. 793.

In the twentieth century, two manuscript parchment bifolia of the chanson were found in Italy, where in the early years of the seventeenth century they had been used as bindings for other documents; these, with many other mediaeval manuscripts, are believed to have originated in the libraries of the d'Este family, which shortly before had moved its court from Ferrara to Modena. One bifolium was discovered by Monica Longobardi in Imola, and is held in the Biblioteca Comunale, the municipal library of that town. The other was included in a group of documents later transferred from the Archivio Notarile di Bologna, a legal archive, to the Archivio di Stato or state archives of Bologna; it was described in 1931 by Vincenzo De Bartholomaeis, who may have removed it from the archives at that time. It is now considered lost.
