= Basin (chanson de geste) =

Basin is a chanson de geste about Charlemagne's childhood. While the Old French epic poem has been lost, the story has come down to us via a 13th-century Norse prose version in the Karlamagnús saga.

== Plot ==
At the death of his father, an angel warns the young Charlemagne to take to the Ardennes and join up with the notorious thief Basin. During their adventures, Charlemagne learns of a plot to kill him and, in the end, the traitors are discovered, Charlemagne is crowned and Basin the thief is rewarded.

== Historical sources ==
The traitors in the story (Rainfroi and Helpri) are most likely based on Chilperic and Ragenfrid who were defeated by Charles Martel in 717 CE. It is unknown if the author was acquainted with an 11th-century version of these events called Passio Agilolfi.

== Influence ==
The names of the traitors in Basin were passed on to two other chansons de geste about Charlemagne's youth: Mainet and Berthe aus grans piés. In these chansons Rainfroi and Heudri are the illegitimate sons of King Pepin the Short and the false Queen Aliste and therefore the half-brothers of Prince Charlemagne.

A twelfth century Dutch epic with a similar plot survives as Karel ende Elegast.
