= Jean Bodel =

Old French poet

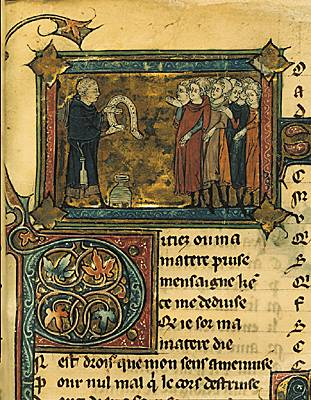
- Born: c. 1165
- Died: c. 1210; Arras
- Occupation: poet
- Writing career
- Period: Medieval
- Genres: chanson de geste, fabliaux

Jean Bodel (c. 1165 – c. 1210), also spelled Jehan Bodel, was an Old French poet who wrote a number of chansons de geste as well as many fabliaux. He lived in Arras.

== Writings ==
Bodel wrote Chanson des Saisnes ("Song of the Saxons") about the war of King Charlemagne with the Saxons and their leader Widukind, whom Bodel calls Guiteclin. He also wrote a miracle play called the Le Jeu de saint Nicolas ("The Play of Saint Nicolas"), which was probably first performed in Arras on 5 December 1200. Set in the middle of an epic battle between Christians and Muslims, the play tells the story of a good Christian who escapes the battle and is found praying to a statue of Saint Nicolas by the Muslim forces. The Muslim leader decides to test the saint by unlocking the doors to his treasury and leaving the statue as a guardian, stipulating that if anything were stolen the Christian would forfeit his life. Three thieves attempt to steal the treasure, but Saint Nicolas stops them. As a result, the Muslim ruler and his entire army convert to Christianity.

Like another French miracle play from the same time period, Le Miracle de Théophile, Le Jeu de saint Nicolas contains an invocation to the Devil in an unknown language:

Palas aron ozinomas
Baske bano tudan donas
Geheamel cla orlay
Berec hé pantaras tay

Bodel was the first person of record to classify the legendary themes and literary cycles known to medieval literature into the "Three Matters".

His epic La Chanson de Saisnes ("Song of the Saxons") contains the line:

Ne sont que III matières à nul home antandant,
De France et de Bretaigne et de Rome la grant.

"There are but three matters for the understanding man:
Of France, and of Britain, and of great Rome."

- the "Matter of Rome", or retellings of stories from classical antiquity
- the "Matter of Britain", concerning King Arthur and related topics
- the "Matter of France", concerning Charlemagne and his paladins

Bodel contracted leprosy in 1202 or 1205, and entered a leprosarium. He then wrote a long farewell, "Les Congés", his most personal and touching work.
