= Doon de Mayence =

Hero from old French epic

Doon de Mayence (Note: Written into ms. C in a modern hand.) was a fictional hero of the Old French chansons de geste Doon de Maience and later French prose renditions such as Doolin de Maience (1501) and or Doolin de Mayence (1530).

Doon de Mayence is also the name of the third cycle of the Charlemagne romances, grouping together works that deal with feudal revolts.

== Chanson of Doon de Maience ==
The chason de geste about the exploits of Doon himself (Doon de Maience) came later than the chansons about other rebels (Cf. § Cycle and historical models below). The first half, a separate romance dealing with his romantic childhood, is a fiction dating back to the 13th century, while the second half of the poem, detailing Doon’s wars in Saxony, is perhaps based on historical events.

== Manuscripts ==
The manuscripts of the chason de geste are:

- A - Montpellier, University of Montpellier School of Medicine Library, H 247, f. 1r-46v (14th cent.)
- B - Paris, Bibliothèque nationale de France, français, 12563 (15th cent.)
- C - Paris, Bibliothèque nationale de France, français, 1637, f. 1r-50v (15th cent.)

== Cycle and historical models ==
The cycle (or grand geste) of Doon de Mayence, also called the Rebellious Vassal Cycle (cycle des barons révoltés) and loosely defined, artificially grouped together a number of chansons de geste that had to do with legendary "rebel barons" opposing Charlemagne, which originally did not have a unified story underlying all of them, but forcibly connected together by inventing fictitious genealogical ties. These rebel baron tales had their historical models who were generally active before (or after) Charlemagne's reign, thus, the insolence shown by the robber baron hints that "Charlemagne" is used in the tale in name only, and actually represents his weaker successors.

The historical model for this rebellious "de Mayence" family is pre-Carolingian, namely the betrayers of the Merovingian monarch Sigebert III: Sigebert's subjects from Mayence (Mainz) who turncoated during the battle fought against Duke Radulf on the banks of the Unstrut in Thuringia, as documented in the Chronicle of Fredegar (iv. 87). Legends of these men were later developed in Italy into a series of stories about criminals.

Other poems that make up Doon de Mayence cycle include the chansons of Ogier the Dane, the four sons of Aymon, and Huon of Bordeaux,Girart de Roussillon, Raoul de Cambrai There is also the poem of his son Gaufrey, the sequel to Doon de Maience, where Gaufrey is in turn the father of Ogier.} (Note: Included in the cycle by Pey.)

Poems such as Gui de Nanteuil and Tristan de Nanteuil now classified as belonging to the Nanteuil cycle (outside the 3 major cycles), but they are still attached to the Doon cycle as the poems about Gaufrey's other children.

The poems about Aymon's nephews (Renaud's cousins) Maugis (Maugis d'Aigremont) and Vivien 'amachour de monbranc (about 1100 verses) are attached to this cycle, but Enfances Vivien and its sequel Chevalerie Vivien are categorized under the Guillaume d'Orange cycle.

The poems Auberi le Bourguignon, Gormond et Isembart are also categorized under the Rebellious Vassal Cycle.

Doon was probably one of the last characters to be clearly defined compared to Ogier, etc., and his chanson Doon de Maience was drawn up partly with the view of supplying a suitable ancestor for the other heroes—in modern terms, a prequel.

== Extended family ==
Doon had twelve sons, of whom the most noteworthy are:

- Gaufrey de Danemarche, the father of Ogier the Dane
- Doon de Nanteuil, whose son Gamier married the beautiful Aye d’Avignon
- Griffon d’Hauteville, father of the arch-traitor Ganelon
- Duke Aymon de Dordone, whose four sons (including Renaud de Montauban) were relentlessly pursued by Charles
- Beuves d’Aigremont, whose sons were the enchanter Maugris and Vivien de Monbranc
- Sevin (or Seguin), the father of Huon of Bordeaux
- Girart de Roussillon, hero, married to Bertha, opponent of Charles
- Others, less renowned

The history of these figures is given in Doon de Mayence, Gaufrey, the romances relating to Ogier, Aye d’Avignon, the fragmentary Doon de Nanteuil, Gui de Nanteuil, Tristan de Nanteuil, Parise la Duchesse, Maugis d’Aigremont, Vivien l’amachour de Monbranc, Renaus de Montauban (or Les Quatre Fils Aymon) and Huon de Bordeaux.
