= Literary cycle =

A literary cycle is a group of stories focused on common figures, often (though not necessarily) based on mythical figures or loosely on historical ones. Cycles which deal with an entire country are sometimes referred to as matters. A fictional cycle is often referred to as a mythos.

== Examples from folk and classical literature ==
=== Western Europe ===
==== The three great western cycles ====
- The Matter of Britain (or the "Arthurian cycle"), which centers on King Arthur and the Knights of the Round Table
  - Historia Regum Britanniae
  - The Vulgate cycle (also known as the Lancelot-Grail)
  - The Post-Vulgate cycle
- The Matter of France (or the "Carolingian cycle"), which centers on Charlemagne and the Twelve Peers
  - Chanson de Geste
    - La Geste de Garin de Monglane
    - Doon de Mayence
    - Garin le Loherain
    - Crusade cycle
      - Knight of the Swan
- The Matter of Rome (or the "cycle of Rome"), which centers on Julius Caesar and Alexander the Great
  - Alexander Romance
    - Roman d'Alixandre
  - Classical mythology
    - The Epic Cycle centering on the Trojan War
      - Roman de Troie
      - Aeneid (Roman d'Enéas)

==== France ====
- The four troubadours Bernart d'Auriac, Pere Salvatge, Roger Bernard III of Foix, and Peter III of Aragon composed a cycle of four sirventes in the summer of 1285 concerning the Aragonese Crusade.
- The Reynard cycle, which centers on the fabular fox Reynard

==== Britain ====
- The Henriad, the four plays of Shakespeare centered on Henry V.
- The Nine Worthies
- Geoffrey Chaucer's The Canterbury Tales

==== Germany ====
- Der Ring des Nibelungen (or the "Ring cycle", adapted from the Nibelungenlied), which centers on the Ring and the Norse pantheon

==== Ireland ====
- The Mythological Cycle, also known as the Cycle of the Gods, which centers on the Celtic pantheon in Irish mythology, the Tuatha Dé Danann
- The Fenian Cycle, which centers on Fionn mac Cumhaill and the Fianna
- The Cycle of the Kings, which centers on the monarchy of Ireland
- The Ulster Cycle, which centers on Cú Chulainn and the Kingdom of Ulster

=== Africa ===
- The Anansi tales, which center on the Ashanti of Ghana trickster spider-spirit Anansi, and its variations in the Americas as Ti Malice and Bouki in Haiti, Br'er Rabbit or John and Old Master in the Southern United States.

=== Asia ===
==== Japan ====
- Two examples of Japanese cycles are: the Matter of Japan (Kojiki, Nihon Shoki, etc.) and the Genji-Heike Cycle (The Tale of the Heike, Gikeiki about Minamoto no Yoshitsune, etc.).
- Also popular are the Soga Brothers and Forty-Seven Ronin cycles.

==== India ====
- The Mahabharata, the world's longest epic poem, many of whose stories deal with the lives of Indian mythological characters, most notably Krishna

=== Middle East ===
- The Epic of Gilgamesh, centering upon the demigod king Gilgamesh and Enkidu
- The Baal Cycle, which centers on the battle of Ba'al Hadad against Yam and Mawat
- The tales of the One Thousand and One Nights, brought together by the frame story of the tale of Scheherazade and Shahryār.
- Nasreddin (1208-1285) is a character in the folklore of the Muslim world from the Balkans to China, and a hero of humorous short stories and satirical anecdotes.
- The Shahnameh (or “The Book of Kings” ) and the legend of Arash the Archer as well as Avesta that make up most of the Persian Mythology, namely, tales of heroes like Rostam and Esfandyar
- The voyages of Sinbad the Sailor, the hero of a cycle of tales of monsters, magical places, and supernatural phenomena met on his successive voyages.
- The Seven Wise Masters

== See also ==
- Book series
- Serial (literature)
- Series fiction
