= Franco-Italian =

Written language from the 13th through the 15th centuries

- Franco-Venetian, Franco-Lombard
- Region: Northern Italy
- Era: Mid 13th century AD-15th century AD
- Language family: Indo-European: Italic; Latino-Faliscan; Latinic; Romance; Italo-Western; Gallo-Italic, Venetian, and Oïl; Franco-Italian
- Writing system: Latin

Language codes
- ISO 639-3: None (mis)
- Glottolog: None

Franco-Italian, also known as Franco-Venetian or Franco-Lombard, in Italy as lingua franco-veneta "Franco-Venetan language", was a literary language used in parts of northern Italy, from the mid-13th century to into the 15th century. It was employed by writers including Brunetto Latini and Rustichello da Pisa and was presumably only a written language, and not a spoken one.

Absent a standard form for literary works of the Gallo-Italic languages at the time, writers in genres including the romance employed a hybrid language strongly influenced by the French language (at this period, the group called langues d'oïl). They sometimes described this type of literary Franco-Italian simply as French.

Franco-Italian literature began to appear in northern Italy in the first half of the 13th century, with the Livre d'Enanchet. Its vitality was exhausted around the 15th century with the Turin copy of the Huon d'Auvergne (1441).

Prominent masterpieces include two versions of the Chanson de Roland, the very first version of The Travels of Marco Polo and the Entrée d'Espagne.

The last original text of the Franco-Italian tradition is probably Aquilon de Bavière by Raffaele da Verona, who wrote it between 1379 and 1407.
