= Huon d'Auvergne =

Huon d'Auvergne is an early modern romance-epic written in Franco-Italian, a hybrid literary language. The earliest manuscript of Huon d'Auvergne has recently been edited; selected segments appeared in print earlier. Far better known is the Tuscan prose version by Andrea da Barberino, dated to the early fifteenth century. One of the first, if not the first, work to incorporate Dante Alighieri's Divine Comedy with direct quotes from Inferno, the romance-epic's language has kept it from wide appreciation. The poetic form, language, and narrative content of the four extant witnesses demonstrate how a synoptic, or simultaneous, online edition of the multiple manuscripts can fulfill the need for reliable texts as well as research about the tradition and trajectory of its exemplars. The online edition project continues in 2025.

== Manuscripts in the Franco-Italian tradition ==
The only surviving witnesses of the work are four manuscripts:

- manuscript P (Padova, Biblioteca del Seminario Vescovile cod. 32), the only version with a lengthy prologue
- manuscript Br (Bologna, Biblioteca dell’Archiginnasio B 3489), a short fragment of a few folios, known as the Barbieri fragment
- manuscript B (Berlin, Kupferstichkabinett 78 D 8 / codice Hamilton 337), dated 1341 in the colophon, that belonged to the library of the Gonzaga; this the only parchment manuscript (the others are paper)
- manuscript T (Torino, Biblioteca Nazionale Universitaria N.III.19), with a similar plot to B, dated in the colophon to 1441

The manuscript texts are not all the same; they hold different and independent versions; these are usually divided into three parts: prologue, epilogue and central part.

The prologue (present only in the P manuscript) and the epilogue (present in manuscripts B and T) are extensive, and narratively independent.

The central part appears in all of the four manuscripts, though with many differing details:

- the approximately 1200 lines that remain in Br (which contains only sections of the central portions, but that stops before the Hell episode) is related to P
- B and T on the other hand agree almost entirely, other than by a few lines with the exception of the Ynide episode, and a missing episode (the siege of Auvergne) confirms their relationship, though neither of the two manuscripts derives from the other

== Andrea da Barberino's prose ==
Andrea da Barberino also produced a prose "romanzo" called Storia di Ugone d'Alvernia in Tuscan prose (in five known manuscripts) where, during the narration of the infernal catabasis written in terzine, the prose functions as a gloss, appearing between poetic lines to clarify meanings details.

== Editions and translations ==
- Morgan, Leslie Zarker (ed.) and Shira Schwam-Baird, Huon d’Auvergne: An Edition and Translation of the Fourteenth-Century Chanson de geste in Berlin, Kupferstichkabinett MS 78 D 8, Cambridge, D.S. Brewer: 2025. ISBN 9781843847281.
