= Matter of France =

Body of Medieval literature associated with the history of France

The Matter of France (French: matière de France), also known as the Carolingian cycle, is a body of medieval literature and legendary material associated with the history of France, in particular involving Charlemagne and the Paladins. The cycle springs from the Old French chansons de geste, and was later adapted into a variety of art forms, including Renaissance epics and operas. It was one of the great European literary cycles that figured repeatedly in medieval literature.

== Three Matters ==
The Matter of France was one of the "Three Matters" repeatedly recalled in medieval literature, the others being the Matter of Britain, relating to the legends of Great Britain and Brittany, and the Matter of Rome which represented the medieval poets' interpretations of Ancient Greek and Roman mythology and history. The three names were first used by the twelfth-century French poet Jean Bodel, author of the Chanson de Saisnes, a chanson de geste in which he wrote:

Ne sont que III matières à nul homme atandant,
De France et de Bretaigne, et de Rome la grant.

Translation:

"With only three matters should man concern himself:
Of France, and of Britain, and of Rome the great."

== Description ==
A quote by Bertrand de Bar-sur-Aube in around 1215 from his book Girart de Vienne subdivides the Matter of France into three cycles:

At Saint-Denis, in the great abbey, we find it written (I don't doubt) in a book of noble lineage that there have been only three gestes in well-defended France (I think no-one will argue with me now).

The lordliest is that of the kings of France.

The next, it is right to say, was of Doon of the white beard, he of Mainz who had many lands. In his lineage were fierce and rugged people; they would have had the lordship of all of France, its power, its knighthood, but they were proud and jealous. Of that lineage, so full of treachery, was Ganelon who by his treason caused great sorrow in well-defended France when he committed in Spain the great felony that caused the death in pagan land of the Twelve Peers of France. You have heard tell in many a song that from the geste that came from Ganelon many a great knight was descended, fierce and bold and of very great fame. They would have been lords of the whole realm of France, but there was pride and treason in them. Through pride (we tell you truly) many a high-placed man has been thrown to earth, as were the angels in heaven (we know it in truth) who, for their crime, were thrown into the prison of hell where they will feel nothing but eternal pain. They lost the holy mansion of heaven by their pride and folly. Just so were Ganelon's kin, who would have been so powerful and famous if they had not been so full of treason. Of this lineage, which did nothing but evil, was the second geste.

The third geste, which was much to be praised, was that of Garin de Monglane of the fierce countenance. In his lineage I can well testify that there was not a single coward or good-for-nothing or traitor or vile flatterer; rather they were wise and bold knights and good fighters and noble warriors. Not once did they wish to betray a king of France; they strove to help their true lord and to advance his honour everywhere. They promoted Christendom and destroyed and confounded Saracens. This Garin of the fierce countenance had four sons; never were there bolder knights, I think, so that in a whole day one could not describe their prowess. The first son (I will not lie to you) was the fierce Hernaut of Beaulande. The second, as I have heard tell, was the praiseworthy Milon of Apulia. The third was Renier of Geneva, and the fourth was lord Girart the warrior.

— (Girart de Vienne lines 8–67; translation after J. J. Duggan)

The cycles can be outlined as follows:

- The Geste du roi, whose chief character is Charlemagne, seen as champion of Christianity. This cycle contains the best known of the chansons, the Chanson de Roland.
- La Geste de Garin de Monglane, whose central character was Guillaume d'Orange, identifiable with William, Count of Toulouse. These dealt with knights who were typically younger sons, not heirs, and who seek land and glory through combat with the Infidels. The twenty-four poems of this geste belong to the generation after Charlemagne, during the reign of an ineffectual Louis. The Chanson de Guillaume is one of the oldest poems of this geste.
- The Geste de Doon de Mayence, in which the hero, as in the Geste de Guillaume, often suffers from royal injustice, but is goaded into rebellion.

Central figures of the Matter of France include Charlemagne and his paladins, especially Roland, hero of The Song of Roland, and his companion Oliver, who was frequently cast in conflict with the Muslim champion Fierabras. Originally, the Matter of France contained tales of war and martial valour, being focused on the conflict between the Franks and Saracens or Moors during the period of Charles Martel and Charlemagne. The Chanson de Roland, for example, is about the Battle of Roncevaux Pass during the Moorish invasion of southern France. As the genre matured, elements of fantasy and magic tended to accrue to the tales. The magic horse Bayard, for example, is a recurring figure in many of the tales.

The fundamental character of the "Matter of France" is feudal and Christian (in a crusading form). Although viewed as idolators, the Saracens were not necessarily depicted as un-chivalrous. The earliest gestes were likely sung by a jongleur, accompanied by a fiddle. It is apparent that the authors were ignorant of the fact that Islam is monotheistic. D. J. A. Ross says that people of the Middle Ages appear to have regarded the gestes as generally historical.

Einhard's Vita Caroli describes the Basque ambush at Roncevaux as driving the Frankish rearguard down the valley. The poet who wrote the Chanson de Roland did not hesitate to update the military tactics to a set-piece cavalry charge on the part of the Saracens, although retaining a landscape unsuitable for couched lances.

== List of works ==
For a list of chansons that can be attached to each of these cycles, see Chanson de geste.

Also see Category:Films based on the Matter of France and Category:Works based on the Song of Roland.

== In later literature ==
After the period of the chanson de geste, the Matter of France lived on. Its most well known survival is in the Italian epics by Matteo Maria Boiardo, Ludovico Ariosto, and a number of lesser authors who worked the material; their tales of Orlando innamorato ("Roland in Love") and Orlando furioso ("Roland Gone Mad") were inspired by the chansons de geste. These works, in turn, inspired Torquato Tasso's Gerusalemme liberata and Edmund Spenser's The Faerie Queene, although these latter works have been separated from the Matter of France and put in the respective settings of the First Crusade and an imaginary faerie land.

Tales of the Matter of France were also found in Old Norse, where the Karlamagnus Saga was written in the thirteenth century in Norway; it contains a synopsis of the main stories of the cycle. Indeed, until a major revival in the 19th century breathed new life into the Arthurian cycle, the Matter of France had enjoyed similar renown to the Matter of Britain.

Salita at buhay nang doce pares sa Francia, "Word and life of the twelve pairs of France", a Tagalog corrido from 1920.

Modern fantasy literature has used the Matter of France far less than the Matter of Britain, although L. Sprague de Camp and Fletcher Pratt set one of their Harold Shea stories (The Castle of Iron) in the world of the Matter of France, and Poul Anderson's Three Hearts and Three Lions references the Matter of France. Through Anderson's book, the Matter of France also had some influence on the popular Dungeons & Dragons game. Italo Calvino's fantasy novel The Nonexistent Knight also takes place in this world.
