= Morgante =

1478 poem written by Luigi Pulci

Morgante (sometimes also called Morgante Maggiore lit. 'Greater Morgante', the name given to the complete 28-canto, 30,080-line edition published in 1483) is an Italian romantic epic by Luigi Pulci which appeared in its final form in 1483; a now-lost 23-canto version likely appeared in late 1478; two other 23-canto versions were published in 1481 and 1482. The work was commissioned by Lucrezia Tornabuoni.

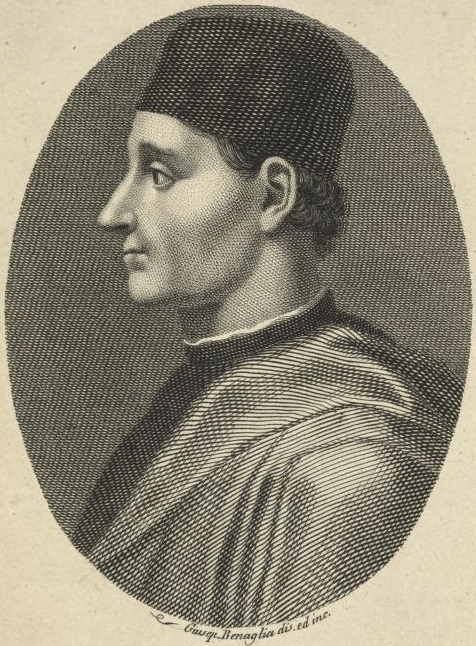
Portrait of Luigi Pulci

Based on popular Matter of France material, the poem tells the story of Orlando and Renaud de Montauban (in Italian, Renaldo or Rinaldo), the most famous of Charlemagne's paladins, in a frequently burlesque fashion. The title character is a giant who becomes Orlando's loyal follower after the knight stops him from attacking the monastery of Chiaromonte and converts him to Christianity. After many strange adventures, Morgante is killed by a bite from a crab. Other characters include Morgante's friend, the gluttonous Margutte, who dies in a fit of laughter, and the philosophically inclined demon Astarotte. The poem ends with an account of Orlando's defeat and death at the Battle of Roncesvalles.

The last five cantos of Pulci's work are based on La Spagna, a 14th-century Italian epic attributed to the Florentine Sostegno di Zanobi.

Lord Byron translated the first canto of Morgante in 1822. In 1983 the Italian-American poet Joseph Tusiani translated in English all 30,080 verses of this work, subsequently published as a book in 2000 by Indiana University Press.
