= Luigi Pulci =

Italian diplomat and poet (1432–1484)

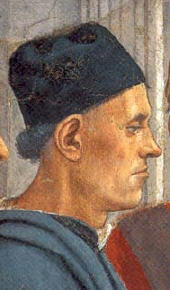
Luigi Pulci in a fresco by Filippino Lippi.

Luigi Pulci (Italian pronunciation: [luˈiːdʒi ˈpultʃi]; 15 August 1432 – 11 November 1484) was an Italian diplomat and poet best known for his Morgante, an epic and parodistic poem about a giant who is converted to Christianity by Orlando and follows the knight in many adventures.

== Life ==
Pulci was born in Florence. His patrons were the Medicis, especially Lucrezia and Lorenzo Medici, who often sent Pulci on diplomatic missions. Even so, sometime around 1470 Pulci needed more money and went into the service of Roberto Sanseverino d'Aragona, a northern condottiere. In 1478 (after the assassination of Lorenzo's brother Giuliano during the Pazzi Conspiracy), Pulci, riding on the coattails of the city's current anti-clericalism, wrote a poem dedicated to Lucrezia Tornabuoni that fulminated against Pope Sixtus IV's Rome.

His brother Luca Pulci (1431–1470) was also a writer. His brother Luca's works, all in the Italian language, include Pistole, Driadeo d'amore, and Cyriffo Calvaneo.

== Morgante ==
The poem Morgante is composed of 28 cantari (chapters) written in ottava rima. The subject was loosely derived from the Carolingian epic tradition, but Pulci drew many characters and motives also from the popular poems usually sung by storytellers in Florence's piazzas and developed a rich series of comic and parodistic episodes. The work was commissioned by Lucrezia Tornabuoni, the mother of Lorenzo and Giuliano Medici. The poem in progress was read at the Medicis' court, where the public appreciated the funny characters, partly new, partly recreated from the epic tradition. Popular Florentine humour, bourgeois way of thinking and living, and free imagination are expressed in a language based upon the Florentine dialect and extends from criminal argot to literary or scientific Latin. This language is very far from the early Renaissance classicistic model, proposed by Poliziano in those same years in the Medicis' court.

== See also ==
- Torre dei Pulci

== Sources ==
- Tomas, Natalie R. (2003). The Medici Women: Gender and Power in Renaissance Florence. Aldershot: Ashgate. ISBN 0754607771.
