= The Song of Roland (film) =

1978 French drama film

- Directed by: Frank Cassenti
- Written by: Michèle-Anne Mercier; Thierry Joly; Frank Cassenti
- Produced by: Jean-Serge Breton
- Starring: Klaus Kinski
- Cinematography: Jean-Jacques Flori
- Edited by: Annie M. Mercier
- Music by: Antoine Duhamel
- Distributed by: Gaumont Distribution
- Release date: 4 October 1978
- Running time: 110 minutes
- Country: France
- Language: French

The Song of Roland (French: La Chanson de Roland) is a 1978 French drama film directed by Frank Cassenti and starring Klaus Kinski.

== Cast ==
- Klaus Kinski as Roland / Klaus
- Alain Cuny as Turpin / Le moine
- Dominique Sanda as Anna
- Pierre Clémenti as Olivier / Le clerc
- Jean-Pierre Kalfon as Marsile / Turold / Charlemagne
- Monique Mercure as Marie
- Niels Arestrup as The merchant / Oton
- Serge Merlin as Pair Marsile / Ganelon / Thierry
- László Szabó as Duc Naimes / Chevalier hongrois
- Bruno Moynot as Pair Charlemagne / A pilgrim / A monk
- Mario Gonzáles as Blancandrin / Jeannot, le voleur
- Yvan Labejoff as Turgis / L'esclave noir (as Yvan Labejof)
- Isabelle Mercanton as Femme commerçant
- Dominique Valentin as La fille du seigneur
- Marilu Marini as La femme du seigneur
- Jean-Claude Brialy as Le Seigneur
