= Roland og Magnus kongen =

Norwegian ballad

Roland og Magnus kongen (lit. 'Roland and King Magnus') also known under the English title "Roland at the Battle of Roncevaux" is a Norwegian ballad about the legendary hero Roland of Charlemagne's court. The ballad is cataloged NMB 171 (Ådel Blom ed., Norske mellomalderballadar), and categorized TSB type E 29. In the ballad, Roland's sword (known in Old French as Durendal) is compared to a sickle, its name corrupted to Dvælje-Dvolg (Dvelgedvolg, Dvergedolg, Dvelgedolgen), explained as meaning "dwarf-fiend" or "enemy of the dwarfs" (Note: Groven's text has Dvælje=Dvolg (stanzas 12, 13), Dvælge=Dvolg (stanza 21); in (Landstad 1853 normalizes these as Dvelgedvolg (stanzas 15, 16, 25); Liestøl & Moe 1912 further emends to Dvergedolg stanzas 22 and 23, and in the notes, p.vii, explains the name as a folk corruption of Old Norse "Dvergadólgar" to be construed as «dverge-fienden».) Storm was of the opinion that the ballad could not be younger than the end of the 15th century, and Halvorsen also said it "must have been handed down orally since the late Middle Ages".

A near-analogue is the Faroese ballad Runsivals stríð, one of the five shorter ballads or tættir comprising the Karlamagnusar kvæði (CCF 106). Both the Norwegian and the longer Faroese piece draw their material from the saga, i.e., Af Rúnzivals bardaga, the eighth branch of Karlamagnús saga. However, due to discrepancies in content, the Faroese ballad is assigned a different type index (TSB E 28).

A traditional melody for this ballad originating in Norway had been collected by Hans Seeberg and Olea Crøger in the 1840s from a singer in Seljord in the Telemark region, but it is seldom used; the Norwegians mostly sing the ballad to a Faroese dance melody which was introduced in 1934 by Klara Semb. This includes a Faroese refrain or "burden" (Faroese: omkvæð, niðurlag) translated into Norwegian by Hulda Garborg. For further details on the melody, see §Melodies below.

== Synopsis ==
The following digest follows Groven's text (version 1, 27 stanzas), a field-collected original, and Landstad's composite (31 stanzas) which uses it as base with additional interpolations. Knut Liestøl and Moe printed a longer reconstructed version with useful annotations (also see §Versions).

King Magnus sends half his twelve peers to heathen land

King Magnus (Charlemagne) divides his men, the twelve peers, so that six stay at home, and the other six accompany him to the land of heathens to test their "cold iron" i.e. weapons. In variant 1 (Groven's text), the opening stanza is the king's speech, as follows:

Groven's ms.:

1. Sex mine Sveiner heime væra
gjøyme dæ Guld i Bolle
dei are sex paa Hedninges Laando
Røne dei Jonni kalle.

normalized spelling:

1. Seks mine sveinar heime vere
Gjøyme de gulli balde
Dei andre seks på heidningslande.
Røyne de jønni kalle.

Espeland's translation:

1. Six of my swains stay at home
hiding the shiny gold
The other six [go] to the heathen land
trying the cold steel.

The next two strophes are considered a later interpolation, consisting of conventional formulaic stanzas ("commonplaces") that describe sailing off to some land. Thus "They hoist their lordly sail high up the sailing-yard (beam horizontal to the mast), to reach the heathen land in two work-days" (Stanzas 2–3). (Note: "two work-weeks" in Bugge's recension or variant 2.) The oars (årene) and anchors they "fasten" to the white sand, and Magnus is first to tread on the land (stanzas 2–3).

Roland's sword and horn are mentioned

Roland's sword and his horn are mentioned. The sword is said to be "clad in scabbard? (klæt i Slire=Vænde)" (Stanza 4), (Note: The reading "Slire=Vænde (Bænde? Baand (sheath-band?)) for the Groven ms. is suggested in one transcription.) and Roland is said to "play the horn (leika mæ lur)." This is the equivalent of the ivory horn known as the Olifant in the original French epic.

In the ballad, Roland's sword is described metaphorically as a scythe or sickle (ljå). (Note: In Groven manuscript, the sword is either "Skonninges Ljaa" or "Konnings Ljoe (stanza 4, line 1).) Landstad inserts a variant reading where the sword is referred to as Gunulfsljóðið or "Gunulf's-tune" (Note: ljóðið is the definite singular form of Norwegian ljod "sound", translatable perhaps as "The Gunulf's-lilt (?)" or "The Gunulf's-steven" to employ an archaism commonly used in ballad translations. Cf. luraljóðið "the horn-tune" in Lanstad's stanza 22. In Old Norse ljóð means "song, lay, poem" which would yield the sword-name "The Lay of Gunulf".) an interpolation from an alternate text. (Note: attested in variant 26, "Ut saa kjæm dæ Gunulfs Lioi.") This "Gunulf" personage has been identified as the traitorous Count Ganelon (Guinelun jarl) who brandished his sword before the heathen King Marsilius in the saga version.

Demanding tribute form the heathens

There follows a series of exchanged dialogues in which Roland demands tribute or "tax (skatten)" from the heathens, is refused, and vows to fight them at "Rusarvodden" or "Ru[n]sarvollen," (Note: Rúsarvollen. Var. Ronsvaldvolden, Ronsvallvollen, Ronsarvolden, Rúsarvollann, Ronsevolden (Landstad 1853, p. 171n, note to stanza 7)) the Roncevaux of the French epic (stanzas 5–7). It has been noted that the ballad "proceeds abruptly and not without confusions," and the dialogue begins with the line "And so the heathen (i.e. heathen king) answered." It was the opinion of Gustav Storm that had the original order of the ballad been intact, it would have been clear that it was Gunulf (Ganelon) rather than Roland making the tax demand. Either way, the Frankish negotiator says: "If we can not get our taxes / from these countries,/ we will on Roncevaux / fight for two days." (stanza 7, Espeland's translation of Groven's text).

Battle of Roncevaux begins, a carnage of heathens

The outbreak of battle at "Rusarvollen" is summarized as follows: "The fighting starts, and they fight for days; the heathens fall before Roland's sword like grass before the sickle or as the snow falls in the mountains, and the sun cannot shine through the steam rising from human blood." (Stanzas 8–9, 22. Landstad 8–10)

The precise language is as follows. This part of the ballad begins: "They were fighting" (Note: sloges emended by Liestøl and Moe as slogest and identified as imperfect tense of slaa. The verb literally means "to beat, strike," etc., however, this verb already appears in the preceding stanza 7, and Espeland translates it as "fight" in this context. Vésteinn Ólason words it as "fighting" in his summary.) at "Rusarvollen" for "two work-days", "two days or three" (Landstad), or "two days" or "three days" depending on which variant. (Note: The "two days or three" wording was also employed in Moltke Møe in his reconstructed ballad for the preceding stanza, to the detriment of the ballad's singability.) "The heathens fall by Roland's sword, like sedge before a good sickle." (stanza 8). A "sedge" is not a true grass, but the word storr used here can loosely refer to any similar grassy plant. (Note: "sedge": "Storr m. Stærgræs (Carex) og lignende stive Græsarter.." i.e., "sedge (Carex) and similar rigid grasses," (Aasen 1873, Norsk Ordbog) Also mentions it is cognate with Icelandic stör. Liestøl & Moe also explains that storr is storrgras.) (Note: "good": go'om is identified as being equivalent to Old Norse góðum, dative singular (of góður) in Liestøl&Moe's notes, p.vi.)

The next stanza is half-repetitive, as it the same phrases as the previous stanza recurs in alternating lines: the armies fought until "they were all wroth (angry)," and the sword felled the heathens like "snow upon the moor (or mountain)" (stanza 9). Landstad remarked that this stanza was sung with particular relish by the Telemark peasantry, who would use variant staves substituting the word blámenn for the heathens.

Peers now weary and outnumbered but Roland refuses to blow horn

At this point Landstad departs from Groven's text, and inserts three stanzas from variants: "They fight.. etc. / tired were the men and weary / The sun could not shine clear / for the fumes (haze, steam) of men's blood" (Landstad's 10, similar to Groven's stanza 22); (Note: "fumes" is used here to translate røg "smoke", but "haze" is used in Espeland's description and "steam" is used in Vésteinn Ólason's summary.) "There came so many black men (or Mussulman, or Moors) / that they shaded the sun / The peers became frightened / And bade Roland to blow the horn" (Landstad's 11); (Note: Vésteinn Ólason summarizes the contents of this stanza though not in the wording given here.) (Note: blámenn in the ballad is rendered "black men" in Vésteinn Ólason's summary, but is explained as Mussulman ("strid med blåmennene, dvs. muslimane") by Solberg. Liestøl and Moe's notes give blaamanns-heri as "maurarheren") (Note: "The peers": jamningann is apparently Landstad's orthography for jemningaenne in Bugge's redaction or variant 2. Liestøl and Moe adopted javningan attested in variant 4 The word javningan is the lexicon in the saga for referring to Charlemagne's twelve peers.) "Roland answered in anger, / from him flowed blood and froth / I shall hew such a hew / that they shall ask (about it?) till Judgment (or Doomsday)" (Landstad's 12).

Roland's sword Dvelgedolg breaks

Roland wants to save his stalwarts (drengir), (Note: Drengir, plural of dreng explained as "a worthy man, or a man as men should be".) he hews his sword asunder, and now the wrecked sword he was holding resembled "the long drill", or "boring-tool (borið)" (Groven's stanza 10; Landstad's 13). Roland, the king's kinsman, (Note: frenden, frende is glossed as a relative of a side lineage, cousin, especially sister-son (Aasen 1873, Norsk Ordbog); Landstad (p.172n) footnotes that in the saga, Roland is the son of Charlemagne's sister Bertha."Roland, the king's kinsman" is the phrasing in Vésteinn Ólason's summary.) thinking he is in dire straits, deplores out loud in speech to God and Mother Mary that his sword is being dragged away from his hand (stanza 11; Landstad's 14).

King of Heathens (or King Magnus) commands his men to pry away the sword but they fail

The speaker now evidently switches to the king of heathens, who commands his men to go and try to wrest away Roland's sword Dvælje=Dvolg (var. Dvelgedvolg, Dvergedolg, Dvelgedolgen) (Stanza 12, Landstad's 15). The ballad specimen's original construct where the heathen king is speaking here is preserved in some printed editions, such as the one summarized by Vésteinn Ólason (1991). (Note: "The heathen king tells his men to take the sword from Roland's hand, but they cannot do it," Vésteinn Ólason's summary.) However, Gustav Storm (1874) had argued that King Magnus was the original speaker of this stanza, and in its uncorrupted state it would have been his knights rather who attempt and fail to take the sword, conforming to the sequence of events in Karlamagnús saga. Likewise, Liestøl & Moe (1912) undertook to reconstruct the ballad consistent with the saga, but to do so, had to considerably alter the arrangement of stanzas, shifting a whole sequence of events before this speech. The English summary in The Types of the Scandinavian Medieval Ballad follows this rearranged plot-sequence. These men return and report that "we could not get the sword Dvælje=Dvolg from Roland's hand." (stanza 13. Landstad's 16).

Roland blows his horn (three times?)

A sequence of three stanzas describe Roland blowing his horn to summon aid. It roughly parallels the events in the saga where Roland blows the horn not once, but a second, and then a third time. And here the language of "the ballad echo[es] the wording the saga" more than elsewhere, with the use of the "bloody mouth" motif.

The first of the three horn-blowing stanzas runs: "Roland put the horn upon his bloody mouth / he blasted it with such fury / wall and earth were riven / as far as nine-day's journey apart" (stanza 14. Landstad's 17). In Groven's text, the subsequent two strains reuse the "wall and earth were riven" phrase three times over, but other variants vary the language. Some variants state that Roland "blew his eyes out of his skull" (han bles sine augor or haus), a graphic detail missing in the Groven text, but closely matched by the saga and the Faroese ballad where his brain bursts out. (Note: "blew his eyes out of his skull" - Three strains from Sophus Bugge's recension (variant 2) are quoted and translated by Vésteinn Ólason. The parallel to saga and Faroese ballad are noted here.)

King Magnus and his reinforcements arrive too late; King Magnus recovers Roland's sword

In Karlamagnús saga, Roland does not die immediately after blowing out his brain with the second blast of his horn. In the ballad, it is not explicitly sung when Roland's death occurs after he blows his horn (blows his eyes out), but the assumption is that by the time King Magnus arrives Roland lies dead. In the subsequent stanzas, Magnus hurries to the scene with longing and anguish and finds Roland pointing the sword out as if he wishes the king to take it (stanzas 18–19, Landstad's 23–24). So Magnus is able to take the sword effortlessly, where the others failed ("the others" being either the Saracens or the king's men, as discussed above).

Fighting resumes at Rusarvollen, King Magnus avenges Roland and the other fallen men

There follows a sequence which are exact repetitions of previous description of the battle, or very nearly so (stanzas 20–22). (Note: To be precise, stanza 22 which invokes the imagery of "the fumes (haze, steam) of men's blood" is fresh verse in Groven's text, but a near verbatim repeat of it occurs in Landstad's 10th and 26th stanzas.) But it is not the early battle being re-sung in refrain, but round two of hostilities, taken up by the Emperor (King Magnus) to avenge the death of his men. The ballad has also forgotten that in the chanson or the saga, no one brandishes Durendal (Dyrumdali) after Roland's death, and the sword Dvelgedvolg of the ballad is used by someone in battle after its recovery.

King Magnus returns home, griefstricken though victorious.

The ballad tells that King Magnus came home, the men all crimson, ships loaded with silver and gold, and all the heathens dead (Stanza 23, Landstad's 27). This is the end of the genuine ballad fragment according to Storm, although there are four more stanzas in Groven's text and Landstad's printed version. Only two of these are included in Liestøl and Moe's rendition. The queen asks King Magnus what troubles him and he replies that Roland is dead, and many worthy men besides.

== Versions ==
In the 19th century were collected two recorded transcriptions of the more or less full ballad. Fifty variants are counted in total, but most of these are only one, two or three stanzas long, and probably served as stev or "stave" strophes. In addition, early collectors printed their own reconstructed versions, pieced together using various recensions and the Old Norse saga.

A 27-stanza transcript was obtained from Laurans Groven (Lavrans Gunleiksson Groven, 1801–1842) of Seljord Municipality in Telemark, in the 1840s by collector Olea Crøger. The manuscript that Landstad used, which he called the old vise-fusse (lit. "ballad bundle", term for a collection of ballads), must have been none other than Groven's manuscript according to recent scholars, although Gustav Storm (1874) had stated that Landstad made use of a ballad-book called Huvestadbibelen dating from slightly before or after 1800. (Note: Espeland 2000, p. 23 says that the manuscript was written by Groven ca. 1800, but this could hardly be so if Jonsson and Solberg's 1801 birthyear is correct. Solberg says Groven was not an old man, but survived in the nick of time for Crøger to collect the transcript.) Storm goes on to say that the recension was fragmentary (lacking a beginning), since the first verse that survives occurs on leaf no. 7. Either way, Landstad produced a 31-stanza reconstruction of the ballad, which he printed in his collection published 1853.

A 26-stanza transcript, unattributed as to performer or locale, but not substantially different in text was recorded by Sophus Bugge in 1867, in a manuscript which became part of the Norsk Folkeminnesamling (NFS) collection, maintained by the Norwegian Folklore Society.

In Liestøl and Moe edd., Norske Folkevisor fra middelalderen (1912) is a reconstructed version of the ballad, of 28 stanzas divided into VII scenes. It contains fabricated stanzas, new words not in the Norwegian language, and deliberate archaizing, and as with other ballads retouched by Moe, have been systematically cleansed of the influence of Danish written balladry. Velle Espeland provides instances comparing Groven's text vs. Moe's reconstruction. Moe did not find it suitable that in stanza 1 King Magnus (=Charlemagne) should refer to his twelve peers as swein (swain), therefore he replaced it with the neologism jall, derived from Norse jarl attested nowhere in Norwegian balladry. (Note: Cf. javningan, word for Charlemagne's peers in the saga, which appears in Moe's stanzas 7 and 11 as well as ballad specimens (as Javningan in variant 4, and jemningaenne in variant 2.) Moe also altered episodes in the ballad so it would conform with Karlamagnus saga. An instance of the retooling of the plot has been described as follows: "In Groven’s text it is the heathens who seek to take the sword from Roland while he is alive. In Moe’s reconstruction it is the king’s men who try to get the corpse to loosen its grip on the sword." Moe's version, though not purely genuine, gained preeminent familiarity as the authentic version, and was taught in textbooks and anthologized in collections.

== Melodies ==
"Roland satte Ludren fer bladga Munne"

The contribution by Olea Crøger as pioneer collector of folk ballad and melody had been largely unrecognized until the 20th century, But the traditional Norwegian tune to Roland og Magnus kongen had been collected by her, Øystein Gaukstad, who took up the legacy of Norwegian ballad-tune collecting after Lindeman, has named "Roland og Magnus Kongen" as one of the dozen-odd most important of her repertoire. Although her manuscripts are lost, the musical notes are preserved in Lindeman's 1851 manuscripts, entitled "Roland", to the lyrics of the single stanza variant 26 that begins "Roland satte Ludren fer bladga Munne" (Note: Gaukstad says the first 57 of the tunes in Lindeman's 1851 record essentially derives from Crøger's collection.) The melody's score is also printed in Landstad's Norske folkeviser (1853). (Note: Gaukstad says33 of 114 melodies appendixed in Landstad came from Crøger.)

The Faroese ballad melody, which has largely supplanted the Norwegian melody, is published online by the Norwegian Visearkivet.

== English translations ==
- Vésteinn Ólason (1991), "Literary Backgrounds of the Scandinavian Ballad", in Harris, Joseph (ed.), The Ballad and oral literature, Harvard University Press, pp. 116–138, ISBN 9780674060456 (pp. 125–127) - prose summary of the composite version of Blom and Bø ed., No. 36.
- *Jonsson, Bengt R.; Solheim, Svale; Danielson, Eva (1978). The Types of the Scandinavian Medieval Ballad: A Descriptive Catalogue (snippet). Institute for Comparative Research in Human Culture, Series B, Skrifter. Vol. 49. Mortan Nolse, Winthrop Edson Richmond. Oslo: Svenskt visarkiv. ISBN 8200016544. - summary of TSB type E 29

== Editions ==
- Landstad, Magnus Brostrup (1853). "14. Roland og Magnus kongin". Norske folkeviser. Christiana: C. Tønsberg. pp. 169–., Musical notes, p. 873
- Liestøl, Knut; Moe, Moltke (1912). "1. Roland aa Magnus kungjen". Norske folkeviser fra middeladeren: med indledninger og anmerkninger. pp. 13–15.
- Heggstad, Leiv (1912). "75. Roland fell paa Rusarvollen". Utsyn yver gamall norsk folkevisedikting. H. Grüner Nielsen. O. Norlis. pp. 42–43.
- Blom, Ådel Gjøstein; Bø, Olav (1973). "No. 36". Norske ballader i oppskrifter frå 1800-talet. Samlaget.

== Discography ==
- Gudrun Grave Nørlund, "Roland og Magnus Kongjen" in Songs and Dances of Norway (Smithsonian Folkways. 1954)
- Alf Cranner, "Roland og Magnus kongen" in Fiine Antkviteter (Philips 1964)
- Erik Bye, "Rolandskvadet", in Norske Folketone (Db Records 1978)
- Malmö Chamber Choir conducted by Dan Olof Stenlund, "Roland og Magnus kongen" in Ludvig Mathias Lindeman : [Norwegian epic ballads and folk songs] (Simax, 1983)
- Veslemøy Solberg, "Roland og Magnus Kongjen", in The Strength of the Runes (Nordicae 1996)
- Glittertind, "Rolandskvadet" in Til Dovre faller (Karmageddon Media 2005)
- Trio Mediæval, "Rolandskvadet (The Song of Roland)" in Folk Songs (ECM Records 2007)
