= Joyeuse =

Sword attributed to Charlemagne

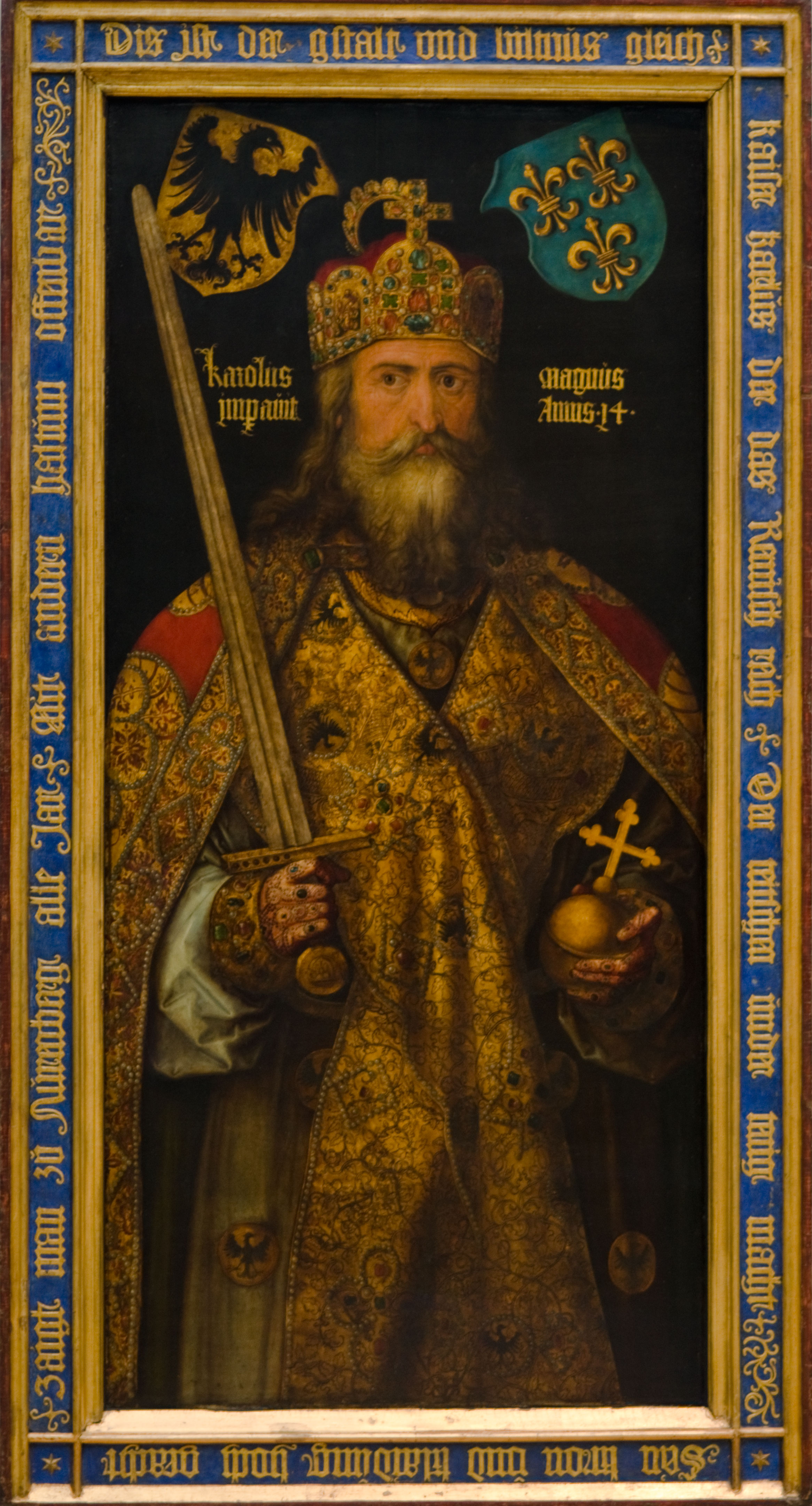
Albrecht Duerer portrait of Charlemagne with Joyeuse

In medieval legend, Joyeuse (pronounced [ʒwajøz]; Old French: Joiuse; meaning 'joyous, joyful') was the sword wielded by Charlemagne as his personal weapon.

In medieval legend, there are several versions regarding its make and origin. There is the topos that it was crafted by Galant (Wayland Smith) as mentioned in the chanson de geste of Fierabras. The hilt of Joyeuse contained a fragment of the Holy Lance that cured Longinus of blindness, and that relic accounted for its "joyous" name, as well as the French war cry Monjoie according to Chanson de Roland. The relic was among the gifts from the Emperor of Constantinople according to the Old Norse sagas. It is possible that young Charlemagne (pseudonym Mainet) while living in Spain had obtained the sword from King Galafre of Toledo, but the French Mainet did not survive complete, but the German version states the sword he got was called Galosovele, while the Spanish version does indeed state that Galfre's daughter Galiana (Galienne, Charlemagne's first wife according to the Mainet tradition) gave Maynet the sword Joyosa. (Note: Cf. Geddes's note to Chanson de Roland, briefly touching on the saga and the Spanish version.)

A sword purported to be Joyeuse was used in French royal coronation ceremonies since the 13th century, and is now kept at the Louvre.

== Legend ==
=== Makers and make ===
Joyeuse was one of three swords crafted by Galans (Wayland Smith) according to the poem Fierabras (cf. Fierabras § 9 swords).

=== Medieval literature ===
Chanson de Roland describes Charlemagne's arms as follows:

Si at vestut son blanc osberc saffrét,
Laciét son elme ki est ad or gemmét,
Ceinte Joiose, onches ne fut sa per,
Ki chascun jorn mudet .xxx. clartez.
Asez savom de la lance parler
Dont nostre Sire fut en la croiz naffrez:
Charles en at la more, mercit Deu,
En l’orét pont lat faite manovrer;
Por ceste honor e por ceste bontét
Li noms Joiose l’espede fut donez.

— Chanson de Roland, Oxford ms. vv. 2499–2508
Translation:

He's donned his white hauberk, with broidery, (Note: "broidery": the meaning of the term saffret/saffré is still disputed, according to Ross (1980), who tentatively rests on "yellow varnished" as the most plausible. Many interpretations assume saffron (yellow) color, e.g., Léon Gautier (1875) who assumed a different colored brass wire wound into the steel links. Lucien Foulet, Glossaire (attached to Bédier ed.) suggested yellow bismuth oxide coloring. While in actual usage, the term seems to signify luxuriant armor dressed with gold and silver, the term saffré etymologically links to cobalt blue according to one source i.e. zaffre, cognate to "sapphire". Jenkins's edition (1929) [1924] glosses safrét as "blue-bordered".)
Has laced his helm, jewelled with golden beads.
Girt on Joiuse, there never was its peer.
Whereon each day thirty fresh hues appear.
All of us know that lance, and well may speak
Whereby Our Lord was wounded on the Tree
Charles, by God's grace, possessed its point of steel !
His golden hilt he enshrined it underneath.
By that honour and by that sanctity
The name Joiuse was for that sword decreed.

— Moncrieff tr. (1920), vv. 2499–2508

thus claiming that Joyeuse was forged to contain the Lance of Longinus within its pommel, and according to the above-quoted text, this holy relic was the cause of the sword getting name Joyeuse; the poem goes on to claim the French war-cry of Monjoie stems from this sword as well.

According to the Old Norse source (Karlamagnús saga, Branch I), Karl's sword received the name Giovise after he placed in the upper part of the hilt a shard of the Holy Lance. This was given him by the Greek Emperor during a sojourn to Constantinople (Miklagard), alongside other relics such as a piece of the True Cross, the sudarium (Old Norse: sveitadúkr) that wiped Jesus's brow, Christ's stockings or hose (Old Norse: hosa), and the spear of Saint Mercurius

Baligant, a general of the Saracens in Chanson de Roland, named his sword Précieuse, in order not to seem inferior to Charlemagne. (Note: Chanson de Roland, Oxford manuscript version, vv. 3145–6)

Even though in the first Branch of Raimbert de Paris's Chevalerie Ogier the amiral Corsuble who headed the campaign against Rome was slain by Naimes, (Note: Barrois ed. (1842), p. lxxij: "L'Emir en suite, 3023; mort 3035. Ogier tue Danemon 3041. texte: "Namles va férir l'amirant (3031).. Grant cop (3033).. mort sanglant (3035)") the 13th century Adenes Le Roi rewrote the story in Enfances Ogier such that Charlemagne steals credit for this kill; Charlemagne, brandishing Joyeuse, struck Coruble on the head, cutting the ring of his helm, so that the blade made incursion into the opponent's brain, and the enemy soon fell dead. Incidentally, this is the only mention of Joyeuse by name in this work. (The differences are discussed in more detail under Ogier the Dane § Adenet le roi). In Raimbert's Branch XII, Charlemagne is described as having killed Faus[s]aron d'outre Morinde with his Joiuse. In Branch IV, Charlemagne, still at war with Ogier as a rebel, is seen girt with the sword Joyeuse and mounted on the horse Blanchard (Note: Also, in Branch II, Blanchart d'Alier, v. 3273; in Branch III, Joiose, 5175, followed by a list of vassals)

In the enfances of Charlemagne, Mainet, the original French poem tells of Charlemagne being driven out of his country by evil stepbrothers, taking refuge under the pseudonym Mainet (diminutive of "Magne",) and fighting a crucial duel on behalf of his Spanish Saracen host King Galafre. But the French poem fragment only mentions Galfre's gift horse, and makes no mention of Joyeuse (Note: The gift of the horse Afilé occurs in Ma IV, but Joyeuse is only mentioned elsewhere in Ma III.) (cf. Durendal § Mainet for more on the duel). The German version mentions the Spanish host giving a sword called "Galosevele", but this is considered to be different from "Gaudeosa", the spelling of Joyeuse in the same German poem. Whereas in the Spanish version, he is indeed given by Galafre's daughter, Galiana (Galienne, later to be his first wife) (cf. § Prince Charles aka Mainet below for details such as names of works).

In the longer version of the Pseudo-Turpin, it is stated that during the fierce battle against Aigolandus in which 40,000 Christians including Roland's father Duke Milo perished, (Note: Latin: "dux Milo Rotolandi genitor") Charlemagne unsheathed his sword Gaudiosa (Note: Middle English: Caudiosa in Turpines Story.) slaying many of the Saracen host.

=== Prince Charles aka Mainet ===
While there is no mention of the sword be given to Charlemagne in the chanson de geste of Prince Charles's youthful exploits in the fragmentary Mainet, (Note: Cf. but Mainet is given the white horse Afilé to fight a duel, and wins Durendal as trophy from it, cf. § Durendal#Mainet) but in its Rhenish German adaptation Karlmeinet Part I, he receives a sword named Galosovele from Gallafers (=Galafre) in the advent of fighting Bremunt/Bremant as Gallafers's champion (Note: And successfully capturing the sword Durendart. Cf. Durendal § Mainet.) Unfortunately, this is not considered to be the same as Joyeuse by commentators. Thus, when the sword Gaudeosa (Joyeuse) occurs later in Karlmeinet Part III, where he is battling against the invasion of Agolant, it is another, different piece of weapon. (Note: Cf. also Moisan's "Joieuse(3)" segregated from "Galosevele", "épée donnée par Galafre à Mainet”.) It is noted that the name-form Gaudeosa probably derives from its Latin source, Pseudo-Turpin.

Contrarily, in the Spanish adaptation of Mainet embedded in the Primera Crónica General, Don Maynet is equipped with none other than Joyosa (Joyeuse), given him by his beloved Galiana, daughter of Galafre, as he faces the challenge of fighting Bramant. Ironically this Joyosa had been a gift to her from her suitor Bramant to Galiana. (Note: So that after fighting and decapitating Bramant, Maynet obtains Durendart and now has two swords from the same former owner.)

== Modern retellings ==
Thomas Bulfinch's Legends of Charlemagne (1864) [1863] includes a retelling of the story of Ogier the Dane, where Ogier's sword Curtana was made of the same steel and temper as Joyeuse and Roland's Durendal. Bulfinch neglected to mention Galan (Wayland Smith) as the maker of these three swords as according to Count Tressan's extracts (1782), which otherwise agrees well with Bulfinch.

The above revelation came from the inscriptions (in gold) written on the steel of Ogier's sword, which the king read when he unsheathed Ogier's sword Curtana, which Morgan le Fay given to Ogier by swapping some sword that the king owned and girt onto Ogier (but not identified as Joyeuse). Note that in the unembellished original chansons de geste Chevalerie Ogier, the king did deign to knight Ogier with a sword he possessed.

While Bulfinch's retelling describes Charlemagne using Joyeuse to behead the Saracen commander Corsuble, this is more or less as according to Adenet le Roi's version (where Charles delivers a cerebral cut, not decapitation), as explained above.

Regarding the relics in the hilt, a children's book from the early 20th century tells that "One priceless thing Charlemagne ever carried in his belt and that was Joyeuse, the Sword Jewellous, which contained in a hilt of gold and gems the head of the lance that pierced our Saviour's side. And thereto he wore a pilgrim's pouch — 'against my faring to Jerusalem, or, if that may not be, to remind me that our life is but a pilgrim's way, and our joy but a pilgrim's rest, and our hope a palm".

== Coronation sword of the French kings ==
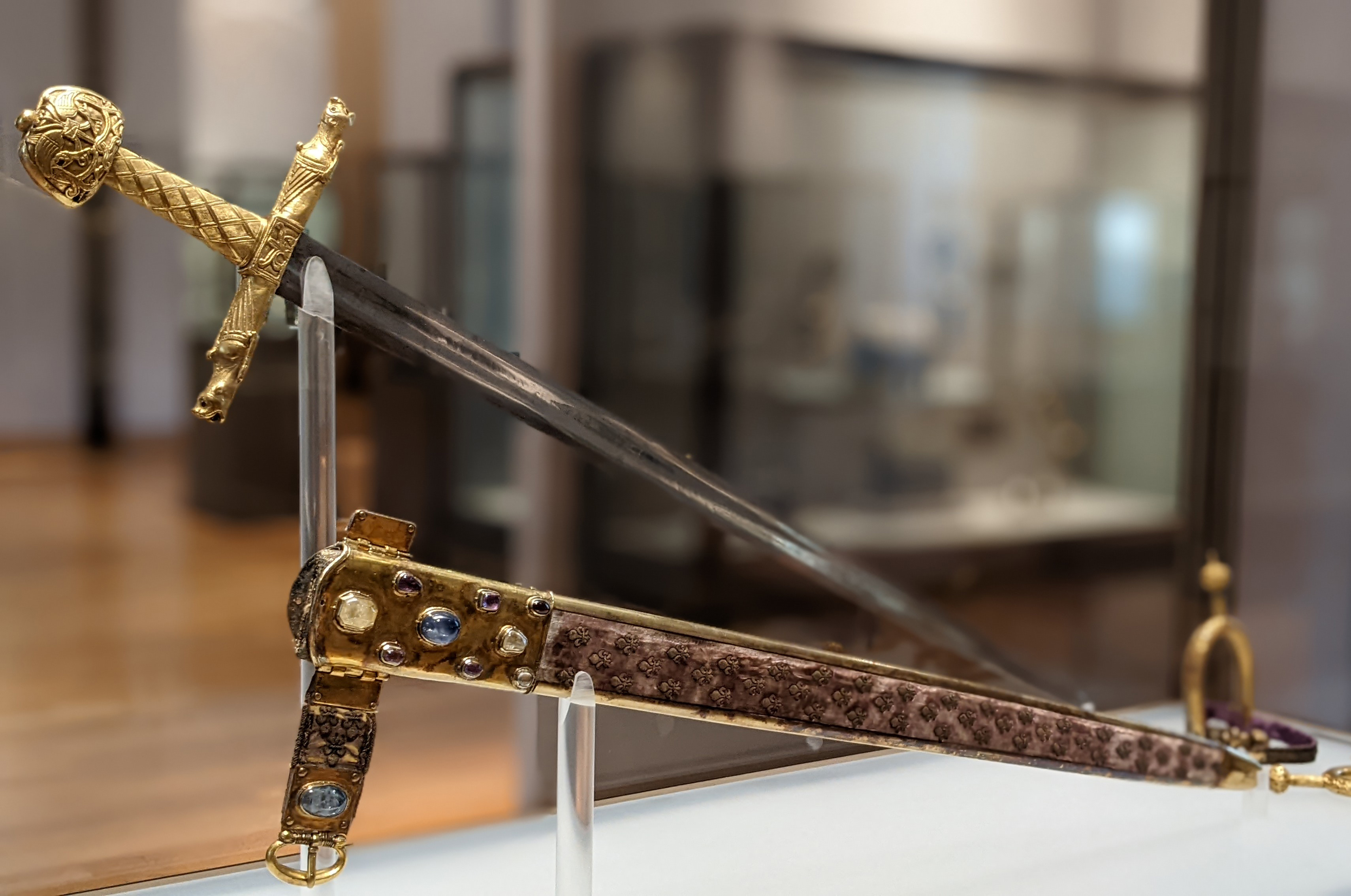
Joyeuse displayed in the Louvre.

Louis XIV with Joyeuse (Hyacinthe Rigaud, 1701)

A sword identified with Charlemagne's Joyeuse was carried in front of the Coronation processions for French kings, for the first time in 1270 (Philip III), and for the last time in 1825 (at the Coronation of Charles X). The sword was kept in the Treasury of Saint-Denis since at least 1505, before it was moved to the Louvre in 1793.

This Joyeuse as preserved today is a composite of various parts added over the centuries of use as coronation sword. But at the core, it consists of a medieval blade of Oakeshott type XII, mostly dated from about the 10th century. Martin Conway argued the blade might date from the early 9th century, suggesting that it was indeed the sword of Charlemagne, while Guy Laking dated it to the early 13th century.

Joyeuse was used as a prop during the coronation of Napoleon at Notre-Dame de Paris in 1804. The count de Ségur charged with staging the ceremony scripted for the inclusion of Joyeuse in some way. However, in the actual event, it was decided it would be inapt for Napoleon himself to wear the sword (Note: Cf. various depictions of the costume, in paintings by Jacques-Louis David or by François Gérard, or the engraving reproduced Esparbès.) both for political and costumery reasons, and it would merely be a part of the procession. (Note: Napoleon needed a suitable theatrical sword, but the one he had which was set with the Regent Diamond had disappeared, and some swords were commissioned, but not enough for his liking to be deemed wearable for the occasion.)

The overall height is 105 cm (41 1/3 in) with the blade portion making up 82.8 cm (32 3/5 in) of that. It is 4.5 cm (1.77 in) wide at the base, and 2.2 cm (0.87 in) thick. Its total weight is 1.630 kg (3.59 pounds).

The Louvre's official website dates the pommel from the 10th to 11th centuries, the crossguard to the 12th and the scabbard to the 13th century.

== Gallery ==
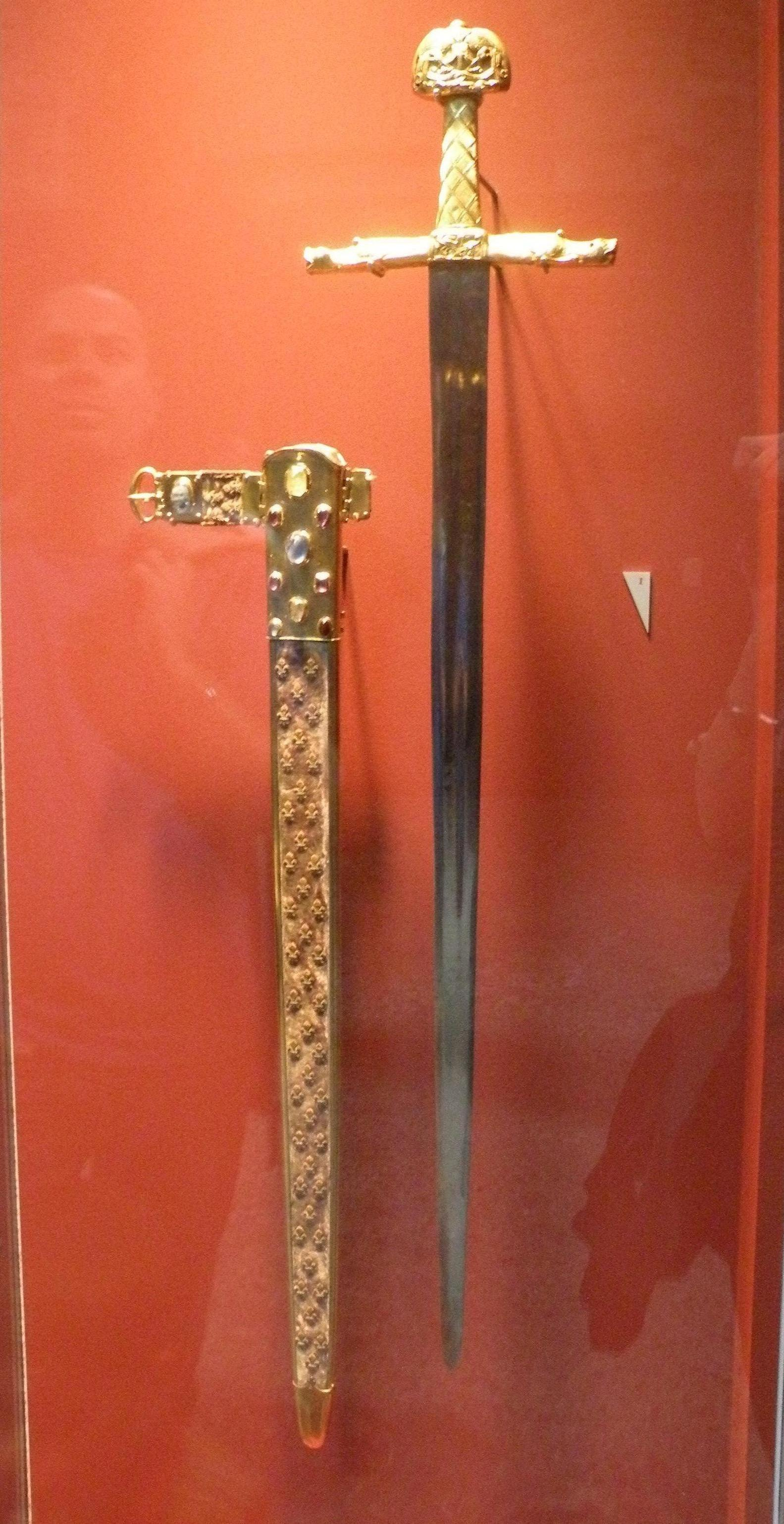
Joyeuse exhibited with its 13th century sheath at the Musée de Cluny in 2012.

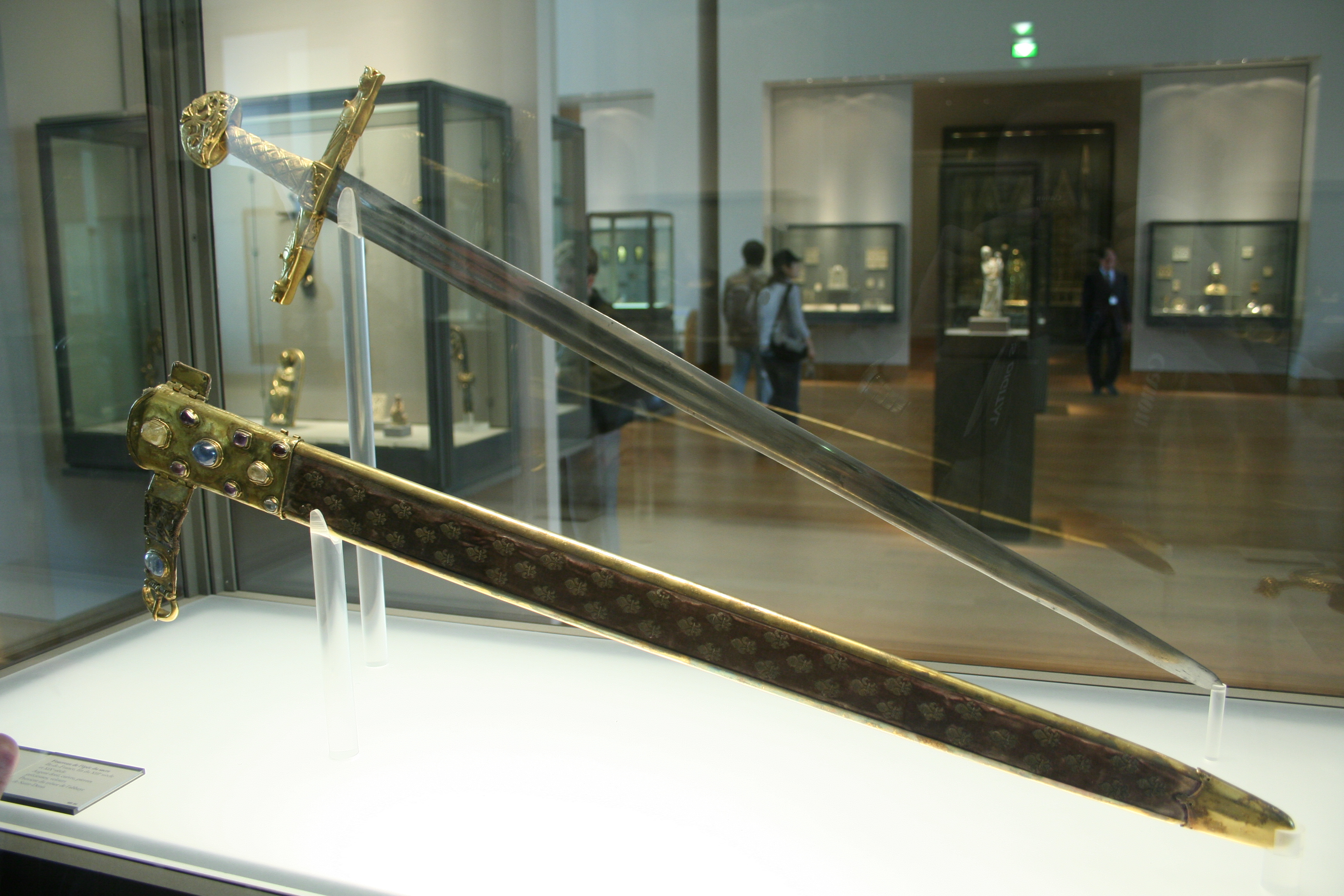
Joyeuse in the Louvre

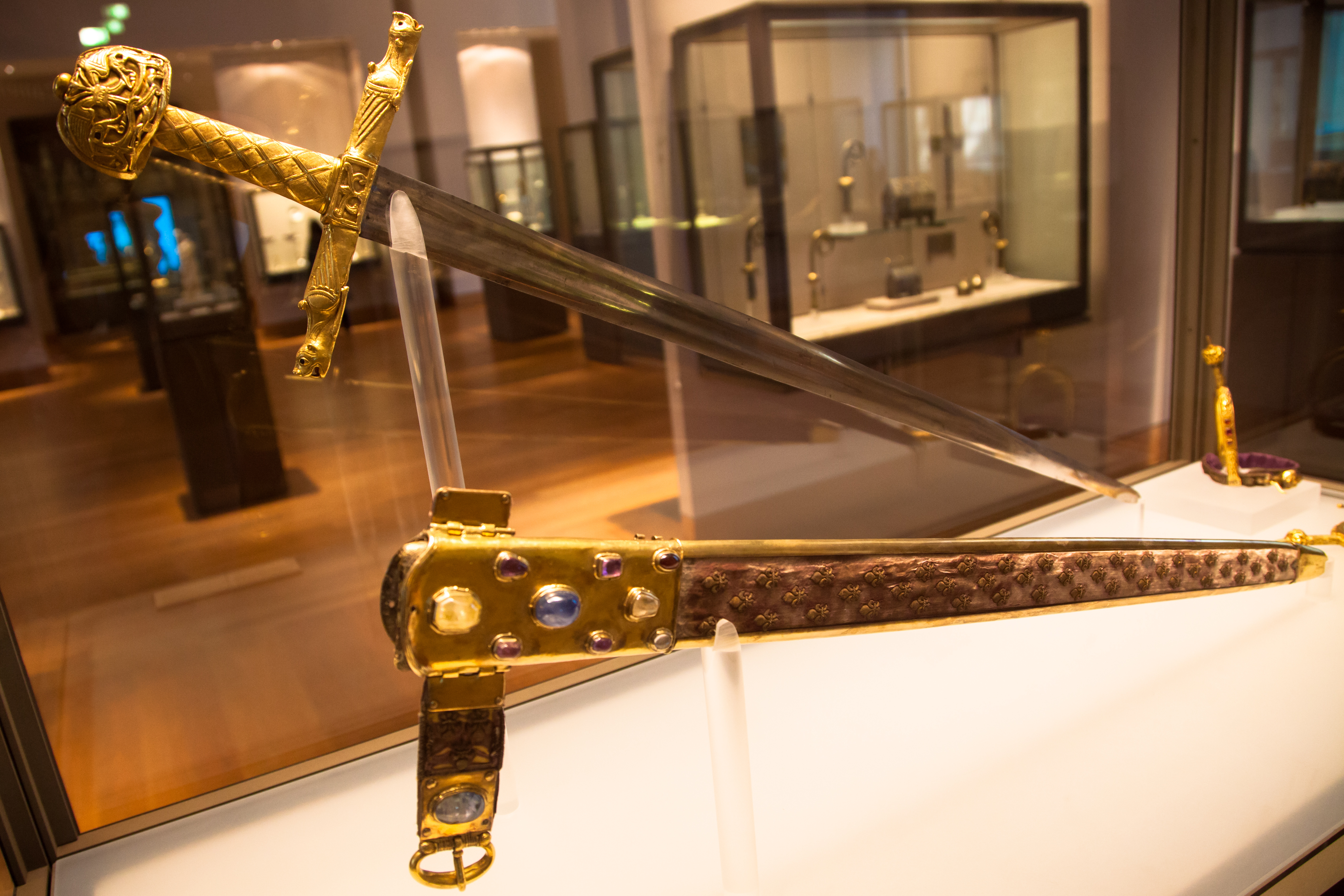
Another view of same

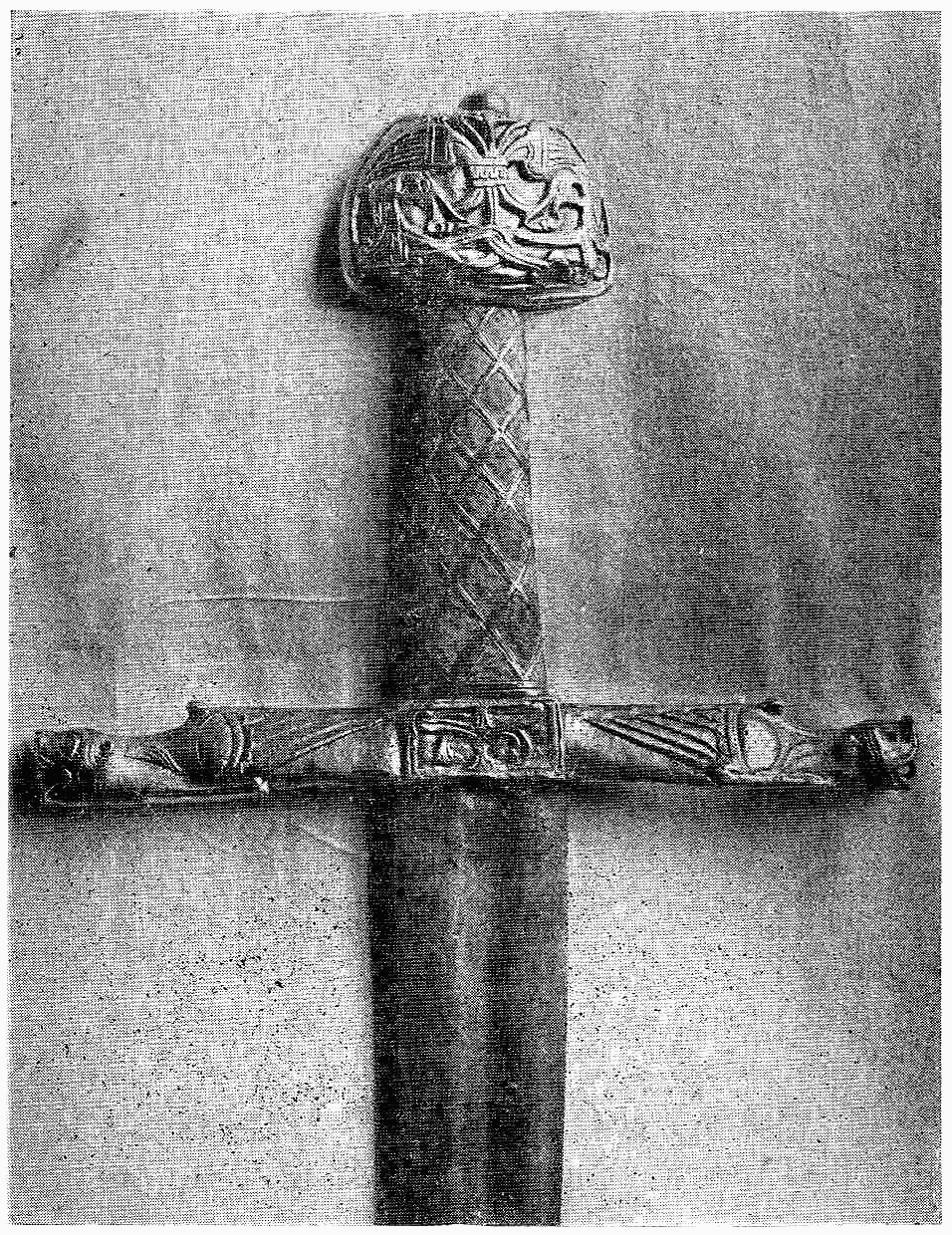
Detail of hilt

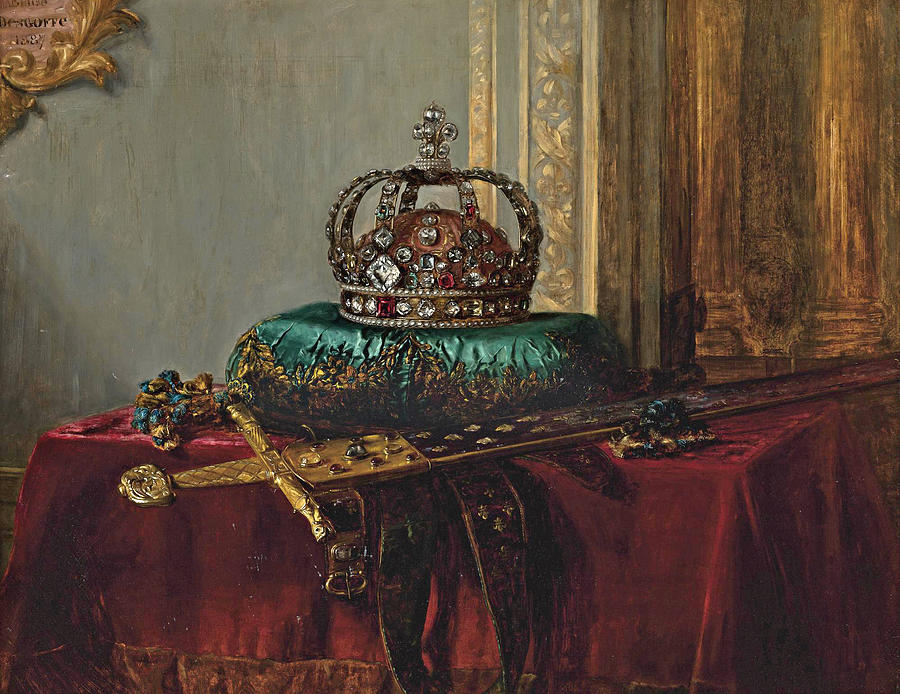
Couronne du sacre des rois de France by Blaise Alexandre Desgoffe, first exhibited at the Exposition universelle de 1878.

== Eponymy ==
The town of Joyeuse, in Ardèche, is supposedly named after the sword. Legend has it that Charlemagne once came through here upon a hill that was inhabited, plunged his sword on the spot and fortified as castle, naming it Joyeuse after his sword.

== See also ==
- Imperial Sword, 12th-century coronation sword of the Holy Roman Emperor
- Sabre of Charlemagne

== Bibliography ==
=== Primary sources ===
(Chanson de Roland)

- Jenkins, Thomas Atkinson, ed. (1929) [1924]. La chanson de Roland: Oxford version (Revised ed.). Boston: D.C. Heath. (alt url)
- Stengel, Edmund, ed. (1900). Das altfranzösische Rolandslied. Kritische Ausgabe. Leipzig: Dieterich. (R.)
- Moncrieff, Charles Scott, tr. (1920). The Song of Roland: Done into English, in the Original Measure. New York: Dutton. Archived from the original on 2010-01-05.

(Ogier)

- Barrois, Joseph, ed. (1842). La chevalerie Ogier de Danemarche. Paris: Techener. Tome 1, Tome 2.
- Adenet le Roi (1874). Scheler, Auguste (ed.). Les enfances Ogier. Matthieu Closson.

(Mainet)

- Paris, Gaston, ed. (1875). "Mainet, fragments d'une chanson de geste du XIIe siècle". Romania. 4. (google) (in French)

(Saga)

- Unger, Carl Rikard (1860). Karlamagnus saga ok kappa hans (in Old Norse and Danish). Christiania: H. J. Jensen.

==== Retellings ====
- Tressan, Louis-Élisabeth de La Vergne de, ed. (1782). "La Fleur des Batailles, ou Histoire de haut fait de Dooolin de Mayence; de Geoffroy son fils, duc de Mayence & de Danemarck; du célèbre Ogier le Danois, duc de Mayence & de Danemarck, l'un des douze Pairs preux de la cour de Charlemagne; & du duc & Preux Mervin, fils d'Ogier le Danois". Corps D'Extraits De Romans De Chevalerie. Vol. 2. Paris: Pissot, père & fils.

=== Secondary sources ===
- Classen, Albrecht (2021). Charlemagne in Medieval German and Dutch Literature. Bristol studies in medieval cultures 9. Boydell & Brewer. ISBN 9781843845836.
- Langlois, Ernest (1904). Table des noms propres de toute nature compris dans les chansons de geste. Parils: Émille Bouillon.
- Ludlow, John Malcolm Forbes (1865). Popular epics of the middle ages of the Norse-German and Carlovingian Cycles. Vol. 2. London: Macmillan. pp. 247–.
- Moisan, André (1986). Répertoire des noms propres de personnes et de lieux cités dans les chansons de geste françaises et les oeuvres étrangères dérivées (in French). Droz. p. 402. ([https://books.google.co.jp/books?id=PGSwSiQCrvMC snippet)
