= Cortana =

Cortana or Curtana may refer to:

- Cortana (gastropod), a gastropod genus
- Cortana (Halo), character in the Halo franchise
- Cortana (virtual assistant), virtual assistant from Microsoft
- Curtana, a ceremonial sword used in the coronation of British monarchs
- Cortain, the sword wielded by Ogier the Dane, Paladin of Charlemagne
