= Tachëbrun =

Fictional warhorse

Tachëbrun ("brownspot") is the warhorse of Ganelon, the treacherous paladin in the French epic, The Song of Roland. Tachëbrun is mentioned in laisse 27 of the poem.
