= Gaignun =

Fictional warhorse

Gaignun ("watch-dog") is the warhorse of Marsile, Saracen king of Spain in the French epic, The Song of Roland. Gaignun is mentioned in laisse 142 of the poem.
