= Naimon =

Alternately Namus, a character in the Matter of France literature

- First appearance: Chansons de geste (e.g., Song of Roland)
- Created by: Unknown (oral tradition)

In-universe information
- Aliases: Naimes, Naime, Naymon, Namo, Namus
- Affiliation: Charlemagne
- Family: Sir Bertram (son, in later romances)
- Role: Advisor, Duke of Bavaria (traditional)
- Characteristics: Wise, trusted advisor, embodies good sense, moderation, and justice

Naimon, Duke of Bavaria, also called Naimes, Naime, Naymon, Namo, and Namus, is a character of the Matter of France stories concerning Charlemagne and his paladins, and appears in Old French chansons de geste (like Song of Roland) and Italian romance epics. He is traditionally Charlemagne's wisest and most trusted advisor.

In the Song of Roland, Naimon supports Ganelon's proposal to make peace with King Marsile. He does not suspect Ganelon's treachery. Later, he organizes the divisions of Charlemagne's army and participates in the battle against Baligant.

In Le Pèlerinage de Charlemagne he is included among the Twelve Peers.

In later romances he is given a son, Sir Bertram.

In Orlando Furioso he appears at the beginning of the story, holding Angelica captive.

Naimon's character may be summarized thus:

This same Naimon, the traditional adviser of the king, this medieval Nestor, this uncompromising advocate of Right against Might, is the most unchanging figure among the heroes. He is the embodiment of good sense, moderation and justice.
