= Bramimonde =

Bramimonde is a character in The Song of Roland. Bramimonde is the Queen of Zaragoza, wife of King Marsile and mother of Jurfaleu the Blond.

Bramimonde is introduced as an unwavering supporter of the Saracens, her husband and the betrayal of Roland; going so far as to kiss his betrayer, Ganelon, in a show of support that was customary at the time. Over the course of the work, she becomes greatly disillusioned with her Muslim faith, as seen in this passage where she grieves over the loss of her husband's right hand by Roland:

"When the Queen Bramimonde heard that her lord had returned, she hurried to him. Then, as she listened to his woful tale, and saw his shattered wrist, from which the right hand was gone, she wept aloud and made a great moan. With terrible curses she cursed Charlemagne and Francia, and she cursed her own heathen gods and idols. Then she threw the image of Apollin down, taking from him his crown and sceptre and trampling him under foot. "Oh, wicked god," she cried, "why hast thou brought such shame upon us? Why hast thou allowed our king to be defeated? Thou rewardest but ill those who serve thee."

The images of Tervagan and Mahomet too she caused to be beaten and broken in pieces, and flung to the pigs and dogs. Never were idols treated with such scorn. "

Upon Charlemagne's army's successful destruction of her city's mosques and synagogues, the forced baptism of her people, the crushing defeat of Baligant, and finally the death of her husband, she readily admits defeat. She is captured and taken to Aix upon her surrender and, unlike her subjects, is allowed to convert to the Christian faith by 'parable and sermon' in recognition of her noble lineage. She was baptised as 'Juliana'.
