= Cortain =

Legendary short sword

Cortain (also spelled Courtain, Cortana, Curtana, Cortaine or Corte) is the short sword of the legendary Ogier the Dane, a paladin of Charlemagne's court. The name is the accusative case declension of Old French corte, meaning "short".

According to Chevalerie Ogier, the sword was lent and formally given by the courteous Saracen Caraheu; it originally belonged to Brumadant le sauvage, and tempered twenty times by the sword smith Esurable, who broke it after testing it 20 times on a marble block, then recrafted it as a shorter sword, hence named "Short".

But according to Renaud de Montauban, it was named "short" because a half-foot of its tip chipped off when tried on a testing-stone at Aix-la-Chapelle castle, and a somewhat similar account is given in the Old Norse Karlamagnús saga. Arthurian literature (Prose Tristan) claims it used to be the broken-tipped sword belonging to Sir Tristan.

An actual sword purported to be Ogier's Cortain was displayed at the monastery of St. Faro (Abbaye Saint-Faron de Meaux), and after the said monastery was razed in the 18th century, there had been a frantic search for the whereabouts of the sword (cf. § Purported swords).

== Terminology ==
The tradition that Ogier had a short sword is quite old. There is an entry for "Oggero spata curta" ("Ogier of the short sword") in the Medieval Spanish/Old Castilian Nota Emilianense (c. 1065–1075), and this is taken as a nickname derived from his sword-name Cortain. The sword name does not appear in the oldest extant copy of The Song of Roland (Oxford manuscript), only in versions postdating the Nota.

Forms in Chanson de Roland:

- Cortein ms. C (Châteauroux) vv. 7774, 7988, var. Corten ms. V: (Venice IV) v. 5792.
- Cortain, ms. P (Paris) v. 4074; ms. T (Cambridge) 3000, 5304, 5497; ms. L (Lyon) 2735.

In the Old French text of Chevalerie Ogier (c. 1194–1200, Corte Cortain spellings are used, (Note: In Chevaleri Ogier the sword name appears first as Corte at v. 1663, and though this spelling is used later several times at vv,. 2965, 8596, etc. the spelling Cortain is more frequent (vv. 1860, 1883, 2701, 2828, etc.). The lines can are listed in Langlois's dictionary.) though its editor Barrois employs the modernized form Courtain in his summary. (Note: Barrois ed. (1842), Analyse p. lxxiij gives Corte, Courtain, but generally Courtain thereafter.) The original owner was the courteous Saracen Karaheu or Caraheu, with a great variety of spellings. (Note: Langlois lists Caraheu, Caraheut, Karaheu, Karaheut, Karaheult, Kareeu" in the entry. The spellings Karahues Karahuel are found in the Barrois edition.)

The sword name also appears in other chansons de geste of a similar date, e.g. Chanson d'Aspremont (<1190) or Renaut de Montauban (aka Quatre fils Aymon, c. 1200). (Note: Langlois's dictionary lists the sources in abbreviation, e.g. RM=Michelant ed. Renaut de Montauban. Brandin ed. Aspremont has its own name index.)

Cortaine is a spelling that occurs in Prose Tristan (part added after c. 1240), where Charlemagne and the paladins discover a cache of relic swords from Arthuriana, and the (supposedly chipped (Note: Tristan's spear/sword chipped off in Morholt/Morolt's skull, and the Irish enemy's poisoned tip lodged in Tristan.)) sword that belonged to Sir Tristan, was assigned by Charlemagne to be given to Ogier the Dane. Courtaine appears in Jean d'Outremeuse Ly Myreur des Histors (1338-1400) echoes this account.

== Further attestations ==
=== Chevalerie Ogier ===
The sword and its early provenance is described in the chanson de geste Le Chevalerie Ogier. It was given to him by Caraheu, the courteous Saracen warrior-king. (Note: Barrois ed. (1842) Chevalerie Ogier, vv. 2700ff. Cf. Analyze, p. lxxij "Caraheu donne son épée a Ogier".) (Note: Cf. also the printed French prose romance of 1579.) Perhaps it was only "given" to him as a loan at first, since it is later stated that Ogier wins the sword Corte together with the horse Broiefort.

In Branch I of the work (sometimes called the enfances portion), (Note: Barrois ed. (1842) divide his edition into 12 branches. Branch I occurs in vv. 1–3100.) Ogier is still an unknighted novice, and a confined hostage at that, but was brought near the theater of war. He was observing as bystander as the French fought back the Saracen incursion into Rome, but Ogier joined the fray, wresting the arms and the flag (oriflamme) from the fleeing standard-bearer Alori. For the achievement of protecting the standard and other deeds, Ogier is knighted, and Charlmagne girds him with a sword he personally owns.

Caraheu/Karaheut (Note: "Karaheut" in Ludlow (1865) and Voretzsch (1931), p. 209. Langlois, lists "Caraheu, Craheut, Karaheu, Karaheut, Karaheult, Kareeu". "Karahues" and "Karahuel" are also used.) of India was son of King Gloriant (var. Quinquenant), brother of Marsile and cousin (relative) of Baligant, as well as being the betrothed of Gloriande, daughter of the amiral Corsuble. Caraheu challenges Ogier to duel, or a double-duel with Sadoine of Nubia (Note: a prince of Nubia, son of Quiquevant. "uns Nubians,/Nom ot Sadones, fix le roi Quiquevant". vv. 750–1) matched against Prince Charlot, to be held on the island in the Tiber (Note: Cf. the illumination in ms. A, fol. 188r. Caraheus accueillant Ogier dans l'île du Tibre.) (Incidentally, Sadoine is armed with a sword made by Wayland, and rides Bonivent, a horse of sultan; Prince Charlot is girt with Joyeuse by the king.).

Carahe/Karaheut is girt with Cortain; it formerly belonged to "Brumadant the Savage" and "the name of its maker was Escurable" according to text, (Note: Old French: Puis çaint l'espée Brumadant le sauvage/Cil qui le fist ot à non Escurable v. 1647–8 (var. ms. A, Brinnamant, ms. M, Brunadon)) (Note: Brumadant is the former wearer of the weapon Caraheus uses against Ogier in duel, according to Charles Dickens, and this is the interpretation here adopted.) (Note: Castets quotes text describing Karaheu's sword, but makes no clarification on Brumadant, except for a variant spelling.) (Note: For some reason, Langlois glossed Brumadant as the name of a sword.) (Note: Others for some reason decided Brumadant was the giant-smith who forged it.) was remade more than twenty times by the swordsmith Escurable; when it was tested on a block of marble it broke about a palm's length, and had to be reforged shorter-bladed; hence it was [re]named Corte or Cortain, (Note: This sword name first occurs as Corte at v. 1663, but is spelt Courtain at v.1860 and most other occurrences in the poem.) meaning "Short". This became the weapon of a chivalric-minded Karaheut, The swordsmith tested it 20 times on a block of marble, but cut clean through, but broke a palm's length upon drawing, so that it had to be reforged, and thus named "Short".

Caraheu/Karaheut gave or lent Cortain to Ogier to face a new opponent, Brunamont of Maiolgre (Note: Brunamont de Maiolgre. Brunamont's homeland Maiolgre is not specified by Langlois, and though Ludlow guesses it to be Majorca in Spain, the variant reading "Calabre" (Calabria, Italy) may suggest somewhere in Italy.) in single combat. (Note: The tangled circumstances leading to Ogier fighting Brunamont were as follows. Karaheu had engaged Ogier in single combat, and expected it to be carried out in a fair fight. But his comrades in large numbers interrupted and took Ogier hostage. Karaheu was horrified, and surrendered himself to the French as hostage. The Amiral disowned Karaheu (broke the engagement of Karaheu to his daughter Gloriande), awarding her to Brunamont. Gloriande objected, and named Ogier as her champion to fight Brunamont.)

==== Blocked by angel ====
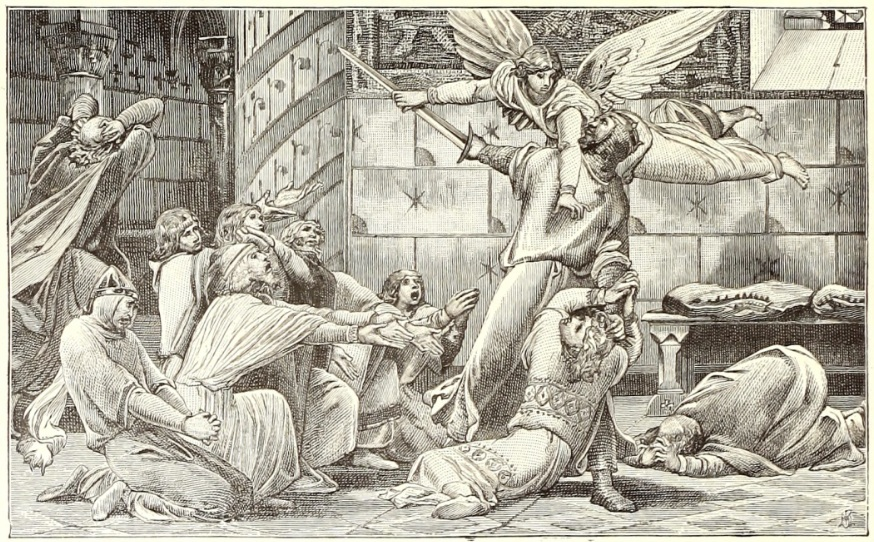
Ogier the Dane's sword aimed at Charlot stopped by angel. —From Léon Gautier ed. Chevalerie (1884), design by Luc-Olivier Merson

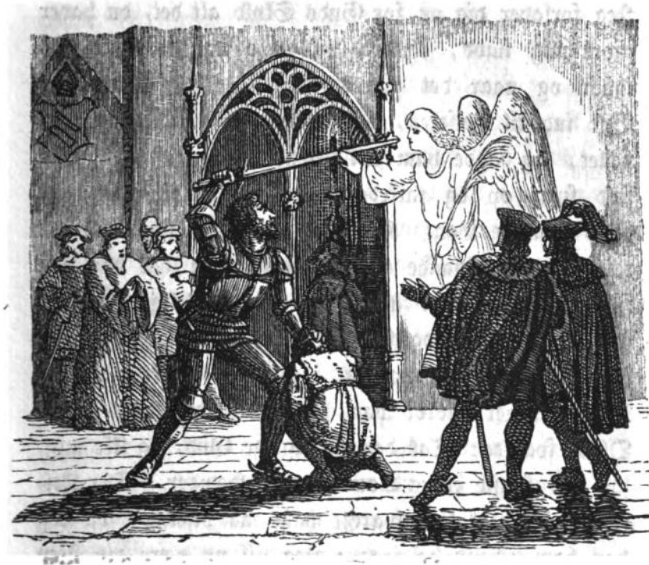
Olger Danske's sword Kortone prevented from harming Karlot —By W. Marstrand in Hanssen (1842) Olger Danskes Krønike

Ogier turned rebel (after Prince Charlot murders his son Bauduin/Baldwinet over chess), and eventually was made prisoner in later branches of Le Chevalerie Ogier. In the ninth branch, he was offered reprieve in exchange for cooperating with fighting a new wave of Saracens, but refused unless he could exact vengeance against Charlot. Ogier was about to strike Courtain upon Charlot, when the archangel Michael interceded, holding the sword by its blade or edge, and staying the execution (cf. fig. right from Gautier's book on chivalry).

The Danish Olger Danskes krønike (1534), adapted from the French prose romance, also records the episode of Olger's sword Kortone being stopped by the angel (see fig. lower right).

=== Renaud de Montauban ===
Ogier tested the sword on a perron (stone block (Note: Cf. next note for commentary on possible meaning of perron besides "boulder block". Hieatt calls it "testing mound", similar to "steel mound" used for sword-testing in the saga version.)) and the sword got chipped (a "half a foot"; Old French: demi pié" (Note: Gautier (1872), p. 169: "Courtain, l'épée d'Ogier.. fut écourtée d'un demi-pied, (V. Renaus de Montauban, éd. Michelant, p. 210, et la Karlamagnus Saga, i, 20, cité par G. Paris [Hist. Poet. Ch.], 370))), giving rise to the name "Cortain (Short)", or so it has been told in the poem Renaud de Montauban (aka Quatre Fils Aymon). (Note: Leon Gautier concedes that in the context of the Chanson de Roland and Renaud here, the perron ought taken to mean a "massive rock construction" (as per Paul Meyer), though probably earlier the word referred to a natural rock formation. He claims moreover that perron was also interchangeably called plancher at an earlier time and was "nothing more than a wooden staircase", though he will refrain from discussing the lore of the steel staircase at the Aix Palace, where the knights tried out their swords (Cf. "steel staircase" used by Ogier to test his sword, mentioned in L. Gautier's reconstructed life of a French noble,Gautier (1884), p. 271, cited below).)

=== Karlamagnús saga I ===
According to the Old Norse version Karlamagnús saga Part I (c. 1240), Karlamagnús (Charlemagne) tested three swords at Aix-la-Chapelle, and the first that only made a notch in the steel mound or block (Note: The original Old Norse phrase is stálhaugr, which Fritzner's dictionary merely defines verbatim as "steel mound" in Norwegian. Hieatt's English translation thus give "steel mound", but the French side-by-side translation gives "mass of steel (masse d'acier)", while Aebisher gave "steel block (bloc d'acier)" In the French source Ogier's sword was tested on a perron (usually considered a stone block) But in Leon Gautier's narrative, Ogier's sword was tested on the "steel staircase" at Aix.) received the name "Kurt" (Cortain), the second that cut a hand-width "Almacia", and the third chopped off a chunk more than a half a foot" (possibly 1/2 foot measure (6 in (150 mm)), or "half length"), earning the name Dyrumdali". (Note: As for 1/2 foot unit measurement, Gehrt (1899) says Durendal "hewed off 1/2 ft." in the saga, and it can be corroborated he meant 1/2 ft., since he uses the same expression for Courtain "striking off 1/2 ft." in the chanson of Renaud, where the original reads "demi pié(pied)" ("drei von Galant.. den dritten, besten, der einen halben Fuss Stahl herunterhaut" (Karlamagnussaga) vs. "drei Helden, zuerst Roland, dann Olivier, dann Ogier. Der letztere.. einen halben Fuss herunterschlug").) (Note: Or "half a leg-length", since ON fótr} could mean "foot" or "leg". Note that although Hieatt's English tr. gives "rent more than half the length of a man's foot" the French side-by-side tr. gives "moitié de la jambe d'un homme (half of human leg)" and Aebischer (1972), p. 131: "la troisième, et il tomba [de la masse] plus de la moitié d'une jambe d'homme" similarly states that a chunk that size "fell".) Thus this Scandinavian account fails to explain how the sword got its name, unlike the French text which reveals that the sword was curtailed when tested. The meaning of "Kurt" in Old Norse would be "courtesy" or "chivalry".

All three swords were received as ransom from a Jew (Note: Not explicit in original text. Hieatt glosses Malakin as "usurer" in index; but the character is assumed to be a Jew (juif) by French scholars.) named "Malakin of Ivin", and all made by Galant of England, namely Wayland the Smith, not the sword-maker named in Chevalerie.

=== Aspremont ===
In the Chanson d'Aspremont, Ogier encounters the main villain of the fist half of the work, Aumon[t]; Ogier with his Cortain (4678) exchanges mighty blows with Aumont who was then the possessor of Durendal. It is stated that the two killed each others horses, (Note: Malcolm Cameron Lyons (1995) citing Brandin, p. 151 v. ~~3641~~ [recté 4690] cf. 8916.) or nearly did so. In the actual text, Cortain strikes the opponent's helm, then cuts off the coif so that "leather and blood" fell, but the blow missed Aumont's face, slicing thorough the saddle (or rather arçon, saddlebow (Note: Note that while Newth's translates Ogier's attack on the arçon as "through his saddle", in the next laisse, Aumont delivers the blow to the arçon is "through the saddle-front" (v. 4712).)) then the sword struck the horse, through the thigh (or rather cuisse, thigh armour) to the shoulder, so that the "stallion falls". (Note: The horse is supposedly Veillantif ("Wideawake") later seized by Roland, and cannot be dying here.) Aumont then insultingly praises Ogier's sword, that if it were only longer it might be deemed equal to his Durendal (4965), and admitting its wielder was a force to be reckoned with. Aumont then praises Ogier for having unhorsed him, and goes on to slice Ogier's horse "through the saddle-front" and on the neck.

=== Post-13th century ===
The sword recurs in the later poems in the decasyllabic (c. 1310) and Alexandrine (c. 1335) versions, and the 15th century prose romance of Ogier, e.g., the scenes of Karaheu (Caraheu) using it in single combat with Ogier. The prose redactor retained the episode of an angel (though he was an anonymous "ung ange de paradis", not specifically St. Michael) who "holds back the stroke of Ogier's sword and took the sword by the point (retint le coup de l'espee d'Ogier et print l'espee par la pointe)" to stop Ogier from killing Charlot with the sword Courtain. Later printed editions have further altered this to stating (in chapter summary) that the angel held back Ogier's arm.

=== Arthurian cycle ===
The Prose Tristan (1230–1235, expanded in 1240) also names Ogier as eventual owner of the sword, though claiming it to have been a relic of the Arthurian knight Tristan (Tristram). Since the sword was originally too long and too heavy, Ogier shortened it and named it Cortaine. (Note: This passage is not included in Curtis tr. (1994)'s English translation.) According to this French narrative, Charlemagne discovered the swords Tristan and Palamedes in an abbey in England; the king gave the Tristan sword to Ogier, and girt Palamedes' sword on himself, which was judged to be a superior sword.

In the La Tavola Ritonda (mid-14th to 15th century) based largely on the Italian translation of the Prose Tristan, Tristan's sword is named Vistamara, considered the best and sharpest in the world. In this version Charlemagne (Carlo Magno) comes to Verzeppe Castle (presumably Leverzep/Louvezerp) in Logres (Note: Bruce Cf. Curtis tr. (1994), p. 313: "Castle Louvezerp" where a tournament takes place.) and finds the statues of five eminent Arthurian knights, each wearing their original sword. Tristan's sword was given to Ogier (Ugieri) who was the only one capable of wielding the heavy sword, but the sword was clipped short upon its first use, and so was named Cortana.

== Purported swords ==
=== St. Faro sword ===
It has been written that Ogier's sword and Benoit's tomb can be witnessed at the monastery of St. Faro at Meaux (Abbaye Saint-Faron de Meaux) in the decasyllabic continuation (c. 1310) to Chevalerie Ogier, and similarly sung in different meters in the Alexandrine version (c. 1335), and the words read: "Whoever goes to Saint - Faron sees Ogier's tomb where the abbot expected to lay him when he was dead. Beside Ogier's tomb is the tomb of Benoît, and Courte the sword with which Ogier smote the wicked heathen at the time when he reigned".

There are various recorded visitors to the tomb throughout the ages including Alexander Neckam in the 12th century. Neckam relates the story that Ogier had become a monk at Mieux (monasterium Meldensi) and his shield and sword were hung there, until Ogier was asked to come out of retirement, horses were tested but could not endure Ogier pressing against its spine, except his own horse (that the monastery put to labor carrying stones), and it neighed in joy recognizing its master. There were twelve soldiers of Charlemagne in presence who were put to shame, and chided Ogier for his rusty weapon, but in the subsequent battle, Ogier's prowess and the recognition of his arms restored the morale of the Frenchmen.

Accounts of the Kortone, are also given in the Danish Olger Danskes krønike (1534), adapted from the French prose romance, and it also notes that the sword could still be viewed at the "cloister of St. Bent (=Benedict)'s order" at Meaux (near Paris) in France. (Note: This is probably the reference to the effigies on the sarcophagi of "Ogier" and "St. Benedict" at Meaux.)

After the monastery of fell to ruin, there was an effort made to recover the sword Cortain which was housed there. The head portion of the stone effigy of Ogier was successfully recovered.

=== English regalia ===
The English monarchy also laid claim to owning "Tristram's sword", (Note: King Johan received "duos enses scilicet ensem Tristrami.. (two swords, namely Tristram's sword..)", Patent Rolls for 1207.) and this according to Roger Sherman Loomis was the "Curtana" ("short") used in the coronation of the British monarch. Loomis also argues that Curtana's origins as Tristram's sword was known to the author of this passage in Prose Tristan, but the tradition was forgotten in England. The English royal Curtana had been once been jagged at its broken tip, and in the Tristan/Tristram romances, the hero's sword broke off, with its tip lodged in Morholt's head.
