= Précieuse =

Fictional sword in The Song of Roland

Précieuse (French for 'precious'; Old French: Preciuse) is the sword of Baligant, the Saracen king in the French epic The Song of Roland.

Baligant allegedly named his sword in response to hearing that Charlemagne's sword had a name. Throughout the epic, there are several contrasts between the two, with Baligant being portrayed as a foolish counterpart to Charlemagne. Baligant felt inferior, and so named his sword with a similar name.
