= Marsilius =

Marsilius may refer to

several medieval scholars:

- Marsilius of Padua
- Marsilius of Inghen
- Marsilius Ficinus

as well as

- King Marsile, a character in the medieval heroic poem, The Song of Roland.
