= Gaydon (chanson de geste) =

Gaydon is a chanson de geste written in about 1230 AD. It recounts the story of Thierry, friend of Charlemagne in the Chanson de Roland, for whom "Gaydon" is another name. The text was first published in Paris in 1862 by François Guessard on the basis of three manuscripts in the Bibliothèque nationale de France (at that time called the Bibliothèque impériale); of these, two date from the thirteenth century, and the third from the fifteenth.
