= Frank Cassenti =

French stage and film director and screenwriter (1945–2023)

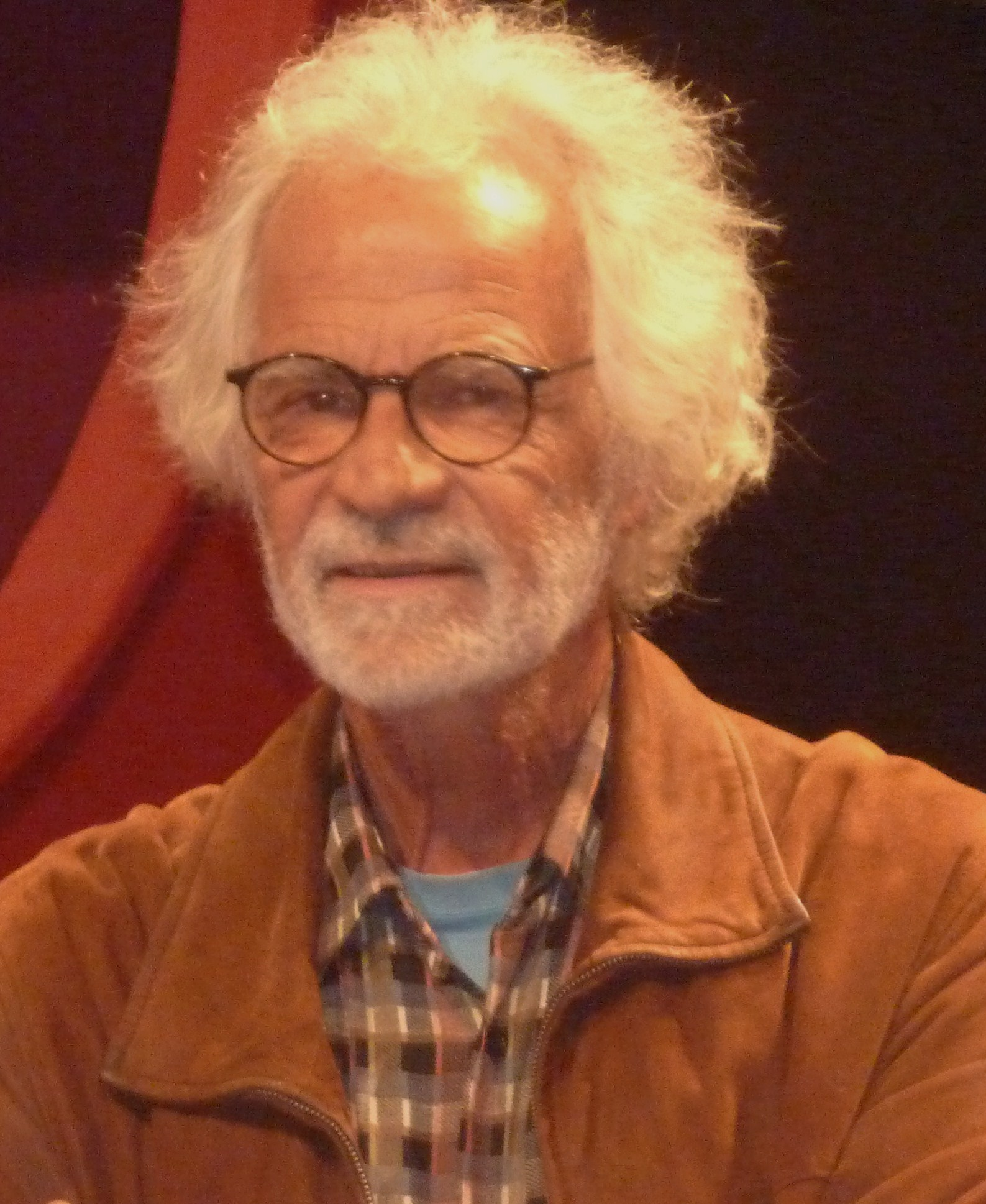
Image of FRANK CASSENTI

Frank Cassenti (6 August 1945 – 22 December 2023) was a French stage and film director and screenwriter. He directed the film The Song of Roland. Cassenti died on 22 December 2023, at the age of 78.
