= Eyvind Fjeld Halvorsen =

Norwegian philologist

Eyvind Fjeld Halvorsen (4 May 1922 – 19 March 2013) was a Norwegian philologist.

He was born in Ringerike. He was hired as a docent at the University of Oslo in 1954, took the dr.philos. degree in 1959 on the thesis The Norse Version of the Chanson de Roland (about The Song of Roland) and served as a professor at the University of Oslo from 1962 to 1992. He served as dean from 1964 to 1970. He is a member of the Norwegian Academy of Science and Letters. He was also involved as chairman and vice chairman of Norsk språknemnd 1958 to 1972 and its successor body the Norwegian Language Council from 1972 to 1988.

He died in March 2013 in Kolsås.
