= Pinabel =

Vassal of Charlemagne

Pinabel, also known as Pinabello, is one of Charlemagne's vassals in The Song of Roland, Orlando furioso, and other works within the corpus of writings known as the Matter of France. Pinabel is the nephew and friend of the knight Ganelon. Different works give different accounts of Pinabel; in Orlando furioso, Pinabel tricks the female knight Bradamante into stepping off a cliff, but she narrowly escapes death. She later kills Pinabel for his treachery. In the Old French chanson de geste The Song of Roland, Pinabel represents his friend Ganelon, who has been charged with treason, in a trial by combat. In the course of this duel, Pinabel is killed by Thierry, another of Charlemagne's knights.
