= Curtana =

Sword, British crown jewel

Curtana, also known as the Sword of Mercy, is a ceremonial sword used at the coronation of British kings and queens. One of the Crown Jewels of the United Kingdom, its end is blunt and squared to symbolise mercy.

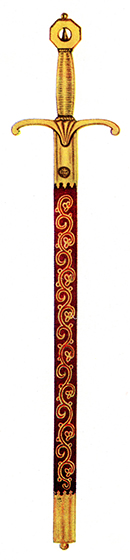
Curtana with scabbard

== Description ==
The sword measures 96.5 cm (38 in) long and 19 cm (7 1/2 in) wide at the handle. About 2.5 cm (1 in) of the steel blade's tip is missing. The blade features a decorative "running wolf" mark which originated in the town of Passau, Lower Bavaria, Germany. It has a gilt-iron hilt, a wooden grip bound in wire, and a leather sheath bound in crimson velvet with gold embroidery. The sheath has been remade several times since the 17th century, and the current one was made in 1937.

The Curtana has a squared tip. It is used in the procession alongside two other pointed swords. The Curtana once had a jagged edge like a naturally broken tip, but this was squared off at some time. (Note: Compare Edward Walker's sketch for the sketch of the original sword used to make the replica for Charles II, versus the Francis Sandford's engraving.) At one time, the other two could be distinguished by their points: the sharply-pointed Sword of Temporal Justice, and the more obtuse Sword of Spiritual Justice. (Note: Legg credits H.A. Wilson for the intelligence on "obtuse" angle. The difference in the sharpness of the angle at the tip is clearly distinguished in the engravings printed by Francis Sandford. For comparison, see current photographs of the unsheathes swords.)

== History ==
There are several swords answering to this description. The original is thought to be the same as the unnamed regalia sword purported to be the sword of Tristan, although he may be a fictional character contrived by a bard. The original may also be the sword of Edward the Confessor, although this provenance is debated. The later copy of Curtana was made in the 17th century.

=== Angevin dynasty ===
An early 20th-century likeness of Curtana, with ragged tip after a 1661 catalogue by Sir Edward Walker, Garter King of Arms.

The name Curtana or Curtein (from the Latin Curtus, meaning short) appears on record for the first time in accounts of the coronation of Queen Eleanor of Provence in 1236 when Henry III of England married the queen. (Note: The title "Coron. Hen. III" invoked in the OED is misleading, but Henry III was in the advent of "the Wash" was crowned hastily in 1216 at age nine, and a second coronation was performed for him in 1220.) It occurs as "Curtana" in the "Red Book of the Exchequer" as one of the three swords used in the coronation services; and called "Curtein" in the Chronicle of 13th-century monk Matthew Paris, (Note: Comite Cestriae Gladium Sancti Edwardi, qui Curtein dicitur ante regum bajulante translated as "the Earl of Chester carried the Sword of Saint Edward which was called curtana before the King, as a sign that he was the Earl of the Palace", etc.) in which he identifies it with the "Sword of Edward the Confessor". (Note: Although Matthew Paris only says "S. Edward", it is clear the Norman-heritaged Edward the Confessor is meant, from a political perspective. Henry III commissioned Matthew Paris to write a Vita of Edward Confessor.)

==== St. Edward's sword ====
The notion of Curtana being St. Edward's sword was spurious. There had been objects up to then purported to be St. Edward the Confessor's regalia, but these did not include any sword. The chalice and paten of St. Edward are also regalia mentioned for the first time on this occasion at Eleanor's coronation. There were political reasons why the provenance of Edward the Confessor needed to be promoted, as his mother was Norman, and he dwelled for some years in Normandy.

==== Ogier's sword ====
The name of Curtana (Anglo-Norman: Curtein) was likely taken from the named sword Cortain from literature in the Carolingian cycle, as the Oxford English Dictionary (1893) had suggested, (Note: Unfortunately the OED misidentifies Ogier's sword as Roland's (the mistake does not originate from Gaston Paris who is cited), and cites Charlemagne's saga which postdate the 1236 event.) as have other commentators. (Note: Arthur Taylor (1820), also citing a late source, i.e., the Italian form "Curtana" (Uggiero's sword) from a late Morgante, (1483). He does indicates in footnote that the hero was otherwise called Ogier and appeared in French literature.) A plausible contemporaneous source that Matthew Paris and his circles may have read from the cycle was Chevalerie Ogier (c. 1192–1200), and they may have been inspired to borrow Ogier's sword-name because Ogier, in the later part of the poem adventures in England and marries the daughter of the English king Angart.

==== Tristram's sword ====
This Curtana sword may have been the same one as the so-called "Tristram's sword", kept as part of the regalia according to earlier Angevin dynasty records. (Note: Other supposed Arthurian relics were kept during this (late 12 to early 13c.) period. Also Henry II (John's father) had commissioned the dig at King Arthur's tomb at Gastonbury Abbey, turning up a lead cross with inscriptions, likely faked.) An inventory for two swords, "namely Tristan's sword (scilicet ensem Tristrami)" and one other, is recorded in the patent roll for the year 1207, where King John issued a receipt for them. (Note: "duos enses scilicet ensem et Tristrami alium ensem de eodem regali "two swords, namely, the sword of Tristan, and another sword of the same royal" conveyed from the Tower of London and received by John at Clarendon Palace.) (Note: While Hardy's edition of the Patent Rolls of London Tower is the cited primary source in each case, it is printed as is from the manuscript (using scribal abbreviation), so that Hope which expands the text into longhand and blockquotes at length is useful, as are the English renderings of the Latin given by Jones and by Ditmas.) Any credible relic claiming to be "Tristram's sword" would have to be broken-tipped, since the Tristan of romance had his sword damaged in combat with Morholt, with the tip lodged in the enemy's skull. Therefore, according to Roger Sherman Loomis, the inference can be made with "little doubt" that this was in fact the sword later called Curtana. A plausible scenario suggested by Martin Aurell is that Henry II may have symbolically girt "Tristram's sword" onto his son John in 1177 (or 1185) when he conferred him knighthood and appanage over Cornwall and Ireland― these being the native homelands of the sword-owner Tristan and sword-victim Morholt respectively.

Although Tristan's sword had no name in early Tristan and Iseult romances, in the Prose Tristan ("begun 1230–1235, expanded and reworked after 1240" (Note: Precise dating is crucial in comparison with the coronation event of 1236. The prologue portion is attributed to Luce, the bulk of the expansion to Helie de Boron, both possibly pseudonymous or pseudepigraphic Some versions apparently ascribe authorship to "Rusticien de Pise" (Rustichello da Pisa) who translated it from a book supplied by King Edward of England.)) Tristan's broken sword (Note: The sword was broken in combat against Morholt, in the early romance (as aforementioned), and so too in the prose: the prose version for example retains the scene where Isolde matches the broken piece taken from her uncle Morholt's head against Tristan's sword which is notched with a piece missing.) was taken by Charlemagne who came to England, and given to his paladin Ogier the Dane, who further shortened it, and the name "Cortain". (Note: This ending not included in Curtis tr. (1994)'s English translation.) (Note: However, the same epilogue occurs in the Italian Tavola Ritionda, which is a rendition of the prose Tristan.) This has been regarded as corroborative evidence by Loomis for his theory. Loomis deduced that the prose romancer of Tristan must have gained knowledge of the English regalia sword Curtana pretending to be Tristan's sword, even though the English themselves during the reign of Henry III had "forgotten" about this connection. E. M. R. Ditmas had called Loomis's theory "attractive", though she dissented on some points. (Note: Ditmas refuted the possibility that the English could be so forgetful of their regal sword's connection to Tristam, since not only was Ogier's sword Courtain well-known at the time (supra., § Ogier's sword), but because "Ogier's sword, according to tradition, had belonged originally to Tristram"; but this is anachronistic, since the earliest attestation of that "tradition" is the prose Tristan, and as another commentator (Emma Mason) explains, the work dates from the mid-13th century (post 1236), so that the rational chronology was that the prose "author knew, or had heard of Henry III's Curtana", just as Loomis had it, not the other way around.)

==== Dating the sword ====
The original sword's dating cannot be fixed, and opinions vary among commentators on since when it may have existed. According to Matthew Paris, the sword was known as that of Edward the Confessor (reigned 1042–1066). Some have taken this at face value, for example, James Planché. Others discount the possibility (E. M. R. Ditmas), and it may have resulted from confusion: there certainly had been St. Edward's effects which were removed from the grave and preserved as regalia, but this did not include a sword. (Note: St. Edward's grave was opened in 1102 and his crown, ring, scepter, and sandals were removed and entrusted to Westminster Abbey.)

As aforementioned, Aurell suggested that "Tristan's sword" may have been provided by Henry II for his son John Lackland, on the occasion investing John with lordship over Cornwall and Ireland in 1177, (or perhaps the investiture happened in 1185, just before John left for Ireland on expedition). Matthew Strickland thought it was "probably" used in the two coronations of Henry the Young King, in 1154 and 1170. It is known that at Richard I's coronation (1189) "three royal swords.. from the king's treasury", with scabbards covered in gold, were carried by three earls in the procession. (Note: Roger of Hoveden's chronicle, referring to "tres gladios Regios (three royal swords)", etc. Hoveden is "somewhat fuller" and "near contemporaneous" compared to other accounts. The "earliest detailed account" on English coronation.(Legg (1901), p. 46))

=== Earl of Chester ===
The tradition for the Earl of Chester to carry the sword at the monarch's coronation was asserted during the 1236 ceremony by the 7th Earl, i.e., John of Scotland, Earl of Huntingdon, who asserted the right to carry two swords because he held offices of two earldoms, as documented in the Red Book of the Exchequer. This caused immediate friction with other earls, but the king interceded, so it was decided that Chester, Warwick, and Lincoln would carry a sword each. It is not certain how far back this privilege dates, but perhaps it started with Ranulf de Blondeville, 6th Earl of Chester. It has been speculated that this Ranulf may have carried Curtana at Richard Lionheart's second coronation in 1194. (Note: As aforementioned, at Richard I's first coronation in 1189, it is at least known that three ceremonial swords were used.)

Until the 14th century, it remained the job of the Earl of Chester to carry the sword during the coronation ceremony. Today, another high-ranking peer of the realm is chosen by the monarch for this privilege. When not in use, the sword is on display with the other Crown Jewels in the Jewel House at the Tower of London.

=== Sword of Mercy ===
The meaning attributed to Curtana and the other two British coronation swords shifted over time. During Henry IV (Note: Henry IV as Earl of Derby also acted one to carry the sword.) meanings were assigned to the swords of the coronation ceremony, but initially, Curtana was said to signify the "Sword of Justice". (Note: It was employed with the "Sword of the Church (lespee de leglise)", quoted from the Chroniques of Jehan de Waurin, given by Legg.) Eventually, however, Curtana's blunt edge was taken to represent mercy, and it thus came to be known as the Sword of Mercy, as it is known today. Curtana's designation as the "Sword of Mercie" goes at least as far back as Henry VI's coronation. (Note: Legg on p. xxv, note 2, quotes an account of Henry VI's coronation from Ms. Harg. 497, fol. 30, but there it is not clarified if Curtana is the Sword of Mercy. Legg on p. 193 says the meanings are given on fol. 29 of the same manuscript, but does not copy out the text.)

=== 17th-century reproduction of Curtana ===
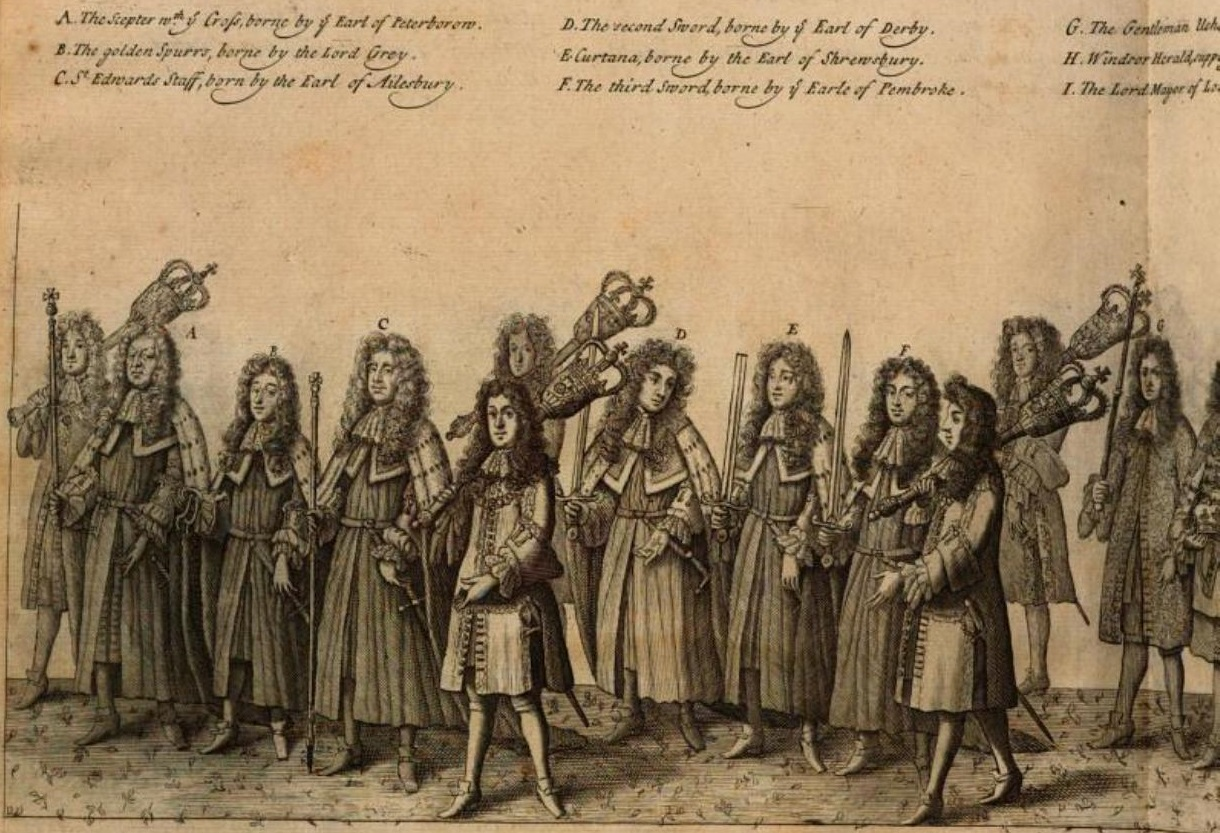
Procession in the 1685 coronation of James II, including blunt Curtana sword (E) borne by the Earl of Shrewsbury. —Engraving from Sandford (1687), History of the Coronation of James II

The "current" Curtana was made between 1610 and 1620, likely by Robert South, a member of the Worshipful Company of Cutlers, and was supplied for Charles I's coronation in 1626, whereafter it joined the coronation regalia kept at Westminster Abbey. For almost 200 years until then, a new sword had been usually made for each coronation. (Note: Around the time of Richard II the sword was a permanent fixture of the regalia.) Its blade was created in the 1580s by Italian bladesmiths Andrea Ferrara and his brother Giandonato/Zandonà, and imported into England from Italy. (Note: It had been noticed (at least by 1950) that the Curtana's blade bore an engraved wolf mark, as did the Sword of Temporal Justice, and on the Sword of Spiritual Justice could be made out a half-effaced inscription that possibly read "Andrea Ferrara".) Together with two Swords of Justice and the Coronation Spoon, it is one of the few pieces of the Crown Jewels to have survived the English Civil War intact, having been sold to Roger Humphreys for £5 in 1649. It is not clear if the swords were used by Charles II, but they have been used continuously since the Coronation of James II and VII and Mary in 1685 (cf. fig. right).
