= Blancandrin =

Instigator of the pagan plot against Roland and Charlemagne in The Song of Roland

In The Song of Roland, Blancandrin is the instigator of the pagan plot against Roland and Charlemagne. He first appears in the final line of the second stanza of the poem as the only pagan who speaks to give King Marsile counsel, and is then described as the wisest of the pagans and a good and worthy knight, which are uncommon sentiments when describing the 'Saracens' throughout the poem. He suggests that Marsile accept the Christian faith and become a vassal of Charlemagne, as well as offering many gifts and the nobles' sons as hostages for execution if the Frank leaves Spain for Aix. He then acts as messenger to Charlemagne.

Blancandrin escorts Ganelon to Marsile (stanzas 28–32) and acts as go-between for the two men (35 and 38). He is not subsequently mentioned.
