= Martin Aurell =

Spanish-French historian and academic (1958–2025)

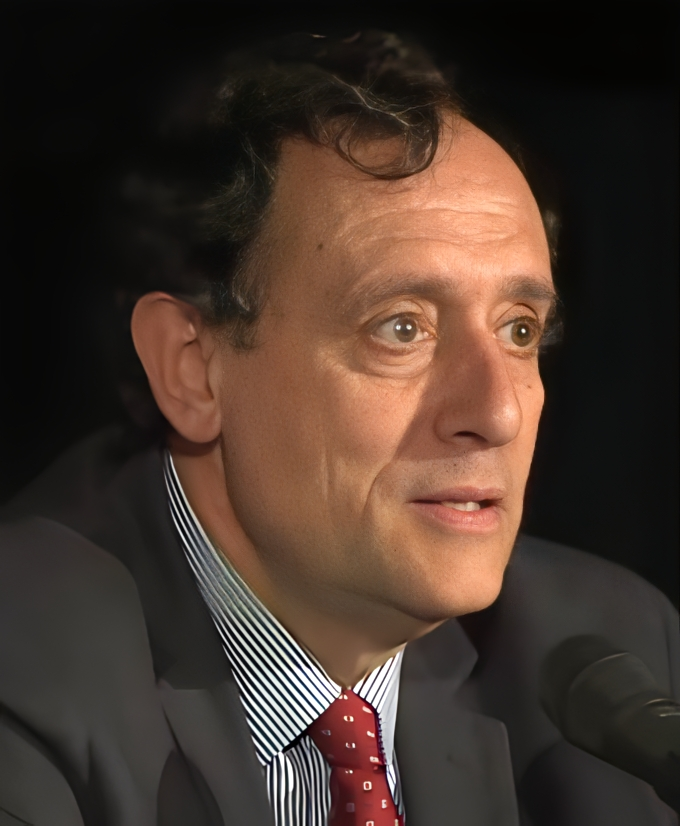
- Aurell in 2020
- Born: Martin Aurell Cardona; 23 February 1958; Barcelona, Spain
- Died: 8 February 2025 (aged 66); Nantes, France
- Education: École pratique des hautes études University of Provence (DND)
- Occupation(s): Historian, academic

Martin Aurell Cardona (23 February 1958 – 8 February 2025) was a Spanish-French historian and academic. He specialised in the House of Plantagenet.

== Life and career ==
Born in Barcelona on 23 February 1958, Aurell was the eldest of four children. His brother, Jaume Aurell, was also a medieval historian. He earned his Diplôme nationale de doctorate from the University of Provence in 1994, having also studied history and philology at the École pratique des hautes études.

Aurell began his career as an assistant professor in Nice in 1986. He was a lecturer at Paris-Sorbonne University and the University of Rouen Normandy before starting his longtime tenure at the University of Poitiers. In 1999, he became a member of the Institute for Advanced Study in Princeton, New Jersey and was a member of the Institut Universitaire de France from 2002 to 2012. From 2015 to 2022, he was director of the Centre d'études supérieures de civilisation médiévale. From 2023 until his death, he was president of the Centre Vendéen de Recherches Historiques. Throughout his career, he primarily studied the 10th through 13th Centuries. He notably wrote about detractors from the Crusades. His 2024 book Aliénor d'Aquitaine, souveraine femme received the Prix de la biographie from the newspaper Le Point.

Martin Aurell died suddenly from a pulmonary embolism in Nantes, on 8 February 2025, at the age of 66. Several tributes were made in his honor in the academic sphere.

== Works ==
=== Books ===
- Une Famille de la noblesse provençale au Moyen Âge, les Porcelet (1986)
- La Vielle et l'épée : troubadours et politique en Provence au XIIIe siècle (1989)
- L'État et l'aristocratie en Catalogne et en Provence (IXe – XIVe siècles) (1994)
- Les noces du comte : mariage et pouvoir en Catalogne (785-1213) (1995)
- La noblesse en Occident (Ve – XVe siècles) (1996)
- Les actes de la famille Porcelet d'Arles : 972-1320 (2001)
- L'empire des Plantagenêt, 1154-1224 (2002)
- La Provence au Moyen Âge (2005)
- La légende du roi Arthur, 550-1250 (2007)
- Le chevalier lettré : savoir et conduite de l'aristocratie aux XIIe et XIIIe siècles (2011)
- Des Chrétiens contre les croisades (XIIe – XIIIe siècle) (2013)
- Aliénor d'Aquitaine (2020)
- Excalibur, Durendal, Joyeuse : la force de l'épée (2021)
- Les chevaliers de la Table ronde: romans arthuriens (2022)
- Dix idées reçues sur le Moyen Âge (2023)
- Aliénor d'Aquitaine : souveraine femme (2024)

=== CD ===
- Aliénor d’Aquitaine. Une biographie expliquée (2019)

=== Video ===
- Regna et femina : pour une histoire d’Aliénor d’Aquitaine (1999)
