= Baligant =

Character in The Song of Roland

In The Song of Roland, Baligant is the Emir of Babylon (i.e., Cairo, not the Mesopotamian Babylon), who brings an immense army to aid his vassal King Marsile (a.k.a. "Marsillion") in defending Zaragoza (sometimes spelled "Saragossa") from Charlemagne but is killed in the ensuing battle. He is sometimes described as a man from ancient times and is often seen as the parallel of Charlemagne, both being old, handsome and skillful with a sword. One might say they were equals, except that Charlemagne had the help of Saint Gabriel. The name Baligant is likely a folk-etymological rendering of Arabic or Turkish antroponymy.

Baligant's banner is a dragon, and he also rides into battle with the banners of Tervagant and Apollo. These standards are guarded, it seems, by ten men of Canileu. In the midst of the battle, he cries out to these deities to succour him against Charles.

Baligant and Charles meet on the field as the day of battle turns to evening. They unhorse one another and rise with swords drawn to battle again, each sending blow after mighty blow upon the other's shield. In the midst of their combat each advises the other to repent: Baligant requests Charles' servitude, while Charles tries to convert the admiral to Christianity. Baligant then strikes Charles' helm, exposing his skull. Charles, however, hearing the voice of St. Gabriel, finds the strength to strike back, dealing Baligant a deathblow to the helm.

It has been suggested that the tale of the battle between Baligant and Charlemagne was inspired by tales of returning Norman mercenaries about the battle of Manzikert, reflecting the new danger arising in the East.

He carried a sword named Précieuse.
