= King Marsile =

Character in The Song of Roland

Marsile (variously spelled Marsilie, Marsilius, Marsilio, Marsilion, Marsiglio, Marcilie, Marsille, Marsilies, Marsilun, or Marsiluns) is a character in the French heroic poem The Song of Roland. He is the Muslim king of Arabs, conquering Saracens and of Zaragoza. He first appears in Stanza 1, asking his barons for counsel because he is losing the war against Charlemagne. He readily accepts Blancandrin's proposal of surrender (Stanzas 1–6), and agrees to Ganelon's scheme after testing his worth and persuasion from his wife Bramimonde and his nobility (32–52). He takes part in the Battle of Roncevaux Pass, kills Bevon, Lord of Beaune and Dijon, Yvoire, Yvon and Gerald of Roussillon, before Roland cuts off Marsile's right hand and the head of his son, Jurfaleu the Blond, and Marsile is forced to flee (142) to Zaragoza (187). Bound to his bed with his injuries, he summons help from Baligant (189), places Spain in Baligant's care (202), and later dies of his wounds, his army having been destroyed. According to the Historia Caroli Magni, Charlemagne had him hanged on the same tree where Judas hanged himself.

There is no historical evidence for King Marsile's existence. He is possibly only a petty king but said to be the last of the Arabs in Al Andalus to make a stand against the Franks. The battle of Roncevaux appears in very few historical records.
