= Ganelon =

Fictional character in the Matter of France

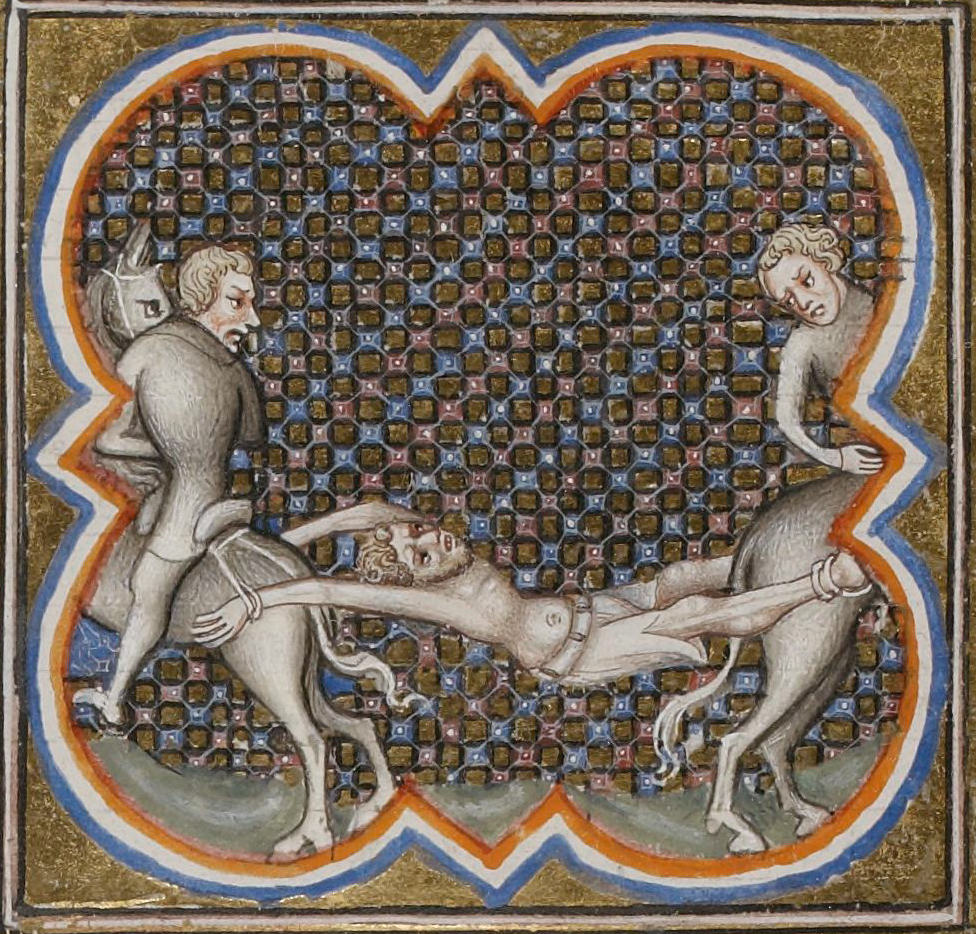
The torture of Ganelon. Grandes Chroniques de France, 14th century.

Ganelon (US: /ˌɡænəˈloʊn/, French: [ɡan(ə)lɔ̃]) is the fictional knight who betrayed Charlemagne's army to the Saracens in the 11th century Matter of France, leading to the 778 Battle of Roncevaux Pass. He is based upon the historical Wenilo, the archbishop of Sens who betrayed King Charles the Bald in 858, though it has been suggested that his name is derived from the Italian word inganno, meaning fraud or deception.

== Appearances ==
Ganelon's most famous appearance is in The Song of Roland, where he is represented as a well-respected Frankish baron, Roland's own stepfather and Charlemagne's brother-in-law. According to this Old French chanson de geste Ganelon was married to Charlemagne's sister and had a son with her. Ganelon resents his stepson's boastfulness, great popularity among the Franks and success on the battlefield. When Roland nominates him for a dangerous mission as messenger to the Saracens, Ganelon is deeply offended and vows vengeance.

This revenge takes the form of treachery, as Ganelon plots the ambush at Roncesvals with Blancandrin. At the end, justice is served when Ganelon's comrade Pinabel is defeated in a trial by combat, showing that Ganelon is a traitor in the eyes of God. Ganelon is torn limb from limb by four fiery horses.

In Canto XXXII of the Book of Inferno in Dante's The Divine Comedy, Ganelon (Ganellone) has been banished to Cocytus in the depths of hell as punishment for his betrayal to his own country in the second round of the ninth circle called Antenora.

Ganelon (Italian: Gano; commonly: Gano di Pontieri, i.e. "Ganelon of Ponthieu" or Gano di Maganza, i.e. "Ganelon of Mainz") also appears in Italian Renaissance epic poem romances dealing with Charlemagne, Roland (Italian: Orlando) and Renaud de Montauban (Italian: Renaldo or Rinaldo), such as Matteo Maria Boiardo's Orlando Innamorato and Luigi Pulci's Morgante. The treachery and dishonesty of the House of Maganza became proverbial in Italy, as for example in this inscription of 1472 on the wall of a castle in Canzo: Non te fidare de femina nesuna / che sono tute dela caxa de Maganza (Don't trust any woman, / for they're all from House of Mainz). Lope de Vega makes an echo of this using the word "magancesa" ('from Maganza') as a synonymous of treacherous woman in his work La bella malmaridada, v. 1450.

In Don Quixote, Cervantes wrote, "To have a bout of kicking at that traitor of a Ganelon, he [Don Quixote] would have given his housekeeper, and his niece into the bargain."

He is also mentioned in Chaucer's Canterbury Tales, both in "The Shipman's Tale", where his gruesome fate is a byword (193-94: "... God take on me vengeance/ as foul as evere hadde Genylon of France") and in "The Nun's Priest's Tale" (225: "O false assassin, lurking in thy den! O new Iscariot, new Ganelon!").

== See also ==
- The Right Pleasant and Goodly Historie of the Foure Sonnes of Aymon
