= Song of Roland =

11th-century French epic poem

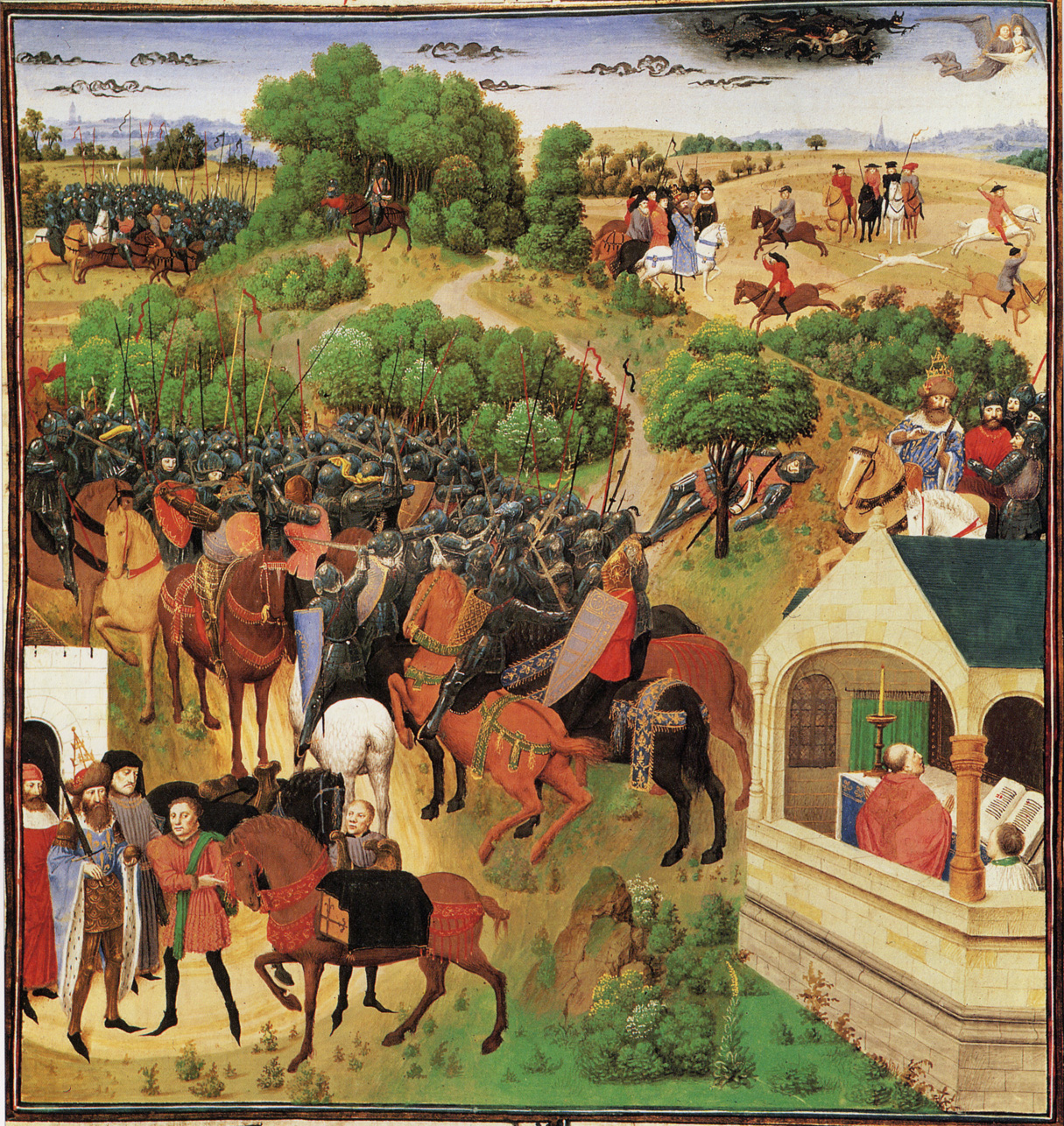
The eight phases of the Song of Roland in one picture; illustration by Simon Marmion from an illuminated manuscript of the Grandes Chroniques de France (15th century), currently preserved in the Hermitage Museum in Saint Petersburg, Russia

The Song of Roland (French: La Chanson de Roland) is an 11th-century chanson de geste based on the deeds of the Frankish military leader Roland at the Battle of Roncevaux Pass in AD 778, during the reign of Charlemagne. It is the oldest surviving major work of French literature. It exists in various manuscript versions, which testify to its enormous and enduring popularity in Medieval and Renaissance literature from the 12th to the 16th centuries.

It is an epic poem written in Old French and is the first example of the chanson de geste, a literary form that flourished between the 11th and 16th centuries in Medieval Europe and celebrated legendary deeds. An early version was composed around 1040, with additions and alterations made up to about 1115. The final poem contains about 4,000 lines.

== Manuscripts and dating ==
Bodleian Library, MS Digby 23, Part 2

Although set in the Carolingian era, the Song of Roland was written centuries later. There is a single extant manuscript of the Song of Roland. It is held at the Bodleian Library at the University of Oxford. It dates between 1129 and 1165 and was written in Anglo-Norman. There are eight additional manuscripts and three fragments of other poems on the subject of Roland.

Scholars estimate that the poem was written between approximately 1040 and 1115 — possibly by a poet named Turold (Turoldus in the manuscript itself) — and that most of the alterations were completed by about 1098. Some favor the earlier dating, which allows that the narrative was inspired by the Castilian campaigns of the 1030s and that the poem was established early enough to be a major influence in the First Crusade (1096–1099). Others favor a later dating based on brief passages which are interpreted as alluding to events of the First Crusade.

Relevant to the question of dating the poem, the term d'oltre mer (or l'oltremarin) occurs three times in the text in reference to named Muslims who came to fight in Spain and France. The Old French oltre mer (oversea, modern French outremer) was commonly used during and after the First Crusade to refer to the Latin Levant, which supports a date of composition after the Crusade. Those favoring an earlier dating argue that the term is used generically to refer to "a Muslim land." It is possible that the bulk of the poem dates from before the Crusades, with a few additions from the time of the First Crusade.

After two manuscripts were found in 1832 and 1835 and published in 1837, the Song of Roland became recognized as France's national epic.

== Critical opinions ==
=== Oral performance compared to manuscript versions ===
Scholarly consensus has long accepted that the Song of Roland was at first performed orally in many different versions with varying material and episodes, which were fixed and harmonized in the textual form.

Early 19th century editors of the Song of Roland, informed in part by patriotic desires to elevate a distinctly French epic, could thus overstate the textual cohesiveness of the Roland tradition as they presented it to the public. Andrew Taylor notes, "[T]he Roland song was, if not invented, at the very least constructed. By supplying it with an appropriate epic title, isolating it from its original codicological context, and providing a general history of minstrel performance in which its pure origin could be located, the early editors presented a 4,002 line poem as sung French epic".

=== AOI ===
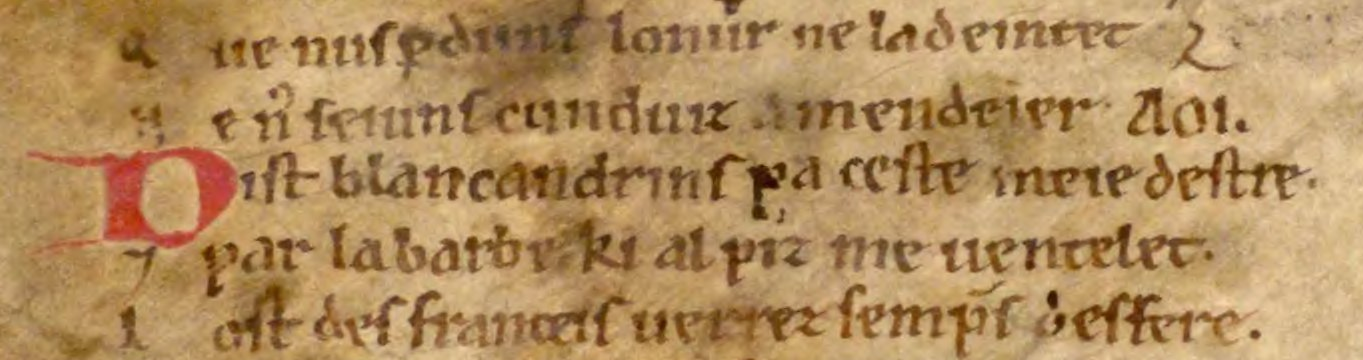
Detail of manuscript showing "AOI" at the end of the second line

Certain lines of the Oxford manuscript end with the letters "AOI". The meaning of this word or annotation is unclear. Many scholars have hypothesized that the marking may have played a role in public performances of the text, such as indicating a place where a jongleur would change the tempo. Contrarily, Nathan Love believes that "AOI" marks locations where the scribe or copyist is signaling that he has deviated from the primary manuscript: ergo, the mark indicates the source is a non-performance manuscript.

== Plot ==
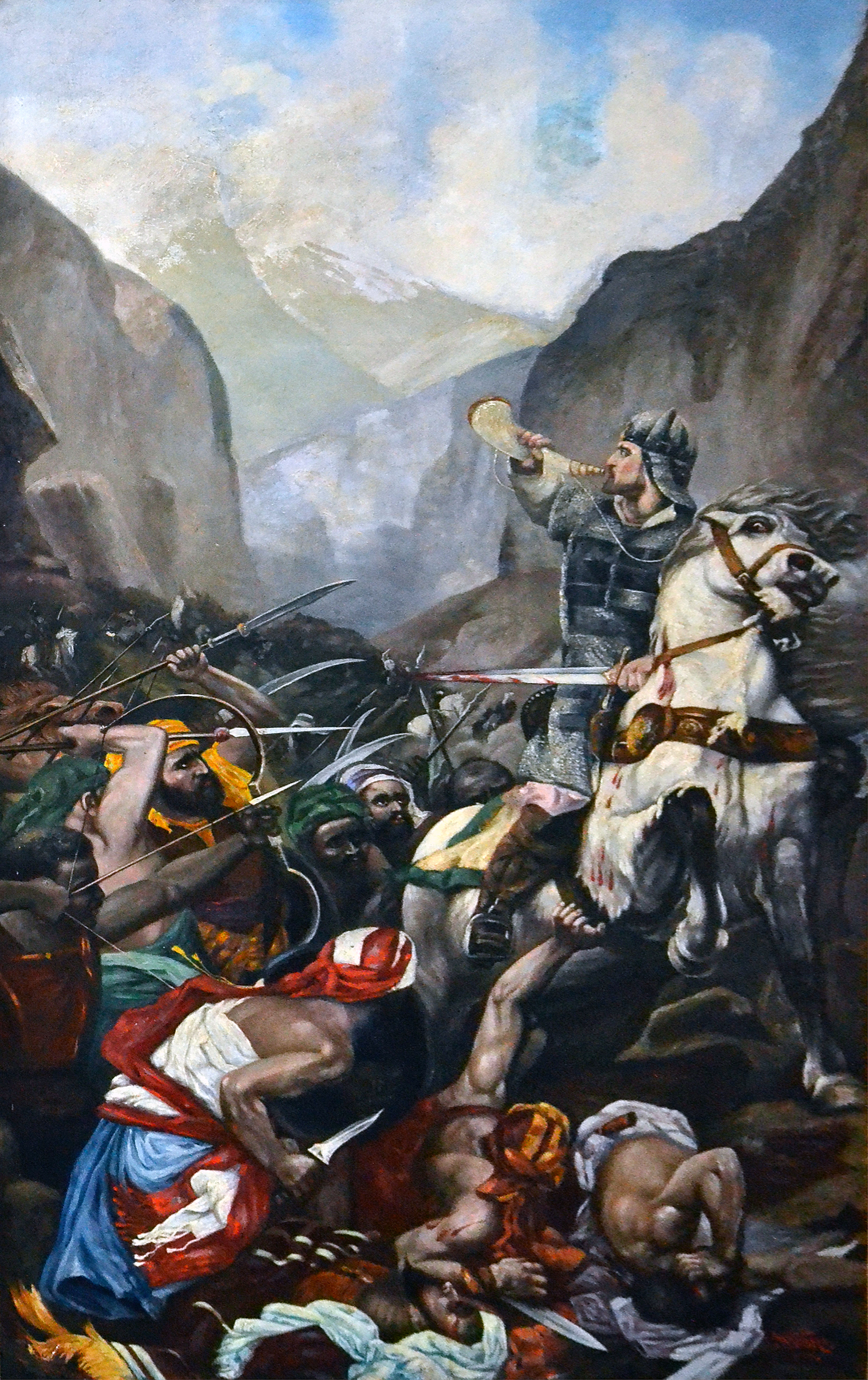
Roland blows his olifant (ivory hunting horn) to summon help holding his sword Durendal while mounted on his horse Veillantif with Roland's Breach in the background, in the midst of the Battle of Roncevaux.

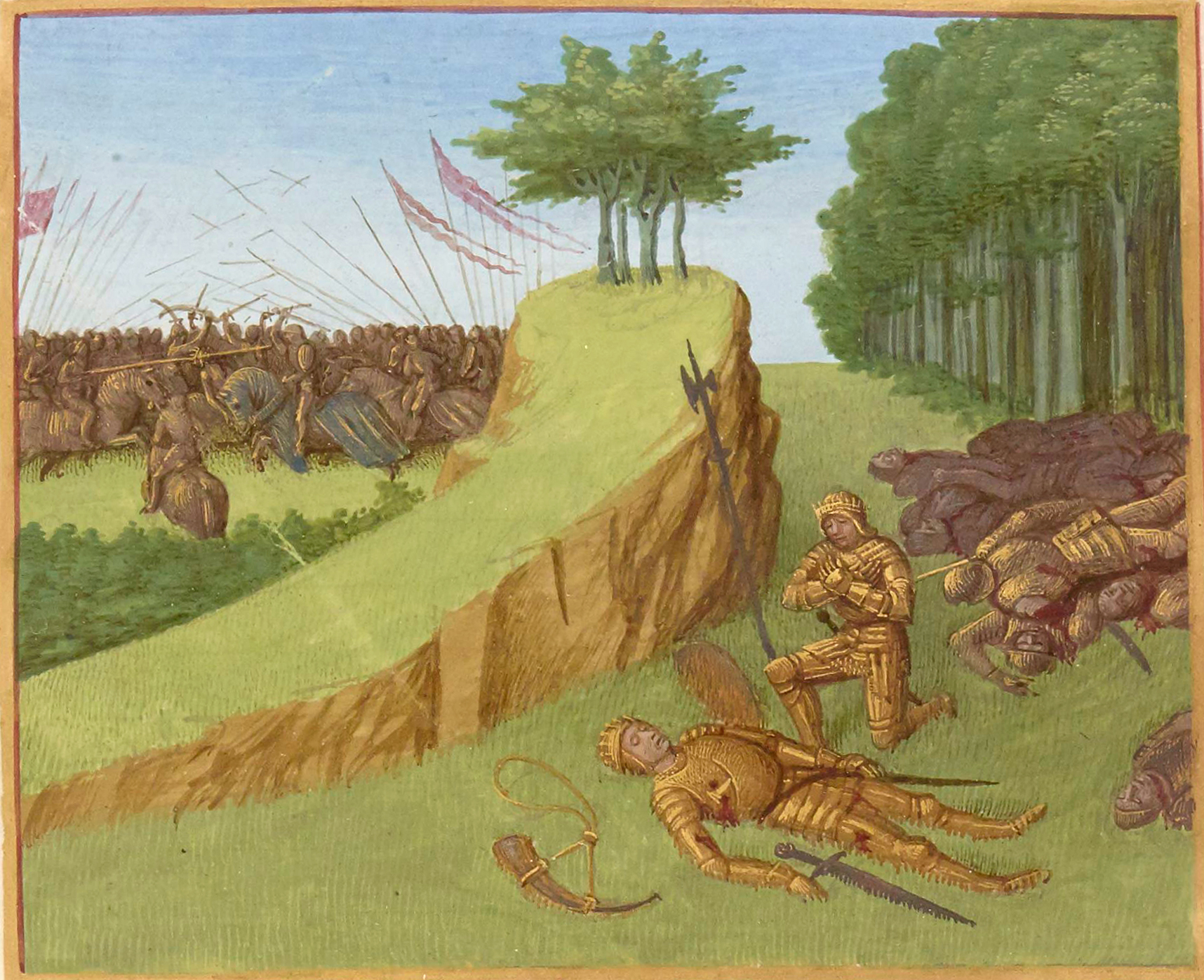
The death of Roland at the Battle of Roncevaux, illuminated c. 1455–1460 by Jean Fouquet

The Song of Roland's account of the Battle of Roncesvalles is not supported by history. According to Einhard's Vita Karoli Magni from the late eighth century, the attackers were Basques seeking revenge against Charlemagne's army for the looting of Pamplona. The following is the depiction in the poem itself, not a historical account.

Charlemagne's army is fighting the Arab Muslims in Spain. They have campaigned for seven years, and the last city standing is Zaragoza, held by King Marsile, who is pictured not as a Muslim, but a follower of Mahumet and Apollin. Threatened by the might of Charlemagne's Franks, Marsile seeks advice from his wise man, Blancandrin, who counsels him to conciliate the Emperor, offering to surrender and giving hostages. Accordingly, Marsile sends out messengers to Charlemagne, promising treasure and Marsile's conversion to Christianity if the Franks will go back to Francia.

Charlemagne and his men, tired of fighting, accept his peace offer and select a messenger to Marsile's court. The protagonist, Roland, Charlemagne's nephew, nominates his stepfather, Ganelon, as messenger. Ganelon, who fears being murdered by the enemy and accuses Roland of intending this, takes revenge by informing the Saracens of a way to ambush the rear guard of Charlemagne's army, led by Roland, as the Franks re-enter Francia through the mountain passes.

As Ganelon predicted, Roland leads the rear guard, with the wise and moderate Oliver and the fierce Archbishop Turpin. The Muslims ambush them at Roncesvalles and the Christians are overwhelmed. Oliver pleads with Roland to blow his horn to call for help, but Roland tells him that blowing his horn in the middle of the battle would be an act of cowardice. If Roland continues to refuse, Oliver will not let Roland see his sister again whom Roland loves the most. However, Archbishop Turpin intervenes and tells them that the battle will be fatal for all of them and so instructs Roland to blow his horn oliphant (an elephant tusk hunting horn) to call for help from the Frankish army. The emperor hears the call en route to Francia. Charlemagne and his noblemen gallop back even though Count Ganelon tries to trick them.

Roland's Franks fight well, but are outnumbered, until almost all his men are dead and he knows that Charlemagne's army can no longer save them. Despite this, he blows his oliphant to summon revenge, blowing so hard that his temples start to bleed. After a few more fights, Roland succumbs to his wounds and dies a martyr's death. Angels lift his soul to Paradise.

When Charlemagne and his men reach the battlefield, they find the slaughtered bodies of Roland and his men. They pursue the Muslims into the river Ebro, where the Muslims drown. Meanwhile, Baligant, the powerful emir of Babylon, has arrived in Spain to help Marsile. His army encounters that of Charlemagne at Roncesvalles, where the Christians are burying and mourning their dead. The Franks fight valiantly. When Charlemagne kills Baligant, the Muslim army scatters and flees, leaving the Franks to conquer Zaragoza. With Marsile's wife Bramimonde, Queen of Zaragoza, Charlemagne and his men ride back to Aix, their capital in Francia.

The Franks discover Ganelon's betrayal and keep him in chains until his trial, where Ganelon argues that his action was legitimate revenge, not treason. While the council of barons assembled to decide the traitor's fate is initially swayed by this claim, partially out of fear of Ganelon's friend Pinabel who threatens to fight anyone who judges Ganelon guilty, one man, Thierry, argues that because Roland was serving Charlemagne when Ganelon delivered his revenge on him, Ganelon's action constitutes a betrayal.

Pinabel challenges Thierry to trial by combat. By divine intervention, Thierry kills Pinabel. By this the Franks are convinced of Ganelon's treason. Thus, he is torn apart by having four galloping horses tied one to each arm and leg and thirty of his relatives are hanged. Bramimonde converts to Christianity, her name changing to Juliana. While sleeping, Charlemagne is told by Gabriel to ride to help King Vivien and bemoans his life.

== Form ==
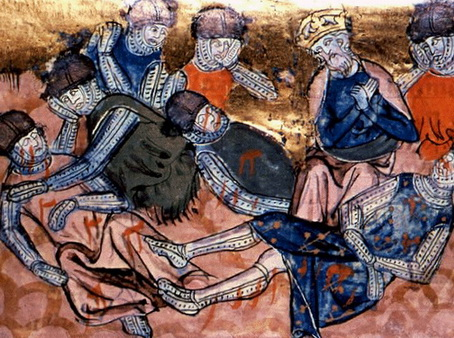
King Charlemagne finds Roland dead (14th-century miniature).

The song is written in stanzas of irregular length known as laisses. The lines are decasyllabic (containing ten syllables), and each is divided by a strong caesura which generally falls after the fourth syllable. The last stressed syllable of each line in a laisse has the same vowel sound as every other end-syllable in that laisse. The laisse is therefore an assonal, not a rhyming stanza.

On a narrative level, the Song of Roland features extensive use of repetition, parallelism, and thesis-antithesis pairs. Roland proposes Ganelon for the dangerous mission to Sarrogossa; Ganelon designates Roland to man the rearguard. Charlemagne is contrasted with Baligant. Unlike later Renaissance and Romantic literature, the poem focuses on action rather than introspection. The characters are presented through what they do, not through what they think or feel.

The narrator gives few explanations for characters' behaviour. The warriors are stereotypes defined by a few salient traits; for example, Roland is loyal and trusting while Ganelon, though brave, is traitorous and vindictive.

The story moves at a fast pace, occasionally slowing down and recounting the same scene up to three times but focusing on different details or taking a different perspective each time. The effect is similar to a film sequence shot at different angles so that new and more important details come to light with each shot.

== Characters ==
=== Principal characters ===
- Baligant, emir of Babylon; Marsile enlists his help against Charlemagne.
- Blancandrin, wise pagan; suggests bribing Charlemagne out of Spain with hostages and gifts, and then suggests dishonouring a promise to allow Marsile's baptism.
- Bramimonde, Queen of Zaragoza, King Marsile's wife; captured and converted by Charlemagne after the city falls.
- Charlemagne, King of the Franks; his forces fight the Saracens in Spain. Wields the sword Joyeuse.
- Ganelon, treacherous lord and Roland's stepfather who encourages Marsile to attack the French army. Wields the sword Murgleis.
- King Marsile, Saracen king of Spain; Roland wounds him and he dies of his wound later.
- Naimon, Charlemagne's trusted adviser.
- Oliver, Roland's friend; mortally wounded by Margarice. He represents wisdom.
- Roland, the hero of the Song and nephew of Charlemagne. Wields the sword Durandal. Leads the rear guard of the French forces; bursts his temples by blowing his olifant-horn, wounds from which he eventually dies facing the enemy's land.
- Turpin, Archbishop of Rheims, represents the force of the Church. Wields the sword Almace.

=== Secondary characters ===
- Aude, the fiancée of Roland and Oliver's sister
- Basan, Frankish baron, murdered while serving as Ambassador of Marsile.
- Bérengier, one of the twelve paladins killed by Marsile's troops; kills Estramarin; killed by Grandoyne.
- Besgun, chief cook of Charlemagne's army; guards Ganelon after Ganelon's treachery is discovered.
- Geboin, guards the Frankish dead; becomes leader of Charlemagne's 2nd column.
- Godefroy, standard bearer of Charlemagne; brother of Thierry, Charlemagne's defender against Pinabel.
- Grandoyne, fighter on Marsile's side; son of the Cappadocian King Capuel; kills Gerin, Gerier, Berenger, Guy St. Antoine, and Duke Astorge; killed by Roland.
- Hamon, joint Commander of Charlemagne's Eighth Division.
- Lorant, Frankish commander of one of the first divisions against Baligant; killed by Baligant.
- Milon, guards the Frankish dead while Charlemagne pursues the Saracen forces.
- Ogier, a Dane who leads the third column in Charlemagne's army against Baligant's forces.
- Othon, guards the Frankish dead while Charlemagne pursues the Saracen forces.
- Pinabel, fights for Ganelon in the judicial combat.
- Thierry, fights for Charlemagne in the judicial combat.

== Durandal ==
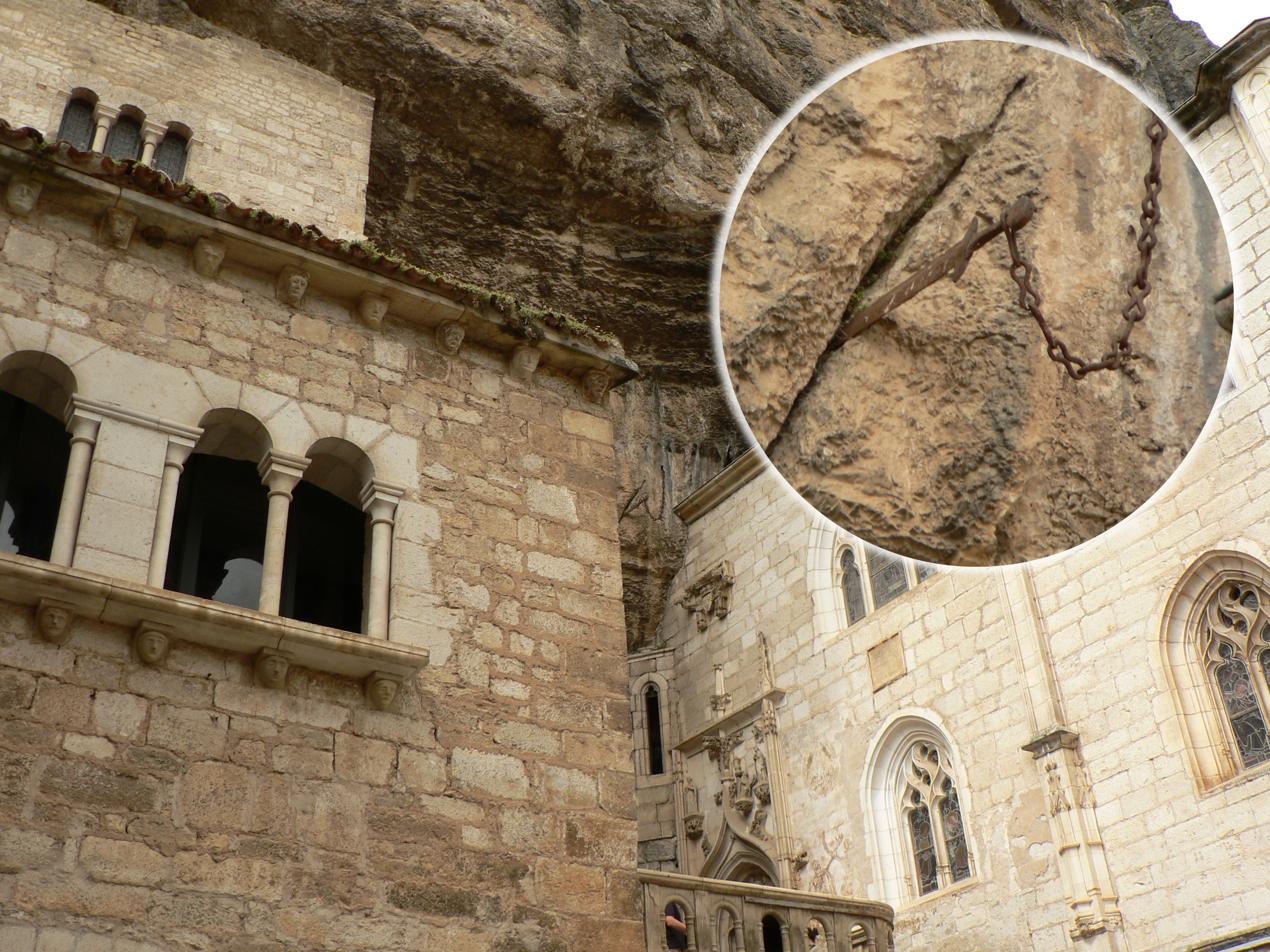
The replication of the sword found in the cliff-face next to Rocamadour's sanctuary.

According to the Song of Roland, the legendary sword called Durandal was first given to Charlemagne by an angel. It contained one tooth of Saint Peter, blood of Saint Basil, hair of Saint Denis, and a piece of the raiment of the Blessed Virgin Mary, and was supposedly the sharpest sword in all existence. In the story of the Song of Roland, the weapon is given to Roland, and he uses it to defend himself single-handedly against thousands of Muslim attackers. According to one 12th-century legend from the French town of Rocamadour, Roland threw the sword into a cliffside. A replication of the legendary sword can be found there, embedded into the cliff-face next to the town's sanctuary.

== Historical adaptations ==
A Latin poem, Carmen de Prodicione Guenonis, was composed around 1120, and a Latin prose version, Historia Caroli Magni (often known as "The Pseudo-Turpin") even earlier. Around 1170, a version of the French poem was translated into the Middle High German Rolandslied by Konrad der Pfaffe (formerly thought to have been the author of the Kaiserchronik). In his translation Konrad replaces French topics with generically Christian ones. The work was translated into Middle Dutch in the 13th century.

It was also rendered into Occitan verse in the 14th- or 15th-century poem of Ronsasvals, which incorporates the later, southern aesthetic into the story. An Old Norse version of the Song of Roland exists as Karlamagnús saga, and a translation into the artificial literary language of Franco-Venetian is also known; such translations contributed to the awareness of the story in Italy. In 1516 Ludovico Ariosto published his epic Orlando Furioso, which deals largely with characters first described in the Song of Roland.

There is also a Faroese adaptation of this ballad named "Runtsivalstríðið" (Battle of Roncevaux), and a Norwegian version called "Rolandskvadet", also called "Roland og Magnus kongen" .The ballad is one of many sung during the Faroese folkdance tradition of chain dancing.

== Modern adaptations ==
The poem was adapted into an over-400 page version called The Story of Roland by the 19th-/early 20th-century children's book author, James Baldwin. It was also adapted, in a shorter version for even younger readers, by Henrietta Elizabeth Marshall in 1907, as Stories of Roland (Told to the Children).

The Chanson de Roland has an important place in the background of Graham Greene's The Confidential Agent, published in 1939. The book's protagonist had been a medieval scholar specialising in this work, until the outbreak of the Spanish Civil War forced him to become a soldier and secret agent. Throughout the book, he repeatedly compares himself and other characters with the characters of "Roland".

The Song of Roland is part of the Matter of France (the Continental counterpart to the Arthurian legendarium known as the Matter of Britain), and related to Orlando Innamorato and Orlando Furioso. The names Roland and Orlando are cognates.

Emanuele Luzzati's animated short film, I paladini di Francia, together with Giulio Gianini, in 1960, was turned into the children's picture-story book, with verse narrative, I Paladini de Francia ovvero il tradimento di Gano di Maganz, which translates literally as "The Paladins of France or the treachery of Ganelon of Mainz" (Ugo Mursia Editore, 1962). This was then republished, in English, as Ronald and the Wizard Calico (1969). The Picture Lion paperback edition (William Collins, London, 1973) is a paperback imprint of the Hutchinson Junior Books edition (1969), which credits the English translation to Hutchinson Junior Books.

Luzzati's original verse story in Italian is about the plight of a beautiful maiden called Biancofiore – White Flower, or Blanchefleur – and her brave hero, Captain Rinaldo, and Ricardo and his paladins – the term used for Christian knights engaged in Crusades against the Saracens (Muslims) and Moors. Battling with these good people are the wicked Moors – North African Muslims and Arabs – and their Sultan, in Jerusalem. With the assistance of the wicked and treacherous magician, Gano of Maganz, Biancofiore is stolen from her fortress castle, and taken to become the reluctant wife of the Sultan. The catalyst for victory is the good magician, Urlubulu, who lives in a lake, and flies through the air on the back of his magic blue bird. The English translators, using the original illustrations, and the basic rhyme patterns, slightly simplify the plot, changing the Christians-versus-Muslim-Moors conflict into a battle between good and bad magicians and between golden knights and green knights. The French traitor in The Song of Roland, who is actually Roland's cowardly step-father, is Ganelon – very likely the inspiration for Luzzati's traitor and wicked magician, Gano. Orlando Furioso (literally, Furious or Enraged Orlando, or Roland), includes Orlando's cousin, the paladin Rinaldo, who, like Orlando, is also in love with Angelica, a pagan princess. Rinaldo is, of course, the Italian equivalent of Ronald. Flying through the air on the back of a magic bird is equivalent to flying on a magic hippogriff.

It appears in the 1994 video game Marathon, by Bungie, in the 13th level. Durandal is also the name of the main antagonist of the game.

In 2017 Michael Eging and Steve Arnold released a novel, The Silver Horn Echoes: A Song of Roland, inspired by the La Chanson de Roland.

In 2019 the German folk rock band dArtagnan released "Chanson de Roland", a modern adaptation of the Song of Roland. It has garnered over 3.9 million views on YouTube.

(Many musical works, especially operas, and works of art have elements from the Song of Roland but were more directly inspired by other Roland/Orlando traditions, such as Orlando furioso, and are not included here.)

== See also ==
- Childe Rowland
- Childe Roland to the Dark Tower Came
- Roland's Breach
- Matter of France
- Herzog Ernst
- Lamprecht
