= Prise d'Orange =

12th-century poem

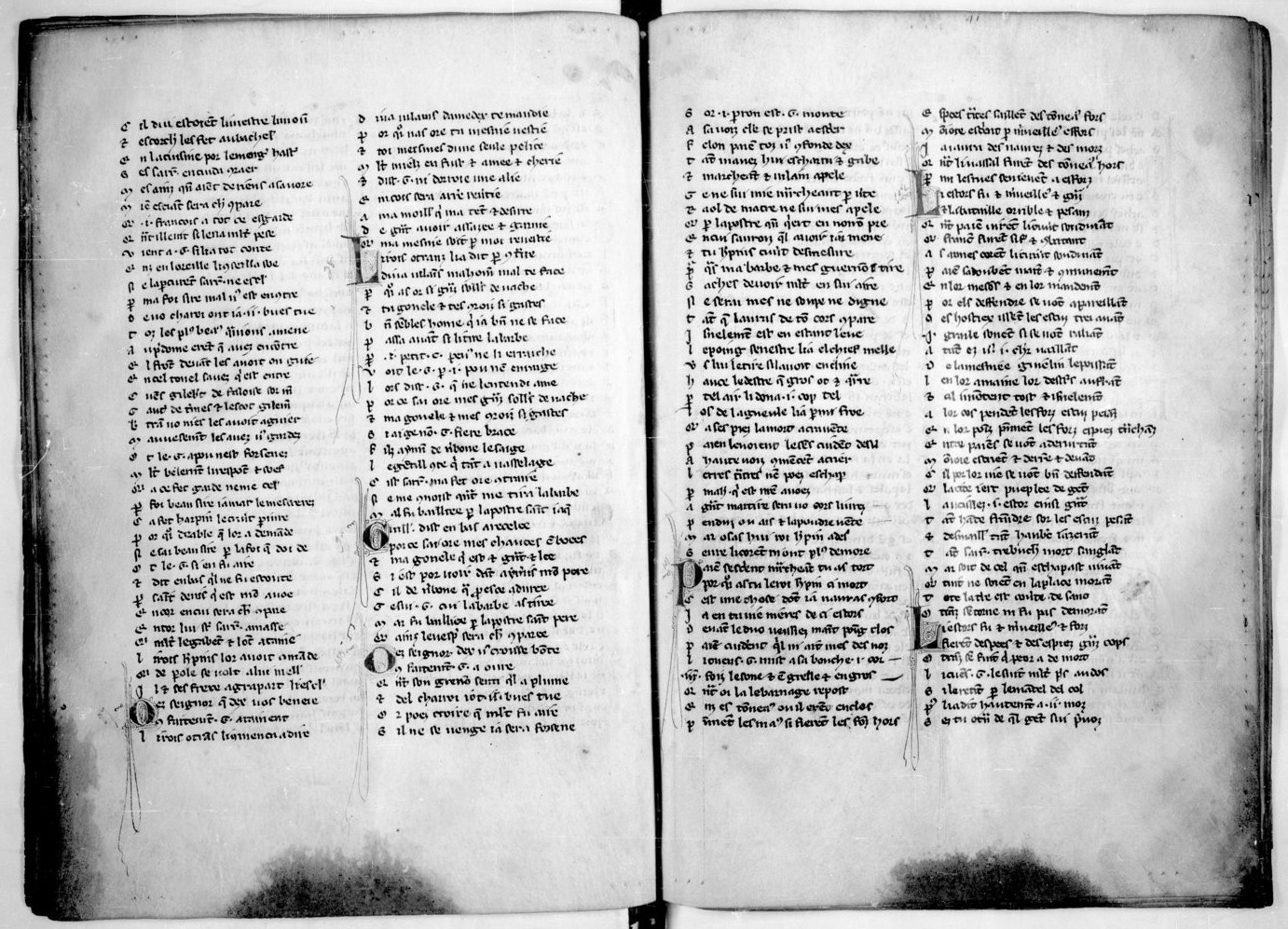
Folio 41 of manuscript français 774, Bibliothèque nationale de France, containing the opening lines of Prise d'Orange

Prise d'Orange (literally "Taking of Orange"; (Note: "Prise" is the noun form of "prendre". See "prise". Dictionnaire étymologique de l'ancien français. Heidelberg Academy of Sciences and Humanities. "Prendre" means "to take" or "to seize". See Urwin, Kenneth (1985) [1946]. A Short Old French Dictionary for Students. Basil Blackwell. p. 79. ISBN 978-0-631-07970-5. OCLC 1036943872.) also translated "The Capture of Orange" and "The Conquest of Orange") is a mid-12th century chanson de geste written in Old French. Its fictional story follows the hero Guillaume as he captures the walled city of Orange from Saracens and marries Orable, its queen. Other characters include Arragon, the king of Orange, and Tibaut, Orable's erstwhile husband and Arragon's father. The anonymously written poem, part of a larger cycle about Guillaume called La Geste de Garin de Monglane, consists of 1,888 decasyllable verses in laisses. It combines motifs of courtly love with an epic story of military conquest. The narrative is humorous and parodies the tropes of epic poetry.

The surviving text of Prise was probably based on an earlier version, composed at the beginning of the 12th century, which emphasized war over love and contained a section called Siège d'Orange about Tibaut's military campaign to recapture Orange from Guillaume. Nine manuscript versions of Prise survive. Its plot is attested in other sources including a 15th-century prose compilation of stories about Guillaume. The first modern edition was published in 1854; several reconstructions followed in the 20th century. A portion of Siège d'Orange was discovered in 2021.

== Background ==
The chansons de geste are a group of around 120 poems composed in Old French in the 12th and 13th centuries about nobles affiliated with the Carolingian dynasty. Chanson indicates that the poems were usually sung. Geste is from gesta, a Latin word for "deed".

Prise is part of a cycle of 24 chansons about a fictional hero named William of Orange (Guillaume) and his relations. The 24 poems are a "complete epic biography" of Guillaume, from youth to old age. Sometimes simply termed the "cycle of Guillaume", this group of chansons is also called La Geste de Garin de Monglane, after a designation adopted by Bertrand de Bar-sur-Aube in the prologue to Girart de Vienne. Garin de Monglane is Guillaume's great-grandfather and the founder of the epic family of which Guillaume is the central character.

Charles A. Knudson and T. V. F. Brogan call this cycle the "most cohesive" group of chansons. Six poems are about Guillaume personally; Lynette R. Muir places Prise fourth in that group. Joan M. Ferrante groups Prise with Charroi de Nîmes, Chanson de Guillaume, and Aliscans as accounts early in Guillaume's life, dominated by his campaigns against Saracens. Prise comes after Charroi in the narrative time of the cycle and invokes Charroi in its opening lines.

In the cycle, Guillaume, an epic hero guided by divine inspiration, defends Christendom against Muslim leaders of al-Andalus. His chief characteristics include good humour, devotion to Louis the Pious, and strength. Prise and other poems in the cycle dramatize feudal concepts such as the fealty of a vassal to his lord, highlight military campaigns, and often show "pagan women" who love "Christian men".

Guillaume's main historical counterpart is probably William of Gellone, who was the duke of Toulouse from 790, became a monk at Saint-Guilhem-le-Désert Abbey (sometimes simply called Gellone) in 806, and died around 812. The name "Guillaume" was extremely common in the Middle Ages; Joseph Bédier identified sixteen other candidates for the historical Guillaume.

Prise is "ostensibly" set in the reign of Louis the Pious. The narrative is not based on history: although Orange was occupied by the Moors of al-Andalus in the early 8th century, William of Gellone never conquered Orange. Tibaut is fictional. Léon Gautier, Alfred Jeanroy, and Raymond Weeks, who calls it "stupid and impossible", argue that Prise is entirely unrealistic. Jeanroy, in his critique, notes that major narrative elements are implausibly repeated; Weeks likewise points out "not a small number of inconsistencies and repetitions", concluding that "so full is this poem of wearisome commonplaces, so deficient in epic power, that no one has yet been found to claim for it the slightest merit."

== Plot ==
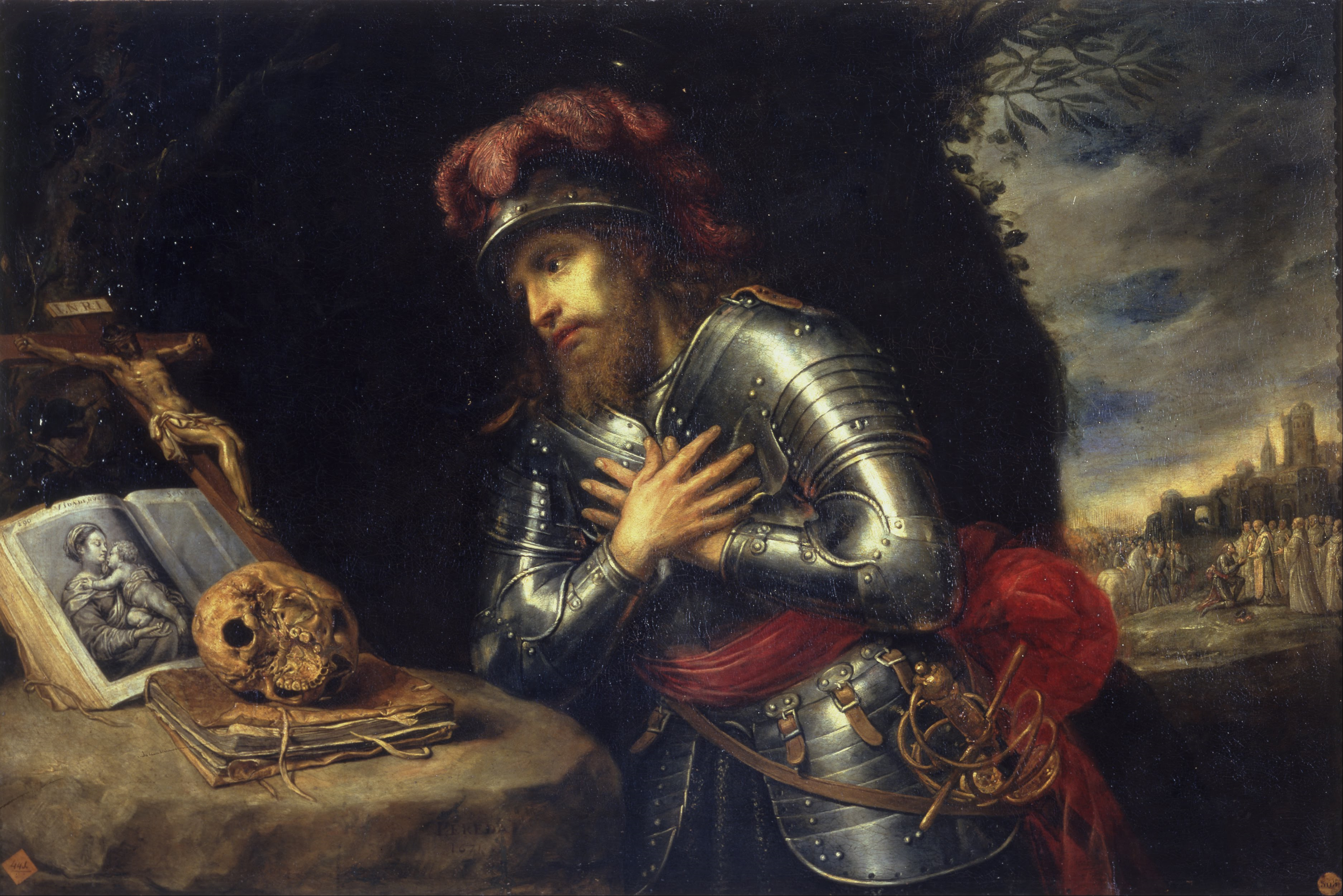
San Guillermo de Aquitania (1671), portrait of William of Gellone by Antonio de Pereda

Guillebert de Laon, an escaped prisoner from the walled city of Orange, visits Guillaume in Nîmes. He describes the beauties of the Saracen-held city, defended by 20,000 men and ruled by King Arragon, son of Tibaut. Guillebert also tells of Orable, queen of Orange and Tibaut's stunningly beautiful wife.

Guillaume is growing restless at Nîmes: there are no minstrels or women to distract him, no rivals to fight. So he decides to see Orange for himself, resolving to take "la dame et la cité" (the woman and the city). His nephew Bertran declines to come with him, but Guielin, another nephew, comes along. Guillaume, Guielin, and Guillebert disguise themselves as Turks and travel along the Rhône and Sorgue until they reach Orange. Pretending to bring news of Tibaut from Africa, they infiltrate the city and make their way to Gloriette, the tower where Orable lives.

Still in Turkish disguise, Guillaume meets Orable and charms her with stories of the great Guillaume of Nîmes. His ruse is eventually discovered. Guillaume and his henchmen kill the queen's guards and take the palace for themselves. Orable is won over to Guillaume's side and, out of pity, gives him her husband's armour.

The fighting has not yet ended. Orange's Saracen defenders enter the palace through a secret entrance. They retake the palace and imprison Guillaume, Guillebert, and Guielin. Orable frees them in exchange for Guillaume's hand in marriage, which he accepts. Meanwhile, Guillebert is sent back to Nîmes to muster reinforcements.

When King Arragon returns, he has Guillaume, Orable, and Guielin imprisoned again. They again escape. Nîmes's forces, led by Bertran—who has now reconsidered his participation in the expedition—arrive and take the city. Guillaume and Orable marry. She is baptized Guibourc. They live (mostly) happily ever after, remaining in Orange while fighting off the Saracens.

== Structure ==
Prise comprises 1,888 decasyllable verses in laisses. Decasyllable metre is standard across the chansons de geste, including in those chronicling Guillaume's adventures, and in Old French epic generally. The laisse is a group of lines, of varying length, into which chansons are divided. A laisse is defined by the vowel sound that ends each of its lines: all lines in a laisse have assonance with one another, such that the same vowel sound is repeated at the end of each line.

The verse of Prise is repetitive and formulaic. A basic element of Old French epic poetry is the hemistich, or half-line. Prise has approximately 3,700 hemistichs in total, 39 percent of which are repeated. Barbara D. Schurfranz argues that repetition, more than its division into laisses, gives Prise structural integrity. In her view, repetition emphasizes the connections between distinct narrative elements, draws the reader's attention to important plot points, and reinforces Prise's comic episodes in particular.

== Textual history ==
The text of Prise dates from the mid-12th century, circa 1160–1165. Nine manuscripts survive that contain Prise and other poems in the cycle dealing with Guillaume and his exploits. Five of the nine are housed at the Bibliothèque nationale de France. The manuscripts were likely compiled by more than one poet; Prise itself is anonymous.

The surviving version of Prise is based on a lost version of the same story. The earlier version was probably composed at the beginning of the 12th century, before the surviving versions of Li coronemenz Looïs (Couronnement de Louis) and Charroi de Nîmes, and was more focused on war than on romance and adventure. Scholars have inferred the existence of a proto-Prise from discussion in Vita sancti Wilhelmi, a text written at Gellone which also describes a campaign against Orange; and other texts including Chanson de la croisade contre les Albigeois (1213), Chanson de Guillaume, Siège de Barbastre, and I nerbonesi, a work by Andrea da Barberino. (Note: Croisade is an epic in Occitan. Siège de Barbastre is another chanson in the cycle centred on Guillaume's life which describes the capture of Barbastre (possibly Barbastro) by Beuves de Commarchis, one of Guillaume's brothers, and Beuves's sons Girart and Guielin. Nerbonesi, which dates from around 1410, is a prose compilation in Italian.)

The older, lost Prise also describes a siege of Orange by Tibaut, Arragon's father and (the now) Guibourc's husband. In this episode, called Siège d'Orange, Tibaut returns to recapture the city and wife that he lost to Guillaume in the portions of the narrative that survive. As Madeleine Tyssens points out, it would be odd if the "prideful" Tibaut did not try to avenge Guillaume's conquest. Siège was thought to be completely lost until 2021, when Tamara Atkin discovered a 47-line fragment of it, incorporated into the binding of a 1528 book, in the Bodleian Library at the University of Oxford.

Around 1450, Couronnement, Charroi, and Prise were adapted in a prose text called Roman de Guillaume d'Orange, which survives in two manuscripts. Roman and Prise differ in several respects: in Prise, Guillaume is shown meeting Orable for the first time, for instance, whereas in Roman they know each other already. Orable's conversion to Christianity is also treated differently in the two versions.

Willem Jozef Andreas Jonckbloet edited Guillaume d'Orange, Chansons de geste des XIe et XIIe siècles, a collection of chansons including Prise first published in 1854. Blanche Katz edited a version published in 1947, using the same manuscripts as Jonckbloet. Her edition reproduces several folios of the manuscript in facsimile. Claude Régnier edited Les Rédactions en vers de la Prise d'Orange, first published in 1966. Régnier's Rédactions contains three separate reconstructions of Prise based on three families of manuscripts. At least four editions of Rédactions were published. An edition by Claude Lachet, based on a single manuscript, was published in 2010.

Claude Lachet and Jean-Pierre Tusseau's translation of Régnier's manuscript reconstruction into modern French was published in 1972, with a second edition in 1974. Both editions were based on Régnier's Old French reconstruction. Joan M. Ferrante's English translations of Prise, Couronnement, Aliscans, and Moniage Guillaume I, the first English versions of each, were first published in 1974. Lynette R. Muir's English Prise, published in a volume edited by Glanville Price and based on the Old French text in Régnier's Rédactions, followed in 1975. A set of English translations of Prise and several other chansons by Michael A. H. Newth was published in 2014.

== Interpretation ==
Prise blends a chivalric romance of courtly love with an epic tale of military conquest. Language traditionally used for epic adventures is repurposed to describe Guillaume's romantic exploits. Sharon Kinoshita argues that the juxtaposition of military conquest and the love plot is not accidental. Rather, describing Prise as a tale of "conquest-by-seduction", she argues that it treats love and war as two sides of the same coin. Lucas Wood suggests that the combination of epic and romance tends to "trivialize" epic themes such as feudalism and military might. According to Minnette Grunmann-Gaudet, Prise's narrative is shaped by Guillaume's struggle between the opposing roles of lover and conquering hero.

Orable (Guibourc) is cast as a faithful "helpmeet-heroine" who supports Guillaume on the battlefield and in the bedroom. She is an example of the Saracen princess, a trope in medieval literature in which a woman coded as "non-Western" marries a "Christian knight". The trope appears in at least 15 chansons de geste and Orable herself appears in several chansons other than Prise. Kinoshita suggests that Orable represents a foreign world to be conquered and converted by Christendom: "to seduce Orable and to convert her to Christianity is to assimilate Orange to Frankish Christendom, under the tutelage of the intrepid Count Guillaume." However, Charles A. Knudson notes that it is the Saracen princess, not the knight of Christendom, who generally professes her love first—and helps the knight escape from Saracen clutches. In other respects, Orable is not consistent with the trope: she is older than most Saracen princesses and, unlike in other chansons, her meeting with the hero, Guillaume, is not by chance.

By contrast with other chansons about his exploits, the Guillaume of Prise is generally motivated by love as opposed to fealty or religious fervour. He is weak-willed and mercurial, depending on encouragement from his more purpose-driven companions. Summarizing the views of several critics, Grunmann-Gaudet describes Guillaume as "a ridiculous caricature of the epic hero". Guillaume's weak will is contrasted with Orable's firmness of mind: she proposes marriage to him and upbraids him for his inconstancy.

Compared to earlier chansons de geste, the tone of Prise is playful, comic, and parodic. According to William W. Kibler, Joseph Bédier's 1908 study Les Légendes épiques was the first to treat Prise as a comic text. Logan Whalen argues that Prise is not the only funny chanson: Couronnement and Charroi, writes Whalen, also have a comic style. Claude Régnier calls Prise a "masterpiece of humour", noting its "discreetly parodic" use of tropes of the epic genre. Joseph J. Duggan, dismissing Régnier's suggestion, says Prise's "unimaginative" use of epic tropes "approaches self-parody".

== Works cited ==
- Amer, Sahar (1999). "Epic and Beast Epic". In Sinnreich-Levi, Deborah M.; Laurie, Ian S. (eds.). Literature of the French and Occitan Middle Ages: Eleventh to Fifteenth Centuries. Gale. p. 286. ISBN 0-7876-3102-7. OCLC 41086676.
- Baldick, Chris (2008). "Hemistich". The Oxford Dictionary of Literary Terms (3d ed.). Oxford University Press. p. 150. ISBN 978-0-19-923891-0. OCLC 177014773.
- Bédier, Joseph (1908). Les légendes épiques : recherches sur la formation des chansons de geste (in French). Honoré Champion. OCLC 1141306693.
- Bennett, Philip E. (2004). The Cycle of Guillaume d'Orange or Garin de Monglane: A Critical Bibliography. Tamesis. ISBN 1-85566-105-5. ISSN 1476-9700. OCLC 56617365.
- Burgess, Glyn S. (2015). "Review of Aiol and Heroines of the French Epic: A Second Selection of Chansons de Geste". Speculum. 90 (3): 834–836. doi:10.1017/S0038713415001189. ISSN 0038-7134. JSTOR 43577480.
- Burgwinkle, William (10 April 2008). "The Marital and the Sexual". In Gaunt, Simon; Kay, Sarah (eds.). The Cambridge Companion to Medieval French Literature. Cambridge University Press. pp. 225–237. doi:10.1017/ccol9780521861755.016. ISBN 978-0-521-67975-6.
- Classen, Albrecht (2002). "Saracen Princess". In Lindahl, Carl; McNamara, John; Lindow, John (eds.). Medieval Folklore: A Guide to Myths, Legends, Tales, Beliefs, and Customs. Oxford University Press. pp. 358–359. ISBN 0-19-514772-3. OCLC 48544472.
- Colby-Hall, Alice M. (1981). "In Search of the Lost Epics of the Lower Rhône Valley". Olifant. 8 (4): 339–351. ISSN 0381-9132. JSTOR 45298612.
- Corbellari, Alain (2011). Guillaume d'Orange ou la naissance du héros médiéval (in French). Klincksieck. ISBN 978-2-252-03796-6. OCLC 758353325.
- Duggan, Joseph J. (1973). The Song of Roland: Formulaic Style and Poetic Craft. University of California Press. ISBN 0-520-02201-7. OCLC 629242.
- Ferrante, Joan M. (1974). Guillaume d'Orange: Four Twelfth-Century Epics. Columbia University Press. hdl:2027/heb.05993. ISBN 0-231-03809-7. OCLC 858797.
- Flood, Alison (18 November 2021). "Fragment of Lost 12th-Century Epic Poem Found in Another Book's Binding". The Guardian.
- Fox, John (1974). A Literary History of France: The Middle Ages. Ernest Benn Limited. ISBN 0-06-492218-9. OCLC 2236433.
- Gautier, Léon (1868). Les épopées françaises : étude sur les origines et l'histoire de la littérature nationale (in French). Vol. 3. Victor Palmé. OCLC 1141328537.
- Grunmann-Gaudet, Minnette (1979). "From Epic to Romance: The Paralysis of the Hero in the Prise d'Orange". Olifant. 7 (1): 22–38. ISSN 0381-9132. JSTOR 45297985.
- Hasenohr, Geneviève; Zink, Michel, eds. (1992). Dictionnaire des lettres françaises (in French). Vol. 1. Fayard. ISBN 2-253-05662-6. OCLC 489672003.
- Heinemann, Edward A. (2011). "Review of La Prise d'Orange. Chanson de geste (fin XIIe – début XIIIe siècle)". Olifant. 26 (2): 247–265. ISSN 0381-9132. JSTOR 48603131.
- Hindley, Alan; Levy, Brian J. (1983). The Old French Epic: Texts, Commentaries, Notes. Peeters. ISBN 2-8017-0206-4. OCLC 10065440.
- Jeanroy, Alfred (1897). "Études sur le cycle de Guillaume au court nez: II". Romania (in French). 26 (101): 1–33. doi:10.3406/roma.1897.5485. ISSN 0035-8029. JSTOR 45042989.
- Kibler, William W. (January 1974). "Humor in the Prise d'Orange". Studi di letteratura francese. 3: 5–25. ISSN 0585-4768. ProQuest 1298099681.
- Kinoshita, Sharon (2006). "The Politics of Courtly Love: La Prise d'Orange and the Conversion of the Saracen Queen". Medieval Boundaries. University of Pennsylvania Press. pp. 46–74. doi:10.9783/9780812202489.46. ISBN 978-0-8122-3919-5.
- Knudson, Charles A. (August 1949). "Review of La Prise d'Orange". Romance Philology. 3: 73–81. JSTOR 44938480.
- Knudson, Charles A. (May 1969). "Le thème de la princesse sarrasine dans La Prise d'Orange". Romance Philology (in French). 22 (4): 449–462. ISSN 0035-8002. JSTOR 44940461.
- Mériz, Diana Teresa (May 1978). "Review of William, Count of Orange: Four Old French Epics". Olifant. 5 (4): 307–313. ISSN 0381-9132. JSTOR 45297898.
- Moreno, Paola (2001). "Une allusion au Siège d'Orange perdu dans Foucon de Candie". In Luongo, Salvatore (ed.). Épopée romane au Moyen Âge et aux temps modernes: Actes du XIVe Congrès International de la Société Rencesvals pour l'Étude des Épopées Romanes (in French). Vol. 1. Fridericiana Editrice Universitaria. pp. 481–487. ISBN 88-8338-018-5. OCLC 49495243.
- Heroines of the French Epic: A Second Selection of Chansons de Geste. Translated by Newth, Michael A. H. D. S. Brewer. 2014. ISBN 978-1-78204-285-3. OCLC 884863411.
- Preminger, Alex; Brogan, T. V. F., eds. (1993). The New Princeton Encyclopedia of Poetry and Poetics. Princeton University Press. ISBN 0-691-03271-8. OCLC 27105877.
- Price, Glanville, ed. (1975). William, Count of Orange: Four Old French Epics. Dent; Rowman & Littlefield. ISBN 0-87471-608-X. OCLC 1093681.
- Régnier, Claude (1951). "Review of La prise d'Orange by Blanche Katz". Romania. 72 (3): 397–399. JSTOR 45045665.
- Régnier, Claude, ed. (1977). La Prise d'Orange : chanson de geste de la fin du XIIe siècle (in French) (5th ed.). Klincksieck. ISBN 2-252-01950-6. OCLC 4047830.
- Ross, David J. A. (1978). "Not Worth a Penny" (PDF). Reading Medieval Studies. Vol. 4. pp. 69–90.
- Schenck, David P. (February 1976). "Review of Guillaume d'Orange: Four Twelfth-Century Epics". The French Review. 49 (3): 408. ISSN 0016-111X. JSTOR 390185.
- Schurfranz, Barbara D. (November 1979). "Strophic Structure versus Alternative Divisions in the Prise d'Orange: Laisses versus Similar and Parallel Scenes and the Reprise Bifurquée". Romance Philology. 33 (2): 247–264. ISSN 0035-8002. JSTOR 44942075.
- Suard, François (1995). "Prise d'Orange". In Kibler, William W.; Zinn, Grover A. (eds.). Medieval France: An Encyclopedia. Garland Publishing. pp. 759–760. ISBN 0-8240-4444-4. OCLC 31937909.
- Sullivan, Penny (1981). "Le «Siège de Barbastre»: La Description concrète dans un texte épique". Olifant (in French). 8 (4): 367–375. ISSN 0381-9132. JSTOR 45298614.
- Tyssens, Madeleine (1967). "Le Siège d'Orange perdu". Boletín de la Real Academia de Buenas Letras de Barcelona (in French). 31. Reial Acadèmia de Bones Lletres de Barcelona: 321–329. ISSN 0210-7481.
- Weeks, Raymond (1901). "The Primitive Prise d'Orange". PMLA. 16 (3): 361–374. doi:10.2307/456480. JSTOR 456480. S2CID 163825635.
- Whalen, Logan E. (21 June 2021). "The Legacy of the Guillaume d'Orange Cycle: Rewriting the Charroi de Nîmes, the Couronnement de Louis, and the Prise d'Orange". In Tether, Leah; Busby, Keith (eds.). Rewriting Medieval French Literature. De Gruyter. pp. 9–30. doi:10.1515/9783110639032-005. ISBN 978-3-11-063903-2. S2CID 237873577.
- Wood, Lucas (18 January 2021). "Reading 'Guillelme l'Amïable': Hypertextuality and La Prise d'Orange". Perspectives médiévales. 42 (42). doi:10.4000/peme.38264. ISSN 0338-2338. S2CID 237880635.
