= Willehalm =

Unfinished Middle High German poem

Willehalm is an unfinished Middle High German poem from the early 13th century, written by the poet Wolfram von Eschenbach. In terms of genre, the poem is "a unique fusion of the courtly and the heroic, with elements of the saintly legend attaching to it."

== Sources ==
Willehalm is based on French sources. Its foremost source is the Old French chanson de geste Aliscans, which was written a few decades earlier. The French sources were provided by Wolfram's patron, Landgrave Hermann of Thuringia. Willehalm represents (even in its unfinished form) a drastic but artistic condensation of the sprawling French adventures Wolfram inherited. For the poem Aliscans is, in turn, likely derived from the earlier Chanson de Guillaume, inspired by a historic battle in 793 wherein the Carolingian figure of Count William of Toulouse, who featured in the Carolingian song-cycle La Geste de Garin de Monglane, was defeated by an invading Muslim army from Spain.

== Date ==
Written after the completion of Parzival - and referring as it does to the coronation of Emperor Otto in 1209 - Willehalm has been dated to the second decade of the 13th century. It has survived in sixteen manuscripts.

== Story ==
Wolfram's prologue to Willehalm had a major influence on the romance writings of the Middle Ages.

In the story, Eschenbach has the Muslim invasion motivated by a father's desire to retrieve his daughter and a husband's desire to retrieve his wife. For we are reminded by the author in Book I of a well-known tale that the protagonist, Willehalm, March Count of Provence, wooed and won Arabel, daughter of King Terramer and wife of King Tibalt, and brought her from Spain to France where he converted her to Christianity, changed her name to Giburc, and took her to wife. So Terramer and Tibalt, with numerous other kings from Spain, invade France and roundly defeat Willehalm in a battle so severe that he alone escapes alive. As Giburc lead the women in the desperate defense of the castle, Willehalm secures the aid of King Louis of France, returns with a large force, and defeats the Muslims on the same battlefield.

Though this storyline is simple, Eschenbach develops memorable characters and action, such as the touching death of Willehalm’s nephew, Vivian, a young knight who exemplifies chivalry, courage, and spiritual purity.

== See also ==
- Aliscans
- Chanson de Guillaume
- Just war theory
- Rudolf von Ems
