= Charroi de Nîmes =

Old French chanson de geste

The Charroi de Nîmes (English: "Cartage (or Convoy of Merchandise) of Nîmes") is an Old French chanson de geste from the first half of the twelfth century, part of the cycle of chansons concerning Guillaume (or William) of Orange, generally referred to collectively as the Geste de Guillaume d'Orange. The poem exists in 8 manuscripts which all include other chansons from the same cycle. The poem comprises 1,486 decasyllable verses in 57 assonanced laisses; there is no shorter syllable lines (found in some of the other chansons concerning William). 63% of the lines are in direct discourse, which give this chanson a distinctly spoken character.

The story is not based on a historical event. It goes as follows: on returning home from a hunt, William learns that King Louis (Charlemagne's son) has forgotten him in the distribution of fiefs. William reminds the king of his past service (as told in the chanson Li coronemenz Looïs), and he is eventually accorded the right to an expeditionary force to conquer Nîmes from the Saracens. Disguising himself as a merchant leading a convoy of carts, and hiding his troops in barrels on the carts, William is able to come into the city and seize it (echoing the ruse of the Trojan Horse).

The first modern edition was printed in 1857–1867 in Vol. 1 of the collected chansons about William of Orange published in The Hague by the Dutch scholar Jonkbloet.
