= Aymeri de Narbonne =

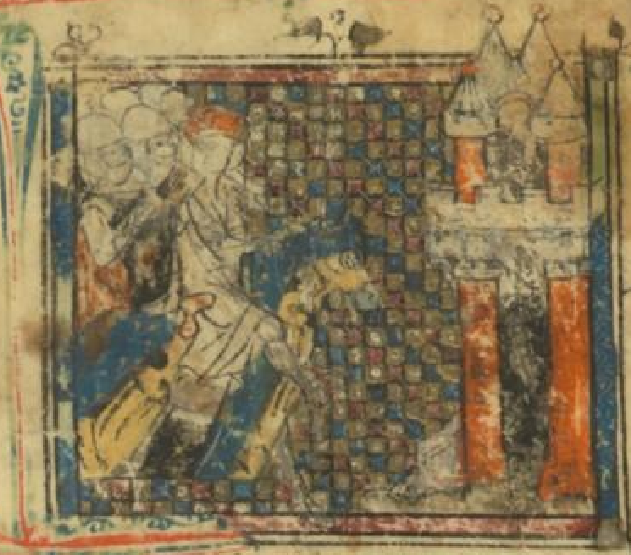

Aymeri de Narbonne is a legendary hero of Old French chansons de geste and the Matter of France. In the legendary material, as elaborated and expanded in various medieval texts, Aymeri is a knight in the time of Charlemagne's wars with the Saracens after the Battle of Roncevaux Pass. He is son of Hernaut and the grandson of Garin de Monglane. He conquers the city of Narbonne, marries a princess named Hermengarde or Hermenjart, and fathers seven sons (Guibert, Bernart, Guillaume, Garin, Hernaut, Beuve and Aymer), the most famous being Guillaume d'Orange, the hero of several popular chansons de geste.

The "Aymeri" of the poems may be conflated with a later historic figure, Aimery II of Narbonne, who was the Viscount of Narbonne from around 1106 to 1134.

== Aymeri de Narbonne ==
Aymeri de Narbonne is the hero of an eponymic early 13th century (c.1205-1225) chanson de geste (based on earlier poems) attributed to Bertrand de Bar-sur-Aube (author, as well, of Girart de Vienne which Aymeri de Narbonne follows in four of the five extant manuscripts of this poem). The poem comprises 4,708 verses grouped into 122 rhymed laisses; the verses are all decasyllables except for a short six syllable line at the end of each laisse (a similar use of shorter lines appears in the chansons de geste Aliscans and the Chanson de Guillaume). In Aymeri de Narbonne, Charlemagne, returning home from Spain after the tragic events of The Song of Roland, comes upon the city of Narbonne and offers the city as a fief to whichever of his knights will conquer it, but all the knights refuse because of their despair, except for the young Aymeri. Once he becomes lord of the city, Aymeri seeks the hand of Hermengarde, daughter of Didier, sister of Boniface the king of the Lombards in Pavia. After various adventures, including difficulties with a German lord named Savari (to whom Hermengarde had been promised previously) and attacks from the Saracens, the marriage occurs. The poem ends with a prediction about their future children, seven boys and five girls. The poem was reworked into two prose versions in the 15th century.

The Venice 4 manuscript of The Song of Roland contains, toward the end of that poem, the taking of Narbonne and Aymeri receiving it at his father's behest (laisses 285-318, https://www.rialfri.eu/rialfriWP/opere/chanson-de-roland-v-4).

The character also appears in the chanson de geste Girart de Vienne, also by Bertrand de Bar-sur-Aube. In that poem, he incites his four uncles to war against the Emperor.

== Narbonnais ==
The hero also appears in the chanson de geste entitled Narbonnais (c.1210) by an anonymous author from the Brie region. The poem comprises 8,063 decasyllable verses grouped into assonanced laisses. The manuscripts which contain the work all place it alongside other texts (Aymeri de Narbonne, Siège de Barbastre) and the title has lent itself to the entire cycle, called "the Narbonnais Cycle", which is itself often grouped with the "Cycle of Guilluame d'Orange" (itself part of the greater "Geste of Garin de Monglane"). Narbonnais was once considered to contain two distinct parts (before the critical edition of H. Suchier in 1898), and they have received their own titles: Le Département des Enfanz Aymeri (The Departure of the Children of Aymeri) and Le Siège de Narbonne (The Siege of Narbonne). Linked to this text, there also exists a Latin prose fragment preserved at The Hague. A prose version of Narbonnais was made in the 15th century. The work was also adapted by the Italian Andrea da Barberino around 1410 for his prose version Storie Nerbonesi. In the part on the departure of Aymeri's children: Aymeri sends six of his sons out to seek their own fiefs, while keeping the youngest son Guibert. The sons are successful and eventually come to the court of Charlemagne in Paris. In the part on the Siege of Narbonne: taking advantage of the departure of the sons, the Saracens attack Narbonne and nail Guibert to a cross. The youngest son is saved however, and races to the court to seek help, but he learns that Charlemagne has died, leaving his son Louis emperor. The seven sons and Louis' army eventually defeat the Saracens.

== Mort Aymeri ==
Aymeri de Narbonne is also the hero of a (probable 13th century) chanson de geste entitled Mort Aymeri (de Narbonne) (The Death of Aymeri), also called Les Sagittaires. The poem comprises 4,176 decasyllable verses grouped into assonanced and rhymed laisses. In this poem: at the end of his life, Aymeri battles to retake his city (he and his knights resort to dressing as women) and then must battle the Sagittaires, pagan centaurs, to save fourteen thousand maidens. In the end, Aymeri and two of his sons are mortally wounded and buried in Narbonne.
