= La Geste de Garin de Monglane =

Second cycle of the early "chansons de geste"

La Geste de Garin de Monglane is the second cycle of the three great cycles of chansons de geste created in the early days of the genre. It centres on Garin de Monglane. One of its main characters is William of Gellone.

== The cycle ==
The cycle of Guillaume has more unity than the other great cycles of Charlemagne or of Doon de Mayence, the various poems which compose it forming branches of the main story rather than independent epic poems. There exist numerous cyclic manuscripts in which there is an attempt at presenting a continuous histoire poétique of Guillaume and his family. Manuscript Royal 20 D xi. in the British Library contains eighteen chansons of the cycle.

The conclusions arrived at by earlier writers are combated by Joseph Bédier in the first volume, "Le Cycle de Guillaume d'Orange" (1908), of his Legendes epiques, in which he constructs a theory that the cycle of Guillaume d'Orange grew up round the various shrines on the pilgrim route to Saint Gilles of Provence and Saint James of Compostella—that the chansons de geste were, in fact, the product of 11th and 12th century poets exploiting local ecclesiastical traditions, and were not developed from earlier poems dating back perhaps to the lifetime of Guillaume of Toulouse, the saint of Gellone.

As established in the various texts, the Monglane family tree is generally as follows (spelling of names varies from text to text):

- Garin de Monglane (4 sons)
  - Hernaut
    - Aymeri de Narbonne (7 sons, 5 daughters)
      - Guibert
      - Bernart
      - Guillaume d'Orange
      - Garin d'Anseun
        - Vivien
      - Hernaut de Girone
      - Beuve de Comarchis
      - Aymer
      - Blanchefleur (marries Louis the Pious)
  - Girart de Vienne
  - Renier
    - Olivier
      - Galien
    - Aude (betrothed to Roland)
  - Milon

== Tradition and historical roots ==
No less than thirteen historical personages bearing the name of William (Guillaume) have been thought by various critics to have their share in the formation of the legend. William, count of Provence, son of Boso II, again delivered southern France from a Saracen invasion by his victory at Fraxinet in 973, and ended his life in a cloister. William Tow-head (Tête d'étoupe), duke of Aquitaine (d. 983), showed a fidelity to Louis IV paralleled by Guillaume d'Orange's service to Louis the Pious.

The cycle of twenty or more chansons which form the geste of Guillaume reposes on the traditions of the Arab invasions of the Southern France, from the battle of Poitiers (732) under Charles Martel onwards, and on the French conquest of Catalonia from the Saracens. In the Norse version of the Carolingian epic Guillaume appears in his proper historical environment, as a chief under Charlemagne; but he plays a leading part in the Couronnement Looys, describing the formal associations of Louis the Pious in the empire at Aix-la-Chapelle (813, the year after Guillaume's death), and after the battle of Aliscans it is from the emperor Louis that he seeks reinforcements.

This anachronism arises from the fusion of the epic Guillaume with the champion of Louis IV, and from the fact that he was the military and civil chief of Louis the Pious, who was titular king of Aquitaine under his father from the time when he was three years old. The inconsistencies between the real and the epic Guillaume are often left standing in the poems. The personages associated with Guillaume in his Spanish wars belong to Provence, and have names common in the south.

The most famous of these are Beuves de Comarchis, Ernaud de Girone, Garin d'Anseun, Almer le chetif, so called from his long captivity with the Saracens. The separate existence of Almer, who refused to sleep under a roof, and spent his whole life in warring against the infidel, is proved. He was Hadhemar, count of Narbonne, who in 809 and 810 was one of the leaders sent by Louis against Tortosa. No doubt the others had historical prototypes. In the hands of the poets they became all brothers of Guillaume, and sons of Aymeri de Narbonne, the grandson of Garin de Monglane, and his wife Ermenjart. Nevertheless, when Guillaume seeks help from Louis the emperor he finds all his relations in Laon, in accordance with his historic Frankish origin.

The poem of Aymeri de Narbonne contains the account of the young Aymeri's brilliant capture of Narbonne, which he then receives as a fief from Charlemagne, of his marriage with Ermenjart, sister of Boniface, king of the Lombards, and of their children. The fifth daughter, Blanchefleur, is represented as the wife of Louis the Pious. The opening of this poem furnished, though indirectly, the matter of the Aymerillot of Victor Hugo's La Légende des siècles. The central fact of the geste of Guillaume is the battle of the Archamp or Aliscans, in which perished Guillaume's heroic nephew, Vezian or Vivien, a second Roland. At the eleventh hour he summoned Guillaume to his help against the overwhelming forces of the Saracens. Guillaume arrived too late to help Vivien, was himself defeated, and returned alone to his wife Guibourc, leaving his knights all dead or prisoners.

This event is related in a Norman transcript of an old French chanson de geste, the Chançun de Willame—which only was brought to light in 1901 at the sale of the books of Sir Henry Hope Edwardes—in the Covenant Vivien, a recension of an older French chanson and in Aliscans. Aliscans continues the story, telling how Guillaume obtained reinforcements from Laon, and how, with the help of the comic hero, the scullion Rainouart or Rennewart, he avenged the defeat of Aliscans and his nephew's death. Rainouart turns out to be the brother of Guillaume's wife Guibourc, who was before her marriage the Saracen princess and enchantress Orable.

Two other poems are consecrated to his later exploits, La Bataille Loquifer, the work of a French Sicilian poet, Jendeu de Brie (fl. 1170), and Le Moniage Rainouart. The starting-point of Herbert le duc of Dammartin (fl. 1170) in Foucon de Candie (Candie = Gandia in Spain?) is the return of Guillaume from the battle; and the Italian compilation I Nerbonesi, based on these and other chansons, seems in some cases to represent an earlier tradition than the later of the French chansons, although its author Andrea di Barberino wrote towards the end of the 14th century. The minnesinger Wolfram von Eschenbach based his Willehalm on a French original which must have differed from the versions we have. The variations in the story of the defeat of Aliscans or the Archant, and the numerous inconsistencies of the narratives even when considered separately have occupied many critics.

Aliscans (Aleschans, Alyscamps, Elysii Campi) was, however, generally taken to represent the battle of Villedaigne, and to take its name from the famous cemetery outside Arles. Wolfram von Eschenbach even mentions the tombs which studded the field of battle. Indications that this tradition was not unassailable were not lacking before the discovery of the Chançun de Willame, which, although preserved in a very corrupt form, represents the earliest recension we have of the story, dating at least from the beginning of the 12th century. It seems probable that the Archant was situated in Spain near Vivien's headquarters at Tortosa, and that Guillaume started from Barcelona, not from Orange, to his nephew's help.

The account of the disaster was modified by successive trouvères, and the uncertainty of their methods may be judged by the fact that in the Chançun de Willame two consecutive accounts (11. 450-1326 and 1r. 1326-2420) of the fight appear to be set side by side as if they were separate episodes. Le Couronnement Looys, already mentioned, Le Charroi de Nîmes (12th century) in which Guillaume, who had been forgotten in the distribution of fiefs, enumerates his services to the terrified Louis, and Aliscans (12th century), with the earlier Chançun, are among the finest of the French epic poems. The figure of Vivien is among the most heroic elaborated by the poets, and the giant Rainouart has more than a touch of Rabelaisian humour.

== Component chansons ==
The chansons de geste of the cycle of Guillaume are:

- Enfances Garin de Monglane (15th century) and Garin de Monglane (13th century), on which is founded the prose romance of Guerin de Monglane, printed in the 15th century by Jehan Trepperel and often later
- Girars de Viane (13th century, by Bertrand de Bar-sur-Aube), ed. P. Tarbe (Reims, 1850)
- Hernaut de Beaulande (fragment 14th century)
- Renier de Gennes, which only survives in its prose form
- Aymeri de Narbonne (c. 1210) by Bertrand de Bar-sur-Aube, ed. L bemaison (Soc. des anc. textes fr., Paris, 2 volumes, 1887)
- Les Enfances Guillaume (13th century)
- Les Narbonnais, ed. H. Suchier (Soc. des anc. textes fr., 2 volumes, 1898), with a Latin fragment dating from the 11th century, preserved at the Hague
- Le Couronnement Looys (ed. Ernest Langlois, 1888)
- Le Charroi de Nîmes
- La Prise d'Orange
- Le Covenant Vivien
- Aliscans (the previous five titles were edited by WJA Jonckbloet in volume i. of his Guillaume d'Orange (The Hague, 1854); a critical text of Aliscans (Halle, 1903, volume 1.) is edited by E Wienbeck, W Hartnacke and P Rasch)
- Loquifer and Le Moniage Rainouart (12th century)
- Bovon de Commarchis (13th century), recension of the earlier:
  - Siege de Barbastre, by Adenet le Roi, ed. A Scheler (Brussels, 1874)
- Guibert d'Andrenas (13th century)
- La Prise de Cordres (13th century)
- La Mort Aymeri de Narbonne, ed. J Couraye de Parc (Paris: Société des anciens textes français, 1884)
- Foulque de Candie (ed. P Tarbe, Reims, 1860)
- Le Moniage Guillaume (12th century)
- Les Enfances Vivien (ed. C Wahlund and H von Feilitzen, Upsala and Paris, 1895)
- Chançun de Willame (Chiswick Press, 1903), described by P Meyer in Romania (xxxiii. 597-618).

The ninth branch of the Karlamagnus Saga (ed. C. R. Unger, Christiania, 1860) deals with the geste of Guillaume. I Nerbonesi is edited by J. G. Isola (Bologna, 1877, etc.).

== Afterlife of the poems ==
The family continues in Italian tradition, called "Mongrana" in Andrea da Barberino's works, Reali di Francia (ed. Vandelli & Gambarin), and Storie Nerbonesi (ed. I.G. Isola) from which (among other works) Matteo Maria Boiardo will develop his Orlando Innamorato and Ludovico Ariosto his Orlando Furioso.
