= Sautperdu =

Fictional warhorse

Sautperdu, or Saut-Perdu, ("wild-leap") is the warhorse of Malquiant, one of the Saracens in the French epic, The Song of Roland. Sautperdu is mentioned in laisse 120 of the poem.
