= Sharon Kinoshita =

Professor of medieval literature

Professor Sharon Kinoshita
- Occupation: Professor of Literature at UC Santa Cruz

Academic work
- Discipline: Medieval studies, Medieval French, Comparative Literature
- Sub-discipline: Medieval French literature, Old French Literature, Postcolonial theory
- Institutions: UC Santa Cruz

Sharon Kinoshita is a professor of medieval literature, and co-director of the UCSC Center for Mediterranean Studies at UC Santa Cruz. In 2016, she published a new translation of Marco Polo's 'Description of the World', from the Franco-Italian 'F' version of the text. In 2023, she was elected a Fellow of the Medieval Academic of America.

== Academic work ==
Kinoshita has published extensively on a range of Mediterranean medieval topics, including medieval French literature, Marie de France, the values of feudal society, the mid-12th century chanson de geste 'Prise d'Orange', the crusades, feminist criticism, Chrétien de Troyes, courtly love, and the writing and life of Marco Polo.

Kinoshita's 2006 book, Medieval Boundaries, was awarded an Honorable Mention as a contender for the Aldo and Jeanne Scaglione Prize for French and Francophone Studies by the Medieval Language Association. The book explores representations of cultural contact between “France” and the Islamic and Byzantine worlds.

In 2021, Kinoshita delivered the Medieval Academy of America plenary at the International Congress on Medieval Studies Kalamazoo virtual conference, on “Marco Polo and the Diversity of the Global Middle Ages”.

== Publications ==
- Translator, Marco Polo, The Description of the World. Indianapolis: Hackett Press, 2016.
- Co-editor, with Peregrine Horden, A Companion to Mediterranean History. Oxford: Wiley-Blackwell, 2014.
- Co-author, with Peggy McCracken, Marie de France: A Critical Companion. Gallica. Woodbridge: Boydell & Brewer, 2012.
- Author of Medieval Boundaries: Rethinking Difference in Old French Literature. Philadelphia: U of Pennsylvania Press, 2006.
- Author of “Crusades and Identity.” Cambridge History of French Literature. Ed. William Burgwinkle, Nicholas Hammond, and Emma Wilson. Cambridge: Cambridge UP, 2011. pp. 93–101
- Author of “Cherchez La Femme: Feminist Criticism and Marie De France’s ‘Lai De Lanval.’” Romance Notes, vol. 34, no. 3, 1994, p. 263.
