= Girart de Vienne =

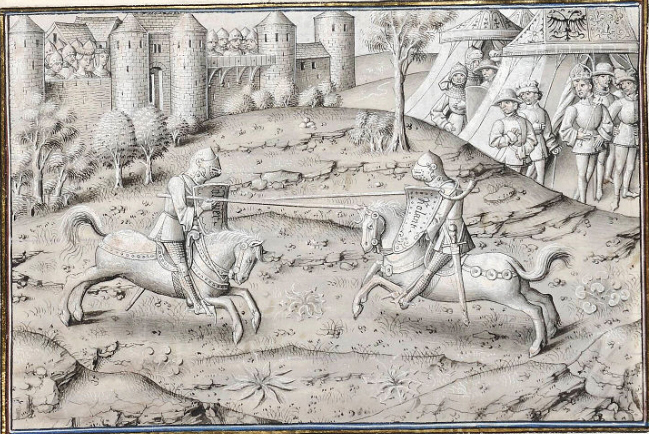
The duel between Roland and Olivier in the ‘Girart de Vienne’

Girart de Vienne is a late twelfth-century (c.1180) Old French chanson de geste by Bertrand de Bar-sur-Aube. The work tells the story of the sons of Garin de Monglane and their battles with the Emperor Charlemagne, and it establishes the friendship of the epic heroes Olivier and Roland.

The poem comprises more than 6000 rhymed decasyllable verses grouped into laisses. It was likely based on a now lost earlier poem. The work was extremely popular up until the Renaissance, and was converted into a version with alexandrines (14th century) and five prose versions, including one by David Aubert (in his Chroniques et conquestes de Charlemagne), one by Raffaele Marmora, one by Jean d'Outremeuse, and one attached to the prose version of Garin de Monglane.

== Plot ==
In the beginning, each of the four sons of Garin de Monglane—Hernaut, Girart, Renier and Milon—comes into possession of a fief (Renier becomes the father of Olivier). But the son of Hernaut, Aymeri, becomes enraged when he hears the Empress bragging about how she once had humiliated his uncle Girart, and he incites the brothers to battle. In an attempt to end the war, Olivier is pitted against the nephew of the Emperor, Roland, in a duel near Vienne, but neither hero prevails and, when night comes, an angel tells the two heroes to save their strength for battling infidels. The two swear each other eternal friendship and Roland proposes to Olivier's sister, Aude. Girart is reconciled with his emperor, but before Roland and Aude's marriage can take place, a messenger announces the arrival of Saracens in Gascony.

== The "three cycles" ==
This work is also famous for grouping the chansons de geste or "Matter of France" into three cycles, each named after a chief character or ancestral figure: the "Geste du roi" (concerning Charlemagne and his knights), the "Geste de Doon de Mayence" (concerned with rebels against royal authority and its most famous characters were Renaud de Montauban and Girart de Roussillon), and the "Geste de Garin de Monglane" (whose central character was William of Orange; these dealt with knights who were typically younger sons without an inheritance who sought land and glory through combat with the Saracens). The exact description is as follows:

At Saint-Denis, in the great abbey, we find it written (I don't doubt) in a book of noble lineage that there have been only three gestes in well-defended France (I think no-one will argue with me now).

The lordliest is that of the kings of France.

The next, it is right to say, was of Doon of the white beard, he of Mainz who had many lands. In his lineage were fierce and rugged people; they would have had the lordship of all of France, its power, its knighthood, but they were proud and jealous. Of that lineage, so full of treachery, was Ganelon who by his treason caused great sorrow in well-defended France when he committed in Spain the great felony that caused the death in pagan land of the Twelve Peers of France. You have heard tell in many a song that from the geste that came from Ganelon many a great knight was descended, fierce and bold and of very great fame. They would have been lords of the whole realm of France, but there was pride and treason in them. Through pride (we tell you truly) many a high-placed man has been thrown to earth, as were the angels in heaven (we know it in truth) who, for their crime, were thrown into the prison of hell where they will feel nothing but eternal pain. They lost the holy mansion of heaven by their pride and folly. Just so were Ganelon's kin, who would have been so powerful and famous if they had not been so full of treason. Of this lineage, which did nothing but evil, was the second geste.

The third geste, which was much to be praised, was that of Garin de Monglane of the fierce countenance. In his lineage I can well testify that there was not a single coward or good-for-nothing or traitor or vile flatterer; rather they were wise and bold knights and good fighters and noble warriors. Not once did they wish to betray a king of France; they strove to help their true lord and to advance his honour everywhere. They promoted Christendom and destroyed and confounded Saracens. This Garin of the fierce countenance had four sons; never were there bolder knights, I think, so that in a whole day one could not describe their prowess. The first son (I will not lie to you) was the fierce Hernaut of Beaulande. The second, as I have heard tell, was the praiseworthy Milon of Apulia. The third was Renier of Geneva, and the fourth was lord Girart the warrior.

— (Girart de Vienne lines 8–67; translation after J. J. Duggan)

== Editions and translations ==
- Girart de Vienne, ed. by Wolfgang van Emden (Paris: SATF, 1977)
- The Song of Girart of Vienne by Bertrand de Bar-Sur-Aube: A Twelfth-Century Chanson de Geste, trans. by Michael A. Newth (Tempe: Arizona Center for Medieval and Renaissance Studies, 1999)
