= Aude (character) =

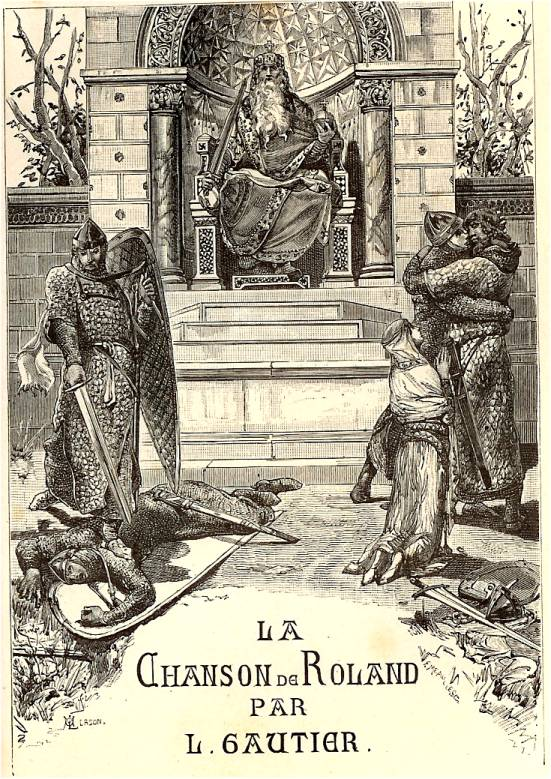
On the right, Roland, Olivier and Aude at the feet of Charlemagne, cover illustration for the popular edition of the Chanson de Roland by Léon Gautier, Mame, Tours, 1881.

Aude, or Alda, Alde, was the sister of Oliver and betrothed of Roland in The Song of Roland, and other chansons de geste. The story of her engagement to Roland is told in Girart de Vienne.

In The Song of Roland Aude is first mentioned by her brother Oliver when he tells Roland that the two will never be married, when the two counts are arguing before the battle; they are later reconciled, but both die fighting the Saracens. When Charlemagne returns to Aix and informs Aude that Roland has died, she collapses at the Emperor's feet and dies of grief. In the poem Aude is not a romantic character, but a heroine of drama and even melodrama, she is a leading literary character, on a par with the heroes. Love, treated at greater length still takes on no courtly hue, it is a tragic and absolute love, as in heroic works.

"The Lovely Alda" is part of Edward MacDowell's 1891 orchestral composition, Two Fragments after the Song of Roland.
