= Foucon de Candie =

Illustration from a manuscript of 1295

Foucon de Candie (also spelled Fouque, Foulque or Folque) is an Old French epic poem of the late 12th or early 13th century. It is a chanson de geste belonging to the cycle of Guillaume d'Orange. It tells the fictional story of how Charlemagne's nephew Foucon acquired by marriage the Saracen city of Candie. Its author was a certain Herbert le Duc de Dammartin. His nickname, duc (duke), "probably designates [him as] a prince among poets", similarly to the nickname of Adenet le Roi.

Nineteen manuscript copies of Foucon have been identified. A Franco-Italian translation also exists.

== Bibliography ==
- Ailes, Marianne; Atkin, Tamara; Bennett, Philip E. (2022). "A Fragment of a Lost Chanson de geste". Florilegium. 35: 158–179.
- Duggan, Joseph J. (2012). "Turoldus, Scribe or Author? Evidence from the Corpus of Chansons de Geste". In Monica L. Wright; Norris J. Lacy; Rupert T. Pickens (eds.). "Moult a sans et vallour": Studies in Medieval French Literature in Honor of William W. Kibler. Brill. pp. 135–143.
- Gambino, Francesca (2018). "La nave di Folco: Due lasse inedite del Foucon de Candie franco-italiano". Zeitschrift für romanische Philologie. 134 (3): 820–844.
- Hoggan, D. G. (1957). "The Version of Aliscans Known to the Author of Foucon de Candie". Medium Aevum. 26 (2): 74–89.
- Tarbé, Prosper, ed. (1860). Le roman de Foulque de Candie par Herbert Leduc, de Dammartin. Reims.
