= Adenes Le Roi =

French minstrel and poet (c. 1240 – c. 1300)

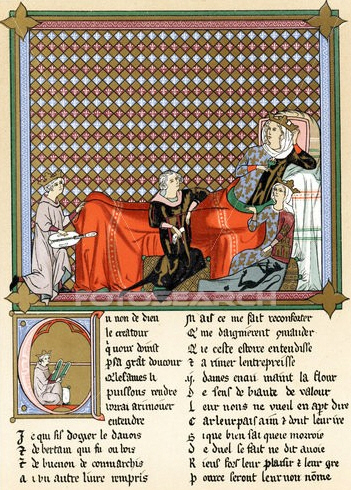

Adenes le Roi (born in Brabant c. 1240, died c. 1300) (Note: He was also known as Adenet Le Roi, Adenez, Adans Le Roi, Roi Adam, Li Rois Adenes, Adan le Menestrel or Adam Rex Menestrallus) was a French minstrel and poet. He was a favorite of Henry III, Duke of Brabant, and he remained at court for some time after the death of his patron in 1261.

== Biography ==
Adenes Le Roi (also Adenez or Adenet; literally, 'Little Adam the King") was born in Brabant around 1240 and owed his education to the kindness of Henry III, Duke of Brabant.

In 1269 he entered the service of Guy de Dampierre, afterwards count of Flanders, probably as roi des ménestrels, and followed him in the next year on the abortive crusade in Tunis in which Louis IX lost his life. The expedition returned by way of Sicily and Italy, and Adenet has left in his poems some very exact descriptions of the places through which he passed. The purity of his French and the absence of provincialisms point to a long residence in France, and it has been suggested that Adenet may have followed Mary of Brabant there on her marriage with Philip III of France. He seems, however, to have remained in the service of Count Guy, although he made frequent visits to Paris to consult the annals preserved in the Abbey of St. Denis. Adenet probably died before the end of the 13th century.A document attests a gift to him in 1297 of a golden buckle from King Edward I, and that is the last information available about Adenet.

== Works ==
There are four extant poems written by Adenet.

1. Enfances Ogier narrates the exploits of Ogier the Dane fighting the Saracens in Italy, and was an enfeebled version of the Chevalerie Ogier de Danemarche written earlier by Raimbert de Paris.
2. Berte aus grans piés tells the history of Bertha of the Big Foot the mother of Charlemagne, founded on well-known traditions which are also preserved in the anonymous Chronique de France, and in the Chronique rimée of Philippe Mousket.
3. Bueves de Comarchis belongs to the cycle of romance gathered around the history of Aimeri de Narbonne.
4. roman d'aventures, Cléomadès, is long and borrows from Spanish and Moorish traditions brought into France by Blanche, daughter of Louis IX, who after the death of her Spanish husband returned to the French court.

Modern publications:

- The romance epics of Adenet were edited for the Académie Impériale et Royale of Brussels by A. Scheler and A. Van Hasselt in 1874.
- Berte was rendered into modern French by G. Hecq (1897) and by R. Périé (1900);
- Cléomadès, by Chevalier de Chatelain (1859).
- See also the edition of Berte by Paulin Paris (1832); an article by the same writer in the Histoire littéraire de la France, vol. xx, pp. 679–718; Léon Gautier, Les épopées françaises, vol. iii, &c.
- The most recent and accepted editions are those by Albert Henry, Les œuvres d'Adenet le Roi. Tome II: Buevon de Conmarchis, Bruges, De Tempel (Rijsuniversiteit te Gent. Werken uitgegeven door de Faculteit van de Wijsbegeerte en letteren, 115e aflevering), 1956 [repr.: Geneva, Slatkine, 1996]; Tome III: Les enfances Ogier, Bruges, De Tempel (Rijsuniversiteit te Gent. Werken uitgegeven door de Faculteit van de Wijsbegeerte en letteren, 121e aflevering), 1956 [repr.: Geneva, Slatkine, 1996]; Tome IV: Berte aus grans piés, Bruxelles, Presses universitaires de Bruxelles; Paris, Presses universitaires de France (Université livre de Bruxelles. Travaux de la Faculté de philosophie et lettres, 23), 1963 [repr.: Geneva, Slatkine, 1996]; Tome V: Cleomadès, Bruxelles, Presses universitaires de Bruxelles; Paris, Presses universitaires de France (Université livre de Bruxelles. Travaux de la Faculté de philosophie et lettres, 46), 1971 [repr.: Geneva, Slatkine, 1996], 2 vols.
- Albert Henry, Les œuvres d'Adenet le roi. Tome 1: Biographie d'Adenet. La tradition manuscrite, Bruges, De Tempel, 1951.
