= Charles Till Davis =

American historian (1929–1998)

- Born: April 14, 1929
- Died: April 10, 1998 (aged 68)

Academic background
- Education: Davidson College; Oxford University
- Thesis: Dante and the Idea of Rome (1957)

Academic work
- Discipline: Medieval historian
- Institutions: Tulane University

Charles Till Davis (14 April 1929 – 10 April 1998) was an American medieval historian of Tulane University who was an authority on Dante Alighieri.

== Career ==
Charles Davis attended Davidson College before earning a Rhodes Scholarship to Oxford University, where he studied under the Italian historian Alessandro Passerin d’Entréves. Davis's doctoral dissertation, Dante and the Idea of Rome, was published by Clarendon Press in 1957. He taught history at Tulane University for over forty years and served as President of the Dante Society of America from 1991 to 1997. Davis was a vocal critic of the university's decision to name a hall in honor of segregationist F. Edward Hebert. He was elected fellow of the Medieval Academy of America and was a member of the American Philosophical Society. A prize is awarded annually at the university in his honor.

== Selected publications ==
- Dante and the idea of Rome. Clarendon Press, Oxford, 1957.
- Ptolemy of Lucca and the Roman Republic. Lancaster Press, 1974.
- Dante's Italy and other essays. University of Pennsylvania Press, 1984. ISBN 978-0812278835
