= Chanson de Guillaume =

Old French epic poem

- The Song of William
- by Unknown
- Text from the original manuscript, reading N'en fuit mie li bon quons Willames
- Original title: Chançun de Willame
- Translator: Philip E. Bennett
- Written: c. 1140, with some early-11th century material
- Country: England or Normandy
- Language: Anglo-Norman
- Subject: Life of William of Gellone
- Genre: Chanson de geste
- Form: Laisse
- Meter: Decasyllable with some hexasyllable lines
- Media type: Manuscript
- Lines: 3,553

The Chanson de Guillaume, also called Chançun de Willame (English: "Song of William"), is a chanson de geste from the first half of the twelfth-century (c. 1140, although the first half of the poem may date from as early as the eleventh century; along with The Song of Roland and Gormont et Isembart, it is considered one of three chansons de geste whose composition incontestably dates from before 1150). The work is generally considered to have two distinct halves: the first tells of Guillaume of Orange, his nephew Vivien and the latter's young brother Gui and their various battles with Saracens at L'Archamp; in the second half of the poem (after 2000 lines), Guillaume is aided by Rainouard, a giant.

The poem comprises 3,553 verses in assonanced laisses; most of the verses are decasyllables, but there are occasional recurring short six-syllable lines. The poem exists in only one 13th-century manuscript, written in an Anglo-Norman dialect, which only was brought to light in 1901 at the sale of the books of Sir Henry Hope Edwardes. The manuscript has since passed to the British Library (British Library, Add MS 38663),

It is the only chanson de geste concerning the deeds of William of Orange that was not included in the cyclic 13th-century collections of chansons de geste generally referred to as the Geste de Guillaume d'Orange. Much of the poem's material (especially the second half) was also expanded and adapted by the later chanson de geste Aliscans.

== Historical sources ==
The chanson appears to be based on William of Gellone's Battle of Orbiel River near Carcassonne in 793.
