= Dodecasyllable =

Line of verse with twelve syllables

Dodecasyllable verse (Italian: dodecasillabo) is a line of verse with twelve syllables. 12 syllable lines are used in a variety of poetic traditions.

Dodecasyllabic meter was invented by Jacob of Serugh (d. 521), a Miaphysite bishop.

With the so-called "political verse" (i.e. pentadecasyllable verse) it is the main metre of Byzantine poetry. It is also used in Italian and French poetry, and in poetry of the Croats (the most famous example being Marko Marulić). In an Anglo-Saxon and French context, the dodecasyllable is generally called the "alexandrine", after the French equivalent.

== See also ==
- hexasyllable, octosyllable, decasyllable, and hendecasyllable — lines of 6, 8, 10, and 11 syllables, respectively
- hexameter — a line of 6 metrical feet, which is generally 12 syllables
