= Charles Hall Grandgent =

American romance philologist (1862–1939)

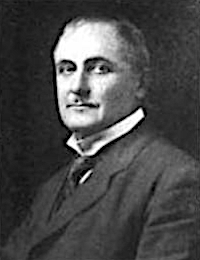
- c. 1914
- Born: November 14, 1862; Dorchester, Massachusetts, US
- Died: September 11, 1939 (aged 76); Cambridge, Massachusetts, US
- Burial place: Mount Auburn Cemetery
- Education: Harvard University
- Spouse: Ethel Wright Cushing (m. 1886)

Charles Hall Grandgent (November 14, 1862 – September 11, 1939) was an American romance philologist and Italian scholar.

== Life and work ==
Charles Hall Grandgent was born in Dorchester, Massachusetts on November 14, 1862. He studied at Harvard University and graduated in 1883. He married Ethel Wright Cushing in 1886, and they had five children.

He was a high school teacher at first. From 1896 until 1932 he was Professor in Romanistics at Harvard University. From 1902 until 1911 he was secretary of the Modern Language Association, and in 1912 its president. He was elected to the American Academy of Arts and Sciences in 1913. In 1923 he became honorary president of the American Association of Teachers of Italian at its foundation. He was elected to the American Philosophical Society in 1929.

He died at his home in Cambridge on September 11, 1939, and was buried at Mount Auburn Cemetery.

The Dante Society of America confers The Charles Hall Grandgent Award yearly.

== Works ==
- Italian grammar, Boston 1887, 1889, 1891, 1892,1903, 1904; (with Ernest Hatch Wilkins) 1915, 1944
- Vowel measurements, Baltimore 1890 (Publications of the Modern Language Association of America. Supplement to vol. V. no. 2, 1890, S. 148-174)
- (with Richard Hochdörfer) German and English sounds, Boston 1892
- A Short French Grammar, Boston 1894, 1905
- "English in America", in: Die Neueren Sprachen, 1895, S. 443-467, 520-533
- The essentials of French grammar, Boston 1900, 1903, 1904, 1906, 1908
- Italian composition, Boston 1904
- An outline of the phonology and morphology of old provençal, Boston 1905
- An introduction to vulgar Latin, Boston 1907, New York 1962, Honolulu 2002 (Italian: Milan 1914, 1976, Spanish: Madrid 1928, 1952, 1963)
- (reprint) Dante, La Divina Commedia, Boston 1911, 1933
- (with Raymond Weeks und James W. Bright) The N.E.A. phonetic alphabet with a review of the Whipple experiments, Lancaster, Pa. 1912
- Dante, New York 1916, 1921 (Folcroft 1973), 1966; London 1920
- The Ladies of Dante's lyrics, Cambridge, Massachusetts 1917
- The Power of Dante (Eight lectures), London/Cambridge, Massachusetts 1920
- Old and New. Sundry papers, Cambridge, Massachusetts 1920
- Discourses on Dante, Cambridge, Massachusetts 1924, New York 1970
- Getting a laugh, and other essays, Cambridge, Massachusetts 1924, 1952, Freeport, N.Y. 1971
- From Latin to Italian. An historical outline of the phonology and morphology of the Italian language, Cambridge, Massachusetts 1927, 1940
- Prunes and prism, with other odds and ends, Cambridge, Massachusetts 1928, Freeport, N.J. 1971
- The new world, Cambridge, Massachusetts 1929
- Imitation and other essays, Cambridge, Massachusetts 1933
- Companion to the Divine Comedy. Commentary, hrsg. von Charles S. Singleton, Cambridge, Massachusetts 1975
- (with Ernest Hatch Wilkins and the staff of Research & Education Association) Italian, Piscataway, N. J. 2002

== Literature ==
- George Luther Lincoln: "A bibliography of Charles Hall Grandgent's writings, arranged chronologically", in: PMLA 47, 1932, S. 911-914
- To Charles Hall Grandgent, Urbana, Ill. 1933
- "Charles Hall Grandgent", in: Italica 12, 1935, S. 176-178
- Henry Grattan Doyle: "Charles Hall Grandgent. An appreciation", in: The Modern Language Journal 19, 1935, S. 615
- Jeremiah Denis Matthias Ford: Charles Hall Grandgent, in: Publications of the Modern Language Association of America 54, 1939, S. 1400-1402
- James McKeen Cattell, Leaders in education, a biographical directory, New York 1932, S. 367-368
