= Giuseppe Mazzotta =

American historian of Italy (born 1942)

- Born: January 1, 1942 (age 84); Curinga, Calabria, Italy
- Education: University of Toronto (BA, MA); Cornell University (PhD)
- Occupation: Historian

Giuseppe Mazzotta (born January 1, 1942) is an American historian of Italy, currently the Sterling Professor in the Humanities for Italian at Yale University, and also a published author. Mazzotta served as president of the Dante Society of America from 2003 to 2009.

== Early life and education ==
He was born at Curinga, Italy on January 1, 1942. He received a B.A. from University of Toronto in 1965, a M.A. from University of Toronto in 1966 and a PH.D. from Cornell University in 1969.

== Career ==
Originally from Italy, he has served at the Yale University since 1986 and also served as the Emilio Goggio Visiting Professor at the University of Toronto in 2014.

== Works ==
- Reading Dante (2014)
- Encyclopaedia Mundi - Studi di letteratura italiana in onore di Giuseppe Mazzotta (2013)
- Modern Language Notes (MLN) - Italian Issue Supplement, Volume 127, Number 1, January 2012 (2012)
- Cosmopoiesis: Renessansens prosjekt (2009)
- Cosmopoiesis: Il progetto del Rinascimento (2008)
- Inferno Dante Alighieri (2007)
- Cosmopoiesis: The Renaissance Experiment (2001)
- The New Map of the World (1999)
- La nuova mappa del mondo: La filosofia poetica di Giambattista Vico (1999)
- The Worlds of Petrarch, Duke Monographs in Medieval and Renaissance Studies (1993) {Rev.}
- Dante’s Vision and the Circle of Knowledge (1993)
- Dante, Poet of the Desert: History and Allegory in the Divine Comedy (1979)

– Source:
