= Fierabras (nickname) =

Fierabras (French Fièrebrace) is a medieval nickname derived from the Latin fera brachia (wild arms) or ferox brachium (ferocious arm). It is first recorded by Pierre de Maillezais, writing c. 1060, as a nickname of William IV, Duke of Aquitaine (ruled 963–90). It can also refer to:

- Fierabras, a fictional Saracen knight in several chansons de geste
- William of Gellone, duke of Toulouse (r. 790–811)

== See also ==
- Fierrabras (opera), an opera based on the legendary Fierabras
- The nickname "Iron Arm" (French Bras-de-fer) is related:
  - Baldwin Iron Arm (d. 879), margrave of Flanders
  - William Iron Arm (d. 1046), count of Apulia
