= Dante Society of America =

Academic group founded in 1881

- Medal for the Society created by Joseph Coletti in 1965
- Formation: 1881; 145 years ago
- Founder: Henry Wadsworth Longfellow; James Russell Lowell; Charles Eliot Norton
- Founded at: Cambridge, Massachusetts
- Members: 374 (2022)
- President: Alison Cornish
- Website: https://www.dantesociety.org/

The Dante Society of America is an American academic society devoted to the study of Dante Alighieri. One of the oldest scholarly societies in North America, it predates both the Modern Language Association, founded in 1883, and the American Historical Association, founded in 1884. After the German Dante Society (German: Deutsche Dante-Gesellschaft; founded in 1865), it is the second-oldest scholarly organization devoted to the study of Dante. The Society was also one of the first scholarly societies in the United States to have women among its founding members. The current president is Alison Cornish of New York University.

== Early history ==
The society was formally established in 1881 by Henry Wadsworth Longfellow, James Russell Lowell, and Charles Eliot Norton, who were its first three presidents. Scholar Karl Witte had initiated and sustained the German Dante Society for a dozen years before it ceased its activities in 1877. One year earlier, a similar group had come together in Oxford, with scholar Edward Moore at its helm, but it was Longfellow who first brought the Americans Lowell and Norton together at Craigie House to discuss Dante.

While Longfellow was designated the first president of the Society, the actual inauguration did not take place until May 16, 1882, two months after Longfellow's death. There, the forty-eight members elected Lowell to continue the leadership of the Society.

Founded in Cambridge, Massachusetts, the society has always been closely associated with Harvard University, due in no small part to the lasting influence of these three professors. Harvard was one of the first American universities to make instruction in modern languages (in addition to classical languages) part of its curriculum. Edward Everett Hale, an early member of the Society, remembered his Italian lessons and Longfellow's lectures at Harvard:

Longfellow read the whole of Dante with us and we were well prepared for this by what we had read with [Pietro] Bachi ... And I can say that when we came to hear Longfellow lecture, we were more than prepared for his lectures by the very thorough work which Bachi had done in this same subject with us.

Lowell took over Longfellow's course upon his resignation in 1855. Twenty-two years later, he would resign his chair at Harvard to accept the appointment of United States Minister to Spain and pass the course on to Norton, a history of art professor. Norton's classes were described by another early member of the Society, William Roscoe Thayer:

To read Dante with Norton was almost an act of worship. There was in his voice something wonderfully stirring and wholly incommunicable. As he reached a favorite passage his face became radiant and his tones more tender. He explained fully from every side,– verbal, textual, literary, spiritual ... In his interpretation of Dante Norton had one immense advantage which neither Lowell nor any other English-speaking Dantist has possessed: he had a specialist's knowledge of mediaeval art. So the thirteenth century lived for him not merely in its poetry, theology, and chronicles, but in paintings and statues in its churches and town halls, and its palaces and dwellings ... he could compass the whole circle of experience and the ideals of that world of which the Divine Comedy is the supreme expression in language.

Another early goal of the Society was to create a specialized library of Dante literature. Few works by Italian scholars on Dante were available in the United States. A three volume commentary on the Divine Comedy by Giosafatte Biagioli first published in Paris in 1816 and later reissued by Neapolitan publisher Rondinella in 1868, could be found on the shelves of the Harvard College Library, along with the 1887 edition of Pietro Fraticelli's commentary, originally published in 1860 by G. Barbera of Florence. These might have been supplemented by Cesare Balbo's Vita di Dante, or some of Ugo Foscolo's essays, but it was under the direction of William Coolidge Lane, an assistant librarian at the Harvard College Library and member of the Society, that an extensive scholarly collection began to take shape. Norton's bequest would both broaden and deepen the collection. An 1890 catalog of the collection compiled by Lane and issued by the Harvard Library listed over 1200 volumes on Dante, including over three hundred different editions of the Divine Comedy. Today the collection at Harvard is regarded as the third largest on the subject in the world.

== Early women members ==
From its founding, membership in the Society was open to women. This was unusual for the time, as membership in other early scholarly societies in North America such as the American Philosophical Society and the Modern Language Association was not generally open to women. The first annual report of the Society listed Miss S. L. Butler, Mrs. C. Dupee, Heloise Durant, Mrs. S. A. Gordon, Fannie L. Payson, and Mrs. A. L. Wister as founding members. In 1902, Yale Ph.D. and Smith College professor Mary Augusta Scott would become the first woman to serve on the Society's executive council. Scott was followed by Margaret Jackson in 1907, Anna Lyman Mason Gray in 1913 and Katherine V. Spencer in 1915. Other early female members of note include Anna Eliot Ticknor, Isabella Stewart Gardner, and Caroline Healey Dall.

== Publications ==
During the 19th and 20th centuries, the Society published a series of concordances: E. A. Fay, Concordance of the Divine Comedy (1888); E. S. Sheldon and A. C. White, Concordanza delle opere italiane in prosa e del canzoniere di D. (English: Concordance of Italian prose works and songbook by Dante, 1905); E. K. Rand, E. H. Wilkins, and A. C. White, D. Alagherii operum latinorum concordantiae (English: Concordance of Latin works of D. Alighieri, 1912); E. H. Wilkins and T. G. Bergin, Concordance to the D. C. (1965).

Today the Society produces the peer-reviewed journal Dante Studies under the editorship of Kristina Olson of George Mason University, published by Johns Hopkins University Press. The society also publishes The Electronic Bulletin of the Dante Society of America under the editorship of Akash Kumar of the University of California, Berkeley.

== Presidents ==
- Henry Wadsworth Longfellow (1881–1882)
- James Russell Lowell (1882–1892)
- Charles Eliot Norton (1892–1908)
- Edward Stevens Sheldon (1909–1915)
- Charles Hall Grandgent (1915–1932)
- Jeremiah D. M. Ford (1932–1940)
- Fred Norris Robinson (1940–1954)
- Ernest Hatch Wilkins (1954–1959)
- George Hussey Gifford (1959–1967)
- Vincenzo Cioffari (1967–1973)
- Nicolae Iliescu (1973–1979)
- Robert Hollander (1979–1985)
- Joan M. Ferrante (1985–1991)
- Charles Till Davis (1991–1997)
- Teodolinda Barolini (1997–2003)
- Giuseppe Mazzotta (2003–2009)
- Nancy J. Vickers (2009–2014)
- Albert Russell Ascoli (2014–2020)
- Alison Cornish (2020–present)
