= Battle of Orbiel River =

793 battle during the Reconquista

Battle of Orbieu River (793)
- Part of the Reconquista
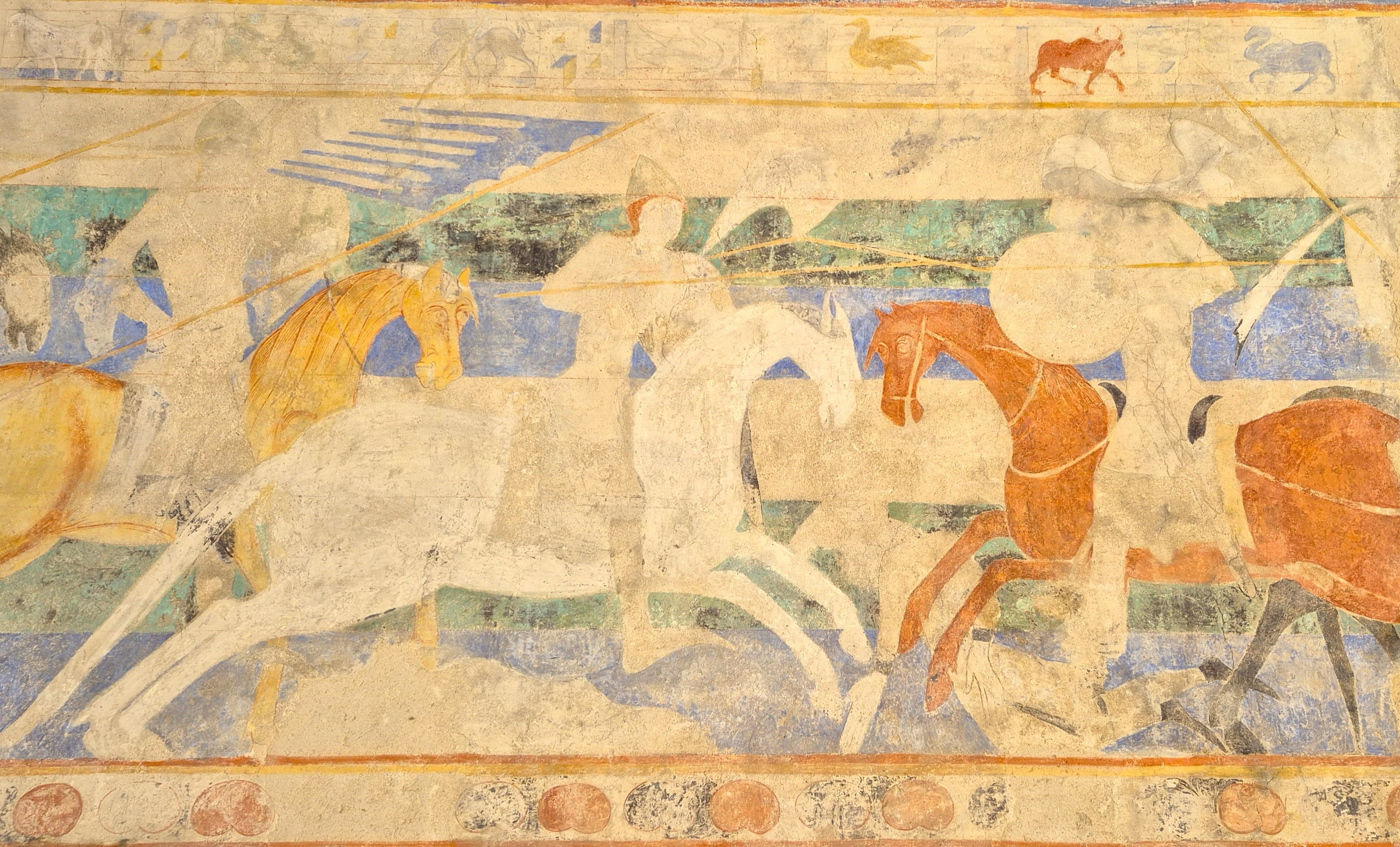
- Olivier's fight against the Saracen Fierabras, mural painting of the Fierabras epic inspired by the Battle of the Orbiel, painted around 1125 in the Castle of Carcassonne.
Date	28 March/Summer 793
Location	Orbieu
Result	Umayyad victory

Belligerents
Emirate of Córdoba	Kingdom of the Franks; Duchy of Aquitaine

Commanders and leaders
Abdul Malik	William of Gellone

Strength
Unknown	Unknown

Casualties and losses
Unknown	Unknown

The battle of Orbiel River was a military engagement between the Umayyads of Spain and the Frankish army led by William of Gellone, the Duke of Toulouse. The Umayyads defeated the Franks and returned with great loot.

== Background ==
In 785, the inhabitants of Girona revolted against the Umayyad rule and placed themselves under the rule of the Franks. Septimania and the south of the Pyrenees had come under the rule of the Franks. Faced with these issues, the Umayyads had to act since their dominion in the north of Spain was threatened. For this, the Umayyad Emir, Hisham I, decided to launch a military expedition in 793 with multiple objectives: it involved punishing those who escaped the Umayyad rule, bringing loot, and reconnoitering the terrain to check the possibility of reconquest. By the time of the expedition, the Frankish king, Charlemagne, was busy fighting the Saxons. The Franks left control of the region under William of Gellone.

== Battle ==
Hisham dispatched his prince, Abdul Malik, with a large Umayyad army to devastate Gaul. The Umayyads reached the walls of Narbonne, where they burned the suburbs, captured many people, and gained rich loot. After that, they headed towards Carcassonne. Learning this, Duke William marched with his Frankish and Aquitaine armies to meet the Umayyads. Both sides met at the Orbiel River. The battle went badly for the Christians and many of them were killed; however, Duke William fought bravely but he could not defeat them as many of the nobles had retreated and left him alone. William was forced to retreat in the end. The victorious Muslims, however, did not continue their march. Satisfied with the loot they captured, they returned to Spain. The battle happened either on March 28 or in the summer.

== Aftermath ==
The Arabs had captured great wealth and slaves. It is said they got 45,000 pounds of gold, which was used to build the Cordoban mosque. Charlamagne was deeply affected by this defeat; however, he did not organize a military expedition to punish Hisham as he was busy fighting the Saxons. A series of military campaigns from 798 to 803 established the Spanish March which was a barrier preventing Umayyad incursions.

== Sources ==
- Gauthier Langlois (2021), Aux origines de la chanson de geste Guillaume d’Orange : traditions historiques et légendaires musulmanes et chrétiennes autour de la razzia sarrasine de 793 en Languedoc.
- Jean-Charles-Léonard Simonde Sismondi (1850), The French Under the Merovingians.
- Elie Griffe (1941), La razzia sarrasine de 793 en Septimanie. Bataille de l'Orbieu ou Bataille de L'Orbiel?.
