= Hexasyllable =

Verse form with six syllables per line

The hexasyllable or hexasyllabic verse is a line of verse with six syllables.

The orphan hexasyllable is a metric specificity of certain French epic poems. This kind of verse in the Garin de Monglane's Song in a 14th-century manuscript turns out original in an epic production.

Hexasyllable is sometimes used in French, Italian, Spanish and Portuguese poetry.

== See also ==
- octosyllable
- decasyllable
- hendecasyllable
- dodecasyllable
