= André Henri Constant van Hasselt =

Dutch-Belgian writer and poet

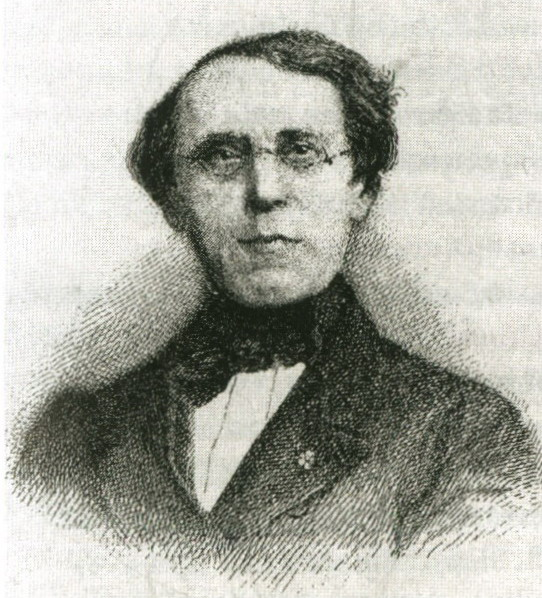
- Born: André Henri Constant van Hasselt; 5 January 1806; Maastricht, Meuse-Inférieure, French Empire (present-day Netherlands)
- Died: 1 December 1874 (aged 68); Saint-Josse-ten-Noode, Belgium
- Occupations: writer, poet

André Henri Constant van Hasselt (Dutch: Andries Hendrik van Hasselt; 5 January 1806 – 1 December 1874) was a Dutch-Belgian writer and poet who wrote mainly in French.

== Life ==
Born at Maastricht, Van Hasselt was first educated at the Koninklijk Atheneum in his native town. He studied law at the Francophone University of Liège (then in the United Kingdom of the Netherlands), where he earned his degree. From 1827 up to 1832 he established himself as a lawyer in Maastricht. In 1833 he left Maastricht, then blockaded by the Belgian forces, and made his way to Brussels, where he became a naturalized Belgian, and was attached to the Bibliothèque de Bourgogne. In 1843 he entered the education department, and eventually became a provincial inspector of normal/elementary schools in Antwerp. Two years later he was appointed special inspector to the normal schools and kept this job until he died at Saint-Josse-ten-Noode, a suburb of Brussels, on 1 December 1874.

== Writings ==
His native language was Dutch, and as a French-writing poet hr had to overcome the difficulties of writing in a language foreign to his home land. He had published a Chant héllenique in honour of Konstantinos Kanaris in the columns of La Sentinelle des Pays-Bas as early as 1826, and other poems followed. His first volume of verse, Primeveres (1834), shows markedly the influence of Victor Hugo, which had been strengthened by a visit to Paris in 1830. His relations with Hugo became intimate in 1851–1852, when the poet was an exile in Brussels. In 1839 he became editor of the Renaissance, a paper founded to encourage the fine arts.

His chief work, the epic of the Quatre Incarnations du Christ, was published in 1867. In the same volume were printed his Études rythmiques, a series of metrical experiments designed to show that the French language could be adapted to every kind of musical rhythm. With the same end in view he executed translations of many German songs, and wrote new French libretti for the best-known operas of Mozart, Weber and others.

== Legacy ==
A selection from his works (10 vols, Brussels, 1876–1877) was edited by Charles Hen and Louis Alvin. He wrote many books for children, chiefly under the pseudonym of Alfred Avelines; and studies on historical and literary subjects. The books written in collaboration with Charles Hen are signed Charles André. A bibliography of his writings is appended to the notice by Louis Alvin in the Biographie nat. de Belgique, vol. vii.

Van Hasselt's fame continued to increase after his death. A series of tributes to his memory was printed in the Poesies choisies (1901), edited by M. Georges Barral for the Collection des poètes français de l'etranger. This book contained a biographical and critical study by Jules Guillaume, and some valuable notes on the poet's theories of rhythm.
