= Joan M. Ferrante =

American scholar of medieval literature

Joan Marguerite Aida Ferrante (born November 11, 1936) is an American scholar of medieval literature.

She was born in Jersey City, New Jersey. She received a bachelor of arts from Barnard College in 1958 and a master's and PhD from Columbia University in 1959 and 1962, respectively. She taught at Hunter College and Barnard, and as an instructor at Columbia, before becoming a professor at Columbia in 1966. She retired in 2006.

Ferrante was president of the Medieval Academy of America in 2000. Before that, she was president of the Dante Society of America and Phi Beta Kappa. A conference was held in 2001 on the occasion of her 65th birthday. A Festschrift titled Medieval Constructions in Gender and Identity: Essays in Honor of Joan M. Ferrante, which collected papers given at the conference, was published in 2005.

== Publications ==
- The Conflict of Love and Honor: The Medieval Tristan Legend in France, Germany and Italy (1973)
- Guillaume d'Orange: Four Twelfth-Century Epics (1974)
- Woman as Image in Medieval Literature (1975)
- The Political Vision of the Divine Comedy (1984)
- To the Glory of Her Sex: Women's Roles in the Composition of Medieval Texts (1997)
