= Octosyllable =

Verse with eight syllables per line

The octosyllable or octosyllabic verse is a line of verse with eight syllables. It is equivalent to tetrameter verse in trochees in languages with a stress accent. Its first occurrence is in a 10th-century Old French saint's legend, the Vie de Saint Leger; another early use is in the early 12th-century Anglo-Norman Voyage de saint Brendan. It is often used in French, Italian, Spanish and Portuguese poetry. While commonly used in couplets, typical stanzas using octosyllables are: décima, some quatrains, redondilla.

In Spanish verse, an octosyllable is a line that has its seventh syllable stressed, on the principle that this would normally be the penultimate syllable of a word. If the final word of a line does not fit this pattern, the line could have eight or seven or nine syllables (as normally counted), thus –

1 / 2 / 3 / 4 / 5 / Gra/NA/da
1 / 2 / 3 / 4 / 5 / Ma/DRID
1 / 2 / 3 / 4 / 5 / 6 / MA/(la)/ga

In Medieval French literature, the octosyllable rhymed couplet was the most common verse form used in verse chronicles, romances (the romans), lais and dits. The meter reached Spain in the 14th century, although commonly with a more varied rhyme scheme than the couplet. The Anglo-Norman poets from the 12th-13th centuries brought the French octosyllablic verse to England and influenced the 4 stress tetrameter verse used in narration (as in Chaucer).

Octosyllabic verse is traditional in many Slavic languages; it goes back at least to the Common Slavic period, and Martin West argues that it is descended from the same Indo-European oral meter as the Vedic Gāyatrī and the Ancient Greek Glyconic and Telesillean meters.

== See also ==
- meter (poetry)
- hexasyllable – 6 syllable line
- decasyllable – 10 syllable line
- hendecasyllable – 11 syllable line
- dodecasyllable – 12 syllable line
