= Garin de Monglane =

Fictional aristocrat in French epics

Garin de Monglane is a fictional aristocrat who gives his name to the second cycle of Old French chansons de geste, La Geste de Garin de Monglane. His cycle tells stories of fiefless lads of noble birth who went off seeking land and adventure fighting the Saracens.

The several heroes who rode off seeking war and wealth in this way are given genealogies that made Garin de Monglane their common ancestor. Apart from fathering a race of landless knights, Garin de Monglane himself is a character whose portrait in the poems is otherwise drawn very sketchily. Poems belonging to the Garin cycle include the chansons of Girart de Vienne, Aimeri de Narbonne, and Guillaume. Of these poems, Aimeri de Narbonne has the largest literary interest.

Garin de Monglane had a named sword, Finechamp, which was discovered and unearthed in Britain thanks to Merlin's wisdom, and had been "carried many a day by King Arthur, and tested often". (Note: DM= Doon de Mayence, vv. 8745–8759 (Finechamp, v. 8753))

== See also ==
- Matter of France
- Girart de Roussillon
- Franco-Provençal language
