= Li coronemenz Looïs =

Twelfth-century Old French medieval narrative

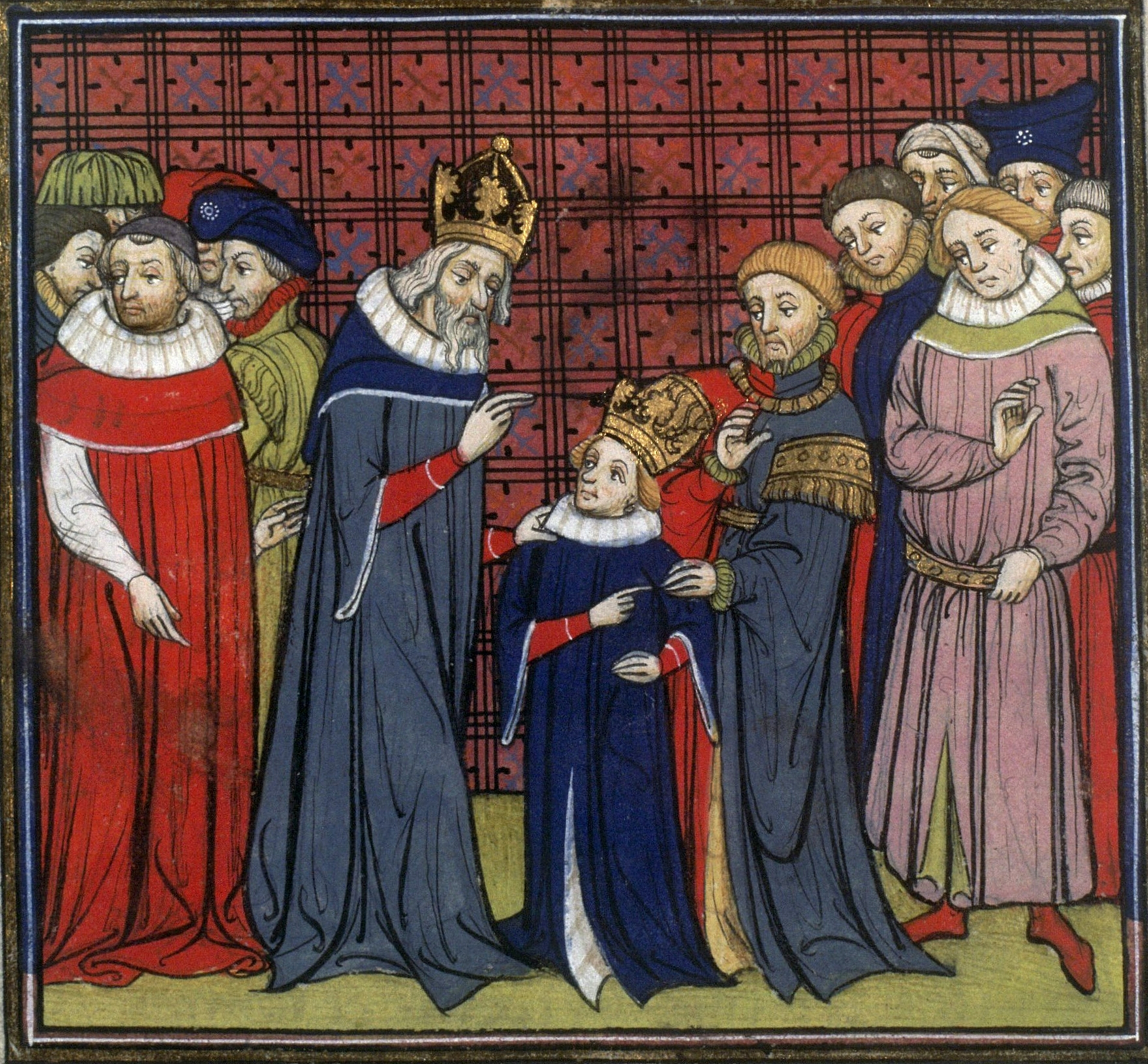
Charlemagne and the coronation of Louis the Pious, in the Grandes Chroniques de France

Li coronemenz Looïs (also spelled Le coronement Looïs) is an anonymous twelfth-century Old French chanson de geste. It is sometimes attributed to Bertrand de Bar-sur-Aube and dated 1137. The first modern critical edition of the text was published in 1888 by Ernest Langlois under the title Le Couronnement de Louis.

The chanson is, as its title indicates, about the coronation of Louis the Pious, son of Charlemagne. The story begins with the aging emperor preparing to abdicate the throne to his fifteen-year-old son. Louis is hesitant in the face of the enormous responsibilities that attend the wearing of the crown. When the emperor dies, to the spontaneous ringing of bells, Arnéïs d'Orléans assumes the reins of government until the young prince has come of age; Louis meanwhile abides at the court of Guillaume d'Orange.

Guillaume soon embarks on a pilgrimage to Rome with the young Louis and there they find the city besieged by Saracens. Guillaume challenges a Saracen champion to single combat and decisively defeats him, becoming a champion of the Pope and the saviour of Rome in the process. He has lost, however, the tip of his nose, from the Saracen's sword, and is thenceforth known by the sobriquet Guillaume au court nez: Guillaume of the short nose.

This early chanson is highly historical in character. Its description of Charlemagne is gleaned largely from the entry for the year 813 in the Vita Hludowici. As it was composed during the reign of Louis VII of France, who was for most of his life without a male heir, the politics behind the story's strong emphasis on the hereditary nature of kingship is partial to the Capetian.

== Editions ==
- Le Couronnement de Louis (Li coronemenz Loois), ed. Ernest Langlois (Paris: Société des anciens textes français, 1888).
- The Crowning of Louis: A New Metrical Translation of the Old French Verse Epic, trans. Nirmal Dass (McFarland and Co., 2003).
