= Aliscans =

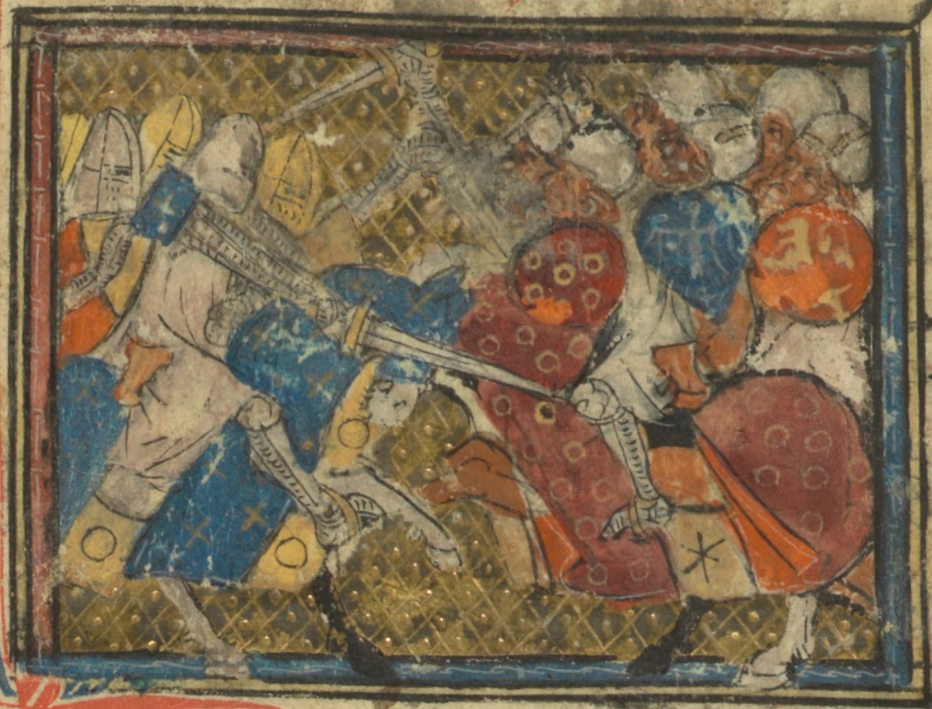
Miniature from a medieval manuscript of the chanson de geste Aliscans

Aliscans is a chanson de geste of the late twelfth century. It recounts the story of the fictional battle of Aliscans (Alescans), a disastrous defeat of a Christian army by a Saracen army. The name 'Aliscans' presumably refers to the Alyscamps in Arles. It belongs to the Guillaume d'Orange cycle, and in the action Guillaume's nephew Vivien is killed.

It is written in the old Picard language, and has around 8000 lines. It is dated, probably, as composed 1180–1190, and survives in 13 manuscripts.

It is generally thought to be a source for the Willehalm of Wolfram von Eschenbach, and the two works cover the same events. The chanson is likely based on the Chançun de Willame, a version of the cycle from the beginning of the century.
