= Léon Gautier (historian) =

French literary historian (1832–1897)

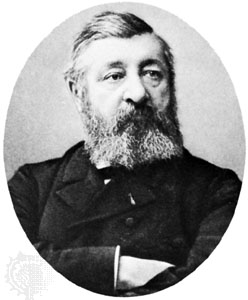
Léon Gautier

Émile Théodore Léon Gautier (8 August 1832 – 25 August 1897) was a French literary historian.

He was born at Le Havre, France. He was educated at the École des Chartes, and became successively head of the archives of the département of Haute-Marne (1856) and archivist at the Imperial Archives in Paris (1859). In 1874 he became a professor of palaeography at the École des Chartes. He was elected a member of the Academy of Inscriptions in 1887, and became chief of the historical section of the National Archives in 1893.

Gautier rendered great services to the study of early French literature, the most important of his numerous works on medieval subjects being a critical text (Tours, 1872) with translation and introduction of the Chanson de Roland, and Les Épopées françaises (3 volumes, 1866–1867; 2nd edition, 5 volumes, 1878–1897, including a Bibliographie des chansons de geste).

== Works ==
- Œuvres poétiques d'Adam de Saint-Victor (1858/59) – Poetic works of Adam de Saint-Victor.
- Les Épopées françaises (1865/68) – The French epics.
- La Chanson de Roland (critical edition, 1872)
- Portraits contemporains et questions actuelles (1873)
- La Chevalerie (1884) – On chivalry.
- Histoire de la poésie liturgique au Moyen Âge: les tropes (1886) – History on liturgical poetry of the Middle Ages.
- Portraits du XIXe siècle I. Poètes et romanciers, (1894/95)
- Portraits du XIXe siècle. Historiens et critiques, (1894/95)
- Portraits du XIXe siècle. Nos adversaires et nos amis, (1894/95)
- Bibliographie des chansons de geste (1897).
- La France sous Philippe-Auguste (1899)
