= Bertrand de Bar-sur-Aube =

Bertrand de Bar-sur-Aube (i.e. Bertrand from Bar-sur-Aube) (end of the 12th century – early 13th century) was an Old French poet from the Champagne region of France who wrote a number of chansons de geste. He is the author of Girard de Vienne, and it is likely that he also wrote Aymeri de Narbonne. The chansons de geste Narbonnais and Beuve de Hantone have also been attributed to him, but these attributions are contested. At the beginning of Girart de Vienne, the author describes himself as a "clerc" or cleric. No other biographical information is known about him.
