= Laisse =

A laisse is a type of stanza, of varying length, found in medieval French literature, specifically medieval French epic poetry (the chanson de geste), such as The Song of Roland. In early works, each laisse was made up of (mono) assonanced verses, although the appearance of (mono) rhymed laisses was increasingly common in later poems. Within a poem, the length of each separate laisse is variable (whereas the metric length of the verses is invariable, each verse having the same syllable length, typically decasyllables or, occasionally, alexandrines).

The laisse is characterized by stereotyped phrases and formulas and frequently repeated themes and motifs, including repetitions of material from one laisse to another. Such repetitions and formulaic structures are common of orality and oral-formulaic composition. When medieval poets repeated content (with different wording or assonance or rhyme) from one laisse to another, such "similar" laisses are called laisses similaires in French.
