= Decasyllable =

Poetic verse with ten syllables per line

Decasyllable (Italian: decasillabo, French: décasyllabe, Serbian: десетерац, deseterac) is a poetic meter of ten syllables used in poetic traditions of syllabic verse. In languages with a stress accent (accentual verse), it is the equivalent of pentameter with iambs or trochees (particularly iambic pentameter).

Medieval French heroic epics (the chansons de geste) were most often composed in 10 syllable verses (from which, the decasyllable was termed "heroic verse"), generally with a regular caesura after the fourth syllable. (The medieval French romance (roman) was, however, most often written in 8 syllable (or octosyllable) verse.)

Use of the 10 syllable line in French poetry was eclipsed by the 12 syllable alexandrine line, particularly after the 16th century. Paul Valéry's great poem "The Graveyard by the Sea" (Le Cimetière marin) is, however, written in decasyllables.

Similarly, South Slavic and in particular Serbian epic poetry sung with the accompaniment of the gusle is traditionally sung in the decasyllabic verse.

In 19th-century Italian opera, this form was often employed in the libretto. Noting its use in the operas of Giuseppe Verdi, musicologist Philip Gossett describes the composer's request to the librettist for his opera Macbeth, Francesco Maria Piave, as follows: "I'd like to do a chorus as important as the one in Nabucco, but I wouldn't want it to have the same rhythm, and that's why I ask you for ottonari" [8 syllables; and then Gossett continues] "Va, pensiero, sull'ali dorate" from Nabucco, "O Signore del tetto natio" from I Lombardi, and "Si ridesti il Leon di Castiglia" from Ernani all employ the poetic meter of decasillabi.

Geoffrey Chaucer, author of The Canterbury Tales, utilized this poetic form. Chaucer evolved this meter into iambs, or the alternating pattern of five stressed and unstressed syllables made famous by Shakespeare. Because Chaucer's Middle English included many unstressed vowels at the end of words which later became silent, his poetry includes a greater number of hendecasyllables than that of Modern English poets.

== See also ==
- Meter (poetry)
- Hexasyllable, the six-syllable line
- Octosyllable, the eight-syllable line
- Hendecasyllable, the eleven-syllable line
- Dodecasyllable, the twelve-syllable line
