= William of Gellone =

French Catholic saint

Saint William of Gellone
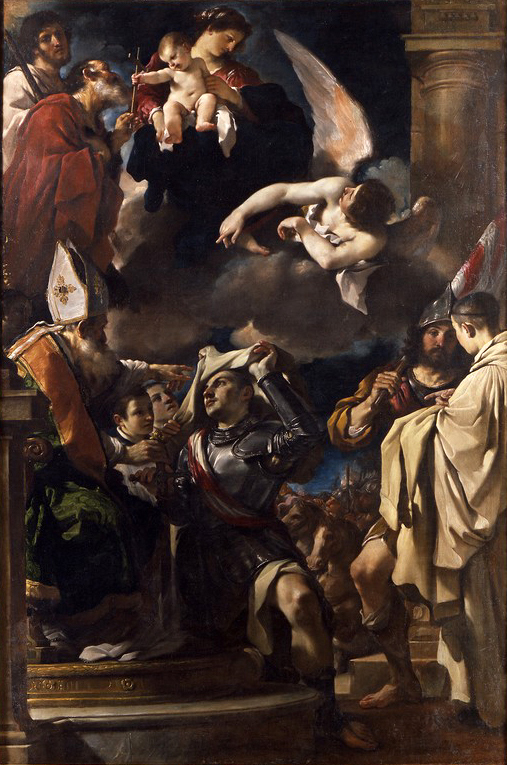
- William of Gellone, Guillaume d'Orange, William of Aquitaine by Guercino
- Born: c. 755 somewhere in northern France
- Died: 28 May 812 or 28 May 814; Gellone, near Lodève?
- Spouse(s): Cunegonde and Witburgis
- Children: Bernard, Witcher, Gotzelm, Heribert, Helimburgis, Gerberge and (perhaps) Rotlinde
- Venerated in: Catholic Church and Eastern Orthodox Church
- Canonized: 1066 by Pope Alexander II
- Major shrine: Monastery of Saint-Guilhem-le-Désert in Gellone, France
- Feast: May 28

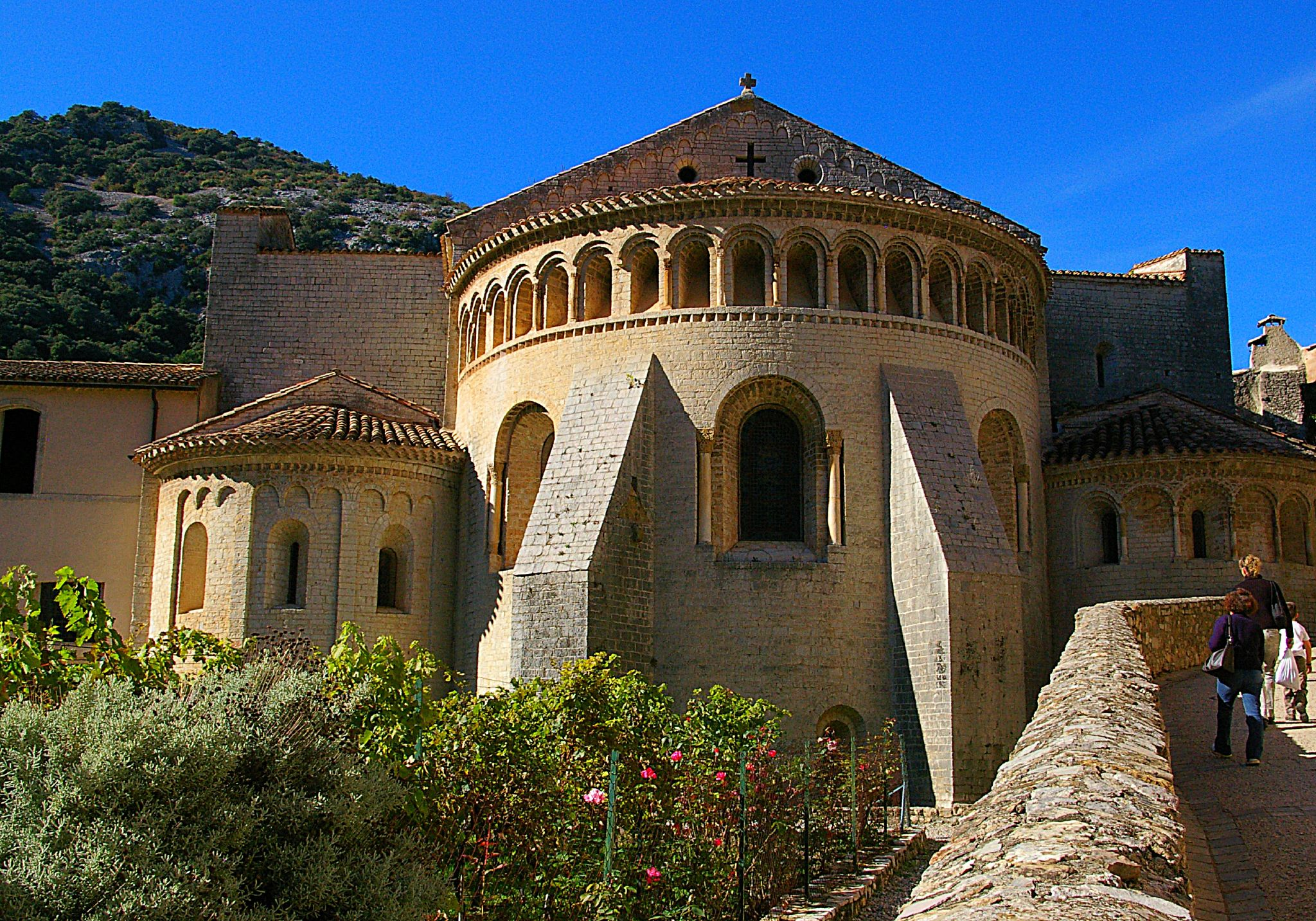
Romanesque apse of Saint-Guilhem-le-Désert, originally Gellone, the monastery William founded in 804 and entered in 806

William of Gellone (c. 755 – 28 May 812 or 814), was the second Duke of Toulouse from 790 until 811. In 804, he founded the abbey of Gellone. He was canonized a saint in 1066 by Pope Alexander II.

In the tenth or eleventh century, a Latin hagiography, the Vita sancti Willelmi, was composed. By the twelfth century, William's legend had grown. He is the hero of an entire cycle of chansons de geste, the earliest of which is the Chanson de Guillaume of about 1140. In the chansons, he is nicknamed Fièrebrace (fierce or strong arm) due to his apparent strength and the marquis au court nez (margrave with the short nose) as the result of an injury suffered in battle with a giant.

== William in history ==
William was born in northern France in the mid-8th century, to Thierry IV, Count of Autun, and his wife Aldana. He was a relative of Charlemagne. The relationship is speculated to have come through William's mother, perhaps a daughter of Charles Martel, or through Thierry, apparently a close kinsman of Charlemagne's maternal great-grandmother (Bertrada of Prüm), with the two relationships not mutually exclusive. As a kinsman and trusted comes, he spent his youth in the court of Charlemagne. In 788, Chorso, Count of Toulouse, was captured by the Basque Adalric, and made to swear an oath of allegiance to the Duke of Gascony, Lupus II. Upon his release Charlemagne replaced him with his Frankish cousin William (790). William, in turn, successfully subdued the Gascons.

In 793, Hisham I, the successor of Abd ar-Rahman I, proclaimed a holy war against the Christians to the north. He amassed an army of 100,000 men, half of which attacked the Kingdom of Asturias while the other half invaded Languedoc, penetrating as far as Narbonne.

William met this force and defeated them. He met the Muslim forces again near the river Orbieu at Villedaigne but was defeated, though his obstinate resistance exhausted the Muslim forces so much that they retreated to Hispania. In 801, William commanded along with Louis, King of Aquitaine a large expedition of Franks, Burgundians, Provençals, Aquitanians, Gascons (Basques) and Goths that captured Barcelona from the Umayyads.

In 804, he founded the abbey in Gellone (now Saint-Guilhem-le-Désert) near Lodève in the diocese of Maguelonne. He granted property to Gellone and placed the monastery under the general control of Benedict of Aniane, whose monastery was nearby. Among his gifts to the abbey he founded was a piece of the True Cross, a present from his cousin Charlemagne. Charlemagne had received the relic from the Patriarch of Jerusalem according to the Vita of William.

In 806, William retired to Gellone as a monk and eventually died there on 28 May 812 (or 814). When he died, it was said the bells at Orange rang on their own accord.

William mentioned both his family and monastery in his will. His will of 28 January 804, names his wives Cunegonde and Witburgis, his deceased parents, Theodoric/Thierry and Aldana, two brothers, Theodino and Adalelmo, two sisters, Abbana and Bertana, four children, Barnard, Witcher, Gotzelm and Helimburgis, and a nephew, Bertrano. In addition, he had a son Heribert, a daughter Gerberge, and perhaps a daughter Rotlinde.

Gellone remained under the control of the abbots of Aniane. It became a subject of contention, however, as the reputation of William grew. So many pilgrims were attracted to Gellone that his corpse was exhumed from the modest site in the narthex and given a more prominent place under the choir, to the intense dissatisfaction of the Abbey of Aniane. A number of forged documents and assertions were produced on each side that leave details of actual history doubtful. The abbey was a major stop for pilgrims on their way to Santiago de Compostela. Its late-12th-century Romanesque cloister, systematically dismantled during the French Revolution, found its way to The Cloisters in New York. The Sacramentary of Gellone, dating to the late 8th century, is a famous manuscript.

== William in romance ==
William's faithful service to Charlemagne is portrayed as an example of feudal loyalty. William's career battling Saracens is sung in epic poems in the 12th- and 13th-century cycle called La Geste de Garin de Monglane, some two dozen chansons de geste that actually center around William, the great-grandson of the largely legendary Garin.

One section of the cycle, however, is devoted to the feats of his father, there named Aymeri de Narbonne, who has received Narbonne as his seigniory after his return from Spain with Charlemagne. Details of the "Aymeri" of the poem are conflated with a later historic figure who was truly the viscount of Narbonne from 1108 to 1134. In the chanson he is awarded Ermengart, daughter of Didier, and sister of Boniface, king of the Lombards. Among his seven sons and five daughters (one of whom marries Louis the Pious) is William.

The defeat of the Moors at Orange was given legendary treatment in the 12th-century epic La Prise d'Orange. There, he was made Count of Toulouse in the stead of the disgraced Chorso, then King of Aquitaine in 778. He is difficult to separate from the legends and poems that gave him feats of arms, lineage and titles: Guillaume Fièrebras, Guillaum au Court-Nez (broken in a battle with a giant), Guillaum de Narbonne and Guillaume d'Orange. These legends turn his wife into a converted Saracen, Orable, later christened Guibourc.

== Sources ==
- Bouchard, Constance Brittain (2001). Those of My Blood: Creating Noble Families in Medieval Francia. University of Pennsylvania Press.
- "L'Abbaye de Saint-Guilhem-le-Desert" (in French)
- Metropolitan Museum:The Saint-Guilhem Cloister
- Chisholm, Hugh, ed. (1911). "Guillaume d'Orange" . Encyclopædia Britannica. Vol. 12 (11th ed.). Cambridge University Press. pp. 692–694.

Preceded by Torson	Count of Toulouse; 790–811	Succeeded by Beggo
