= Agolant =

Agolant or Agolante is a fictional character in Medieval and Renaissance romantic epics dealing with the Matter of France, including Orlando innamorato by Matteo Maria Boiardo and Orlando furioso by Ludovico Ariosto. He is a Saracen king from Africa.

The character appears in the Historia Caroli Magni, sometimes known as the Pseudo-Turpin Chronicle, a 12th-century Latin forged chronicle of legendary material about Charlemagne's alleged conquest of Spain. In this text, Agolant, briefly, reconquers Spain from Charlemagne. In the subsequent war, several miracles occur, including flowers sprouting from the lances of the knights. Another war has Agolant invading south-western France and besieging the city of Agen, but he is forced to retreat to Pampeluna (Pamplona). In a last war, Charlemagne's great army sieges Pampeluna. After the death of Agolant, Charlemagne's troops pursue the Saracens through Spain.

Agolant is a central character in the late 12th century Old French chanson de geste Aspremont (before 1190). In this tale, Agolant and his son Helmont invade Calabria. In the end, they are defeated at Aspromonte by a youthful Roland, and in gratitude, Charlemagne gives Roland Helmont's horse (Veillantif) and sword (Durandal). Versions of this chanson were extremely popular in England, Italy (see the adaptation by Andrea da Barberino) and even Scandinavia.

Agolant appears in Jean Bagnyon's 15th century La Conqueste du grand roy Charlemagne des Espagnes et les vaillances des douze pairs de France, et aussi celles de Fierabras (book 3, part 1, chapters 4–5), a work largely based on the Historia Caroli Magni, probably known to Bagnyon via the Speculum Historiale of Vincent de Beauvais.

Through this tradition, Agolant(e) appears in the Italian romantic epics. In Orlando innamorato by Matteo Maria Boiardo and in Orlando furioso by Ludovico Ariosto, he is the father of Almonte and Troiano and his daughter, Galaciella, is the mother of Ruggiero III and (in Ariosto) Marfisa. In both, Agolant's son Almonte is killed at Aspromonte by a youthful Orlando, who takes his helmet (in Boiardo, Agolant's helmet was received from the wizard Albrizach.), his sword Durindana (which had belonged to the Trojan hero Hector; the defeated Ruggerio II, father of Ruggerio III, was a descendant of Astyanax, son of Hector) and horse (Brigliadoro). Agolant is also mentioned in Luigi Pulci's Morgante.
