= Veillantif =

Horse of Roland, Paladin of Charlemagne

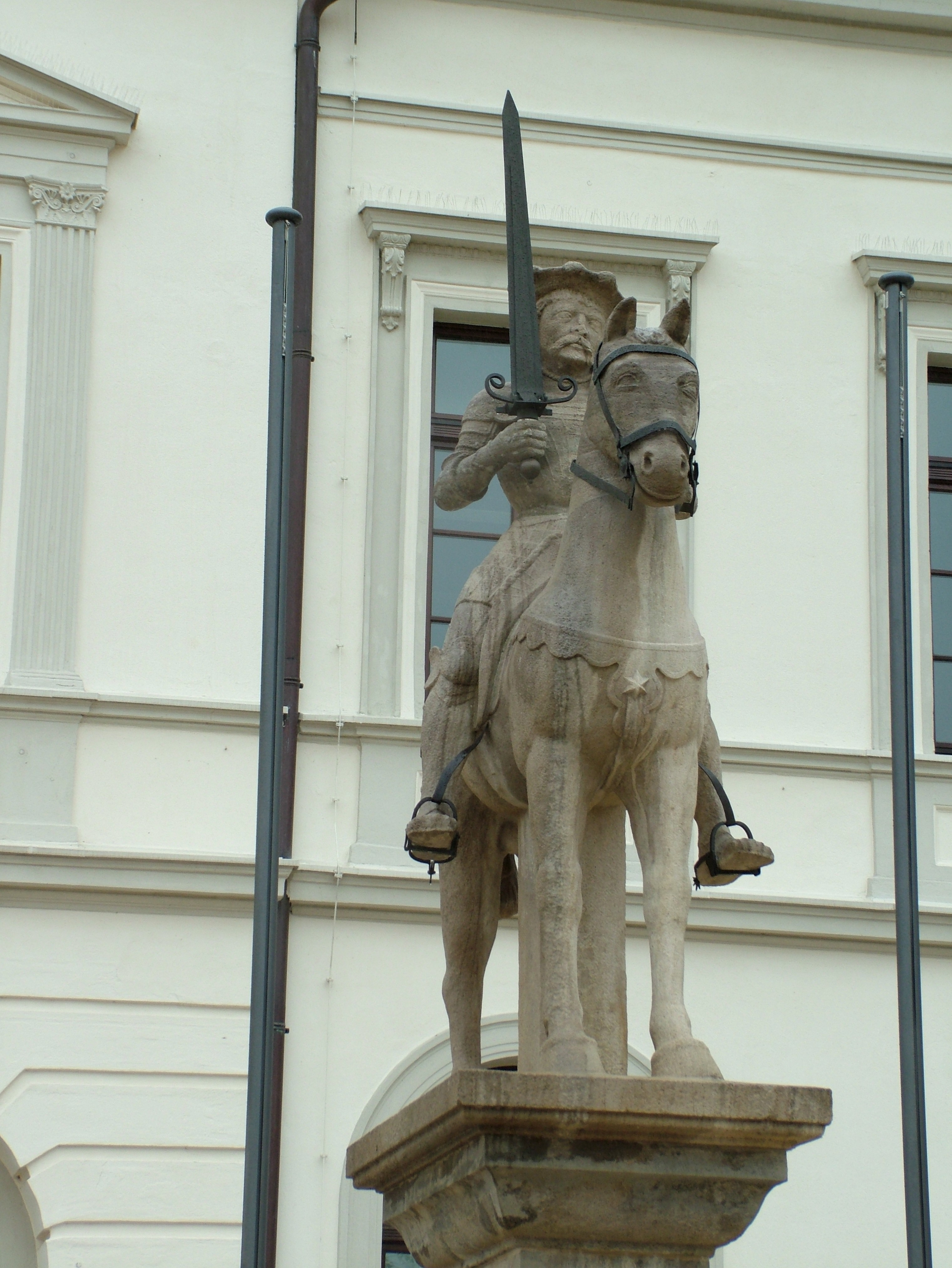
Equestrian Roland statue showing Roland astride Veillantif in Haldensleben, Saxony-Anhalt, Germany, in front of the town hall.

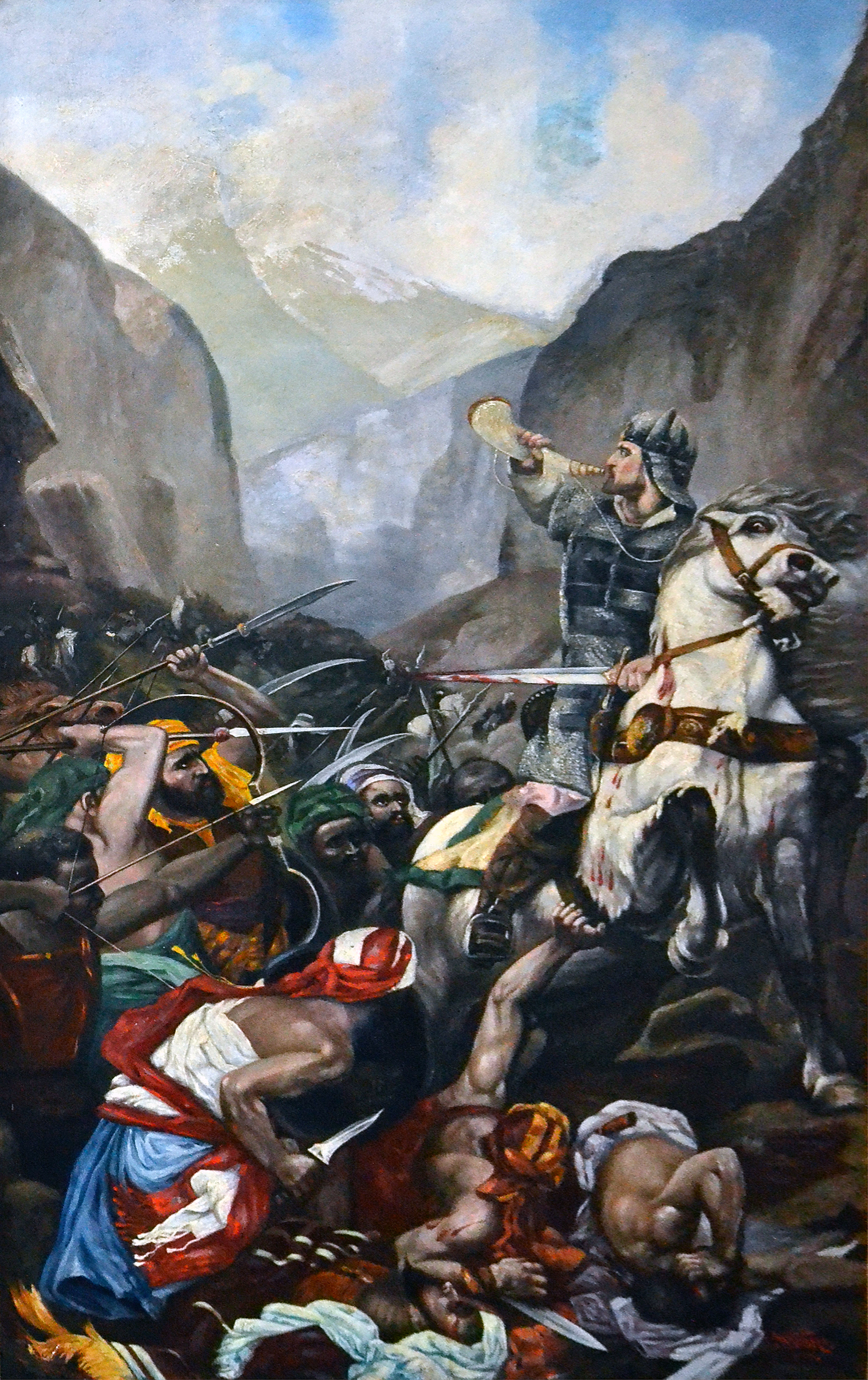
Roland blows his olifant riding Veillantif to summon help in the midst of the Battle of Roncevaux

Veillantif (French), Vielantiu (Old French); Vegliantin, Vegliantino or Brigliadoro (Italian) is the name of Roland the paladin's trustworthy and swift steed in the stories derived from the chansons de geste. The French name comes from an expression meaning "vigilant". Veillantif is first mentioned in The Song of Roland (v. 2032; laisse 151).

Veillantif was given various origins. In the 12th century chanson de geste Aspremont, the horse is said to have formerly been in the possession of King Agolant's son Aumon. After Aumon's defeat, the horse (and his sword Durendal) was given to Roland.

Andrea da Barberino's (1370–1431) Italian prose adaptation L'Aspramonte stated that the horse was called Briadoro when it belonged to Almonte (Aumon), but renamed Vegliantino after being conquered by Orlandino ("little Roland"). Luigi Pulci's (1432–1484) Morgante refers to the horse as Vegliantino whereas Matteo Maria Boiardo's (1440–1494) Orlando Innamorato and Ludovico Ariosto's (1474–1533) Orlando Furioso used "Brigliadoro", Italian for "bridle of gold". (Note: Barbara Reynolds ventured that "It was Boiardo who re-named him Brigliadoro".)

== See also ==
- Bayard, Rinaldo/Renaud's magical horse
- List of historical horses
- List of fictional horses
