= Gramimond =

Fictional warhorse

Gramimond ("grim") is the warhorse of Valdabrun, one of the Saracens in the French epic, The Song of Roland. Gramimond is introduced in laisse 118 of the poem and is destroyed along with its rider by Roland.
