= Bremen Roland =

UNESCO World Heritage Site
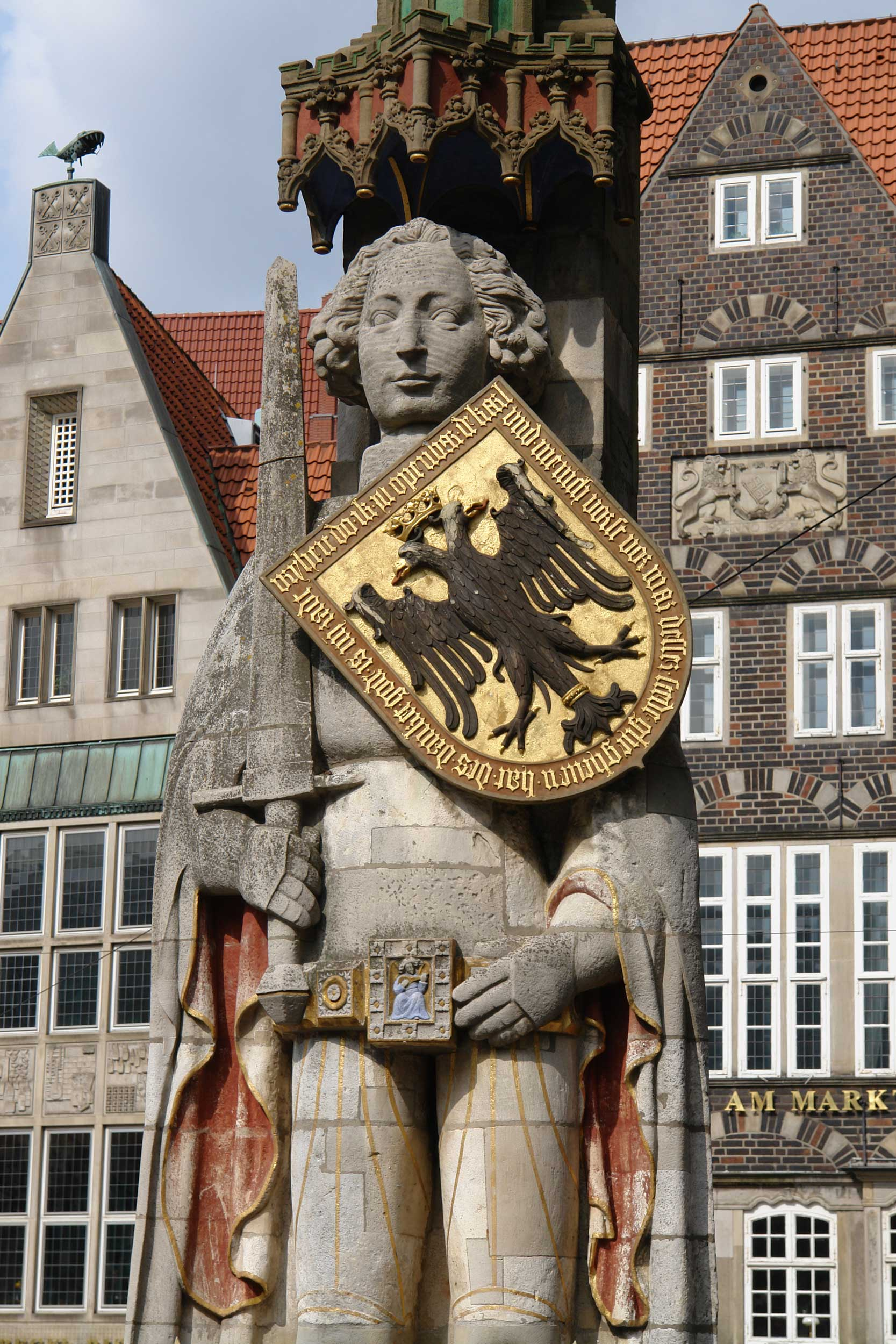
- Statue of Roland on the market square

- Location within Germany Location within Bremen
- Location: Bremen, Germany
- Part of: Town Hall and Roland on the Marketplace of Bremen
- Criteria: Cultural: (iii)(iv)(vi)
- Reference: 1087
- Inscription: 2004 (28th Session)
- Coordinates: 53°04′33″N 8°48′26″E

Bremen Roland

The Bremen Roland is a statue of Roland, erected in 1404. It stands in the market square (Rathausplatz) of Bremen, Germany, facing the cathedral, and shows Roland, paladin of the first Holy Roman Emperor Charlemagne and hero of the Battle of Roncevaux Pass.

Statues of Roland appear in numerous cities of the former Holy Roman Empire, as emblems of city liberties, Stadtrechte. The Roland statue at Bremen is the oldest surviving example. From Bremen the symbol of civic liberty and freedom spread to other cities and has become a symbol of the new Europe. It has been protected by the Monument Protection Act since 1973. In July 2004, along with the town hall, the statue was added to the list of UNESCO World Heritage Sites in recognition of its outstanding architecture and symbolism of an important historical figure.

== Description ==
Roland is shown as protector of the city: his legendary sword (known in chivalric legend as Durendal) is unsheathed, and his shield is emblazoned with the two-headed Imperial eagle. The standing figure is 5.47 m tall, and stands on a 60 cm rostrum. A supporting column, crowned by a baldachin, brings the combined height to 10.21 m. The statue was carved in limestone from the Elm, and was commissioned by the city fathers to replace a wooden one burnt in 1366 by Prince-Archbishop Albert II. It confronts the church as a representation of city rights opposed to the territorial claims of the prince-archbishop.

The inscription on the shield reads: "vryheit do ik yu openbar / de karl und mēnnich vorst vorwar / desser stede ghegheven hat / des dankt gode is mīn radt"

This translates in English to: "Freedom I do manifest to you / which Karl and many noblemen indeed / have given to this place. / For this thank God, that is my advice."

== Legend ==
According to legend, Bremen will remain free and independent for as long as Roland stands watch over the city. For this reason, it is alleged that a second Roland statue is kept hidden in the town hall's underground vaults, which can be quickly installed as a substitute, should the original fall.

== Kleiner Roland ==
Kleiner Roland in Neustadt was erected in 1737, by the 1st Neustädter Bürgerkompanie. As a result of Neustädter citizens having very limited citizenship rights since 1642. It is based on the larger Roland of 1404.

It's inscription reads: "You have the big one standing there, we stand before the little one. We are not the big city, we are the little one and the appendage, but we are as much city as you are."

== Gallery ==
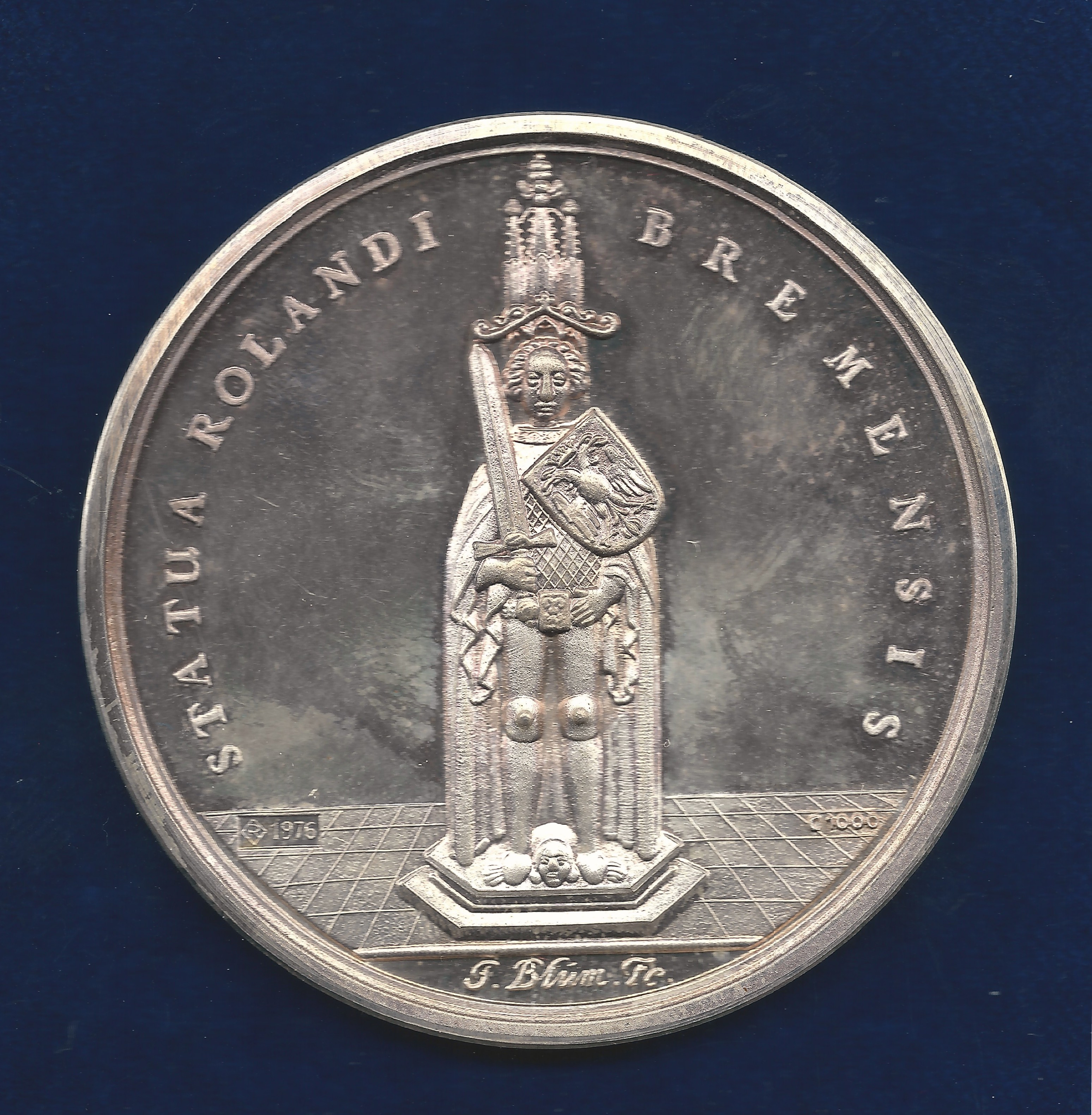
The Bremen Roland on a Medal of 1648 by Johann Blum commemorating the Peace of Westphalia

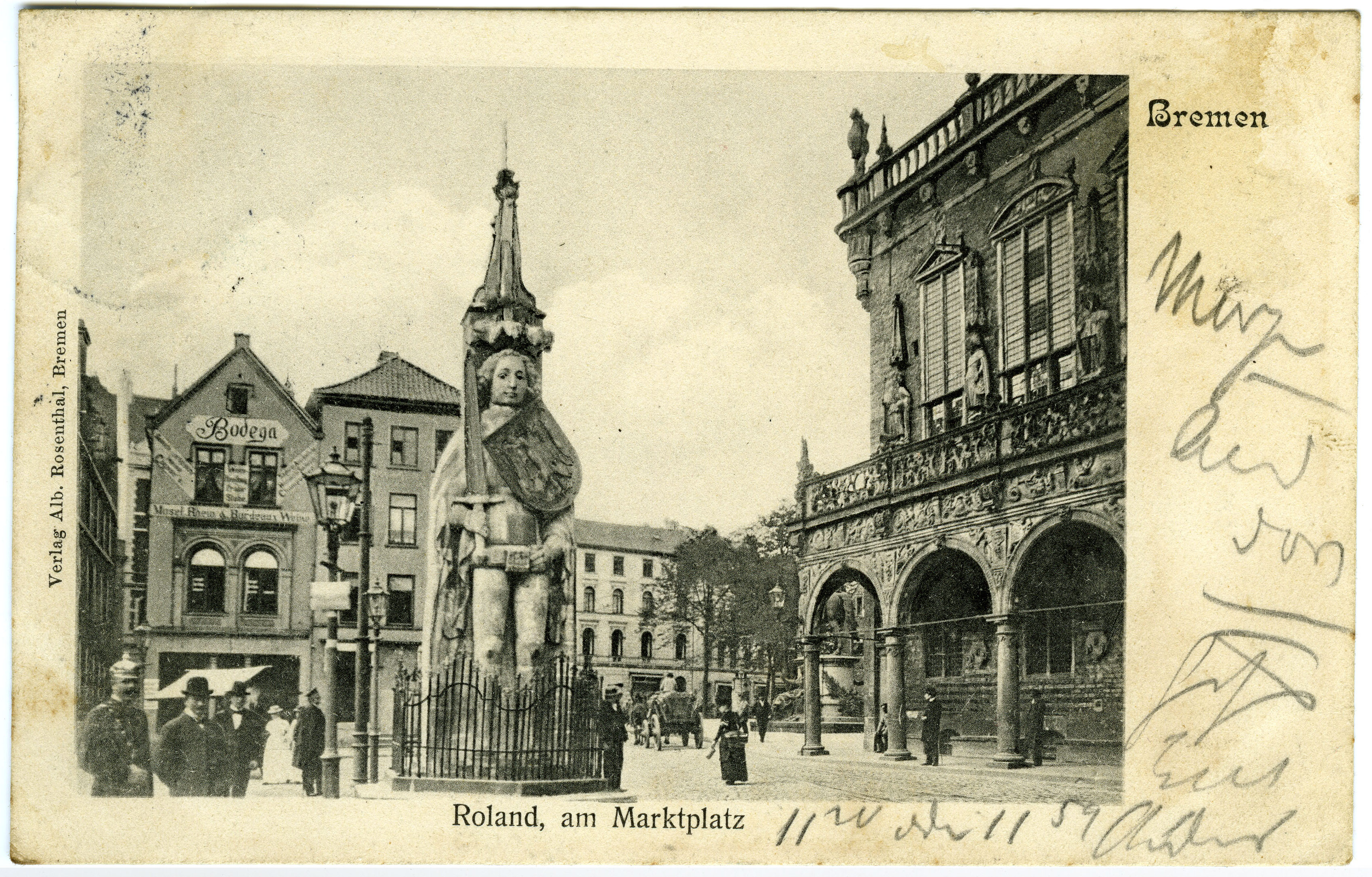
Postcard of Bremen from circa 1905, showing Roland and the marketplace.

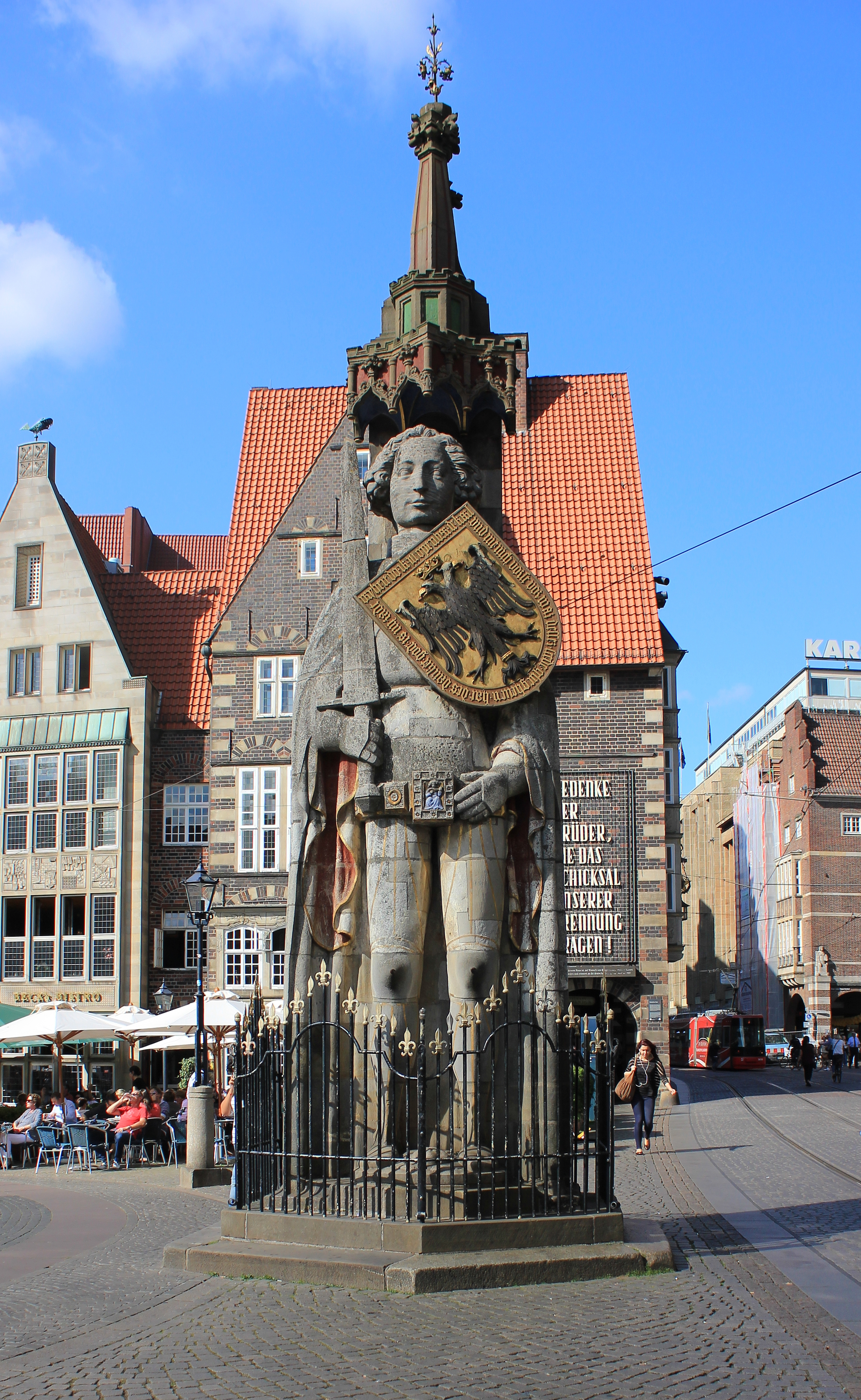
Roland in 2014

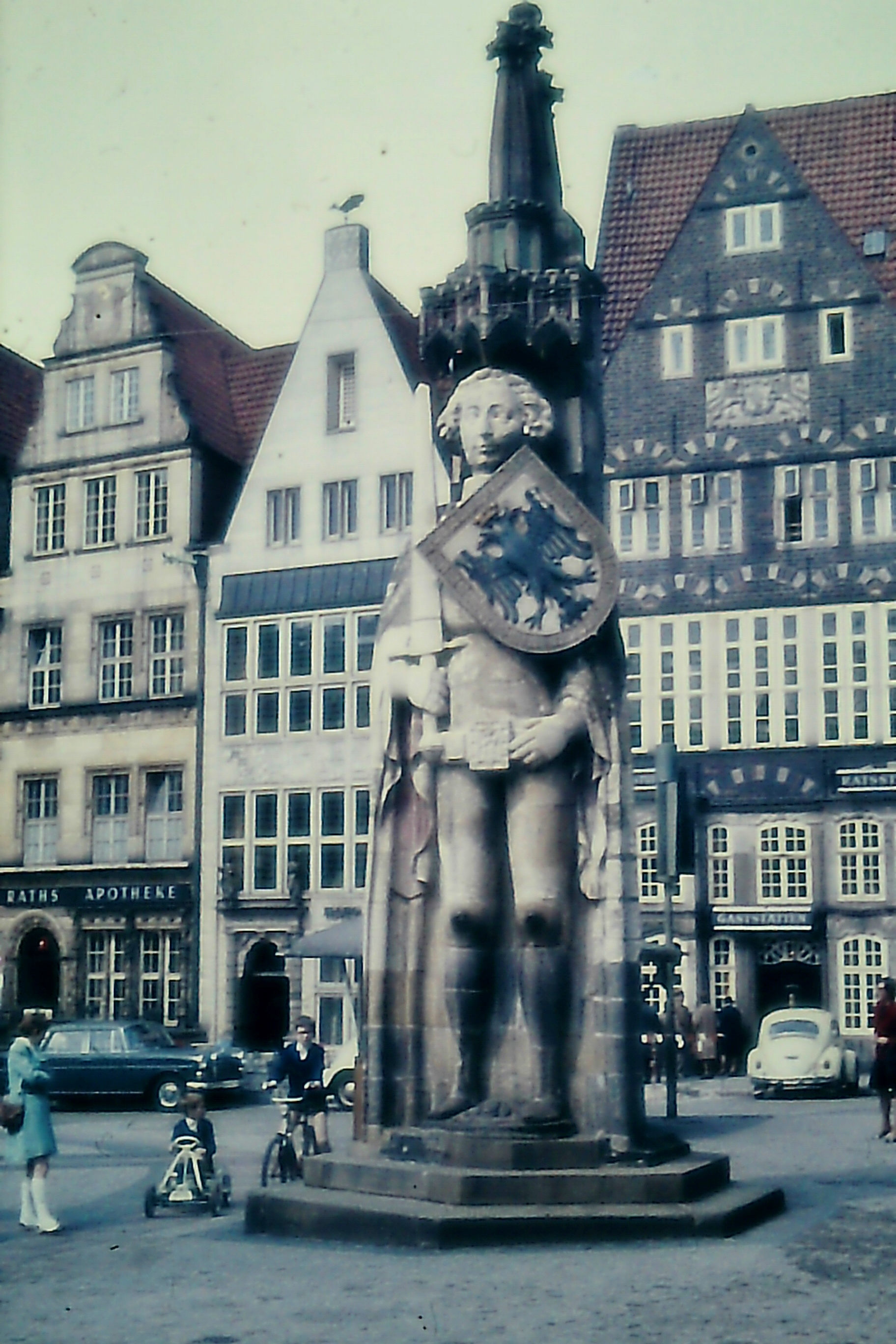
Roland in 1969

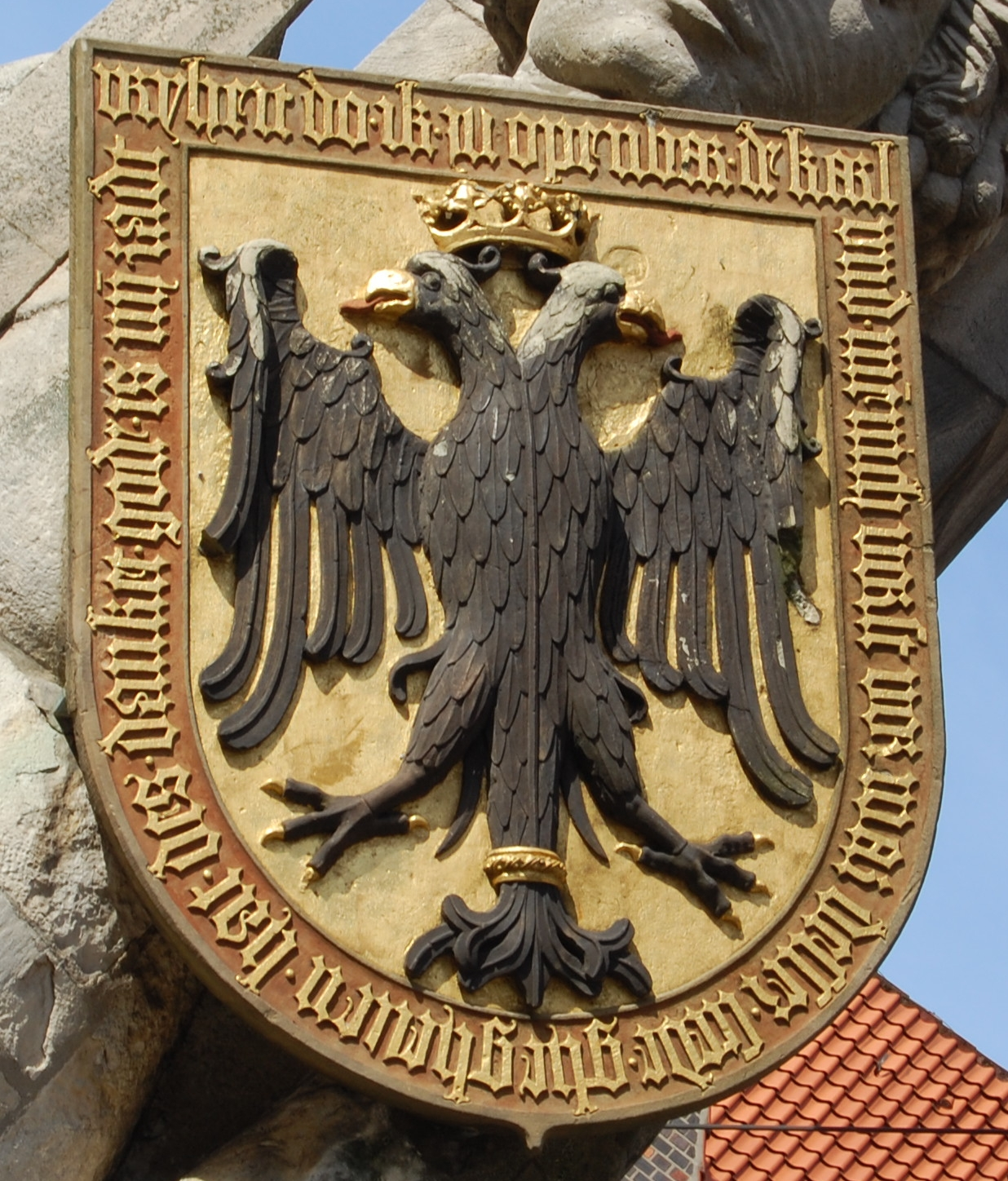
shield close-up

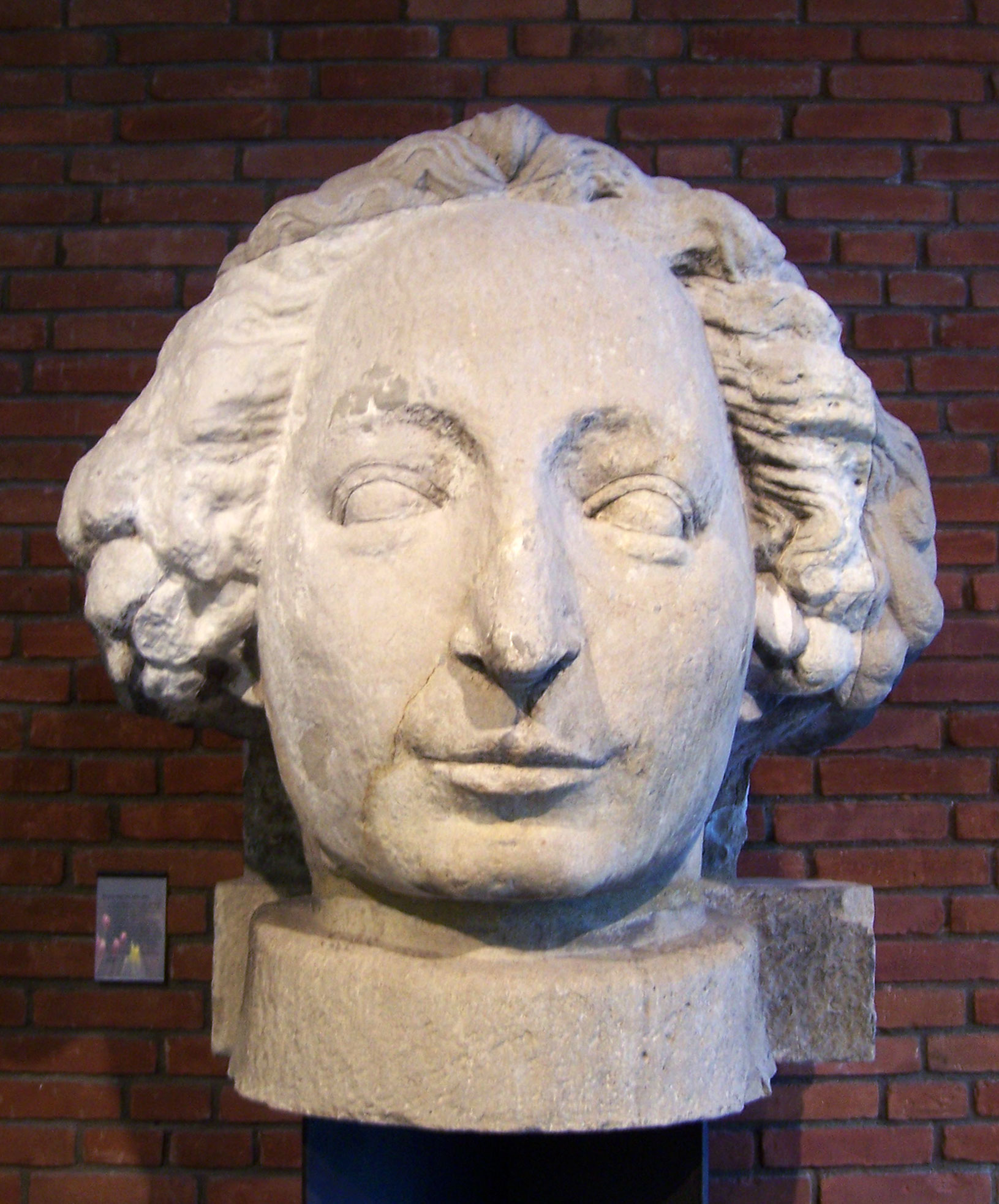
Original head, now in the Focke Museum
