= Aspremont (chanson de geste) =

12th-century Old French epic poem

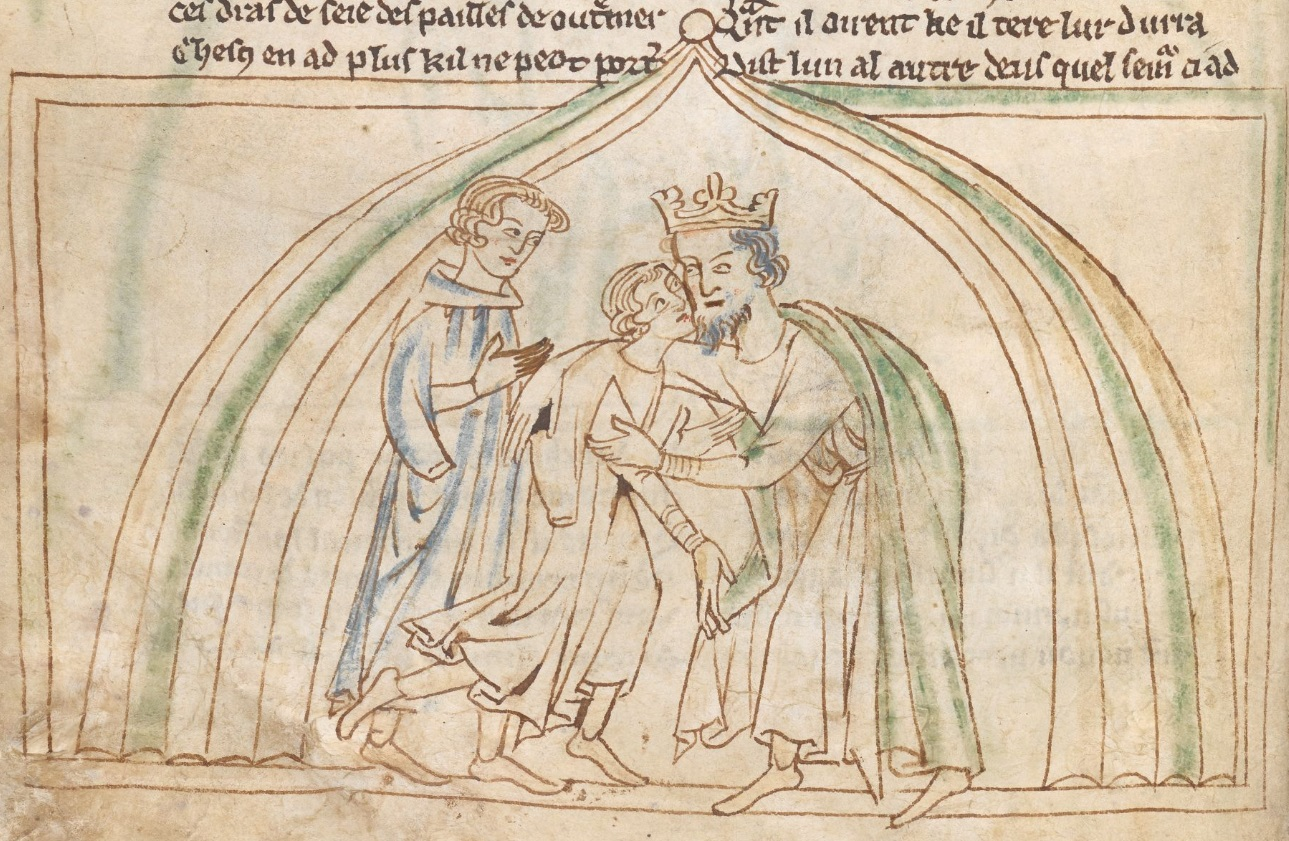
Charlemagne embracing his nephew Roland before knighting him, —Lansdowne MS 782, fol. 22v miniature

Chanson d'Aspremont (or simply Aspremont, or Agolant) is a 12th-century Old French chanson de geste (before 1190). The poem comprises 11, 376 verses (unusually long for a chanson de geste), grouped into rhymed laisses. The verses are decasyllables mixed with alexandrines.

The invading African Saracen forces under King Agolant and his son, Prince Aumon have overrun Calabria, Italy, and messages his intention to conquer Rome and the rest of Christendom. Charlemagne replies and defiance and they agree to battle at Aspremont, the "Bitter Mount" in Calabria.

The work deals mainly with the enfances (youthful exploits) of Roland, nephew of Charlemagne, namely his defeat of Prince Aumon and conquest of the sword Durendal, the horse Veillantif the olifant, and the subsequent dubbing as knight with the selfsame sword. (Note: It is declared at the beginning of the poem that Roland will be dubbed (adoba and girt with the sword Durendal (vv. 13–15). Later Prince Aumon appears in the work armed with the famous Durendal (vv. 3157, 3184), and Rolland defeats the prince, taking possession of Durendal (1237–8). The passages dealing with the dubbing does not explicitly used the French term adober, but Charlemagne personally girds Durendal onto Roland (vv. 7470–7473) while Naimes and Ogier attach spurs (vv. 7493–5). These suffice as ritual for dubbing in the older medieval period, as no tapping on the neck with fist or sword (accolade) was involved, as explained by Gautier, Ch. VIII, §VII.)

== Plotline ==
In this tale, the African Saracen king Agolant (var. Agoland) (Note: Standardized spelling as Agolant is Newth's translation, but in the original Old French, variously spelled Agolan, Agolans, Agolant, Agolen, Agoulant, Agoulanz.) and his son Aumon (Note: Standardized as Aumon in Newth tr.; variously spelled in OF as Almes, Almon, Almons, Aume, Aumes, Aumon, Aumons, Aumont, Ealmes, Ealmon, Eaumes, Eaumon, Eaumons, Eaumonz, Iamons, Iaumont, in proper names index, ending with the Brandin's gloss "Aumon, fils de Agolant" suggesting "Aumon" is Brandin's standard spelling. Variants of B fragment are Hiamunt, Hiamon, Hiaumont. Cf. Also Eaumond or Eamunt, Eamund in Lansdowne ms. Even more spellings are listed by Mandach: Omont, Omunt, Heaumont, Heaulmont, Heumon, Heumun, Almonte. The saga spelling is Jamund/Jamundr but has been bastardized in English commentary.) invade Calabria (v. 318) in Italy (with a force of 600,000, vv. 338–9), defying Charlemagne (Charles) through their messenger Balan (vv. 1ff; 604ff). This Balan after speaking to Duke Naimes reaches a decision to convert to Christianity (v. 548), and eventually renames himself Guitekin[s].

Charlemagne (Note: The name spellings throughout will follow Newth's translation, given in Newth's "Glossary", except "Charlemagne" will be used instead of Newth using "Carlon, Charlemayn, or Charles".) musters his troops to fight them. The invading army reaches Aspremont (literally "bitter mount") (vv. 1116–8), and the French traverse hills and plains, "broken bridges and strange waterways" so they are not able to maintain their ranks intact when they reach the mountain of Aspremont (vv. 1662–5). The French are suffering a great disadvantage in numbers. Charlemagne dispatches couriers and obtains reinforcements of 10,000 men from King Gondelbuef of Frisia, King Bruno of Hungary, and King Salemon of Brittany, respectively (vv. 926–960). He also writes to Didier of Pavia, which is relatively nearby, asking for provisions (v. 990–4).

Now Archbishop Turpin tells the king one man is still crucially missing as ally, namely, Duke Girart d'Eufrate, though the man is antagonistic towards the monarch. Turpin as his kinsman offers to be an envoy to try to recruit him (v. 1008–23). Girart, despite being such a "rebel baron", will fight well for the Christian cause, and play a decisive role in defeating the Saracen king and prince.

Charlemagne's nephew Roland (referred to as "Rolandin/Rollandins") is not considered a fully an adult, so that he and other youngsters are forbidden from joining the battle (vv. 1053–9) and kept under guards at Montloon/Monloon (vv. 1066, 1072) i.e., Laon (cf. image right). Roland of course will not be kept back, and will enter the fray.

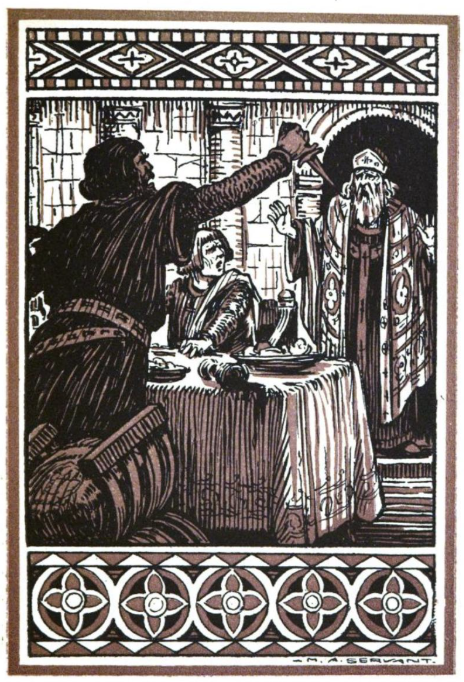
Girard rages at Bishop Turpin. —Drawing by M. A. Servant in Brandin tr. (1925) La chanson d'Aspremont

Turpin on his mission reaches Girart's city of Vienne (nominally Duchy of Burgundy (Note: Although Girart in the work is created Duke of Burgundy, historically the position did not occur until Guerin of Provence (who aided Charlemagne's grandson Charles the Bald) being awarded the divided portion of the former Burgundy to rule as Duke. A different circumstances than the Chanson developed later when the Duchy of Burgundy became independent of the French crown, and Richard the Justiciar was its first duke (<918).)), and interrupts his whole extended family having their meal, i.e., Girart attended by 4 knight, his son Ernault, his nephews Beuvon and Claron and Milon their father. But Girart rages at the suggestion he should pay "homage to the midget's son (i.e. of Pepin)", and points a deadly knife (cf. image right) and Turpin attempts to grab it away (vv. 1079–1145). (Note: Milon (1) is glossed as Count of Poitier and Girart's brother; Milon (2) is Girart's son, but not mentioned until v. 7426. Milon (3) is the Pope.) (Note: Note that while Girart pointed the knife at Turpin, Turpin later makes a payback with pen and ink.) But Turpin rides off, thinking he failed to recruit Girart (vv. 1214–6).

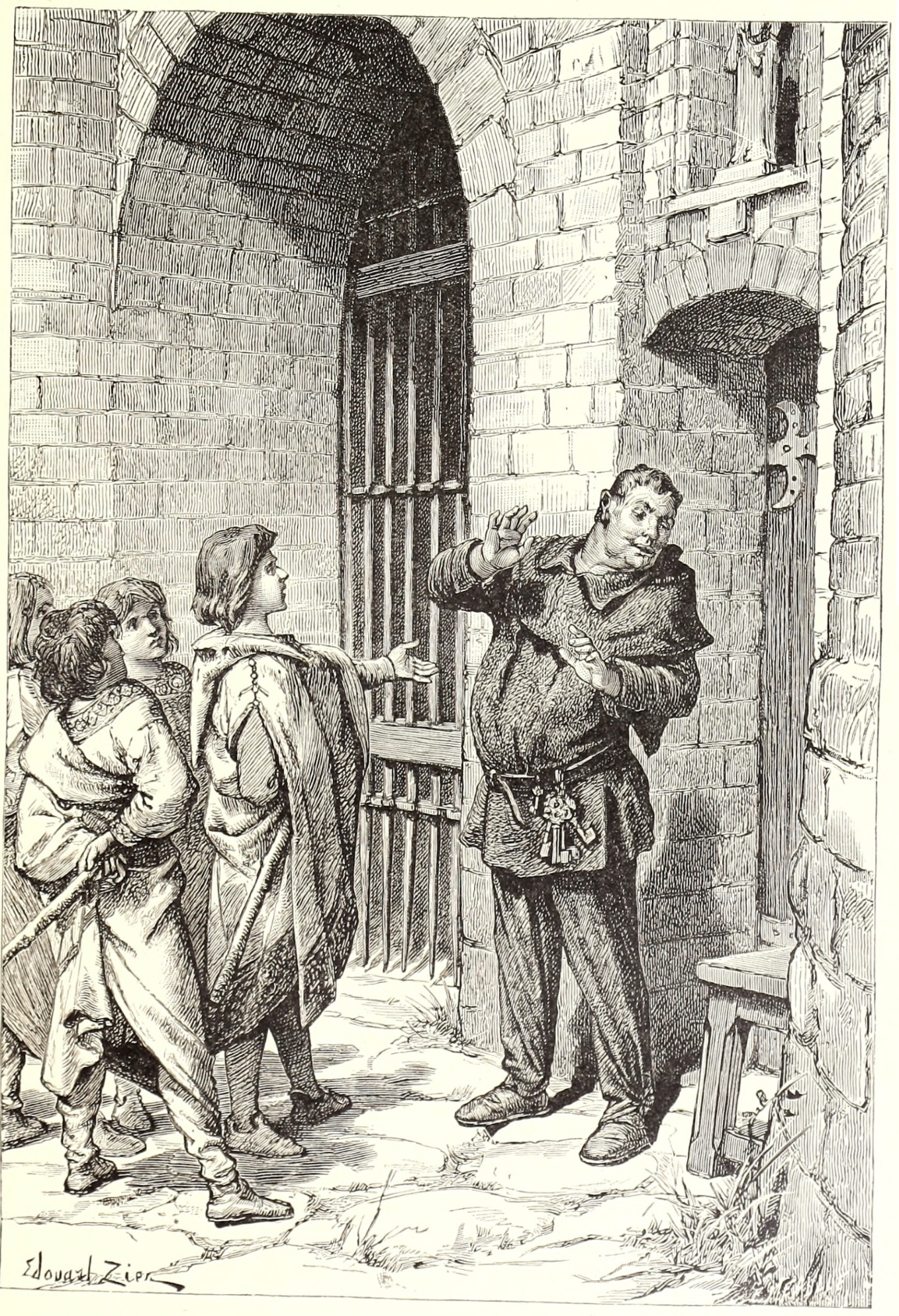
"Let us out. Come now." -- "No I tell you". Young Roland and youths trying to escape porter at Laon. —Illustration by Édouard Zier in Gautier (1895) [1883] Chevalerie.

The poem turns to Roland Roland and the youths, locked away at Laon, (Note: The youths had been deposited at Berenger's fortification at Laon by Archbishop Turpin on his way to recruit Girart (vv. 1071–73).) while they hear the noise of Charlemagne's troops marching by. The youths beg the porter to let them out to go see (cf. image left), but in the end, club them with applewood sticks and escape. They come across soldiers from Brittany and steal their horses. But Roland is forgiven by the King Salemon of Brittany (vv. 1239–1370).

While Charlemagne reaches Rome (1404), Girart is still in an irksome mood, and gathers his two sons, Renault and Renier, and nephews Claron and Beuvon (vv. 1420–21) (Note: The text only says Renault and Renier are "two sons" (doi fil et Renals et Renier), but Newth tr. interpolates the other two as nephews. Although Renals/Renault appears suspiciously like a scribal error for Ernault, Brandin's name index lists Renals as a son of Girart who appears only at this line.) and begins to spew his wrath over how Charlemagne dares to call for his help, and delivers a speech not to be beholden to Charles by land title or service once he is dead, His wife Emmeline is there to dissuade him, but her reprimands quickly escalate to her saying she is amazed God lets him breathe for all His laws Girart has breached, and for all the villainy he's committed, if she were him, she'd go straight to St. Peter's in Rome and be shriven, then go help Charles at Aspremont. Girart is now persuaded, readies for war, but first knights his nephews (vv. 1529–48) and dubs his sons Renier, then Ernault (vv. 1555–66).

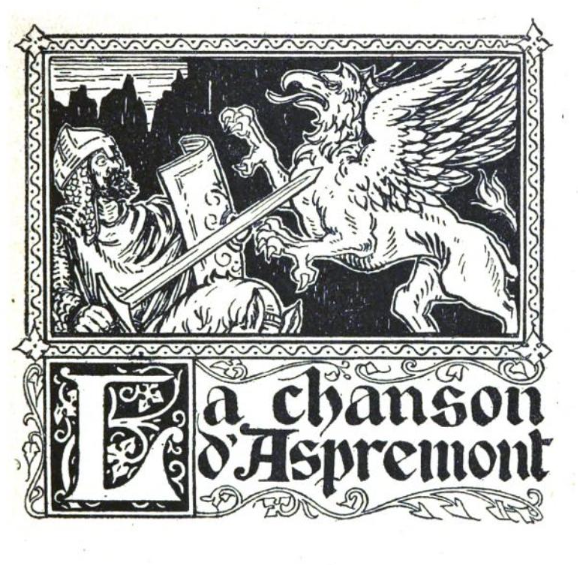
Griffin. One was fought against by Richer. —Drawing by M. A. Servant in Brandin tr. (1925) La chanson d'Aspremont

Young Richer (French: Richier) also deserves mention; this nephew of Count Berenger (vv. 1776–8 (Note: Glossed as such and protége of Naimes)) volunteers to act as envoy, but a griffin (v. 1825; cf. image right) of Aspermont devours his horse. (Note: An Aragon destrier.) Naimes scolds him and takes over Charlemagne's letter and the mission to deliver it (vv. 1891–7). Naimes later says he spoke to harshly to Richer after he meets the griffin and manages to its taloned feet; the object is on display at Compiègne, as the poet tells it (vv. 1195–1217).

Naimes assuming the mission of messenger leaves Laon and arrives at the enemy camp, to ask Agolant about the invasion. He is stopped by Gorhan (glossed as son of Balan and Agolant's seneschal but also lover of his Queen) who has borrowed a white horse to ride (vv. 2174, 2211), but covets Naime's black horse Morel (v. 2273) (Note: Note that Naime's Morel is later hijacked by Roland to ride on.) and they fight until Naimes has the upper hand; a truce is called, and Gorhan agrees to convey Naimes to see Agolant, but fears Naimes may be risking death (vv. 2345–59). Indeed, Agolant is advised by his well-informed spy Sorbrin (v. 2498) that Naimes should be dismembered to cause Charlemagne the greatest grief (vv. 2511–2525). But Balan intercedes, and Naimes carries message back to Charlemagne that the forces shall meet and fight in three days time, though the pagans will show mercy if Charlemagne will convert to Mahometism (vv. 2575–92). Naimes catches the seductive attention of Agolant's queen who gives him a gold ring that wards against magic and poisons (vv. 2620–63). Balan also offers riches to the reluctant Naimes, and finally prevails upon him to accept a horse whiter than snow or crystal as a gift to the French king (vv. 2680–94). (Note: Occurs in the saga at Chapter 19. Hieatt notes "This white horse appears to have been a detail which struck many readers of Asp." and adds there is relevant development in Ch. 54 (For Ch. 54, cf. explanatory note below).) Naimes returns riding it (v. 2759), and transfers the white destrier (v. 2915) over to Charlemagne. (Note: Note that in Chevalerie Ogier, ed. Barrois, Charlemagne has a horse named Blanchart (v. 6232) or Blanchart d'Alie (vv. 3273, 6345), and later in the same work, Charles offers his horse he conquered from "l'amiral Balant" (v. 10426) for Ogier to ride, but it gets crushed under Ogier's weight. In Bulfinch's retelling, Charlemagne exempts his Blanchard from being tested by Ogier.)

Naimes had ridden back escorted by Balan, via a different route, and was shown the tower held by Aumon, with 100,000 Turks, guarding the mountain pass on Aspremont leading to lands beyond (vv. 2720–4). (Note: Balan is thus feeding intelligence beneficial to the French, but he is not ready to fully defect at this point, and in order to repay the what he owes to Agolant who raised him (from infancy), goes back to fight with the Saracens, even though he thinks the cause is doomed, bidding greetings to Charles and his stalwarts (vv. 2734–44).) Naimes advises that the outmanned French could still gain victory if they concentrate the attack on Aumon himself (vv. 2856–67). The odds are 100,000 Saracens pitted against 30,000 Christians (vv. 3103–4). Aumon is armed with the famed sword Durendal (vv. 3157, 3184, 3228, etc.) mounted on his "ebony horse" (v. 3227). (Note: i.e., Veillantif is a black horse.) Geoffrey the Angevin (French: Joifroi (Note: Appears in Chanson de Roland, Oxford ms. version, v. 106)) and Huon/Hugh of Mans/Manseau (French: Hüon/Huë/Huës (Note: Also mentioned in the Chanson de Roland, but not in the Oxford text and hence not in the 4002 lines edition by Stengel (i.e., not in Langlois's R). Huon does occur in the extended portions from the other mss., namely (Langlois's R1, R2). In Duggan (2005)'s edition: Huon (1)/Huon du Mans, v. 5260, is glossed as Huon de Mes, Christian noble; Hugues du Mans 5129, 5133; (Hugues du Mans in ms. T=Trinity College, Cambridge≈Ro2; Hües del Mans in mss. CV7=Chartreux-Venice 7 mss.=Ro1 and Hües li Mainnes 6285.)) (vv. 2877–9) are companions in combat, and the former takes down a Turk from Argenoi, the latter a cousin of Aumon (Note: Gillefroi (v. 3174). Name unincluded in Newth's proper names list.) (vv. 3174–82). Hector, Aumon's flag-bearer (vv. 3223–4), is killed by Richer, and although Aumon salvages his flag (vv. 3298–3309), Aumon is now put to flight (vv. 3315–20).

Girart de Fraite does arrive to help, hoisting the flag of St. Maurice, with a force 60,000 strong (vv. 3909–20). When Girard stooped to bow to the king (lifting his hood), etc., Turpin recorded every humiliating detail in pen on parchment, thus taking revenge for the threat with the knife he incurred earlier (vv. 4149–62) The French forces regroup. The vanguard division has 7,000 troop (including Salemon), the 2nd division of 7,000 under Duke Milon (including Gondelbuef), Duke Naimes leading the 3rd division of 25,000 (vv. 4314–37), and there are also the 4th, 5th, 6th and 7th divisions or battalions, for a total of 60,000 (vv. 4338–81).

Roland joins the battle by arming himself with a stick or truncheon (Old French: tronçon, vv. 5725, 6017, 6036) (Note: Newth translates as "waving for a spear a wooden picket" at v. 4971, but the original reads"A son col tint un grand pel de pomier", v. 4971 which reads ".. a great stick of applewood", since pel is a "broad, flat piece of wood or iron, a long handle" and in this context, near synonymous with tinel or massue denoting a "club".) and mounting a horse (vv. 4969–71), afterwards commandeering Duke Naime's horse Morel and Naimes "is left to stand there and to rage!" (Note: In the saga version, Ch. 54 alluded to in above note, Duke Naimes spares his acquaintance Balan met in battle, and they dismount to get reacquainted; meanwhile, Rollant comes along on a nag and seeing the empty saddle, wistfully assumes Duke Nemes has fallen in battle and appropriates Nemes's horse Morel.) (vv. 5749–5755). Charlemagne fights Aumon in single combat, initially protected by a helm with a jewel on the nasal that even sustains blows from Aumon's sword Durendal (vv. 5894–5, 5937–47). But Aumon strips this helm away and Charlemagne is in mortal danger, when Roland arrives (v. 6009). Roland defeats Aumon and saves Charlemagne. Roland captures Aumon's olifant, his sword Durendal and his horse Viellantif ("Wideawake", Old French: Vielantiu, vv. 6076–8).

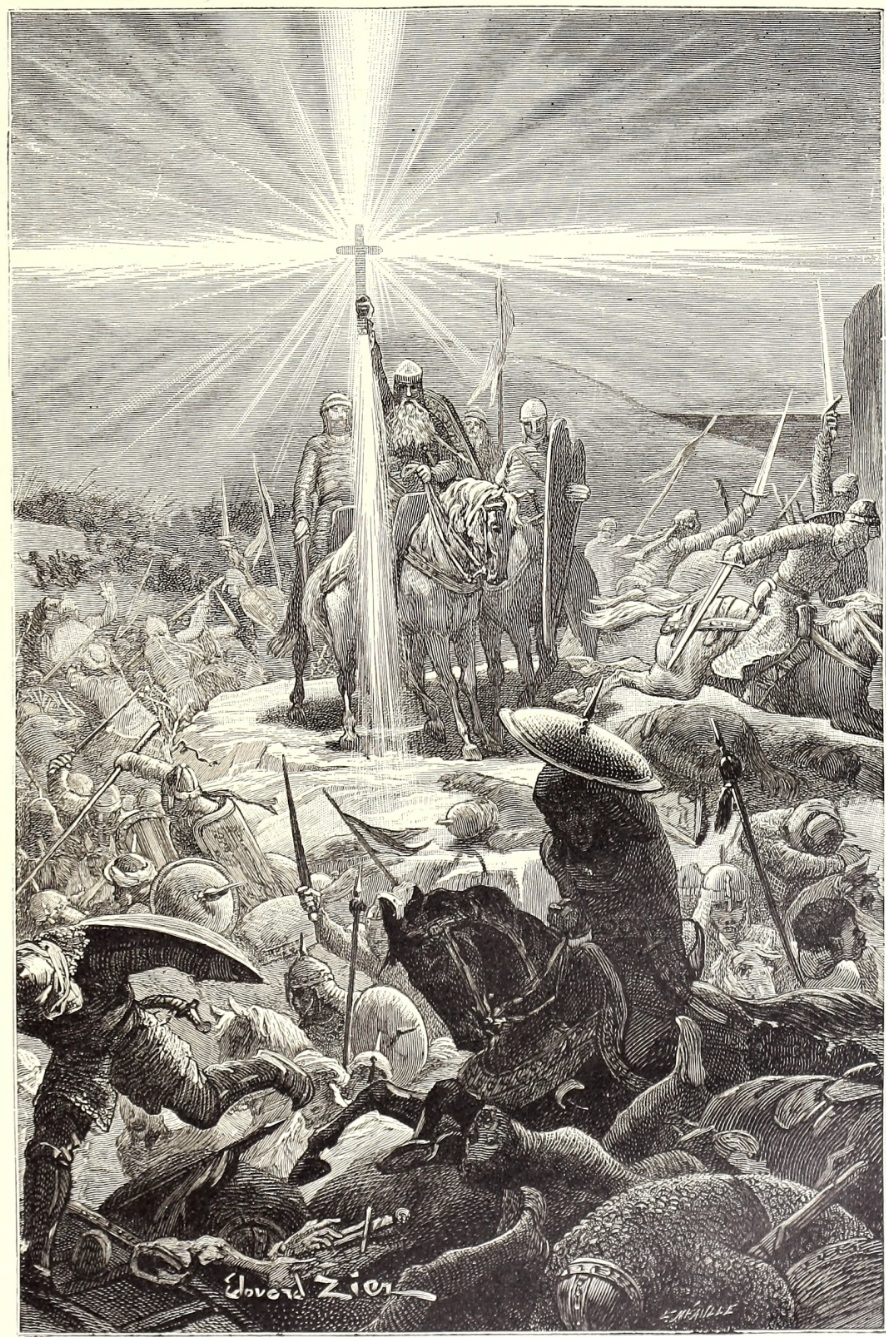
The Benediction at Aspremont. Turpin holding up the crucifix containing a piece of the True Cross, which starts glowing. —Illustration by Édouard Zier in Gautier (1895) [1883] Chevalerie.

The work turns to the second half or Book Two. The French have taken over Aumon's tent and camp, and there is held a ceremony distributing spoils and promotions. Girart d'Eufrate motions to have some 3000 men dubbed knights, and the crowd (led by Girart's sons Girart's Miles and Ernault, who are already knights) head for Charlemagne to get properly armed (7399–7429).

Charles knights Roland, girding him with Durendal (laisse 377–8, vv. 7480–7510). (Note: A miniature painting of this girding occurs on British Library Lansdowne MS 782, fol. 23v.) Pope Milon conducts mass for the French army, and on the occasion, holds a cross which held a portion of the "Blest Beam" where Christ was wounded by Longinus (7671-4) This crucifix containing a piece of the True Cross will play a key highlight role below.

Meanwhile, back in Reggio, the Saracen king Agolant does not know the fate of Aumon, and is irked his son has not reported. He is aware the four idols have been taken by the French (vv. 7688–95), as well as gold and arms, so that Mandaquin counsels exercising great caution against the fortified French (7699-7706), while another counters the Saracens should demand the return of the idols, conversion to Mahometism, as well as tributes including virgins (7707-22) Agolant dispatches the envoys Uliens and Galindres bearing an olive branch (Note: Old French: rain d'olive, v. 7732) as envoys (vv. 7723–34) who communicate the latter, high-handed diplomacy demanding capitulation against overwhelming forces, as Charles is "trapped as surely as is the bird in lime!", (Note: Old French: Tot estes pris con li oisials em broi, v. 7897) as well as the aforementioned conversion, reparations/tribute.

With renewed battle a certainty, Pope Milon tries to find someone to carry the Blest crucifix into battle (v. 8375ff.), and finally Turpin of Reims to do so (vv. 8490–3). The Frenchmen once again drop on their knees to worship the Cross. Soon, they see three knights come down the ridge of Aspremont. When Ogier approaches, the one mounted on a white stallion (v. 8512) identifies himself as St. George (Yorge, v. 8517). As the African contingent arrives, among them the huge-statured Mandaquin, the Saint bids Roland not to fear, but to invoke his name for luck, and thereon, the Christian battle-cry of "St. George" (Crie «Sains Iorge») stuck (vv. 8528–41).

The cross in Turpin's hand glows bright and keeps Saracens at bay. The Pope's words explains how it "blazes forth/ And bars approach by any Infidel" (vv. 9295-6). Turpin then temporarily returns custody of the cross back to the Pope in order to enter the fray with his weapon (vv. 9312-16). But later Turpin again takes possession of the holy cross, its radiance blinding the Saracens (cf. fig. right) and sapping their morale ("La sainte crois reluire et flamboier", v. 9402). The infidel complain "A curse upon this gonfalonier!" (v. 9755).

In the end, Agolant is killed in battle (beheaded by Clairon/Claires at vv. 10479–484) and Charlemagne returns in triumph. Girart d'Eufrate in open speech submits to the king Charles, but sotto voce mutters that his pride will not tolerate it (vv. 11349–355).

== Analysis ==
Agolant seems to be modeled on the historical Banū Aghlab (Aghlabids) of Tunisia.

Among Charlemagne's douzepers (paladins), the Duke Naimes performs as the all-accomplished knight in this work. In the version edited by Guessard, Naimes is hailed as Charlemagne's foremost counsellor, Gautier quotes from Guessard's version on Duke Naimes that "He gave no advice, neither great nor small, that would cause an honest man to be disinherited, nor would he harm widows or young children". (Note: Il ne donna conseil petit ne grant / Par coi preudome deserité fussant / Les veves fames ne li petit enfant, Gautier (1895), p. 52, citing Gautier & Guessard edd. (1855), p. 1, vv. 6–8; paraphrased rather differently by Gautier & Frith tr. (1891), pp. 42–43; Frith renders veves fames as "starving widow" but the same phrase in Girart's speech below is not translated by Newth as "starving, famished", and the operative word should be taken to be Old French fames, femes meaning "women".) Oddly, in the edition edited by Brandin (translated by Newth), Girart d'Eufrate makes a very similar speech to Charlemagne that an ideal king should, among other things, "..help orphans and feed them from his purse. Look after widows and their safety preserve" (vv. 7166–7) near the beginning of the second book of the work. (Note: Book 2 starts v. 6555)

More such speech comes from Duke Naimes which Gautier characterizes as a prime example of largesse: Naimes counsels Charles "Do not be stingy in your expenditure, even though not a farthing may remain" in the treasury, offering his own wealth to be used first, to be distributed preferentially to the "poor knights, so that their wives may benefit", (Note: Translated by Gautier & Frith tr. (1891), pp. 70–71, from Gautier (1895), p. 84, rendered in modern French, footnoting the original Old French text as:"Ne soiés mie trop avers despensier... --En vos tresors mar remanra denier. -- Le mien meïsme departez tot premier. -- Tant donez as povres chevaliers / Que miels en soit à lor povre moilliers., at Gautier & Guessard edd. (1855), p. 2, vv. 7, 13–16.) with the result that the "poor vavasours" leave like (dukes) and counts. Gautier's idealization is somewhat taken out of context, because Naime's counsel explicitly states that this is to ingratiate themselves to warriors especially while they are poor, so that in time of military need they will respond to call for help.

On the youthful exploits of Roland in this work, it is pointed out that there is a general taboo which forbids the underaged heroes not yet knighted from wielding edged weapons. Although Ogier, Vivien de Monbranc, and Garin breached this rule, other heroes such as the young Guillaume d'Orange refused his weapon until properly dubbed, as id Renier (father of Oliver). Young Roland somewhat follows the pattern of using a stick (a pel/piel of applewood) as weapon, rather like Guillaume d'Orange's brother-in-law Rainouart (Note: Cf. Guillaume d'Orange cycle.) using a tinel.

Newth says "There are several examples of clerical and anticlerical humor in the poem", and while the fighting archbishop is treated favorably, Girart's defiance even at Turpin's threat of excommunication is anticlerical in tenor. Girart threatens Turpin with a knife when the archbishop came as emissary to recruit him, later Turpin avenges the dagger episode by recording on parchment every detail of Girart's moment of humiliation paying homage to King Charles. But this was just a slice of feudal court life, according to commentators. This poem claims that Turpin rose from the monastery of Jumièges in Normandy to become ordained at Reims (vv. 8436–42), though historians suppose Tilpin to have trained at St. Denis.

== Manuscripts and editions ==
The base manuscript used by Louis Brandin in his 1919–1921 edition (11376 lines) was the "Wollaton Hall" manuscript, which he designated as W, now Nottingham, University of Nottingham Library, Wollaton Library Collection, shelfmark Mi LM 6. (Note: W is also used by de Mandach but not Arlima.net.) Michael A. Newth's English translation also used the Wollaton Hall manuscript, matching Brandin's edition. Mandach's study excerpted text using Add MS 35289 (L^{3}, (Note: More precisely, Roepke's L^{3} is Mandach's L3.) Brandin's N) as base text, with the Franco-Italian Venice VI (V6, or Roepke's V^{2}) used as control, considering it to be very close to his base text.

There were 17 manuscripts (including Franco-Italian texts) known to Fritz Roepke (1909); there were 20 identified by Moisan (1958) with actually four additional mss. (Note: Monfrin identified Roepke's P^{4} and C fragments as parts of the same ms., and counted the two as one.) are tabulated by Monfrin (1958) in a comparison chart listing the different sigla used by various editors.

Of these, the purely French (non-Italian) manuscripts (denoted using basically Roepke's abbreviations) are: P^{1}P^{2}P^{3}P^{4}P^{5} are Paris, Bibliothèque nationale de France, français, 2495, (Note: Brandin ed. (1921), p. 168's A) 25529, (Note: Brandin ed. (1921), p. 168's C) 1598; BnF nouvelles acquisitions françaises, 5094, and 10039. (Note: Brandin ed. (1921), p. 168's F) L^{1}L^{2}L^{3} are London, British Library, Royal 15 E vi. (aka The Talbot Shrewsbury Book, at fol. 43r-69v), (Note: Brandin ed. (1921), p. 168's L) Lansdowne MS 782, (Note: Brandin ed. (1921), p. 168's M) and Add MS 35289 (olim Ashburnham ms.). (Note: Brandin ed. (1921), p. 168's N) B (fragment) is Berlin, ms. Gall. qu. 48; Br (fragment) is Brussels, KBR, IV 621 (1); C (fragment) is Clermont-Ferrand, (Note: Brandin ed. (1921), p. 168's G) Archives départementales du Puy-de-Dôme; Ch was formerly Cheltenham, Thomas Phillipps Library, but now housed by the Bodmer Library in Cologny near Geneva (digitized version); E (fragment) Erfurt; R is Rome, Vatican Library, Reginensi latini, 1360 (but later another Vatican Library manuscript, Palatini latini, 1971, V, was identified (Note: Monfrin's #16.,)).

Other mss. recategorized as versions of the Cantari d'Aspramonte, i.e., the Franco-Italian reworking (French: remaniement; Italian: rifacimento) are Roepke's V^{1}V^{2} = Venice Biblioteca Marciana ms. fr. 225 (olim fr. IV) and ms. fr. 226 (olim fr. VI) abbreviated as V4 and V6 by de Mandach. Likewise Roepke's F (single leaf) = Florence, cl. IV, Nr. 932 belongs here, and the P^{3} is cross-categorized here also. The manuscript Cha = Chantilly (Chateau de Chantilly) Musée Condé library ms. 470 is another addition to this Franco-Italian category. (Note: Chantilly is Monfrin's #3., a new ms. with no sigla attached by any of his previous authors; the Cha siglum is added by de Mandach (1975, 1980).)

== Reception ==
Versions of this chanson were extremely popular in England, to the extent that copies were manufactured or commissioned by the English (Note: Add. ms. 35289 was made in Canterbury, and the Talbot Shrewsbury Book was commissioned by the English count of that name.) and many copies made in Anglo-Norman).

== Adaptations ==
The work was adapted into Italian prose by Andrea da Barberino. (Note: Texts: Barberino & Boni ed. (1951)=Moisan: As2; Barberino, Cavalli & ed. (1972))

In Scandinavia, this poem and the Pseudo-Turpin (PT) were combined into Karlamagnús saga Branch IV, Af Agulando konungi ("King Agulandus") The combining of the sources in the Norse saga has forced Aspremont to be located in Spain, rather than in Calabria, Italy as properly occurs in the original French poem. Saga appropriated the first part of PT (first 18 chapters) and translated the Latin-version of the battle with Agolandus but skipped Agolandus's death; then it switch source, drawing now from the Chanson d'Aspremont about a 1/3 of the way in. It was from the poem that the saga introduced Agloandus's son Jamundr (not present in PT). (Note: Halvorsen 1959, p. 54 explains the transition locations more precisely. The "abrupt" end of PT occurs at Unger ed. (1860), p. 282, l. 29 which is the end of Kap. 23 here, but corresponds to Hieatt tr. (1975), p. 128, the end of her Ch. 25 in English translation. The chapter down with King Altumant (Latin: Automaior) of Cordoba surrendering to Charlemagne. Unger ed. Kap. 24 then begins, and inserts a transitional text (p. 282, l. 23 to p. 283, l. 6) summarizing vv. 2963–3371 of the poem, corresponding to Hieatt tr. (1975), pp. 149–150, 152, 154, i.e., "Kap. 24 of a-version" texts appended piecemeal to English tr. Ch. 26–28. This transitional text is from Jamund hearing news of Altumant's surrender to the clash of divisions and heavy casualty on both sides. The saga then switches to translating the poem more fully, from v. 3372ff, starting at Unger ed. (1860), p. 283, l. 7, corresponding to Hieatt tr. (1975), p. 156, the Kap. 24 from a-version appended to Ch. 29. Here, the French have looted the pagan idols of Mahumet and Termagant. Compare the original poem where the French have sacked "Tervagant, / Great Jupiter, Apollo and proud Mahom, /All four of them with finest gold a-sparkle!", at Newth tr. (1989), p. 83, vv. 3374–6.)
