= Durendal =

Sword of Roland, Paladin of Charlemagne

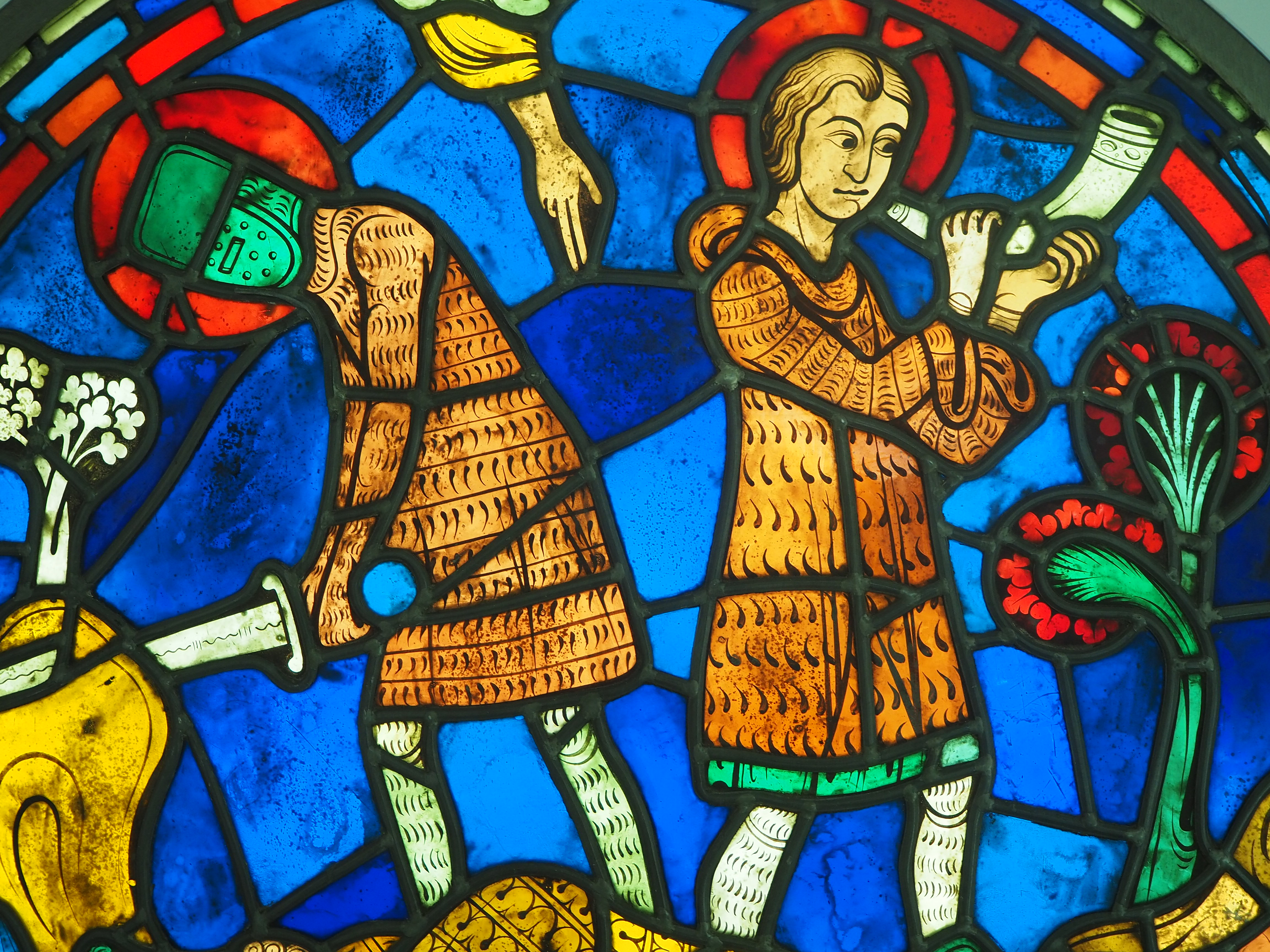
Roland cleaving a rock with Durendal and blowing the olifant before death. –Replica (c. 1942) of the 13th century stained glass window at Chartres Cathedral

Durendal, also spelled Durandal, is the sword of Roland, a legendary paladin and partially historical officer of Charlemagne in French epic literature. The sword is famous for its hardness and sharpness. Sources including La Chanson de Roland (The Song of Roland) state that it first belonged to the young Charlemagne.

According to one legend, at the end of the Battle of Roncevaux Roland hurled the sword from him to prevent it being seized by the Saracens, and it came to rest in Rocamadour. A replica sword that was embedded in a rock face there was reported stolen in June 2024.

== Etymology ==
The name Durendal arguably begins with the French dur- stem, meaning "hard", though "enduring" may be the intended meaning. Rita Lejeune argues that the name may break down into durant + dail, which may be rendered in English as "strong scythe"/"hard sickle" or explained in more detail to mean "a scimitar or scythe that holds up, resists, endures". Gerhard Rohlfs suggests dur + end'art, "strong flame" or "[a flame] burns strongly from it".

The Pseudo-Turpin explains that the name "'Durendal' is interpreted to mean [that] it gives a hard strike" (Durenda interpretatur durum ictum cum ea dans). It has been argued that the Pseudo-Turpin offering a gloss of the meaning constitutes evidence that it was a name that was not readily understood in French. (Note: Unlike "Halteclere" or "Joyeuse", which are easily comprehensible as French words.)

One non-French etymology is Edwin B. Place's attempt to construe it in Breton as diren dall, meaning "blade [that] dulls cutting edge" or "blade [that] blinds". Another is James A. Bellamy's Arabic etymology, explaining a possible origin of the sword's name in ḏū l-jandal (ذو الجندل), meaning "master of stone". (Note: Encouraged by the fact that there are many Arabic sword names with this prefix, e.g. Ḏū l-Faqār.)

These theories and more have been surveyed in the work of Gustav A. Beckmann (2023), and each refuted on the basis of his suggested counterarguments. Beckmann argued the -dart form must have been the original form of the sword, and favors the construction Durand(us) + art for etymology, while allowing for the possibility of Rohlfs's dur-end-art "hard it burns out" explanation. The suggestion of Durand(us) + art is credited to linguist Albert Dauzat (Note: Dauzat (1939) p. 375; Dauzat (1952), p. 39 apud Beckmann (2023), p. 474 and Place (1949), p. 162) Leo Spitzer (1940) had also endorsed Dauzat's construction after recanting; he had refuted Rohlfs's theory and did not favor Dauzat's either at first, but he later retracted his own suggestion and backed Dauzat.

== Properties ==
According to legend, the sword was capable of cutting through giant boulders with a single strike, and was indestructible.

== Chanson de Roland ==
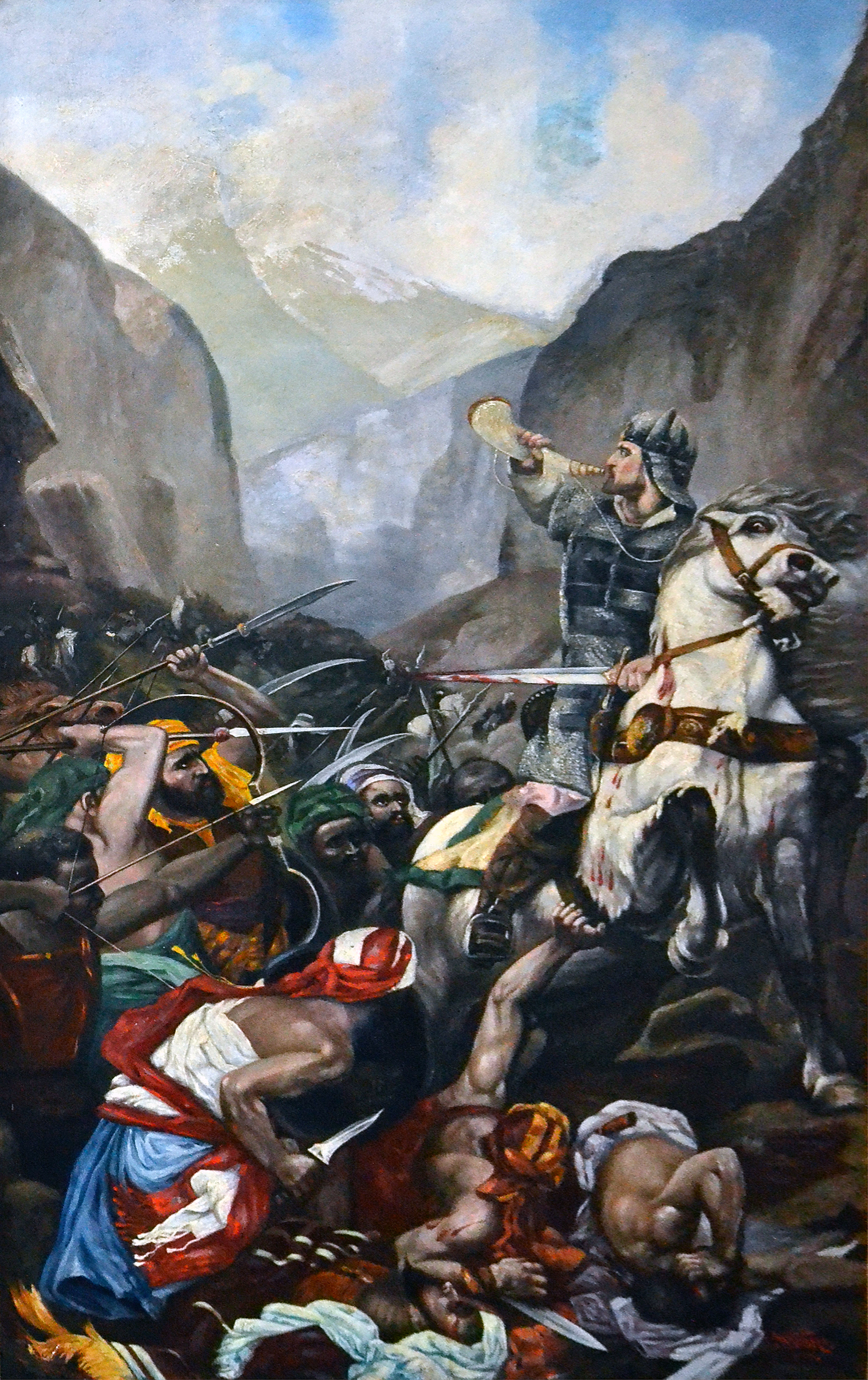
Roland holds Durendal while blowing olifant at Battle of Roncevaux –painting by Wolf von Bibra (1862–1922).

In La Chanson de Roland (The Song of Roland), the sword is said to contain within its golden hilt a tooth of Saint Peter, blood of Basil of Caesarea, hair of Saint Denis, and a piece of the raiment of Mary, mother of Jesus. (Note: "E Durendal, cum ies bone et saintisme!/ En l'oriet punt asez i ad reliques: La dent saint Perre e del sanc saint Basilie / Et des chevels mun seignor saint Denise,/ Del vestement i ad sainte Marïe.)", vv. 2344-48)

According to legend as recounted in the poem, at the Battle of Roncevaux Pass Roland took the rearguard to hold off Saracen troops long enough for Charlemagne's army to retreat into France. He slew a vast number of enemies: wielding Durendal, he sliced the right arm of the Saracen king Marsile, (Note: Riding on a horse named Gaignun/Gaignon, mentioned here. The name means "watch dog" or a type of mastiff.) decapitated the king's son Jursaleu or Jurfaleu and put the one-hundred-thousand-strong army to flight. (Note: "Marsilie.. /Siet el cheval qu'il apelet Gaign..Puis prent la teste de Jurfaleu le blund.. filz al rei Marsiliun", etc., vv. 1889-1909) His mission accomplished, Roland senses he is near death, (Note: v. 2259) and comes to a spot with "four blocks of marble", (Note: "quatre perruns i ad de marbre faiz)", v. 2268 "four great marble blocks"; "four terraces, of marble wrought") when a Saracen tries to steal his sword, Roland smashes his head and helm with his olifant. (Note: vv. 2274–84) So that the weapon does not fall into enemy hands, he attempts to destroy Durendal by hitting it against a sardonyx block, (Note: "Rollanz ferit el perrun de sartanie)" vv. 2312ff) (Note: Chamard, Henri, tr., Chanson de Roland, Laisse 172, in modern French, excerpted in with notes in English by Rivers&Bishop2005.) (Note: In modern French tr., sardoine which is "sardonyx", but editors footnote this as "sard or brown agate" indicating there is a range of types of chalcedony this word could be referring to. Moncrieff renders as "sardonyx terrace".), yet the sword is indestructible, chipping away more flakes of the "dark stone".

Roland recounts that when Charles was at the "Vale of Moriane", an angel bid the king to give the sword to a capable "count and captain", and the king girt the sword onto Roland (Note: "vals de Morïane", etc. vv. 2318–21) (cf. § Origins and previous ownership).

Finally, mortally wounded, he hid it beneath his body as he lay dying along with the olifant, the horn he had used to alert Charlemagne.

== Mainet ==
According to the fragmentary work Mainet which describes the youthful exploits of Charlemagne when he fled to Saracen-controlled parts of Spain, Charles (as Mainet, the pseudonym he adopted (Note: Mainet is the diminutive of "Magne".) after defecting) served in the court of Galafre wooing his daughter Galienne. Charles on Galafre's behalf fights the enemy Braimant and wins the sword Durendal.

This work identifies the forger of Durendal as a smith named Haurifas, brother of Galant (Wayland the Smith). (Note: Only "Hauri.." is legible due to damage in manuscript, but reconstructed as "Haurifas" by editor Gaston Paris based on the assertion that the name derived from Latin aurifex for "goldsmith", despite knowing that "Haurisas" [sic] (cf. following note re misspelling) was the spelling given for this sibling smith of Galant in Fierabras.) (Note: Though misspelt as Haurisas, by Paris, the name actually reads "Aurisas" in ms. b and "Hanisars" in base ms. a in the Fierabras text. Depping uses the Hanisars spelling.)

A more complete version is preserved in Girart d'Amiens's compilation Charlemagne (c. 1300), as well as the Low Rhenish (<(Low) Frankish<Low German) Karlmeinet. This work is sometimes classed as Dutch. (Note: Voretzsch (1925)[1905] and English tr. (1931)) (Note: Voretzsch's translator characterizes Karlmeinet as Dutch, but Voretzsch's original work clearly separates Karlmeinet as niederrheinische and Karel ende Elegast as niederländische. It appears that medieval Low Rhenish or Low Franconian defies categorization of either Middle High or Middle Low German, hence often treated as Middle Dutch) (Note: What Voretzsch called a Middle Dutch work, Karel ende Elegast is irrelevant here, as well as not belongings to other works that adapted Mainet,as it is rather an adaptation of its sequel, Basin: it tells of the robber-knight Elegast (Basin in the French version) who helps Charlemagne.)

There is also the Italian (or Franco-Italian) Karleto, and the Spanish Crónica general.

The Low-German version Karlmeinet/Karl Meinet/Karl Mainet (Note: To be more precise, the first part of Karlmeinet dubbed Karl und Galie (in Rhenish verse). Below, some of the pertinent texts are cited using either Dagmar Helm ed. (1976) Karl und Galie or his later modern translation Helm tr. (1999) to clarify they belong to this Part 1 of Karlmeinet.) (Note: Subsequent portions of Karlmeinet no longer correspond to Mainet. The third part is adapted from Vincent de Beauvais Speculum and it source Pseudo-Turpin, and deals with Karl fending off foreign powers. The fourth part is Karl und Elegast, which is considered a loose translation from the Middle Dutch Karel ende Elegast aforementioned.) in accordance with the French version, describes how a belligerent King of Africa named Bremunt invaded Gallafers's Spanish Kingdom lusting after princess Galie. (Note: Karl Meinet, A26, 25ff.) She, however, falls in love with young Charlemagne being harbored by Gallafers. While the Mainet fragment mentioned Mainet having received the gift of a white horse Afilé that belonged to Galafre, (Note: Mainet IVa, vv. 19–20, Paris ed. (1875), p. 328 and commentary, p. 310) (Note: Horse received via the Saracen friend Morant le Turfier (Morans de Turfie, v. 3, Morant de Surie, IId, 43)) Karlmeinet describes the hero being knighted with the gift of the sword Galosevele and the horse Affeleir as white as a swan. (Note: Karl Meinet, A54, 12–37 (Galosevele, l. 20, Affeleir, l. 31); var. Golosebele, A55, 29) Young Charles's combat with Bremunt took place near Toledo at the Vael Moriale, i.e. the vale of Moriane mentioned in La chanson de Roland. (Note: Karl Meinet, A78, 57.) The exploits are told of the aggressor king Bremunt with his magnificent sword that was nameless until he named it Durendart. (Note: Karl Meinet, A81, 57, 19–25ff (Durendart, l. 29, var. Durendarde, l. 41; Durendar, 82, 50).) (Note: Aforementioned Morant and Euert/Everhart fall victim to Durendart, to Charlemagne's grief. (A86, 51–87).) As expected Charles defeats Bremunt who begs promise to bury him and flings over the sword, and grabbing it Charlemagne now becomes the winner of Durendart/Durendarde. (Note: Karl Meinet, A96, 7–29 (Durendarde, l. 12).)

In the Spanish version found in the Primera Crónica General, Galiana gives her beloved Don Maynet the sword Joyosa (Joyeuse), which she had received from her suitor Bramant; then Maynet fighting against the now belligerent Bramant, kills and decapitates the foe, and winning a second sword, Durendart. There is also a second version found in the Gran conquista de Ultramar, but the names are Arabacized, turning Galiana into Halia, Galafre into Haxem, and Bramant into Abrahin. Thus, instead of the passage in the PCG where Galiana gives Maynet the sword Joyosa, the corresponding text in Gran conquista de Ultramar explains that after he promises to marry if he returns alive from the fight, and she (Halía) promises to convert to Christianity, "she gave him her father's arms and horse, and a sword that was wonderfully rich and very good, for there was no other like it in all the land, except the one that Abrahin, king of Zaragoza, carried, which they called Durandarte".

== Spanish tradition ==
The Spanish epic Cantar de Roncesvalles (dated to 13th century by Ramón Menéndez Pidal; somewhat later by others) only survived in a hundred line fragment, and tells of the aftermath of the battle at Roncesvalles, where Charlemagne (Carlos) searching for bodies finds Bishop Turpin (Turpín) and Oliver (Olivieros) before reaching his nephew Roland's body (Roldán). Aymon (Aimón) also discovers the remains of his son Renaud de Montauban (Reinalte de Montalbán). There is loose resemblance to the Chanson de Roland, but the song appears to inherit a different Spanish tradition as represented in the Nota Emilianense. Pidal categorized the work as a cantar de gesta (chanson de geste). Charlemagne further suffers the loss of the sword Durandarte (v. 57), which the king had won while serving Galfre in Toledo (v.56) by defeating Braymante (v. 58), all according to the tradition already described under § Mainet above.

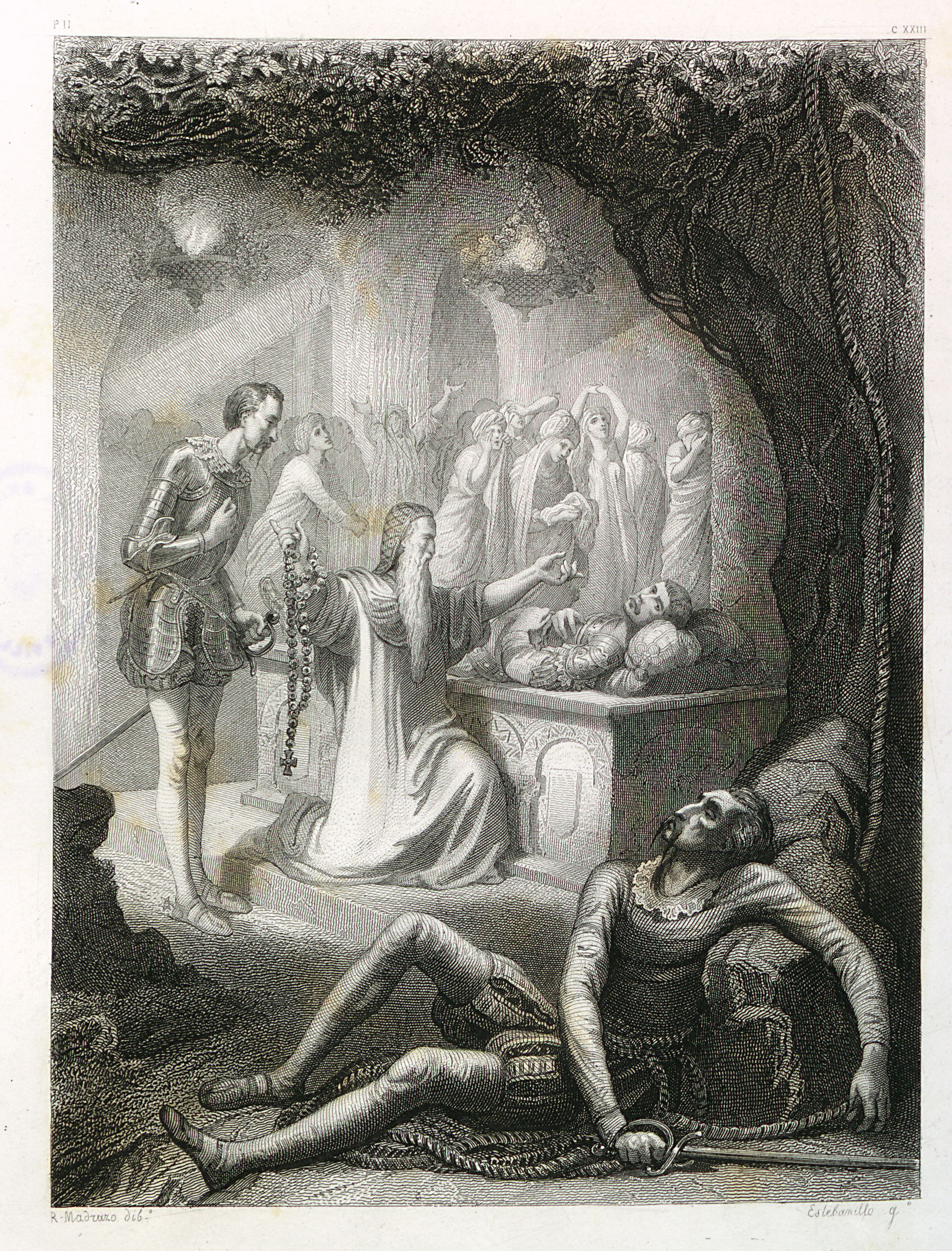
Don Quixote dreams of meeting Montesinos and Durandarte. 1859 illustration by Raimundo Madrazo and Estebanillo.

After the minstrels took license with the material, the sword Durendarte was transformed into a famous knight, fallen at Roncesvalles, entrusting his cousin to carve out as token to his sweetheart, i.e., the romance of Durendarte and lady Belerma. In the second part of Don Quixote, Miguel de Cervantes says that the knight Montesinos is asleep in the Cave of Montesinos, Ossa de Montiel, Castile-La Mancha. The novel makes Don Quixote descend into the cave where he falls asleep. In his dream he is met by Montesinos, his cousin Durandarte, duenna Ruidera, the squire Guadiana and other fantastic characters. Montesinos explains that he carved Durandarte's heart for Belerma upon his death-time request. In a crystal palace, Don Quixote sees Durandarte's tomb, enchanted by "French" Merlin (thus mixing Matter of Britain and Matter of France). Even with his heart removed, Durandarte can magically moan and talk. In his dream, Don Quixote also watches Belerma and her retinue carry Durandarte's preserved heart.

== Origins and previous ownership ==
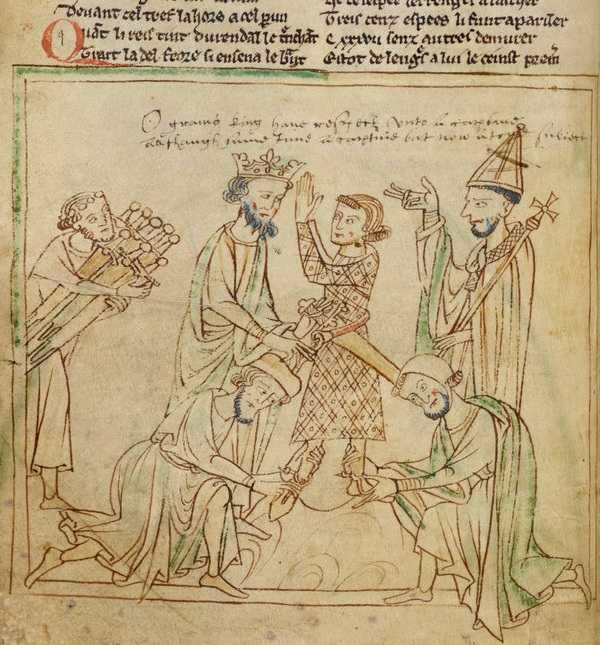
Roland being girt with Durendal by King Charles; Naimon and Ogier attaching his spurs. Rite of knighthood. —Chanson d'Aspremont, Lansdowne MS 782 f23v. Courtesy British Library.

The sword has been given various provenances. Wayland the Smith, pan-European master smith of chivalric romances is its maker in some works of the Matter of France according to one source, but upon closer scrutiny, various works identify the maker as one or other of Wayland's siblings, as clarified below. (Note: The smith Haurifas accord. Mainet and the smith Munificans accord. Fierabras)

According to La Chanson de Roland, an angel brought Durendal to Charlemagne in the vale of Moriane, and Charlemagne then gave it to Roland. (Note: The scene of the angel giving the sword to Karl (Charlemagne) is depicted in a manuscript of Der Stricker's Karl der Große.)

Durendal was once captured, but not kept, by the young Charlemagne when he fled to Spain according to the 12th-century fragmentary chanson de geste Mainet (as already discussed under § Mainet); that Charlemagne aka Mainet won the sword (Durendaus) by slaying Braimant.

While Mainet names Durendal's swordmaker Haurifas as aforementioned, Fierabras claims Durendal was made by his (Aurisas/Hanisars's) brother Munificans, while Doon de Mayence asserts Durendal was made by Galan (Wayland) himself. The beginning of the 12th century Chanson d'Apremont mentions the "sharp Durendal" ascribed to the workmanship of Galant in a variant manuscript (olim Cheltenham ms., now Cod. Bodmer 11 (Note: The former Cheltenham Library ms., now in the Bodmer Library in Cologny near Geneva.)).

According to the Chanson d'Apremont, the owner of Durendal just before Roland obtained it was a Saracen named Aumon[t], son of king Agolant, (Note: This is actually alluded to also in Mainet IV, 39–40 "Et puis la reconquist Rollandins au cuer franc/Quant il occist Yaumont fil le roi Agoulant".). Young Roland mounted Naimes's horse Morel without permission, and armed only with a rod, defeated Aumon, taking as spoils both the sword and the horse Veillantif. Roland was subsequently knighted by Charlemagne via the act of being girt with Durendal (cf. fig. right).

These materials were combined in the Italian prose Aspramonte by Andrea da Barberino in the late 14th to early 15th century. That work stated that after young Carlo (Charlemagne) came into possession of Durindarda (Durendal) by killing Bramante in Spain, Galafro gave it to Galiziella, (Note: Come lo re Galafro.. donò Durindarda a Galiziella "; "..e fu poi di Mainetto, cioè di Carlo; e con spada uccise Carlo lo re Bramante, e chiamavasi Durindarda.. Per questa spada Galiziella col cuore feminile ebbe piatà del re Galafro..", Boni ed. & Barberino (1951), pp. 12–13, Mattaini ed. & Barberino (1957), p. 422.) who then gave it to Almonte the son of Agolante (i.e., French: Aumon). (Note: "Come Galiziella donò Durindarda a Almonte", Boni ed. & Barberino (1951), p. 13.) Galiziella is glossed as the bastard daughter of Agolante, making her Almonte's half-sister. Durindana is eventually won by Orlandino (young Orlando).

Andrea da Barberino was a major source for later Italian writers. Boiardo's Orlando innamorato traces the sword's origin to Hector of Troy; it belonged for a while to the Amazonian queen Pantasilea, and was passed down to Almonte before Orlando gained possession of it. Ludovico Ariosto's Orlando Furioso follows Boiardo, saying it once belonged to Hector of Troy, but that it was given to Roland by Malagigi (Maugris).

== Local lore ==
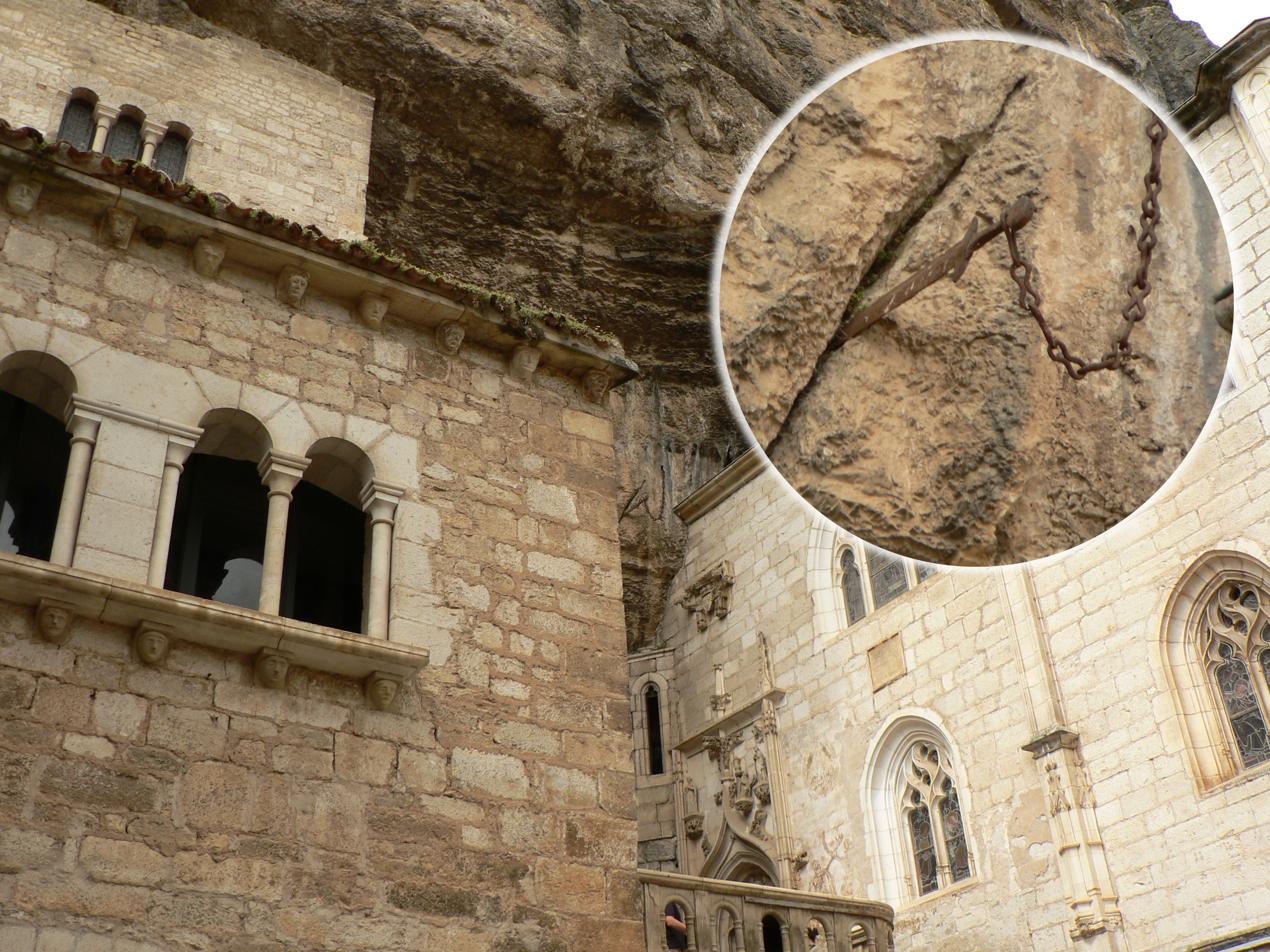
"Durendal" in cliff face at Rocamadour

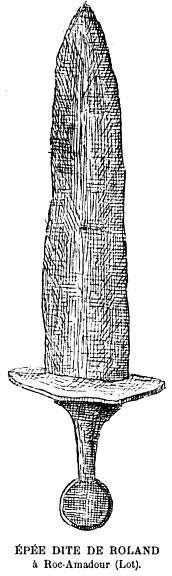
Sword

Tradition has it that Roland's Breach in the Pyrenees was created when Roland, attempting to break Durendal, instead cut a huge gash in the mountainside with one blow. A similar legend is used to explain a notch in the peak of Puig Campana in the Province of Alicante, Spain.

In Rocamadour, in the Lot department, a local legend holds that instead of dying with Durendal hidden under his body, Roland called on the Archangel Michael for assistance and was able to throw the sword several hundred kilometres across the border into France, where it came to rest in Rocamadour. There it was deposited in the chapel of Mary, but was stolen by Henry the Young King in 1183. This Durendal lore was of modern manufacture, and quite unfounded, and the sword itself of poor quality 19th century craftsmanship. But the rumour took hold, and was creating revenue for the local chapter (assembly), so that they, the canons of Rocamadour were reluctant to part with it when approached by the vicomte Jean Blaise d'Anterroches with the prospect of presenting this sword to Prince of Condé, though finally relenting to give it to the Prince around 1787 or 1788. Successive replicas have been stolen; most recently a sword fashioned from sheet metal was embedded in a cleft in a cliff wall, secured with a chain. That sword was reported stolen in June 2024.

== In popular culture ==
=== Games ===
A sword named Durendal appears in several fantasy video games. In Final Fantasy Legend III (1991), it is one of four mystic swords, though its name is shortened to 'Durend' due to character limitations. In the Super Sentai series Kyōryū Sentai Zyuranger (1992), the monster Dora Knight wields a magic sword called Durandal.

Durandal is the name of an artificial intelligence in the Marathon Trilogy (1994−1996) developed by Bungie. (Note: Appearing first in Marathon, Durandal was initially introduced as an antagonist, his self-awareness causing him to collude with the enemy Pfhor when the player attempts to disable his access to important systems pertaining to the UESC Marathon. Beginning in Marathon 2: Durandal, the eponymous artificial intelligence becomes an ally with the player and the S'pht, a slave race of the Pfhor that was freed in the previous game, as he believes the S'pht homeworld of Lh'owon can give him insight into escaping the ultimate death of the universe and become a god like the Jjaro, a race of advanced extraterrestrials that have since disappeared. In the final installment, Marathon Infinity, as a consequence of the reality hopping abilities of both the technology of the Jjaro and the W'rkncacnter, an eldritch being once imprisoned within the sun of the S'pht System that was freed when the Pfhor destroyed the sun, Durandal can serve as either an ally or an enemy to the player.)

In the Fire Emblem video game series, Durandal is a greatsword known as the "Blazing Blade" and the Divine Weapon of the Champion Roland, one of the Eight Legends and founder of the Lycian League. In Fire Emblem: The Binding Blade (2002), Durandal is the first Divine Weapon obtained by Roy and his army. In the prequel Fire Emblem: The Blazing Blade (2003), it can only be used by Eliwood, the father of Roy and a descendant of Roland.

Durandal is the name of a character in Honkai Impact 3rd (2016); her namesake is the super-AI Holy Blade Durandal, which takes the form of a sword. In Library of Ruina (2020), Durandal is the signature weapon of Roland, one of the main protagonists. A sword named Durandal is in Chained Echoes (2022), as well as the game Days Bygone. In Genshin Impact (2020), Durandarte is one of the weapons once wielded by Roland, the Bloodstained Knight.

In Terraria, Durendal is a weapon that the player is able to craft, but it is a whip rather than a sword. Durendal is the name of a spaceship in Xenosaga and of an organization in Front Mission 4. The name also appears in Fate/Grand Order (2015).

=== Literature ===
In the xianxia-inspired series of novels The Godking's Legacy, Durandal is the name of one of the main characters, a sentient sword that previously belonged to the legendary warrior-mage Roland. In The Dresden Files book series, Durendal is one of three powerful swords and is linked to the emotion of hope. In the light novel and anime series High School DxD, the historical Durandal that was first used by Roland is currently wielded by Xenovia. In One Piece, Durandal is a rapier wielded by Cavendish.

== Eponymy ==
Durandal was a G1-winning thoroughbred racehorse in Japan.

Gilbert Durandal is the name of a character in the anime series Mobile Suit Gundam SEED, Macross Frontier, and Space Battleship Tiramisu, as well as a character in the live-action tokusatsu series Kamen Rider Saber (2020) and its spinoff Kamen Rider Sabela & Durendal (2022).

The Matra Durandal is a runway penetrating dual warhead bomb designed to deny the use of a runway by displacing large slabs of the runway as well as cratering it.
