= Roland (statue) =

Type of statue

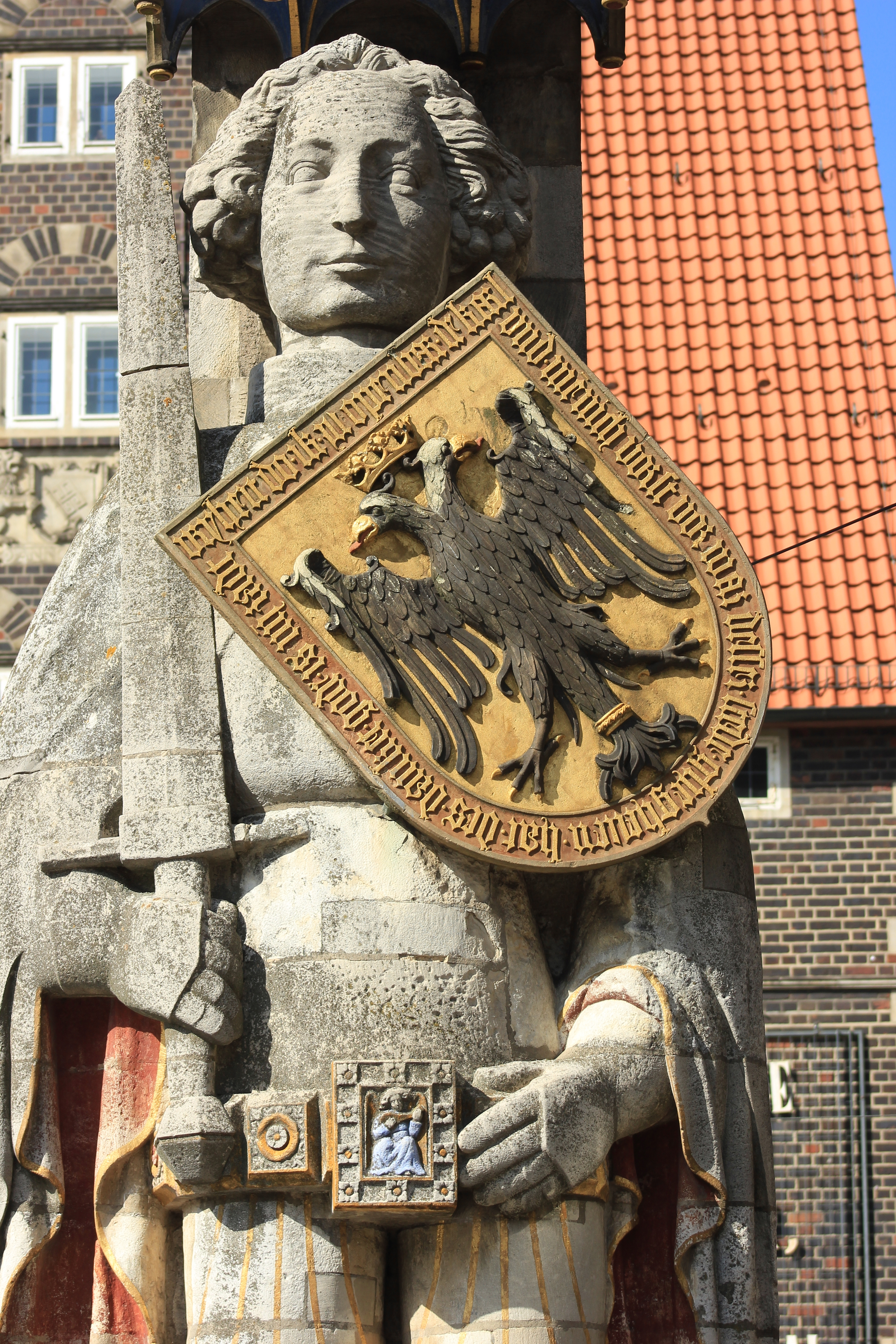
The Bremen Roland, erected in 1404, forms part of a World Heritage Site

A Roland statue is a statue of a knight with a drawn sword, signifying the town privileges of a medieval city. Such statues exist in a number of cities notably in northern and eastern Germany, where they are often placed on the market square or in front of the city hall. Examples are also known from Central Europe, Croatia and Latvia, and there are copies in Brazil and the United States. Statues of the mythological Roland, who enjoyed the status as a popular hero, were erected in cities during the Middle Ages as an emblem of the freedom and city rights of a town. In Germany, such a town is sometimes known as a Roland town (German: Rolandstadt). Philippe Dollinger notes that although there are several Roland statues in the Baltic Sea area, there is nothing specifically Hanseatic about them. Rather, Roland statues are known mainly from cities that used Saxon Law.

== History ==
The first Roland statues began to appear in the 12th century, placed outside churches. During the 14th and 15th centuries, Roland statues became more common. Especially during the reign of the Holy Roman Emperor Charles IV, such statues became more common, a fact that may be explained by the Emperor's ambition to portray himself as the heir to Charlemagne's reign. The earliest Roland statues were made of wood, while later examples were more often made of stone.

== See also ==
- Perron, a similar kind of historical civic monument found in Belgium
