= Jean Bagnyon =

Jean Bagnyon or Jehan Bagnyon was a lawyer, historian, political writer, and translator born in 1412, in Croy, in the canton of Vaud, which was, at that time, a part of the Duchy of Savoy. He died sometime after 1487.

== Biography ==
A citizen of Lausanne with a bachelor in law, Jean Bagnyon began his law career as a conscindic (syndic) in Lausanne, but the city's fiscal difficulties forced him to move to Geneva. In 1481, he was chosen by Lausanne to represent the city's proposal to unite with its lower city.

In 1486, he wrote a treatise in Latin — Tractatus de et super libertatibus, franchesiis, preeminenciis ac exemptionibus a subjectione dominiorum temporalium eminentis fructifere et solaciose civitatis Gebennarum, (Treatise on the freedoms, franchise, preeminences and exceptions from subjugation by worldly dominations of the eminent, fecund, and delightful city of Geneva), probably the oldest lay legal work printed in French-speaking Switzerland — with the goal of defending the rights of the city of Geneva and of proving that the city was not ruled by the Duke of Savoy, but instead that its inhabitants were subjects of the Bishop. This work was only published some years later. He was awarded Geneva citizenship for his work favoring Genevan freedoms in the tax conflicts of 1486-1487.

Bagnyon's principle work was a history of Charlemagne which included a prose adaptation of the chanson de geste Fierabras -- La Conqueste du grand roy Charlemagne des Espagnes et les vaillances des douze pairs de France, et aussi celles de Fierabras—which had been requested of him as early as 1465 by Henri Bolomier or Bolmier, the canon of the chapters of Lausanne and Geneva, future confessor of Philibert I, Duke of Savoy (1465-1482). The work was first published in Geneva in 1478 without a title except the informal one suggested by the explicit stating "Here ends the Rommant de Fierabras le geant", then adopted the long title as of the Lyons edition of 1497 (it was perhaps the first chanson de geste to be printed). La Conqueste du grand roy Charlemagne des Espagnes contains a brief history of the kings of France until Clovis, an encomium of Charlemagne and brief history of his reign, his trip to Jerusalem, the story of Fierabras, and Charlemagne's Spanish wars. The historical sections were largely based on the Historia Caroli Magni (also known as the "Pseudo-Turpin" chronicle), probably known to Bagnyon via the Speculum Historiale of Vincent de Beauvais, but the story of Fierabras occupies most of the work. This work became one of the most popular novels in France in the first half of the 16th century (15 editions printed to 1536) and was adapted into English by William Caxton and published as The Hystory and Lyf of the Noble and Chrysten Prynce Charles the Grete (1485), followed by Castilian Spanish by Nicolas de Piemonte as Historia del emperador Carlomagno y de los doce pares de Francia (Séville, 1521). as well as Portuguese, German adaptations, to be published numerous times up to the 19th century.

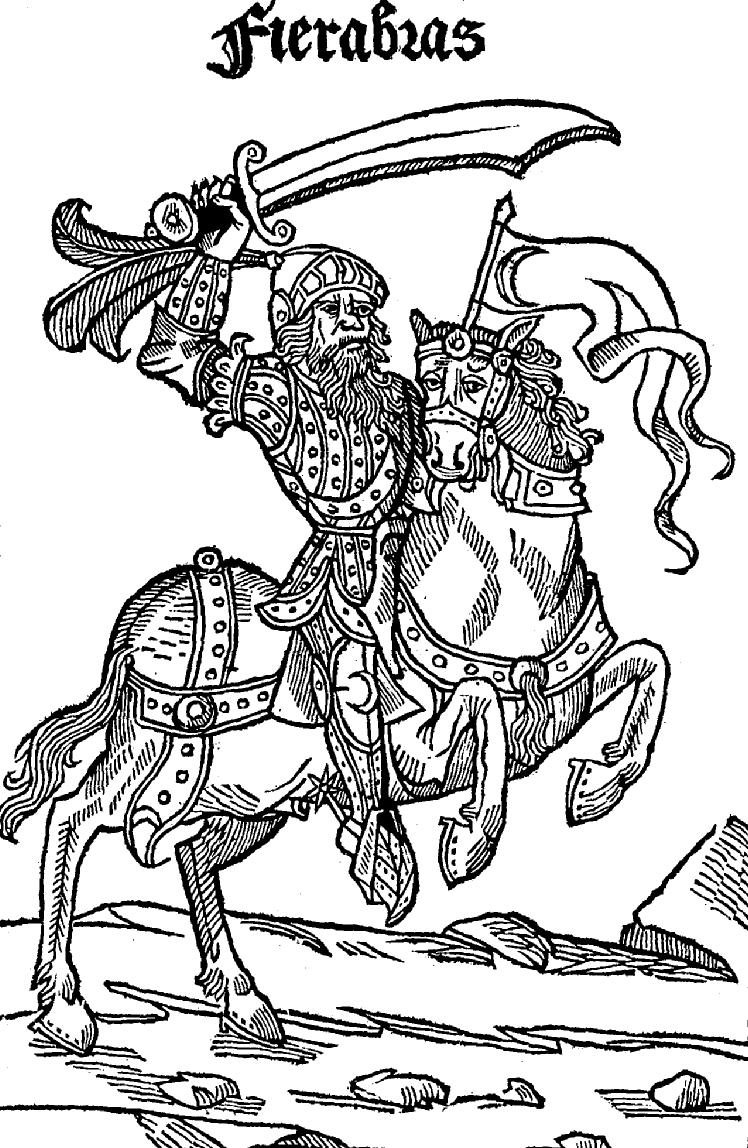
The giant Fierabras, engraving from the 1497 edition of Jean Bagnyon's Roman de Fierabras le Géant (P. Maréchal et B. Chaussard, Lyon), BNF RES-Y2-993

Jean Bagnyon shows himself a talented storyteller with a structured and unified storyline around his subject matter, without digressions. The fantasy elements of the original tales are attenuated and the moral questions are emphasized in authorial commentaries that show the author's mastery of rhetoric. He also makes references to classical texts and often cites the Bible.
