= Andrea da Barberino =

Italian writer (c. 1370 – 1431)

Andrea Mangiabotti, called Andrea da Barberino (c. 1370–1431), was an Italian writer and cantastorie ("storyteller") of the Quattrocento Renaissance. He was born in Barberino Val d'Elsa, near Florence, and lived in Florence. He is principally known for his prose romance epic Il Guerrin Meschino, his I Reali di Francia ("The Royal House of France"), a prose compilation (in the form of a chronicle) of the Matter of France epic material concerning Charlemagne and Roland (Orlandino) from various legends and chansons de geste, and for his Aspramonte, a reworking of the chanson de geste Aspremont, which also features the hero Ruggiero. Many of his writings probably derive from Franco-Italian works, such as the Geste Francor, that includes versions of the stories of Reali di Francia and dates to the first half of the fourteenth century. His works, which circulated at first in manuscript, were extremely successful and popular, and were a key source of material for later Italian romance writers, such as Luigi Pulci (Morgante), Matteo Maria Boiardo (Orlando Innamorato) and Ludovico Ariosto (Orlando Furioso).

== Works ==
Andrea da Barberino wrote the following works:

- I Reali di Francia ("The Royal House of France")
- Il Guerrin Meschino
- Ajolfo del Barbicone (reworking of the French Aiol)
- Ugone d'Alvernia (adaptation of the Franco-Italian chanson de geste Huon d'Auvergne, with the first chapter of the final book alternating terza rima and prose in the published edition)
- Storie Nerbonesi (prose adaptation on the Old French chanson de geste Narbonnais and eight other chansons concerning Aymeri de Narbonne and Guillaume d'Orange)
- [Le Storie d']Aspramonte (adaptation of the Old French chanson de geste Aspremont
- Ansuigi (possibly also by Andrea)
