= Roland =

Frankish military leader under Charlemagne

- Hrōþiland
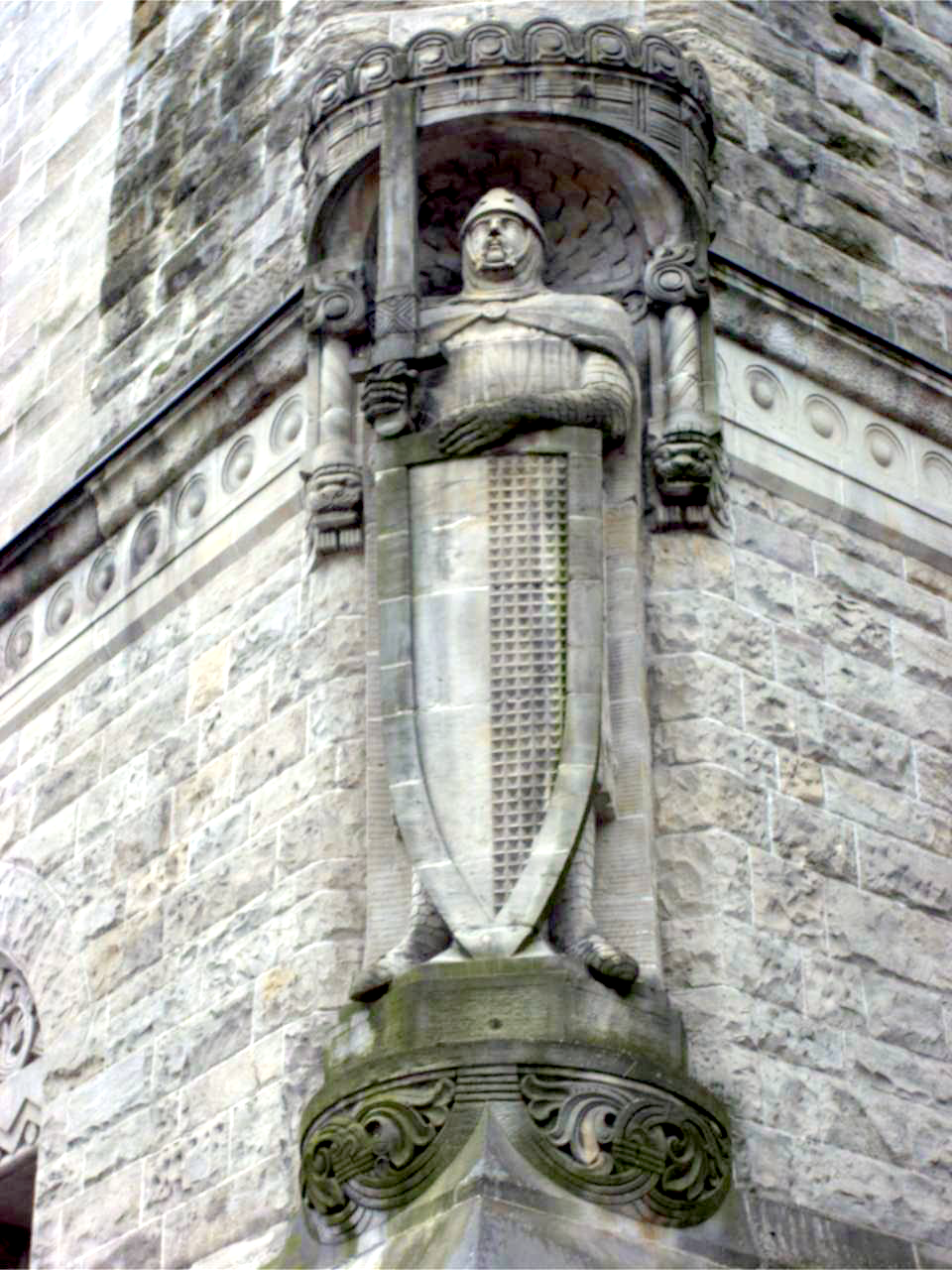
- A statue of Roland at Metz railway station, France
- Died: 15 August 778
- Burial place: Blaye
- Military career
- Allegiance: Frankish

Roland (French pronunciation: [ʁɔ.lɑ̃]; Old Frankish: *Hrōþiland; Medieval Latin: Hruodlandus or Rotholandus; Italian: Orlando or Rolando; died 15 August 778) was a Frankish military leader under Charlemagne who became an epic hero and one of the principal figures in the literary cycle known as the Matter of France. The historical Roland was military governor of the Breton March, responsible for defending Francia's frontier against the Bretons. His only historical attestation is in Einhard's Vita Karoli Magni, which notes he was part of the Frankish rearguard killed in retribution by the Basques in Iberia at the Battle of Roncevaux Pass.

The story of Roland's death at Roncevaux Pass was embellished in later medieval and Renaissance literature. The first and most famous of these epic treatments was the Old French Chanson de Roland of the 11th century.

Two masterpieces of Italian Renaissance poetry, the Orlando Innamorato and Orlando Furioso (by Matteo Maria Boiardo and Ludovico Ariosto, respectively), are even further detached from history than the earlier Chansons, similarly to the later Morgante by Luigi Pulci. Roland is poetically associated with his sword Durendal, his horse Veillantif, and his oliphant horn.

In the late 17th century, French Baroque composer Jean-Baptiste Lully wrote an opera titled Roland, based on the story of the title character.

== History ==
The only historical mention of the actual Roland is in the Vita Karoli Magni by Charlemagne's courtier and biographer Einhard. Einhard refers to him as Hruodlandus Brittannici limitis praefectus ("Roland, prefect of the borders of Brittany"), indicating that he presided over the Breton March, Francia's border territory against the Bretons. The passage, which appears in Chapter 9, mentions that Hroudlandus (a Latinization of the Frankish *Hrōþiland, from *hrōþi, "praise"/"fame" and *land, "country") was among those killed in the Battle of Roncevaux Pass:

While he was vigorously pursuing the Saxon war, almost without a break, and after he had placed garrisons at selected points along the border, [Charles] marched into Spain [in 778] with as large a force as he could mount. His army passed through the Pyrenees and [Charles] received the surrender of all the towns and fortified places he encountered. He was returning [to Francia] with his army safe and intact, but high in the Pyrenees on that return trip he briefly experienced the Basques. That place is so thoroughly covered with thick forest that it is the perfect spot for an ambush. [Charles's] army was forced by the narrow terrain to proceed in a long line and [it was at that spot], high on the mountain, that the Basques set their ambush. [...] The Basques had the advantage in this skirmish because of the lightness of their weapons and the nature of the terrain, whereas the Franks were disadvantaged by the heaviness of their arms and the unevenness of the land. Eggihard, the overseer of the king's table, Anselm, the count of the palace, and Roland, the lord of the Breton March, along with many others died in that skirmish. But this deed could not be avenged at that time, because the enemy had so dispersed after the attack that there was no indication as to where they could be found.

Roland was evidently the first official appointed to direct Frankish policy in Breton affairs, as local Franks under the Merovingian dynasty had not previously pursued any specific relationship with the Bretons. Their frontier castle districts such as Vitré, Ille-et-Vilaine, south of Mont Saint-Michel, are now divided between Normandy and Brittany. The distinctive culture of this region preserves the present-day Gallo language and legends of local heroes such as Roland. Roland's successor in Brittania Nova was Guy of Nantes, who like Roland, was unable to exert Frankish expansion over Brittany and merely sustained a Breton presence in the Carolingian Empire.

According to legend, Roland was laid to rest in the basilica at Blaye, near Bordeaux, on the site of the Citadel de Blaye.

== Medieval icon ==
Roland was turned into a popular and iconic figure of medieval Europe and its minstrel culture. Many tales made him a nephew of Charlemagne and turned his life into an epic tale of the noble Christian killed by hostile forces, which forms part of the medieval Matter of France.

The tale of Roland's death is retold in the 11th-century poem The Song of Roland, where he is equipped with the olifant (a signaling horn) and an unbreakable sword, enchanted by various Christian relics, named Durendal. The Song contains a highly romanticized account of the Battle of Roncevaux Pass and Roland's death, setting the tone for later fantastical depiction of Charlemagne's court.

It was adapted and modified throughout the Middle Ages, including an influential Latin prose version Historia Caroli Magni (latterly known as the Pseudo-Turpin Chronicle), which also includes Roland's battle with a Saracen giant named Ferracutus who is only vulnerable at his navel. The story was later adapted in the anonymous Franco-Venetian epic L'Entrée d'Espagne (c. 1320) and in the 14th-century Italian epic La Spagna, attributed to the Florentine Sostegno di Zanobi and likely composed between 1350 and 1360.

Other texts give further legendary accounts of Roland's life. His friendship with Olivier and his engagement with Olivier's sister Aude are told in Girart de Vienne by Bertrand de Bar-sur-Aube. Roland's youth and the acquisition of his horse Veillantif and sword are described in Aspremont. Roland also appears in Quatre Fils Aymon, where he is contrasted with Renaud de Montauban against whom he occasionally fights.

In Norway, the tales of Roland are part of the 13th-century Karlamagnús saga.

In the Divine Comedy Dante sees Roland, named Orlando as is usual in Italian literature, in the Heaven of Mars together with others who fought for the faith.

Roland appears in Entrée d'Espagne, a 14th-century Franco-Venetian chanson de geste (in which he is transformed into a knight errant, similar to heroes from the Arthurian romances) and La Spagna, a 14th-century Italian epic.

From the 15th century onwards, Roland appears as a central character in a sequence of Italian verse romances as "Orlando", including Morgante by Luigi Pulci, Orlando Innamorato by Matteo Maria Boiardo, and Orlando Furioso by Ludovico Ariosto. (See below for his later history in Italian verse.) The Orlandino of Pietro Aretino then waxed satirical about the "cult of personality" of Orlando the hero. The Orlando narrative inspired several composers, amongst whom were Claudio Monteverdi, Jean-Baptiste Lully, Antonio Vivaldi and George Frideric Handel, who composed an Italian-language opera with Orlando.

In Germany, Roland gradually became a symbol of the independence of the growing cities from the local nobility. In the late Middle Ages, many cities featured defiant statues of Roland in their marketplaces. The Roland in Wedel was erected in 1450 as symbol of market and Hanseatic justice, and the Roland statue in front of Bremen City Hall (1404) has been listed together with the city hall itself on the UNESCO list of World Heritage Sites since 2004.

In the Faroe Islands, Roland appears in the ballad of "Runtsivalstríðið" (Battle of Roncevaux).

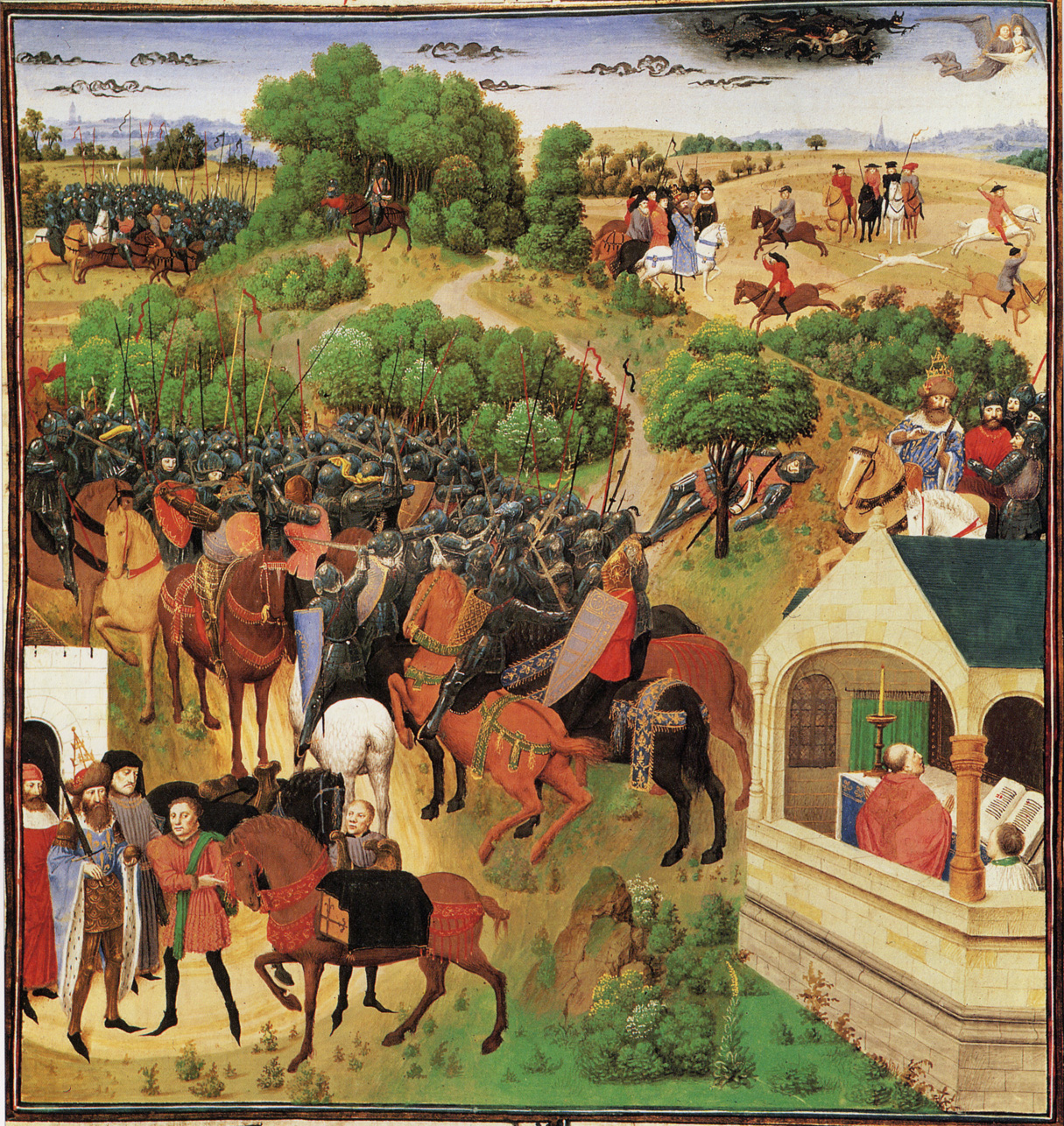
The eight phases of The Song of Roland in one picture

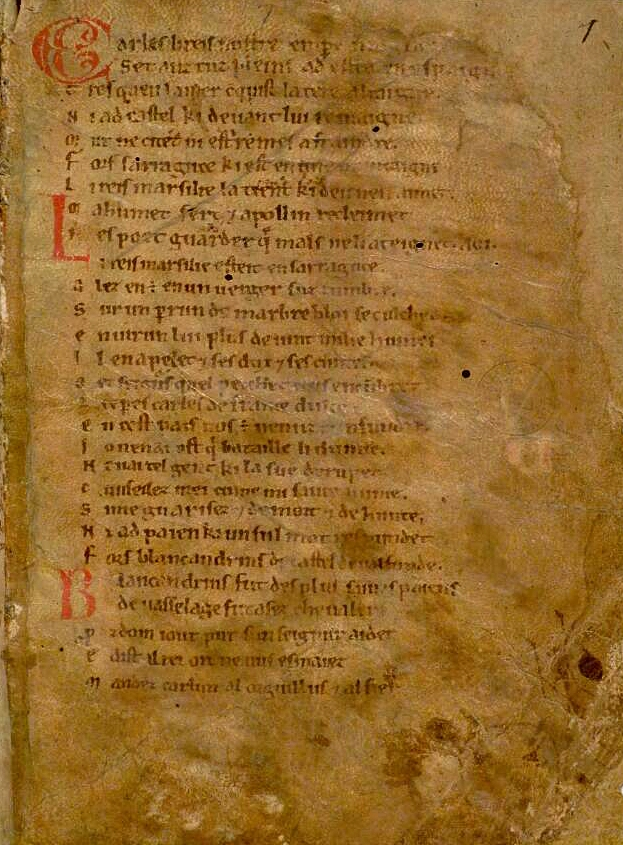
Composed in 1098, the first page of the Chanson de Roland (Song of Roland)

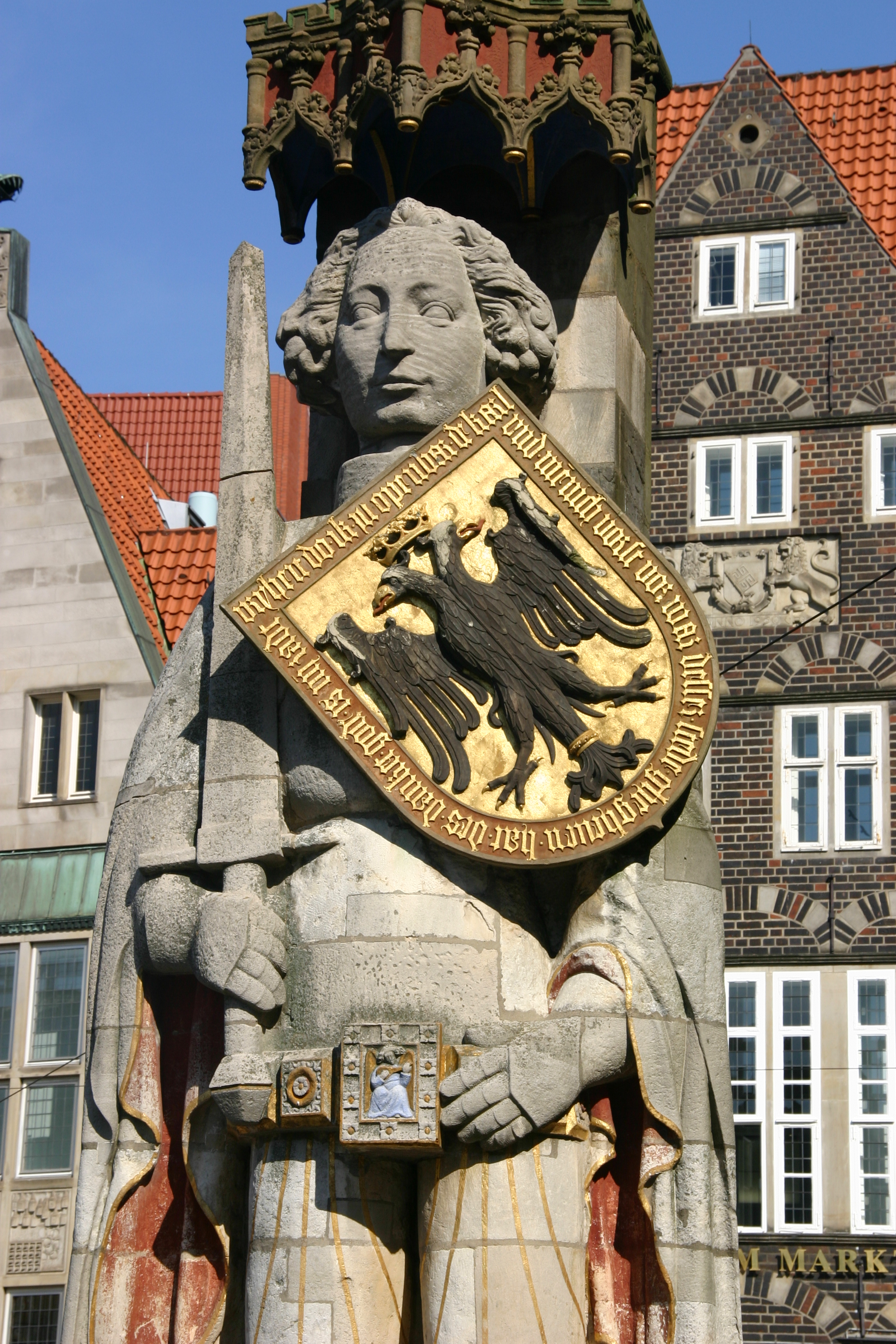
Roland statues, like the one in Bremen, became popular symbols of municipal independence during the Middle Ages.

Attributed arms according to Michel Pastoureau: D'or au lion de gueules, à la bordure engrêlées de sable

== Legacy ==
In Aragón there are several placenames related to Roldán or Rolando, including the mountain pass Roland's Breach on the border to France and the rock formation Salto de Roldán.

In Catalonia Roland (or Rotllà, as it is rendered in Catalan) became a legendary giant. Numerous places in Catalonia (both North and South) have a name related to Rotllà. In step with the trace left by the character in the whole Pyrenean area, Basque Errolan turns up in numerous legends and place-names associated with a mighty giant, usually a heathen, capable of launching huge stones. The Basque word erraldoi (giant) stems from Errol(d)an, as pointed out by the linguist Koldo Mitxelena.

Jean Lannes, a Marshal of the First French Empire, was given the nickname Roland de l'Armée d'Italie, which later became Roland de la Grande Armée, for his bravery and charisma.

A statue of Roland stands in the city of Rolândia in Brazil. The city was established by German immigrants, many of them refugees from Nazi Germany, who named their new home after Roland to represent freedom.

Roland is a servant in the game Fate/Grand Order, portrayed as a faithful servant to God and a righteous paladin.

Roland also serves as one of the protagonists of the South Korean video game Library of Ruina, with many elements taken from his appearances in Orlando Innamorato and Orlando Furioso.

The character "A Knight" in the video game Reverse: 1999 references, and is heavily implied to be Roland, including reciting the Rolandskvadet in his voice lines.

The video game Final Fantasy Tactics has a character named Cidolfus Orlandeau (or Cidolfas Orlandu), whose surname is derived from Orlando, the Italian name for Roland. Orlandeau is a general in one of Ivalice's knightly orders, the Order of the Southern Sky, and a hero in the Fifty Years' War. Orlandeau is widely considered the most powerful story unit in the game, with his default job the Sword Saint (or Holy Swordsman), which combines all the sword techniques of three other story units' special jobs and deals considerably more damage with all of those.

The English expression "to give a Roland for an Oliver", meaning either to offer a quid pro quo or to give as good as one gets, recalls the Chanson de Roland and Roland's companion Oliver.

The video game Honkai Impact 3rd has a character named Rowland, who also has a sword called Durandl.

== Sources ==
- Lojek, A. – Adamová, K.: "About Statues of Rolands in Bohemia", Journal on European History of Law, Vol. 3/2012, No. 1, s. 136–138. (ISSN 2042-6402).
- Adriana Kremenjas-Danicic (ed.): Roland's European Paths. Europski dom Dubrovnik, Dubrovnik 2006 (ISBN 953-95338-0-5).
- Susan P. Millinger, "Epic Values: The Song of Roland", in Jason Glenn (ed), The Middle Ages in Texts and Texture: Reflections on Medieval Sources (Toronto, University of Toronto, 2012).
