= Reinold =

Saint Reinold
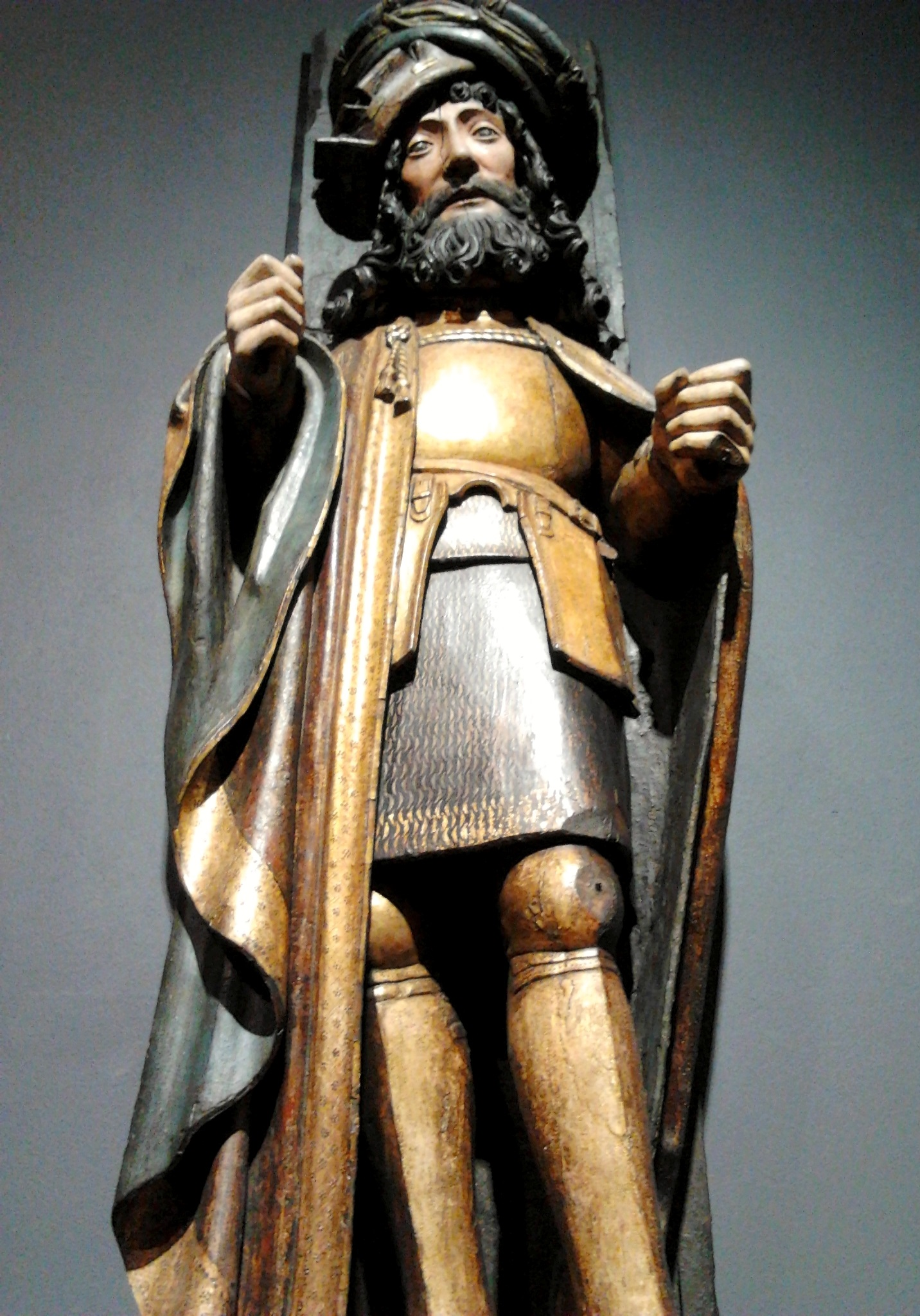

Martyr
- Died: ca. 960
- Venerated in: Roman Catholic Church, Lutheran Church
- Feast: 7 January
- Attributes: body armor, holding a shield
- Patronage: stonemasons

Reinold (also known as Reinoldus, Reinhold of Cologne or in German Reinhold von Köln) was a Benedictine monk who lived in the 10th century. Supposedly a direct descendant of Charlemagne, and the fourth son mentioned in the romantic poem Duke Aymon, by William Caxton. The poem is Caxton's translation of the long French Chanson de Geste, Les Quatre Fils Aymon (The Four Sons of Aymon), where Renaud de Montauban dies in an almost identical manner.

Reinold began his religious life by entering the Benedictine monastery of Pantaleon in Cologne, where he was appointed head of a building project occurring in the abbey. He often joined the stonemasons in their work, at times surpassing them. This led to the unsavoury event of his murder at the hands of the same stonemasons he worked with. Reinold was beaten to death with hammers and his body deposited into a pool near the Rhine. His body was later found through divine means, leading to the attribution of Reinold as the patron saint of stonemasons.

St. Reinold's Church, Dortmund is dedicated to him; he is the patron saint of the city.
