= Flamberge =

Type of sword

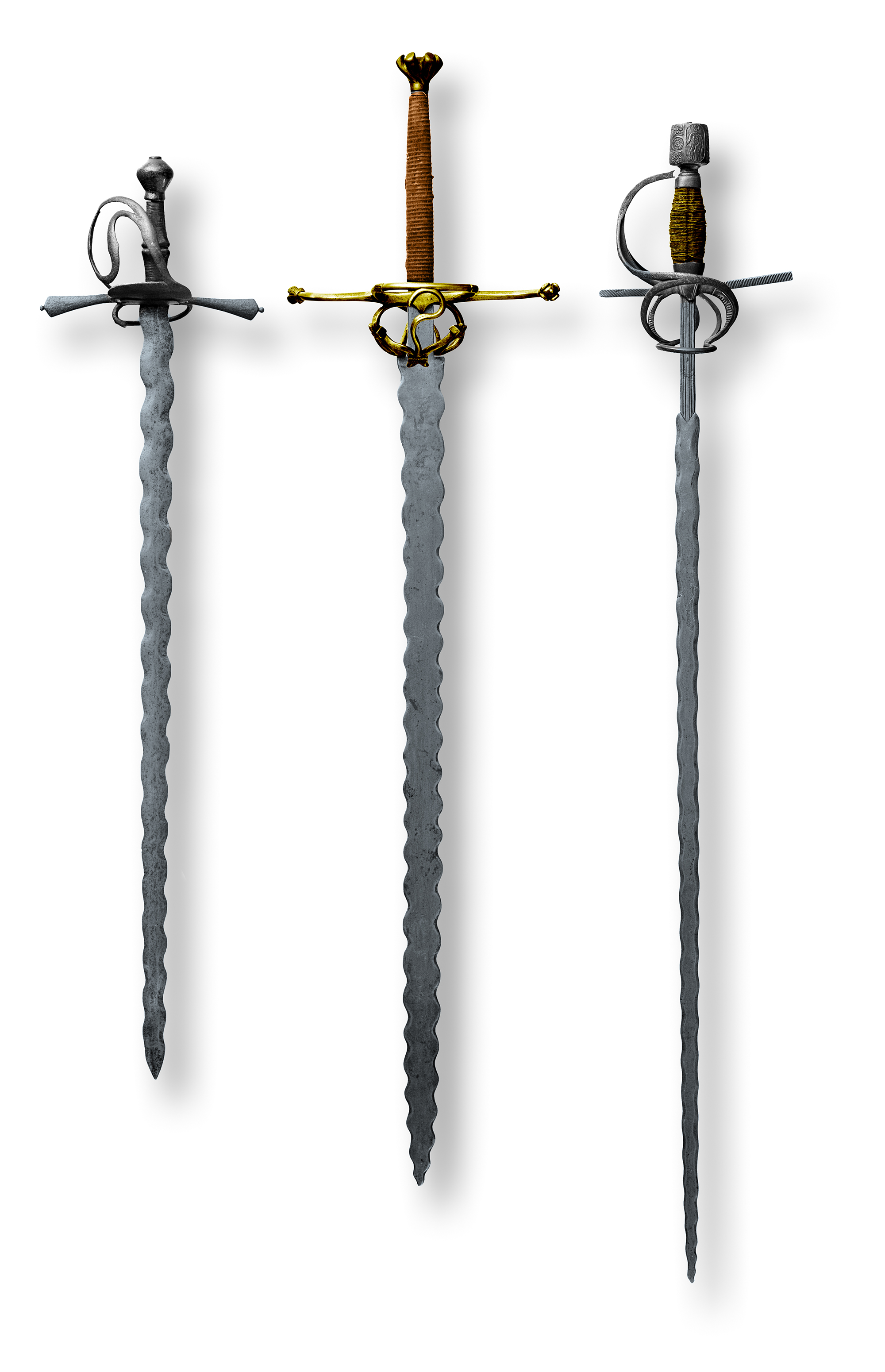
Three flamberge examples

A flamberge (also floberge, froberge, and other variations) is a medieval sword that is swung by a number of fictional heroes of chansons de geste and romances, and the word became a generic name for a large sword.

In early texts, the words "floberge" and "froberge" (Italian: fusberta or frusberta) are used, but the name developed under the influence of the word "flamber". Swords by that name are wielded by Renaud de Montauban (and his cousin Maugris) in The Four Sons of Aymon (12th century); Antenor in the Roman de Troie (12th century); Begon, the brother of the eponymous hero of Garin le Loherain (12th century); and the hero of Galien le Restoré (15th century).

In early-20th-century works, swords of the name were wielded by Dom Manuel of James Branch Cabell's Biography of the Life of Manuel and by Prince Valiant.

Flamberge ("flaming"), from the French flamber, has many connotations, including swords without a flamed blade. The term is a frequent name or alias for swords in medieval chansons de geste and romances, where it often denotes a large sword. Egerton Castle used the term to refer to swords that were a transition from the rapier to the smallsword. These swords did not necessarily have an undulated blade, a feature that was added to increase profuse bleeding in victims. According to Castle, this is the case in some Swiss rapiers, but flamberge quickly became a disdainful term in France to refer to flamboyant swords. This comes from the French expression Mettre flamberge au vent, meaning "To put [the sword] in the wind". Here, it is suggested the wielder of the sword likened it to the mythical sword Durendal, which alternatively was called Flamberge.
