= St. Reinold's Church, Dortmund =

Church in Dortmund, Germany

Coordinates: 51°30′53″N 7°28′03″E

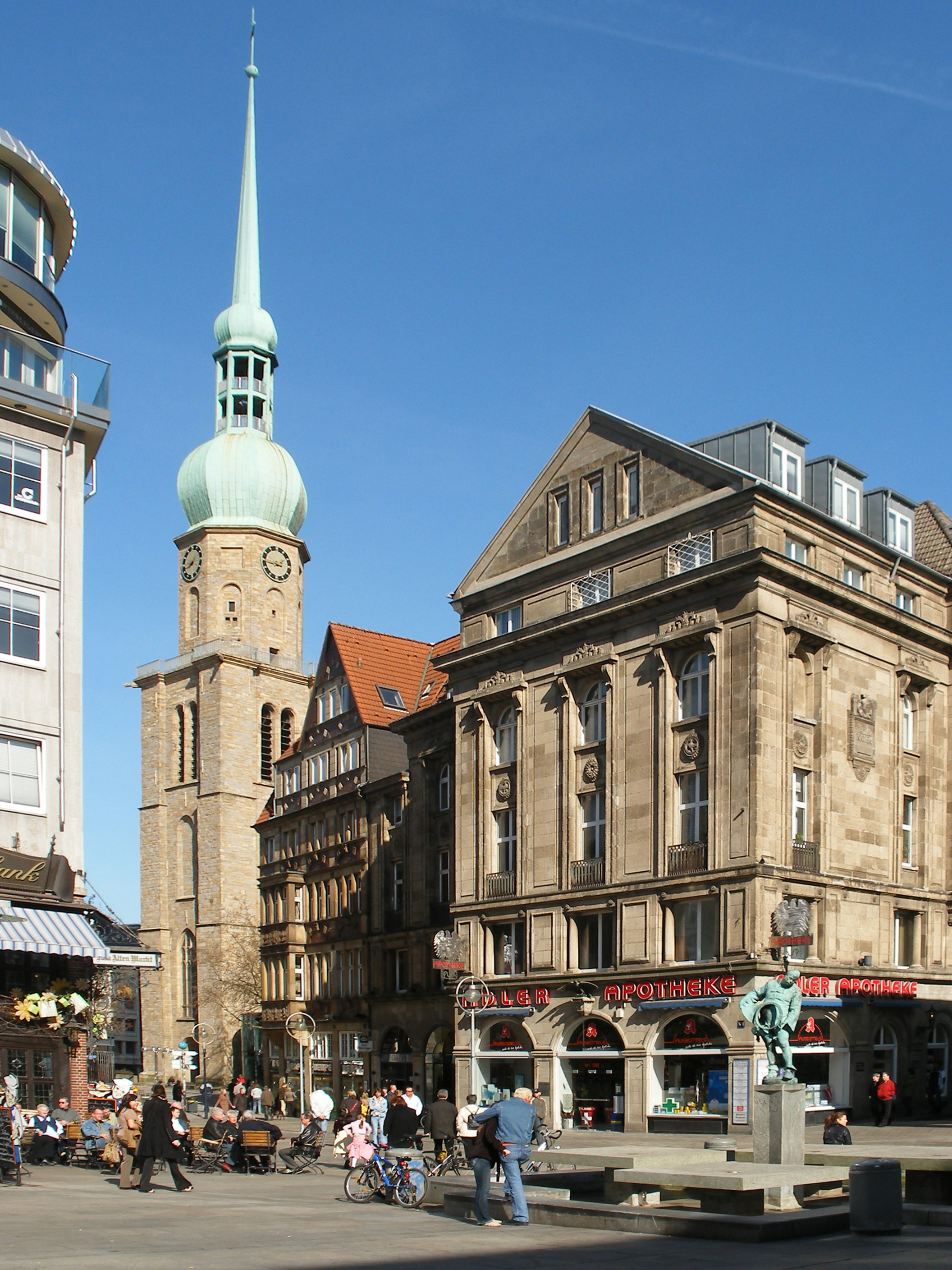
Old market square with St. Reinold's Church

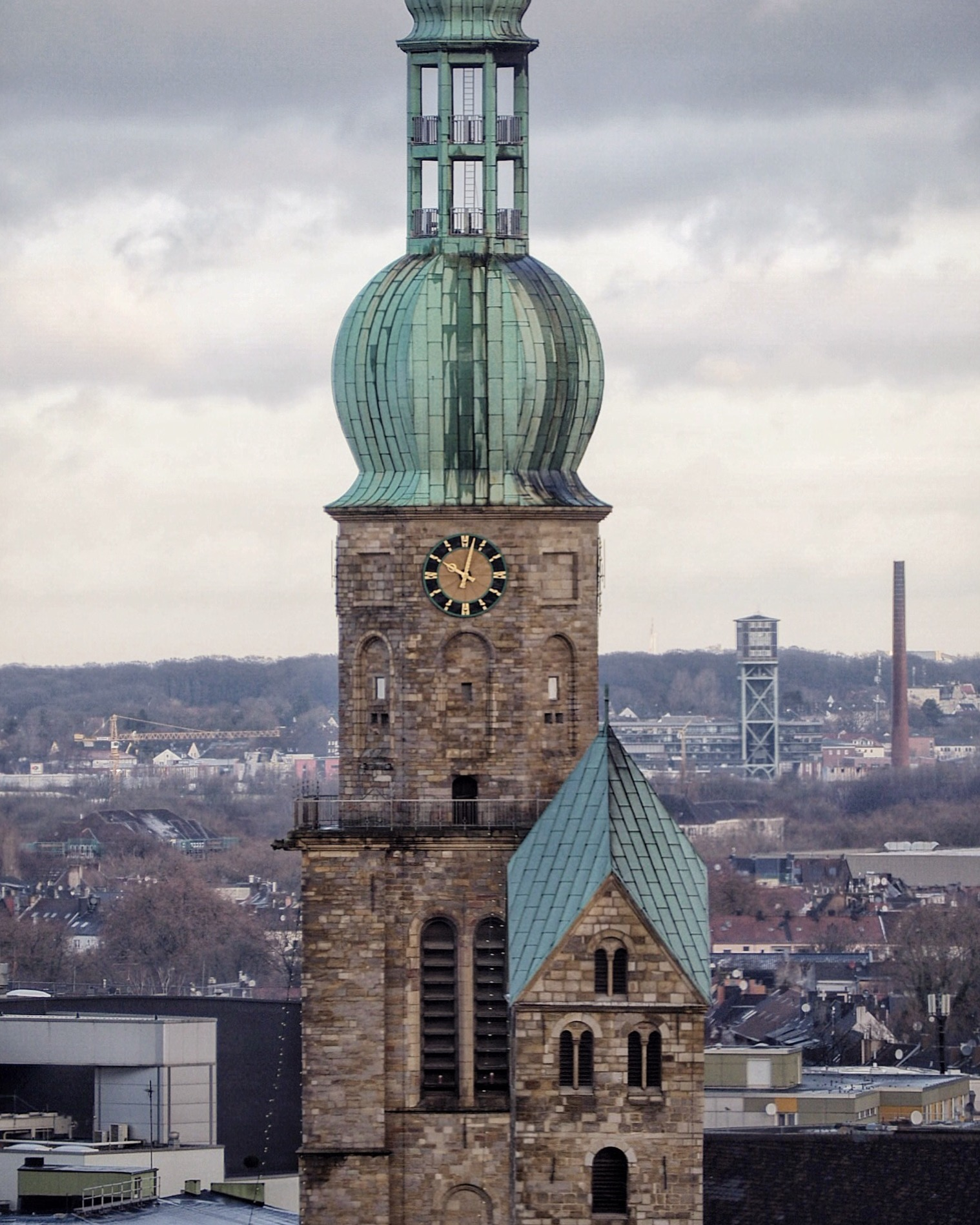
St. Reinolds and St. Mary Church

The Lutheran Protestant Church of St. Reinold (German: Reinoldikirche) is, according to its foundation date, the oldest extant church in Dortmund, Germany; it is dedicated to Reinold, also known as Renaud de Montauban, the patron of the city. The church was built as a palatine church in the Ottonian era. The present building is a late Romanesque church with a late gothic quire. St. Reinold's was built from 1250 to 1270, and is located in the centre of the city, directly at the crossing of the Hellweg (a historic trade route) and the historic road from Cologne to Bremen. St. Reinoldi's congregation is a member of the Evangelical Church of Westphalia, an umbrella comprising Lutheran, Reformed and united Protestant congregations.

Efforts to complete the tower of St. Reinold's were renewed in 1443. After its completion in 1454, it was 112 m (367 ft) tall and was referred to as the "Miracle of Westphalia". The polygonal spire was renovated the first time in 1519. On 24 June 1520, the copper roofing was completed, and on 27 July the spire was added. The apex of the church was now about seven metres higher. In 1562 the pastors and congregations of Dortmund confirmed their adoption of Lutheranism in St. Reinold's Church. In 1661, the tower collapsed after being damaged during an earthquake. The foundation for the new tower was laid 1662, and the building was completed 1701, with a baroque ornament on the top.

The church was heavily damaged in World War II. Since the reconstruction the tower now bears a hood with baroque features similar to the original one, but increased in height (together with the tower as a whole) to correspond with the increased height of the surrounding modern buildings in the city centre. These features supply a visual and harmonious connection between the original style of the church and its appearance after reconstruction. The tower of St. Reinold's Church (today's height: 104 m (341 ft)) can be visited, up to the first platform by the bell tower.

On the inside there is a large set of bells, made by the "Bochumer Verein" foundry (total weight: 20 t), built in 1954 with altogether 6 steel bells. Their cost at the time of creation was DM 90,500. The heaviest bell (Pitch: f°) weighing 6.500 kg, and measuring 2.50 m in diameter, is the largest cast steel bell in Westphalia.

In December 2016, nine neo-Nazis from various German cities who were associated with the Die Rechte right wing group occupied the church steeple and appeared to set off fireworks from it. The members were subsequently taken into custody by police. Neo-Nazi slogans shouted from the steeple through a megaphone were drowned out by the church bells, ordered to be rung by the vicar of St. Reinold's. The illegal occupation of the church's tower was met with disbelief and anger from the church's spokespersons and the vast majority of the public.
