= Bayard (legend) =

Magical horse in Medieval and Renaissance poetry

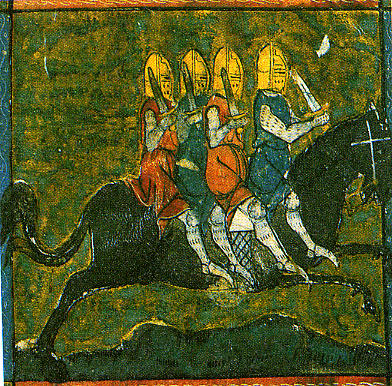
The horse Bayard carrying the four sons of Aymon, miniature in a manuscript from the 14th century.

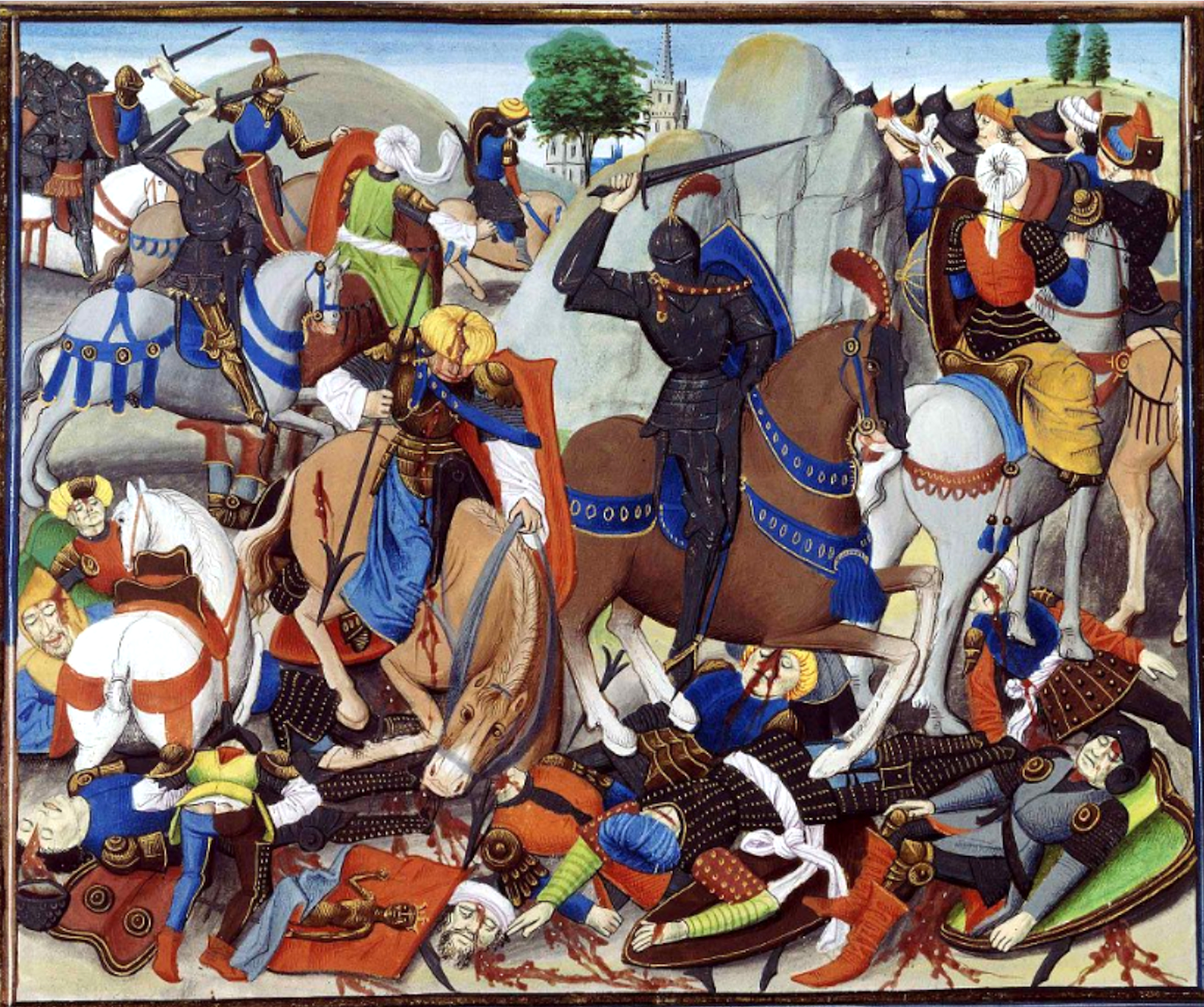
Maugis on his horse Bayard, fighting against the Infidels, in Renaud de Montauban. Loyset Liédet, Bruges, 1462-1470

Bayard (Modern French: [bajaʁ]; Dutch: Ros Beiaard or just Beiaard; Italian: Baiardo) is a magical bay horse in legends derived from the medieval chansons de geste. These texts, especially that of The Four Sons of Aymon, attribute to him magical qualities and a supernatural origin. He is known for his strength and intelligence, and possesses the supernatural ability to adjust his size to his riders.

Since the Middle Ages, Bayard has been an important figure in northern French and Belgian folklore, particularly in the Ardennes, notably in Bogny-sur-Meuse, Dinant, Namur and Dendermonde. Folk processions stage it among the processional giants, namely the Ducasse d'Ath and the Ommegang van Dendermonde. The widespread dissemination of his legend and its success have influenced many artists, as well as popular beliefs.

== Legend ==
Bayard first appears as the property of Renaud de Montauban (Italian: Rinaldo) in the Old French twelfth century chanson de geste The Four Sons of Aymon. The horse was capable of carrying Rinaldo and his three brothers ("the four sons of Aymon") all at the same time and of understanding human speech. Near the end of the work, Renaud is forced to cede Bayard to Charlemagne who, as punishment for the horse's exploits, has a large stone tied to Bayard's neck and has the horse pushed into the river; Bayard however smashes the stone with his hooves and escapes to live forever more in the woods.

In subsequent chansons de geste, Bayard was said to have been initially won by Renaud's cousin, the magician Maugris, before being given to Renaud.

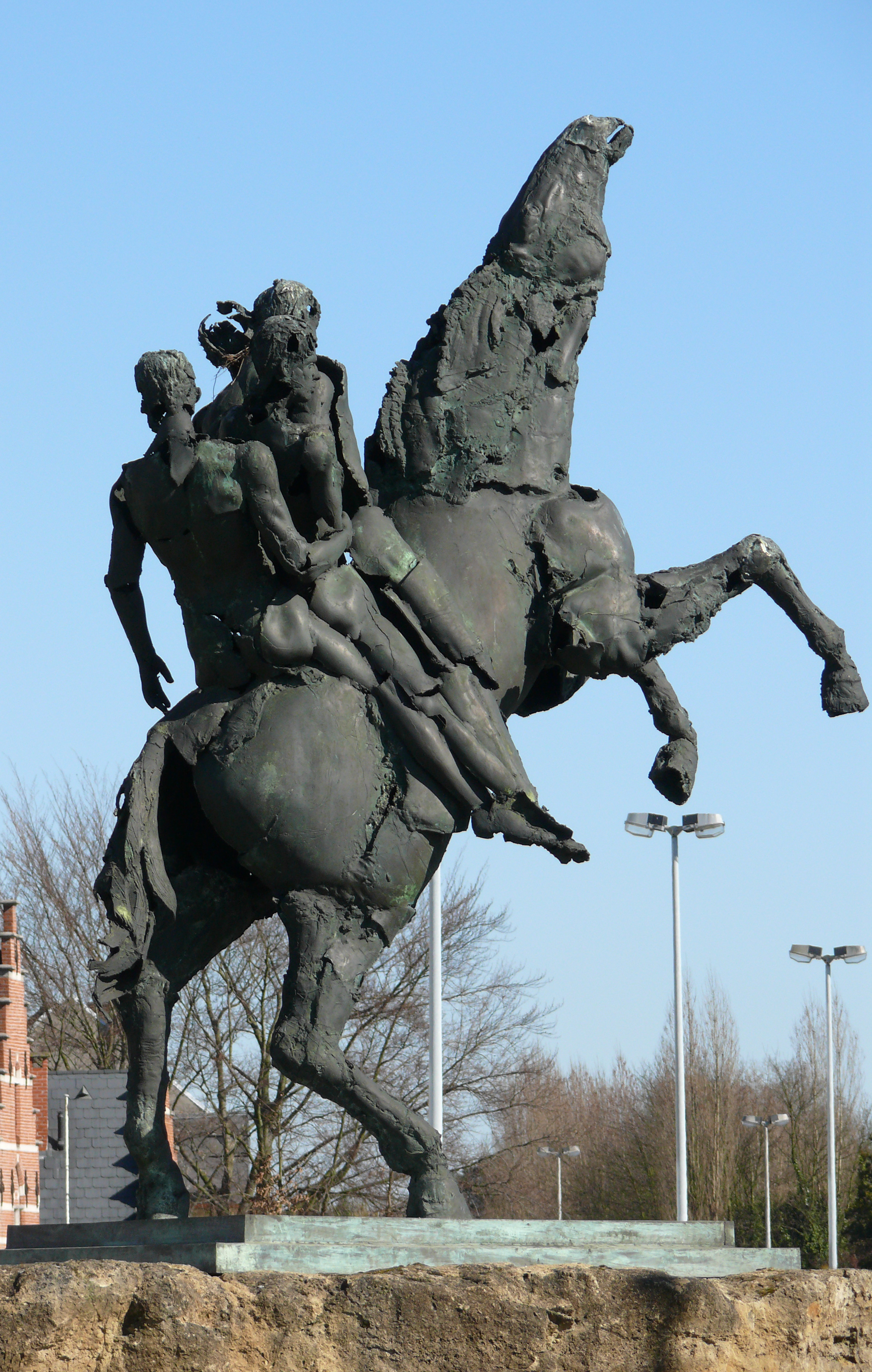
Sculpture of Bayard in Dendermonde, Belgium

In Bulfinch's Mythology, Rinaldo's acquisition of Bayard is described as follows: a disguised Maugris (who had previously acquired Bayard) tells Rinaldo that a wild horse under an enchantment roams the woods, and that this horse belonged initially to Amadis of Gaul and can only be won by a knight of Amadis' lineage. Rinaldo eventually subdues the horse by throwing it on the ground, breaking the enchantment. This episode where Rinaldo cooperates with another knight called Isolier, as well as providing the provenance of Bayard as formerly belonging to Amadis is actually attested in Torquato Tasso's Rinaldo (<1562)

Bayard also appears in the epic poems on chivalrous subjects by Luigi Pulci, Matteo Maria Boiardo and Ludovico Ariosto.

Bayard, by the late 13th century, also acquired common usage as a name for any bay-coloured horse (reddish-brown coat with black mane and tail) and lost some of his lustre as a magic heroic horse. The name "Bayard" became associated in English literature with a clownish, blind and foolish horse.

Chaucer first used "Bayard" in a simile in the epic poem Troilus and Criseyde. As Troilus had been scorning the power of love before seeing Criseyde and falling in love himself, so Bayard, proudly skipping "out of the wey" while he pranced, had to admit, "Yet am I but an hors". Chaucer also used "Bayard" in The Canterbury Tales (c. 1387) to denote a randy stud in "The Reeve's Tale" and a blind, foolish horse in "The Canon's Yeoman's Tale": "Though ye prolle ay, ye shul it nevere fynde. Ye been as boold as is Bayard the blynde. That blondreth forth and peril casteth noon." ("Though you search afar, you shall never find it; Be you as bold as Bayard the blind, that blunders forth and perceives no peril.")

== Local ==
Outside the Walloon town of Dinant in Belgium stands "Bayard Rock", a large cleft rock formation that was said to have been split by Bayard's mighty hooves. In Namur, the next town downriver along the Meuse, stands a locally famous statue of Bayard and the Four Aymon Brothers. There are plenty of named places in Wallonia linked to the legend of the Four Aymon Brothers and Bayard.

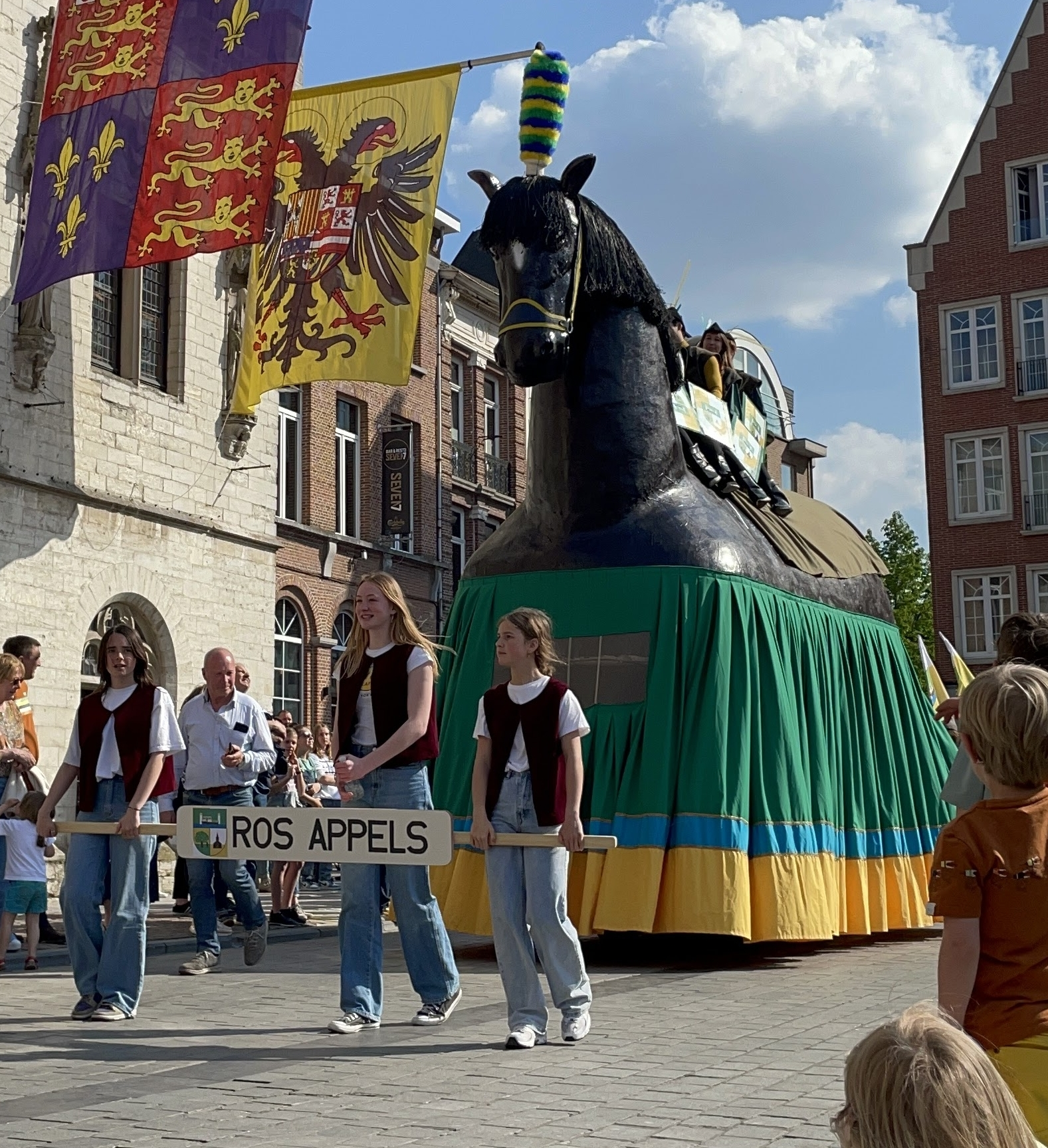
The Appels Steed Bayard (Peird van Appels)

The Bayard legend is also celebrated in other towns in Belgium — most notably in the Flemish city of Dendermonde, where a large ommegang is organized every ten years. In several parts of Dendermonde, located outside the city walls, namely Appels, Donckstraat, Keur and Sint-Gillis, smaller editions of this ommegang are organized on an annual basis.

The rivalry between Dendermonde and Aalst, a city close by, has led to the construction of the Steed Balatum by the inhabitants of Aalst, as a parody on Bayard.

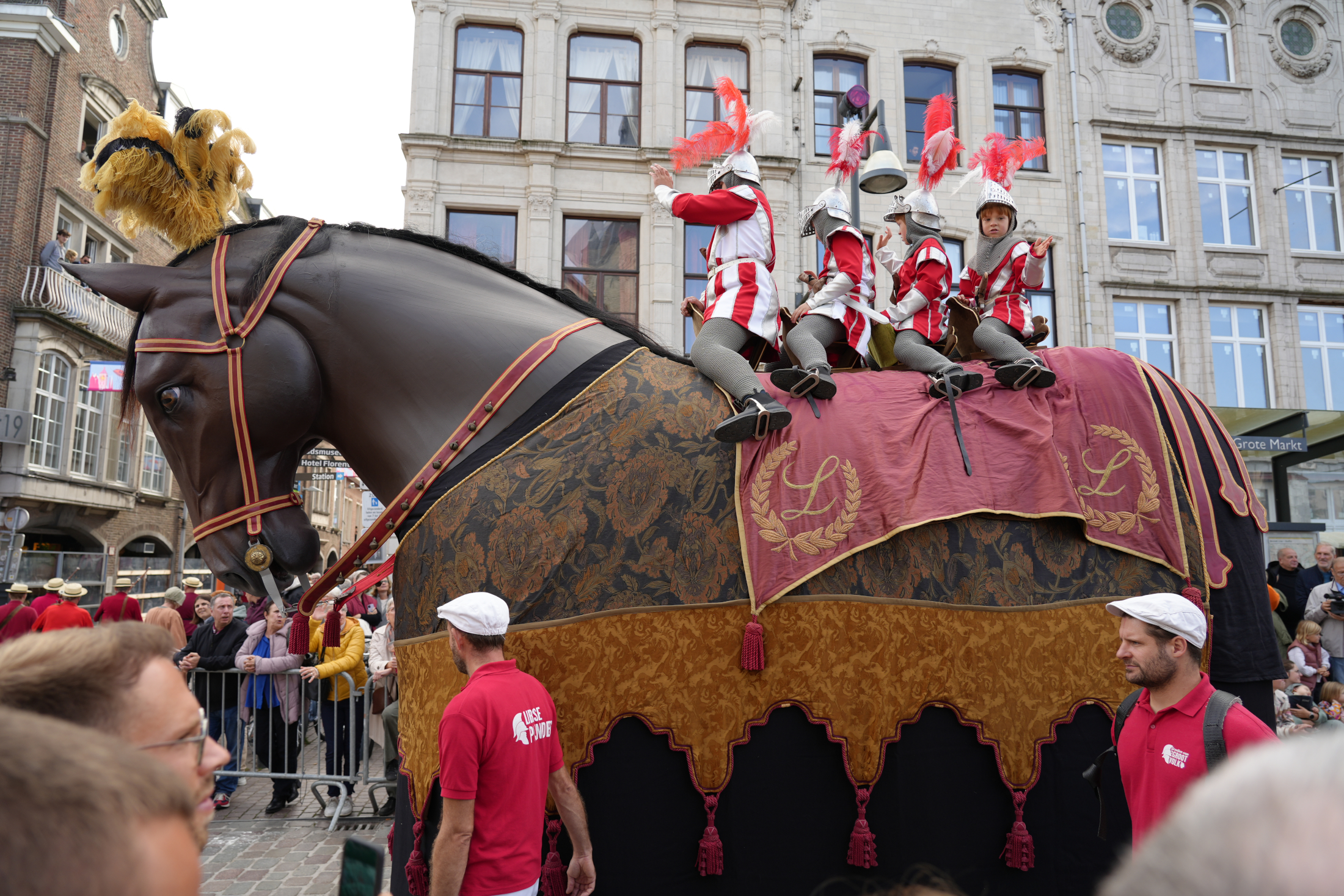
Bayard in Lier

Brussels (as part of the Ommegang), Lier, Mechelen and Ath all organize processions that include Bayard.

There are also Bayard statues in Ghent, Geldrop, Namur and Grembergen.

A similar magical horse named "Blind Byard" is part of Lincolnshire folklore at Byard's Leap.

In the Catalan town of Riudoms the Cavall dels Nebot is carried through the streets every year.

== See also ==
- List of fictional horses
- Veillantif – Roland/Orlando's horse (also called Brigliadoro)
- Marshal Ney – often used as a nickname
- Ros Beiaard – Flemish folkloristic procession in Dendermonde
