= Malagigi =

Malagigi can refer to:

- Maugris, hero of chansons de geste as named in Italian Renaissance epics
- Marc'Antonio Pasqualini (1614-1691), Italian castrato singer nicknamed Malagigi
