= HMS Rinaldo =

Four ships of the Royal Navy have borne the name HMS Rinaldo, derived from the mythical knight Renaud de Montauban:

- HMS Rinaldo (1808) was a 10-gun Cherokee-class brig-sloop launched in 1808. She was converted to a packet brig in 1824 and was sold in 1835.
- HMS Rinaldo (1860) was a Camelion-class wooden screw sloop launched in 1860 and sold in 1884.
- HMS Rinaldo (1900) was a Condor-class sloop launched in 1900 and sold in 1921.
- HMS Rinaldo (J225) was an Algerine-class minesweeper launched in 1943 and broken up in 1961.
