= Saracen =

Archaic term for Arabs and later for all Muslims

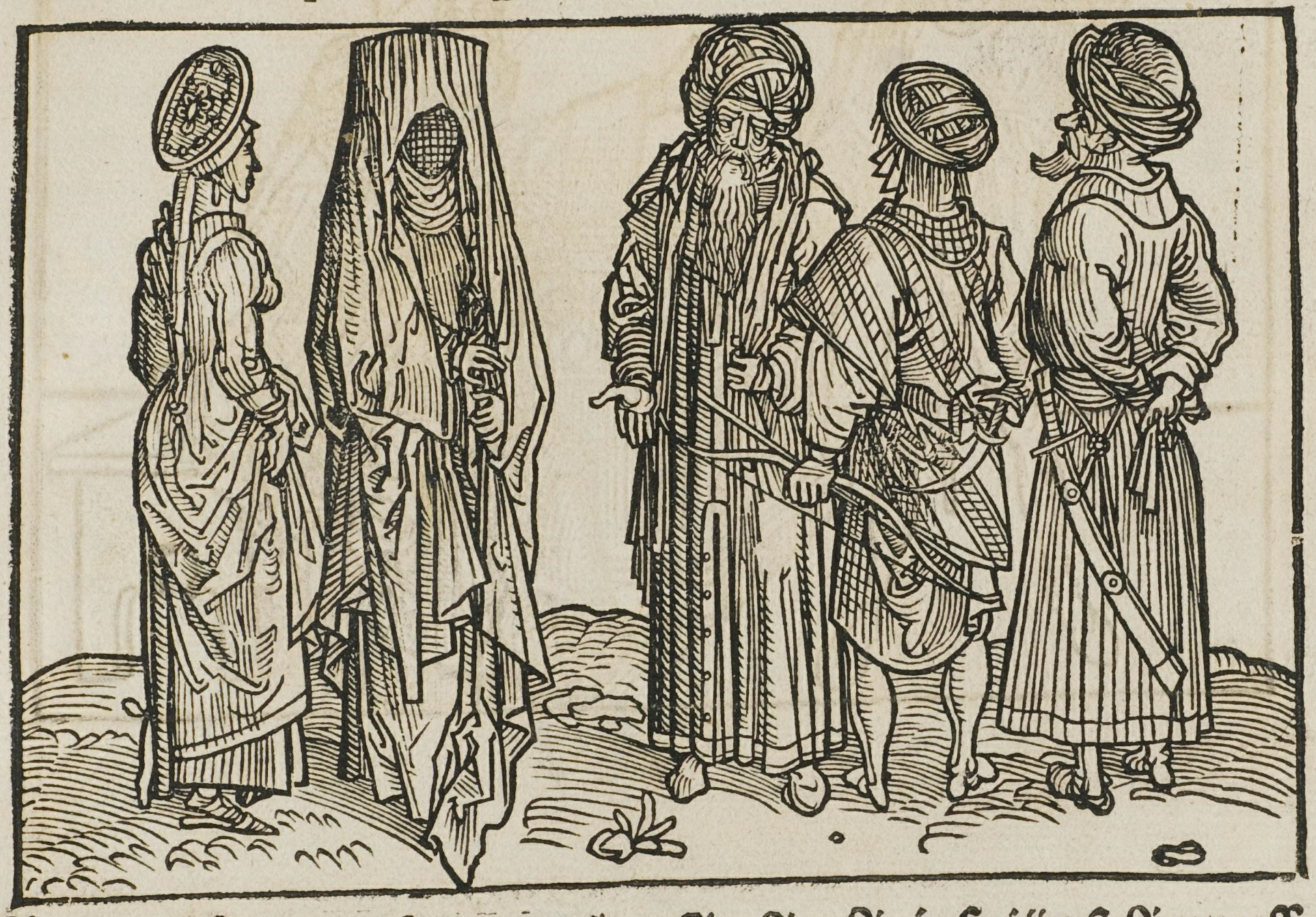
Depiction of Saracens (Muslims) by Dutch artist Erhard Reuwich, 1486

The term "Saracen" (/ˈsærəsən/ SARR-ə-sən) was commonly used in medieval Europe to refer to a person who lived in or near what the ancient Romans knew as Arabia Petraea and Arabia Deserta. Its original meaning in Greek and Latin is not known with certainty. By the early medieval period, it had come to be associated with the Arabian tribes. Following the rise of Islam, which occurred in Arabia, the word's definition evolved to refer not only to Arabs, but to Muslims taken generally as well. It eventually became the standard adjective among European Christians for all people and things from the Muslim world, regardless of whether they were Arab in origin.

The oldest known source mentioning "Saracens" in association with Muslims is the Greek-language Christian tract Doctrina Jacobi, which was compiled in the Byzantine Empire amidst the Muslim conquest of the Levant. The word became particularly widespread in European societies during the Crusades, when it was used by the Catholic Church and by several European Christian political and military figures.

By the 12th century, "Saracen" had developed various overlapping definitions that generally conflated peoples and cultures in the Abbasid Caliphate, comprising all those in the Near East and beyond. Such an expansion in its meaning had begun centuries earlier, as evidenced in a number of 8th-century Byzantine documents in which Muslims are called Saracens. Before the 16th century, "Muslim" and "Islam" were generally not used in European discourse, with a few isolated exceptions; "Saracen" was gradually rendered obsolete amidst the Age of Discovery, whereafter "Mohammedan" became commonplace, though it also fell out of use by the 20th century and is now considered a misnomer or impertinent by many Muslims because it may suggest that they worship Muhammad rather than God.

== Early usage and origins ==
The Latin term Saraceni is of unknown original meaning. There are claims of it being derived from the Semitic triliteral root šrq "east" and šrkt "tribe, confederation". Another possible Semitic root is srq "to steal, rob, thief", more specifically from the noun sāriq (Arabic: سارق), pl. sāriqīn (سارقين), which means "thief, marauder". In his Levantine Diary, covering the years 1699–1740, the Damascene writer Hamad bin Kanan al-Salhi (ar) (Arabic: محمد بن كَنّان الصالحي) used the term sarkan to mean "travel on a military mission" from the Near East to parts of Southern Europe which were under Ottoman Empire rule, particularly Cyprus and Rhodes.

Alternatively, this term may be etymologically linked to the Persian root Sarebān or Sarevān (ساربان یا ساروان), referring to those who lead or drive camel caravans.

Ptolemy's 2nd-century work, Geography, describes Sarakēnḗ (Ancient Greek: Σαρακηνή) as a region in the northern Sinai Peninsula. Ptolemy also mentions a people called the Sarakēnoí (Ancient Greek: οἱ Σαρακηνοί) living in the northwestern Arabian Peninsula (near neighbor to the Sinai). Eusebius in his Ecclesiastical history narrates an account wherein Pope Dionysius of Alexandria mentions Saracens in a letter while describing the persecution of Christians by the Roman Emperor Decius: "Many were, in the Arabian mountain, enslaved by the barbarous 'sarkenoi'." The Augustan History also refers to an attack by Saraceni on Pescennius Niger's army in Egypt in 193, but provides little information as to identifying them.

Both Hippolytus of Rome and Uranius mention three distinct peoples in Arabia during the first half of the third century: the Taeni, the Saraceni, and the Arabes. The Taeni, later identified with the Arab people called Tayy, were located around Khaybar (an oasis north of Medina) and also in an area stretching up to the Euphrates. The Saraceni were placed north of them. These Saracens, located in the northern Hejaz, were described as people with a certain military ability who were opponents of the Roman Empire and who were classified by the Romans as barbarians.

The Saracens are described as forming the equites from Phoenicia and Thamud. In one document, the defeated enemies of Diocletian's campaign in the Syrian Desert are described as Saracens. Other 4th-century military reports make no mention of Arabs, but refer to Saracen groups ranging as far east as Mesopotamia who were involved in battles on both the Sasanian and Roman sides. The Saracens were named in the Roman administrative document Notitia Dignitatum, dating from the time of Theodosius I in the 4th century, as comprising distinctive units in the Roman army. They were distinguished in the document from Arabs.

The fifth century historian Sozomen gives an etymology for the word "Saracen", saying that it comes from the Ishmaelites, a group of Arabs who had practices which they had gained from the Jews, such as circumcision and a taboo around pork, as being supposedly descended from Hagar was embarrassing, as she was a slave, they assumed the name "Saracen" after Sarah, the wife of Abraham.

== Medieval usage of the term ==
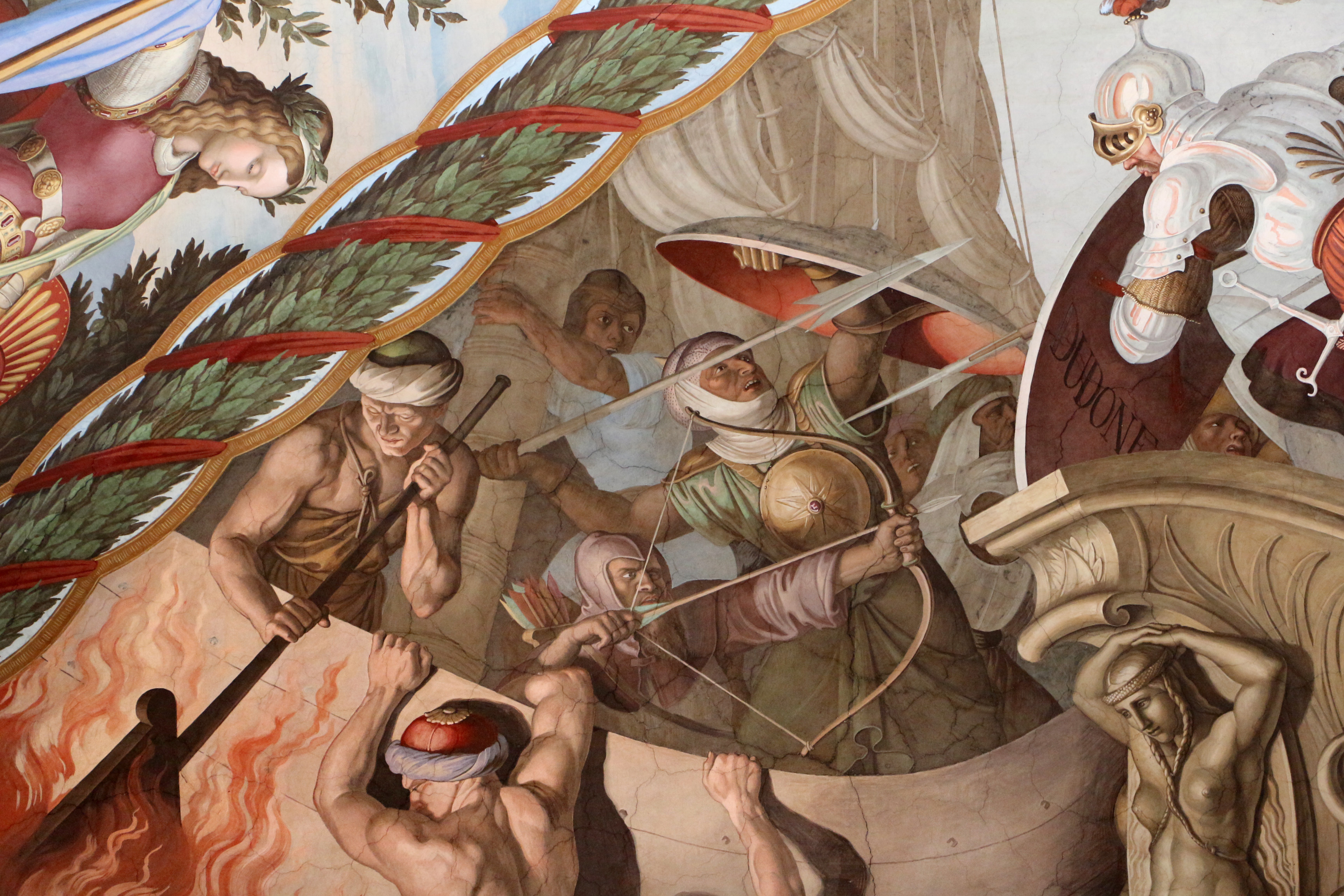
Use of saracene in Catholic narrative: Ceiling of church painting with the name "Attacco delle navi saracene", by Julius Schnorr von Carolsfeld, 1822–27.

No later than the early fifth century, Jewish and Christian writers began to equate Saracens with Arabs. Saracens were associated with Ishmaelites (descendants of Abraham's firstborn Ishmael) in some strands of Jewish, Christian, and Islamic genealogical thinking. The writings of Jerome (d. 420) are the earliest known version of the claim that Ishmaelites chose to be called Saracens in order to identify with Abraham's "free" wife Sarah, rather than as Hagarenes, which would have highlighted their association with Abraham's "slave woman" Hagar. This claim was popular during the Middle Ages, but derives more from Paul's allegory in the New Testament letter to the Galatians than from historical data. The name Saracen was not indigenous among the populations so described but was applied to them by Greco-Roman historians based on Greek place names.

As the Middle Ages progressed, usage of the term in the Latin West changed, but its connotation remained associated with opponents of Christianity, and its exact definition is unclear. In an 8th-century polemical work, the Arab monk John of Damascus criticized the Saracens as followers of a "false" prophet and "forerunner[s] to the Antichrist," and further connected their name to Ishmael and his expulsion.

By the 12th century, Medieval Europeans used the term Saracen as both an ethnic and religious marker. In some Medieval literature, Saracens were equated with Muslims in general and described as dark-skinned, while Christians lighter-skinned. An example is in The King of Tars, a medieval romance. The Song of Roland, an Old French 11th-century heroic poem, refers to the black skin of Saracens as their only exotic feature.

The term Saracen remained in use in the West as a synonym for "Muslim" until the 18th century. When the Age of Discovery commenced, it gradually lost popularity to the newer term Mohammedan, which came into usage from at least the 16th century. After this point, Saracen enjoyed only sporadic usage (for example, in the phrase "Indo-Saracenic architecture") before being outmoded entirely.

In the Wiltshire dialect, the meaning of "Sarsen" (Saracen) was eventually extended to refer to anything regarded as non-Christian, whether Muslim or pagan. From that derived the still current term "sarsen" (a shortening of "Saracen stone"), denoting the kind of stone used by the builders of Stonehenge, long predating Islam.

=== Use in medieval entertainment: Crusade cycle ===
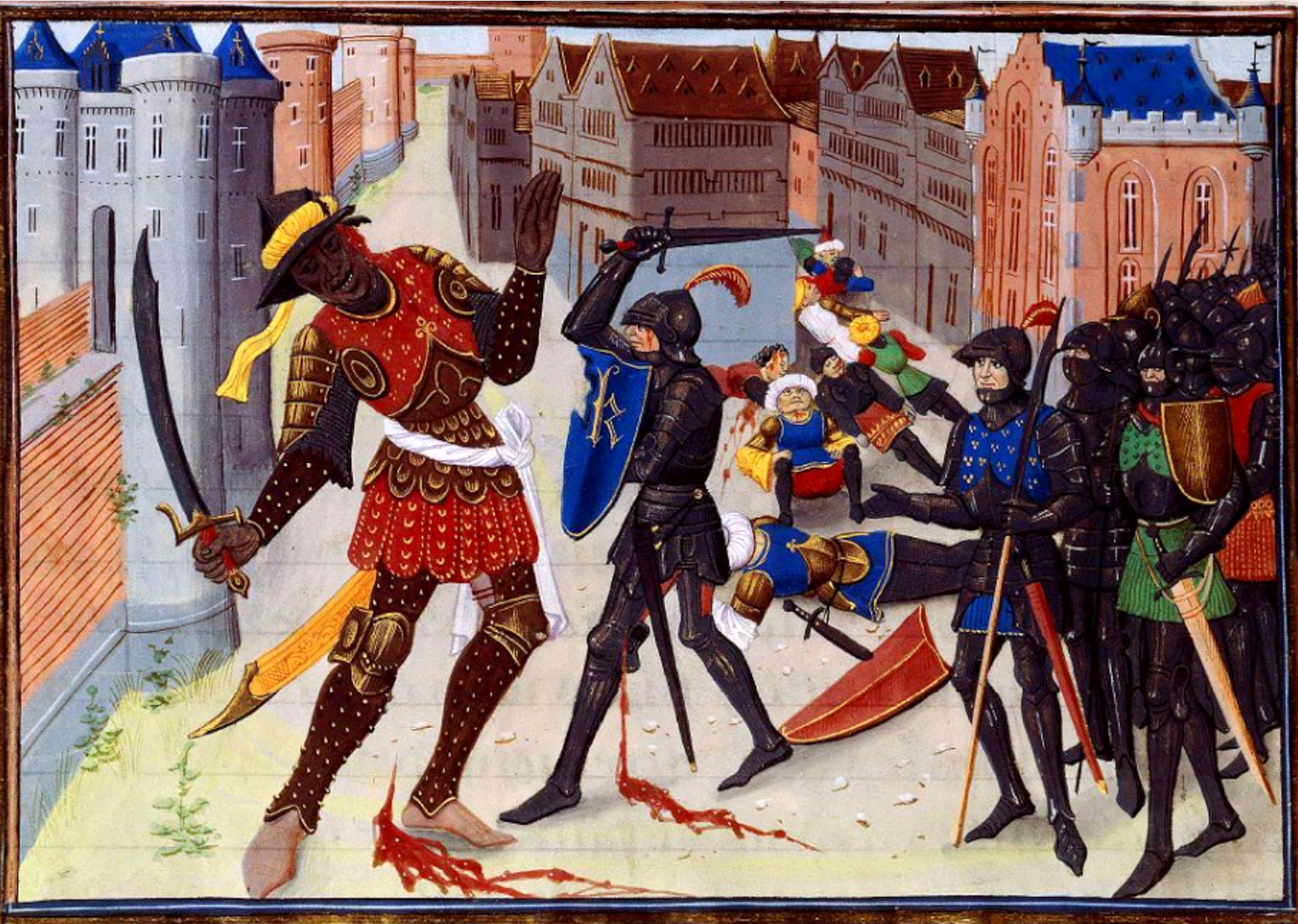
Maugis fighting the Saracen Noiron in Aigremont, in Renaud de Montauban. David Aubert, Bruges, 1462–1470.

The rhyming stories of the Old French Crusade cycle were popular with medieval audiences in Northern France, Occitania and Iberia. Beginning in the late 12th century, stories about the sieges of Antioch and Jerusalem gave accounts of battle scenes and suffering, and of Saracen plunder, their silks and gold, and masterfully embroidered and woven tents. From the story of the Frankish knights at the tent of Saracen leader Corbaran:

The tent was very rich, draped with brilliant silk,
and patterned green silk was thrown over the grass,
with lengths of cut fabric worked with birds and beasts.
The cords with which it was tied are of silk,
and the quilt was sewn with a shining, delicate samit.

== See also ==
- Hagarenes
- Ishmaelites
- Magarites
- Muhajirun
- Tayy
- Arab–Byzantine wars
- Early Muslim conquests
- Serkland
- Böszörmény
- Moors

== Bibliography ==
- Kirby, Peter. "External references to Islam". christianorigins.con. Archived from the original on 29 April 2006.
- Déroche, Vincent; Dagron, Gilbert (1991). Doctrina Jacobi nuper Baptizati, "Juifs et chrétiens dans l'Orient du VIIe siècle" (Greek text with French translation ed.). pp. 17–248.
- Daniel, Norman (1979). The Arabs and Mediaeval Europe. Longman. p. 385. ISBN 0-582-78088-8. JSTOR 43628523.
- Heng, Geraldine (2012). Empire of Magic: Medieval Romance and the Politics of Cultural Fantasy. Columbia University Press. p. 536. ISBN 978-0-231-12527-7. JSTOR 10.7312/heng12526.
- Kahf, Mohja (1999). Western Representations of the Muslim Women: From Termagant to Odalisque. University of Texas Press. p. 207. ISBN 978-0-292-74337-3.
- Macdonald, Michael C. A. (2009). "On Saracens, the Rawwāfah Inscription and the Roman Army". Literacy and Identity in Pre-Islamic Arabia. Variorum Collected Studies Series. Ashgate Variorum. ISBN 978-0-754-65965-5.
- Retsö, Jan (4 July 2003). The Arabs in Antiquity: Their History from the Assyrians to the Umayyads. Routledge. p. 704. ISBN 978-0-7007-1679-1.
- Timani, Hussam, Saracens, in Muhammad in History, Thought, and Culture: An Encyclopedia of the Prophet of God (2 vols.), Edited by C. Fitzpatrick and A. Walker, Santa Barbara, ABC-CLIO, 2014, Vol. II, pp. 538–542. ISBN 1610691776
- Tolan, John; Veinstein, Gilles and Henry Laurens. 2013. Europe and the Islamic World: A History. Princeton University Press. ISBN 978-0-691-14705-5.
- Tolan, John Victor. 2002. Saracens: Islam in the Medieval European Imagination. Columbia University Press. ISBN 978-0-231-12333-4
