= Frans Baert =

Belgian-Flemish lawyer and politician (1925–2022)

Frans Baert (25 November 1925 – 15 July 2022) was a Belgian-Flemish lawyer and politician. He was a member of the Volksunie party, before joining the Sociaal-Liberale Partij.

== Life and career ==
Baert was born in Grembergen on 25 November 1925. He died on 15 July 2022, at the age of 96.

== Frans Baert's doctrine ==
Baert was the founder of a methodology, known in Dutch as Baertdoctrine; regarding Flemish independence. This doctrine, taken by some Flemish politicians, is a step-by-step strategy in order to get an independent Flemish State through democratic reforms of Belgium.

Each reform must follow three basic rules in order to reach a Flemish independence at the end:

1. Each reform must be a significant step towards greater autonomy.
2. Each reform should not prevent further reforms.
3. Inside each reform, the price paid to the other negotiator should not be unreasonable.
