= Renaud de Montauban =

Legendary hero and knight

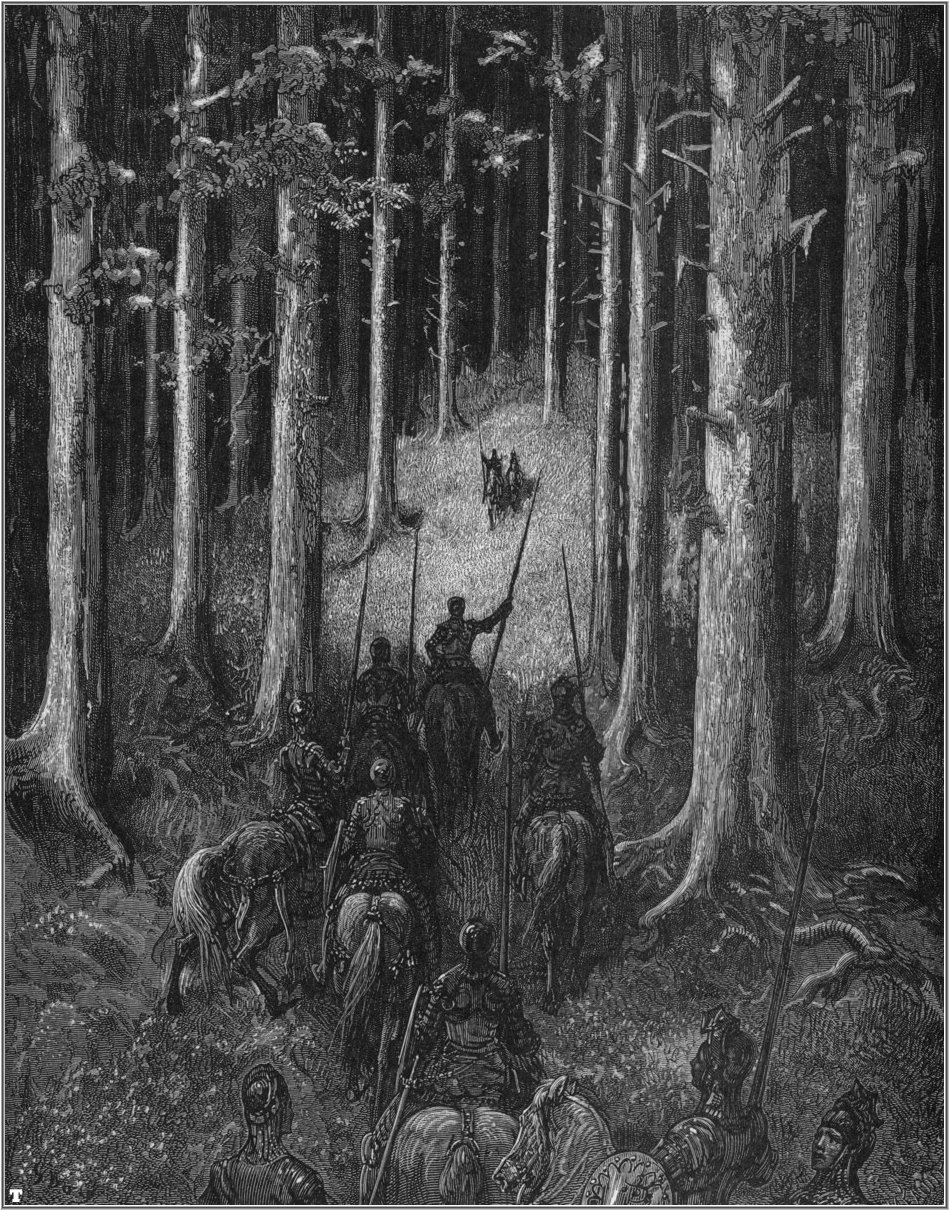
Illustration by Gustav Dore to Orlando Furioso: Rinaldo and his men see a knight and lady approach

Renaud (or Renaut or Renault) de Montauban (Modern French: [ʁəno d(ə) mɔ̃tobɑ̃]; German: Reinhold von Montalban; Italian: Rinaldo di Montalbano; Dutch: Reinout van Montalban or Montalbaen) was a legendary hero and knight who appeared in a 12th-century Old French chanson de geste known as The Four Sons of Aymon. The four sons of Duke Aymon are Renaud, Richard, Alard and Guiscard, and their cousin is the magician Maugris (French: Maugis; Italian: Malagi or Malagigi). Renaud possesses the magical horse Bayard and the sword Froberge (French: Flamberge; Italian: Fusberta or Frusberta).

The story of Renaud was popular across Europe. The tale was adapted into Dutch, German, Italian and English versions throughout the Middle Ages, inspired the Old Icelandic Mágus saga jarls, and also incited subsequent sequels and related texts that form part of the Doon de Mayence cycle of chansons. Renaud, as Rinaldo, is an important character in Italian Renaissance epics, including Morgante by Luigi Pulci, Orlando Innamorato by Matteo Maria Boiardo and Orlando Furioso by Ludovico Ariosto.

== Quatre Fils Aymon ==
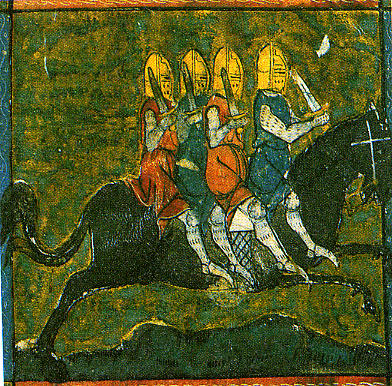
The horse Bayard carrying the four sons of Aymon, miniature in a manuscript from the 14th century.

The oldest extant version of the anonymous Old French chanson de geste Quatre Fils Aymon dates from the late 12th century and comprises 18,489 Alexandrin (12 syllable) verses grouped in assonanced and rhymed laisses (the first 12,120 verses use assonance; critics suggest that the rhymed laisses derive from a different poet). It is one of the longest of all the chansons de geste. Other versions range from 14,300 to 28,000 verses. It was transformed into prose romances in the 14th and 15th centuries, and, judging from the number of editions, the prose Quatre Fils Aymon was the most popular romance of chivalry in the late 15th and first half of the 16th century in France. The tale was the basis of other medieval versions in Italian, German, Dutch and English.

The plot of the French chanson is as follows: Renaud and his three brothers were sons of Aymon de Dordone. They flee from the court of Charlemagne after Renaud kills one of Charlemagne's nephews (Bertolai) in a brawl. A long war follows, during which Renaud and his brothers remain faithful to the chivalrous code of honor despite their sufferings, until Charlemagne is prevailed on by his paladins to make terms.

The four brothers are pardoned on condition that Renaud go to the Holy Land on Crusade, and that their magical horse Bayard, who could expand his size to carry all four brothers on its back, be surrendered to Charlemagne. Charlemagne orders that the magic horse be drowned by chaining it to a stone and throwing it in a river, but the horse escapes and lives forever more in the woods. Renaud, after further adventures on the Crusades, returns home.

He eventually abandons his home and goes to Cologne, where he becomes a builder on a shrine to Saint Peter. In the end, he is murdered by resentful workers, but his body is miraculously saved from the river and makes its way magically in a cart back to his brothers.

Bulfinch relates that the cart magically moved to Dortmund, where Renaud is made patron saint of a new church, identifying him with Saint Reinold.

Charlemagne is portrayed as vengeful and treacherous in these stories, and he is fooled by the sorcerer Maugris; the sympathy of the storyteller is clearly with the four brothers, but ultimately feudal authority is upheld.

== Renaud de Montauban cycle ==
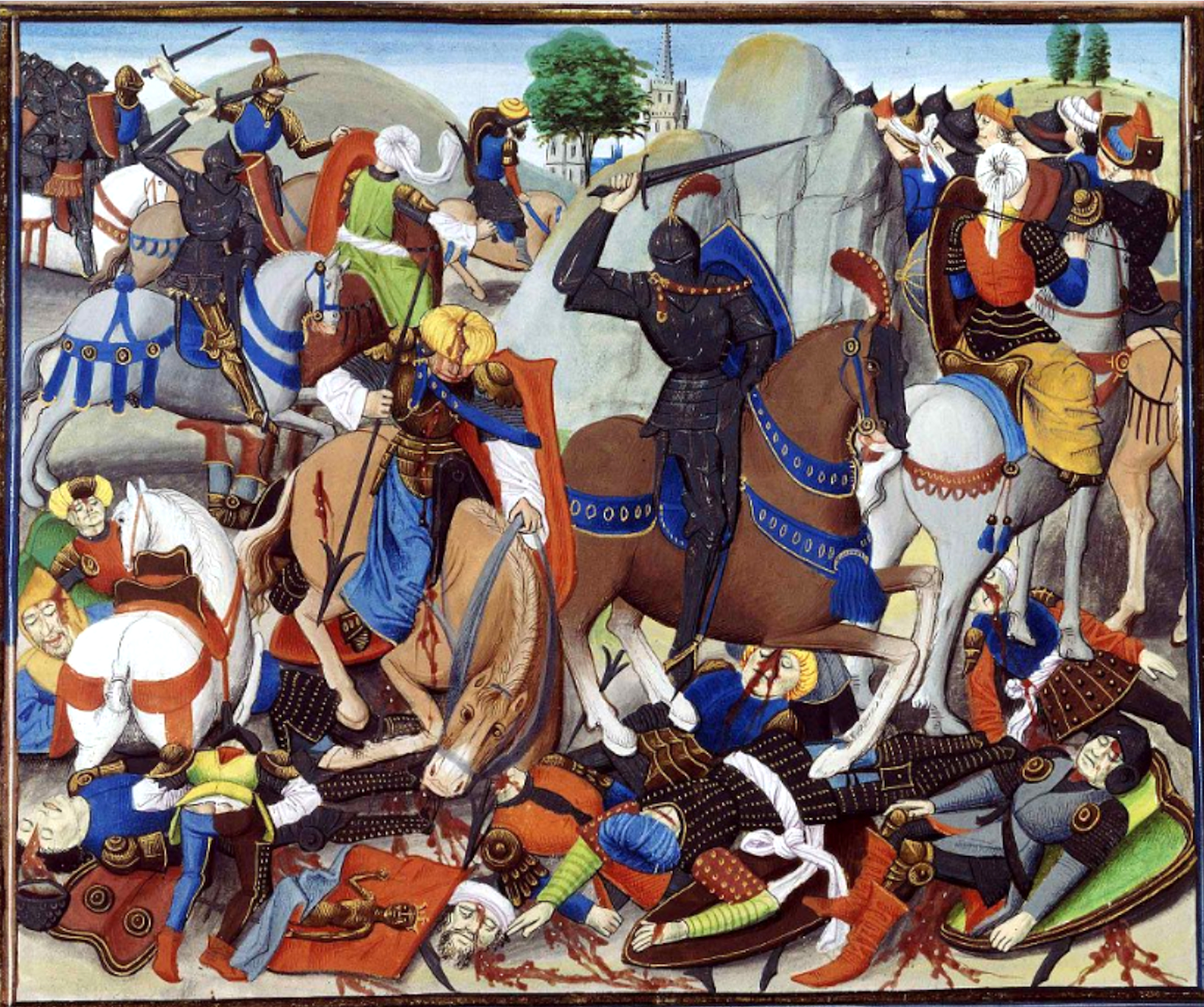
Maugis on his horse Bayard, fighting against the Infidels, in Renaud de Montauban. Loyset Liédet, Bruges, 1462-1470

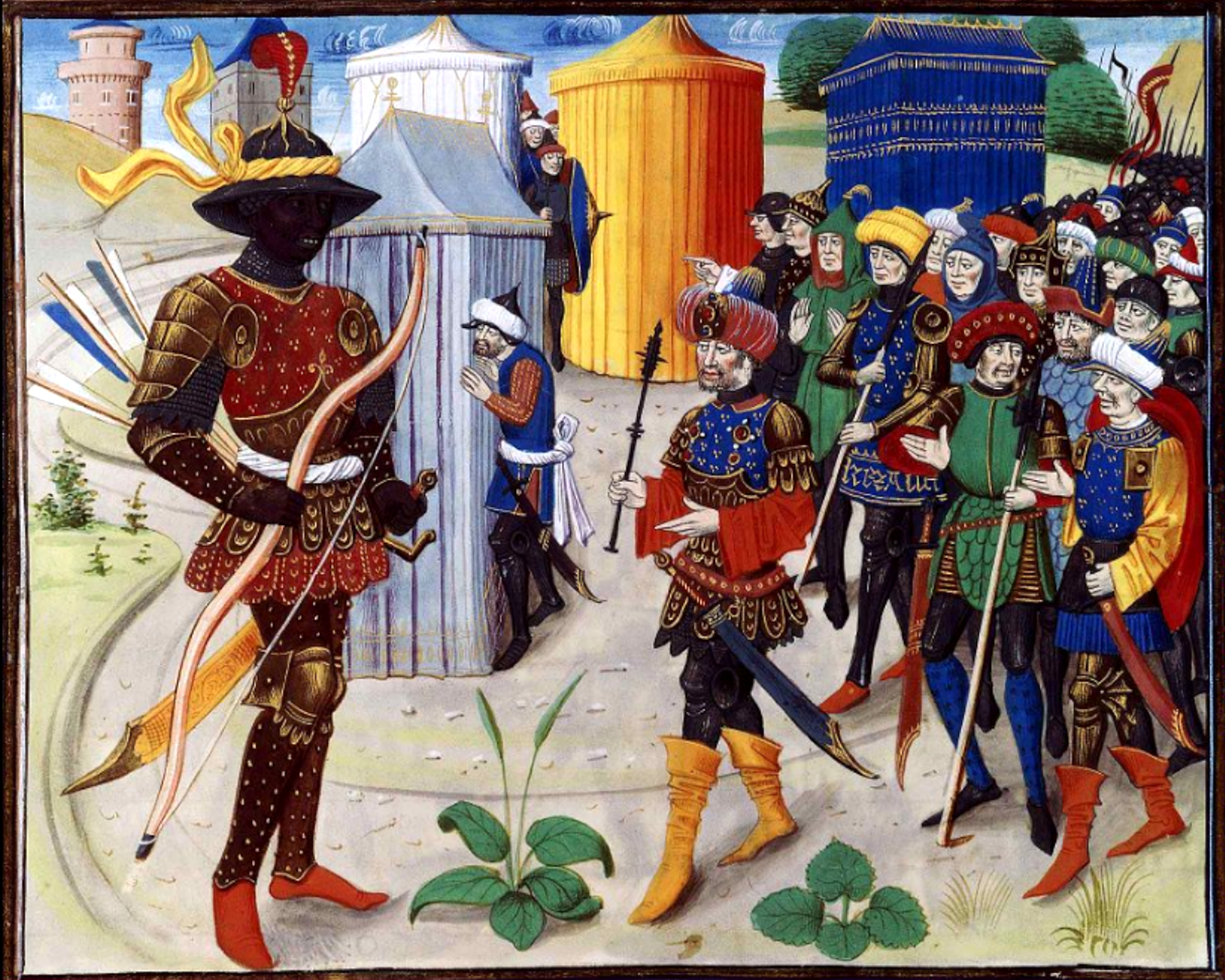
Vivien, as a Saracen emir, sends the black wizard Noiron to fight Maugis in the siege of Aigremont. Renaud de Montauban. Loyset Liédet, Bruges, 1462-1470

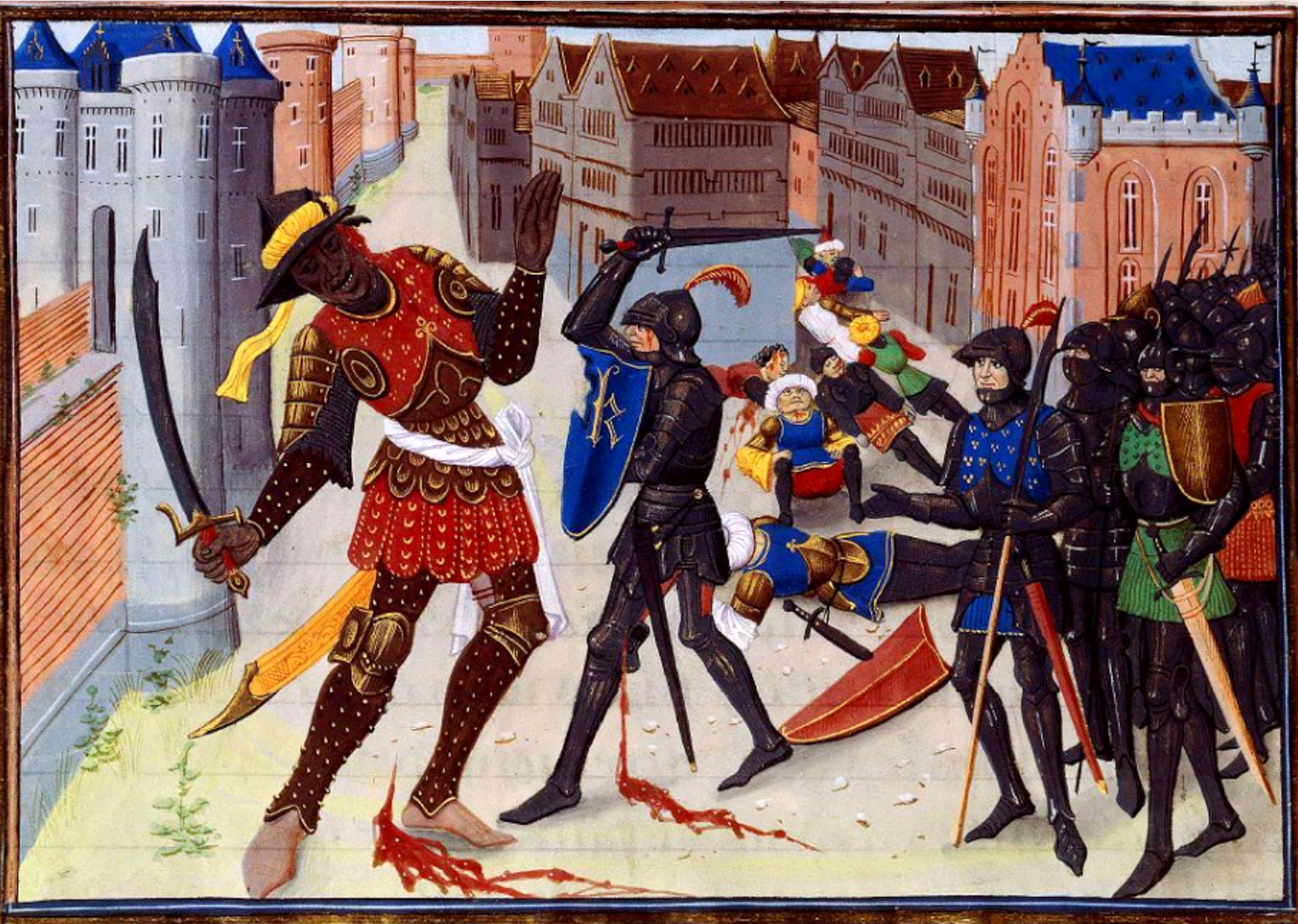
Maugis fighting the Saracen wizard Noiron in Aigremont, in Renaud de Montaubant. David Aubert, Bruges, 1462-1470

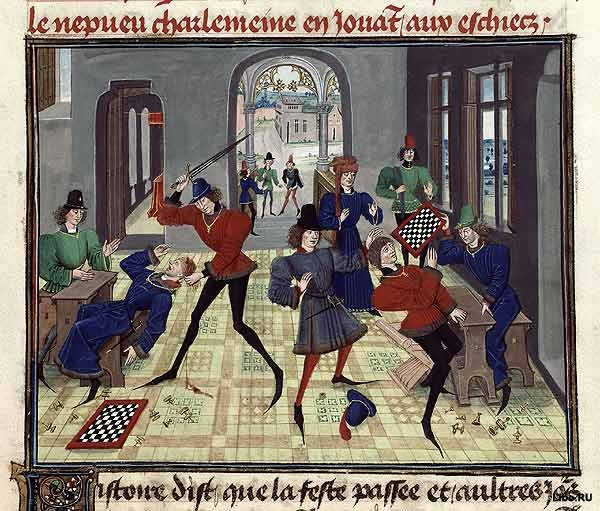
15th Century History of Renaud de Montauban, 1468-1470

From the 13th century on, other texts concerning separate elements of the extended Renaud de Montauban story were created; together with the original Quatre Fils Aymon, these are termed the "Renaud de Montauban cycle". These poems are: Maugis d'Aigremont (story of the youth of Maugis), Mort de Maugis (story of the death of Maugis), Vivien de Monbranc (story of the brother of Maugis), Bueve d'Aigremont (story of the father of Maugis, Bueve d'Aigremont, brother to Girart de Roussillon and Doon de Nanteuil).

=== Maugis d'Aigremont ===
Maugis d'Aigremont was a chanson de geste most likely composed in the early 13th century. It exists in a few extant versions; the latest version comprises 9,078 rhymed alexandrines. It tells of the youth of Maugris.

The story is, briefly, as follows: the twin sons of Beuve d'Aigremont are Maugis and Vivien. Taken away at birth, Maugis is raised by the fairy Oriande while Vivien is raised by Esclarmonde (wife of the Saracen Sorgalant, ruler of Monbranc). Maugis conquers the horse Bayard and gains the sword Froberge, participates in various battles, and kills Sorgolant. Discovering his identity, he battles to save his maternal grandfather (who is being attacked by Charlemagne) and his father (who is being assaulted by Vivien, who becomes the new ruler, or "amachour", of Monbranc). Vivien then discovers his identity and converts to Christianity. At the end, Maugis gives Bayard and Froberge to his cousin Renaud.

=== Mort de Maugis ===
Mort de Maugis is a short work of 1,250 verses. It tells a different version of the death of Maugis than the one given in Quatre fils Aymon (in which he ends his days in a hermitage): Maugis becomes a senator at Rome.

=== Vivien de Monbranc ===
Vivien de Monbranc (or Vivien l'amachour de Monbranc) has come down to us in only one version, a short work of 1,100 alexandrine verses composed in the 13th century. It constitutes a continuation of Maugis d'Aigremont, and is most likely a shortened version of what was originally a longer work. It tells of how Vivien, after his conversion, was attacked by unbelievers and was aided by Maugis and his valet Fousifie.

=== Bueve d'Aigremont ===
This work from the third quarter of the 12th century, appears as a form of "preface" in a great number of manuscripts of Quatre fils Aymon. It tells of the story of the father of Maugris, Bueve d'Aigremont who becomes a rebellious vassal of Charlemagne. Bueve is aided by his brothers Girart de Roussillon and Doon de Nanteuil, but he dies.

== Rinaldo in Orlando Furioso ==
In Ariosto's Orlando Furioso, Rinaldo is the brother of Bradamante. Rinaldo and his cousin Orlando (Roland) both fall in love with the beautiful Angelica and a rivalry arises between them. Rinaldo drinks from a fountain which causes him to fall in love with Angelica while she drinks from another fountain which causes her to hate him (Orlando Furioso I: 78); this exactly reverses the situation in Boiardo's Orlando Innamorato. He is sent by Charlemagne to Britain where he recruits knights from Scotland and England to aid in the defense of France. He is finally cured of his love for Angelica when he drinks from another magic fountain (Orlando Furioso XLII: 63). He promises his sister Bradamante to the African knight Ruggiero.

== Rinaldo of Jerusalem Delivered ==
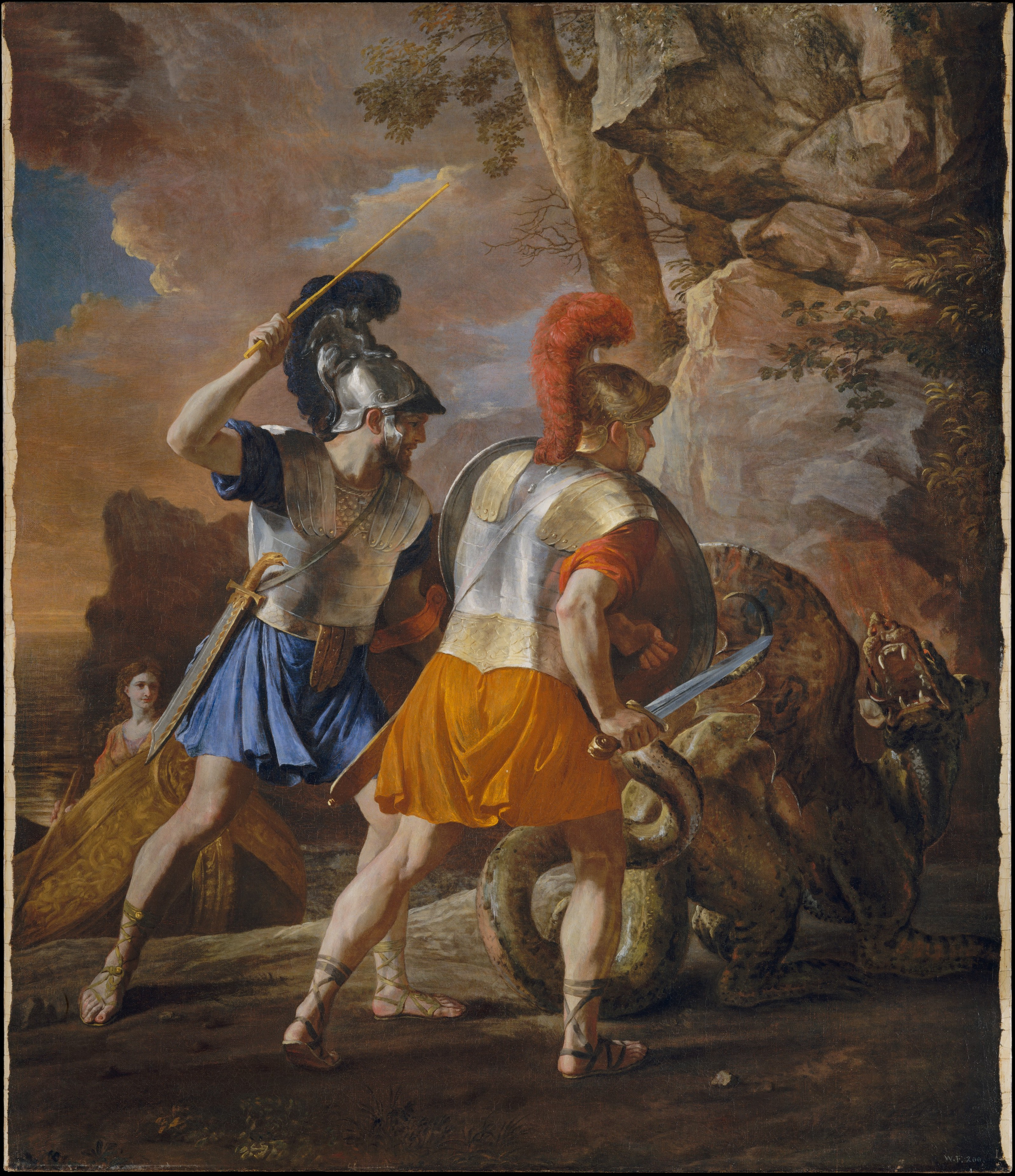
The picture illustrates an episode from Tasso's heroic crusader poem "Jerusalem Delivered" (1580), in which the Christian knights Carlo and Ubaldo confront a dragon in their attempt to rescue Rinaldo from a pagan sorceress

Renaud de Montauban should not be confused with Rinaldo, the son of Bertoldo and reputed founder of the House of Este in Torquato Tasso's epic poem Jerusalem Delivered (1580), though this second character is made out to be a descendant of the original paladin's sister Bradamante. The second Rinaldo is the son of Bertoldo and Sophia and he lived during the time of the First Crusade. According to legend, Bertoldo is the son of Azzo II, a real person who was Count of Este (Orlando Furioso III: 29-30). One of Azzo II's sons was Welf IV, (Welf I, Duke of Bavaria). Jerusalem Delivered states that Bertoldo is related to Welf IV. (Jerusalem Delivered XVII: 81).

In Jerusalem Delivered Rinaldo is the greatest of the Christian knights. Apart from various battles in the story, the witch Armida comes across him sleeping, and abducts him in her chariot (Canto 14). She intends to kill him but she falls in love with him instead and takes him away to a magical island where he becomes infatuated with her and forgets the crusade. Carlo and Ubaldo, two Christian knights and close companions of Rinaldo, seek out the hidden fortress, brave the dangers that guard it and find Rinaldo and Armida in each other's arms. By giving Rinaldo a mirror of diamond, they force him to see himself in his effeminate and amorous state and to return to the war, leaving Armida heartbroken (Cantos 14-16).

Rinaldo is deposited on a shore where he finds a shield and sword, and the "Mago d'Ascalona" ("Wizard of Ascalon") shows him a vision of the future in the shield, including the glories of the House of Este (Tasso drops in several prophecies of the time between 1099 and his own at various points). Rinaldo resolves to pursue the crusade with all his might (Canto 17). Armida is grief-stricken and raises an army to kill Rinaldo and fight the Christians, but her champions are all defeated. She attempts to commit suicide, but Rinaldo finds her in time and prevents her. Rinaldo then begs her to convert to Christianity, and Armida, her heart softened, consents (Canto 20).

== Renaud and Saint Reinold ==
The manner of Renauld's death appears to be identical in both method and location to the martyrdom of Saint Reinold at Cologne in 960. Continental sources, including guides to Dortmund where Reinold is patron saint of both town and cathedral, routinely equate Renaud with the martyred monk.

== Modern versions ==
During the German occupation of Belgium during World War II, the story of Les Quatre Fils Aymon was made into a play that was banned by the German authorities, because of the sympathy it displayed for resisting authority; the play was performed underground and became quite popular.

Rinaldo (played by Leigh McCloskey) features in the 1983 Italian film I paladini - Storia d'armi e d'amori (aka Hearts and Armour).

== Ship name ==
Four successive ships of the British Royal Navy were named HMS Rinaldo for this character.
