= Duke Aymon =

Duke Aymon of Dordone (Italian: Amone, German: Haimon) is a character in the Old French Matter of France, appearing in chansons de geste and Italian romance epics depicting the adventures of Charlemagne and his knights. The son of Doon de Mayence, he is the Duke of Dordone (sometimes associated with Dordogne) and the father of four sons, Renaud, Guichard, Alard and Richard, who are the heroes of Les Quatre Fils Aymon or The Four Sons of Aymon.

Aymon is also a character in Orlando Furioso, along with his sons Renaud (Rinaldo), Alard (Alardo) and Richard (Ricciardo), and his daughter, the female warrior Bradamante.

== See also ==
- Heime
- Naimon, Duke of Bavaria, another of Charlemagne's legendary peers.
