= The Four Sons of Aymon =

Medieval tale

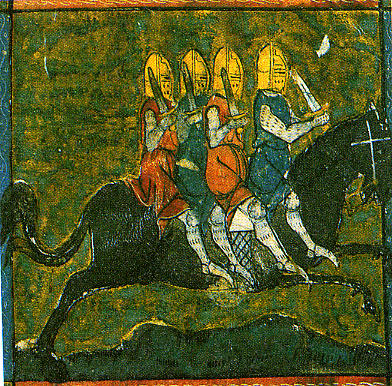
The horse Bayard carrying the four sons of Aymon, miniature in a manuscript from the 14th century

The Four Sons of Aymon (French: [Les] Quatre fils Aymon, is a medieval tale centring around the four sons of Duke Aymon: the knight Renaud de Montauban, his brothers Guichard, Allard and Richardet, their magical horse Bayard, and their adventures and revolt against Emperor Charlemagne. It is sometimes also referred to as Renaud de Montauban, after its main character. The story became popular throughout Europe, and echoes of the story are still found today in certain folklore traditions.

== Medieval and Renaissance texts ==
=== French versions ===
The oldest extant version of the tale is an anonymous Old French chanson de geste, Quatre Fils Aymon, which dates from the late 12th century and comprises 18,489 alexandrine (12-syllable) verses grouped in assonanced and rhymed laisses (the first 12,120 verses use assonance; critics suggest that the rhymed laisses derive from a different poet). It is one of the longest of all the chansons de geste. Other and later versions of the chanson range from 14,300 to 28,000 verses. Of the dozen extant versions of the chanson, all are anonymous except for one, Histoire des quatre fils Aymon, attributed to Huon de Villeneuve, a 13th-century trouvère. The Renaud chansons de geste were transformed into prose romances in the 14th and 15th centuries, and judging from the number of editions, the prose Quatre Fils Aymon was the most popular romance of chivalry in the late 15th century and first half of the 16th century in France.

The tale is generally included in the Doon de Mayence "cycle" of chansons.

==== Plot ====
Renaud and his three brothers were sons of Aymon de Dordone (a fictional location in the Ardennes, although the name seems to be related to Dordogne near Montauban). At the Pentecostal feast, Aymon brought them to Paris to be presented to Emperor Charlemagne and Renaud proved himself a worthy combatant in the royal tournament and won the emperor's favour. In most versions of the chanson, the emperor presented him with the magical horse Bayard (in two versions, it is the fairy Oriande who gives it to him). Renaud kills one of Charlemagne's nephews (Bertolai) in a brawl over a chess game and the brothers flee, aided by Bayard who can carry all the brothers on his back and leap across valleys.

The brothers decide to hide in the Ardennes where their cousin, the sorcerer Maugis, can help them. Maugis constructs a castle for them called Montessor on a peak overlooking the Meuse. The brothers are, however, forced to flee from Montessor, and eventually they proceed to Gascony to aid King Yvon in his battles against the Emir Begès. Renaud, thanks to his sword "Froberge" (given to him by Maugis), wins a victory, and in gratitude, the king gives Renaud the castle at Montauban and his sister in marriage.

After a series of adventures, Charlemagne is eventually prevailed upon by the noble paladin Roland to make terms with the brothers: the four brothers are pardoned on condition that Renaud travels to the Holy Land on Crusade, and that their magical horse Bayard is surrendered to Charlemagne. Charlemagne orders that Bayard be drowned by chaining him to a stone and throwing him in a river, but the horse escapes and lives eternally in the woods (in some versions the horse is killed). Renaud, upon his return from the Crusades, discovers his wife has died. After sending his sons to be educated at the court of the emperor, he abandons his home and goes to Cologne, where he helps to construct a church. In the end, he is murdered by resentful workers, but his body is miraculously saved from the river and makes its way magically in a cart back to his brothers.

Charlemagne is portrayed as vengeful and treacherous in these stories; the sympathy of the storyteller is clearly with the four brothers, but ultimately feudal authority is upheld.

=== Dutch version ===
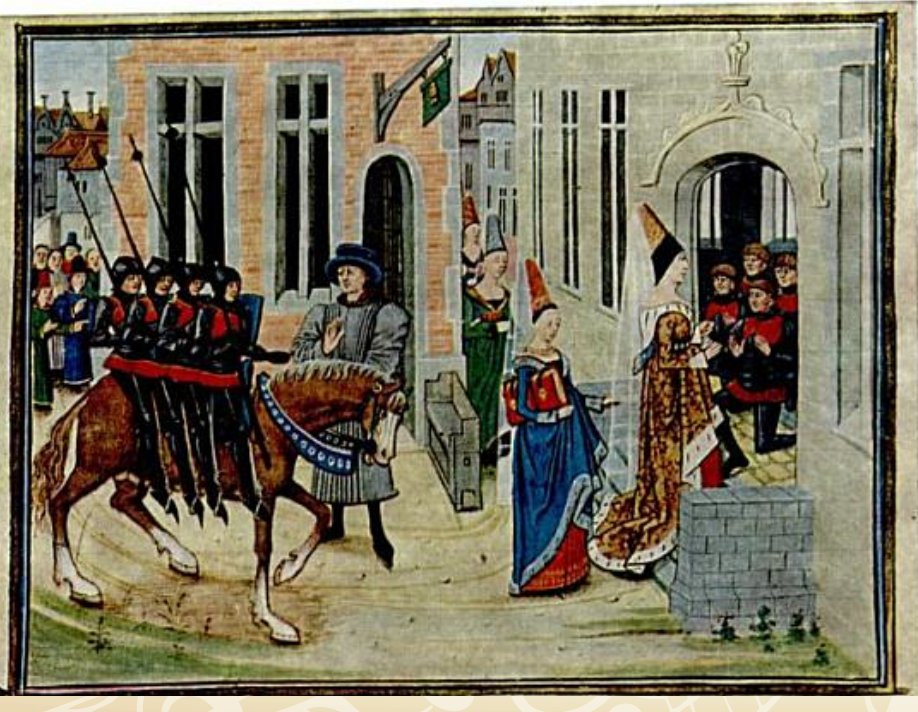
The arrival of the four sons (riding the horse Bayard) in Dordonne, after their exile in the forest. Medieval manuscript by Loyset Liédet

Historie van den Vier Heemskinderen, the Dutch translation, dated 1508 and held at LMU Munich gives the following version:

Duke Aymon, King of Pierlepont, thinks that Charles, his liege lord, has not shown him sufficient gratitude when he is merely awarded Dordogne (Dordoen) with the capital of Albi for his help in many of Charles's wars. He is even angrier about the fact that his warrior friend Hugh (Huon) de Narbonne gets nothing at all, and decides to turn renegade until Charlemagne gives him a suitable reward. In the end Charles adds Aymon's weight in gold and his sister Aye. However, Aymon is not yet truly satisfied and swears that he will kill any child born out of his union with the king's sister, a truly curious resolution.

Aye brings up her four sons (Richard, Writsaert, Adelhaert and Renout in this version) in secret at Pierlepont until the day that Aymon tells her how he regrets the fact that they have no offspring. She shows him his sons and Aymon is very impressed with Renaud, who is very tall, strong and belligerent. He gives Renaud the horse Bayard. The horse is so large that it can carry all four brothers on his back. When the four brothers are presented at Charles's court in Paris, Renaud kills Charles's son Louis. He and his brothers flee to the court of King Loup de Gascogne who betrays them to Charles. Nevertheless, they escape their pursuers with the help of King Son of Aquitaine, who gives his daughter Claire or Clarisse to Renaud in marriage, as well as the castle of Montauban.

Charles attacks the castle, and after months of siege Renaud has to surrender. The cost of their survival is the drowning of his horse Bayard. Charles urges Renaud to go on a pilgrimage to the Holy Land, especially Jerusalem. When Renaud comes back he helps to build the shrine of St. Peter in Cologne. Envious men kill him and throw his body in the River Rhine.

=== German versions ===
Ein schöne und lüstige Histori von den vier Heymonskindern appeared in Cologne in 1604. This was largely an adaptation of the then current Dutch version, based on a French original. A previous German adaptation dated 1535 was based directly on the prose romance Les quatre fils Aymon. Ludwig Tieck edited and published the story, but seems to have taken it from a different source.

=== English version ===
The story was known in England by the first half of the 13th century. and William Caxton published a prose translation under the name "The Right Pleasant and Goodly Historie of the Foure Sonnes of Aymon". The translation was repeatedly reprinted, as well as dramatised, in the 16th and early 17th centuries, and its popular story was referred to (and used) by persons such as Thomas Nashe and Samuel Rowlands, although by 1673 Francis Kirkman would call the text a rarity.

=== Italian version ===
A prose and a verse version of the story called Rinaldo existed in Italian in the 14th century.

=== Sequels and related texts ===
From the 13th century on, other texts concerning separate elements of the extended Renaud de Montauban story were created. Together with the original, these are termed the "Renaud de Montauban cycle". These poems are: Maugis d'Aigremont (describing Maugis's childhood), Mort de Maugis (describing Maugis's death), Vivien de Monbranc (the story of Maugis's brother), Beuve d'Aigremont (the story of Maugis's father, Beuve d'Aigremont, brother to Girart de Roussillon and Doon de Nanteuil).

Renaud, as Rinaldo, also became an important character in Italian Renaissance epics, including Morgante by Luigi Pulci, Orlando Innamorato by Matteo Maria Boiardo and Orlando Furioso by Ludovico Ariosto.

== In other media ==
=== Literature ===
Proust briefly makes use of this tale in "Swann in Love" by describing chemical workers in France toiling among sculptures of this tale's characters.

=== Visual arts ===
Jacques Laudy illustrated a comic strip version of the tale for the weekly Franco-Belgian comics magazine Tintin from 1946 to 1947 (including several covers).

=== Music and performing arts ===
Franz Joseph Glæser, a Czech/Danish composer, wrote a work called Die vier Haimonskinder (1809).

Les quatre fils Aymon (1844) is an opera by Michael William Balfe, written for the Opéra-Comique (also popular in German-speaking countries for many years as Die Vier Haimonskinder).

During the German occupation of Belgium during World War II, the story of Les Quatre Fils Aymon was made into a play that was banned by the German authorities, because of the sympathy it displayed for resisting authority; the play was performed underground and became quite popular.

La Légende des fils Aymon, a stage work by Frédéric Kiesel, was created in 1967 in Habay-la-Neuve.

Les Quatre Fils Aymon is a ballet by Maurice Béjart and Janine Charrat from 1961.

=== Sculpture ===
The four brothers - usually represented all together seated on their horse Bayard - have inspired many sculptures:

- The oldest extant statue is on a tomb in Portugal (dated the first half of the 12th century).
- A bronze statue (Ros Beyaert) depicting the four sons on Beyaert (Bayard) was erected on the central approach avenue to the Exposition universelle et internationale (1913) held in Ghent, Belgium. This statue was created by Aloïs de Beule and Domien Ingels.
- One of the most famous representations was created by Olivier Strebelle for the Expo 58. Situated by the Meuse in Namur, Belgium, the horse appears to be on the point of jumping across the river with all four brothers on his back.
- Another statue created by Albert Poncin, showing the four brothers standing beside their horse, can be found at Bogny-sur-Meuse, France.
- There are several statues representing the brothers in Dendermonde (Belgium).
- The statue Vier Heemskinderen (1976) by Gerard Adriaan Overeem was placed in the Torenstraat in Nijkerk, Netherlands.
- A bronze sculpture in Cologne, Germany, made in 1969 by Heinz Klein-Arendt, depicts them.
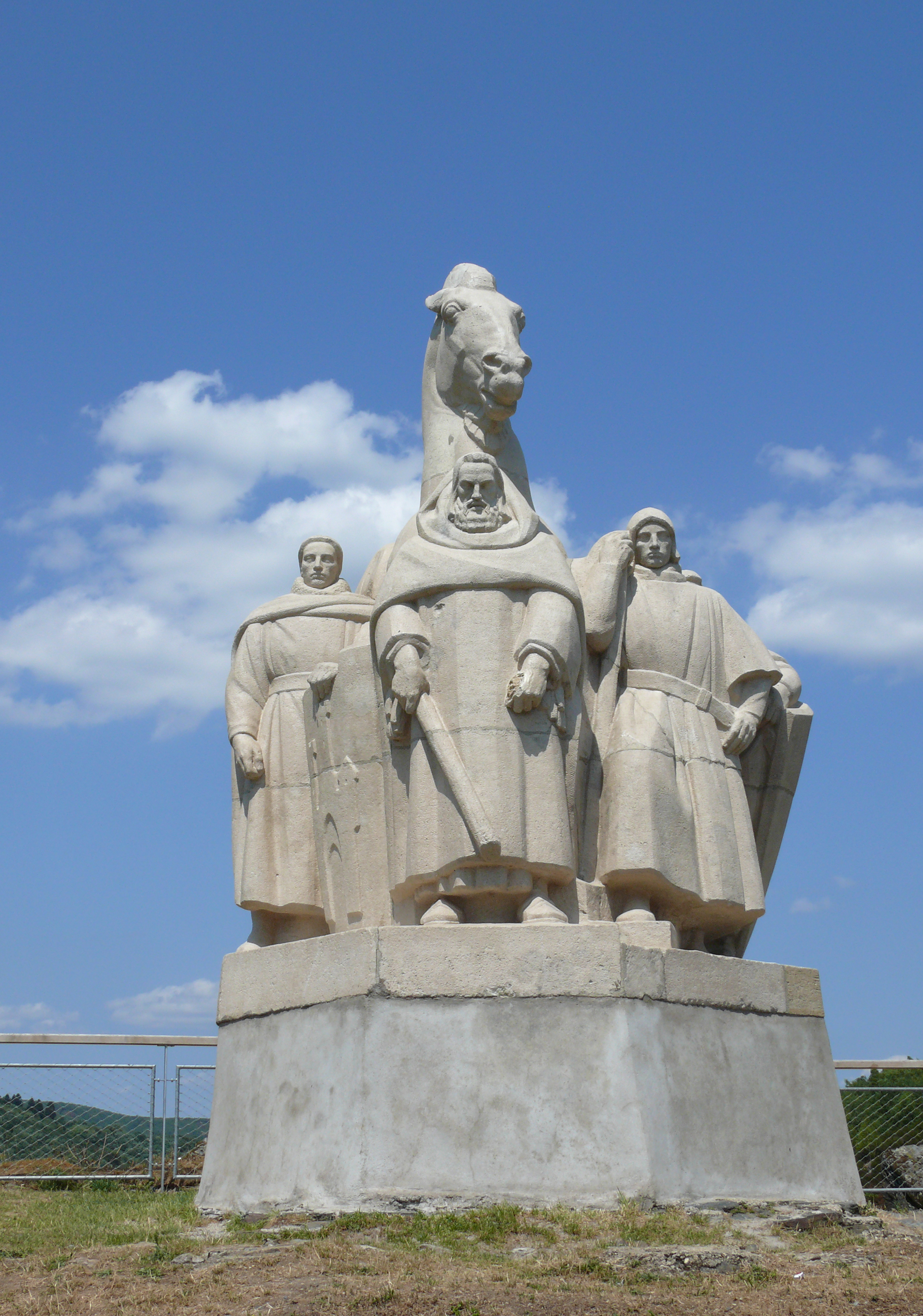
Monument des Quatre Fils Aymon in Bogny-sur-Meuse, France

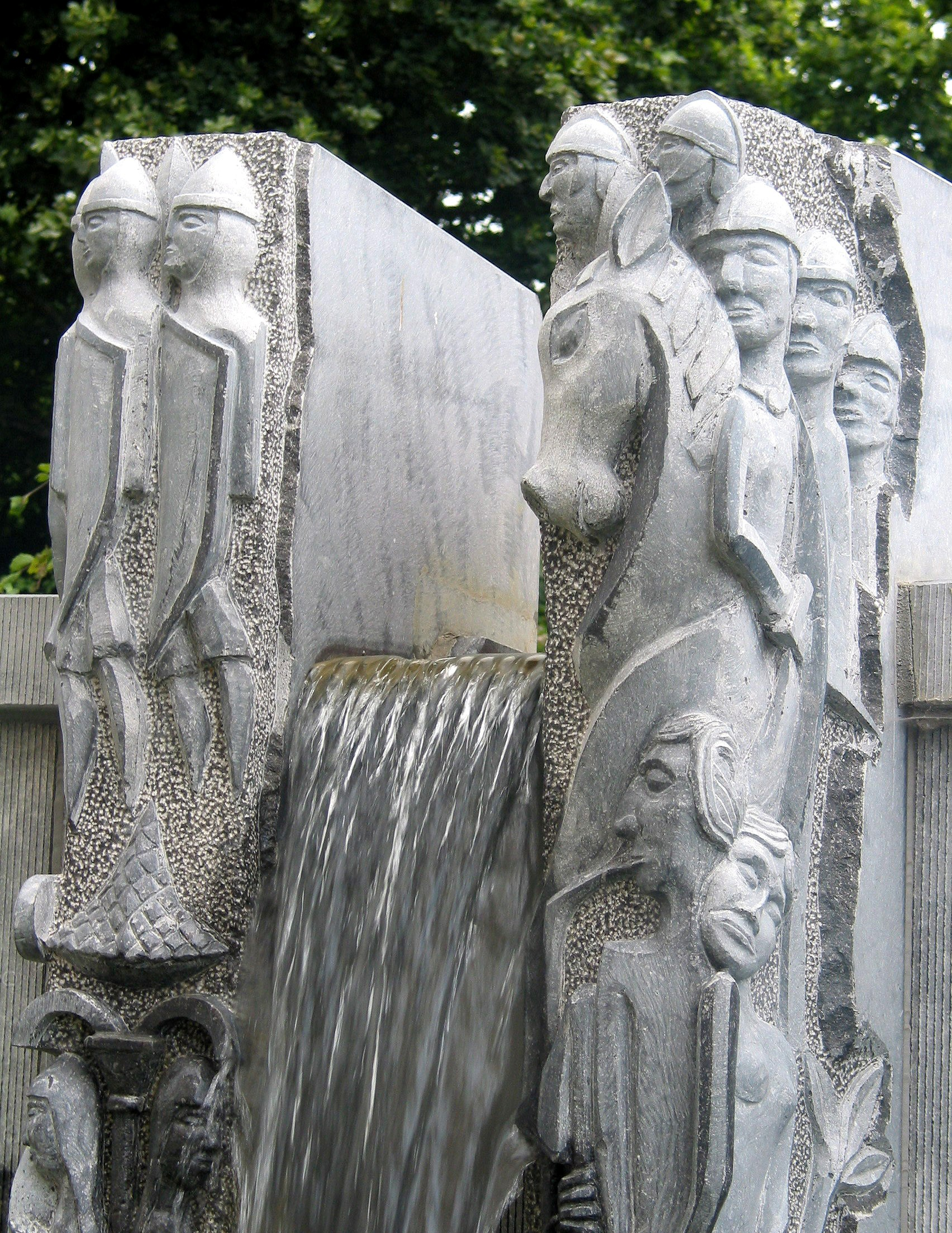
The fountain des Quatre Fils Aymon in Orp-le-Grand (near Orp-Jauche), Belgium

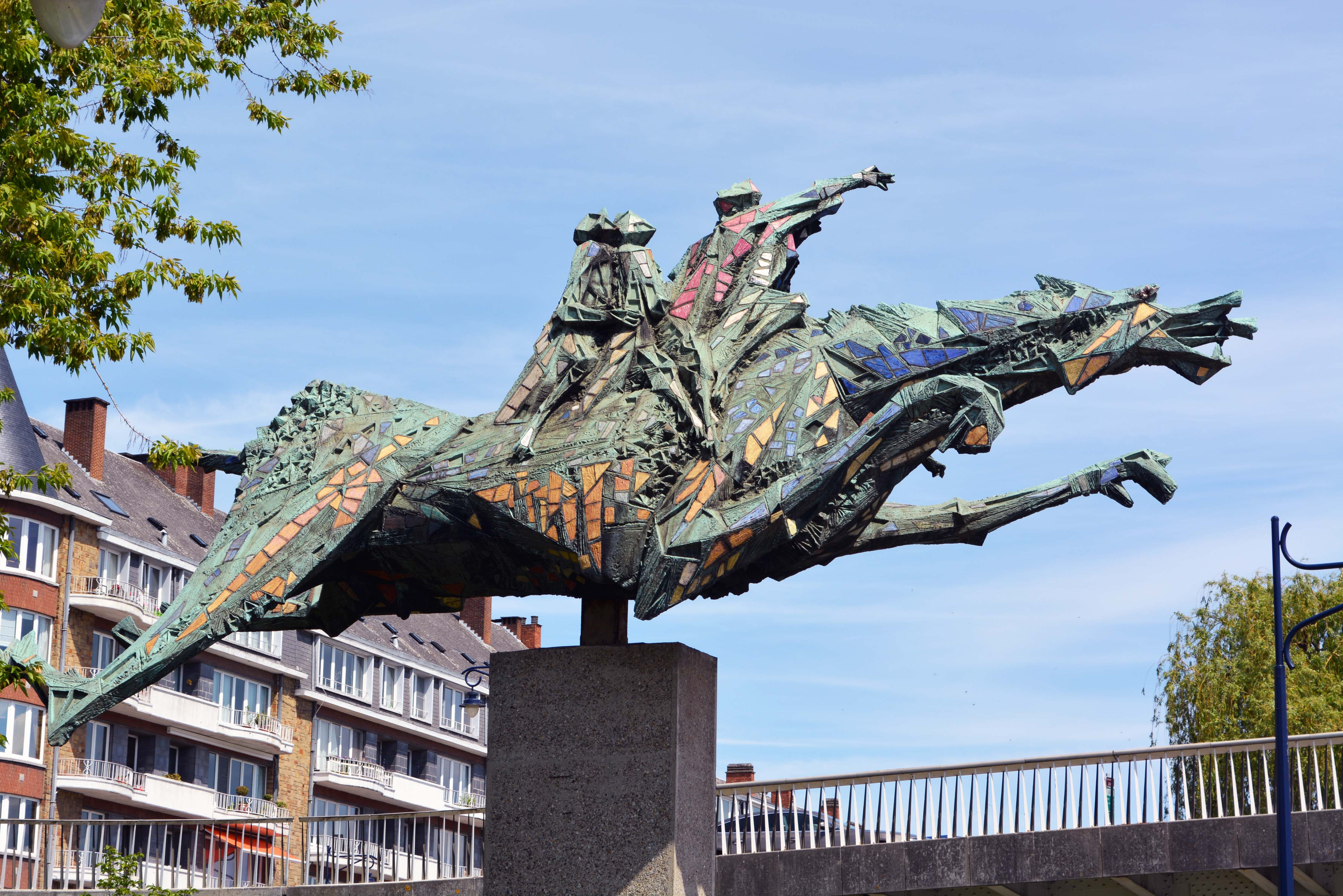
The horse Bayard in Namur, Belgium

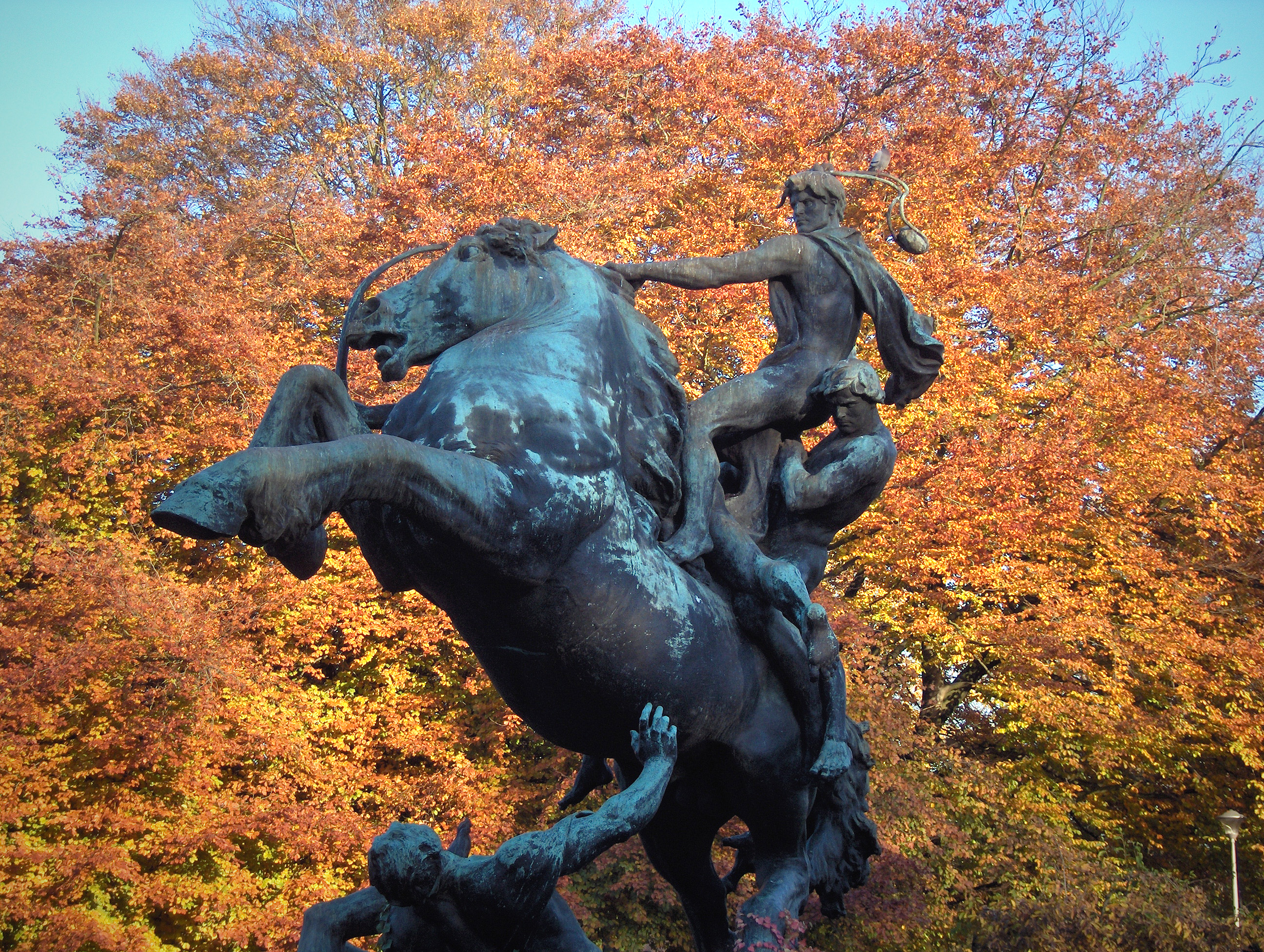
Ros Beyaert in Ghent, Belgium

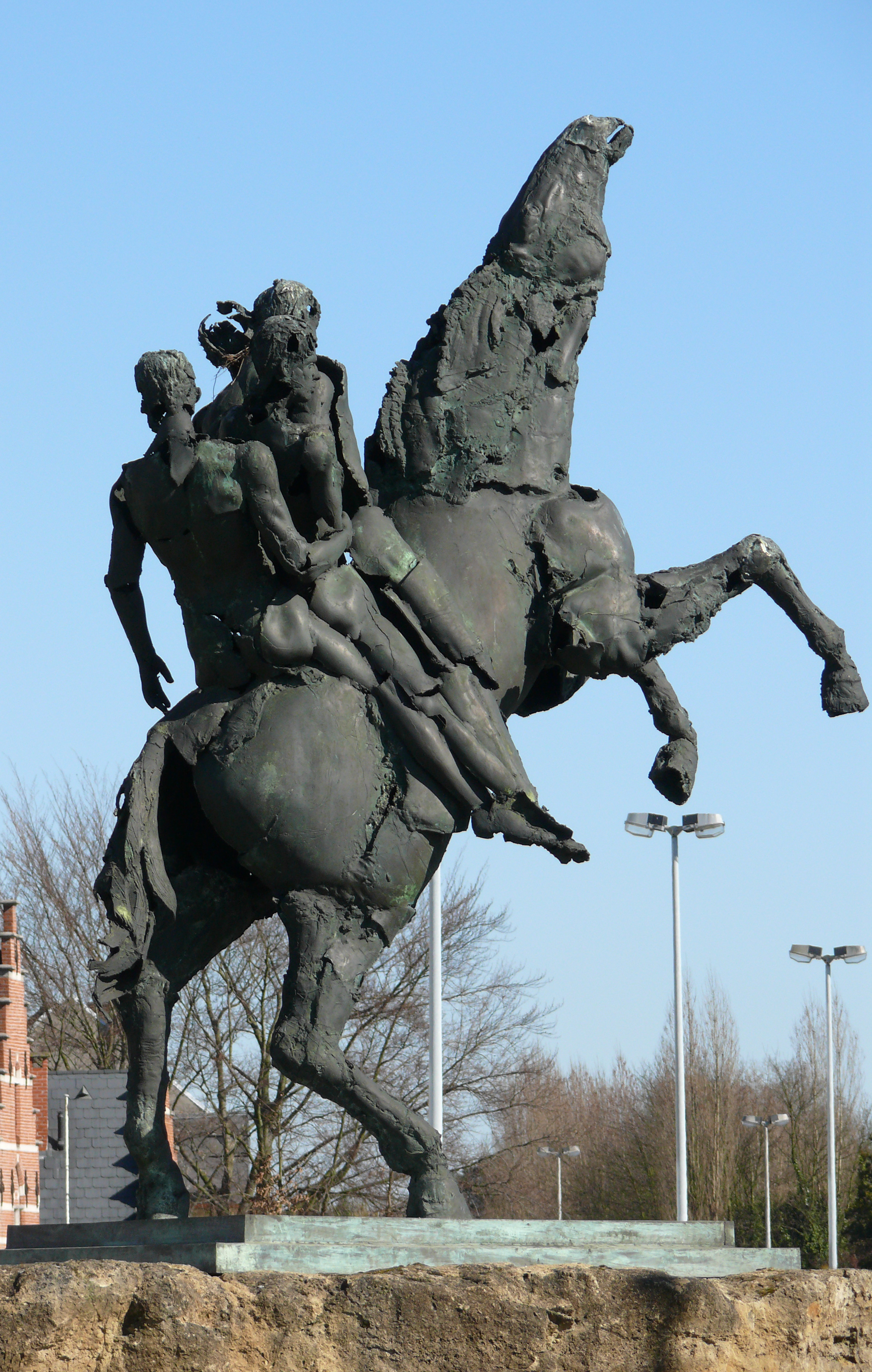
Statue in Dendermonde, Belgium

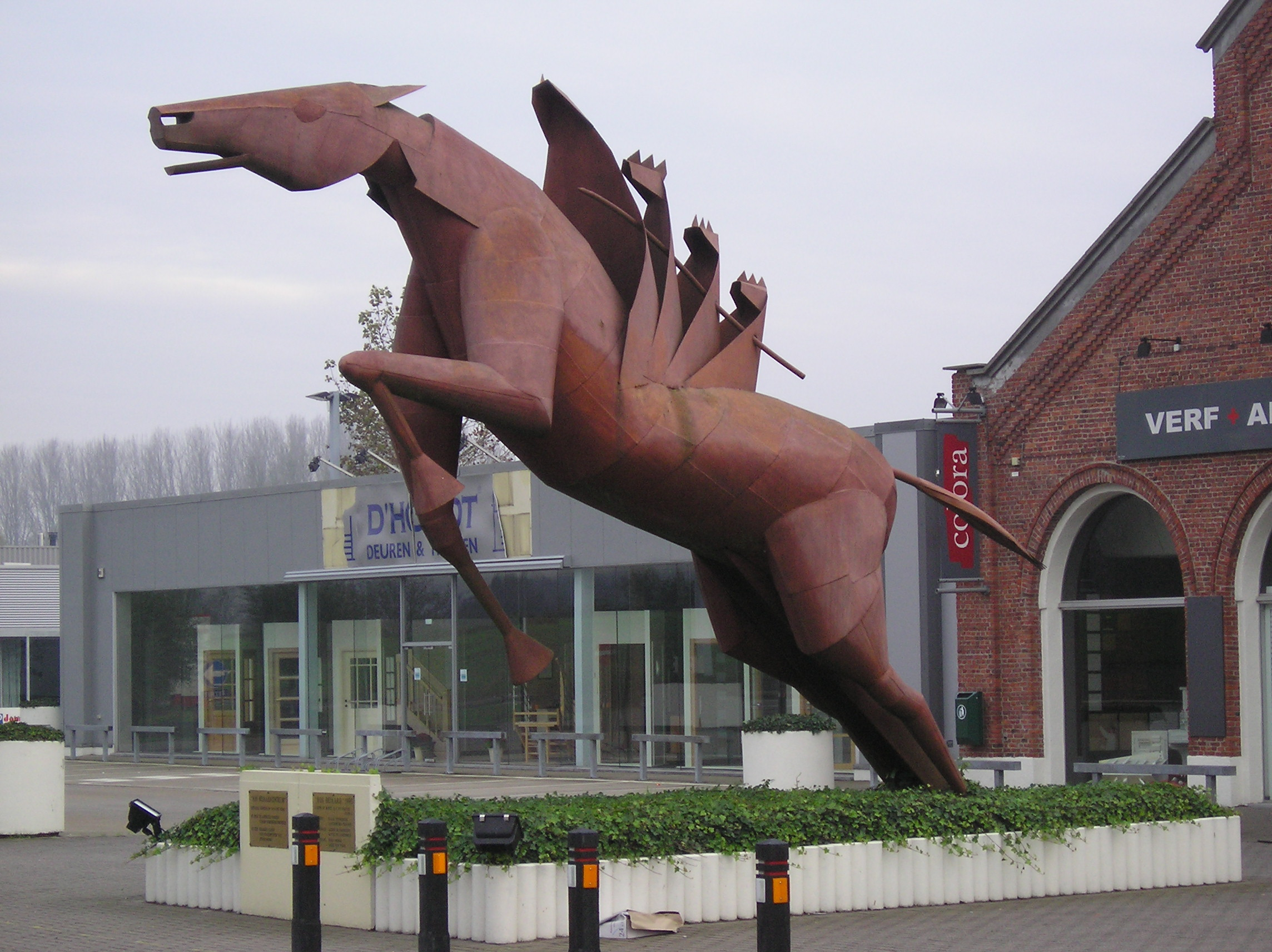
Sculpture in Grembergen, Belgium

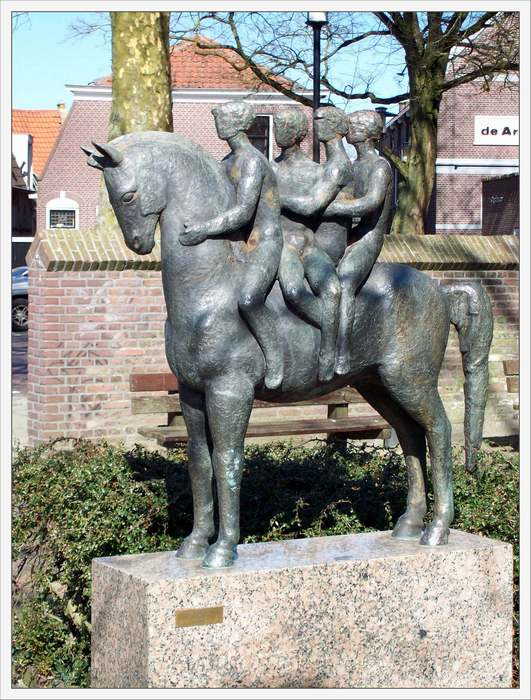
Vier Heemskinderen in Nijkerk, Netherlands

== Folklore ==
=== Locations and place names ===
While the Ardennes region (divided today between France, Belgium and Luxembourg) only plays a fairly minor role in the medieval tale, the story of the four brothers has been very present there.

Joseph Bédier considered the Abbey of Stavelot-Malmédy to be the origin of the legend of the four brothers, but this has since been disproved.

A study by the University of Liège in 1976 found a dozen sites in the Ardennes that claimed to be the fortress Montessor (or Montfort) constructed for the brothers by Maugis. The château of Amblève is one of these. Dhuy (near Éghezée) possesses an old castle called "Bayard" in 1770, that was also called "Montessor des fils Aymon".

There is a castle named after the four brothers in Cubzac-les-Ponts in the Dordogne region.

Bertem, near Louvain, claimed to possess the relics of one of the sons, Saint Aalard (or Alard), for 600 years.

Bogny-sur-Meuse has a number of sites referencing the four brothers: four rocky crags on a mountain peak near the town are said to symbolise the four brothers on Bayard's back, and the castle of Château-Regnault has been proposed as a possible site for Montfort/Montessor. The Castle of the fairies at Le Waridon in the commune of Montcy-Notre-Dame has also been proposed.

According to a tale told by (among others) Claude Seignolle, the village of Francheval owes its name to the legend of the brothers: "Having shown great bravery to help Renaud and one of his brothers, the latter said to Bayard: 'Tu es un brave, Bayard, franc cheval!' ('You are a brave one, Bayard, noble horse!'), and at this site the village of Francheval was established". A similar legend relates to the creation of the village of Balan: as the brothers, all astride Bayard, were being pursued, the horse made a huge leap and fell to the ground; Renaud cried out to his brothers, "Balan!", ("Get back in the saddle!"), and the village was thus named.

In Dinant there exists the "Bayard Rock" (Rocher Bayard) that was said to have been split by the giant hoof of Bayard while carrying the four sons of Aymon on their legendary flight from Charlemagne through the Ardennes.

The ancient County of La Marche was the fief of the lords of La Roche-Aymon who claimed to have descended from the four brothers.

=== Processions and festivals ===
The sons of Aymon are included among the "giants of the north" in Belgian folk festivals.

A procession in Namur has been attested in 1518. The procession of "giants" - which is held annually on 2 July - represents Charlemagne, the nine worthy peers, the four sons of Aymon upon their horse, and their cousin Maugis.

Attested before 1461 in Dendermonde, the "Ommegang of Dendermonde" is a procession concerning the four brothers and their horse, who is said to have drowned where the Scheldt meets the Dender.

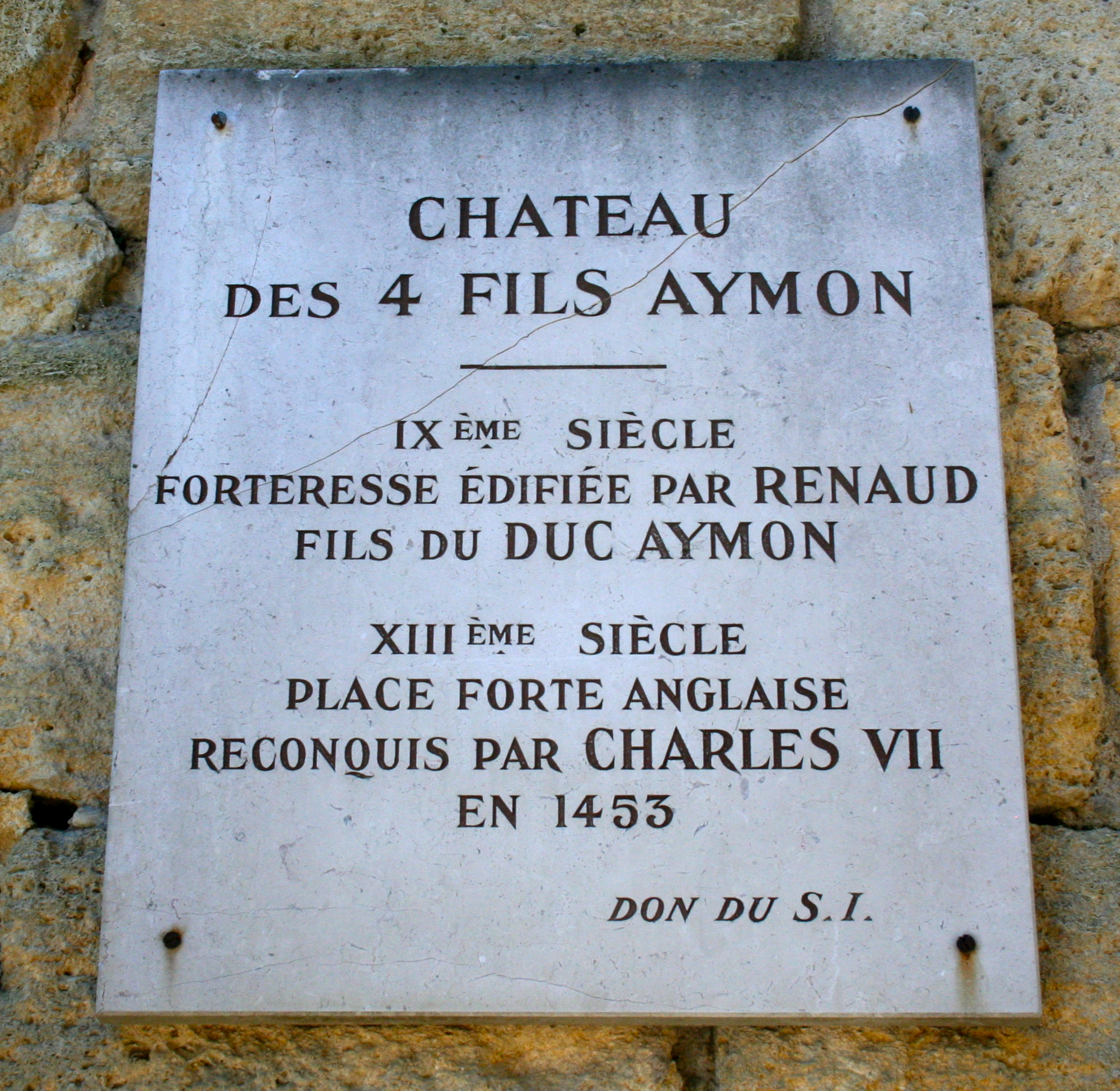
A plaque for the "château des quatre fils Aymon" in Cubzac-les-Ponts

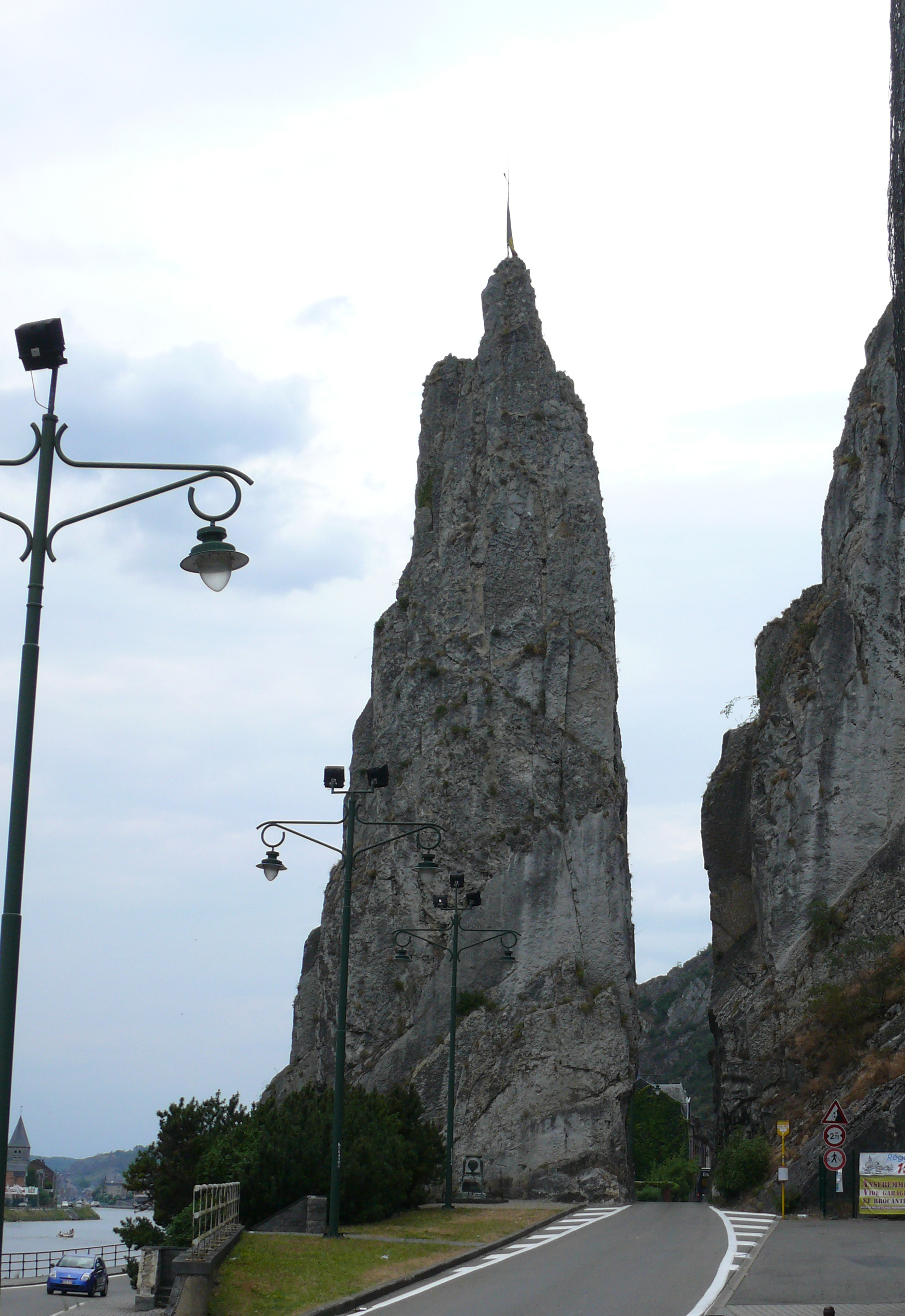
The "Bayard rock" of Dinant

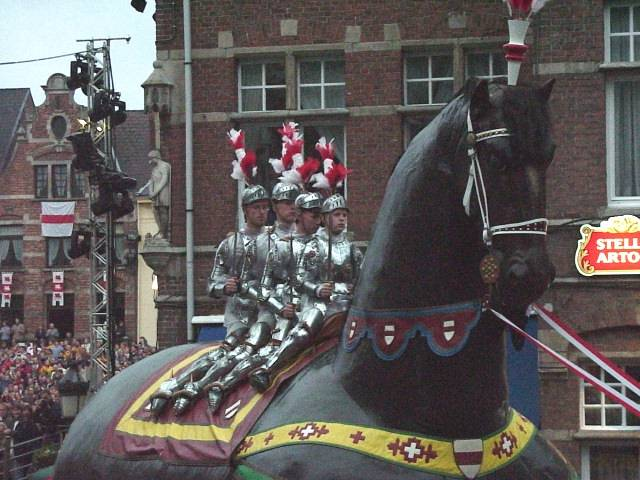
The horse Bayard of Dendermonde in 1990, ridden by four riders depicting the sons of Aymon
