= Grembergen =

Grembergen Grembergen-lez-Termonde
- Village
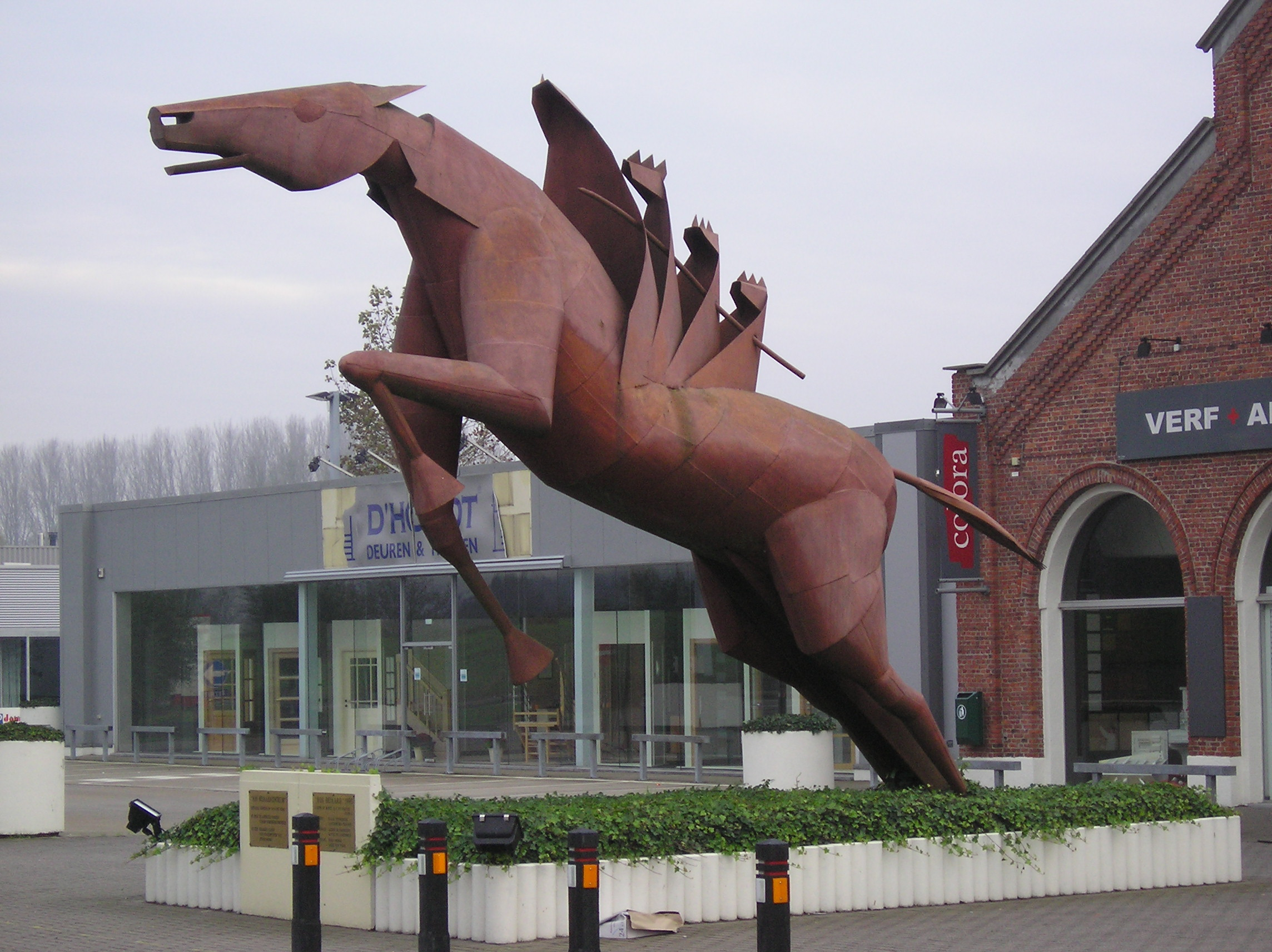
- Ros Beiaard in Grembergen

- Location in Belgium
- Coordinates: 51°03′N 04°06′E
- Country: Belgium
- Region: Flemish Region
- Province: East Flanders
- Municipality: Dendermonde

Area
  - Total: 10.06 km^{2} (3.88 sq mi)

Population (2021)
  - Total: 7,215
  - Density: 717.2/km^{2} (1,858/sq mi)
- Time zone: CET

Grembergen (French: Grembergen-lez-Termonde) is a village in the municipality of Dendermonde in the Denderstreek in the province of East Flanders in Belgium. It is often confused with the municipality of Grimbergen in the province of Flemish Brabant.

Coat of arms of Grembergen

== Overview ==
Grembergen was first mentioned in 1019 as Grendberga. During the 13th and 14th century, the village was reasonably prosperous as a centre of lace production. The village was flooded several times.

The old church was destroyed in 1706 by French troops. In 1709, the Saint Margaretha church was built partially from scavenged material of the old church.

== Born in Grembergen ==
- Frans Baert (1925–2022), lawyer, politician and philosopher.
- Fernand Khnopff (1858–1921), symbolist painter.
