= Hearts and Armour =

- French theatrical poster
- Directed by: Giacomo Battiato
- Written by: Giacomo Battiato
- Based on: Orlando Furioso by Ludovico Ariosto
- Produced by: Nicola Carraro
- Cinematography: Dante Spinotti
- Edited by: Ruggero Mastroianni
- Music by: David A. Hughes; Martin Cooper
- Production company: Vides Cinematografica
- Distributed by: Warner Bros. (U.S.)
- Release date: September 21, 1983 (Italy)
- Running time: 98 minutes
- Country: Italy
- Languages: English; Italian

Hearts and Armour (Italian: I Paladini: Storia d'armi e d'amori) is a 1983 Italian adventure film directed by Giacomo Battiato. It is loosely based on the stories of the Paladins especially the epic poem Orlando Furioso by Ludovico Ariosto.

== Plot ==
In a war between pagans and Christians, the Saracen Ruggero and Christian Bradamante fall in love. A sorceress warns Bradamante that Ruggero will be killed in battle by the paladin Rolando, who is himself in love with Ruggero’s sister, Isabella. After escaping captivity, Isabella is pursued by enemies, while Rolando searches for her. Meanwhile, the wizard Atlas tries to protect Ruggero from his fate but gives up when he sees the prince is distracted by love and the attention of the warrior Marfisa.

Rolando and Isabella eventually meet but accept that their love has caused too much suffering and return to their respective sides. As the armies prepare for battle, Bradamante tries to prevent the prophesied duel between Rolando and Ruggero. To save Ruggero, Marfisa takes his place and is killed instead. Ruggero initially seeks revenge, but Rolando refuses to fight him. Ruggero forgives him and is reunited with Bradamante, who believed he was dead. After Marfisa’s funeral, Ruggero, Bradamante, Rolando, and Isabella leave together to begin a new life.

== Cast ==
- Zeudi Araya as Marfisa
- Barbara De Rossi as Bradamante
- Rick Edwards as Rolando
- Ronn Moss as Ruggiero
- Maurizio Nichetti as Atlante
- Tanya Roberts as Isabella
- Giovanni Visentin as Gano
- Tony Vogel as Ferraù
- Leigh McCloskey as Rinaldo
- Lina Sastri as Maga
- Lucien Bruchon as Aquilante
- Alfredo Bini as King Cristiano
- Pier Luigi Conti (Al Cliver) as Selvaggio

== Reception ==
The film was generally panned by critics, but appreciated on its visual side. The Sydney Morning Herald wrote "The settings are sensational, the costumes are magnificent. The story, on the other hand, is almost non-existent". Starburst said it's "the best film to come out of Italy in a long while." Hearts and Armour won the David di Donatello for Best Costumes. A much longer version of the film was broadcast as a mini-series on Italian television.
