= Brunello (character) =

Fictional dwarf in the romantic epics Orlando innamorato and Orlando furioso

Brunello is a character in the Italian romantic epics Orlando Innamorato by Matteo Maria Boiardo and Orlando Furioso by Ludovico Ariosto. Brunello is a dwarf and a cunning thief who works for the Saracen army of King Agramante. He first appears in the second book of Orlando Innamorato where Agramante intends to invade Europe and defeat Emperor Charlemagne. He has been told he has no chance of success unless he has the young warrior Ruggiero on his side, but Ruggiero has been hidden in a secret garden by the wizard Atlante and the only way to reach him is by using the magic ring belonging to Princess Angelica. Brunello undertakes to steal it and sets off for the fortress of Albracca where he not only manages to snatch the ring but also robs King Sacripante of his horse (from right underneath him) and the female warrior Marfisa of her sword. Marfisa sets off in pursuit but Brunello evades her and gives the ring to Agramante, who rewards him with a kingdom. The Saracens find Ruggiero at Mount Carena where they see him behind a wall of glass. However, the wall is too steep and slippery to climb, so Brunello suggests they trick Ruggiero out. He gets them to play war games in the plain beneath the mountain. Ruggiero, with his inherent love of combat, cannot resist and despite Atlante's pleas he leaves the garden and begs Brunello for his horse and armor. Brunello only agrees if he will join their expedition against France, to which Ruggiero happily consents.

In Orlando Furioso, Brunello is entrusted with the ring by Agramante. The female warrior Bradamante is in love with Ruggiero, who has been taken captive. She consults Merlin, who tells her she must kill Brunello and take the ring if she wants to free her beloved. She seizes the ring from Brunello but does not kill him and leaves him tied to a fir tree. Brunello is freed only to be caught by Marfisa, who wants her sword back. She hands him over to Agramante, who has Brunello hanged.

Ariosto describes him thus:

La sua statura, acciò tu lo conosca,

non è sei palmi, ed ha il capo ricciuto;

le chiome ha nere, ed ha la pelle fosca;

pallido il viso, oltre il dover barbuto;

gli occhi gonfiati e guardatura losca;

schiacciato il naso, e ne le ciglia irsuto:

l'abito, acciò ch'io lo dipinga intero,

è stretto e corto, e sembra di corriero.

(Orlando furioso, III.72)

That thou mayst recognise the man, in height

Less than six palms, observe one at this inn

Of black and curly hair, the dwarfish wight!

Beard overgrown about the cheek and chin;

With shaggy brow, swollen eyes, and cloudy sight,

A nose close flattened, and a sallow skin;

To this, that I may make my sketch complete,

Succinctly clad, like a courier, goes the cheat.

(Rose's translation)

== Sources ==
- Boiardo: Orlando innamorato ed. Giuseppe Anceschi (Garzanti,1978)
- Ariosto:Orlando Furioso, verse translation by Barbara Reynolds in two volumes (Penguin Classics, 1975). Part one (cantos 1-23) ISBN 0-14-044311-8; part two (cantos 24-46) ISBN 0-14-044310-X
- Ariosto: Orlando Furioso ed. Marcello Turchi (Garzanti, 1974)
