= Hippogriff =

Legendary creature

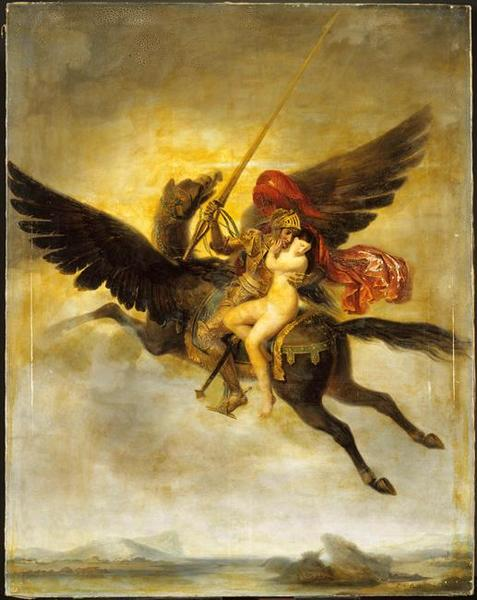
Roger délivrant Angélique (1824) by Louis-Édouard Rioult depicts the scene of Orlando Furioso where Ruggiero (French: Roger) rescues Angelica (French: Angélique) while riding on a hippogriff.

The hippogriff (Italian: ippogrifo) or hippogryph is a legendary creature with the front half of an eagle and the hind half of a horse.

It was invented at the beginning of the 16th century by Ludovico Ariosto in his Orlando Furioso. Within the poem, the hippogriff is a steed born of a mare and a griffin—something considered impossible. It is extremely fast and is presented as being able to fly around the world and to the Moon. Its original owner was the sorcerer Atlantes, a Saracen who lived in Mount Carena in Morocco and the knight errant (his adopted son) Ruggiero, who, from the creature's back, frees the beautiful Angelica. Astolfo also borrows the hippogriff from Bradamante to search for Roland's wits on the Moon.

The hippogriff became a subject of visual art in the 19th century, when it was often drawn by Gustave Doré.

== Etymology ==
The word hippogriff, also spelled hippogryph, is derived from the Ancient Greek: ἵππος híppos, meaning "horse", and the Italian grifo meaning "griffin" (from Latin: gryp or grypus from Ancient Greek: γρύψ, romanized: grýps), which denotes another mythical creature, with the head of an eagle and body of a lion, that is purported to be the father of the hippogriff. The word hippogriff was adopted into English shortly before 1615; prior to this, John Harington's 1591 translation of Orlando furioso called the creature a "Griffith horse."

The Hippogypians mentioned in Vera Historia, a fantastic travelogue written by the Roman author Lucian of Samosata in the Second Century A.D. suggest another likely source for the word. However, in that text, the term is used to refer to a race of moon-dwelling riders that employ gigantic three-headed vultures as steeds.

== Description ==
Of the heraldic representations of the hippogriff, Arthur Charles Fox-Davies states that hybrid fantastical creatures' depictions are "ugly, inartistic, and unnecessary. Their representation leaves one with a disappointed feeling of crudity of draughtsmanship." John Vinycomb states that the hippogriff is not used in the British heraldic tradition.

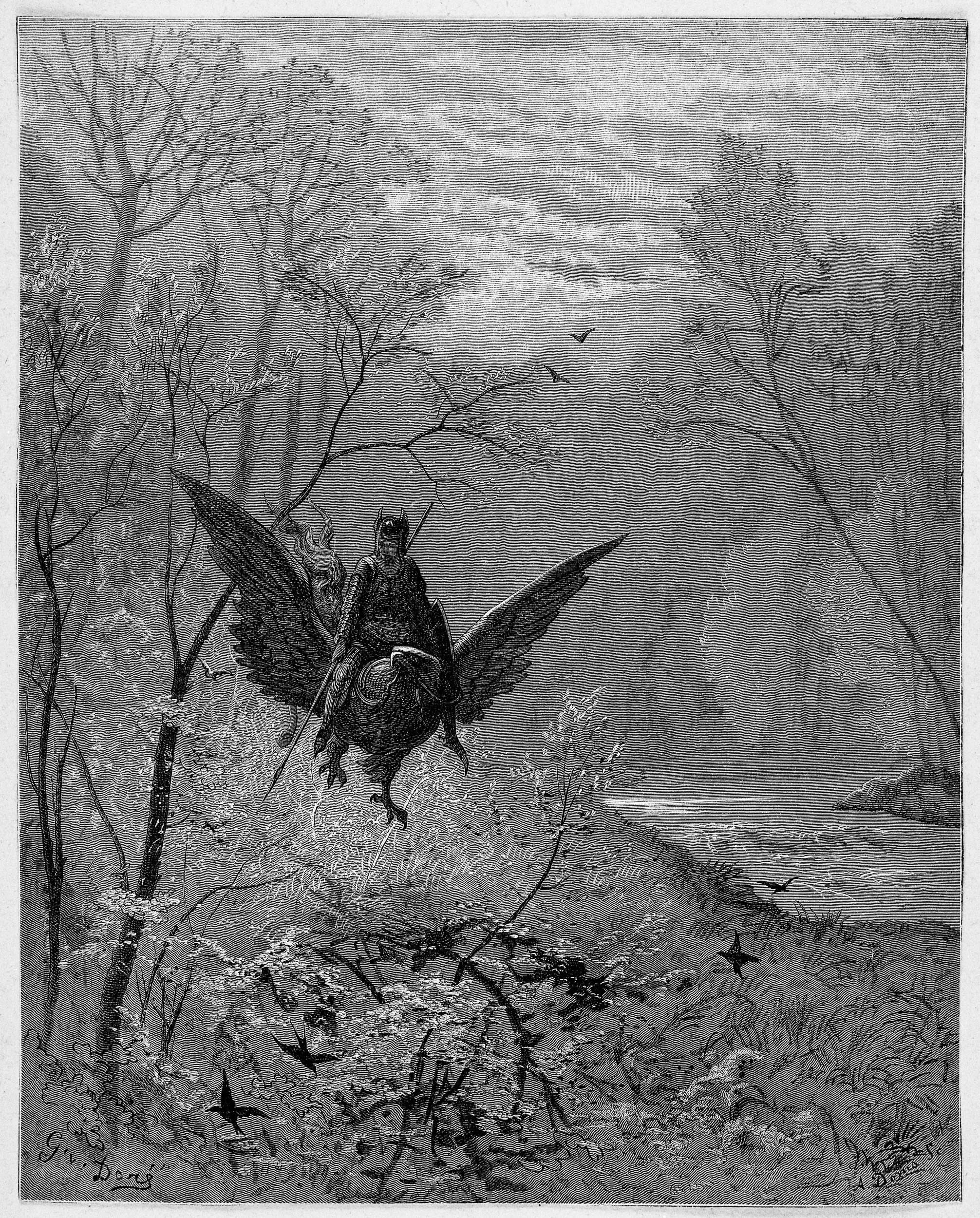
Hippogriff, illustration by Gustave Doré for Orlando furioso.

Ludovico Ariosto's poem, Orlando furioso (1516) contains the following description (canto IV):

XVIII
No fiction wrought magic lore,
But natural was the steed the wizard pressed;
For him a filly to griffin bore;
Hight hippogryph. In wings and beak and crest,
Formed like his sire, as in the feet before;
But like the mare, his dam, in all the rest.
Such on Riphaean hills, though rarely found,
Are bred, beyond the frozen ocean's bound.

XIX
Drawn by enchantment from his distant lair,
The wizard thought but how to tame the foal;
And, in a month, instructed him to bear
Saddle and bit, and gallop to the goal;
And execute on earth or in mid air,
All shifts of manege, course and caracole;
He with such labour wrought. This only real,
Where all the rest was hollow and ideal.

According to Thomas Bulfinch's Legends of Charlemagne:

Like a griffin, it has the head of an eagle, claws armed with talons, and wings covered with feathers, the rest of its body being that of a horse. This strange animal is called a Hippogriff. The hippogriff is said to be an evil spirit resting and possessing its soul in that of a horse and griffon.

== Beliefs and symbolism ==
According to Vidal, a Spanish historian, this creature was supposed to live near Céret, in the County of Roussillon of modern-day France, during the Middle Ages. Claw marks were found on a rock near Mas Carol. The belief in the existence of the hippogriff, such as Ariosto describes, is fiercely attacked in a scientific essay on religion in 1862, which argues that such an animal can neither be a divine creation, nor truly exist. The Book of Enoch quite clearly details how Satan and his fallen angels created various hybrids by admixture. The Sphinx is the best known such hybrid. The hippogriff is supposed to be a mixture of several animals and the author notes that in order to support its weight, the wings would be so heavy that flight would be impossible, which proves—without question—that it does not exist.

In some traditions, the hippogriff is said to be the symbol of love, as its parents, the mare and griffin, are natural enemies. In other traditions, the hippogriff represents Christ's dual nature as both human and divine.

== Modern representations ==
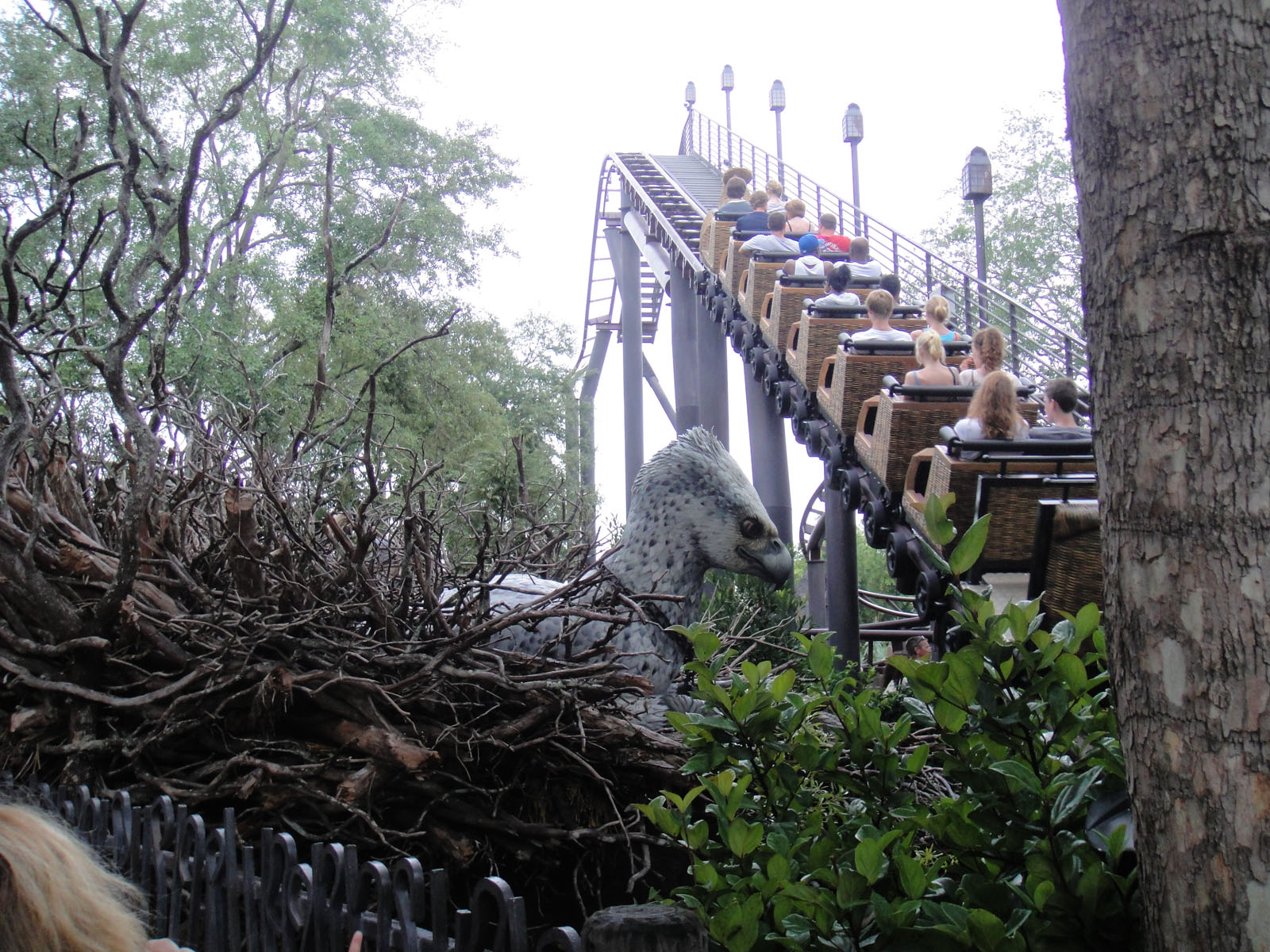
An animatronic Hippogriff in the nest on the left side of the lift hill of the roller coaster Flight of the Hippogriff in Orlando, Florida

- Artist Max Klinger used the hippogriff amongst other objects in his drawing Fantasy and the Artist to note his disparagement for artistic work that relies on out-worn and clichéd symbolism.
- In a hoax initially perpetrated in 1904 in Lake George, New York State, tricksters used a fake "monster" which became known as "The Hippogriff". The creation had a head of a bird of prey, teeth, and two large horse ears, which could be controlled from below. The pranks and sightings faded until 1999 when several people staying at the Island Harbour House Hotel stated they had seen a sea monster at night. The old hoax was uncovered by the Daily News and the Lake George Historical Association Museum, which created a copy of the original wooden monster to display to the public in August 2002.
- The hippogriff appears in various works of fantasy, such as works of E. Nesbit, E. R. Eddison's The Worm Ouroboros (1922) and a poem written for Mrs Angie Dyson by C. S. Lewis (between 1932 and 1936). It's also regularly alluded to as a fearsome monster by Bertie Wooster in P. G. Wodehouse's Jeeves stories.
- The fantasy role-playing game Dungeons & Dragons includes a version of the creature, which is described as having a horse's "ears, neck, mane, torso, and hind legs" and an eagle's "wings, forelegs, and face". According to the game's rules, the creatures are closely related to griffins and pegasi. Hippogriffs, pegasi, and horses are all hunted by griffins as the latter have a strong attraction to the flesh of horses. An artistic representation of the hippogriff drawing inspiration from real eagles and horses was used for the cover of the third booklet of the original Dungeons & Dragons (1974) edition.
- As with many ancient mythical beasts, a hippogriff named Buckbeak (subsequently "Witherwings") features prominently in Harry Potter. Buckbeak first appears in Harry Potter and the Prisoner of Azkaban and appears in later books as well. Peter Dendle says that the portrayal of the treatment of Buckbeak in the novels is one example that demonstrates "[t]he emotional need to express domination symbolically" as well as being one of the episodes that allows Harry to be shown as the "perennial liberator of all manner of creatures." Al Roker calls the creation of Buckbeak in the film Harry Potter and the Prisoner of Azkaban "one of the most magnificent and realistic creatures in film history." The character was used to create the theme for a roller coaster called Flight of the Hippogriff at the Florida amusement park The Wizarding World of Harry Potter in which the cars are wicker covered and pass by a statue of a hippogriff in a nest. Stefano Jossa has reconstructed the web of relations of Rowling's hippogriff.
- In the Digimon franchise, there is a Digimon called Hippogriffomon.
- Hippogriffs appeared in the 2017 film My Little Pony: The Movie, where they were transformed into seaponies. They were also featured in the season 8 premiere of the show, with the reoccurring character being Silverstream.
- In the anime Fate/Apocrypha, the Servant Astolfo, also known as Rider of Black, is able to summon a hippogriff that they use a mount with their Noble Phantasm Hippogriff. The hippogriff is considered to be a Phantasmal Species.
- Hippogriffs are ridden by the Knights of Bretonnia from the tabletop game Warhammer Fantasy, and also appear in the video game adaptation Total War: Warhammer.
- In the 11th book of the Fighting Fantasy gamebook series,Talisman of Death, the adventurer enjoys a plate of hippogriff in creamy sauce in one of Greyguilds-on-the-moor's many inns.

== See also ==
- Griffin
- Hippalectryon
- Pegasus
