= Sacripante =

Sacripante (also spelled Sacripant, Sacrepant and Sacrapant) is a character in the Italian romantic epics Orlando innamorato by Matteo Maria Boiardo and Orlando furioso by Ludovico Ariosto. Sacripante is the King of Circassia and one of the leading Saracen knights. He is passionately in love with Angelica and fights to defend her when she is besieged in the fortress of Albracca. His horse Frontino is stolen from underneath him by the cunning thief Brunello. In Orlando furioso he offers to become the wandering Angelica's protector but she evades him.

Sacripante is also the name of boastful character in Alessandro Tassoni's mock-epic poem La secchia rapita. Sacrapant is a wizard in George Peele's play The Old Wives' Tale (published 1595). Italian sacripante, as well as French sacripant, came to mean a rogue or a scoundrel. In Proust's In Search of Lost Time, Miss Sacripant is the name of Elstir's portrait of an actress disguised as a young man who is really Odette de Crécy.

== Sources ==
- Boiardo: Orlando innamorato ed. Giuseppe Anceschi (Garzanti,1978)
- Ariosto:Orlando Furioso, verse translation by Barbara Reynolds in two volumes (Penguin Classics, 1975). Part one (cantos 1–23) ISBN 0-14-044311-8; part two (cantos 24–46) ISBN 0-14-044310-X
- Ariosto: Orlando Furioso ed. Marcello Turchi (Garzanti, 1974)
