= Mandricardo =

Character in medieval works about France

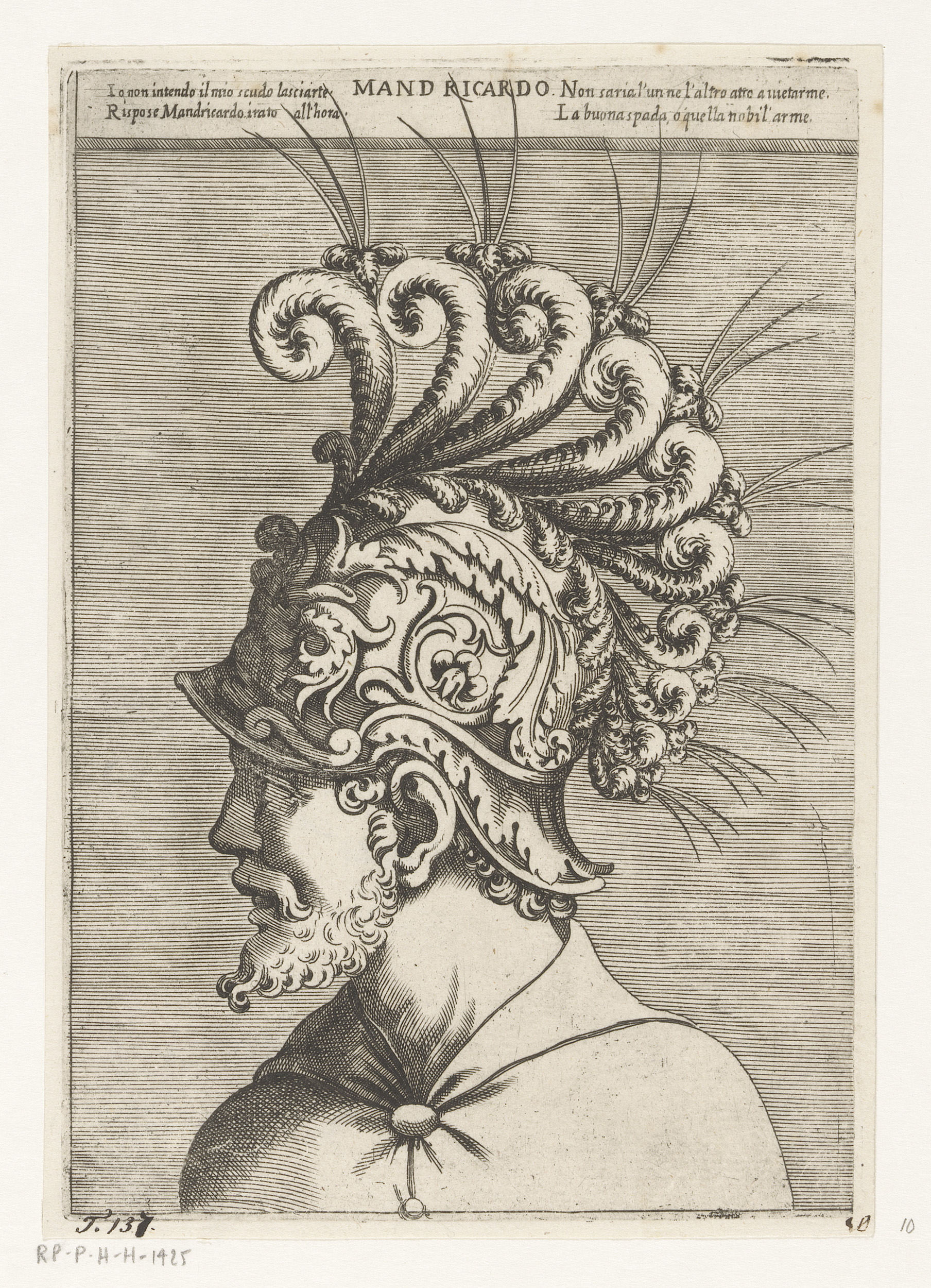
Mandricardo, Italian illustration of Orlando Furioso

Mandricardo is a character from the Matter of France, featured in the Italian romantic epic poems Orlando innamorato by Matteo Maria Boiardo and Orlando furioso by Ludovico Ariosto.

== Plot summary ==
Saracen king of the Tartars and emperor of Mongolia, Mandricardo is the son of Agricane, and an ally of Agramante (Saracen king of Africa who commands the kings of the countries subject to him, including Rodomonte and Mandricardo). In Orlando inamorato he discovers that his father was killed by Orlando, who also claimed Agricane's sword Durindana (Canto I).

In Orlando furioso he intends above all to avenge the death of his father. During this quest he meets and falls in love with the beautiful Doralice, princess of Granada, fiancee of Rodomonte (Canto XIV), later eloping with her and fighting his rival in love (Canti XXIV, XXVI, XXVII). Upon chasing Orlando the two duel for possession of the Durindana sword: but in the heat of the battle, Mandricardo's horse begins to flee and takes him well away from the place of the fight, followed closely by Doralice.(Canto XXIII).

Mandricardo finds Durindana and the pieces of armor that Orland threw away in his insanity and confronts Zerbino, who is on the place. He almost kills Zerbino, and would have done so if Doralice, at Isabella's request, hadn't asked him not to do it; the two go away. Zerbino soon perishes from many injuries sustained in the clash. Meanwhile, Mandricardo and Doralice meet Rodomonte, to whom the girl was betrothed: while the two are fighting, a messenger reaches them, because Marsilio has requested the intervention of all the knights scattered around the region to help against Carlo who is besieging the camps. Then, under pressure from Doralice, the two decide to suspend their resentment until the Christian threat is extinguished.(Canto XXIV)

In Canto XXVII Agramante decides to put order: the first question to be resolved is that between Rodomonte and Mandricardo for the love of Doralice. The choice is left to the girl, who chooses the second one: then Rodomonte in shame leaves the Saracen camp and heads into the woods. And then he in turn wants to challenge Mandricardo to a duel, but a strong confusion arises regarding the order of the duels.

At the court of Agramante, after the response in favor of Mandricardo, lots are drawn to decide who should fight the next duel: Agramante is desperate because in any case he will lose a precious fighter between Ruggiero and Mandricardo; just as Doralice also despairs for her beloved. The clash between the two Saracen warriors begins: Mandricardo seems to have the better, but in the end it is Ruggiero who gives the opponent the fatal blow (Canto XXX). Mandricardo's death causes great affliction in Doralice, who has been in love with him.
