= Rodomonte =

Character in a book by Matteo Maria Boiardo

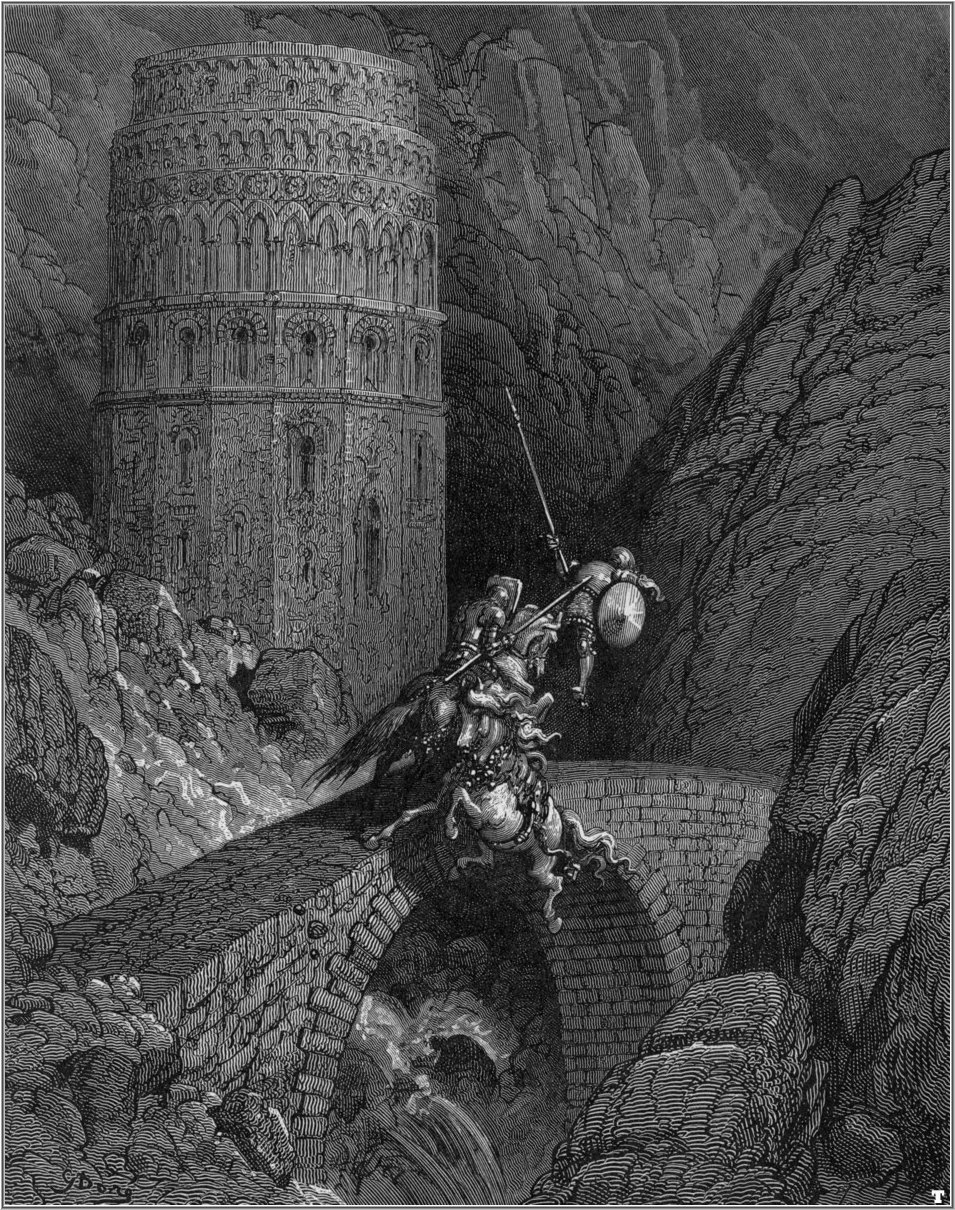
Rodomonte defending the bridge; illustration by Gustave Dore to Orlando furioso

Rodomonte (or Rodamonte) is a major character in the Italian romantic epic poems Orlando innamorato by Matteo Maria Boiardo and Orlando furioso by Ludovico Ariosto. He is the King of Sarza and Algiers and the leader of the Saracen army which besieges Charlemagne in Paris. He is in love with Doralice, Princess of Granada, but she elopes with his rival Mandricardo. He tries to seduce Isabella but she tricks him into killing her by mistake. In remorse, Rodomonte builds a bridge in her memory and forces all who cross it to pay tribute. When the "naked and mad" Orlando arrives at the bridge, it is Rodomonte, the pagan, who throws him into the river below. They both swim ashore, but Orlando who is naked and is unimpeded by heavy armor gets to the shore first. Finally, Rodomonte appears at the wedding of Bradamante and Ruggiero and accuses Ruggiero of treason for converting to Christianity and abandoning the Saracen cause. The two fight a duel and Rodomonte is killed.

Rodomonte's prowess is matched only by his arrogance and boasting. His name is the source of the expression rodomontade, meaning "boastful, bragging talk".

Rodomonte is also synonymous with strength and courage. The King of Spain gave the appellative "Rodomonte" to Luigi Gonzaga for his extraordinary strength.

Rodomonte first appears in Book 2, Canto i of Orlando innamorato. Boiardo was said to be so pleased at the invention of his name that he had the church bells rung in celebration.

Boiardo, in Book 2, Canto xiv, says Rodomonte is the son of Ulieno, and a descendant of the Biblical giant Nimrod, from whom he inherited his massive sword, which was too heavy for an ordinary man to lift.

== Sources ==
- Boiardo: Orlando innamorato ed. Giuseppe Anceschi (Garzanti,1978)
- Boiardo: Orlando innamorato translated by Charles Stanley Ross, (Parlor Press, 2004).
- Ariosto:Orlando Furioso, verse translation by Barbara Reynolds in two volumes (Penguin Classics, 1975). Part one (cantos 1–23) ISBN 0-14-044311-8; part two (cantos 24–46) ISBN 0-14-044310-X
- Ariosto: Orlando Furioso ed. Marcello Turchi (Garzanti, 1974)
- Ariosto: Orlando Furioso: A Selection ed. Pamela Waley (Manchester University Press, 1975)
