= Agrican =

Character the Italian chivalric poem Orlando Innamorato

Agrican (or Agricane, Agri Khan) is a king of Mongolia and emperor of Tartary who is a major character in the Italian chivalric poem Orlando Innamorato by Matteo Maria Boiardo.

His primary appearance in the story is when he besieges Angelica in the castle of Albracca in Cathay. She is defended by Count Orlando, who is in love with her and who changes the outcome of the battle in her favor.

At one point in the story, Agrican and Orlando directly face off. The two fight well into the evening but, because of darkness, are forced to suspend hostilities. So they rest in the peace of the starry night and converse on subjects suited to their dignity. But when Agrican discovers that Orlando is in love with Angelica, and because he does not want to renounce his own love, he leaps into the saddle to resume the fight.

The resulting clash, initially unfavorable to Orlando, ends with the death of the Tartar king who, during his death agony, asks to be baptized. He is heard and his conversion to Christianity is fulfilled before he closes his eyes forever. His body is then laid in arms, as in a funerary monument, near the water fountain from which he received baptism.

In the sequel epic, the Orlando furioso of Ludovico Ariosto, Agrican's son Mandricardo is the subject of several adventures.
