= Albracca =

Albracca (also spelled Albraca and Albrace) is a major city of Cathay in the Italian romantic epics Orlando innamorato by Matteo Maria Boiardo and Orlando furioso by Ludovico Ariosto. In the story it is the walled city and fortress where Angelica and the knights she has befriended make their stand when attacked by Agrican, emperor of Tartary.

Scholars have identified Albracca with Bukhara in modern Uzbekistan, in part because the siege of Albracca by Agrican described in the Orlando innamorato resembles the historic siege of Bukhara by Genghis Khan in 1220.

== Sources ==
- Boiardo: Orlando innamorato ed. Giuseppe Anceschi (Garzanti,1978)
- Boiardo: Orlando innamorato, verse translation by Charles Stanley Ross (Oxford University Press, 1995), Book I, Cantos 10-19 and Explanatory Notes, pp. 401-402. ISBN 0-19-282438-4
- Ariosto:Orlando Furioso, verse translation by Barbara Reynolds in two volumes (Penguin Classics, 1975). Part one, ISBN 0-14-044311-8; part two, ISBN 0-14-044310-X
- Ariosto: Orlando Furioso ed. Marcello Turchi (Garzanti, 1974)
