= Marfisa =

- Matter of France character
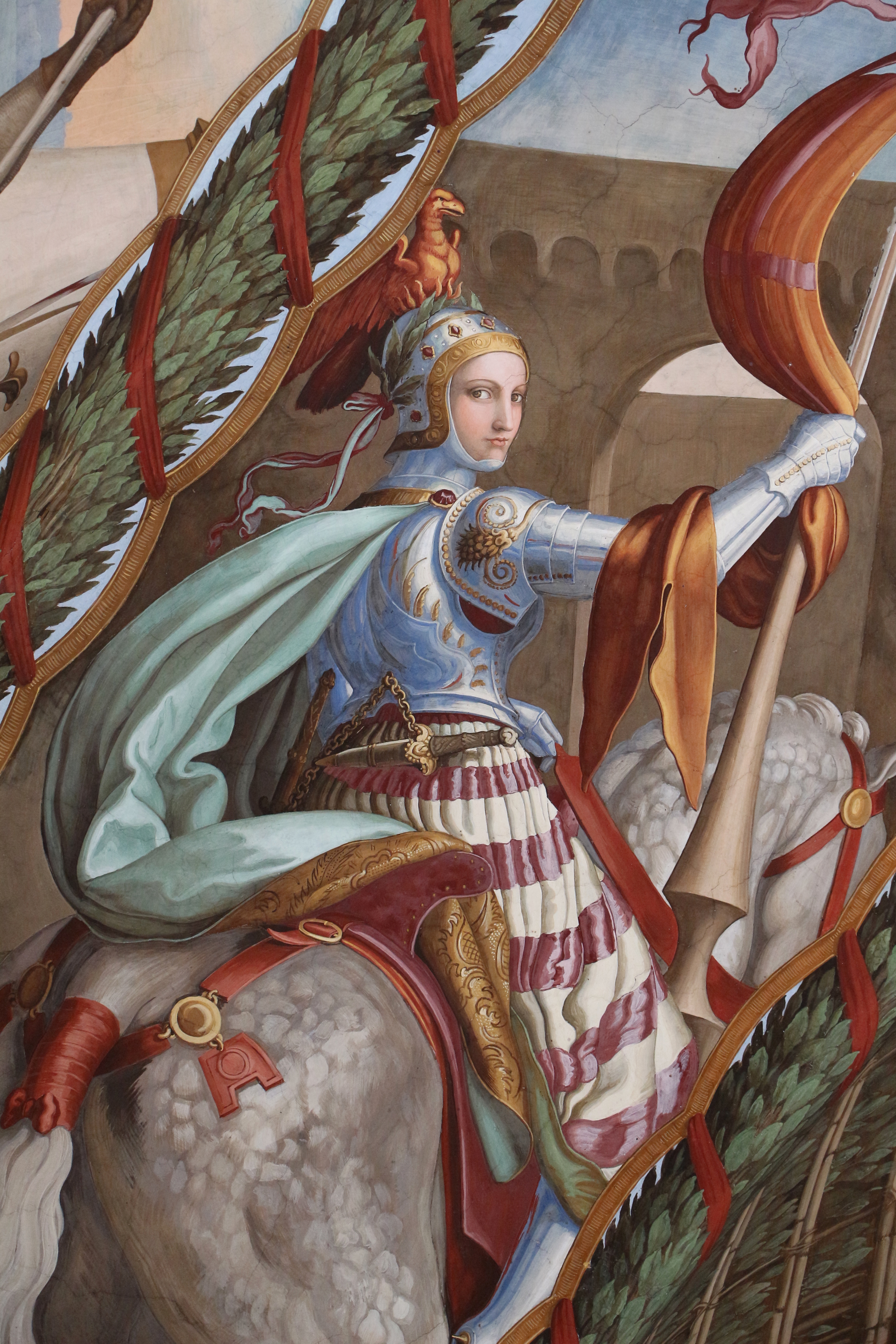
- Marfisa, detail from a fresco in the Villa Giustiniani Massimo (Julius Schnorr von Carolsfeld, 1822–27)
- First appearance: Orlando Innamorato

In-universe information
- Gender: Female
- Title: Queen of India
- Occupation: Warrioress
- Relatives: Ruggiero (brother)
- Religion: First Muslim, then Christian

Marfisa (also translated as "Marphisa") is a character in the Italian romantic epics Orlando innamorato by Matteo Maria Boiardo and Orlando Furioso by Ludovico Ariosto. She is the sister of Ruggiero but was separated from him in early childhood. She becomes queen of India and fights as a warrior for the Saracens, taking part in the siege of the fortress Albracca until her sword is stolen by Brunello. She falls in love with Ruggiero, unaware who he is until Atlantes reveals their background. Learning that her parents were Christian, she converts to the faith and joins the Emperor Charlemagne's army against the Saracens.

== Quotation ==
Marphisa raised her face with haughty cheer,
And answered him: "Thy judgment wanders far;
I will concede thy sentence would be clear,
Concluding I am thine by right of war,
If either were my lord or cavalier
Of those, by thee unhorsed in bloody jar:
Nor theirs am I, nor other's, but my own,
Who wins me, wins me from myself alone.

Orlando Furioso (tr. by William Stewart Rose,), 26, 79

== Legacy and influence ==
Italian playwright Carlo Gozzi composed his work La Marfisa Bizzara based on the eponymous character from Orlando furioso.

== Sources ==
- Boiardo: Orlando innamorato ed. Giuseppe Anceschi (Garzanti,1978)
- Ariosto:Orlando Furioso, verse translation by Barbara Reynolds in two volumes (Penguin Classics, 1975). Part one (cantos 1–23) ISBN 0-14-044311-8; part two (cantos 24–46) ISBN 0-14-044310-X
- Ariosto: Orlando Furioso ed. Marcello Turchi (Garzanti, 1974)

== See also ==
- List of woman warriors in legend and mythology
- Media related to Marfisa at Wikimedia Commons
