= La liberazione di Ruggiero =

Opera by Francesca Caccini

La liberazione di Ruggiero dall'isola d'Alcina
- comic opera by Francesca Caccini
- Librettist: Ferdinando Saracinelli
- Language: Italian
- Based on: Orlando Furioso by Ludovico Ariosto
- Premiere: 3 February 1625; Villa di Poggio Imperiale, Florence

La liberazione di Ruggiero dall'isola d'Alcina (En. "The Liberation of Ruggiero from the island of Alcina") is a comic opera in four scenes by Francesca Caccini, first performed 3 February 1625 at the Villa di Poggio Imperiale in Florence, with a libretto by Ferdinando Saracinelli based on Ludovico Ariosto's Orlando Furioso. It is the first opera written by a woman and was long considered to be the first Italian opera to be performed outside of Italy. (Note: A number of sources say it was the first Italian opera outside of Italy; Grove says it was not but does not give evidence or information on what actually is.) It was performed to celebrate the visit of Prince Władysław of Poland during Carnival 1625, and it was revived in Warsaw in 1628. The work was commissioned by her employer Regent Archduchess Maria Maddalena of Austria, wife of Cosimo II de' Medici. Ruggiero was printed under the protection of Maria Magdalena in 1625, only five years after the first printed opera in Italy. It is the only opera by Francesca Caccini to survive.

La liberazione di Ruggiero is written in the stile moderno, that is, the style of Claudio Monteverdi, although the work owes more perhaps to the work of Jacopo Peri. It uses the new stile recitativo, as well as canzonettas in the style of the concerto delle donne. The opera's orchestration calls for a lirone, and somewhat remarkably for the period the cast does not require a castrato. The piece is balanced towards higher voices, with six sopranos, two altos, seven tenors, and only one bass, as well as a trio of recorders. A compositional scheme is used within the work that associates flat keys with the feminine (the female protagonist Alcina and her attendants) and sharp keys with the masculine (the male protagonist Ruggiero and the other male roles). The sorceress Melissa, who also appears in male disguise, is presented in the key of C major. Alcina is an evil and sexual sorceress, whereas Melissa is good. Melissa fights to free Ruggiero from Alcina's spells.

The work has been recorded and has been revived a number of times, including in Cologne (1983), Ferrara (1987), Stockholm (1990), Minneapolis (1991), Düdingen (Switzerland), Regensburg, Neuburg an der Donau (Germany) (1999), Brighton Early Music Festival 2015 (recorded by BBC Radio 3), Marseille (France) (2017, recorded by Radio Classique), Boston Early Music Festival as Alcina (2018), Helsinki (2024) and Tallinn (2025).

== Recordings ==
- La liberazione di Ruggiero dall'isola d'Alcina directed by Wladyslaw Klosiewicz, with the Warsaw Chamber Opera and Musica Antique Collegium Varsoviense. B000FEW8LA
- La liberazione di Ruggiero dall'isola d'Alcina by Ensemble Renaissance on Sorabia Records
- La liberazione di Ruggiero dall'isola d'Alcina directed by Elena Sartori, with ensembles Allabastrina and La Pifarescha. Glossa 2016
- La liberazione di Ruggiero dall'isola d'Alcina (first recording of the complete opera including reconstructed instrumental dances) directed by Paul Van Nevel, with Huelgas Ensemble. Deutsche Harmonia Mundi 2018
