= Rodomontade =

Braggadocio

Rodomontade (/rɒdəmɒnˈtɑːdˌ-ˈteɪd/) is a mass noun meaning boastful talk or behavior. The term is a reference to Rodomonte, a character in the Italian Renaissance epic poem Orlando innamorato and its sequel Orlando furioso.

Henry Fielding in History of Tom Jones writes, “In fact, the good squire was a little too apt to indulge that kind of pleasantry which is generally called rhodomontade. . .”

== Examples of use ==
=== 17th century ===
A 17th-century example of the term exists in Don Tomazo by Thomas Dangerfield, albeit with a slight alteration of spelling. As the titular protagonist heads towards Cairo with a number of stolen treasures, he is informed by an acquaintance that:

. . . he could, in that heathenish city, command a thousand pound – which was at that time no rodomontado, in regard the jewels were worth above four times the value.

=== 18th century ===
In 1784, a tract of satirical but politically charged poetry of 94 pages was published in London, titled A Rodomontade of Politics: Or, a Series of Fables, with Notes Variorum; to be Continued Occasionally. The unnamed author describes literary rodomontade as "what is called a sketch or caracature in drawing", and proceeds to surreptitiously address his rodomontades to important political figures of the day, including Lord North, Edmund Burke, Richard Brinsley Sheridan, and William Pitt the Younger, whom were identified as being the subjects of these caracatures the very same year, in The English Review.

Jane Austen in Northanger Abbey has John Thorpe describing how he had been, "misled by the rhodomontade of his friend to believe his father a man of substance and credit,"

The German composer Georg Philipp Telemann composed a Suite in b minor (in German, h moll) for violin solo, strings and continuo (TWV 55: h4), which ends with a piece named "Rodomontade".

=== 19th century ===
A 19th-century example of the use of the term can be found in The Adventures of Captain Bonneville by Washington Irving. Irving used it to describe the behavior of "free trappers", fur trappers who worked freelance and adopted the manner, habits, and dress of the Native Americans. When free trappers visited Bonneville's camp, he welcomed them and ordered grog for everyone:

They [the free trappers] pronounced the captain the finest fellow in the world, and his men all bon garçons, jovial lads, and swore they would pass the day with them. They did so, and a day it was, of boast, and swagger, and rodomontade.

Edgar Allan Poe's 1838 novel “The Narrative of Arthur Gordon Pym of Nantucket” includes the following description of a shipwreck survivor who upon seeing a possible rescuing vessel “danced about the deck like a madman, uttering the most extravagant rodomontades, intermingled with howls and imprecations...”.

Another 19th-century example can be found in Thomas Carlyle's 1829 essay Signs of the Times:

We have more Mathematics than ever; but less Mathesis. Archimedes and Plato could not have read the Mécanique Céleste; but neither would the whole French Institute see aught in that saying, "God geometrises!" but a sentimental rodomontade.

=== 20th century ===
In the English translation of Natsume Soseki's novel, I am a Cat (1905-1906), when referring to the feline character Rickshaw Blacky: "Blacky, like all true braggarts, is somewhat weak in the head. As long as you purr and listen attentively, pretending to be impressed by his rhodomontade, he is a more or less manageable cat.”

"For surely, had Lucinda heard aught of the story of the duel, it would have been her first thing to speak of, not all this rhodomontade of silly necromancies." - from the novel An Affair of Dishonour (1910) by William De Morgan.

Rex Stout uses it in the second Nero Wolfe novel, "The League of Frightened Men" (1935), when Wolfe says, "If Mr. Chapin had ... restrained his impulse to rodomontade ..."

The word, with its alternative spelling (rhodomontade) is quoted in John Lukacs' book Five Days in London May 1940. While describing the tempestuous days of Churchill's first weeks in office, Lukacs quotes Alexander Cadogan, a bureaucrat with the Foreign Office, counselling Foreign Secretary Lord Halifax who was complaining that he could no longer work with Churchill. Cadogan said: Nonsense: his rhodomontades probably bore you as much as they do me, but don't do anything silly under the stress of that.

Julian Hawthorne employs the word twice in his posthumously published Memoirs, first to lambaste Amos Bronson Alcott, maintaining that he "couldn't write", and, "turned out a pretentious rodomontade of platitudes", and also to describe his 1864 initiation into the Harvard secret society The Dickey Club.

Hannah Arendt describes Adolf Eichmann's boasting as "sheer rodomontade" in Eichmann in Jerusalem:

"Bragging was the vice that was Eichmann's undoing. It was sheer rodomontade when he told his men during the last days of the war: 'I will jump into my grave laughing, because of the fact that I have the death of five million Jews...on my conscience gives me extraordinary satisfaction.' ... [For Eichmann to] claim the death of five million Jews, the approximate total of losses suffered from the combined efforts of all Nazi offices and authorities, was preposterous...."

The term was used in Desert Island Discs by the singer Morrissey when describing his own music.

Sir Anthony Parsons as UK Ambassador to the United Nations used the word during a speech on 22 May 1982 during a debate of the Security Council. He was describing the speeches of several other members including the USSR, Cuba and Panama during that day's debate on the Falklands War. He started the speech by saying:

"Obviously we expected other delegations to give bent to atrociously offensive, confused and ill-directed rodomontades against my country..."

William F. Buckley used the word in a May 29, 1995, column in the National Review entitled "What does Clinton have in mind? – Pres. Clinton's attack on conservative radio broadcasts"; Buckley, asking rhetorically whom Clinton was attacking, cited one theory:

The best those commentators could do who appeared on the MacNeil – Lehrer program was to quote an imprudent remark by Gordon Liddy, but what he said – that if any official came to his house to requisition his pistol, he'd better shoot straight – was more rodomontade than a call to arms or hatred.

William Makepeace Thackeray uses the word to describe a letter written by the eponymous hero of 'The Memoirs of Barry Lyndon, Esq.'.

The term was used by W. Somerset Maugham in 'Of Human Bondage' in Athelny's conversation, over tea, with his daughter's suitor.

'He (Athelny) addressed himself directly to his guest with a torrent of rhodomontade'.
Jane Austen in Northanger Abbey: 'mislead by the rodomontade of his friend to believe his father a man of substance and credit... (chapter 30)

Vladimir Nabokov criticized Fyodor Dostoevsky for his "gothic rodomontade".

Roy Jenkins in his biography of Churchill: '..., but also revealed a plain soldier's distaste for the publicity rodomontade which always attended Churchill, and maybe a touch of perverse jealousy too' (chapter 3, 1899–1935).

=== 21st century ===
By poet Michael Rosen about Boris Johnson on Twitter 11 September 2022: 'Dear Mogg, My speech was by far and away the best. Only I have the sense of rhetoric and rodomontade fitting for such a solemn occasion. Lo, how the paltry ranks of squalid, time-serving weasels will regret they've lost a giant and won a flea. Ry vita brevis arse longa. Boris'

== See also ==
- Braggadocio (rap)
