= Zerbino =

Fictional character in the Matter of France

Zerbino is a fictional character of the Matter of France. He appears in Orlando Furioso, the 16th-century Italian romantic epic by Ludovico Ariosto. He is the son of the King of Scotland, Duke of Ross, and brother of Ginevra. He takes part in a joust in Galicia, where Isabella, daughter of the King of Galicia, falls in love with him. In combat with the pagans outside Paris, he pursues Cloridano and Medoro. One of his Scottish knights stabs Medoro. Zerbino leaves Medoro for dead, but Medoro is later nursed back to health by Angelica. Zerbino is betrayed by Gabrina, and is about to be executed when he is rescued by Orlando and Isabella. After Orlando goes mad, Zerbino goes in search of him. Zerbino finds Orlando's arms and armour, which he has discarded in his madness. Mandricardo does battle with Zerbino and wins the sword Durendal from him.
