= Hippalectryon =

Hybrid creature in Ancient Greek folklore

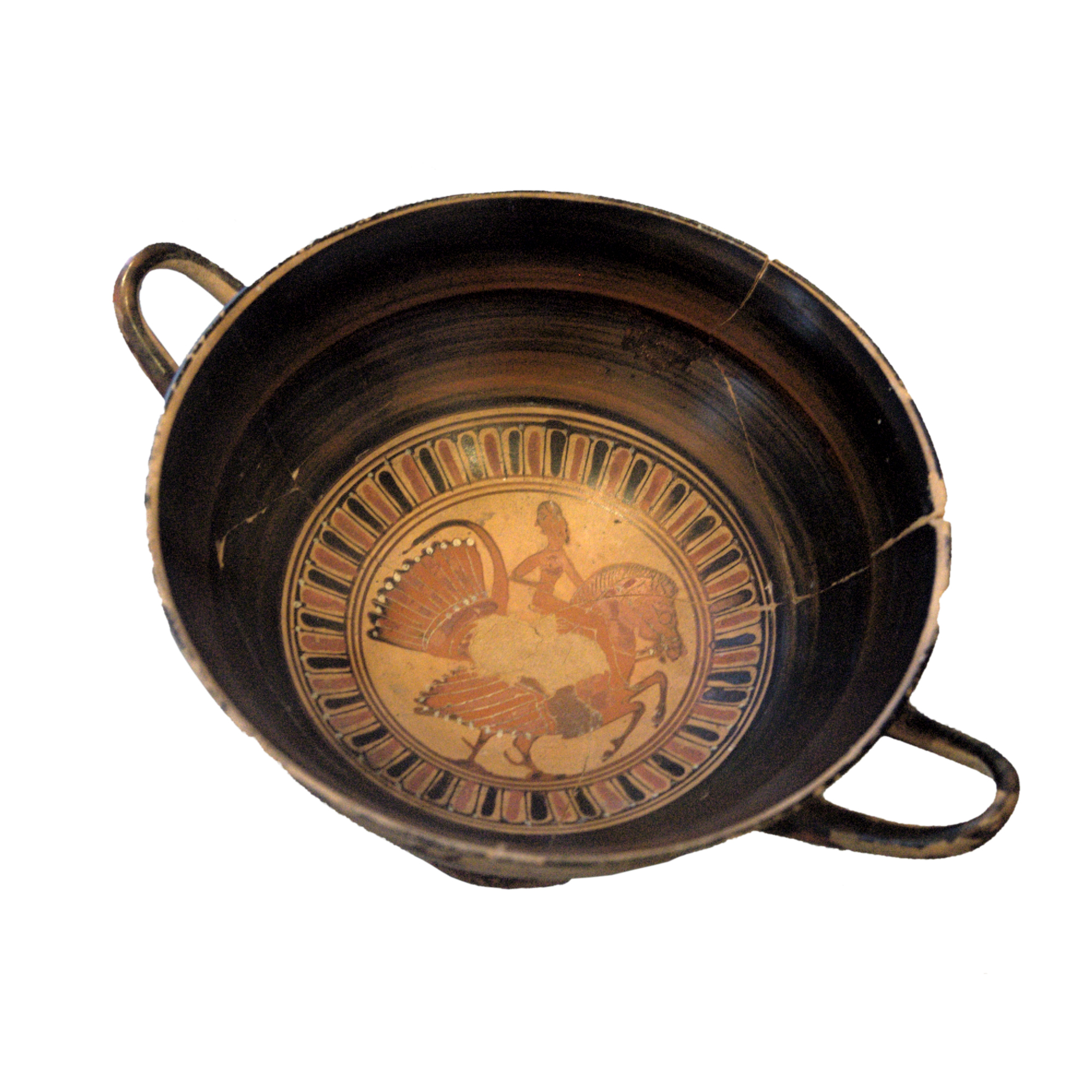
- Boy riding a hippalectryon, black-figure kylix from Attica, 540 to 530 BCE, Altes Museum (Berlin)

Creature information
- Other name(s): hippalektryon, cock-horse
- Grouping: Legendary creature
- Sub grouping: Hybrid creature
- Similar entities: hippogriff
- Folklore: Greek mythology

Origin
- Country: Greece

A hippalectryon, or hippalektryon (Greek: ἱππαλεκτρυών), is a type of fantastic hybrid creature of Ancient Greek folklore; half-horse (front) and half-rooster (hind), including the tail, wings and hind legs. Its colour varies between yellow and reddish. No myths related to it are currently known.

The oldest representation currently known dates back to the 9th century BCE, and the motif grows most common in the 6th century, notably in vase painting and sometimes as statues, often shown with a rider. It is also featured on some pieces of currency. A few literary works of the 5th century mention the beast, most notably Aeschylus and Aristophanes, who used it as one of his favourite insults.

The precise function of the Hippalectryon remains a mystery; as an apotropaic and prophylactic animal, it might have been dedicated to Poseidon and tasked to protect ships. Other studies interpret it as a grotesque beast to amuse children, or a simple fantastic decorative element without any specific function.

== Etymology ==
The term hippalectryon, also transcribed "hippalektryon", comes directly from Ancient Greek "ἱππαλεκτρυών", a compound word that comprises ἵππος (híppos, "horse"), and ἀλεκτρυών (alektryốn, "rooster"). The name is thus a plain description of the hybrid creature. The name seems to have been used for the first time by Aeschylus in Myrmidons; the comic usage made by Aristophanes suggests that by the end of the 5th Century, most of the inhabitants of Athens had never heard about the creature.

== Description ==

In The Birds, Aristophanes describes the hippalectryon as a yellow-feathered, awkward-looking creature. The appearance of the creature is consistent amongst the known artistic representations. It involves a horse front part, including the head, withers and the front legs; the hind part is that of a rooster, including the wings, tail and legs.

A text attributed to Hesychius of Alexandria mentions three different types of hippalectryons: a giant rooster; a giant vulture; and a creature close to griffins as painted on fabrics from Persia. Some confusion might have arisen, as some texts also refer to hippalectryons as plain horses, a coat-of-arms, or as sea monsters. Before Aeschylus, no specific term appears to refer to representations of hippalectryons.

=== Ceramic and sculpture ===
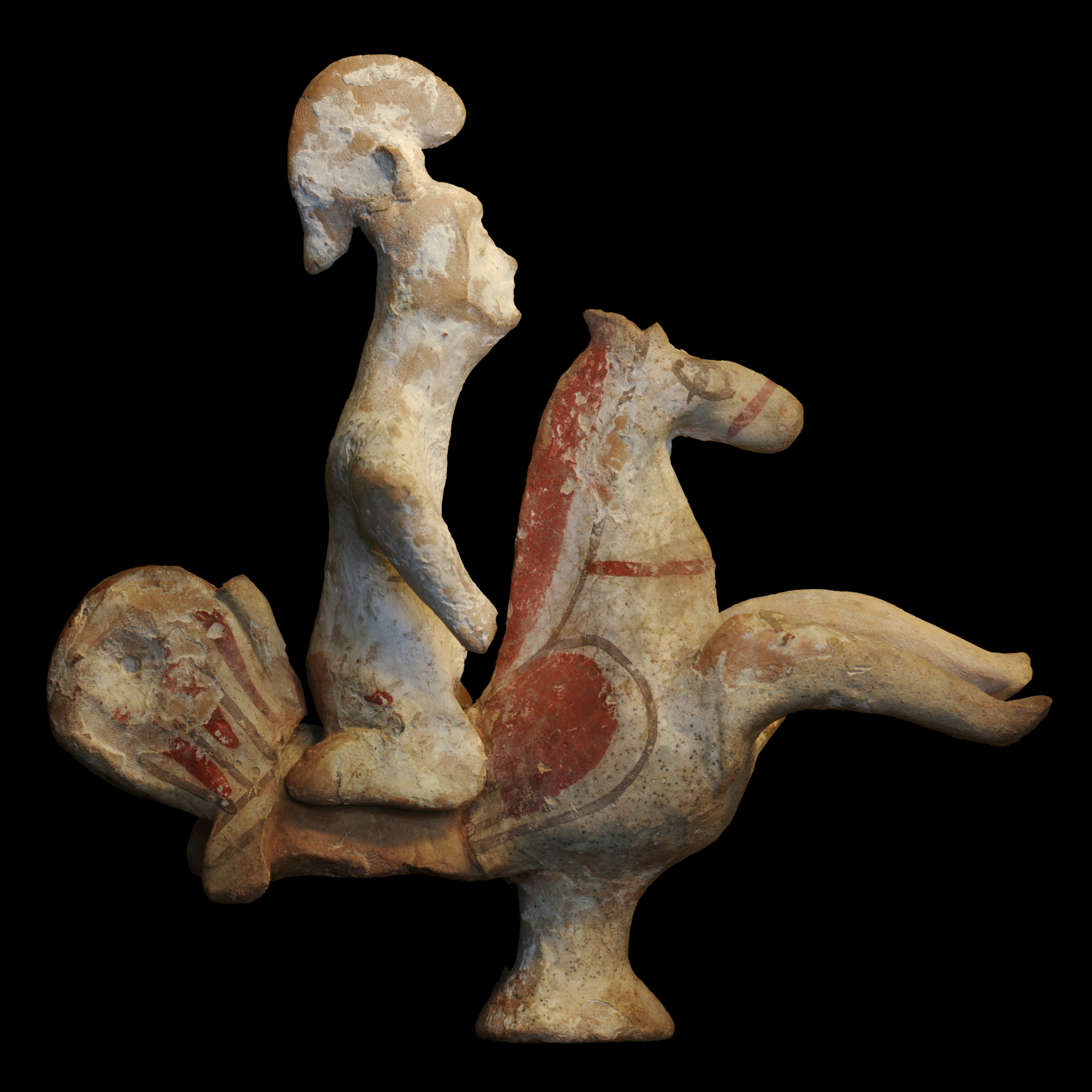
Warrior riding a hippalectryon, terracotta from Thebes, Greece, 500 to 470 BCE, Louvre museum

The oldest known representation of a hippalectryon is an askos from Knossos, dating back to the 9th century BCE.

Hippalectryons become a common theme from 575 to 480 BCE, often depicted with an unarmed rider, typically a young boy.

The motif might not be an ancient Greek invention: an analysis of Aristophanes' works suggests that it could have originated in the Middle East, and the costumes worn by the people featured on pottery with hippalectryons seem to be Asian, though this particular point is a matter of debate.

Hippalectryons are displayed almost exclusively on black-figure vases from Attica, and could constitute an alternative representation of Pegasus.

Hybrids are a popular and common theme in archaic Greek sculpture and vase painting. Most hybrids appear to have reached Greece from the East, although no early representation of a hippalectryon in Ancient Egyptian or Middle Eastern art has yet been found.

Hippalectryons have been found on engraved stones from the Late Period of ancient Egypt. Though they differ from 6th century Attic and Ionic representations, the horse head and the rooster legs and tail are featured.

=== Numismatics ===
Five coins featuring a hippalectryon, or possibly Pegasus, were found in 1868 in the Volterra treasure, amongst 65 very old pieces of currency

== Symbolism ==
According to a study of Aristophanes' The Frogs, hippalectryons were often painted on shields. A red-figure vase featuring Athena waving a shield sporting a hippalectryon has been found; the theme probably was credited with apotropaic and prophylactic virtues. Roosters are prophylactic as they are a symbol of solar power that routs demons with its singing at sunrise. Horses, especially winged horses, are a funerary symbol as they guide the souls of the dead. The grotesque and ugly hybrid supposedly induced laughter, thereby driving evil away.

The Hippalectryon described in Aeschylus' Myrmidons was probably sculpted to commemorate a naval high deed. In The Frogs, Aristophanes states that the motif was painted on galleys in ancient times, indicating that it could have been credited with magical powers to protect ships.

== Occurrences in Greek texts ==
Hippalectryons are not associated with any known myth or legend. As a consequence, they are scarcely mentioned by Greek authors.

Aeschylus is the first to mention them: in Myrmidons, he describes a ship featuring a "fire-coloured horse-chanticleer".

The figure of a hippalectryon is featured on Protesilaos' ship: one can see the laborious work performed on paintings (...)

Hippalectryon is one of Aristophanes' favourite insults. He uses it in Peace (421 BCE), The Birds (414) and in The Frogs (405), in which Dionysus and Euripides mock Aeschylus for mentioning it. He furthermore mentions that in his time (end of the 5th century BCE), most inhabitants of Athens had never heard of hippalectryons.

Indeed I grow a great deal fatter passing the summer in this way than in watching a cursed captain with his three plumes and his military cloak of a startling crimson (he calls it true Sardian purple), which he takes care to dye himself with Cyzicus saffron in a battle; then he is the first to run away, shaking his plumes like a great yellow prancing cock.
Peace

Is it not the most priceless gift of all, to be winged? Look at Diitrephes!(18) His wings were only wicker-work ones, and yet he got himself chosen Phylarch and then Hipparch; from being nobody, he has risen to be famous; 'tis now the finest gilded cock of his tribe.
The Birds

AESCH. It was a sign, you stupid dolt, engraved the ships upon.

DIO. Eryxis I supposed it was, Philoxenus's son.

EUR. Now really should a cock be brought into a tragic play?

AESCH. You enemy of gods and men, what was your practice, pray?

EUR. No cock-horse in my plays, by Zeus, no goat-stag there you'll see, such figures as are blazoned forth in Median tapestry.

The Frogs

== In popular culture ==
- Hippalectryons are seldom mentioned in modern works. There might be an occurrence in Ride a cock horse to Banbury Cross, a nursery rhyme published in Mother Goose English translation, published in 1729:

Roundelay :

Ride a cock-horse
To Banbury cross
To see an old woman
Ride on a white horse;
Rings on her fingers,
Bells on her toes,
She shall have music

Wherever she goes.

- Hippalektryons appear in the Percy Jackson & the Olympians series, in the fourth book, The Battle of the Labyrinth. They are thought to be extinct, but there are some at Geryon's Ranch.
- Hippalektryons also feature in the third book of the Thrones and Bones trilogy, Skyborn, by Lou Anders. Karn and Asterius, the minotaur prince, use them to escape from the Thican soldiers at Caldera.

== Notes and references ==
=== Bibliography ===
- (in French) Swets and Zitlinger, « Annales de la Faculté des Lettres de Bordeaux et des Universités du Midi, quatrième série commune aux Universités d'Aix, Bordeaux, Montpellier, Toulouse », in Revue des études anciennes, t. 6, 1904.
- W. Geoffrey Arnott, Birds in the ancient world from A to Z, Routledge, 2007 ISBN 978-0-415-23851-9.
- Juan Eduardo Cirlot, Jack Sage et Herbert Read, A dictionary of symbols, Routledge, 1993 ISBN 978-0-415-03649-8.
