= Il Ruggiero =

Opera by Johann Adolph Hasse

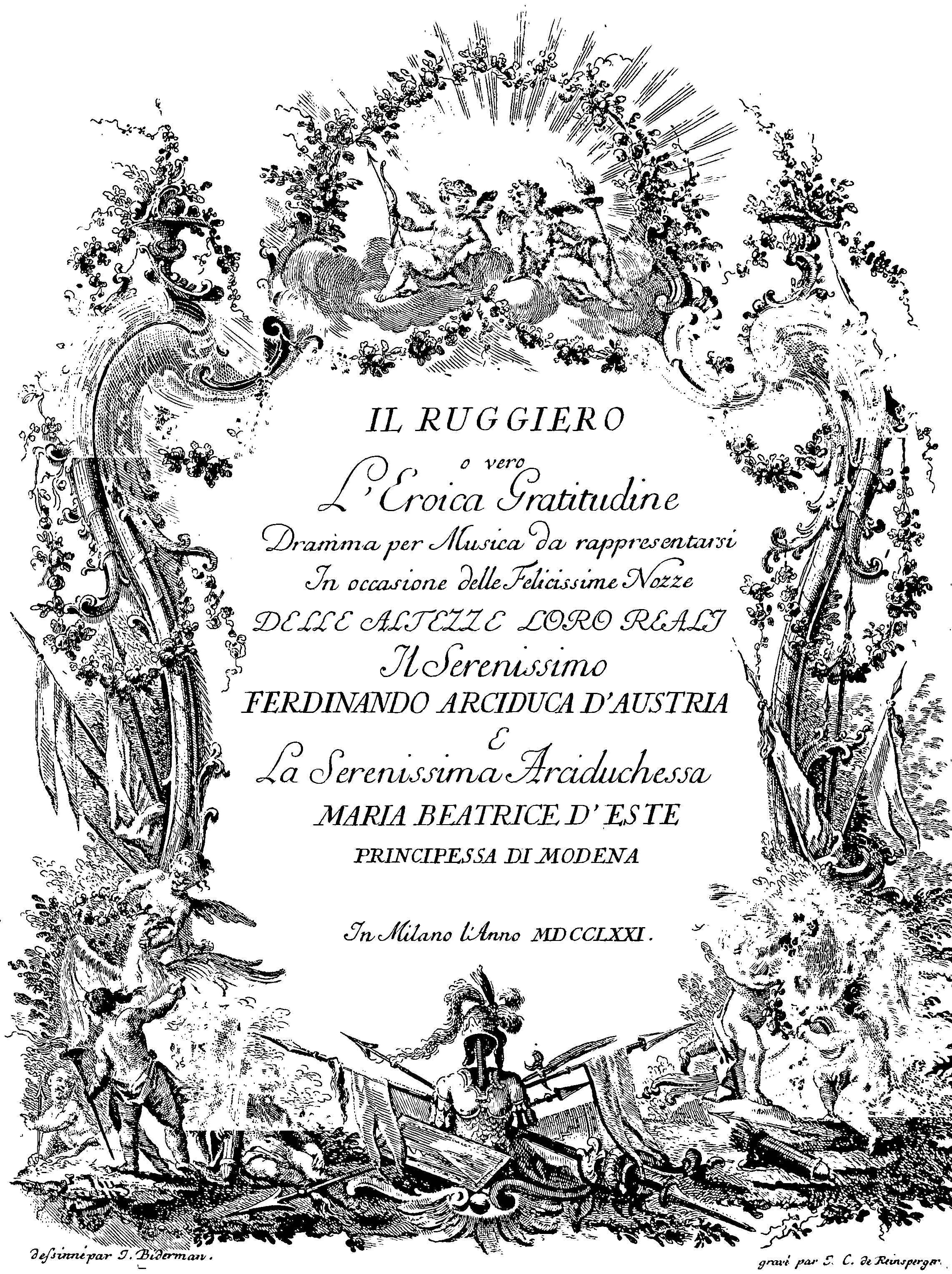
Il Ruggiero, titlepage of the libretto, Milan 1771

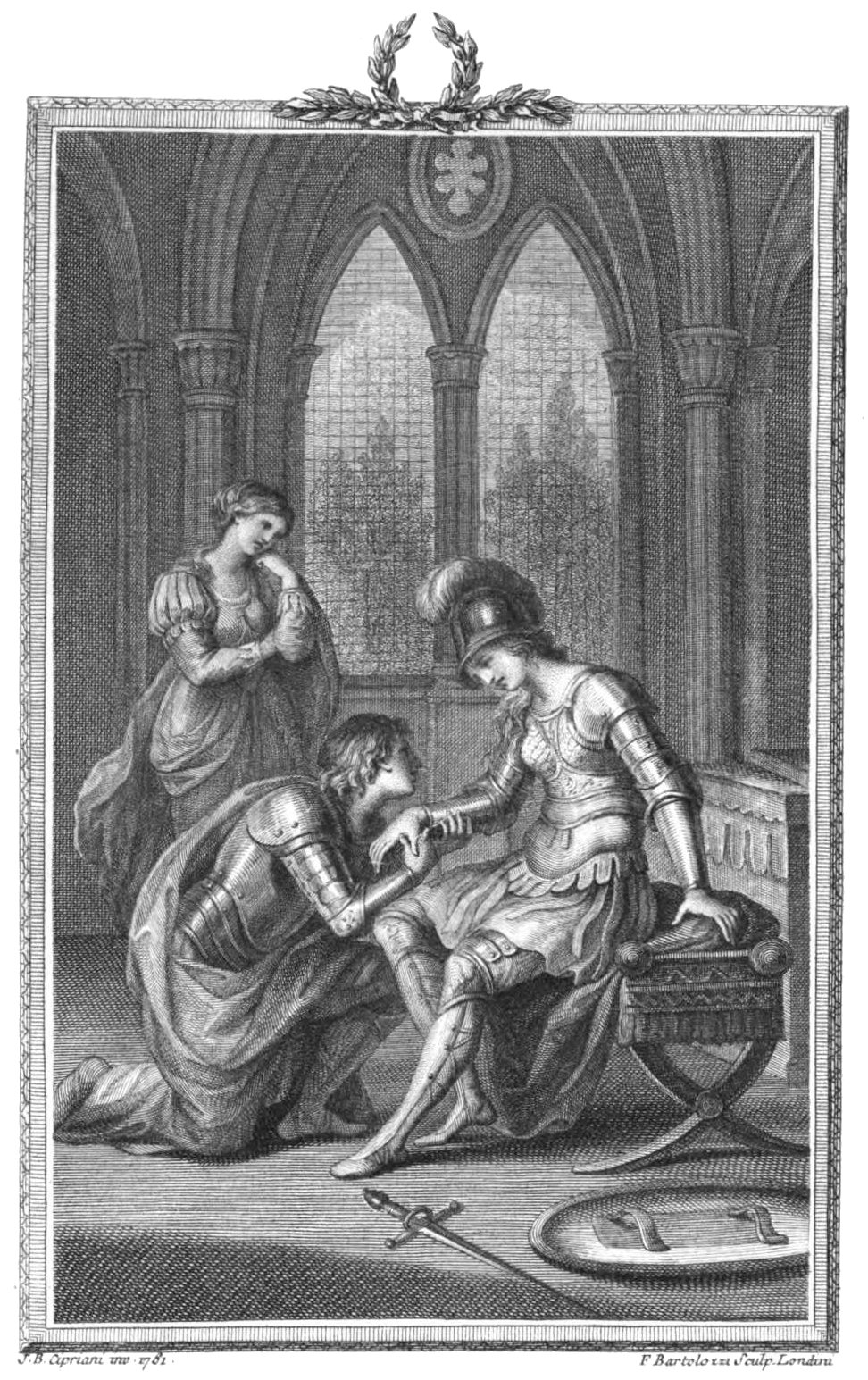
Scene from act 3, scene 4. Ruggiero: "Ah sì, vinci te stessa: a'piedi tuoi / L'implora il tuo Ruggier"

Il Ruggiero (full name: Il Ruggiero ovvero L'eroica gratitudine) is an opera in three acts composed by Johann Adolph Hasse to a libretto by Pietro Metastasio. It was first staged on 16 October 1771 for the wedding of Archduke Ferdinand Karl with Maria Beatrice d'Este in the Teatro Regio Ducale, Milan. It was both Metastasio's last libretto and Hasse's last opera, as well as the thirty-second Metastasio libretto Hasse had set to music.

== Action ==
The characters and plot are drawn from the last three songs (44–46) in Orlando Furioso by Ludovico Ariosto, published in 1516. The hero Ruggiero loves the warrior-woman Bradamante. When Ruggiero goes missing, Bradamante declares she will marry only the man who can defeat her in single combat. Ruggiero returns together with Leone, to whom he owes his life. Leone falls in love with Bradamante and persuades Ruggiero to go into combat with her disguised as him.

== Roles ==
- Carlo Magno (Charlemagne),(tenor)
- Bradamante, famous woman warrior, lover of Ruggiero (soprano)
- Ruggiero, descendant of Hector, famous hero, lover of Bradamante (soprano)
- Leone, son and heir of the Byzantine emperor Costantino (soprano)
- Clotilde, Frankish princess, lover of Leone (soprano)
- Ottone, Frankish Knight, confidant of Bradamante and Ruggiero (tenor)

=== Act 1 ===
Gallery in Clotilde's apartment

Ruggiero, Bradamante's lover, has gone to war to defend Bulgaria against the Greeks and has been missing for months. Bradamante tells Clotilde she is going to look for him, although Clotilde advises her not to. Ottone reports the arrival in Paris of the Greek emperor Leone, who wishes to woo Bradamante, although Clotilde has long been in love with Leone herself.

Gallery in Leone's apartment

Ottone has found Ruggiero. He has been staying with the Greeks incognito under the assumed name Erminio. After the battle against the Greeks he was taken prisoner but was freed by Leone, who admired his bravery. Owing Leone his life, he is honour-bound to support his bid for Leone's hand. Leone asks Ruggiero, whom he still thinks is Erminio, whether it is true that Bradamante is in love with Ruggiero. Ruggiero confirms this is true. He secretly suffers from the conflict between his friendship with Leone and his love for Bradamante.

The imperial apartment

Bradamante asks Carlo Magno for help. She does not want to be married to a man who is inferior to her in fighting skills. They therefore decide that anyone who seeks her hand must stand against her in combat for a specified time.

=== Act 2 ===
The royal gardens

Ottone announces to Carlo that Leone has arrived and is ready to fight Bradamante. Carlo fears that he will be defeated, which would damage his negotiations with the Greeks. After Carlo leaves, Bradamante appears and Leone declares his love for her. Clotilde reports to Bradamante that Ruggiero has reappeared and Ottone has already spoken to him. Ruggiero now arrives, tells of his rescue by Leone and asks Bradamante to accept him as her husband. Bradamante is horrified and leaves angrily. Leone returns; knowing he has no chance to defeat Bradamante and asks Ruggiero to fight in his place in disguise.

=== Act 3 ===
Room in Bradamante's apartment

The combat is over. Clotilde assumes that Leone has been defeated and is already mourning her former lover. Ottone arrives and reports that unexpectedly, Leone has won by continuing to fight until the allotted time expired. Clotilde regrets that Bradamante and Ruggiero are now separated forever. She sends Ottone to Ruggiero to comfort him. Bradamante arrives, ashamed at her defeat, and furiously throws her weapons away. She sends Clotilde away to be alone. However, Ruggiero comes to her and assures her of his love. He wants to reconcile with her and then die. However, she feels betrayed by him and refuses to listen. They are interrupted by Clotilde, who tells Bradamante that the emperor wants to speak to them. After she leaves, Ruggiero tells Clotilde how desperate he is and also leaves. Leone joins Clotilde in search of Bradamante. She tells him about Erminio's true identity and emphasises the sacrifice he has made. Leone admires Ruggiero's nobility.

Illuminated gallery

Clotilde complains to Ottone of her suffering because of her lost love for Leone. Emperor Carlo and Bradamante arrive, followed by Leone and Ruggiero. Leone reveals that Ruggiero fought in his place, and asks forgiveness for his mistakes – before he fell in love with Bradamante, he had already promised his heart to Clotilde. The opera concludes with Emperor Carlo blessing the union of the two couples, Ruggiero and Bradamante, Clotilde and Leone.

== Background ==
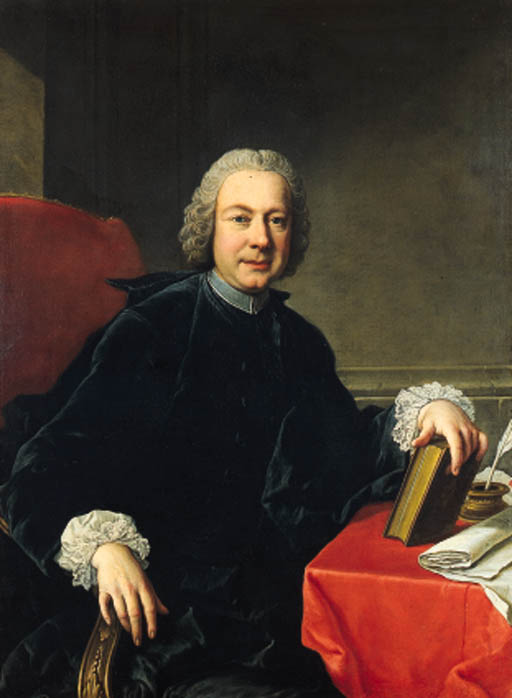
Metastasio by Batoni

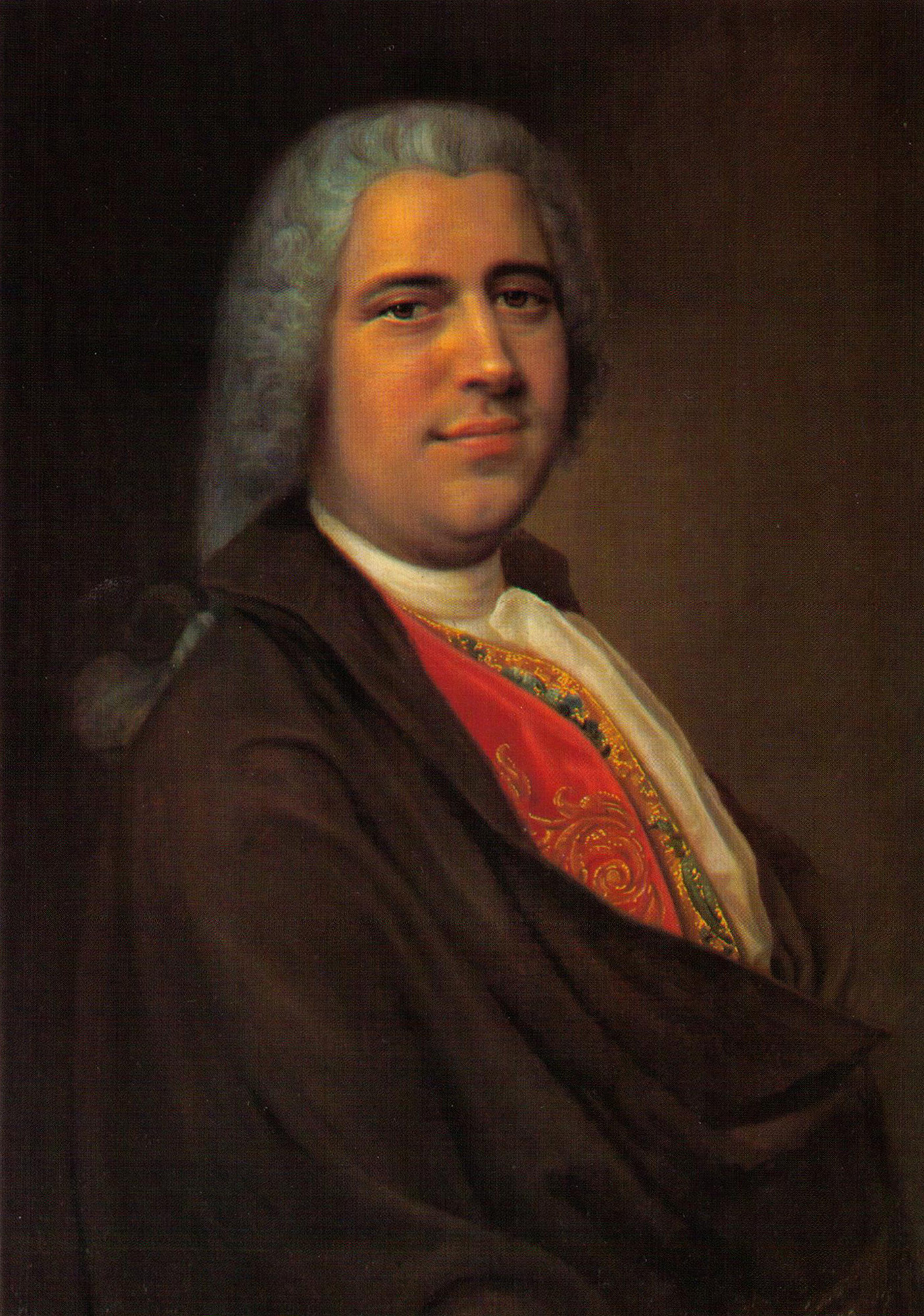
Johann Adolph Hasse by Balthasar Denner

Metastasio had previously written a first version of the libretto at the request of Empress Maria Theresa for the marriage of Marie Antoinette with the future Louis XVI on May 16, 1770. It was this wedding which inspired the theme of the opera, with its setting in Paris and its focus on courtly love. Metastasio did not feel able to discharge this commission well, and only reluctantly agreed to do so out of a sense of duty to the empress. After a while he stopped working on the text and the court had to abandon the planned performance. Nevertheless, Maria Theresa insisted that he complete the libretto. The following year, at the wedding of her son Ferdinand to Maria Beatrice d'Este, she ordered Metastasio to revise it for performance on October 16, 1771 in Milan.

Her favorite composer Hasse, who had been associated with the imperial court for over thirty years, was commissioned to compose the music. Hasse was 71 years old and plagued by gout, so was hardly able to write. He had also abandoned writing theatre music three years before, to devote the rest of his life to church music. He was aware that musical tastes had changed and that his style was no longer what people wanted to hear. Nevertheless, he accepted the commission.

== Critical reception ==
Metastasio's libretto did not prove a success. The subject of knightly combat was not in keeping with the taste of the time and the plot seemed somewhat old-fashioned with its similarities to his earlier libretti L'Olimpiade and Nitteti. Hasse's setting relied on extensive recitatives, which may not have helped, and his use of an expanded wind section and timpani to create a festive quality in the music was to no avail. Both for Metastasio and for Hasse Ruggiero was a disappointing end to their life's work.

As part of the extensive wedding celebrations, Mozart's pastoral opera Ascanio in Alba was also being performed. The main roles in both works were taken by the soprano Antonia Maria Girelli Aguilar, the castrato Giovanni Manzuoli and the tenor Giuseppe Tibaldi. They were all among the greatest vocal virtuosi of their time, but were past their best. The stage sets were created by the brothers Bernardino, Fabrizio and Giovanni Antonio Galliari. Due to illness of Girelli, the opera was stopped after the fourth performance.

The world premiere of Mozart's took place the day after the premiere of Il Ruggiero, on October 17, 1771, and it was a great success. Hasse is said to have remarked: "Questo ragazzo ci farà dimenticar tutti" ("This boy will make us all forgotten.") The authenticity of this saying is questioned, but it is certain that Hasse admitted the failure of his opera, as can be seen from a letter dated October 30: "Il mio Ruggiero ebbe la prima sera tutte quelle fatalità che possono unirvi per far torto ad una produzione teatrale." (On its first night, my Ruggiero suffered every misfortune that could combine to make a theater production fail.) After this failure Maria Theresa was kind to Hasse. In December she invited him to an audience with his daughter and gave him a generous gift.

On January 20, 1772, there was a follow-up performance at the Teatro San Carlo in Naples, for which Hasse slightly revised the score. The main difference was that the final scene was replaced by a ballet.

== Other settings ==
The only other settings of Metastasio's libretto were by Antonio Gandini in 1820 and a version produced in Naples in 1838 with music by Samuel Holmes.
