= Orlando Pursuing the Fata Morgana =

Painting by George Frederic Watts

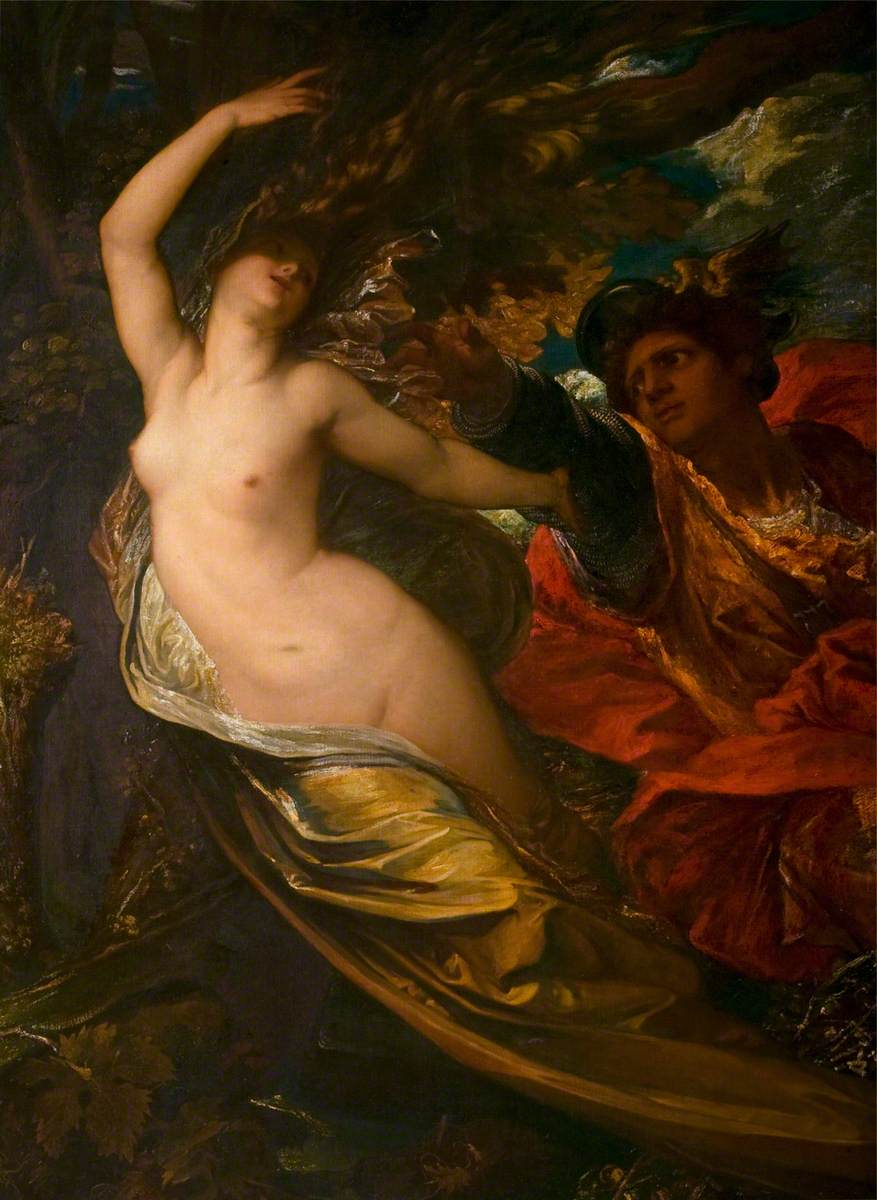
- Artist: George Frederic Watts
- Year: 1846-48
- Type: Oil on canvas, history painting
- Dimensions: 165 cm × 120 cm (65 in × 47 in)
- Location: Museum and Art Gallery; Leicester

Orlando Pursuing the Fata Morgana is an 1848 history painting by the British artist George Frederic Watts. It represents a scene from the epic poem Orlando Innamorato by the Italian Renaissance writer Matteo Maria Boiardo. It was begun in 1846 when Watts was visiting Italy and completed on his return to London. The painting was displayed at the annual exhibition of the British Institution in Pall Mall. Today it is in the collection of the Leicester Museum and Art Gallery, having been given by the artist in 1888.

== Bibliography ==
- Gaja, Katherine. G. F. Watts in Italy: A Portrait of the Artist as a Young Man. Olschki, 1995.
- Herrmann, Luke. Nineteenth Century British Painting. Charles de la Mare, 2000.
