= Gano =

Gano is a name of French origin. It is an alternative version of the names Ganeau, Ganot, or Guéneau which derive from the Germanic word wan, meaning hope. The name came to America via the Huguenots.

== People with the surname ==
- Eugene Gano Hay (1853–1933), American politician
- Francis Gano Benedict (1870–1957), American chemist and nutritionist
- Glen Gano (1892–1973), American cinematographer and actor
- Gordon Gano (born 1963), American musician
- Graham Gano (born 1987), American football player
- John Gano (1727–1804), American pastor
- Richard Montgomery Gano (1830–1913), American Protestant minister and physician, Confederate Army officer
- Roy Alexander Gano (1902–1971), United States Navy admiral
- Stephen Gano (1762–1828), American pastor and physician
- Zinho Gano (born 1993), Belgian footballer

== People with the given name ==
- Gano Chittenden (1897–1980), American art director
- Gano Dunn (1870–1953), American businessman and electrical engineer

== Locations ==
- Gano, Kansas, an unincorporated community in Finney County, Kansas, USA
- Gano, Ohio, an unincorporated community in Butler County, Ohio, USA

== Other ==
- Gano Forum, a political party in Bangladesh
