= Melissa (sorceress) =

Fictional character

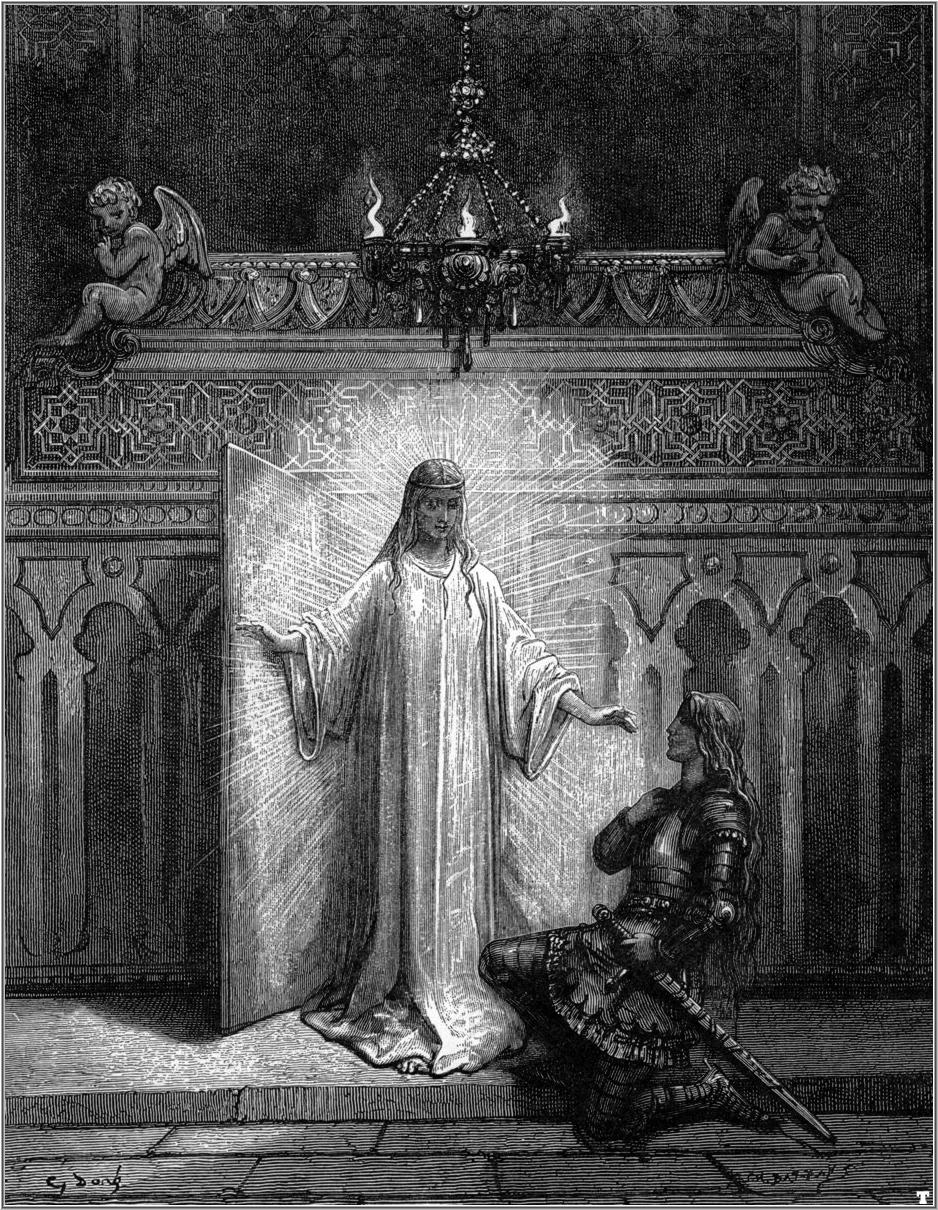
Melissa and Bradamante, in Gustave Doré's illustration to Orlando Furioso

Melissa is a fictional good sorceress in the Matter of France. She is said to have been an apprentice of Merlin and guards his tomb, though she does not appear in older stories about him. She rescues Astolfo from Alcina and returns him to normal.

In Orlando Furioso, she is instrumental in the love affair of Ruggiero and Bradamante, who she is determined will one day marry. Whenever their relationship is threatened, she brings them back together. Melissa conjures Ruggiero and Bradamante's descendants and foretells their futures. When Ruggiero has fallen victim to the enchantments of Alcina, she comes to his rescue by restoring his memory of his love for Bradamante, and releasing him from the spell which held him captive on Alcina's Isle. Later, Ruggiero loses a combat to determine who shall win the hand of Bradamante; despondent, he goes into the woods to starve himself to death. Melissa hears of his plight and reveals the truth to him: that he had lost in combat not to his rival, but to Bradamante herself; therefore, there is no reason their wedding cannot proceed.

== Poetry ==
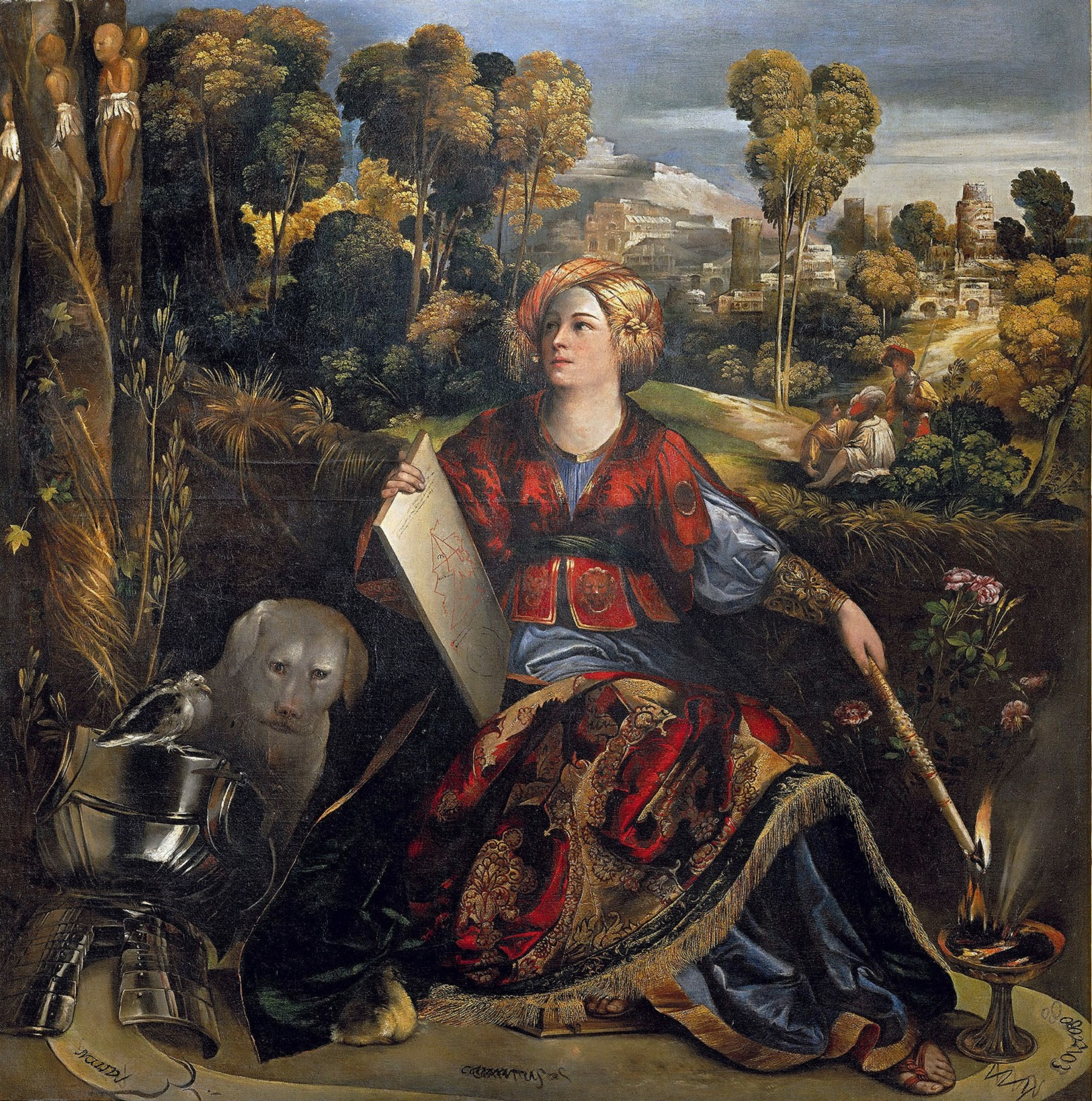
Melissa by Dosso Dossi

The 16th-century Italian poet Ludovico Ariosto used the name "Melissa" for a good fairy (the good sorceress and prophetess who lived in Merlin's cave) in his poem Orlando Furioso. The following is an ode to Melissa's birthday by Thomas Blacklock, a Scottish poet from the late 18th century.

=== Ode, on Melissa's Birth Day ===
Ye nymphs and swains, whom love inspires
With all his pure and faithful fires,
Hither with joyful steps repair;
You who his tenderest transports share
For lo ! in beauty's fairest pride,
Summer expands her heart so wide;
The Sun no more in clouds inshrin'd,
Darts all his glories unconfin'd;
The feather'd choir from every spray
Salute Melissa's natal day.

Hither ye nymphs and shepherds haste,
Each with a flow'ry chaplet grac'd,
With transport while the shades resound,
And Nature spreads her charms around;
While ev'ry breeze exhales perfumes,
And Bion his mute pipe resumes;
With Bion long disus'd to play,
Salute Melissa's natal day.

For Bion long deplor'd his pain
Thro' woods and devious wilds in vain;
At last impell'd by deep despair,
The swain proferr'd his ardent pray'r;
His ardent pray'r Melissa heard,
And every latent sorrow cheer'd,
His days with social rapture blest,
And sooth'd each anxious care to rest.
Tune, shepherds, tune the festive lay,
And hail Melissa's natal day.

With Nature's incense to the skies
Let all your fervid wishes rise,
That Heav'n and Earth may join to shed
Their choicest blessings on her head;
That years protracted, as they flow,
May pleasures more sublime bestow;
While by succeeding years surpast,
The happiest still may be the last;
And thus each circling Sun display,
A more auspicious natal day.
