= Ruggiero (character) =

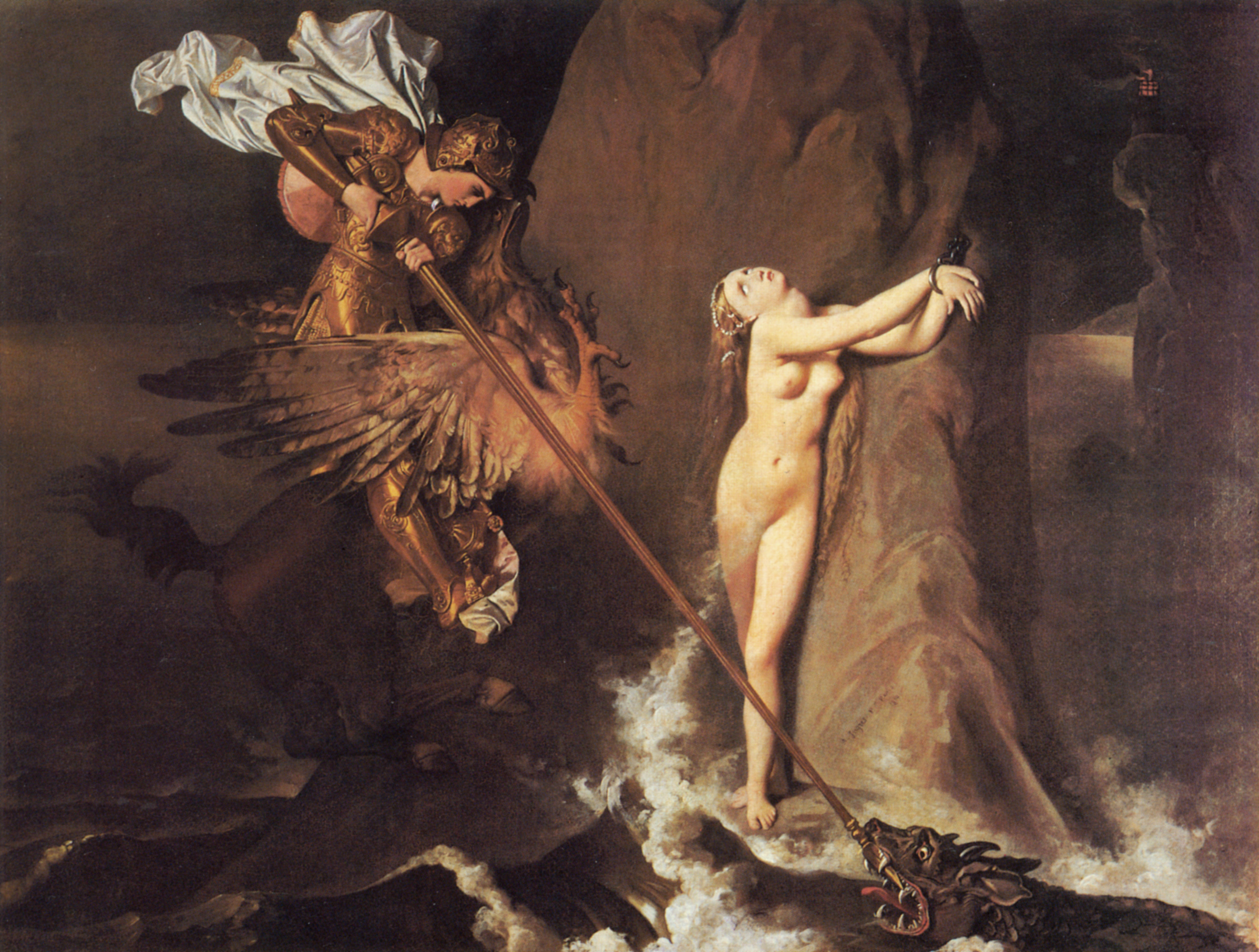
- Ruggiero Rescuing Angelica by Jean-Auguste-Dominique Ingres
- First appearance: Orlando Innamorato

In-universe information
- Gender: Male
- Occupation: Knight
- Spouse: Bradamante
- Relatives: Marfisa (sister), Ruggiero II (father), Gallacia (mother), Atlantes (foster parent)
- Religion: Islam, then Christianity
- Nationality: Saracen

Ruggiero (often translated Rogero in English) is a leading character in the Italian romantic epics Orlando Innamorato by Matteo Maria Boiardo and Orlando Furioso by Ludovico Ariosto. Ruggiero had originally appeared in the twelfth-century French epic Aspremont, reworked by Andrea da Barberino as the chivalric romance Aspramonte. In Boiardo and Ariosto's works, he is supposed to be the ancestor of Boiardo and Ariosto's patrons, the Este family of Ferrara, and he plays a major role in the two poems.

== Story ==
He is the son of a Christian knight (Ruggiero II of Reggio Calabria, a descendant of Astyanax, son of Hector) and a Saracen lady (Galaciella, daughter of Agolant, king of Africa). When Ruggiero's father is betrayed and murdered, his mother escapes to the sea by boat, lands on the shores of Libya and dies after giving birth to twins. Ruggiero is raised since infancy by the wizard Atlante in Africa as a Saracen warrior (in Ariosto, Marfisa is Ruggiero's twin sister).

Ruggiero is the subject of two possible prophecies. His first possible fate is to convert to Christianity, marry Bradamante and sire a line of heroes that lead to the noble house of Este in Italy, but will be betrayed and killed soon after his marriage. His second possible fate is to remain a Saracen and be the cause of the downfall of the Frankish Empire. Atlante is fiercely protective of Ruggiero and keeps him hidden in an invisible castle on the top of Mount Carena in Africa.

King Agramante of Africa proposes invading France and gathers his war council together at his palace in Biserta. The king from Garamanta rose and prophesied that such an invasion was doomed unless they had the youth Ruggiero on their side. He was the key to their victory. (Garamanta did not know of the other possible prophecy regarding Ruggiero.) Agramante sent search parties looking for Ruggiero, but could not find him due to Atlante's sorcery.

The thief Brunello was sent east to the kingdom of Cathay to steal a magic ring from Angelica that would remove all enchantments from the wearer's eyes. Once Brunello returned with the stolen ring, Agramante found the hidden castle. A tournament was held at the base of Mount Carena and Ruggiero was lured outside.

After Ruggiero was given a sword, armor, and a horse by Brunello, he entered a melee and became the tournament champion. Later he was knighted by Agramante and joined the Saracen army in its invasion of Europe, against Atlante's wishes.

Agramante's army joins Rodomonte's forces who are fighting the Franks at the border war at Montalbano (Montauban). Ruggiero shows his military prowess in the battle and has duels with Orlando and Rinaldo. Both duels are interrupted.

After the battle is over for the day, Ruggiero meets and falls in love with the female Christian knight Bradamante (sister to Rinaldo). She is attacked and wounded by Saracen patrols and Ruggiero defends her honor. During the fight Bradamante and Ruggiero are separated for the first of many times.

Atlante then takes Ruggiero hostage and holds him in an enchanted castle with lords and ladies to keep him company. Bradamante rescues Ruggiero, but he is soon tricked into climbing on the back of a hippogriff.

The hippogriff flies him to an island east of India and he is held captive there by the enchantress Alcina on her magic island. Ruggiero forgets about his love for Bradamante and falls for the charms of Alcina. He is there until he is helped by the good sorceress Melissa.

He rescues the princess Angelica, who has been offered as a sacrifice to an orca. Finally, he is baptised into Christianity, and marries Bradamante. Rodomonte appears at the wedding feast and accuses Ruggiero of betraying the Saracen cause. The two knights duel, ending in Rodomonte's death.

== Depictions ==
=== Opera ===
Ruggiero appears in several operas, including La liberazione di Ruggiero (1625) by Francesca Caccini, Alcina (1735) by Handel and is the main character in Johann Adolph Hasse’s Il Ruggiero.

=== Movie ===
Ruggiero is played by Ron Moss in the Italian film Paladini-storia d'armi e d'amori ("Paladins—the story of love and arms", a.k.a. "Hearts and Armour").

== Sources ==
- Boiardo: Orlando innamorato ed. Giuseppe Anceschi (Garzanti,1978)
- Boiardo:Orlando innamorato translated by Charles Stanley Ross, Parlor Press, 2004. ISBN 1-932559-01-9
- Ariosto:Orlando Furioso, verse translation by Barbara Reynolds in two volumes (Penguin Classics, 1975). Part one (cantos 1–23) ISBN 0-14-044311-8; part two (cantos 24–46) ISBN 0-14-044310-X
- Orlando Furioso, prose translation by Guido Waldman (Oxford, 1999). ISBN 0-19-283677-3.
- Ariosto: Orlando Furioso ed. Marcello Turchi (Garzanti, 1974)
- Ariosto: Orlando Furioso: A Selection ed. Pamela Waley (Manchester University Press, 1975)
