= Bradamante =

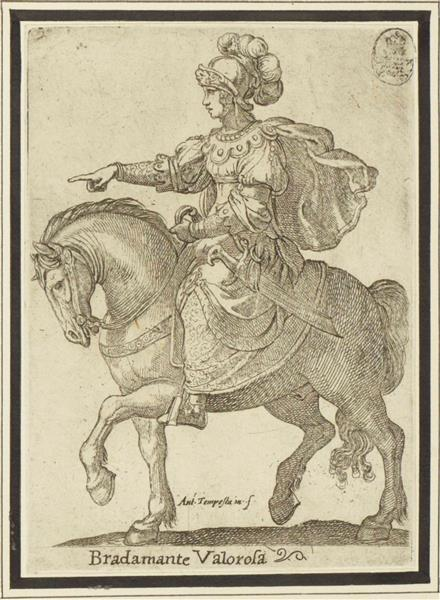
- Bradamante valorosa (1597) by Antonio Tempesta
- First appearance: Orlando Innamorato

In-universe information
- Gender: Female
- Occupation: Knight
- Spouse: Ruggiero
- Relatives: Rinaldo (brother); Alardo (brother); Ricciardetto (brother); Guidon (brother); Duke Amon (father); Beatrice (mother)
- Religion: Christianity

Bradamante (occasionally spelled Bradamant) is a fictional knight heroine in two epic poems of the Renaissance: Orlando Innamorato by Matteo Maria Boiardo and Orlando Furioso by Ludovico Ariosto. Since the poems exerted a wide influence on later culture, she became a recurring character in Western art.

== In Orlando Innamorato and Orlando Furioso ==
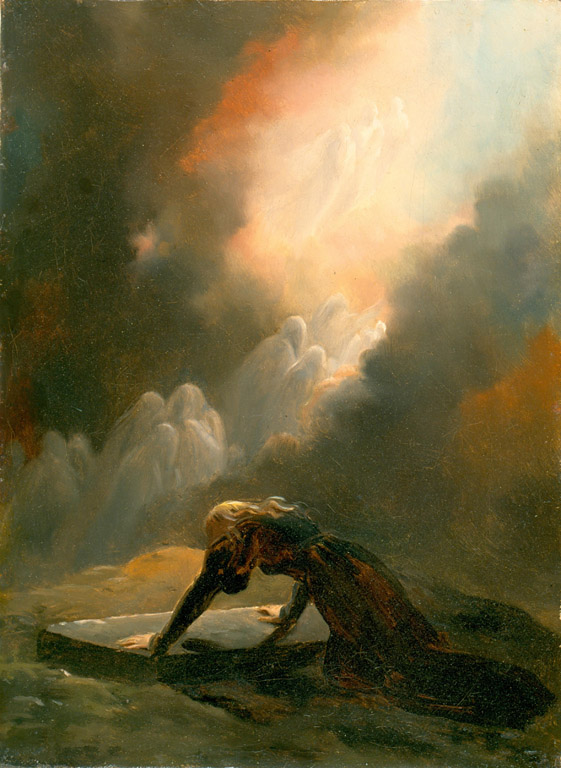
Bradamante at Merlin's Tomb by Alexandre-Evariste Fragonard

Bradamante, a female Christian knight in the service of Charlemagne, is the sister of Rinaldo and the daughter of Amon, duke of Dordognes. She falls in love with a Saracen warrior named Ruggiero but refuses to marry unless he converts from Islam. An expert in combat, she wields a magical lance that unhorses anyone it touches, and rescues Ruggiero from being imprisoned by the wizard Atlantes. She is described as wearing white, with a white shield and a crest of a pennon.

She is one of the French warriors fighting during a Saracen invasion of France. She is fighting the Saracen Rodomont when Ruggiero informs her Charlemagne is retreating. Bradamante tries to leave to join the rest of the French forces, but Rodomont keeps her from leaving. Ruggiero, finding Rodomont's actions dishonorable, steps in to fight Rodomont to allow Bradamante to leave. However, Bradamante cannot catch up to Charlemagne's army and returns to Rodomont and Ruggiero, feeling guilty for leaving someone else to fight in her place. Rodomont is impressed with the honor of Ruggiero and Bradamante and rides off, leaving Ruggiero and Bradamante together. They are mutually impressed with one another and share their identities. Bradamante also removes her helmet, revealing to Ruggiero for the first time that she is a woman. An ambush then manages to separate them.

The two lovers are separated many times in the story, and Bradamante faces many challenges. She travels to a castle made of steel to rescue Ruggiero from the wizard Atlantes with the help of the sorceress Melissa and a magic ring, escapes from a castle full of illusions, and encounters many other difficulties.

After the lovers are reunited, Rinaldo grants Ruggiero his blessing to marry Bradamante. However, her parents reject the suitor even after Ruggiero converts, preferring Leo, the son of the Greek emperor Constantine. Bradamante convinces Charlemagne to decree that she will only marry a man who can withstand her in battle, greatly angering her parents, who reluctantly agree. Ruggiero sets off to kill Leo; on the way, he finds the Constantine's forces battling the Bulgarians. Ruggiero immediately enters the battle to assist the Bulgarians, who had been losing, and manages to turn the tide of the battle. However, he is captured and imprisoned by the Greeks. Leo, impressed with Ruggiero's valor, frees him. He then asks for a favor, and Ruggiero, grateful for his freedom, promises to grant whatever Leo asks. Leo, having learned of Bradamante's challenge and knowing he is not strong enough to win against her, asks that Ruggiero fight Bradamante on his behalf. Ruggiero reluctantly keeps his promise and disguises himself as Leo to fight Bradamante. He wins the match and retreats to the woods, wishing to die. There, Leo finds him and asks what is wrong. After Ruggiero reveals his identity and that he is in love with Bradamante, Leo annuls the engagement to let Bradamante and Ruggiero wed. At the end, their marriage gives rise to the noble House of Este, who were patrons to both Boiardo and Ariosto.

The poems drew from legends of Charlemagne, chansons de geste, and blended recurring motifs found in the Matter of France and the Matter of Britain. Bradamante and Ruggiero's romance is most likely made to parallel the romance of Angelica and Orlando. Bradamante and Ruggiero's love is reciprocated and honorable, whereas Orlando is driven mad with love and Angelica despises him. Bradamante also spends much of Orlando Furioso chasing down her love to save him, contrasting with Angelica, who spends most of the story running from Orlando.

== In later works ==
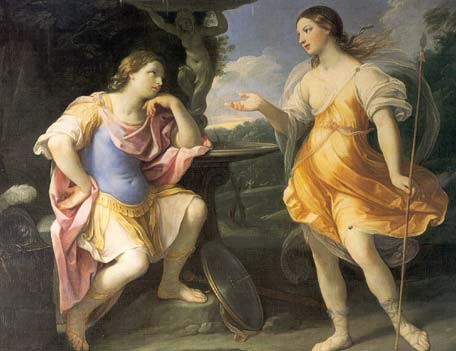
Bradamante and Fiordispina (1632–1635) by Guido Reni

In 1582, French dramatist Robert Garnier wrote a tragicomedy named Bradamante that further develops the love story between the heroine and Roger (Ruggiero).

Several eponymous operas have been written about the heroine:

- La Bradamante, written by Pietro Paolo Bissari with music composed by Francesco Cavalli, was first performed in 1650 at the Teatro Santi Giovanni e Paolo of Venice.
- Bradamante, composed by Louis Lacoste with a libretto written by Pierre-Charles Roy, was first performed at the Académie Royale de Musique (the Paris Opera) on 2 May 1707.
- Bradamante, written by Heinrich Joseph von Collin with music composed by Johann Friedrich Reichardt, was first performed in Vienna on 3 February 1809.
- Bradamante, composed by Eduard Tauwitz, was first performed in Riga in 1844.

She also appears as a character in Handel's opera Alcina and Johann Adolph Hasse's Il Ruggiero.

Bradamante appears as one of the leading characters in several novels. For example, in Italo Calvino's surrealistic, highly ironic 1959 novel Il Cavaliere inesistente (The Nonexistent Knight).

In cinema, she is depicted by Barbara De Rossi in the 1983 Italian film I Paladini: Storia d'armi e d'amori (also known as Paladins: The Story of Love and Arms or Hearts and Armour) – a film based on the legends surrounding the Peers of Charlemagne.

She appears as a Lancer class Servant in the mobile game Fate/Grand Order.

The mobile game Puzzles and Dragons has added her to their roster as "White Feathered Knight, Bradamante" with Active Skill "La Bella Paladina" and Leader Skill "I don't fraternize with weaklings".

== See also ==
- List of women warriors in folklore
