= Atlantes (sorcerer) =

Fictional character

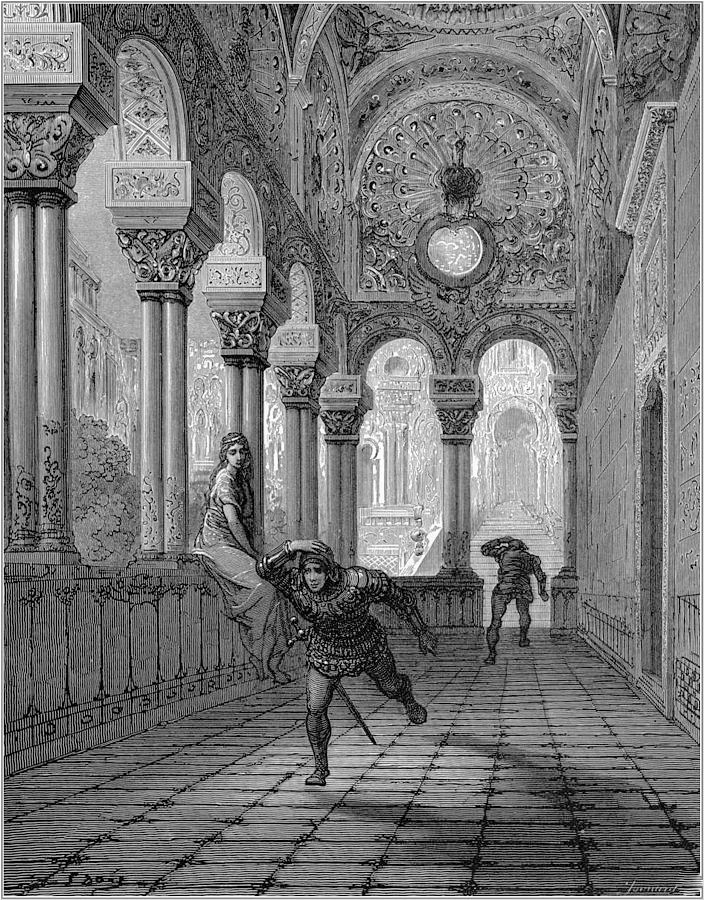
Enchanted knights see the illusions of their loves in Atlantes's castle; an illustration by Gustave Doré to Orlando Furioso

Atlantes (or Atalantes) was a powerful sorcerer featured in chansons de geste. In Boiardo's Orlando Innamorato (1482), where he is known as Atalante, the magician fears that Rugiero (Boiardo's spelling) will convert to Christianity and aid Charlemagne against the Saracens. To prevent this and forestall Rugiero's death, he constructs a magic garden ringed by glass on Mt. Carena in the Atlas Mountains in Morocco after which he is named. In Orlando Furioso, Atlantes' magical castle is filled with illusions, in order to divert Ruggiero (Ariosto's spelling) from what he has foretold as certain doom. Ruggiero is later set free by Bradamante and after numerous trials and quests sires a great line of heroes. He later dies betrayed fulfilling the destiny foretold by Atlantes.

== Etymology ==
The name Atlantes is the Latinized name of the Greek name Atlas, a term that identified the mountain range of the same name in North Africa. The figure of the sorcerer Atlantes draws inspiration from the Titan of classical mythology, who, in late antiquity, was reimagined as the legendary first king of Mauretania (the kingdom from which the term "Moors" derives).

The similarities between the myth and the literary character are profound: in addition to their name and geographical origin, both share the iconography of a wise and cunning elder. The most tragic connection, however, lies in their failure to protect their loved ones from a prophecy.

The Titan Atlas, warned by a prophecy that a son of Zeus would steal the golden apples and bring about the end of his daughters, the Hesperides, attempted in vain to drive away Perseus, only to be petrified (only later discovering that the prophecy actually concerned Hercules). Meanwhile, the sorcerer desperately tried to save his adopted son Ruggiero from his fate, attempting to prevent his union with Bradamante and his conversion to Christianity. Despite his spells, the sorcerer failed due to the intervention of Charlemagne's knights and ultimately died, consumed by anguish and grief.

The garden of the sorcerer Atlantes located on Mount Carena could be a reference to the garden of the Hesperides, which Pliny the Elder places in the ancient city of Lixus.

== See also ==
- Cantar de gesta
- Anglo-Norman literature
- Romance (heroic literature)

== Sources ==
- Boiardo: Orlando innamorato ed. Giuseppe Anceschi (Garzanti,1978)
- Boiardo: Orlando innamorato translated by Charles Stanley Ross, (Parlor Press, 2004).
- Ariosto:Orlando Furioso, verse translation by Barbara Reynolds in two volumes (Penguin Classics, 1975). Part one (cantos 1–23) ISBN 0-14-044311-8; part two (cantos 24–46) ISBN 0-14-044310-X
- Ariosto: Orlando Furioso ed. Marcello Turchi (Garzanti, 1974)
- Ariosto: Orlando Furioso: A Selection ed. Pamela Waley (Manchester University Press, 1975)
