= Orlando Innamorato =

Book by Matteo Maria Boiardo

- by Matteo Maria Boiardo
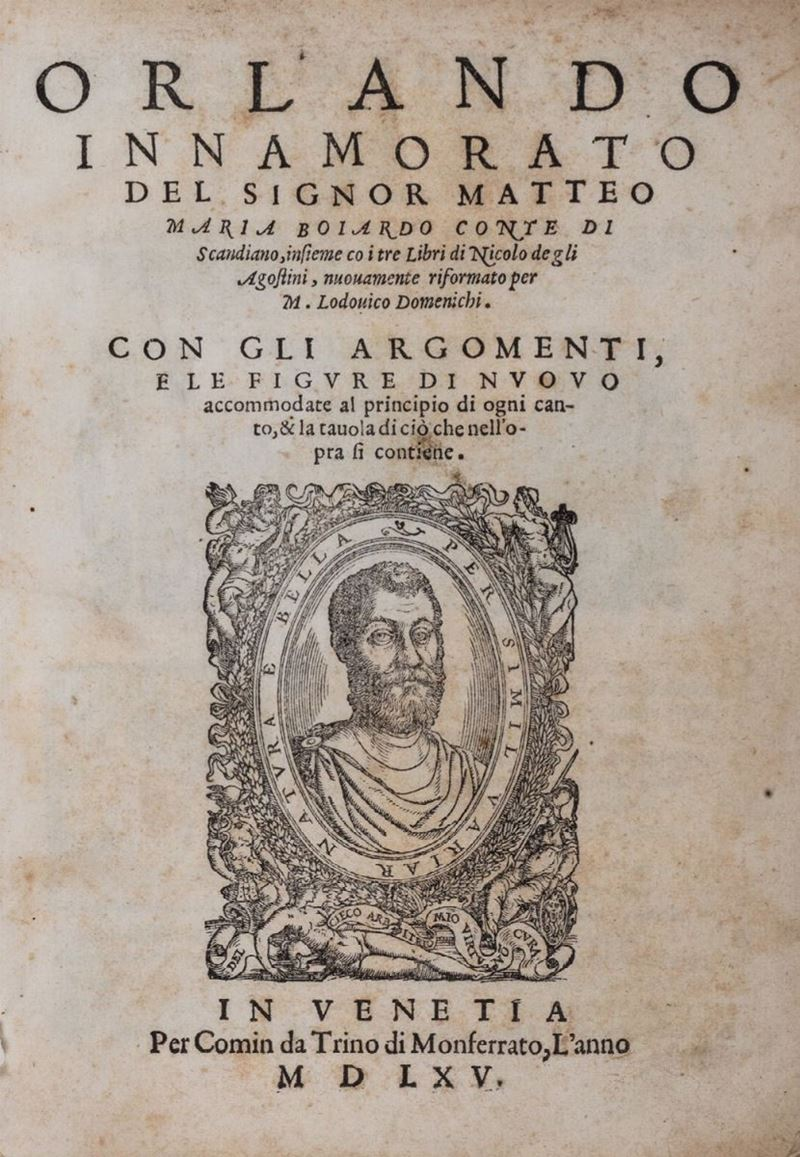
- Orlando Innamorato title page, Comin da Trino Edition, 1565
- Written: 1476–1495
- Country: Duchy of Ferrara
- Language: Italian
- Subject(s): Matter of France, Matter of Britain
- Genre: chivalric romance
- Form: epic poem of 69 cantos
- Meter: ottava rima
- Rhyme scheme: abababcc
- Publication date: 1483, 1495
- Published in English: 1823
- Media type: print: hardback
- Lines: 35,432
- Followed by: Orlando Furioso

Full text
- :it:Orlando innamorato at Wikisource

Orlando Innamorato ([orˈlando innamoˈraːto]; known in English as "Orlando in Love"; in Italian titled "Orlando innamorato" as the "I" is never capitalized) is an epic poem written by the Italian Renaissance author Matteo Maria Boiardo. The poem is a romance concerning the heroic knight Orlando (Roland). It was published between 1483 (first two books) and 1495 (third book published separately, first complete edition).

== Composition and publication ==
To material largely quarried from the Carolingian and Arthurian cycles, Boiardo added a superstructure of his own making. As the plot is not woven around a single pivotal action, the inextricable maze of most cunningly contrived episodes are seen to be linked, first, with the quest of the beautiful Angelica by love-smitten Orlando and the other enamored knights, then with the defense of Albracca by Angelica's father, the King of Cathay, against the beleaguering Tartars, and, finally, with the Moors' siege of Paris and their struggle with Charlemagne's army.

The poem, written in the ottava rima stanza rhythm, consists of 68 cantos and a half. Boiardo began the poem when he was about 38 years old, but interrupted it for a time because of the Ottoman–Venetian War (1463–1479). He is believed to have continued till 1486, but then left the poem unfinished. The last verses say:

Mentre ch'io canto, Iddio Redentore
vedo l'Italia tutta a fiamma e foco.

— Matteo Maria Boiardo, Orlando Innamorato

meaning

While I sing, Redemptor God, I see Italy covered in flame and fire.

The first two books were published sometime between 1482 and 1483, most likely by Pietro Giovanni di San Lorenzo in Reggio; but all copies were lost. It most likely bore the title L'innamoramento de Orlando. The third book first appeared in 1495 (Venice: Simone Bevilacqua) under the title El fin del inamoramento de' Orlando. The first complete edition was published later in 1495 (Scandiano: Camillo Boiardo). Like the editio princeps (first two books), the first complete edition of 1495 has been completely lost. The oldest copy which came down to us is the 1487 reedition of the first two books (Venice: Pietro de' Piasi); only one copy exists, kept at the Biblioteca Marciana. There is also only one extant copy of the 1495 Venetian edition of the third book, located in the Bavarian State Library Munich. The oldest complete edition we have is dated 1506 (Venice: Giorgio de' Rusconi); there also remains only one copy, kept at the Marciana.

== Plot ==
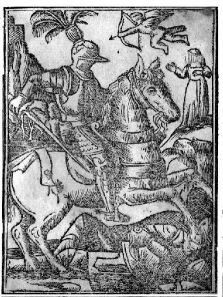
An illustration from the book

The beautiful Angelica, daughter of the king of Cataio (Cathay), comes to Charlemagne's court for a tournament in which both Christians and Pagans can participate. She offers herself as a prize to whoever will defeat her brother, Argalia, who in the consequent fighting competition imprisons one of the Christians. But the second knight to fight, Ferraguto (a.k.a. Ferraù), kills Argalia and Angelica flees, chased by leading paladins, especially Orlando and Rinaldo. Stopping in the Ardenne forest, she drinks at the Stream of Love (making her fall in love with Rinaldo), while Rinaldo drinks at the fount of hate (making him conceive a passionate hatred of Angelica). She asks the magician Malagigi to kidnap Rinaldo, and the magician brings him to an enchanted island, while she returns to Cataio where she is besieged by King Agrican, another of her admirers, in the fortress of Albraccà. Orlando comes to kill Agrican and to free her, and he succeeds. Afterwards, Rinaldo, who has escaped from the enchanted island, tries to convince him to return to France to fight alongside Charlemagne: consequently, Orlando and Rinaldo duel furiously.

In the meantime the Saracen king Agramante has invaded France with a massive army (along with Rodomonte, Ferraù, Gradasso, and many others), to avenge his father Troiano, previously killed by Orlando. Rinaldo rushes back to France, chased by Angelica in love with him, in turn chased by Orlando. Back in the Ardenne forest, this time Rinaldo and Angelica drink at the opposite founts. Orlando and Rinaldo duel again for Angelica, and Charlemagne decides to entrust her to the old and wise duke Namo, offering her to the one who will fight most valorously against the infidels. In the meantime, the Saracen paladin Ruggiero and Rinaldo's sister, Bradamante, fall in love. The poem stops there abruptly, with Boiardo's narrator explaining that he can write no more because Italy has been invaded by French troops headed by king Charles VIII.

== Influence ==
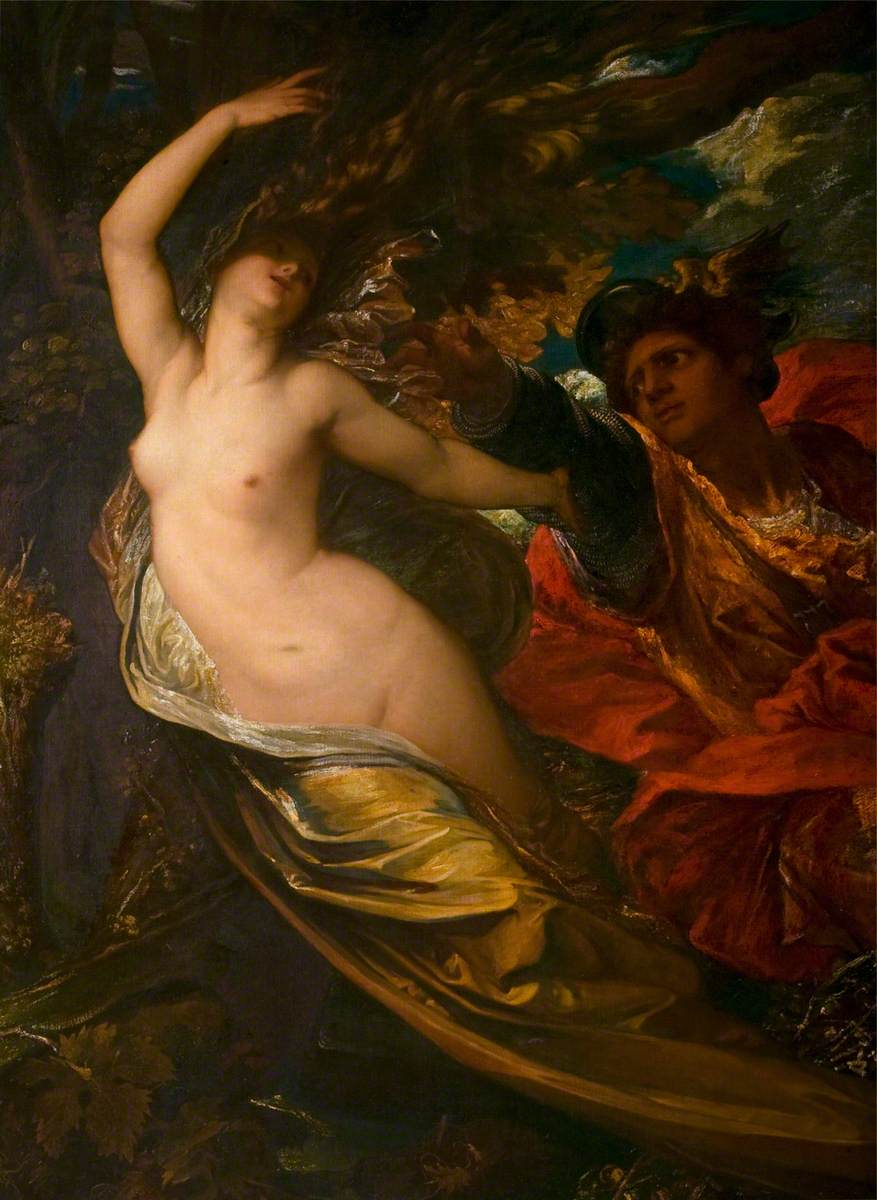
Orlando Pursuing the Fata Morgana by George Frederic Watts, 1848

In spite of its unfinished state and some deficiencies in rhythm, Boiardo's Orlando is considered a notable work of art. The story of Angelica's struggles and Orlando's pursuit were continued in Orlando Furioso by Ludovico Ariosto in 1516. The immediate success of the new poem easily surpassed the fame of Orlando Innamorato. Furthermore, in 1531 a minor Tuscan poet, Francesco Berni, re-wrote the poem in an elegant and regular Italian, since in the sixteenth century the vernacular traces found in Boiardo's work were no longer accepted. The original text, no longer read or published, was newly discovered by Antonio Panizzi in the British Museum Library (1830).

Another Renaissance poet, Torquato Tasso, borrowed many of Boiardo's epic conventions, although his Jerusalem Delivered does not use the Orlando frame.

An unabridged English translation was performed by Charles Stanley Ross, published in 2004 by Parlor Press.

== See also ==
- Ruggiero
- Rodomonte
- Sacripante
- Brunello
- Marfisa
- 1490s in poetry
- Bradamante
- Rinaldo
- Orlando furioso, a continuation by Ludovico Ariosto published between 1516 and 1532.
