= Barbara Reynolds =

British scholar and writer (1914–2015)

- Born: Eva Mary Barbara Reynolds; 13 June 1914; Bristol, England
- Died: 29 April 2015 (aged 100); Cambridge, England
- Occupation: Scholar
- Spouses: Lewis Thorpe (m. 1939; died 1977) Kenneth Imeson (m. 1982; died 1994)
- Children: 2

Eva Mary Barbara Reynolds (13 June 1914 – 29 April 2015) was an English scholar of Italian Studies, lexicographer and translator. She wrote and edited several books concerning Dorothy Sayers and was president of the Dorothy L. Sayers Society. She turned 100 in June 2014. Her first marriage was to the philologist and translator Lewis Thorpe.

== Early life ==
The daughter of Alfred Charles Reynolds, and the god-daughter of writer Dorothy L. Sayers, Reynolds was educated at St. Paul's Girls' School and University College London.

== Career ==
Reynolds was an Assistant Lecturer in Italian at the London School of Economics from 1937 to 1940. During the Second World War, she was an Assistant Lecturer (1940–1945) at the University of Cambridge, then University Lecturer in Italian Literature and Language from 1945 to 1962. She was Warden of Willoughby Hall, University of Nottingham, from 1963 to 1969 and Reader in Italian Studies at Nottingham from 1966 to 1978. Alongside her teaching work, she was Chief Executive and General Editor of the Cambridge Italian Dictionary from 1948 to 1981 and Managing Editor of Seven, an Anglo-American literary review, from 1980 to 2004.

Reynolds held the title of Honorary Reader in Italian at the University of Warwick from 1975 to 1980 and was visiting professor at the University of California, Berkeley, 1974–75, Wheaton College, Illinois, 1977–78, and 1982, Trinity College Dublin, 1980 and 1981, and Hope College, Michigan, 1982. She was chairman of the Dorothy L Sayers Society from 1986 to 1994 and President from 1995. Its officers in recent years have regularly programmed events for 13 June, the common birthday of Sayers and Reynolds. She died on 29 April 2015.

== Awards and honours ==
The Italian government awarded Reynolds its silver medal for Services to Italian culture in 1964 and made her Cavaliere Ufficiale al Merito della Repubblica Italiana in 1978. She won the Edmund G. Gardner Memorial Prize for Italian Studies in 1964 and the Monselice International Literary Prize in 1976 for her translation of Orlando Furioso.

== Major publications ==
Her major work is the Cambridge Italian Dictionary, of which she was the General Editor. The first volume appeared in 1962 and the second in 1981. Beyond the Dictionary, her first book was a study of Alessandro Manzoni. She completed and annotated Paradiso, the last volume of Dorothy L. Sayers' three-volume translation of Dante's Divine Comedy, which was left unfinished at Dorothy Sayers' death. Reynolds afterwards translated Dante's La Vita Nuova and Ariosto's Orlando Furioso for the Penguin Classics. She wrote a study of Dante's life and work, Dante: The Poet, the Political Thinker, the Man. In 1993 Reynolds published a biography of Sayers, who was her god-mother, called Dorothy L. Sayers: Her Life and Soul (1993). She also edited four volumes of Sayers's letters and an additional volume.

== Bibliography ==
- Ariosto, Ludovico (1975). Orlando Furioso (The Frenzy of Orlando). Part One. Translated by Barbara Reynolds. Penguin Classics. ISBN 978-0-140-44311-0.
- Ariosto, Ludovico (1977). Orlando Furioso (The Frenzy of Orlando). Part Two. Translated by Barbara Reynolds. Penguin Classics. ISBN 978-0-140-44310-3.
- Cambridge Italian Dictionary: Volume 1, Italian-English. Cambridge University Press. 1962. ISBN 9780521060592.
- Cambridge Italian Dictionary: Volume 2, English-Italian. Cambridge University Press. 1981. ISBN 978-0521087087.
- Dante: The Poet, the Political Thinker, the Man. London: I.B. Tauris. 2006. ISBN 978-1-84511-161-8.
- Dante Alighieri (1962). The Comedy of Dante Alighieri, the Florentine. Cantica III, Paradise. Translated by Dorothy L. Sayers; Barbara Reynolds. Penguin Books. ISBN 978-0140441055.
- Dorothy L. Sayers: Her Life and Soul. London: Hodder & Stoughton. 2002 [1993]. ISBN 0-340-72845-0.
- The Letters of Dorothy L. Sayers: Volume One 1899–1936 : the making of a detective novelist. London: Hodder & Stoughton. 1995. ISBN 9780340536230.
- The Letters of Dorothy L. Sayers: Volume Two 1937–1943: from novelist to playwright. London: Hodder & Stoughton. 1997. ISBN 9780951800041.
- The Letters of Dorothy L. Sayers: Volume Three 1944–1950: a noble daring. London: Hodder & Stoughton. 1998. ISBN 9780951800058.
- The Letters of Dorothy L. Sayers: Volume Four 1951–1957: in the midst of life. London: Hodder & Stoughton. 2000. ISBN 9780951800065.
- The Letters of Dorothy L. Sayers: Volume Five: child and woman of her time. London: Hodder & Stoughton. 2002. ISBN 9780951800072.
- The Passionate Intellect: Dorothy L. Sayers's Encounter with Dante. Kent, Ohio: Kent State University Press. 1989. ISBN 0-87338-373-7.
- Penguin Italian Dictionary. Penguin. 1992. ISBN 978-1854710963.
- Petrarch : The Forgotten Genius. London: I.B. Tauris. 2009. ISBN 978-1845119850.
- Radice, William; Reynolds, Barbara, eds. (1987). The Translator's Art: Essays in Honour of Betty Radice. Penguin Books. ISBN 0-14-009226-9.
