= Angelica (character) =

Princess in the epic poem Orlando innamorato by Matteo Maria Boiardo

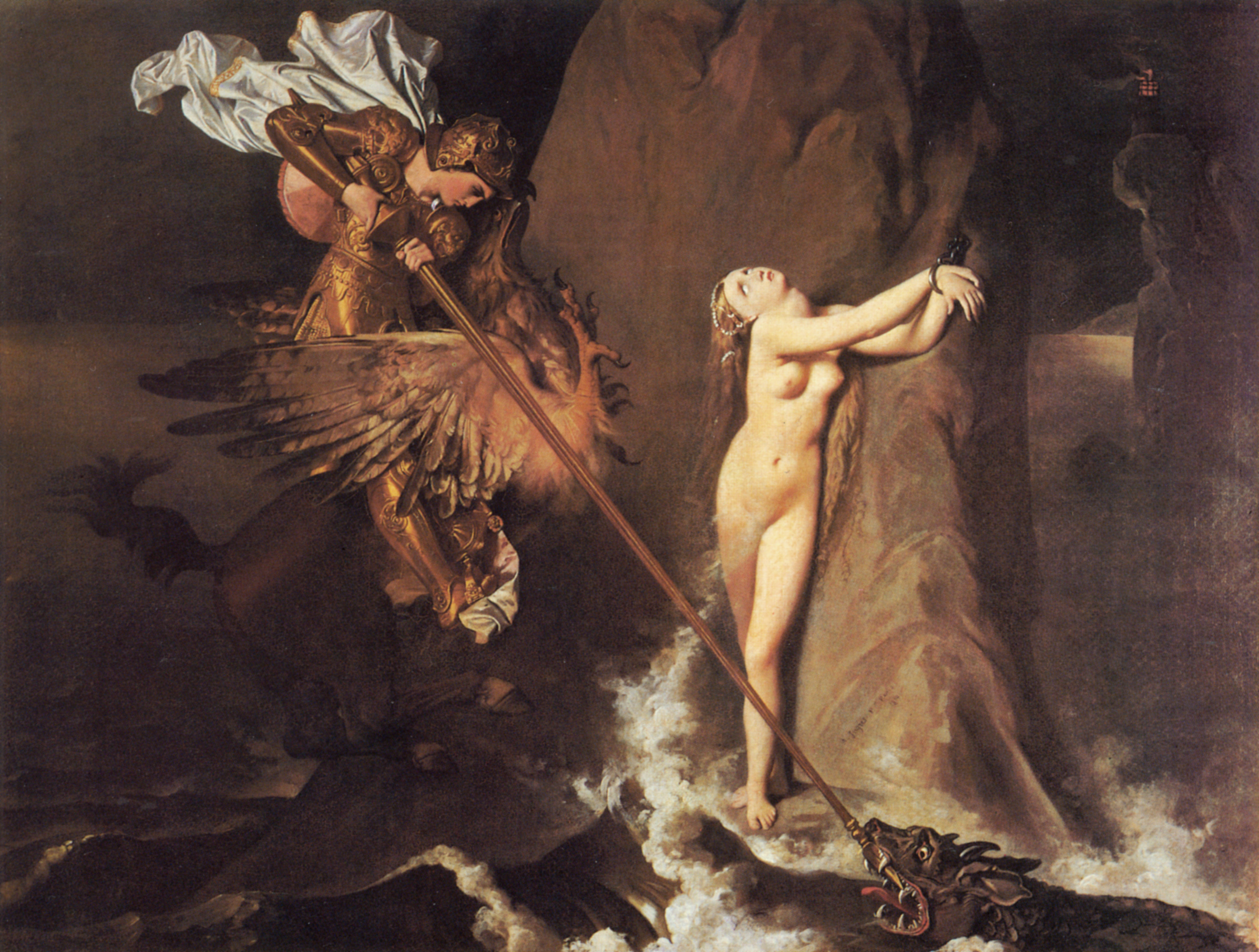
Ruggiero Rescuing Angelica by Jean Auguste Dominique Ingres

Angelica is a princess in the epic poem Orlando innamorato by Matteo Maria Boiardo. She reappears in the saga's continuation, Orlando furioso by Ludovico Ariosto, and in various later works based on the two original Orlando pieces. The narratives are part of the Matter of France, a cycle of legendary history stories based on the adventures of Charlemagne and his paladins.

== Orlando Innamorato ==
In Orlando Innamorato, Angelica is introduced as the daughter of Galafrone, the king of "Cathay" or "India". Cathay commonly refers to China, not India, but this seeming inconsistency can be resolved: Boiardo considered Cathay to be a city, and "Cathay was a city in India inferior or Serica" according to the Mappamondo Borgiano. (Note: Galafrone's realm is vast, with Cathay as its capital city. Albraca a fortress, a day's journey west.) She comes to Charlemagne's court with her brother Argalia (who assumes the identity of a knight named Uberto dal Leòne). All the knights are smitten with her, especially the cousins Orlando (Roland) and Rinaldo (Renaud), but the protective Argalia will only allow her to marry a man who can best him in a joust. When Argalia eventually falls to the Saracen knight Ferraù, Orlando and Rinaldo threaten to destroy each other over her. As the Saracens lay siege to Duke Naimon's estate, Charlemagne promises Angelica's hand to whichever cousin fights best for him. The battle is lost, however, and the characters go on to further adventure: Rinaldo and Angelica drink from magic fountains twice, each time leaving one madly in love and the other indifferent, while Orlando loses his wits to his passion.

== Orlando Furioso ==
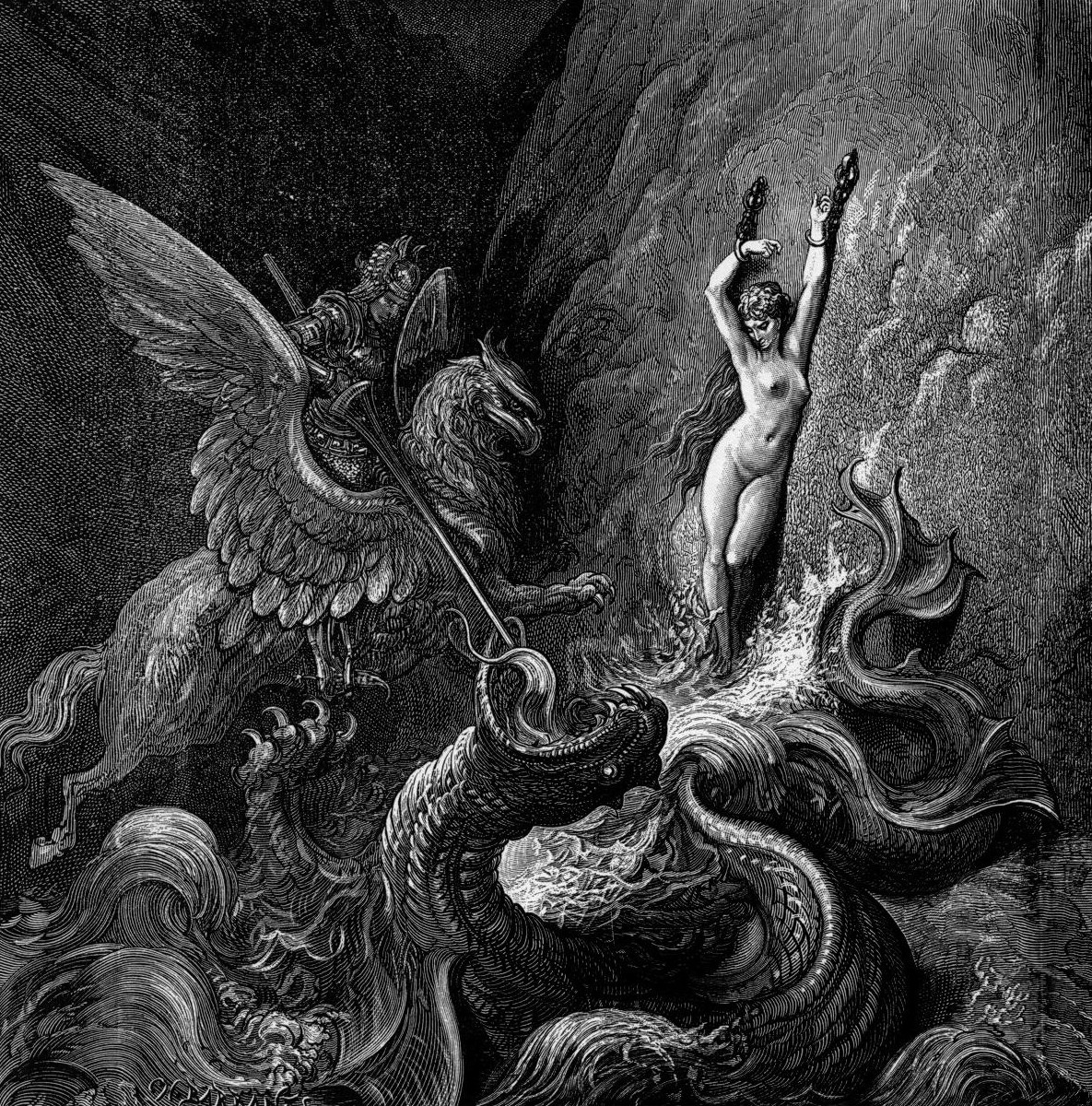
Illustration of Ruggiero rescuing Angelica for Orlando Furioso by Gustave Doré, 19th century

Boiardo left his epic unfinished, but the action was taken up in Orlando furioso. Angelica is continually sought throughout the world by Orlando, Rinaldo, and the best knights from various countries. She eventually finds herself naked and chained to a rock in the sea, offered as a sacrifice to a sea monster called the orc (a situation identical to the perils of Andromeda). She is rescued by the African knight Ruggiero, who gives her a ring of invisibility. Later, pursued by the lovelorn Orlando, she uses the ring and vanishes. She ultimately falls in love with an ordinary North African soldier named Medoro, whom she nurses back to health, and returns with him to Cathay. Orlando goes mad when he learns of their marriage from a shepherd and his wife. He requires the aid of his cousin Astolpho to recover his senses. Cured entirely of his love, Orlando stops his search for Angelica, and she no longer appears in the poem.

== Other references ==
Angelica is mentioned in chapter 6 of Mary Shelley's Frankenstein (1818).
