= Prodi (surname) =

Prodi is a surname. Notable people with the surname include:

- Giovanni Prodi (1925–2010), an Italian mathematician;
- Giorgio Prodi (1928–1987), an Italian medical scientist, oncologist, and semiotician;
- Paolo Prodi (1932–2016), an Italian historian and politician;
- Romano Prodi (born 1939), an Italian politician and statesman;
- Vittorio Prodi (born 1937), an Italian politician.
