= Paolo Prodi =

Italian historian and politician (1932–2016)

Member of the Chamber of Deputies
- In office 9 December 1993 – 14 April 1994
- Constituency: Trento–Bolzano

Personal details
- Born: Paolo Prodi; 3 October 1932 Scandiano, Kingdom of Italy
- Died: 16 December 2016 (aged 84) Bologna, Italy
- Party: The Network
- Spouse: Dede Prodi (m. 1969–2016)
- Children: 4
- Education: Università Cattolica del Sacro Cuore

Paolo Prodi (3 October 1932 – 16 December 2016) was an Italian historian and politician.

== Early life and education ==
Born on 3 October 1932 in Scandiano, in the province of Reggio Emilia, he was one of the nine children of the engineer Mario Prodi and the elementary school teacher Enrichetta Franzoni. He was the brother of the politician, manager, and economist Romano Prodi, the professor and politician Vittorio Prodi, the physicist Franco Prodi, the oncologist Giorgio Prodi, and the mathematician Giovanni Prodi. In 1945, at the age of 13, Prodi saw his parish priest killed, accused by the Italian partisans of wartime collaboration with Nazi Germany. After having won a scholarship at the Augustinianum College, he graduated in political science at the Università Cattolica del Sacro Cuore in Milan, and then completed his studies at the University of Bonn as a student of Hubert Jedin. Along with Jedin, he completed his study of the Council of Trent.

== Career ==
Prodi taught modern history at the University of Trento, of which he was the rector from 1972 to 1978 and dean of the Faculty of Letters from 1985 to 1988, the Sapienza University of Rome, and the University of Bologna, of which he was the dean of the Faculty of Teaching from 1969 to 1972. He was also president of the Giunta Storica Nazionale (formerly Giunta Centrale per gli Studi Storici) and a member of the Austrian Academy of Sciences and Accademia Nazionale dei Lincei. In 1965, he was one of the founders of the cultural and political association Il Mulino, with which he published several of his major works, such as Giuseppe Dossetti e le Officine bolognesi, Il sacramento del potere. Il giuramento politico nella storia costituzionale dell'Occidente, Il Sovrano Pontefice. Un corpo e due anime, Il tramonto della rivoluzione, Settimo non rubare, Storia moderna o genesi della modernità?, and Una storia della giustizia. Dal pluralismo dei fori al moderno dualismo tra coscienza e diritto.

Considered one of the leading experts in the history of law and of the Catholic Church, Prodi founded in 1973, together with Jedin, the Italian-German Historical Institute of Trento, which he directed for more than two decades. In the 1992 Italian general election, Prodi was a candidate for Leoluca Orlando's The Network; he later abandoned this movement, in disagreement with Orlando's stance in favour of the abrogative referendum proposals that were subjected to popular approval in the 1993 Italian referendum. In 2000, he won the saggistica (non-fiction) category of the Premio Nazionale Letterario Pisa. In 2007, he was awarded the Alexander von Humboldt Prize.

For more times, Paolo Prodi was invited by and gave some lectures at the Grand Orient of Italy.

== Personal life and death ==
Prodi was married to Dede since 1969. They had four children: Giovanni, Gabriele, Marta, and Mario, all of whom grew up in Bologna. Prodi died in Bologna on 16 December 2016 at the age of 84. The building of the Department of Letters and Philosophy of the University of Trento was named after him. The family donated his archive to the university.

== Works ==
- Prodi, Paolo (1959). Il Cardinale Gabriele Paleotti (1522-1597) (in Italian). Vol. 1. Rome: Edizioni di Storia e Letteratura. ISBN 88-63-72071-1.
- Prodi, Paolo; Alberigo, Giuseppe; Joannou, Périclès Pierre Joannou; Leonardi, Claudio, eds. (1962). Conciliorum Oecomenicorum Decreta (in Italian). Freiburg im Breisgau: Verlag Herder. ISBN 84-15-02749-4.
- Prodi, Paolo (1967). Il Cardinale Gabriele Paleotti (1522-1597) (in Italian). Vol. 2. Rome: Edizioni di Storia e Letteratura. ISBN 88-63-72035-5.
- Prodi, Paolo (1973). "The Structure and Organization of the Church in Renaissance Venice. Suggestions for Research". In Hale, John R. (ed.). Renaissance Venice. London: Faber and Faber. pp. 409–430. ISBN 05-71-08975-5.
- Prodi, Paolo; Jedin, Hubert, eds. (1979). Il Concilio di Trento come crocevia della politica europea (in Italian). Bologna: Il Mulino. ISBN 88-15-16962-8.
- Prodi, Paolo (1982). Il Sovrano Pontefice. Un corpo e due anime: la monarchia papale nella prima età moderna (in Italian). Bologna: Il Mulino. ISBN 88-15-21858-0.
- Prodi, Paolo; Johanek, Peter, eds. (1984). Strutture ecclesiastiche in Italia e in Germania prima della Riforma. Bologna: Il Mulino. ISBN 88-15-00616-8.
- Prodi, Paolo (1992). Il sacramento del potere. Il giuramento politico nella storia costituzionale dell'Occidente (in Italian). Bologna: Il Mulino. ISBN 88-15-03444-7.
- Prodi, Paolo; Cozzi, Gaetano, eds. (1994). Storia di Venezia. Dal Rinascimento al barocco (in Italian). Vol. VI. Rome: Istituto della Enciclopedia Italiana. OCLC 885586276.
- Prodi, Paolo; Penuti, Carla, eds. (1994). Disciplina dell'anima, disciplina del corpo e disciplina della società tra Medioevo ed età moderna (in Italian). Bologna: Il Mulino. ISBN 88-15-04805-7.
- Prodi, Paolo; Reinhard, Wolfgang, eds. (1996). Il Concilio di Trento e il moderno (in Italian). Bologna: Il Mulino. ISBN 88-15-05700-5.
- Prodi, Paolo; Paolini, Lorenzo, eds. (1997). Storia della Chiesa di Bologna (in Italian). Vol. 1. Bergamo: Bolis. ISBN 88-78-27085-7.
- Prodi, Paolo; Paolini, Lorenzo, eds. (1997). Storia della Chiesa di Bologna (in Italian). Vol. 2. Bergamo: Bolis. OCLC 797570318.
- Prodi, Paolo; Angelozzi, Giancarlo; Penuti, Carla (1999). Introduzione allo studio della storia moderna (in Italian). Bologna: Il Mulino. ISBN 88-15-07091-5.
- Prodi, Paolo (2000). Una storia della giustizia. Dal pluralismo dei fori al moderno dualismo tra coscienza e diritto (in Italian). Bologna: Il Mulino. ISBN 88-15-07349-3.
- Prodi, Paolo (2005). La storia moderna (in Italian). Bologna: Il Mulino. ISBN 88-15-10676-6.
- Prodi, Paolo (2007). VenturellI, Piero (ed.). Lessico per un'Italia civile (in Italian). Reggio Emilia: Diabasis. ISBN 978-88-8103-571-7.
- Prodi, Paolo (2009). Settimo Non rubare. Furto e mercato nella storia dell'Occidente (in Italian). Bologna: Il Mulino. ISBN 978-88-15-13074-7.
- Prodi, Paolo (2010). Il paradigma tridentino. Un'epoca della storia della Chiesa (in Italian). Brescia: Morcelliana. ISBN 978-88-372-2462-2.
- Prodi, Paolo (2012). Storia moderna o genesi della modernità? (in Italian). Bologna: Il Mulino. ISBN 978-88-15-23832-0.
- Prodi, Paolo (2012). Cristianesimo e potere (in Italian). Bologna: Il Mulino. ISBN 978-88-15-24053-8.
- Prodi, Paolo (2013). Profezia vs utopia (in Italian). Bologna: Il Mulino. ISBN 978-88-15-24494-9.
- Prodi, Paolo (2013). Università dentro e fuori (in Italian). Bologna: Il Mulino. ISBN 978-88-15-24733-9.
- Prodi, Paolo (2014). Arte e pietà nella Chiesa tridentina (in Italian). Bologna: Il Mulino. ISBN 978-88-15-25110-7.
- Prodi, Paolo (2015). Il tramonto della rivoluzione (in Italian). Bologna: Il Mulino. ISBN 978-88-15-25727-7.
- Prodi, Paolo (2015). Homo europaeus (in Italian). Bologna: Il Mulino. ISBN 978-88-15-25872-4.
- Prodi, Paolo (2016). Giuseppe Dossetti e le Officine bolognesi (in Italian). Bologna: Il Mulino. ISBN 978-88-15-26352-0.
- Prodi, Paolo; Cacciari, Massimo (2016). Occidente senza utopie (in Italian). Bologna: Il Mulino. ISBN 978-88-15-26513-5.

== Honours ==
=== Italy ===
- Grand Official of the Supreme Order of the Most Holy Annunciation, 1975.
- Italian Medal of Merit for Culture and Art, 1976.
- Italian Medal of Merit for Culture and Art, 1987.

=== Foreign ===
- Cross 1st Class of the Order of Merit of the Federal Republic of Germany, 1992.
- Austrian Decoration for Science and Art, 1994.
