= Matteo Maria Boiardo =

Italian Renaissance poet (1440–1494)

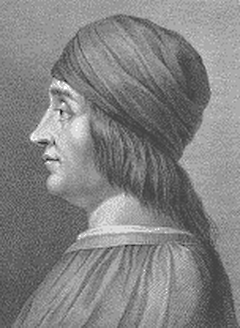
- Matteo Maria Boiardo
- Born: 1440; Scandiano, Duchy of Modena and Reggio
- Died: 19/20 December 1494 (aged 53–54); Reggio Emilia, Duchy of Modena and Reggio
- Occupation: Poet
- Parent(s): Giovanni Boiardo and Lucia Boiardo (née Strozzi)
- Writing career
- Language: Italian
- Period: Renaissance
- Genre: Epic poetry
- Subject: Chivalry
- Notable work: Orlando innamorato
- Movement: Renaissance literature

Matteo Maria Boiardo (US: /bɔɪˈɑːrdoʊ, boʊˈjɑːrdoʊ/ boy-AR-doh, boh-YAR-doh, Italian: [matˈtɛːo maˈriːa boˈjardo]; 1440 – 19/20 December 1494) was an Italian Renaissance poet, best known for his epic poem Orlando innamorato.

== Early life ==
Boiardo was born in 1440, at or near, Scandiano (today's province of Reggio Emilia); the son of Giovanni di Feltrino and Lucia Strozzi. His mother Lucia was the sister of the humanist poet Tito Vespasiano Strozzi, his father Giovanni the son of Feltrino Boiardo, whom Niccolò III d'Este, Marquis of Ferrara, had made Count of Scandiano, with seignorial power over Arceto, Casalgrande, Gesso, and Torricella. Boiardo was an ideal example of a gifted and accomplished courtier, possessing both a gallant heart and deep humanistic learning.

In 1441 the family moved to Ferrara, where Matteo Maria grew up until his father died in 1451. At an early age he entered the University of Ferrara, where he acquired a good knowledge of Greek and Latin, and even of the Oriental languages. He was in due time admitted doctor in philosophy and in law.

When his grandfather Feltrino died in 1460, Matteo Maria and his cousin Giovanni inherited the fief of Scandiano with its attached lands, but the joint administration gave rise to family feuds culminating in 1474, when Matteo Maria narrowly averted poisoning at the instigation of his aunt Taddea Pio, Giovanni's mother. This caused the lands to be divided, and Boiardo became Lord of Scandiano. But already in 1461 disputes with relatives had forced him to take up residence in Ferrara.

== Career ==
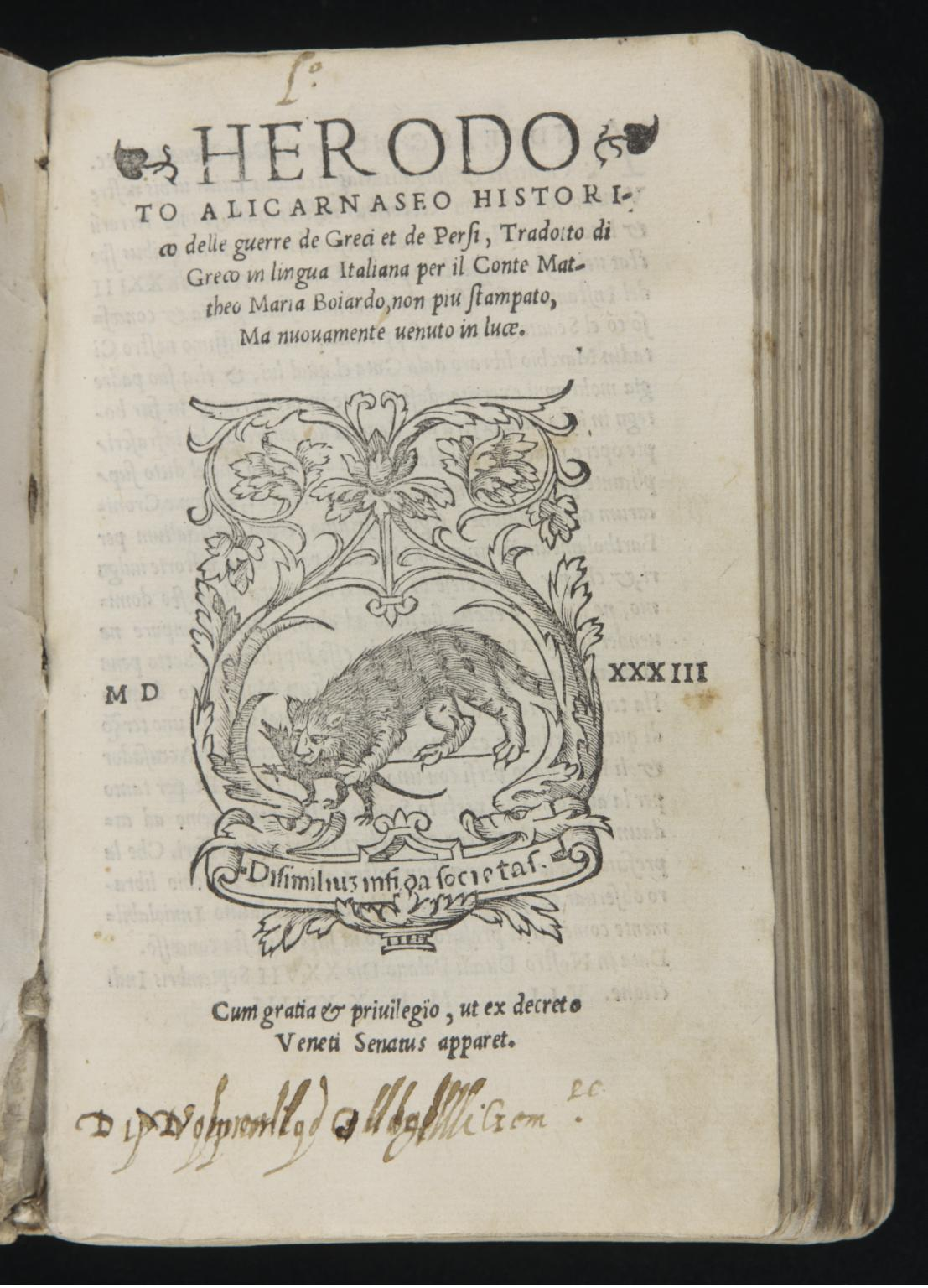
Italian translation of Herodotus' Histories by Count Matteo Maria Boiardo, published in Venice in 1533.

Up to the year of his marriage to Taddea Gonzaga, the daughter of the Count of Novellara (1472), he had received many marks of favour from Borso d'Este, Duke of Ferrara, having been sent to meet Frederick III (1469), and afterwards visiting Pope Paul II (1471) in the train of Borso. In 1473 he joined the retinue which escorted Eleonora of Aragon, the daughter of Ferdinand I, to meet her spouse, Ercole, at Ferrara.

In 1476 Boiardo returned to Ferrara to become Duke Ercole's companion; here he witnessed the unfolding of Niccolò d'Este's conspiracy against Ercole, his cousin, whose victory Boiardo promptly celebrated in his Latin Epigrammata. In 1478 Boiardo married Taddea dei Gonzaga of Novellara, by whom he had six children.

In 1481 Boiardo was invested with the governorship of Reggio, an office which he filled with noted success till his death, except for a brief interval (1481–86) when he was governor of Modena. The outbreak of war between Ferrara and Venice, the vicissitudes of which are reflected in his Ecloghe volgari, and his concern for his native Scandiano, forced him to relinquish the post.

In 1487 Ercole appointed Boiardo ducal emissary for Reggio, an office which he was to hold until his death, and which has left us the largest nucleus of his Lettere, mostly of an administrative nature. When Charles VIII of France invaded Italy, in September 1494, Boiardo's health had deteriorated. He died in Reggio on 19 December, his death, with that of Poliziano and Giovanni Pico della Mirandola in the same year, marking the end of an era.

== Writings ==
In his youth Boiardo had been a successful imitator of Petrarch's love poems. For Ercole d'Este he produced his first humanist works in Latin, the Carmina de laudibus Estensium and the Pastoralia, both dating from 1463–4; he also undertook a number of free translations into the vernacular, from Cornelius Nepos, Xenophon, Apuleius, Herodotus, and the chronicler Riccobaldo of Ferrara.

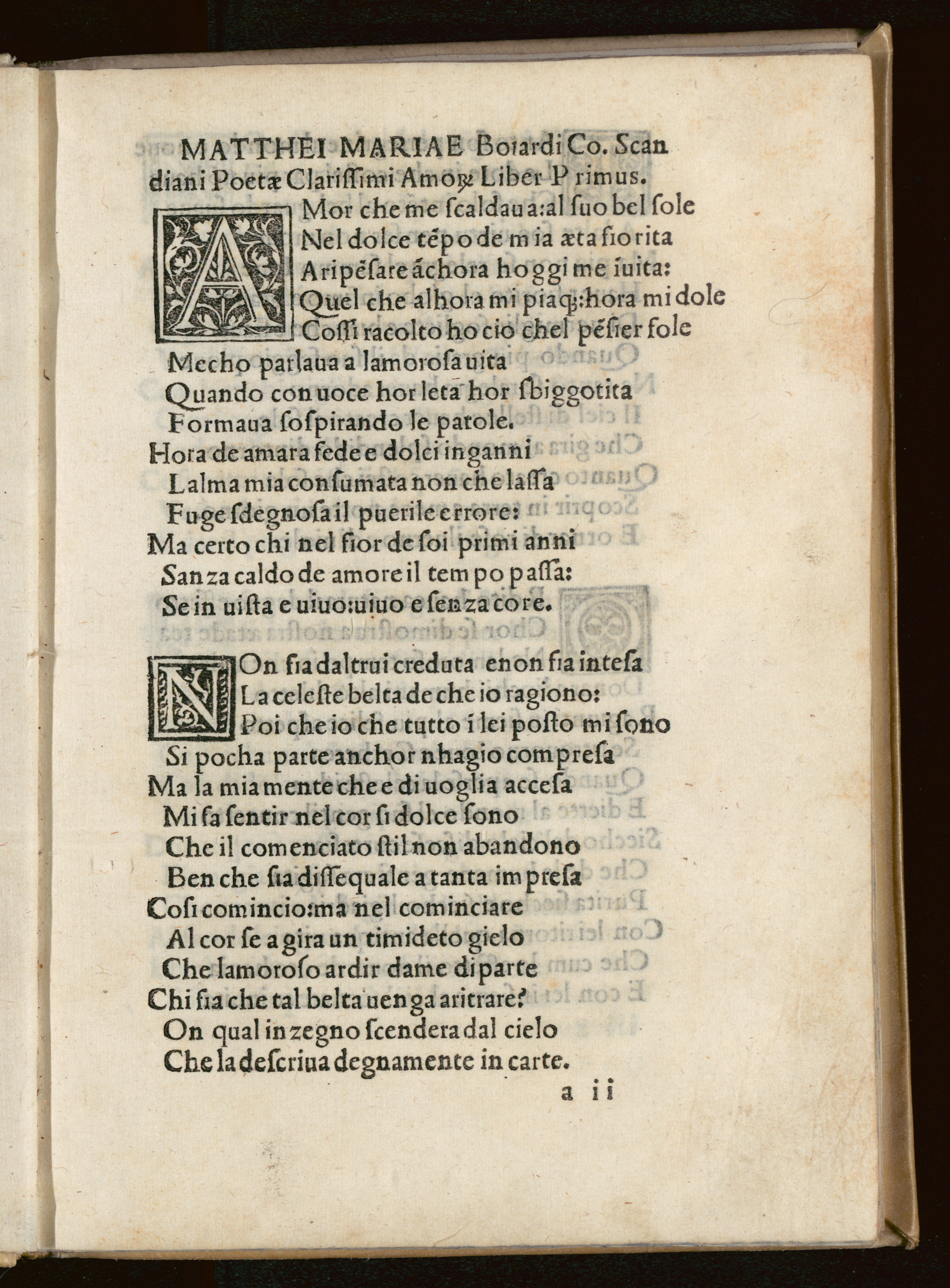
Amorum libri, 1499

While in Reggio in 1469 Boiardo met Antonia Caprara, who inspired his canzoniere, his first original work in the vernacular, now regarded as one of the highest poetic achievements of the 15th century. Entitled Amorum libri tres and comprising 180 sonnets, canzoni, and madrigals, it recounts in Petrarchan mode the three phases of the poet's love, from initial joy to subsequent disillusionment and final mourning. Shortly afterwards Boiardo wrote the comedy Il Timone (1487?), loosely based on the dialogue of the same name by Lucian.

Around 1476 Boiardo began his major work, Orlando Innamorato, originally also called Inamoramento de Orlando, a grandiose poem of chivalry and romance absorbing the poetic experience of the canzoniere and the encomiastic intent of the earlier Latin works (the Encyclopædia Britannica Eleventh Edition provides a detailed discussion of Orlando in its several editions). Within the chivalric tradition Orlando Innamorato is the first poem to effect a deliberate fusion of the Carolingian and Arthurian narrative cycles; hence the poem's novelty, the fact that Orlando, the hero of the Song of Roland, is in love. Seen as a cosmic force as well as an essential attribute to chivalry, love is by far the main theme, alongside other major themes of arms, magic, honour, and adventure. Fabulous and anachronistic as this narrative material may seem, the poet relates it to the present by creating the illusion of a live recitation to a courtly audience, whose reactions he registers at various points. Within this frame the narration itself unfolds at a relentless pace, governed by the so-called entrelacement technique of suspending one story and shifting to another at the point of maximum expectation.

Almost all Boiardo's works, and especially the Orlando innamorato, were composed for the amusement of Duke Ercole and his court, though not written within its precincts. His practice, it is said, was to retire to Scandiano or some other of his estates, and there to devote himself to composition, and historians state that he took care to insert in the descriptions of his poem those of the agreeable environs of his château, and that the greater part of the names of his heroes, as Mandricardo, Gradasse, Sacripant, Agramant and others, were merely the names of some of his peasants, which, from their uncouthness, appeared to him proper to be given to Saracen warriors.

=== Tarot ===
Boiardo wrote a lengthy poem detailing a custom-made and historically relevant Tarocchi deck of his own making, providing an insightful scholarly glimpse into the game's early stages of development. As the contemporary Sola Busca tarot, it exclusively features mythical and historical figures of classical antiquity for its highly idiosyncratic set of trumps and coat cards, a trait characteristic of French-suited packs. Each trump also depicts specific wildlife, similar to later animal tarots.

==== Suits ====
A single such deck, produced according to the poem shortly after Boiardo's death, and comprising only 44 out of at least 56 cards (possibly 78, if it originally included the 22 trumps as well) has partially survived, having previously belonged to captain H. E. Rimington Wilson (1899–1971), a collector of rare playing cards, and being auctioned as Lot 310 at Christie's on the 24th of November, 1971 for 350 guineas (£367.50 in new pence). It consisted of four unique suits, representing the main Stoic passions: whips (Timor > fear), eyes (Gelosia > jealousy), vases (Speranza > hope) and arrows (Amor > love), each composed of ten pip cards (ace through 10) and four face cards: fante ("infantryman" / knave), cavallo ("horse" / knight), donna ("lady" / queen) and re ("king"), three framed lines from the poem being featured at the top of each card.

Court cards
	Positive pair		Negative pair	
Suit	Love or Arrows (Note: Reminiscent of the suit of swords or batons; see medieval weaponry.)	Caption and imagery	Jealousy or Eyes (Note: Reminiscent of the suit of coins.)	Caption and imagery
Knave	Polyphemus	Depicted as a Cyclopes; Mentions Acis and Galatea	Argus Panoptes	Portrayed as a Cyclopes, with a peacock (Note: A symbol of Juno. (Note: Also found in Swiss Tarot, Tarot de Besançon, and the contemporary da Tortona deck.)) at his feet. Mentions Io.
Knight	Paris of Troy	Mentions Helen of Troy (Note: The queen of coins in the contemporary Sola Busca tarot.); See Trojan War	Turnus	See Virgil's Aeneid
Queen	Venus (Note: Portrayed riding a chariot drawn by the respective pairs of animals.) (Note: Also found in the contemporary da Tortona deck, featuring doves there as well.)	Also depicts a pair of white swans and white doves. Mentions Adonis.	Juno	Also depicts a pair of peacocks. Mentions; Jupiter's infidelities.
King	Jupiter (Note: Also found in Tarocco Siciliano and the contemporary Sola Busca tarot.)	Portrayed as a thunder god (Note: The king of arrows. The Tower, depicting a lightning strike in most non-Italian tarots, save for Viéville, is labelled The Arrow in Tarocco Bolognese.); Also depicts Ganymede	Vulcan	Depicted as a fire god. Mentions Venus' (Note: Venus is usually the brightest planet in the sky.) affair with Mars, witnessed by The Sun.
Suit	Hope or Vases (Note: Reminiscent of the suit of cups.)	Caption and imagery	Fear or Whips	Caption and imagery
Knave	Horatius Cocles	Also depicts Pons Sublicius (Note: Similarly to Horatius Cocles' heroic defense of Pons Sublicius, Catulus defeated Lepidus at Ponte Milvio. Featured as Trumps III and V in the contemporary Sola Busca tarot.)	Phineus (Note: His niece is featured on Trump XIV.)	Mentions Medusa
Knight	Jason	Mentions the Argonauts and the Golden Fleece. See Argonautica. (Note: The contemporary Sola Busca tarot features its writer as the knight of wands.)	Ptolemy XIII	Mentions Caesar, Pompey; See Trumps XV, XVII
Queen	Judith (Note: The queen of hearts in French-suited playing cards.)	Also depicts Holofernes (Note: Lying at her feet, carrying his bearded head in his own hands, resembling the Visconti-Sforza trump depicting hope, one of the three theological virtues, piously kneeling in prayer on a green floor, Boiardo's analogous card suit employing the same color.); Mentions Bethulia	Andromache	Mentions Hector, Odysseus; See Homer's Odyssey
King	Aeneas	Depicted as king of Alba; See Virgil's Aeneid	Dionysius I (Note: The eponymous Dionysus is the equivalent of Bacchus, also found in Belgian Tarot and the contemporary da Tortona and Sola Busca decks.)	See sword of Damocles

==== Trumps ====
Its lost trumps would have contained ten consecutive pairs of men and women, each representing a vice and a virtue, respectively:

No.	Vice/Virtue	Man/Woman	Animal (Note: The trumps of the contemporary da Tortona deck also feature animals.)	Caption and imagery
(0)	Folly	Fool	donkey	Also depicts The World; See 1 Corinthians 1:20–21
1	Idleness	Sardanapalus (Note: The king of Assyria and the queen of the Amazons, their consecutive trumps symbolizing opposite concepts. The contemporary da Tortona deck features a royal couple at the same location, as does Tarocco Siciliano on the next position (II and III), while all other non-Belgian tarots contain two such pairs.)	marmot	See Ashurbanipal
2	Fatigue (Note: Double entendre, meaning both effort and exhaustion.)	Hippolyta	ants	Depicted as an Amazon
3	Desire	Actaeon (Note: Explicitly mentioned in a chapter of da Tortona's contemporary treatise, accompanying the trump depicting Diana.)	leopard	Head of a stag with antlers Dogs biting his feet Mentions Diana (Note: Goddess of The Moon, also found in the contemporary da Tortona deck, the accompanying chapter of his treatise explicitly referencing Actaeon's story. Another Roman goddess, Juno, occupies the previous position in Swiss Tarot, Tarot de Besançon, and the aforementioned da Tortona pack.)
4	Reason	Laura	bees	Also depicts Cupid (Note: The Lovers, employing similar imagery, occupies the next two positions in all other tarots, save for Tarocco Siciliano.) and a white ermine (Note: A symbol of purity and chastity. Temperance, employing similar symbolism, occupies a nearby position (VI) in Type B tarots, according to Michael Dummett's classification.)
5	Secrecy	Antiochus I	ostrich	Mentions Stratonice I
6	Grace	Graces	phoenix (Note: The contemporary da Tortona deck also features a phoenix on the same position.)	
7	Disdain	Herod I (Note: The contemporary Sola Busca tarot features another infamously cruel tyrant, Nero, on the next position.)	bear	Mentions Mariamne I
8	Patience	Psyche	grey horse	See Cupid and Psyche (Note: The Lovers, employing similar imagery, occupies the same position in Tarocco Siciliano and two Type B tarots, according to Michael Dummett's classification.)
9	Error	Jacob (Note: Portrayed holding a shepherd's crook, with a sheep dog nearby, guarding his flock from potential predators. In the contemporary Visconti-Sforza Tarot, a trump occupying the same or XI^{th} position (Note: Depending on whether its trump order is of Type B or Type C, according to Michael Dummett's classification.) depicts a man swinging a bat at a lion, wildlife featured on non-Italian renditions of Strength. (Note: Strength and The Wheel occupy adjacent positions in all other tarots, save for Minchiate and Tarocco Siciliano.))	sheep	Also depicts a dog collar Mentions Leah, Rachel, Laban
10	Perseverance	Penelope	swallows	Also depicts a ship (Note: Seafaring trumps occupying consecutive positions. Found at a similar location (XIV) in Tarocco Siciliano.) and a warp-weighted loom. (Note: An alternate weaving tool, the spinning wheel, spread through Europe over the previous two centuries. The Wheel, employing similar imagery, occupies the same or adjacent position in all tarots.); See Homer's Odyssey.
11	Doubt	Aegeus	(lost text)	Mentions Theseus and his ship.
12	Faithfulness	Sophonisba	(lost text)	Mentions Roman triumphs (Note: Revived as the trionfo during the Renaissance, which also witnessed the emergence of the trionfi, a medieval precursor to the tarot, both public processions featuring a horse-driven carriage as their centerpiece. The Chariot, employing similar imagery, occupies a nearby position (IX or X) in the Minchiate and Tarocco Siciliano.) and Masinissa. See Second Punic War
13	Deceit (Note: The Hanged Man, labelled The Traitor in Italian versions of the game, occupies the previous two positions in all other tarots.)	Nessus (Note: A centaur. Death, employing similar imagery, occupies the same position in all tarots.)	(lost text)	Mentions the shirt of Nessus, Deianira, (Note: Both killed their respective husbands. Their trumps occupy consecutive positions.) Heracles, Hercules (Note: The trump symbolizing the killing of Hercules, found at the same location in the contemporary da Tortona deck. Death occupies the same position in all tarots. The next pair of odd-numbered trumps mark the demise of two illustrious members of ancient Rome's first triumvirate.)
14	Wisdom	Hypermnestra (Note: Her uncle is featured on a jack card.)	(lost text)	See Danaus, Danaides (Note: Temperance, employing similar imagery, occupies the same position in non-Italian tarots.)
15	Fall (Note: Double entendre, meaning both downfall and occurrence.)	Pompey (Note: Also mentioned on a knight card.)	(lost text)	Mentions the Wheel of Fortune
16	Modesty	Aemilia Tertia	(lost text)	Mentions Scipio Africanus
17	Danger	Caesar (Note: The king of diamonds in French-suited playing cards.)	Cretan bull (Note: Cretan-themed trumps occupying consecutive positions.)	Depicts the Ides of March; Mentions Sulla
18	Experience	Rhea	eagle of Zeus (Note: Found on a similar position (XX) in Tarocco Siciliano.)	Also depicts Jupiter, (Note: The Greek-Roman thunder god. The Tower, occupying a nearby position (XV or XVI) in all other versions, employs similar imagery in most non-Italian decks, save for Viéville, being labelled The Lightning in Belgian Tarot and Tarocco Bolognese.) Zeus, Mount Ida (Note: The Tower, employing similar imagery, occupies a nearby position (XV or XVI) in all other tarots.) of Crete, Psychro, the Korybantes. See Cronus. (Note: Often conflated with each other. Their trumps occupy consecutive positions.)
19	Time	Nestor of Pylos	longhorn stag (Note: Depicted on Florentine renditions of The Hermit.)	Depicted as The Hermit (Note: The contemporary Sola Busca tarot features a couple of Hermit-like trumps on the previous two positions.) (Note: Strength and The Hermit are two positions apart in all other tarots, save for Minchiate and Tarocco Siciliano.); See Chronos
20	Oblivion	Dido	lynx	Depicts Lethe
21	Strength	Lucretia	lion (Note: Depicted on non-Italian renditions of Strength.)	

== Legacy ==
Boiardo's Orlando Innamorato enjoyed great popularity amongst his contemporaries, its unfinished state prompting a number of sequels by, amongst others, Nicolò degli Agostini, Raffaele Valcieco, and above all Ludovico Ariosto in his Orlando Furioso. But Pietro Bembo's reformation of the language in 1525, the rediscovery of Aristotle's Poetics in the 1530s, and the incipient Counter-Reformation in the 1540s all caused it to fall from favour amongst critics and writers, including Torquato Tasso, who found it lacking on linguistic, theoretical, and moral grounds. Gradually, Boiardo's original version was supplanted by Francesco Berni's rifacimento (1542), a recasting of the poem in literary Tuscan, and by Lodovico Domenichi's contemporary revision, the publication of which (1544), significantly, coincided with the last edition of Boiardo to appear in the Renaissance in the original text.

Following centuries of neglect, the rediscovery of Boiardo took place in England during the Romantic period. Starting in 1830 Anthony Panizzi, the expatriate Italian professor later to become librarian of the British Museum, produced a historic combined edition of Boiardo's Orlando Innamorato and Ariosto's Orlando Furioso. This marked both the restoration of the Innamorato's original text and the beginning of modern Boiardo criticism.

Described by the critic Carlo Dionisotti as "the most misunderstood poet in Italian literature", and for a long time overshadowed by Ariosto, Boiardo has since emerged as a significant poet of the Renaissance, because his work showed more pluralism than other Renaissance writers, challenging the binary opposition between Christianity and Islam. He also was the first poet to use a combination of Latin and vernacular Northern Italian language. As a result of this modern critical appreciation he now seems set to rival Ariosto's long-standing supremacy.

== Translations ==
The first translation of Boiardo into English was Robert Tofte's Orlando Inamorato: The Three First Bookes (1598), in reality the first three cantos of book 1 in Domenichi's version. The Italian text was known to Spenser and Milton, but it was not until the 19th century that other partial translations were attempted, by Richard Wharton (1804), William Stewart Rose (1823), and Leigh Hunt (1846).

== Bibliography ==
- Forti, Fiorenzo (1969). "BOIARDO, Matteo Maria". Dizionario Biografico degli Italiani (in Italian). Vol. 11: Boccadibue–Bonetti. Rome: Institute of the Italian Encyclopaedia. ISBN 978-88-12-00032-6.
- "Matteo Maria Boiardo". Encyclopedia of World Biography. Vol. 2. Detroit: Gale Research. 1998.
- Dorigatti, Marco (2002). "Boiardo, Matteo Maria". The Oxford Companion to Italian Literature. Oxford: Oxford University Press.
