= List of presidents of the Province of Bologna =

President of the Province of Bologna
- Presidente della Provincia di Bologna
- Inaugural holder: Giuseppe Bacchelli
- Formation: 1889
- Final holder: Beatrice Draghetti
- Abolished: 2014
- Superseded by: Metropolitan mayor of Bologna

The president of the Province of Bologna was the head of the provincial administration of Bologna, a local government authority in Emilia-Romagna, Italy.

== History ==
The office of president of the Province of Bologna was established in 1889, initially within the Provincial Deputation. Before that date, the Deputation was headed by the prefect. During the Fascist period (1926–1945), the province was governed by appointed officials, including commissioners and presidents of the Rectorate.

After World War II, the office was restored and gradually redefined within the Italian Republic, first with indirect election by the Provincial Council and, from 1993, with direct popular election.

The province was eventually replaced in 2015 by the Metropolitan City of Bologna.

== List ==
=== Presidents of the Provincial Deputation (1889–1928) ===
No.	Portrait	Name	Term of office		Party
No.	Portrait	Name	Start	End	Party
1		Giuseppe Bacchelli	1889	1898	
2		Giuseppe Pedrazzi	1899	1905	
(1)		Giuseppe Bacchelli	1905	1906	
3		Diomede De Sirronisano	1906	1907	
4		Pietro Baldini	1907	1908	
5		Antonio Carranti	1908	1913	
6		Luigi Guadagnini	1914	?	
		Umberto Turchi	1923	1928	National Fascist Party

=== Presidents of the Provincial Rectorate (1928–1945) ===
No.	Portrait	Name	Term of office		Party
No.	Portrait	Name	Start	End	Party
1		Umberto Turchi	1928	?	National Fascist Party

=== Presidents of the Provincial Deputation (1945–1951) ===
No.	Portrait	Name	Term of office		Party
No.	Portrait	Name	Start	End	Party
1		Giorgio Melloni	14 June 1945	18 June 1951	Christian Democracy

=== Presidents of the Province (1951–2014) ===
No.	Portrait	Name	Term of office		Party
No.	Portrait	Name	Start	End	Party
1		Roberto Vighi	18 June 1951	21 June 1956	Italian Socialist Party
1		Roberto Vighi	21 June 1956	28 November 1960	Italian Socialist Party
1		Roberto Vighi	28 November 1960	29 January 1965	Italian Socialist Party
1		Roberto Vighi	29 January 1965	30 July 1970	Italian Socialist Party of Proletarian Unity
2		Ilario Brini	30 July 1970	22 July 1975	Italian Socialist Party
3		Ghino Rimondini	22 July 1975	28 July 1980	Italian Socialist Party
4		Mario Corsini	28 July 1980	29 July 1985	Italian Socialist Party
5		Mauro Zani	29 July 1985	9 February 1988	Italian Communist Party
6		Giuseppe Petruzzelli	9 February 1988	16 July 1990	Italian Communist Party
7		Lamberto Cotti	16 July 1990	7 May 1995	Italian Socialist Party
8		Vittorio Prodi	15 May 1995	13 July 1999	Italian People's Party; Democracy is Freedom – The Daisy
8		Vittorio Prodi	13 July 1999	12 May 2004	Italian People's Party; Democracy is Freedom – The Daisy
9		Beatrice Draghetti	12 May 2004	8 June 2009	The Daisy; Democratic Party
9		Beatrice Draghetti	8 June 2009	31 December 2014	The Daisy; Democratic Party

== See also ==
- Mayor of Bologna
- Metropolitan City of Bologna

== Sources ==
- "Storia amministrativa dell'ente". Ministero dell'Interno.
- "Presidenti, giunte e consigli". Città metropolitana di Bologna.
- Menichini, Piera (2005). "I presidenti delle Province dall'Unità alla Grande guerra: repertorio analitico". Storia Amministrazione Costituzione (13): 233–234.
