= Giovanni Prodi =

Italian mathematician (1925–2010)

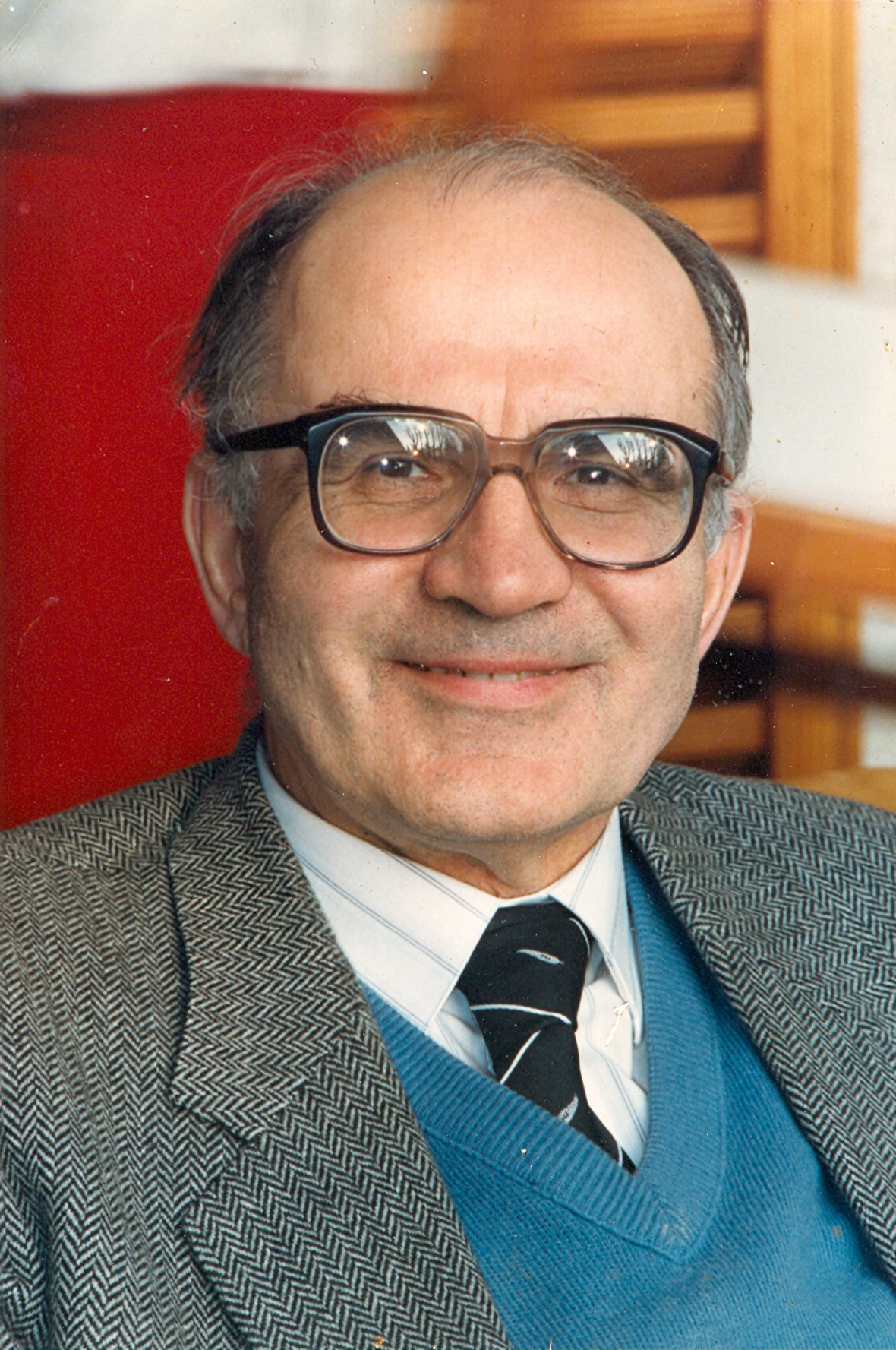
- Born: 28 July 1925; Scandiano, Emilia-Romagna, Italy
- Died: 29 January 2010 (aged 84); Pisa, Italy
- Education: University of Parma
- Scientific career
- Workplaces: University of Milan; University of Pisa

Giovanni Prodi (28 July 1925 – 29 January 2010) was an Italian mathematician, also known for many activities concerning the teaching of mathematics.

There is a professorship of mathematics at the University of Würzburg named in his honour, created in 2006.

== Early life ==
His father, Mario Prodi, was an engineer and his mother, Enrica, a primary school teacher. He was the eldest among 9 siblings, which included former Italian Prime Minister Romano Prodi, member of the European Parliament Vittorio Prodi, and the medical scientist Giorgio Prodi. Prodi studied at the Liceo Ariosto in Reggio nell'Emilia, which was the main city of the region. Following that, he entered the University of Parma to study mathematics in 1943 amid World War II hostilities.

== Military service ==
He was drafted into the National Republican Army, reluctantly because of the threat of harm to his family. He was sent to Germany as part of an Italian camp and trained there as a telephonist. In 1944, he deserted the Army along with several comrades and returned to Parma, where he was taken prisoner by the advancing Allies. He was detained at Coltano, near Pisa, where he remained for 5 months before being released.

== Academia ==
After his military service ended, Prodi returned to the University of Parma to continue his university studies. Upon graduation, he joined the University of Milan as an assistant professor, where he worked with Giovanni Ricci. He held the chair of mathematical analysis at the University of Trieste from 1956 to 1963, and then at the University of Pisa.

He was also interested in improving mathematics education, proposing radical new ideas on mathematical teaching, emphasising on probability theory, constructive mathematics and promoting algorithmic thinking and problem solving.

== Death ==
After several years of deteriorating health due to Parkinson's disease, he died as a result of a cardiac arrest in 2010.
