= Antonio Carranti =

Italian politician (1872–1930)

Podestà of Bologna
- In office 22 September 1929 – 24 April 1930
- Preceded by: Leandro Arpinati
- Succeeded by: Giovanni Battista Berardi

President of the Province of Bologna
- In office 1908–1913
- Preceded by: Pietro Baldini
- Succeeded by: Luigi Guadagnini

Mayor of Imola
- In office 1898–1901

Personal details
- Born: 6 March 1872 Imola, Province of Bologna, Kingdom of Italy
- Died: 24 April 1930 (aged 58) Bologna, Kingdom of Italy
- Party: National Fascist Party
- Education: University of Bologna
- Profession: Lawyer

Antonio Carranti (6 March 1872 – 24 April 1930) was an Italian lawyer and politician. He served as mayor of Imola from 1898 to 1901 and as president of the Province of Bologna from 1908 to 1913.

He later joined the National Fascist Party, and served as deputy podestà of Bologna from 1927. On 22 September 1929, Carranti succeeded Leandro Arpinati as podestà. He remained in office until his sudden death on 24 April 1930.
