= Pastoralia (Boiardo) =

Start of the Pastoralia in the manuscript Barberini Latin 1879

Pastoralia is a collection of ten Latin eclogues written by Matteo Boiardo in 1463–1464. It is one of his early works. Each eclogue has 100 lines.

The Pastoralia must be distinguished from Boiardo's Pastorale (or Pastorali), a collection of ten vernacular epigrams composed in the 1480s.

== Contents ==
The ten poems are:

1. Syringa
2. Phyliroe
3. Eripoemenon
4. Comiti Vasilicomantia
5. Silva
6. Herodia
7. Buccula
8. Philicodiae
9. Hercules
10. Orpheus

Written at Ferrara, the Pastoralia is a homage to Vergil's Bucolica. In poems I, IV, VI, IX and X, Boiardo praises Duke Borso d'Este and his brother, Ercole, for preserving the peace. Unlike his earlier poems praising the Estes, the Pastoralia is not so excessive in its praise. In technique, it is "an inspired advance". Poems II, III, V, VII and VIII are about love.

Giovanni Ponte argued in 1961 that the Pastoralia was the first expression of Boiardo's own poetic voice and not a mere rhetorical exercise. Jo Ann Cavallo considers the eighth eclogue on nature the most successful. Edmund Gardner also considered it "Boiardo's first attempts to win the Muses." Sukanta Chaudhuri considers that, as Boiardo was writing "in a dispensation geared to the epic", he worked in "other modes and forms" than the pastoral into his Pastoralia. For example, Borso and Ercole are presented as "that most contrary figure, the warrior-shepherd, totally subverting the root principle of pastoral".

== Publication history ==
There are two surviving versions of the text. The one approved by Boiardo for publication survives in two manuscripts, one containing autograph notes. This version was printed at Reggio nell'Emilia in 1500 by Bartolomeo Crotti. An abridged version appeared in the 17th century.

A critical edition of the Pastoralia was published by Angelo Solerti in 1894. Stefano Carrai has also edited the Pastoralia and translated it into Italian.
