= Romano Prodi =

Italian politician (born 1939)

Romano Prodi OMRI
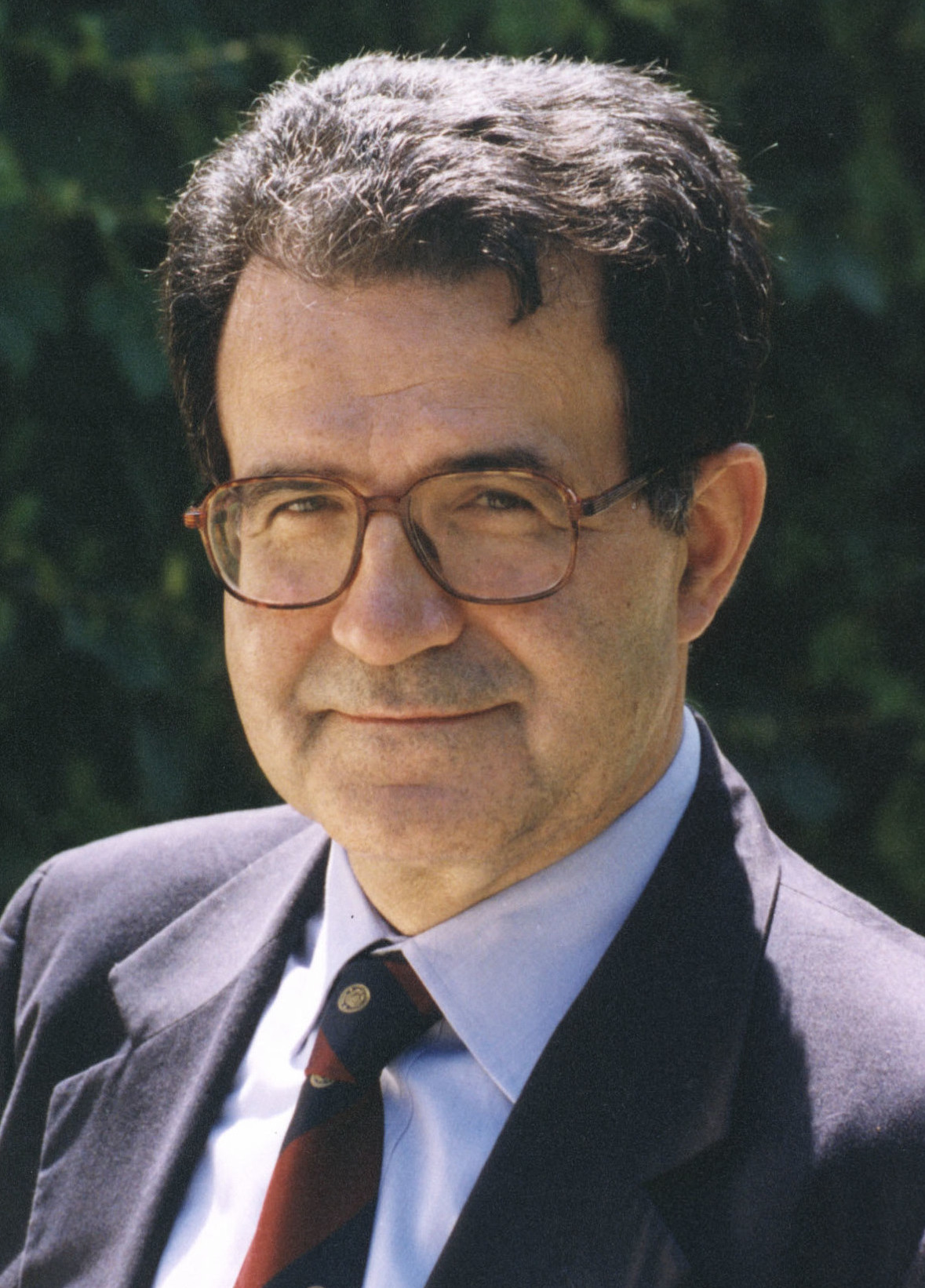
- Official portrait, 1999

President of the European Commission
- In office 16 September 1999 – 21 November 2004
- Vice President: Neil Kinnock
- Preceded by: Manuel Marín
- Succeeded by: José Manuel Barroso

Prime Minister of Italy
- In office 17 May 2006 – 8 May 2008
- President: Giorgio Napolitano
- Deputy: Massimo D'Alema; Francesco Rutelli
- Preceded by: Silvio Berlusconi
- Succeeded by: Silvio Berlusconi
- In office 18 May 1996 – 21 October 1998
- President: Oscar Luigi Scalfaro
- Deputy: Walter Veltroni
- Preceded by: Lamberto Dini
- Succeeded by: Massimo D'Alema

President of the Democratic Party
- In office 14 October 2007 – 16 April 2008
- Secretary: Walter Veltroni
- Preceded by: Office Created
- Succeeded by: Rosy Bindi

Minister of Industry, Commerce and Crafts
- In office 25 November 1978 – 21 March 1979
- Prime Minister: Giulio Andreotti
- Preceded by: Carlo Donat-Cattin
- Succeeded by: Franco Nicolazzi

Member of the Chamber of Deputies
- In office 28 April 2006 – 28 April 2008
- Constituency: Emilia-Romagna
- In office 9 May 1996 – 16 September 1999
- Constituency: Bologna

Personal details
- Born: Romano Antonio Prodi; 9 August 1939 (age 87) Scandiano, Italy
- Party: Christian Democracy (1963–1994); Italian People's Party (1994–1996); Independent (1996–1999, 2002–2007; since 2013); The Democrats (1999–2002); Democratic Party (2007–2013)
- Other political affiliations: The Olive Tree (1995–2007); The Union (2004–2007)
- Spouse: Flavia Franzoni (m. 1969; died 2023)
- Children: 2
- Education: Università Cattolica del Sacro Cuore; London School of Economics
- Romano Prodi's voice Prodi speaking on the 2003 Istanbul bombings Recorded 20 November 2003

Romano Prodi (Italian: [roˈmaːno ˈprɔːdi]; born 9 August 1939) is an Italian politician who served as President of the European Commission from 1999 to 2004 and twice as Prime Minister of Italy, from 1996 to 1998, and again from 2006 to 2008. Prodi is considered the founder of the Italian centre-left and one of the most prominent figures of the Second Republic. He is often nicknamed Il Professore ("The Professor") because of his academic reputation.

A former professor of economics and international advisor to Goldman Sachs, Prodi ran as lead candidate of The Olive Tree coalition, winning the 1996 election and serving as prime minister until losing a vote of confidence in 1998. He was subsequently appointed President of the European Commission in 1999, serving until 2004. Following the victory of his new coalition, The Union, over the House of Freedoms led by Silvio Berlusconi, at the 2006 election, Prodi became prime minister a second time. On 24 January 2008, he lost a vote of confidence in the Senate and consequently tendered his resignation as prime minister to President Giorgio Napolitano; he continued in office for almost four months for routine business until early elections were held and a new government was formed. Prodi was the first left-leaning candidate to finish first in an Italian general election since 1921.

In 2007, Prodi became the founding president of the Democratic Party. In 2008, United Nations Secretary-General Ban Ki-moon selected Prodi as president of the African Union–United Nations peacekeeping panel. Since 2021, he is serving as the United Nations Special Envoy for the Sahel.

== Early life and family ==
Prodi was born in Scandiano, near Reggio Emilia, in 1939; he is the eighth of nine children. His father, Mario Prodi, was an engineer who grew up in a peasant family, and his mother, Enrichetta, was an elementary school teacher. Most of the brothers are, or have been, university professors, among them Giovanni Prodi (professor of mathematical analysis), Vittorio Prodi (professor of physics and member of the European Parliament), Paolo Prodi (professor of modern history), Franco Prodi (professor of atmospheric physics), and Giorgio Prodi (professor of general pathology).

In 1969, Prodi married Flavia Franzoni, at that time a student, who later became an economist and university professor. The couple was married by Camillo Ruini, now a well-known cardinal. They have two sons, Giorgio and Antonio. His wife, Flavia, died on 13 June 2023 at the age of 76.

== Academic career ==
After completing his secondary education at the Liceo Ludovico Ariosto in Reggio Emilia, Prodi graduated in law at Milan's Università Cattolica in 1961 with a thesis on the role of protectionism in the development of Italian industry. He then carried out postgraduate studies at the London School of Economics.

Prodi has received almost 20 honorary degrees from institutions in Italy and from the rest of Europe, North America, Asia, and Africa.

== Early political career ==
=== Ministry of Industry and Aldo Moro's kidnapping ===
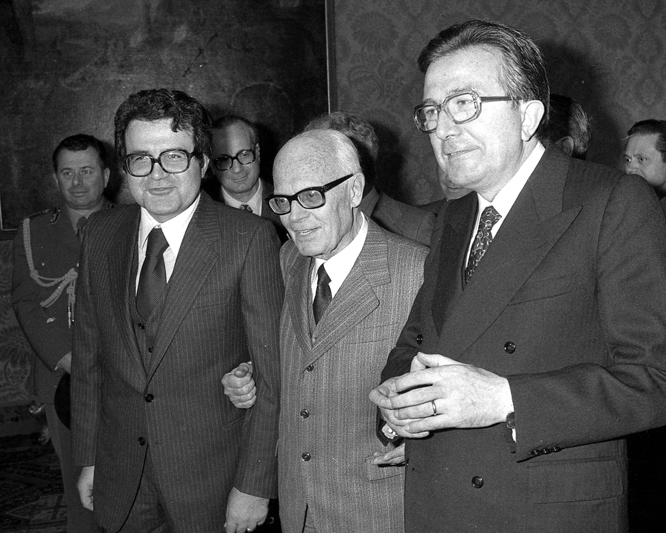
Prodi with Sandro Pertini and Giulio Andreotti in 1978

On 25 November 1978, Prodi was appointed Minister of Industry, Commerce, and Crafts in the government of the Christian Democracy leader Giulio Andreotti. Even if he was a party member, Prodi was widely considered a technical minister. As minister, he promoted a law, known as Prodi law, which aimed a regulating of the extraordinary state administration procedure for the rescue of large enterprises in crisis.

On 2 April 1978, Prodi and other teachers at the University of Bologna passed on a tip-off that revealed the whereabouts of the safe house where the kidnapped Aldo Moro, the former prime minister, was being held captive by the Red Brigades. Prodi stated that he had been given this tip-off by the founders of Christian Democracy, contacted from beyond the grave via a séance and a Ouija board. Whilst during this supposed séance Prodi thought Gradoli referred to a town on the outskirts of Rome, it probably referred to the Roman address of a Red Brigades safe house, located at no. 96, Via Gradoli.

The information was trusted, and a police group made an armed blitz in the town of Gradoli, 80 km from Rome, on the following day, 6 April, although Moro was not found. The supernatural element was generally not overlooked during the investigations. For example, the Italian government had engaged a diviner, hoping that he would find Moro's location. The police made another fruitless blitz in Viterbo after an abbess declared that, during a vision, she had seen him there.

Prodi spoke to the Italian Parliament's commission about the case in 1981. In the notes of the Italian Parliament commission on terrorism, the séance is described as a fake, used to hide the true source of the information. In 1997, Andreotti declared that the information came from the Bologna section of Autonomia Operaia, a far-left organization with some ties with the Red Brigades, and that Francesco Cossiga also knew the true source. Judge Ferdinando Imposimato considered Andreotti's theory as possible but accused him of having kept information that could have been valuable in a trial about Moro's murder. Moro's widow later declared that she had repeatedly informed the police that a Via Gradoli existed in Rome, but the investigators did not consider it; some replied to her that the street did not appear in Rome's maps. This is confirmed by other Moro relatives but strongly denied by Cossiga, who served as Interior Minister during Moro's kidnapping.

=== Mitrokhin Commission ===
In the 1990s, the séance matter was reopened by the Italian Parliament's commission on terrorism. While Prodi (then Prime Minister) declared that he had no time for an interview, both Mario Baldassarri (senator and vice-minister in two Silvio Berlusconi cabinets) and Alberto Clò (Minister of Industry in Lamberto Dini's cabinet and owner of the house where the séance was performed) responded to the call; they confirmed the circumstances of the séance and that Gradoli had appeared in several sessions, even if the participants had changed. Later, other Italian members of the European Commission alleged that Prodi had invented this story to conceal the real source of the tip-off, which they believed to have originated somewhere among the far-left Italian political groups.

This issue came back again in 2005, when Prodi was accused of being "a KGB man" by Mario Scaramella. The allegations were rejected by Prodi. Former Federal Security Service (FSB) officer Alexander Litvinenko also said that FSB deputy chief Anatoly Trofimov "did not exactly say that Prodi was a KGB agent, because the KGB avoids using that word." The same accusation was raised in 2002 by the Mitrokhin Commission, which was closed in 2006 with a majority and a minority report, without reaching shared conclusions, and without any concrete evidence given to support the original allegations of KGB ties to Italian politicians contained in the Mitrokhin Archive. Led by the centre-right coalition majority, it was criticized as politically motivated, as it was focused mainly on allegations against opposition figures. 2006 saw the publication of telephone interceptions between the chairman of the Mitrokhin Commission, Forza Italia senator Paolo Guzzanti, and Scaramella. In the wiretaps, Guzzanti made it clear that the true intent of the Mitrokhin Commission was to support the hypothesis that Prodi would have been an agent financed or in any case manipulated by Moscow and the KGB. According to the opposition, which submitted its own minority report, this hypothesis was false, and the purpose of the commission was therefore to discredit him. In the wiretaps, Scaramella had the task of collecting testimonies from some ex-agents of the Soviet secret service refugees in Europe to support these accusations; he was later charged for calumny.

In November 2006, the new Italian Parliament with a centre-left coalition majority instituted a commission to investigate the Mitrokhin Commission for allegations that it was manipulated for political purposes. In a December 2006 interview given to the television program La storia siamo noi, colonel ex-KGB agent Oleg Gordievsky, whom Scaramella claimed as his source, confirmed the accusations made against Scaramella regarding the production of false material relating to Prodi and other Italian politicians, and underlined their lack of reliability. Despite this, those claims were further repeated by the UK Independence Party's Gerard Batten, the member of the European Parliament for London who stated that he was informed of this by Litvinenko, who was his constituent and former FSB operative. The 16 February 2018 indictment of Paul Manafort unsealed on 23 February, as part of the Mueller special counsel investigation, alleges that foreign politicians hypothesized to be Prodi and Alfred Gusenbauer took payments exceeding $2 million from Manafort to promote the case of his client, Viktor Yanukovich; both denied this and said their work was focused to get closer European Union–Ukraine relations.

== Business and administrative career ==
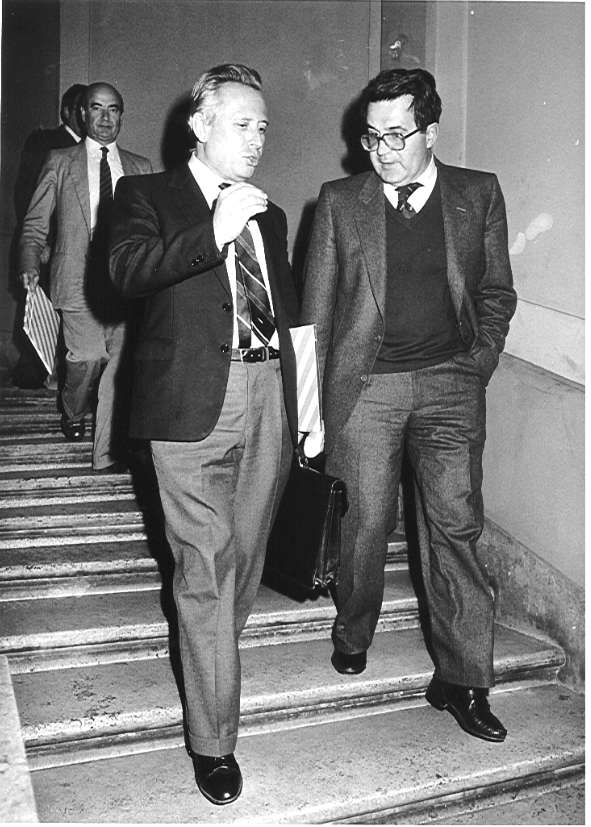
Prodi with Minister Luigi Granelli in 1985

After leaving his position in 1989, Prodi ran the Bologna based consulting company Analisi e Studi Economici, which he jointly owned along with his wife. Between 1990 and 1993 the company earned £1.4 million, most of which was paid by the investment bank Goldman Sachs.

=== Second term as IRI President ===
In 1993, Prodi was among the main candidates to become Prime Minister of Italy at the head of a technocratic government; instead, the governor of the Bank of Italy, Carlo Azeglio Ciampi, was chosen for this office by President Oscar Luigi Scalfaro.

In 1993–1994, Prodi was appointed president of the IRI again by Ciampi, where he oversaw extensive privatization of public assets. For his activities in this period, Prodi would later twice come under investigation – firstly for an alleged conflict of interest in relation to contracts awarded to his own economic research company in relation to the Italdel-Siemens merger, and secondly concerning the sale of the loss-making state-owned food conglomerate SME to the multinational Unilever, for which he had previously been a paid consultant.

Prodi's former employer, Goldman Sachs, was involved in both of the deals. In February 2007, the Italian Treasury Police raided the Milan office of Goldman Sachs, where they removed a file called "MTononi/memo-Prodi02.doc". They also obtained a letter to Siemens from the Frankfurt office of Goldman Sachs regarding the Italdel deal, which revealed that Prodi was made the Senior Advisor of Goldman Sachs International in Italy in March 1990. In November 1996, after Prodi had been elected prime minister, Rome prosecutor Guiseppa Geremia concluded that there was enough evidence to press charges against Prodi for conflict of interest in the Unilever deal. The case was, however, shut down within weeks by superiors, while Geremia was "exiled to Sardinia".

== First term as prime minister (1996–1998) ==
On 25 May 1994, Prodi went to Palazzo Chigi to announce his resignation as IRI president to the new prime minister Silvio Berlusconi; the resignation had been formalised on 31 May and became effective on 22 July.

On 11 August, Prodi announced to the Gazzetta di Reggio of his intent to enter politics. A few months earlier, Prodi had rejected a proposal from the Italian People's Party (PPI) to run for the 1994 European election.

=== The Olive Tree and 1996 election ===
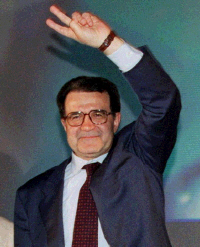
Prodi during the electoral campaign in 1996

On 13 February 1995, Prodi, along with his close friend Arturo Parisi, founded his political alliance The Olive Tree. Prodi's aim was to build a centre-left coalition composed of centrist and leftist parties, opposed to the centre-right alliance led by Silvio Berlusconi, who resigned from the office of prime minister a few weeks before, when Lega Nord withdrew its support for the government. The movement was immediately supported by Mariotto Segni, leader of the centrist Segni Pact; after a few weeks, the post-communist Democratic Party of the Left of Massimo D'Alema, the PPI and the Federation of the Greens also joined the Olive Tree coalition.

On 19 February 1996, the outgoing Prime Minister Lamberto Dini announced that he would run in the election with a new party called Italian Renewal, allied with Prodi's Olive Tree rather than Berlusconi's Pole for Freedoms. Shortly after, Berlusconi claimed that Dini "copied his electoral programme".

On election day, Prodi's Olive Tree coalition won over Berlusconi's Pole for Freedoms, becoming the first coalition composed of a post-communist party to win a general election since the Second World War. In the Senate, The Olive Tree obtained the majority; in the Chamber, it required the external support of the Communist Refoundation Party. On 17 May 1996, Prodi received from President Oscar Luigi Scalfaro the task of forming a new government. He ultimately formed a 23-member cabinet that included 16 PDS ministers (including Deputy Prime Minister Walter Veltroni) and 10 PDS junior ministers–the first (former) Communists to take part in government in half a century.

=== Policies ===
Prodi's economic programme consisted of continuing the past governments' work of restoration of the country's economic health, in order to pursue the then seemingly unreachable goal of leading the country within the strict European Monetary System parameters in order to allow the country to join the Euro currency. He succeeded in this in little more than six months.

During his first premiership, Prodi faced the 1997 Albanian civil unrest; his government proposed the so-called Operation Alba ("Sunrise"), a multinational peacekeeping force sent to Albania in 1997 and led by Italy. It was intended to help the Albanian government restore law and order in their troubled country after the 1997 rebellion in Albania.

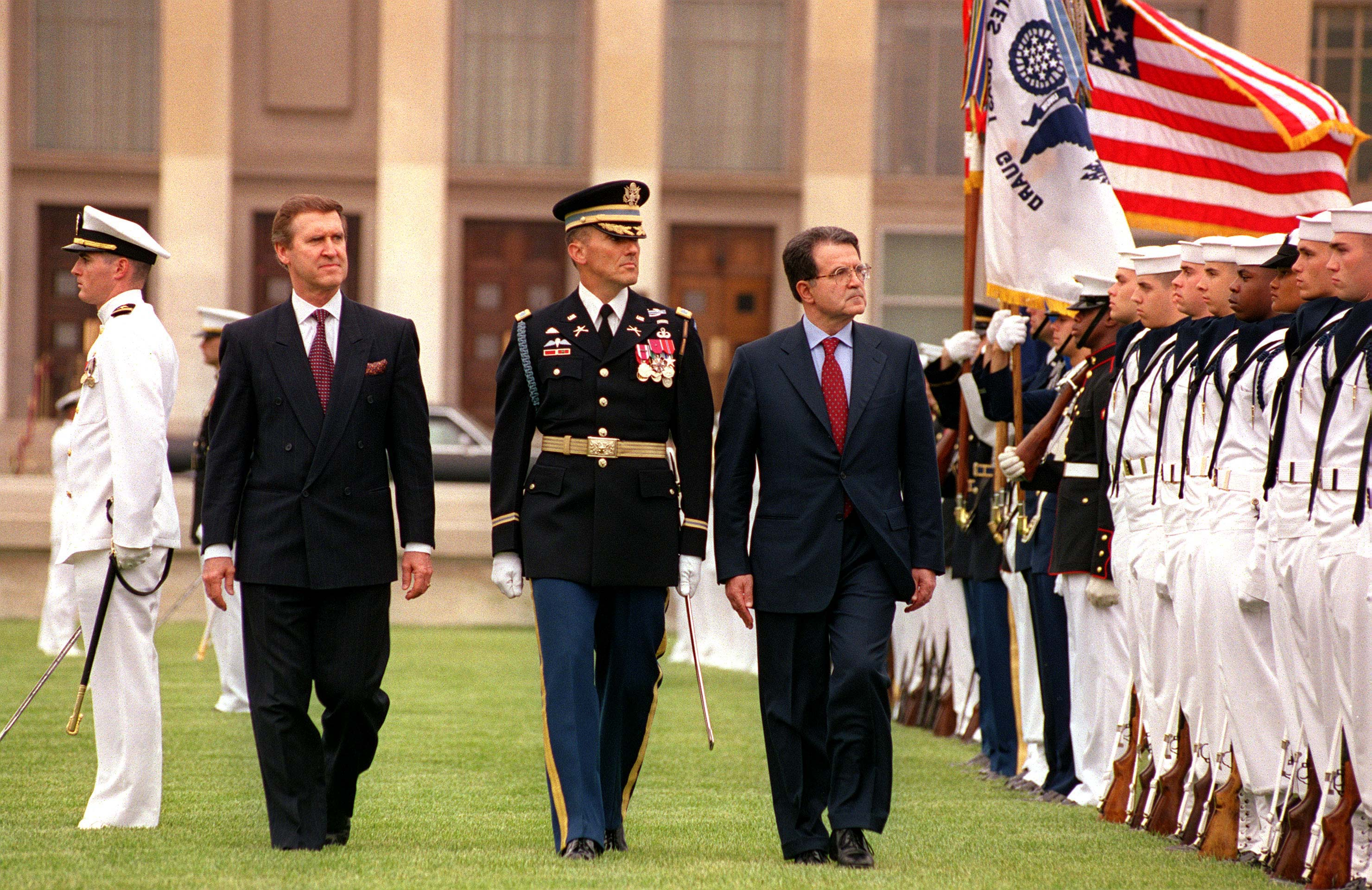
Prodi with United States Secretary of Defence William Cohen

Following the degenerating loss of administrative control by the Government in the first days of March 1997, culminating in the desertion of most Police and multiple Republican Guard and Army units, leaving their armouries open to the inevitable looting which soon followed, several Nations autonomously helped evacuate their Nationals in Operation Silver Wake and Operation Libelle.

The UN Security Council therefore agreed to the United Nations Security Council Resolution 1101 as a stop-gap operation to manage this and buy time, laying the foundations for a planned reconstruction, which after six weeks of debate, fell to the Western European Union, creating the Multinational Albanian Police Element around a command structure of Italian Carabinieri, which actually undertook the work of Judicial and Police reconstruction, extending into the elimination of the economic causes of the crisis.

The Italian 3rd Army Corps assumed responsibility for the stop-gap mission as Operation Alba, the first multinational Italian-led Mission since World War II. Eleven contributing European Nations brought humanitarian aid to a country that was in a dramatic economic and political situation. In 1997, Prodi declared that "the problem of the safety of the country seems to be no longer one of external safety, but an internal one: the safety of citizens in their everyday life".

=== Resignation ===
Prodi's government fell in 1998 when the Communist Refoundation Party withdrew its external support. This led to the formation of a new government led by Massimo D'Alema as prime minister. There are those who claim that D'Alema, along with People's Party leader Franco Marini, deliberately engineered the collapse of the Prodi government to become prime minister himself. As the result of a vote of no confidence in Prodi's government, D'Alema's nomination was passed by a single vote. This was the first occasion in the history of the Italian Republic on which a vote of no confidence had ever been called; the Republic's previous governments had been brought down by a majority "no" vote on some crucially important piece of legislation (such as the budget).

== President of the European Commission (1999–2004) ==
In September 1999 Prodi, a strong supporter of European Integration, became President of the European Commission, thanks to the support of both the conservative European People's Party, the social-democratic Party of European Socialists and the centrist Alliance of Liberals and Democrats for Europe Party in the European Parliament.

His commission took office on 13 September 1999 following the scandal and subsequent resignation of the Santer Commission, which had damaged the reputation of the institution. It took over from the interim Marín Commission. The College consisted of 20 Commissioners, which grew to 30 following the Enlargement of the European Union in 2004. It was the last commission to see two members allocated to the larger member states. This commission (the 10th) saw an increase in power and influence following the Amsterdam Treaty. Some in the media described President Prodi as being the first "Prime Minister of the European Union".

=== Amsterdam Treaty ===
It was during Prodi's presidency, in 2002, that 11 EU member states ditched their national currencies and adopted the euro as their common currency. This commission (the 10th) saw an increase in power and influence following the Amsterdam Treaty.

The treaty was the result of long negotiations which began in Messina, Sicily, on 2 June 1995, nearly forty years after the signing of the Treaty of Rome, and reached completion in Amsterdam on 18 June 1997. Following the formal signing of the Treaty on 2 October 1997, the member states engaged in an equally long and complex ratification process. The European Parliament endorsed the treaty on 19 November 1997, and after two referendums and 13 decisions by parliaments, the member states finally concluded the procedure. Under this treaty the member states agreed to devolve certain powers from national governments to the European Parliament across diverse areas, including legislating on immigration, adopting civil and criminal laws, and enacting foreign and security policy (CFSP), as well as implementing institutional changes for expansion as new member nations join the EU.

The increased power of the Commission President led to some media describing President Prodi as the first "Prime Minister of the European Union".

=== Nice Treaty ===
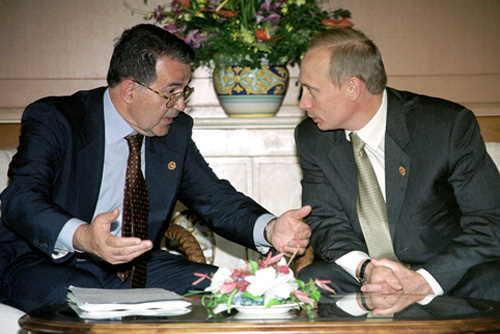
Prodi with Russian President Vladimir Putin in 2000

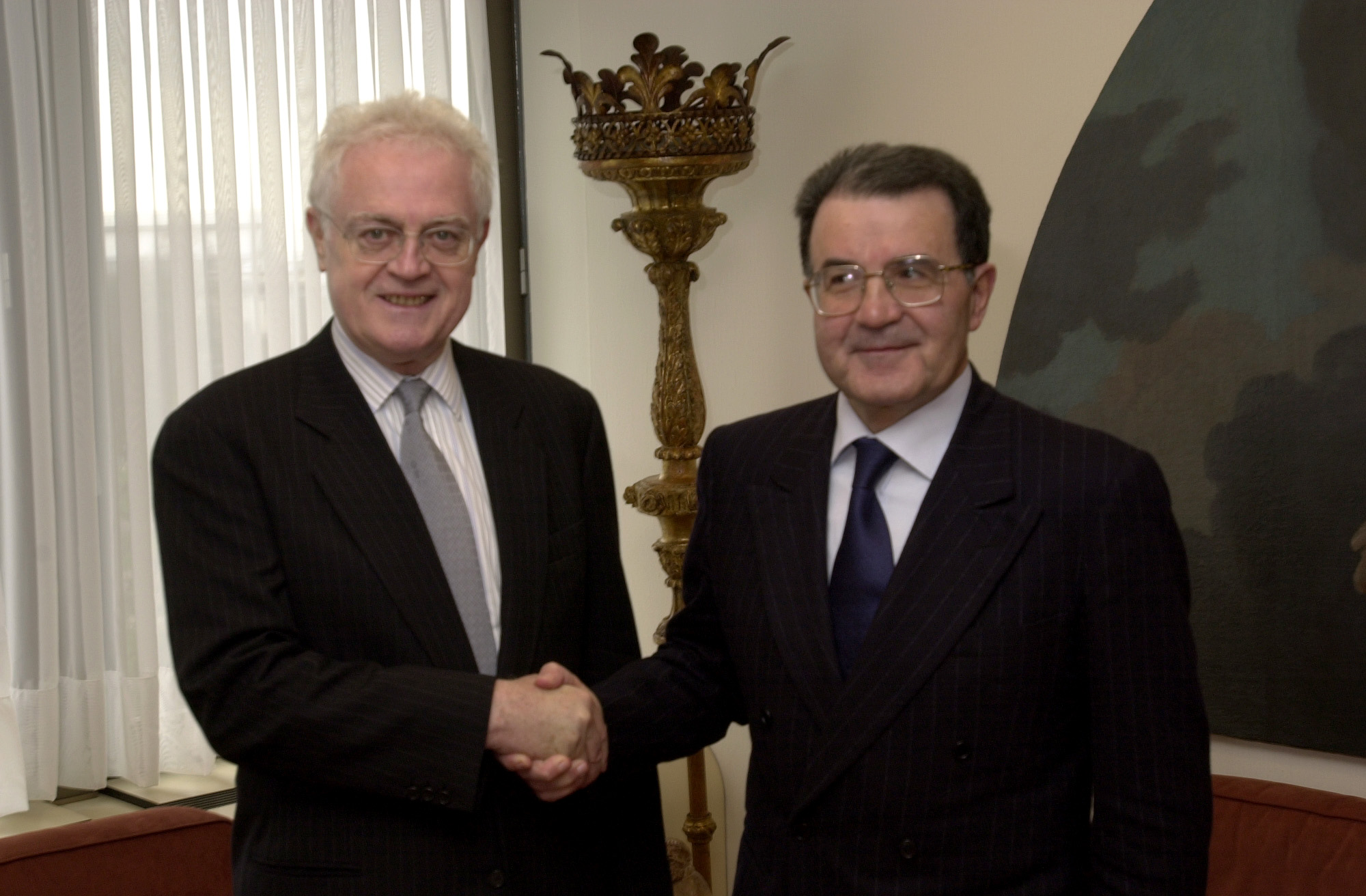
Prodi with French Prime Minister Lionel Jospin in 2001

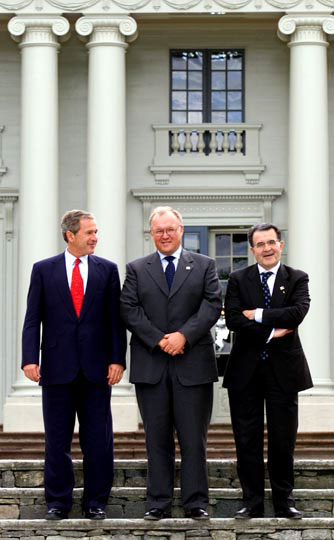
Prodi with U.S. President George W. Bush and Swedish Prime Minister Göran Persson with in the EU–US Summit in Gothenburg, Sweden in 2001

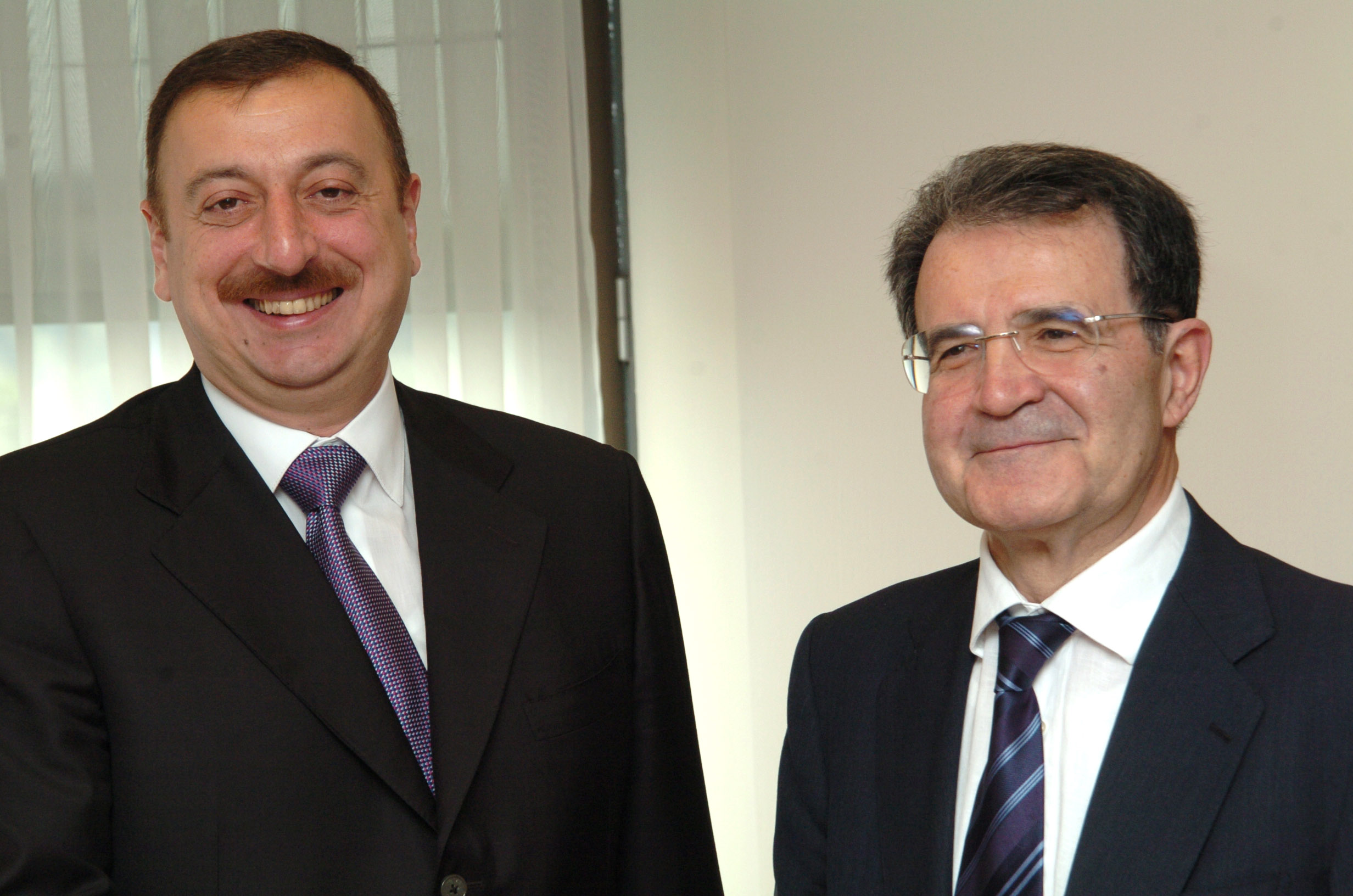
Prodi with Azerbaijani President Ilham Aliyev in 2004

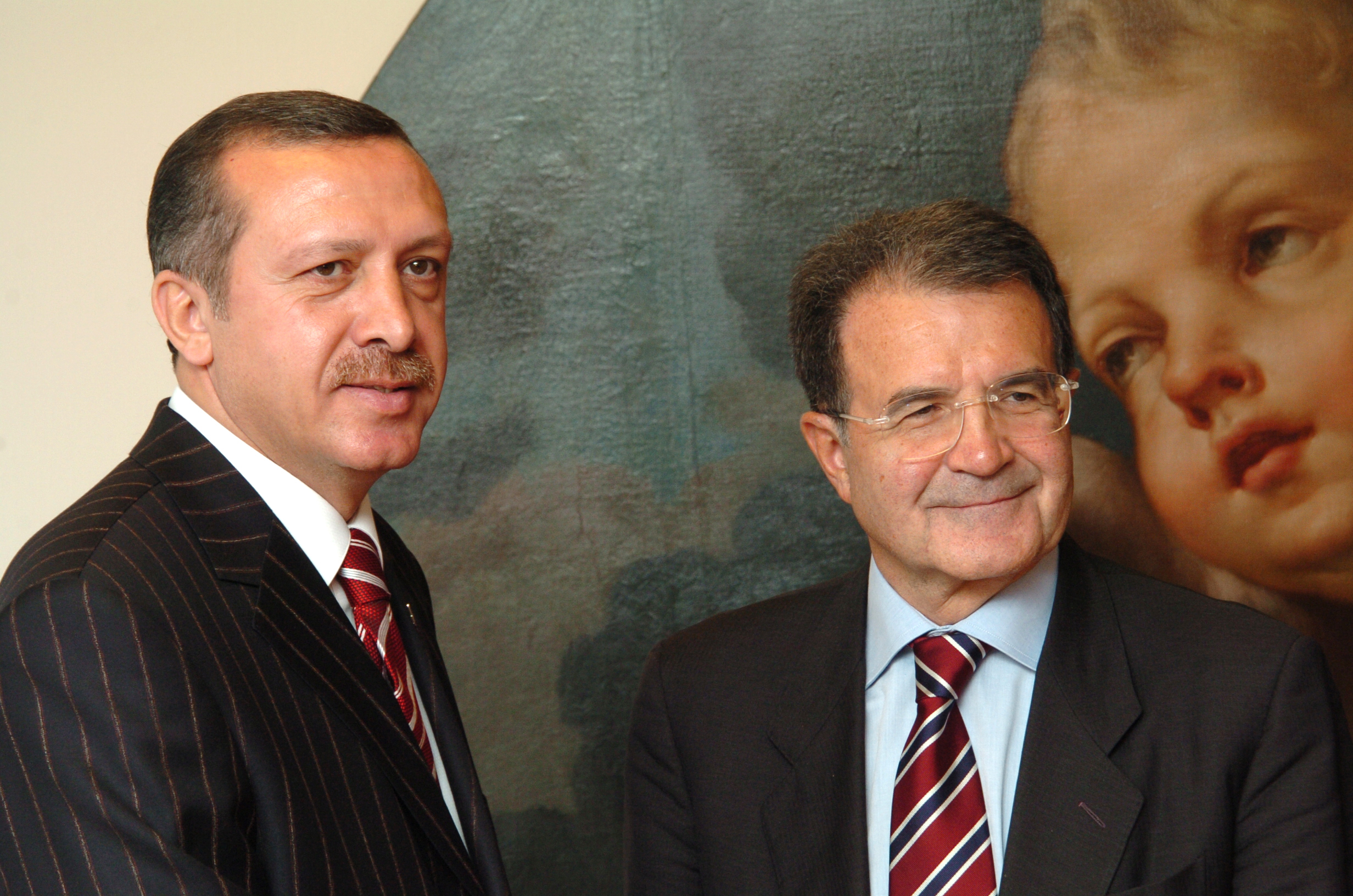
Prodi with Turkish Prime Minister Recep Tayyip Erdoğan in 2004

As well as the enlargement and the Amsterdam Treaty, the Prodi Commission also saw the signing and enforcement of the Treaty of Nice as well as the conclusion and signing of the European Constitution, in which he introduced the "Convention method" of negotiation. The treaty was signed by European leaders on 26 February 2001 and came into force on 1 February 2003.

It amended the Maastricht Treaty (or the Treaty on European Union) and the Treaty of Rome (or the Treaty establishing the European Community which, before the Maastricht Treaty, was the Treaty establishing the European Economic Community). The Treaty of Nice reformed the institutional structure of the European Union to withstand eastward expansion, a task which was originally intended to have been done by the Amsterdam Treaty but failed to be addressed at the time. The entry into force of the treaty was in doubt for a time after its initial rejection by Irish voters in a referendum in June 2001. This referendum result was reversed in a subsequent referendum held a little over a year later.

=== 2004 enlargement and end of the mandate ===
In 2004, his last year as Commission President, the European Union was enlarged to admit several more member nations, most formerly part of the Soviet bloc. It was the largest single expansion of the European Union (EU), in terms of territory, number of states, and population to date; however, it was not the largest in terms of gross domestic product. It occurred on 1 May 2004.

The simultaneous accessions concerned the following countries (sometimes referred to as the "A10" countries): Cyprus, the Czech Republic, Estonia, Hungary, Latvia, Lithuania, Malta, Poland, Slovakia, and Slovenia. Seven of these were part of the former Eastern Bloc (of which three were from the former Soviet Union and four were and still are members of the Central European alliance Visegrád Group), one of the former Yugoslavia (together sometimes referred to as the "A8" countries), and the remaining two were Mediterranean islands and former British colonies.

Part of the same wave was the 2007 enlargement of the European Union that saw the accession of Bulgaria and Romania, who were unable to join in 2004, but, according to the Commission, constitute part of the fifth enlargement. The commission was due to leave office on 31 October 2004, but due to opposition from the European Parliament to the proposed Barroso Commission which would succeed it, it was extended and finally left office on 21 November 2004. When his mandate expired, Prodi returned to domestic politics.

== Return to Italian politics (2005–2006) ==
=== The Union primary election ===
Shortly before the end of his term as President of the European Commission, Prodi returned to national Italian politics at the helm of the enlarged centre-left coalition, The Union.

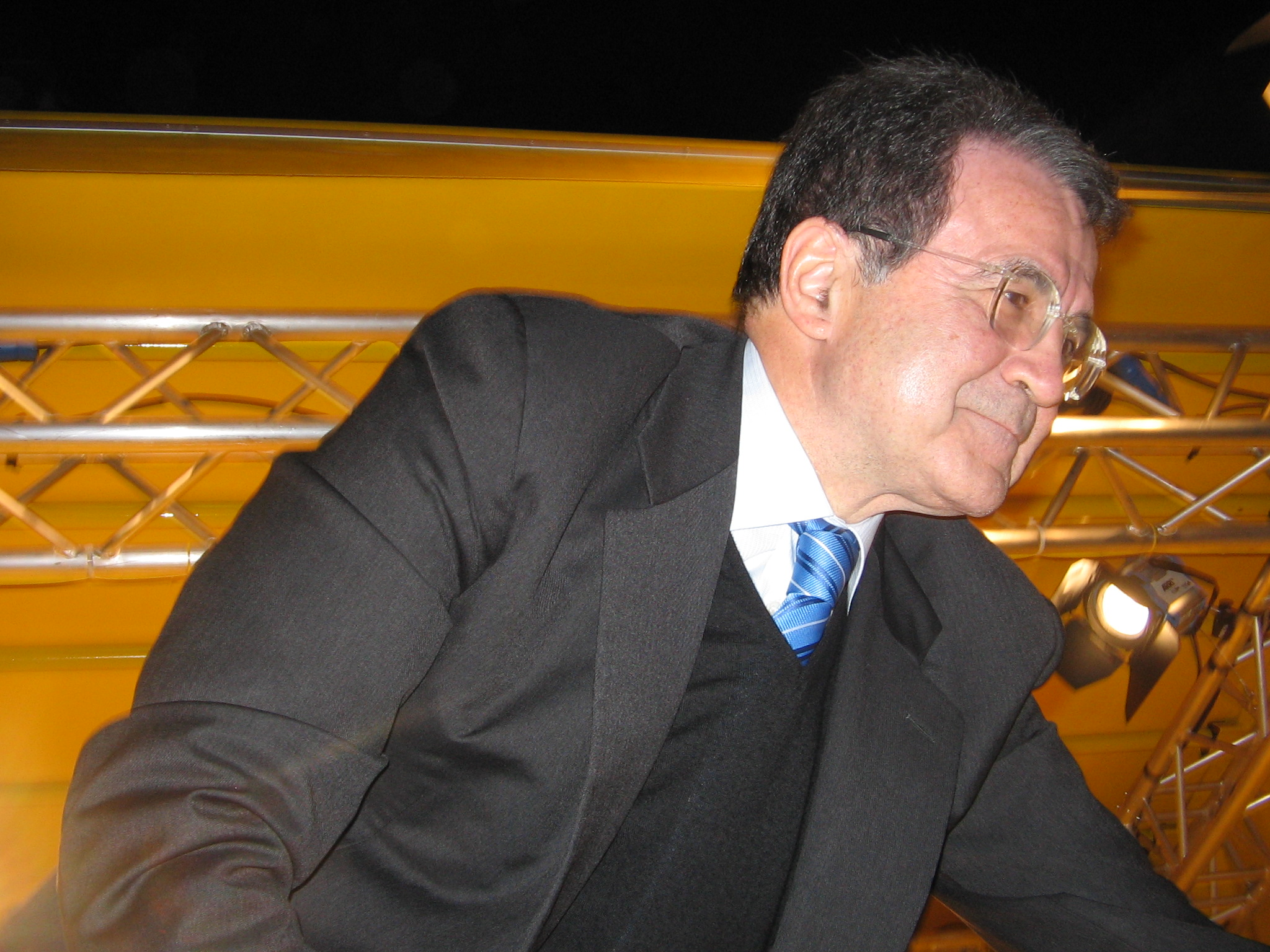
Prodi in Bari during the electoral campaign

Having no party of his own, in order to officially state his candidacy for the 2006 general election, Prodi came up with the idea of an apposite primary election, the first of its kind to be ever introduced in Europe and seen by its creator (Prodi himself) as a democratic move to bring the public and its opinion closer to Italian politics.

When the primary elections were first proposed, they were mostly meant as a plebiscite for Romano Prodi since there were no other candidates for the leadership of the coalition. The secretary of the Communist Refoundation Party, Fausto Bertinotti, then announced he would run for the leadership, even if only to act as a symbolic candidate, to avoid a one-candidate election. After some time, more candidates were presented, like Union of Democrats for Europe leader Clemente Mastella, Italy of Values leader and former magistrate Antonio Di Pietro, Federation of the Greens leader Alfonso Pecoraro Scanio and a few minor candidates.

The primary election may have been foreseen as an easy win for Romano Prodi, with the other candidates running mostly to "measure their strengths" in the coalition, and they often talked about reaching a certain percentage rather than winning. However, there were rumours of supporters of the House of Freedoms trying to participate in the elections and vote in favour of Mastella, reputed to be the least competent of the candidates and the least likely to win against Berlusconi, other than the most centrist; other rumours indicated such "fake" left-wing voters would vote for Bertinotti, because his leadership would likely lose any grip on the political centre.

The election was held nationwide on 16 October 2005, from 8 am to 10 pm. Poll stations were mainly managed on a voluntary basis; they were hosted mainly in squares, local party quarters, schools, and even restaurants, bars, campers and a hairdresser; some polling stations were also provided outside the country for Italians abroad. Most of the party leaders claimed that a result of 1 million voters would be a good success for the election, but over four million people for the occasion went to cast a vote in the primary election.

== Second term as Prime Minister (2006–2008) ==
=== Italian 2006 general election ===
After having won the centre-left primary election, Prodi led The Union coalition in the 2006 election. The Union was a heterogeneous alliance, which was formed by centrist parties like UDEUR and communists like PRC and Party of Italian Communists.

Prodi led his coalition in the electoral campaign preceding the election, eventually on 9 and 10 April won by a narrow margin of 25,000 votes, and a final majority of two seats in the Senate. Initial exit polls suggested a victory for Prodi, but the results narrowed as the count progressed. On 11 April 2006, Prodi declared victory; Berlusconi never conceded defeat explicitly, but this is not required by the Italian law.

Preliminary results showed The Union leading the House of Freedoms in the Chamber of Deputies, with 340 seats to 277, thanks to obtaining a majority bonus (actual votes were distributed 49.81% to 49.74%). One more seat is allied with The Union (Aosta Valley) and 7 more seats in the foreign constituency. The House of Freedoms had secured a slight majority of Senate seats elected within Italy (155 seats to 154), but The Union won 4 of the 6 seats allocated to voters outside Italy, giving them control of both chambers.

On 19 April 2006, Italy's Supreme Court of Cassation ruled that Prodi had indeed won the election, winning control of the Chamber of Deputies by only 24,755 votes out of more than 38 million votes cast, and winning 158 seats in the Senate to 156 for Berlusconi's coalition. Even so, Berlusconi refused to concede defeat, claiming unproven fraud.

=== Government formation ===
Prodi's appointment was somewhat delayed, as the outgoing president of the Republic, Carlo Azeglio Ciampi, ended his mandate in May, not having enough time for the usual procedure (consultations made by the president, appointment of a prime minister, the motion of confidence and oath of office). After the acrimonious election of Giorgio Napolitano to replace Ciampi, Prodi could proceed with his transition to government. On 16 May he was invited by Napolitano to form a government. The following day, 17 May 2006, Prodi and his second cabinet were sworn into office.

Prodi's new cabinet drew in politicians from across his centre-left winning coalition, in addition to Tommaso Padoa-Schioppa, an unelected former official of the European Central Bank with no partisan membership. Romano Prodi obtained the support for his cabinet on 19 May at the Senate and on 23 May at the Chamber of Deputies.

The coalition led by Prodi, thanks to the electoral law which gave the winner a sixty-seat majority, can count on a good majority in the Chamber of Deputies but only on a narrow majority in the Senate. The composition of the coalition was heterogeneous, combining parties of communist ideology, the Party of Italian Communists and Communist Refoundation Party, within the same government as parties of Catholic inspiration, Democracy is Freedom – The Daisy and UDEUR. The latter was led by Clemente Mastella, former chairman of Christian Democracy. Therefore, according to critics, it was difficult to have a single policy in different key areas, such as economics and foreign policy (for instance, Italian military presence in Afghanistan).

=== Foreign policy ===
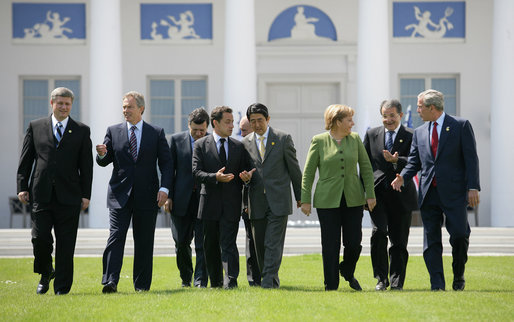
Prodi at the Helligendamm G8 Summit, June 2007

In foreign policy, the Prodi II Cabinet continued the engagement in Afghanistan, under UN command, while withdrawing troops from post-invasion Iraq on 18 May 2006, when Prodi laid out some sense of his new foreign policy, pledging to withdraw Italian troops from Iraq and called the Iraq War a "grave mistake that has not solved but increased the problem of security".

The major effort of foreign minister Massimo D'Alema concerned the aftermath of the 2006 Lebanon War, being the first to offer troops to the UN for the constitution of the UNIFIL force, and assuming its command in February 2007. In fact, Prodi had a key role in the creation of a multinational peacekeeping force in Lebanon following the Israel-Lebanon conflict.

Italy led negotiations with the Israeli foreign minister Tzipi Livni and was proposed by Israel to head the multinational peacekeeping mission, although the dangers of the mission for Italian troops sparked warnings from the center-right opposition that it could prove a "kamikaze" mission, with the peacekeepers sandwiched between Israel and the well-armed Hezbollah. Prodi and D'Alema pledged Italy's willingness to enforce the United Nations resolution on Lebanon and urged other European Union member states to do the same because the stability of the Middle East should be a chief concern for Europeans.

=== Coalition's troubles ===
Prodi's government faced a crisis over policies in early 2007, after just nine months of government. Three ministers in Prodi's Cabinet boycotted a vote in January to continue funding for Italian troop deployments in Afghanistan. Lawmakers approved the expansion of the US military base Caserma Ederle at the end of January, but the victory was so narrow that Deputy Prime Minister Francesco Rutelli criticised members of the coalition who had not supported the government. At around the same time, Justice Minister Clemente Mastella, of the coalition member UDEUR, said he would rather see the government fall than support its unwed couples legislation.

Tens of thousands of people marched in Vicenza against the expansion of Caserma Ederle, which saw the participation of some leading far-left members of the government. Harsh debates followed in the Italian Senate on 20 February 2007. Deputy Prime Minister and Foreign Affairs Minister Massimo D'Alema declared during an official visit in Ibiza, Spain, that, without a majority on foreign policy affairs, the government would resign. The following day, D'Alema gave a speech at the Senate representing the government, clarifying his foreign policy and asking the Senate to vote for or against it. In spite of the fear of some senators that Prodi's defeat would return Silvio Berlusconi to power, the Senate did not approve a motion backing Prodi's government foreign policy, two votes shy of the required majority of 160.

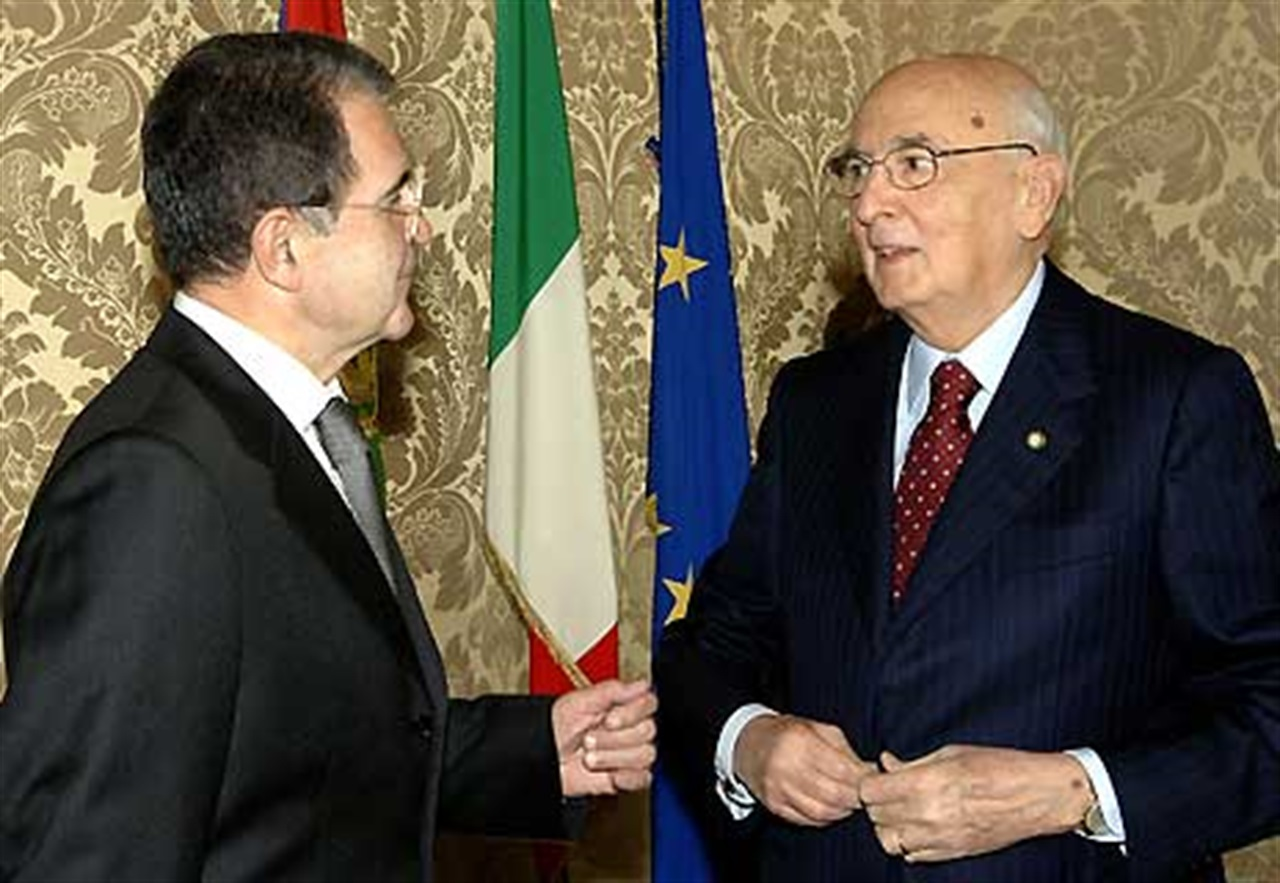
Prodi with President Giorgio Napolitano

After a government meeting on 21 February, Romano Prodi tendered his resignation to the president, Giorgio Napolitano, who cut short an official visit to Bologna in order to receive the prime minister. Prodi's spokesman indicated that he would only agree to form a new Government "if, and only if, he is guaranteed the full support of all the parties in the majority from now on." On 22 February, centre-left coalition party leaders backed a non-negotiable list of twelve political conditions given by Prodi as conditions of his remaining in office. President Napolitano held talks with political leaders on 23 February to decide whether to confirm Prodi's Government, ask Prodi to form a new government or call fresh elections.

Following these talks, on 24 February, President Napolitano asked Prodi to remain in office but to submit to a vote of confidence in both houses. On 28 February, the Senate voted to grant confidence to Prodi's Government. Though facing strong opposition from the centre-right coalition, the vote resulted in a 162–157 victory. Prodi then faced a vote of confidence in the lower house on 2 March, which he won as expected with a large majority of 342–198.

On 14 October 2007, Prodi oversaw the merger of two main parties of the Italian centre-left, Democrats of the Left and Democracy is Freedom – The Daisy, creating the Democratic Party. Prodi himself led the merger of the two parties, which had been planned over a twelve-year period, and became the first President of the party. He announced his resignation from that post on 16 April 2008, two days after the Democratic Party's defeat in the general election.

=== 2008 crisis and resignation ===
In early January 2008, Justice Minister and Union of Democrats for Europe's leader Clemente Mastella resigned after his wife Sandra Lonardo was put under house arrest for corruption charges. With three Senators, UDEUR was instrumental in ensuring a narrow centre-left majority in the Italian Senate.

After first promising to support the government, he later retracted this support, and his party followed, in part also due to pressure from the Vatican, for which the government's proposed laws regarding registered partnerships of same-sex couples, and other liberal reforms were objectionable. Mastella also cited lack of solidarity from the majority parties after the arrest of his wife, and declared that his party would vote against the government bills since then.

The decision of former Minister of Justice Mastella arrived a few days after the confirmation of the Constitutional Court which confirmed the referendum to modify the electoral system. As stated multiple times by Minister Mastella, if the referendum had been confirmed, it would lead directly to the fall of the government and it happened.
The fall of the government would disrupt a pending election-law referendum that, if passed, would make it harder for small parties like Mastella's to gain seats in parliament.

The UDEUR defection forced caused Prodi to ask for a confidence vote in both Chambers: he won a clear majority in the Chamber of Deputies on 23 January, but was defeated 156 to 161 (with 1 abstention) in the Senate the next day. He therefore tendered his resignation as prime minister to President Giorgio Napolitano, who accepted it and appointed the President of the Senate, Franco Marini, with the task of evaluating possibilities for forming an interim government to implement electoral reforms prior to holding elections. Marini, after consultation with all major political forces, acknowledged the impossibility of doing so on 5 February, forcing Napolitano to announce the end of the legislature. Prodi said that he would not seek to lead a new government and snap election were called. In the election that followed in April 2008, Berlusconi's centre-right The People of Freedom and allies defeated the Democratic Party.

== After the premiership (2008–present) ==
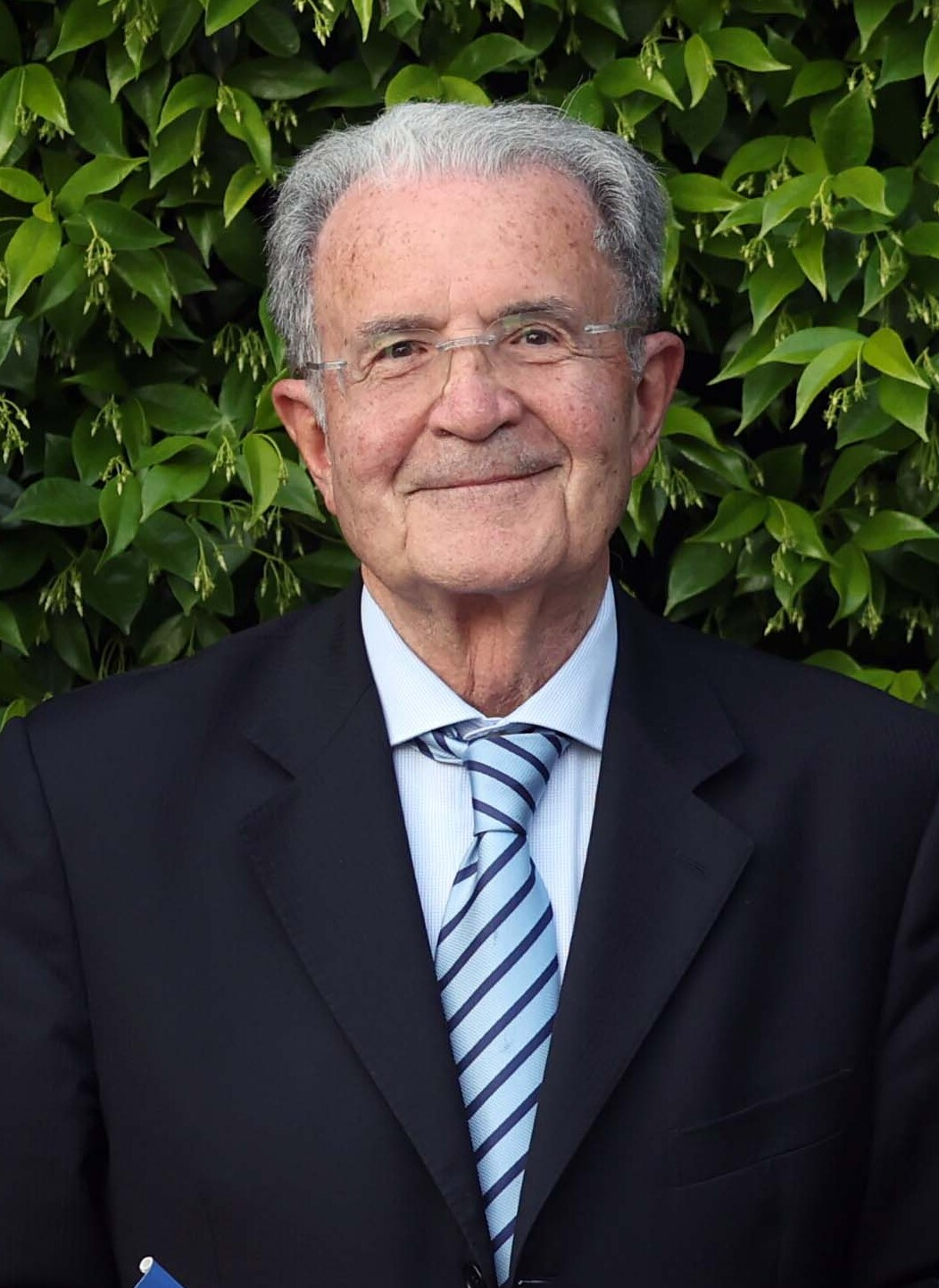
Prodi in 2024

On 19 March 2008, during the political campaign for the snap general election, Romano Prodi stated: "I called it a day with Italian politics and maybe with politics in general."

On 12 September 2008, Prodi was named by the UN as head of a joint AU-UN panel aimed at enhancing peacekeeping operations in Africa.

On 6 February 2009, he was appointed Professor-at-Large at the Watson Institute for International Studies of Brown University. Since 2010 Romano Prodi is the chair for Sino-European dialogue at the China Europe International Business School (CEIBS – Shanghai&Beijing), China's leading business school.

On 9 October 2012, Romano Prodi was appointed by the UN Secretary-General Ban Ki-moon as his Special Envoy for the Sahel. He served in that position until 31 January 2014.

Prodi is also a member of the Club de Madrid, an international organization of former democratic statesmen, which works to strengthen democratic governance and leadership. He is a former member of the Steering Committee of the Bilderberg Group.

=== 2013 presidential candidate ===
Prodi was drafted by Democratic Party parliamentarians to be President of Italy during the 2013 presidential election after Democratic Party–People of Freedom compromise candidate Franco Marini failed to receive sufficient votes on the first ballot. During the first three rounds of voting, few people cast ballots for Prodi (14 on the first ballot, 13 on the second and 22 on the third).

On 16 April 2013, just a few days prior to the fourth ballot, Prodi gave a lectio magistralis at the Pontifical University of St. Thomas Aquinas, Angelicum entitled "I grandi cambiamenti della politica e dell'economia mondiale: c'è un posto per l'Europa?" ("The Great Changes in Politics and the World Economy: Is there Room for Europe?). Prodi was sponsored by the Angelicum and the Università degli Studi Guglielmo Marconi on behalf of the Political Science program "Scienze Politiche e del Buon Governo."

A few days later, on 19 April, starting on the fourth ballot, Prodi was looked at seriously as a possible candidate. However, Prodi announced he was pulling out of the presidential race after more than 100 centre-left electors did not vote for him as he received only 395 (of 504 votes needed to be elected). After this vote, Pier Luigi Bersani, leader of the centre-left Democratic Party, announced his resignation as the party's secretary. As of September 2020, he is a member of the Italian Aspen Institute.

== Electoral history ==
Election	House	Constituency	Party	Votes	Result
1996	Chamber of Deputies	Bologna–Mazzini	Ulivo	55,830	Elected
2006	Chamber of Deputies	Emilia-Romagna	Ulivo	– (Note: Elected in a closed list proportional representation system.)	Elected

=== First-past-the-post elections ===
1996 general election (C): Bologna — Mazzini
Candidate	Party	Votes	%
Romano Prodi	The Olive Tree	55,830	60.8
Filippo Berselli	Pole for Freedoms	35,972	39.2
Total		91,802	100.0

== Honours and awards ==
- Albania: Received a copy of the Key of the City of Tirana on the occasion of his state visit to Albania.
- France: Grand Cross of the Legion of Honour (2013)
- Italy: Knight of Grand Cross of the Order of Merit of the Italian Republic (2 June 1993)
- Japan: Grand Cordon of the Order of the Rising Sun (2012)
- KSA: Grand Cordon of the Order of Abdulaziz Al Saud (2007)
- Latvia: First Class of the Order of the Three Stars (2007)
- Poland: Knight Grand Cross of the Order of Merit of the Republic of Poland (1997)
- Romania: Knight Grand Cross of the Order of the Star of Romania (2000)
- Slovakia: Grand Cordon of the Order of the White Double Cross (2022)
- Slovenia: First Class of the Order for Exceptional Merits (2005)
- Spain: The Most Excellent Sir Grand Cross of the Royal Order of Isabella the Catholic (1998)

=== Academic awards ===
- Laurea in Giurisprudenza (110 e lode) Università Cattolica Milano (1961)
- Madras University (India, 1998)
- Sofia University (Bulgaria, 1998)
- Universitat Politecnica de Barcelona (Spain, 1998)
- Brown University (United States, 1999)
- University of Michigan (United States, 1999)
- Bucharest Academy of Economic Studies (Romania, 2000)
- Catholic University of Leuven (Belgium, 2000)
- University of Malta (Malta, 2000)
- University of Modena and Reggio Emilia (Italy, 2000)
- University of Ottawa (Canada, 2000)
- St. Gallen University (Switzerland, 2000)
- Kyung Hee University (South Korea, 2000)
- Pisa University (Italy, 2001)
- University of Tirana (Albania, 2001)
- Carleton University (Canada, 2001)
- Instituto de Empresa de Madrid (Spain, 2002)
- University of Oxford (United Kingdom, 2002)
- Pavia University (Italy, 2002)
- Skopje University (North Macedonia, 2003)
- Tunis University (Tunisia, 2003)
- University of Calabria (Italy, 2003)
- Torino University (Italy, 2004)
- Lublin University (Poland, 2004)
- Tongji University (P.R.China, 2006)
- Catholic University of Milan (Italy, 2007)
- Addis Abeba University (2007)
- University of Calcutta (2007)
- University of Freiburg (2008)
- MIRBIS University Moscow (2009)
- Chinese Academy of Governance (P.R.China, 2010)
- University of Nova Gorica (2010)
- Nankai University (P.R.China, 2010)
- University of Halle-Wittenberg (Germany, 2011)

== Publications ==
- Modello di sviluppo di un settore in rapida crescita: l'industria della ceramica per l'edilizia, Milan, ed. Franco Angeli, 1966
- Concorrenza dinamica e potere di mercato. Politica industriale e fusioni d'impresa, Milan, ed. Franco Angeli, 1967
- La diffusione dell'innovazione nell'industria italiana, Bologna, ed. Il Mulino, 1973
- Sistema economico e sviluppo industriale in Italia, Bologna, ed. Il Mulino, 1973
- Per una riconversione e ristrutturazione dell'industria italiana, Bologna, ed. Il Mulino, 1980
- C'è un posto per l'Italia fra i due capitalismi?, Bologna, ed. Il Mulino, 1991
- Una crisi non solo politica: L'industria italiana a rischio, Bologna, ed. Il Mulino, 1991
- Modello strategico per le privatizzazioni, Bologna, ed. Il Mulino, 1992
- La società istruita. Perché il futuro italiano si gioca in classe, Bologna, ed. Il Mulino, 1993
- Il capitalismo ben temperato, Bologna, ed. Il Mulino, 1995
- La mia Italia, Rome, ed. Carmenta, 1995.
- Un'idea dell'Europa (Contemporanea), Bologna, ed. Il Mulino, 1999 (trad. Europe as I See It, Cambridge, ed. Polity Press, 2000).
- Una nuova anima europea, Rome, ed. AVE, 2002.
- La mia visione dei fatti. Cinque anni di governo in Europa, Bologna, ed. Il Mulino, 2008.
- Capire il mondo. Il futuro sfida l'Europa, Rome, ed. Cittadella, 2012.
- Missione incompiuta: Intervista su politica e democrazia, Rome/Bari, ed. Editori Laterza, 2015.
- Tra politica e politiche: La lezione di Nino (with Enrico Letta), Bologna, ed. Il Mulino, 2016.
- Il piano inclinato: Conversazione con Giulio Santagata e Luigi Scarola (Voci), Bologna, ed. Il Mulino, 2017.
- L'acqua: armonie, disarmonie, conflitti (with Giuseppe Zaccaria), Padova, ed. Padova University Press, 2019.
- Strana vita, la mia, Milan, ed. Solferino, 2021.
- Le immagini raccontano l'Europa, Milan, ed. Rizzoli, 2021.

== See also ==
- Enlargement of the European Union
- Lisbon Agenda

== Notes ==
Political offices
Preceded by Carlo Donat-Cattin	Minister of Industry, Commerce and Crafts; 1978–1979	Succeeded by Franco Nicolazzi
Preceded by Lamberto Dini	Prime Minister of Italy; 1996–1998	Succeeded by Massimo D'Alema
Preceded by Manuel Marín	President of the European Commission; 1999–2004	Succeeded by José Manuel Barroso
Preceded by Silvio Berlusconi	Prime Minister of Italy; 2006–2008	Succeeded by Silvio Berlusconi
Party political offices
Position established	Leader of The Olive Tree; 1995–1998	Succeeded by Massimo D'Alema
Preceded by Francesco Rutelli	Leader of The Olive Tree; 2004–2007	Position abolished
Position established	President of the Democratic Party; 2007–2008	Succeeded by Rosy Bindi
