= Giorgio Prodi =

Italian oncologist (1928–1987)

Giorgio Prodi (August 12, 1928 – December 4, 1987) was an Italian medical scientist, oncologist and semiotician.

Prodi was born in Scandiano, Italy in 1928, and studied medicine and chemistry at the University of Bologna. From 1958, he taught general pathology and experimental oncology in the same university. He held Italy's first Chair of Oncology. In 1973 he founded the Institute of Cancerology at Bologna, of which he became the first director.

He published a series of books on the philosophy of medicine and biology. Together with Thomas Sebeok and Thure von Uexküll, he developed a semiotic approach in biology (biosemiotics) in his works of the 1970s and 1980s. Umberto Eco appreciated Prodi's approach in semiotics.

He was also a writer of fiction. His semi-autobiographical novel Lazzaro (a fictionalised biography of his fellow Scandianese and fellow scientist Lazzaro Spallanzani) was awarded the Premio Grinzane Cavour in 1986.

The Institute of Cancerology in the University of Bologna was renamed the "Giorgio Prodi" Centre of Cancer Research in his honour. The Giorgio Prodi Lecture Hall in the former monastery of San Giovanni in Monte is also named after him.

== Personal life ==
He was the brother of mathematician Giovanni Prodi, physicist and politician Vittorio Prodi, and economist Romano Prodi, former Prime Minister of Italy and President of the European Commission.

Prodi died in Bologna, Italy in 1987.

== Works ==
- Prodi, Giorgio 2021. The Material Basis of Meaning. (Tartu Semiotics Library 22.) Tartu: University of Tartu Press. Open access edition available at https://library.oapen.org/handle/20.500.12657/50917
