= Knight of Wands =

Tarot card of the Minor Arcana

Knight of Wands or Knight of Batons is used in Latin-suited playing cards including tarot decks. It is part of what tarot card readers call the Minor Arcana. Tarot cards are used throughout much of Europe to play tarot card games.

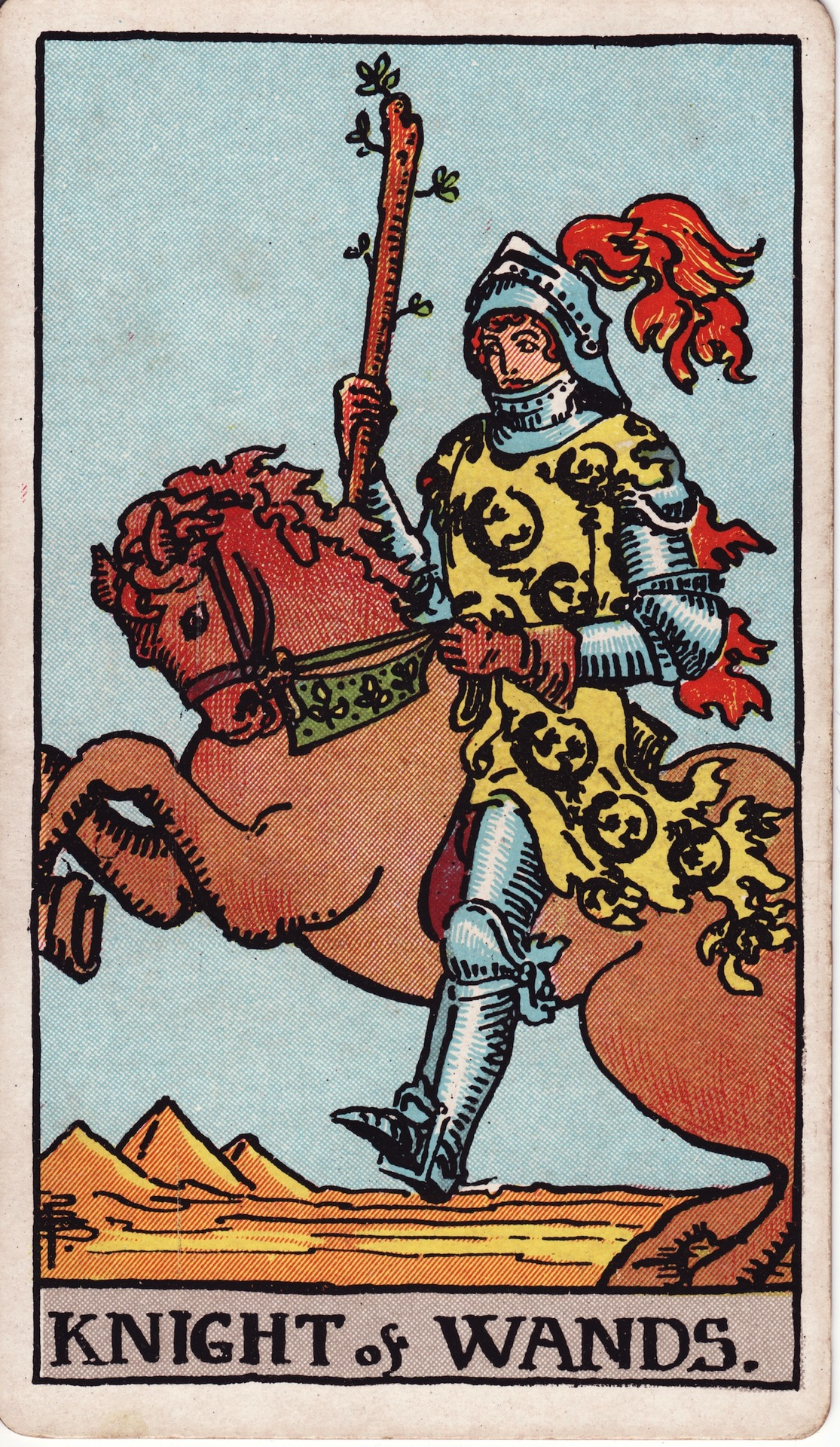
Knight of Wands from the Rider–Waite tarot deck

In English-speaking countries, where the games are largely unknown, Tarot cards came to be utilized primarily for divinatory purposes.

== Divination usage ==
The questing knight, this man traditionally signifies travel, and progress. This also refers to new ideas and inventions. He looks forward, intelligent and knowledgeable, and yet ready for battle and full of fire.

The reversed meaning of the card is insecurity and fear of revealing one's true self.

== Key meanings ==
The key meanings of the Knight of Wands are: challenge, determination, foreign travel, leadership, and unpredictability.

== See also ==
- Spanish playing cards
