= Scandiano =

- Comune
- Comune di Scandiano
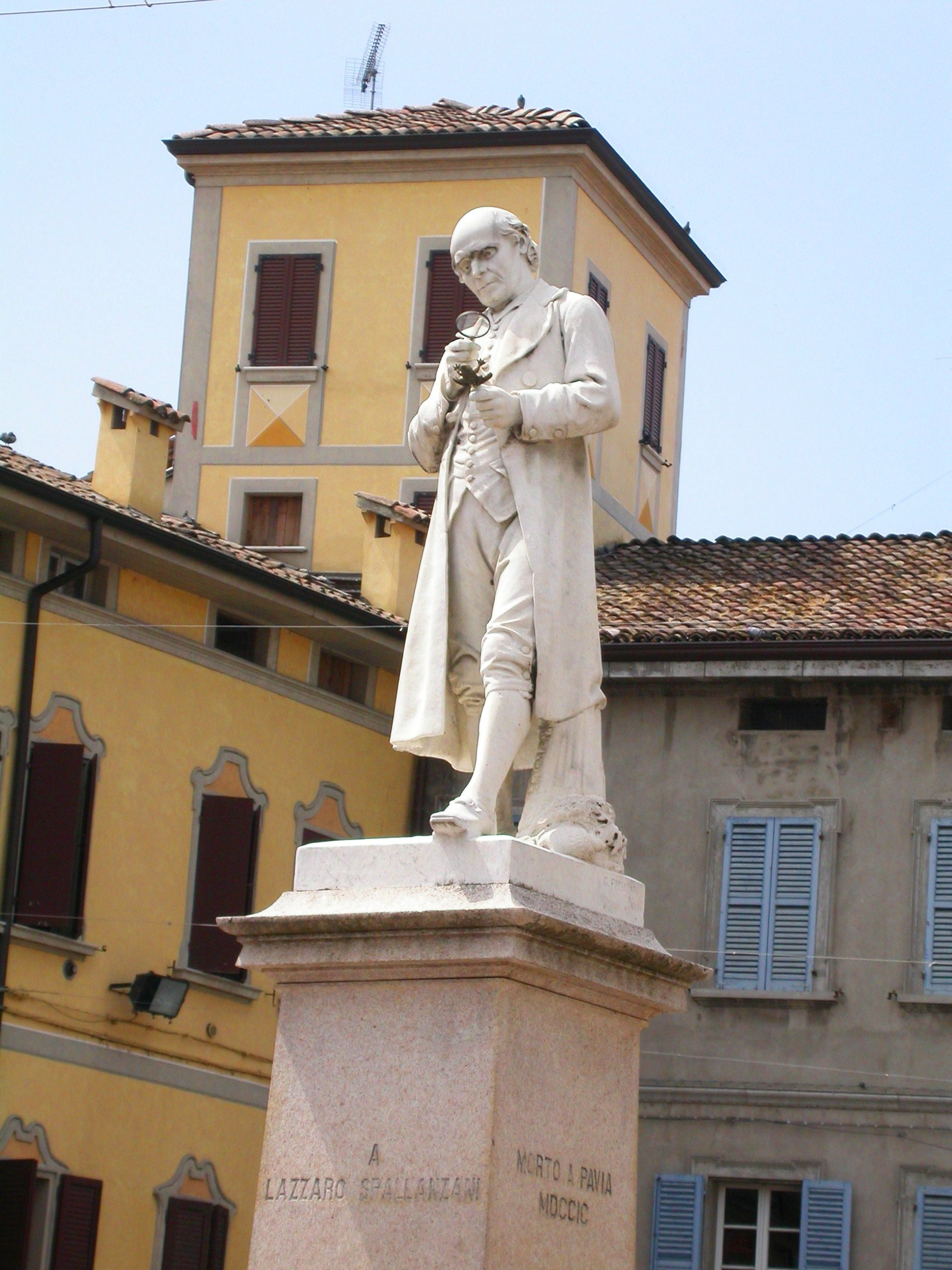
- Monument of Lazzaro Spallanzani

- Flag Coat of arms

- Location within Italy Location within Emilia-Romagna
- Coordinates: 44°35′50″N 10°41′30″E
- Country: Italy
- Region: Emilia-Romagna
- Province: Reggio nell'Emilia (RE)
- Frazioni: Arceto, Bosco, Cacciola, Ca' de' Caroli, Chiozza, Fellegara, Iano, Pratissolo, Rondinara, San Ruffino, Ventoso

Government
  - Mayor: Matteo Nasciuti

Area
  - Total: 49 km^{2} (19 sq mi)
- Elevation: 95 m (312 ft)

Population (31 December 2019)
  - Total: 25,896
  - Density: 530/km^{2} (1,400/sq mi)
- Demonym: Scandianesi
- Time zone: UTC+1 (CET)
  - Summer (DST): UTC+2 (CEST)
- Patron saint: St. Catherine of Alexandria
- Saint day: November 25

Scandiano (Reggiano: Scandiân) is a town and comune in Emilia-Romagna, in the northeast part of the country of Italy, near the city of Reggio nell'Emilia and the Secchia river. It had a population of 25,663 as of 31 December 2016.

== History ==
The current residential settlement was founded by one Gilberto Fogliani in 1262 with the construction of the Castle around which some houses developed. Initially built for defensive purposes, it was later transformed into a seigneurial mansion by the Boiardo family (1423–1560) and later into a Renaissance palace by the Marquis Thiene (1565–1623), the Bentivoglio (1623–45) and princes of Este (1645–1796).

Since the 1960s, the town has been an important centre for the production of tiles, connected to the district of Sassuolo.

=== Title ===
As a titular Duke of Modena, the current holder of the title of "Marquis of Scandiano" would be Prince Lorenz of Belgium, Archduke of Austria-Este.

== People ==
Natives of Scandiano are:

- Renaissance poet Matteo Maria Boiardo (1440–1494), whose family ruled Scandiano in the fifteenth century;
- Biologist Lazzaro Spallanzani (1729–1799), who lived in the eighteenth century.
- Politician Romano Prodi, who served as Prime minister of Italy from 17 May 1996 to 21 October 1998 and from 17 May 2006 to 8 May 2008.
- Medical scientist, oncologist and semiotician Giorgio Prodi (1928–1987)
- Photographer Luigi Ghirri.
- Footballer Villiam Vecchi (1948–2022).

== Twin towns ==
- Blansko, Czech Republic, since 1964
- Tubize, Belgium, since 1975
- Almansa, Spain, since 1989
