= Vittorio Prodi =

Italian politician (1937–2023)

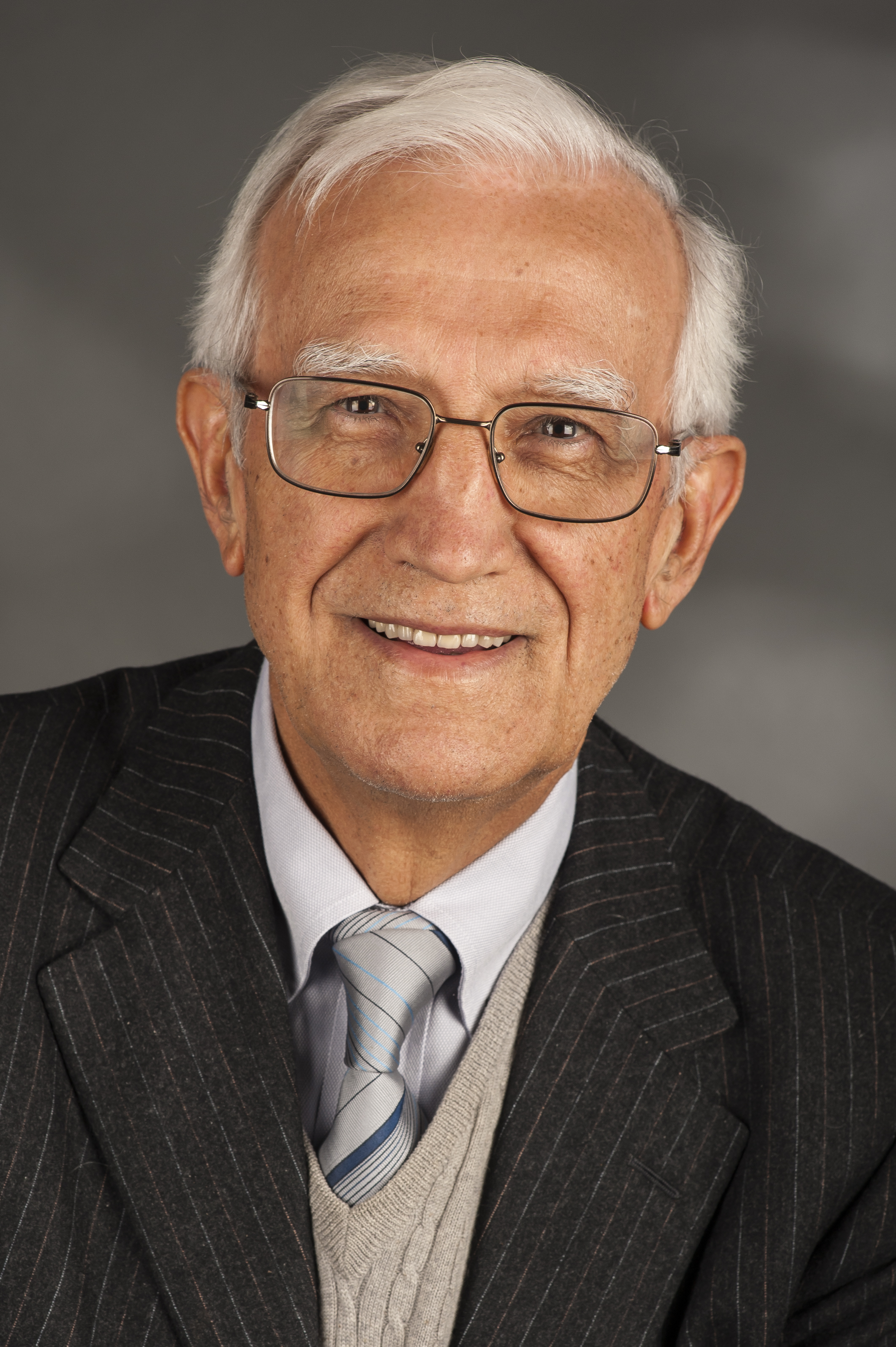

Member of the European Parliament
- In office 20 July 2004 – 30 June 2014
- Constituency: North-East Italy

President of the Province of Bologna
- In office 8 May 1995 – 14 June 2004
- Preceded by: Lamberto Cotti
- Succeeded by: Beatrice Draghetti

Personal details
- Born: 19 March 1937 Reggio Emilia, Italy
- Died: 29 July 2023 (aged 86) Bologna, Italy
- Party: PPI (1994–2002); DL (2002–2007); PD (2007–2014)
- Other political affiliations: United in the Olive Tree
- Children: 4
- Education: University of Bologna
- Profession: University professor

Vittorio Prodi (19 May 1937 – 29 July 2023) was an Italian politician who served as a member of the European Parliament from 2004 until 2014. He was a member of the Progressive Alliance of Socialists and Democrats.

== Biography ==
Prodi was born in Reggio Emilia in 1937, and was one of the former prime minister Romano Prodi's eight siblings. In the European Parliament, Prodi served on the Committee on Industry, Research and Energy. He was also a substitute for the European Parliament Committee on the Environment, Public Health and Food Safety, a member of the Delegation for relations with the United States, and a substitute for the Delegation for relations with the People's Republic of China. He represented the European Parliament at the 2008 United Nations Climate Change Conference in Poznań, Poland. He died on 29 July 2023, at the age of 86.

=== Career ===
- 1959: Graduated in physics at the University of Bologna
- 1970: lecturer in nuclear measurements
- since 1983: associate professor in the Physics Department of the University of Bologna
- 1995–2004: President of the Province of Bologna
- 2001–2004: Member of the provincial representation of the conference State – Cities – Local Governments and of the Unified Conference (State, Cities, Local Governments, and Regions)
- Author of numerous publications and of five international patents

== See also ==
- 2004 European Parliament election in Italy
- 2009 European Parliament election in Italy
