= Alfeo (name) =

- Gender: Male
- Language: Italian

Origin
- Meaning: "Enterprise", "profit"; i.e. "resourceful", "having profits"

Alfeo is a male Italian given name, and sometimes a surname, derived from the Greek Alphaios (Αλφαιος), itself based on Greek alphe (ἀλφὴ). Notable people with the name include:

== Given name ==
- Alfeo (Ludovico Ariosto character), character from the Orlando Furioso
- Alfeo Brandimarte, Italian naval officer
- Alfeo Brum, Uruguayan politician
- Alfeo Mizzau, Italian politician
