= Brandimarte (surname) =

Brandimarte is an Italian surname. Notable people with the surname include:

- Alfeo Brandimarte (1906–1944), Italian naval officer and resistance member
- Benedetto Brandimarte, 16th-century Italian painter

== See also ==
- Brandimarte
- Brandimarte Tommasi (1591–1648), Italian Roman Catholic prelate
