= William Huggins (disambiguation) =

William Huggins was an English astronomer.

William Huggins may also refer to:

- William Huggins (translator) (1696–1761), English translator
- William Huggins (animal artist) (1820–1884), English painter
- William John Huggins (1781–1845), English marine painter
- William "Bill" Huggins, one of the three trolls featured in ch. 2 of J.R.R. Tolkien's The Hobbit.
