= Chiusano =

Chiusano may refer to:

== Places ==
- Chiusano d'Asti, Italian municipality in the Province of Asti
- Chiusano di San Domenico, Italian municipality in the Province of Avellino

== People ==
- Felice Chiusano, Italian singer member of Quartetto Cetra
- Italo Alighiero Chiusano, Italian writer, Germanist and journalist
