= Pietro Dodi =

Italian general (1880–1944)

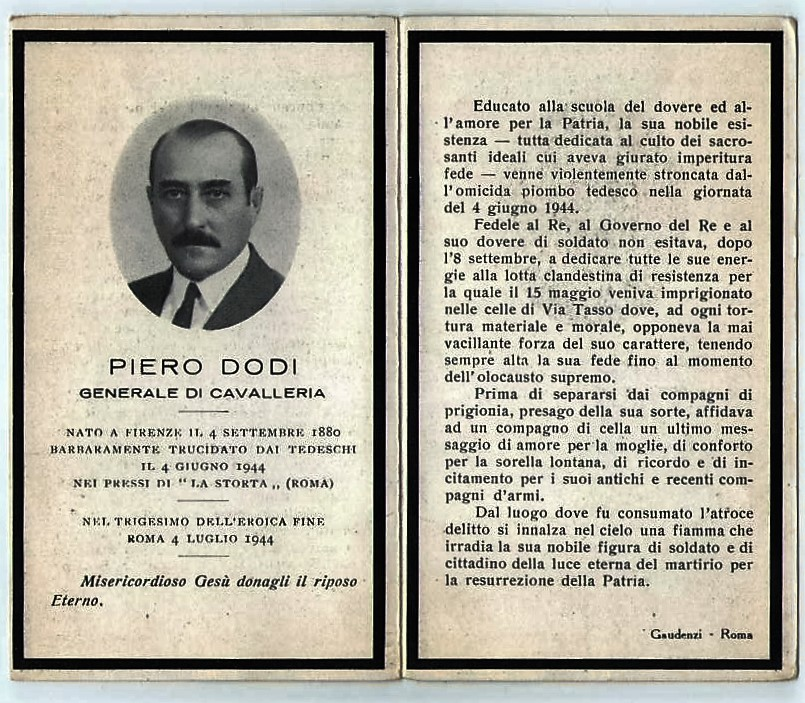
- Death card of General Dodi
- Born: 4 September 1880; Florence, Kingdom of Italy
- Died: 4 June 1944 (aged 63); La Storta, Italian Social Republic
- Military career
- Allegiance: Kingdom of Italy
- Branch: Royal Italian Army
- Rank: Brigadier General
- Conflicts: World War I; World War II
- Awards: Gold Medal of Military Valor (posthumous)

Pietro Dodi (4 September 1880 – 4 June 1944) was an Italian general and Resistance member during World War II.

== Biography ==
A career officer, Dodi had participated in the First World War as a cavalry captain in the "Cavalleggeri di Lucca" Regiment. Starting from 1921, he taught at the Cavalry Application School in Pinerolo; he later rose to the rank of brigadier general in the Army reserve.

In peacetime, he also had an important role in the development of equestrian sports in Italy, serving as president of the Italian Saddle Horse Society and of the Italian Equestrian Sports Federation (FISE) as well as director of the magazine Il cavallo italiano. He was also president of the Compagnia Importazione Esportazione Equini (Horse Import-Export Company).

Following the German occupation of Italy in the wake of the Armistice of Cassibile, Dodi became a member of the "Rosi" Resistance network in occupied Rome. On 5 May 1944 he was arrested by the SS and imprisoned in the Via Tasso prison, where he was tortured in the unsuccessful attempt to force him to reveal information about other members of the network. On 4 June 1944, as the Germans retreated from Rome, he and another thirteen high-profile prisoners (among them former Socialist deputy Bruno Buozzi and naval officer Alfeo Brandimarte) were loaded on a truck and taken to the hamlet of La Storta, in the countryside north of Rome, where they were shot. Dodi was posthumously awarded the Gold Medal of Military Valor.
