= Marphise =

Painting by Eugène Delacroix

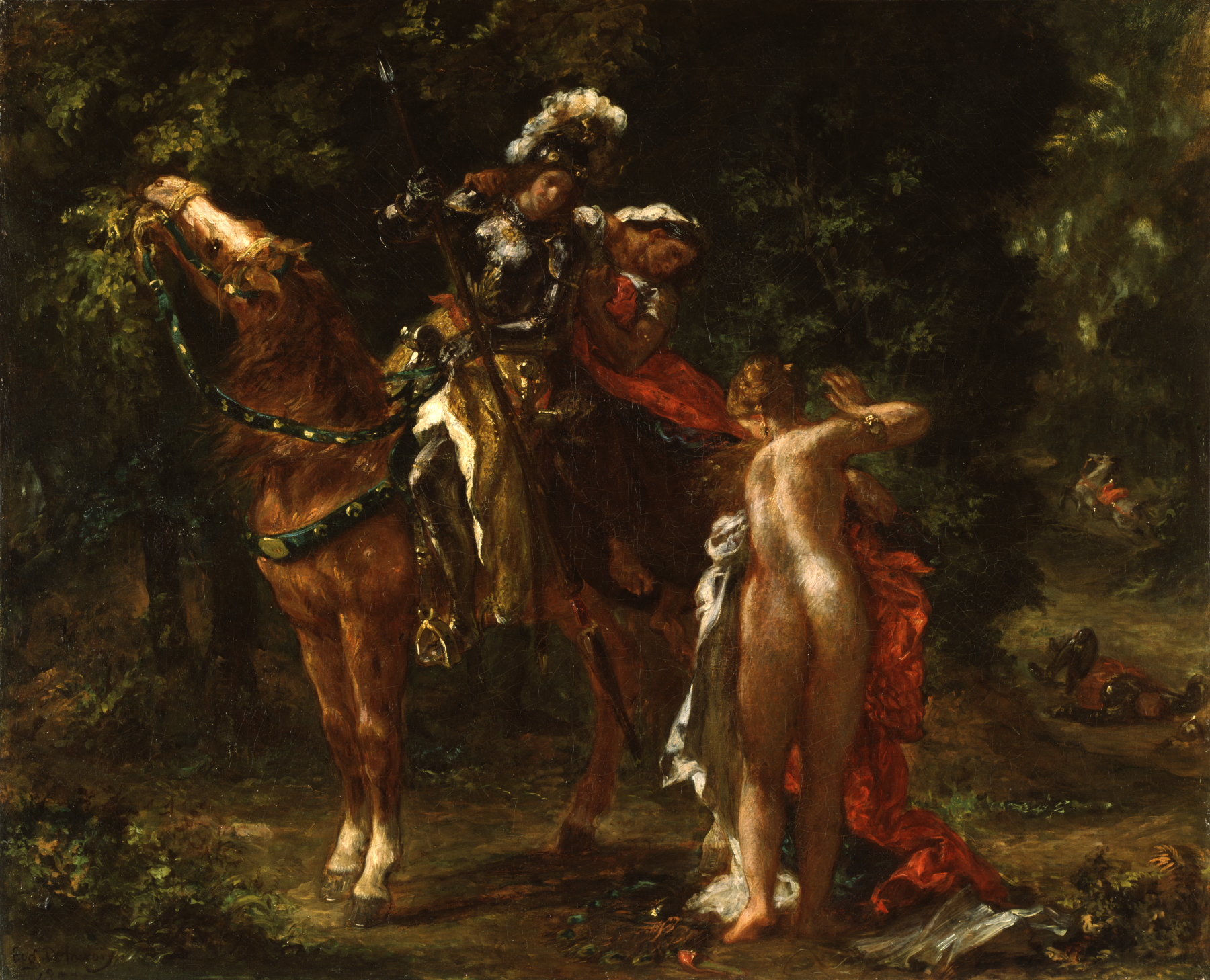
- Artist: Eugène Delacroix
- Year: 1852
- Type: Oil on canvas, history painting
- Dimensions: 82 cm × 101 cm (32 in × 40 in)
- Location: Walters Art Museum, Baltimore

Marphise is an 1852 oil on canvas history painting by the French artist Eugène Delacroix. The picture was inspired by the epic poem Orlando Furioso by the Italian Renaissance writer Ludovico Ariosto. It depicts a scene where the female warrior Marphise has knocked the knight Pinabello off his horse after his arrogant lady friend had mocked Marphise's companion Gabrina. Pinabello's lady is forced by Marphise to strip naked and give her fine clothes to Gabrina. This was one of the later works of Delacroix, a major figure of the Romantic movement the painting has been in the Walters Art Museum in Baltimore, Maryland since 1931.

== Bibliography ==
- Allard, Sébastien & Fabre, Côme. Delacroix. Metropolitan Museum of Art, 2018
- Alston, Isabella. Delacroix. Taj Books, 2014.
