= William Huggins (translator) =

English translator

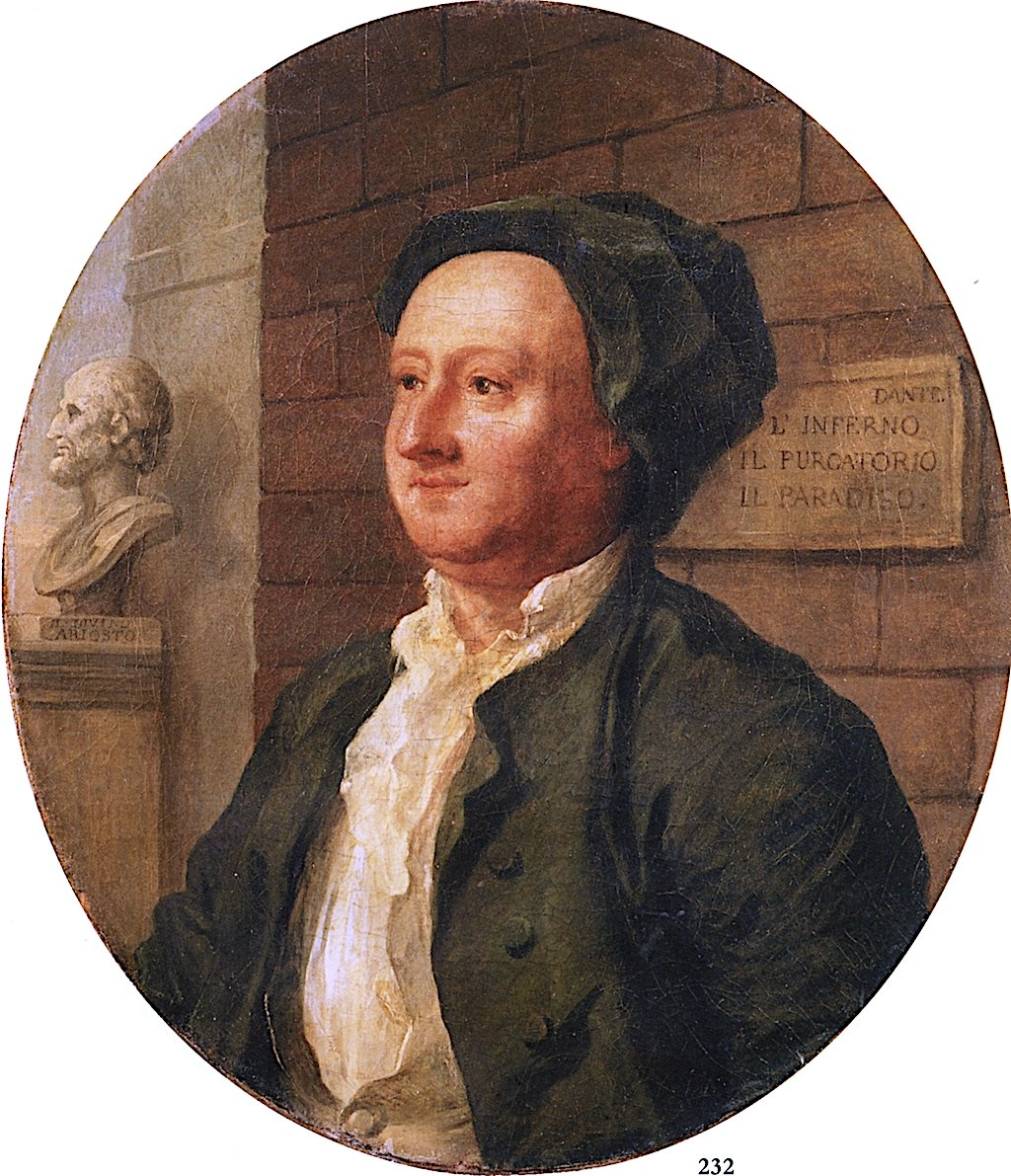
- Born: 1696
- Died: 2 July 1761 (aged 64–65)
- Occupation: Translator

William Huggins (1696 – 2 July 1761) was an English translator of Ariosto.

== Biography ==
Huggins was the son of John Huggins, warden of the Fleet prison. He was born in 1696, matriculated at Magdalen College, Oxford, 16 August 1712, proceeded B.A. 1716, M.A. 1719, and became fellow of his college 1722. Abandoning an intention of taking holy orders, he was, on 27 October 1721, appointed wardrobe-keeper and keeper of the private lodgings at Hampton Court. He subsequently resided at Headly Park, Hampshire. He died 2 July 1761.

Huggins published:

- 'Judith, an Oratorio or Sacred Drama; the Music composed by Mr. William Fesche, late Chapel Master of the Cathedral Church at Antwerp,' London, 1733, 8vo.
- Translation of sonnets from the Italian of Giovanni Battista Felice Zappa, 1755, 4to.
- 'The Observer Observ'd; or Remarks on a certain curious Tract intitled "Observations on the Faiere [sic] Queene of Spencer," by Thomas Warton,' London, 1756, 8vo.
- 'Orlando Furioso . . . translated from the Italian,' 2 vols., London, 1757, 4to. This has an elaborate preface and annotations.This translation has been erroneously attributed to Huggins; it is the work of Temple Henry Croker. Huggins only supplied the annotations. At his death he left in manuscript a tragedy, a farce, and a translation of Dante, of which the 'British Magazine,' 1760, published a specimen. His portrait was both painted and engraved by William Hogarth, and was to have been prefixed to the translation of Dante.
