= L'ordalia =

1979 book by Italo Alighiero Chiusano

L′ordalia
- First edition
- Author: Italo Alighiero Chiusano
- Language: Italian
- Publisher: Rusconi
- Publication date: 1979

L′ordalia, is the third novel by Italo Alighiero Chiusano, published in 1979. The title recalls the ordeal, a judicial practice by which, during Middle Ages, the guilt or innocence of the accused was determined by subjecting them to an unpleasant, usually dangerous experience.

== Theme ==
Runo, a young scribe at the papal court in Rome, discovers that the famous Donation of Constantine, upon which the temporal power of the Pope is based, is a forgery. His disillusionment is so great that he leaves Rome and sets out on a life of adventure in search of the truth about himself, the world and the Church. In his wanderings through medieval Italy (it is the year 1000) he encounters many situations, some happy and some terrifying, and manages to defeat all his enemies. Master and guide in his journey is a wise monk, Petro, who faced himself directly the ordeal bearing his faith up above his head. In this journey, Runo takes part into battles, discovers true love in the arms of a beautiful countryside girl, and, eventually, meets the young emperor Otto III, to whom he reveals the secret of the forgery in the hope that Otto will build a Church without temporal possessions and power.

== Critics ==
The novel became very appreciated by the critics very soon after the publication, winning the prestigious Premio Selezione Campiello in 1979.

== Inspired novels ==
One year after the publication of L′ordalia, the novel The Name of the Rose, by Umberto Eco, was published. There are many similarities between the two novels: the time set (Middle Ages), the novel typology (meant as a bildungsroman, or coming-of-age novel), as well as the main character (a novice) and his helper (a wise monk, with the role of the master). These many similarities, and the notoriety of L′ordalia in 1979, of whom a literature expert such as Umberto Eco was definitely aware, make us think that L'ordalia could be one of the sources of inspiration of some parts of The Name of the Rose (which was written between 1978 and 1980). Moreover, the important role given by Chiusano to the main character's diary, symbol of his experience and evolution throughout all his adventures. It is chosen to link the main character's story, with the reader's one. And one can think of it as chosen by Eco to link Runo's story, with Adso's one, by means of the incipit: Naturally, a manuscript.
