= The Castle of Crossed Destinies =

1973 novel by Italo Calvino

- First edition, part one
- Author: Italo Calvino
- Original title: Il castello dei destini incrociati
- Language: Italian
- Genre: Speculative fiction
- Publication date: 1973
- Publication place: Italy
- Media type: Print; audiobook; digital
- ISBN: 9780156154550

The Castle of Crossed Destinies (Italian: Il castello dei destini incrociati) is a 1973 novel by Italian writer Italo Calvino.

== Background ==
The novel is in two parts, each using a different style of tarot deck. The first part was published alone in 1969 as Tarocchi: Il mazzo visconteo di Bergamo e New York (transl.Tarots: The Visconti Pack in Bergamo and New York). It contains allusions to Ludovico Ariosto's Orlando Furioso. The second part, with the header "The Tavern of Crossed Destinies", features the Tarot of Marseilles.

== Synopsis ==
The narrative details a meeting among travelers who are inexplicably unable to speak after passing through a forest. The characters in the novel recount their tales via tarot cards, which are reconstructed by the narrator. The deck scatters at the end of the novel, as do the characters' identities.

== Themes ==
The novel is an exploration of how meaning is created, whether that be written via words (by the author, via the book, since the characters in the book cannot speak to each other), or by images (the tarot cards—considered prophetic by some, and themselves open to many symbolic interpretations). It is, as often in Calvino's works, multilayered, and several levels of interpretations and readings are possible, based on the author–narrator–character–reader relationship.

== See also ==
- 1973 in literature
- Italian literature
