= Temple Henry Croker =

Irish writer

- Born: 1730?
- Died: 1790?
- Occupation: Writer

Temple Henry Croker (1730?–1790?) was an Irish miscellaneous writer.

== Biography ==
Croker was a native of Cork. He was admitted a foundation scholar of Westminster School in 1743, at the age of thirteen, and in 1746 was elected to a scholarship at Trinity College, Cambridge; but he removed to Christ Church, Oxford, where he graduated (B.A. 1750, M.A. 1760). He was appointed chaplain to the Earl of Hillsborough, and in August 1769 he obtained the rectory of Igtham, Kent, which he vacated in 1773, probably from pecuniary embarrassments, for he figures among the bankrupts of that year. Afterwards he became rector of St. John's, Capisterre, St. Christopher's, in the West Indies, where he published, under the title, ‘Where am I? How came I here? What are my wants? What are my duties?’ four sermons, Basseterre [1790], 4to.

His other works are:

- ‘Orlando Furioso,’ in Italian and English, with a portrait engraved by R. Strange, 2 vols. London, 1755, 4to.
- ‘Bower detected as an Historian, or his omissions and perversions of facts in favour of Popery demonstrated by comparing the three volumes of his History with the first volume of the French History of the Popes [by F. Brays] now translating,’ London, 1758, 8vo.
- ‘The Satires of Lodovico Ariosto,’ translated into English verse by the Rev. Mr. H-rt-n and T. H. Croker, London, 1759, 8vo.
- ‘Experimental Magnetism; or the truth of Mr. Masson's discoveries in that branch of natural philosophy approved and ascertained,’ London, 1761, 8vo.
- ‘The complete Dictionary of Arts and Sciences,’ 3 vols. London, 1764–6, fol. In preparing this work he had the assistance of several other persons, but he himself wrote all the theological, philological, and critical articles.
