= Brandimarte =

Literary character in the Matter of France

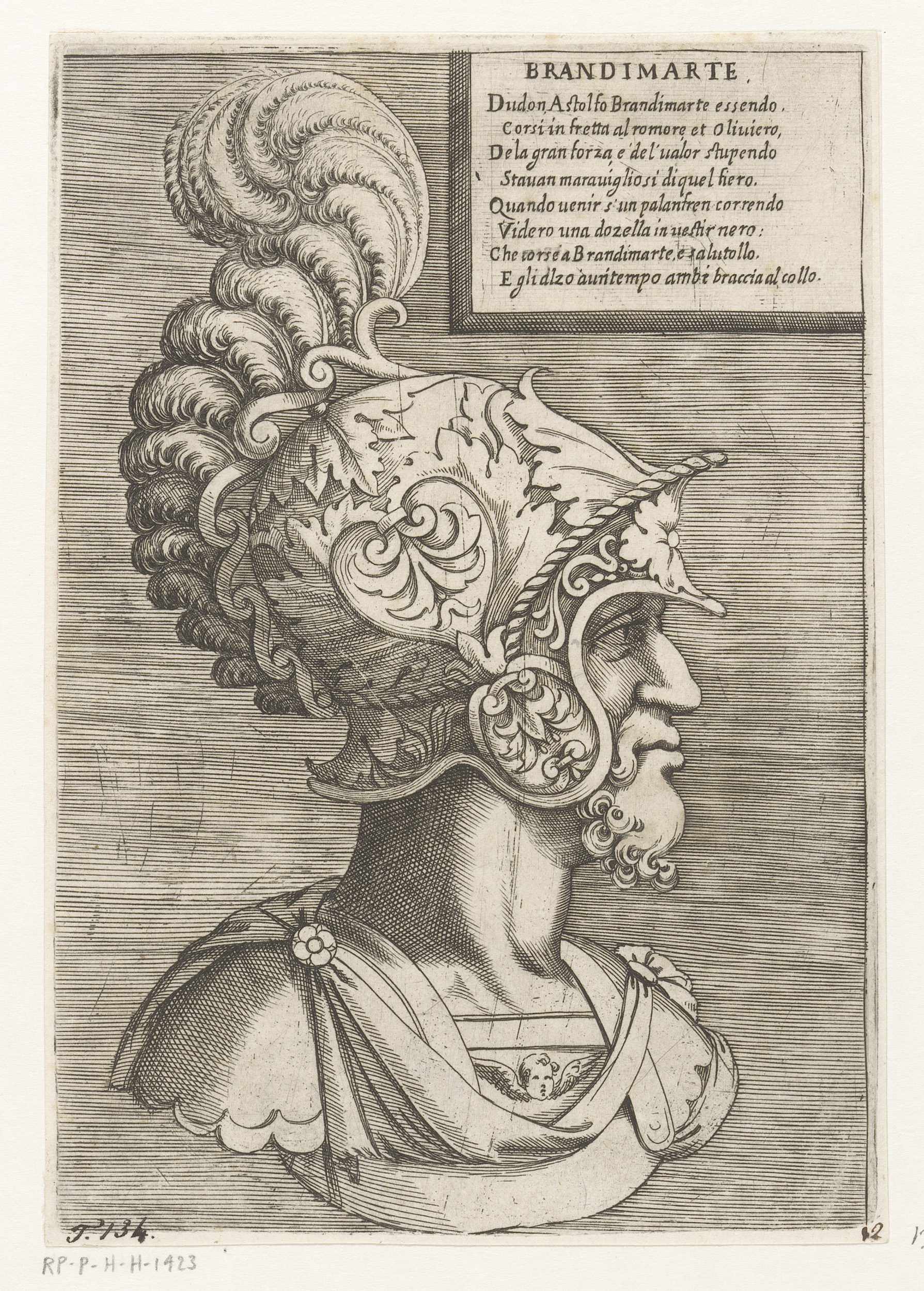
Bust of Brandimarte Character

Brandimarte is a fictional character of the Matter of France. He appears in Matteo Maria Boiardo's Orlando Innamorato and Ludovico Ariosto's Orlando Furioso. He is a Saracen knight who was baptized by Orlando and became his loving friend. He took part in the siege of Biserta. Orlando, Oliver, and Brandimarte were the three companions who took part in the final combat on Lampedusa, where he was killed by Gradasso.

Brandimarte was also a famous painter from a family of the same surname. The family name predated the fictional character. His paintings and organ door paintings can be found in the region of Italy from which many of the family surname originated. Mainly around the Le Marche region of Italy spanning San Benedetto Del Tronto to Monte Predone Italy. Brandimarte paintings utilized ciarascuro or light to dark which got him summoned to the Council of Trent for charges of being a degenerato or degenerate.

A Brandimarte painting sunk on a ship.

A Brandimarte rode with Charlemagne per an interpretation of the family crest and more research.
