= Alfeo Brandimarte =

Italian naval officer and Resistance member

- Born: 31 January 1906; Loreto, Kingdom of Italy
- Died: 4 June 1944 (aged 38); La Storta, Italian Social Republic
- Military career
- Allegiance: Kingdom of Italy
- Branch: Regia Marina
- Rank: Major
- Conflicts: Second Italo-Ethiopian War; World War II
- Awards: Gold Medal of Military Valor (posthumous)

Alfeo Brandimarte (31 January 1906 – 4 June 1944) was an Italian naval officer and Resistance member during World War II.

== Biography ==
Born in the province of Ancona in 1906, he graduated in mechanical engineering in 1928, specializing in electronics, and on the following year he joined the Royal Italian Army as a second lieutenant. In 1930 he was transferred to the Royal Italian Navy, joining the Corps of Naval Engineering, being promoted to captain in 1933. After holding the chair of electronics at the Naval Academy of Livorno, he was sent to Somalia in 1935 as director of military telecommunication services. In 1937, he was transferred to the newly conquered Addis Ababa to restore the local radio station, after which he returned to Italy to take up the post of deputy director of the Naval Academy's Electrotechnical Institute.

In 1940 he was promoted to major, and in June of that year he was part of a commission sent to Germany to evaluate the German prototypes of radar equipment. He was also a member of the Royal Naval Electrotechnical and Communications Institute (RIEC), and, along with professors Ugo Tiberio and Nello Carrara, one of the main contributors to the development of the first operational Italian naval radar, the Gufo radar. In September 1941 he left active service at his request and took over as CEO of a civilian company, employed in war industry.

After the armistice of Cassibile and the German occupation of Italy he became part of the Clandestine Military Front in German-occupied Rome, where he was responsible for establishing radio links with the Allies. On 23 May 1944 he was arrested by the SS due to a tip-off from a traitor and imprisoned in the Via Tasso prison in Rome, where he was tortured for information. On the evening of 3 June 1944, as the Allied forces were about to enter Rome, he was loaded by the Germans on a truck together with other thirteen prisoners, including General Pietro Dodi and former Socialist deputy Bruno Buozzi, in a convoy heading north along the Via Cassia. The next morning, the prisoners were shot near the hamlet of La Storta, in the Roman countryside. On 15 February 1945 Brandimarte was posthumously awarded the Gold Medal of Military Valor.
