= La Storta =

- Zona of Rome
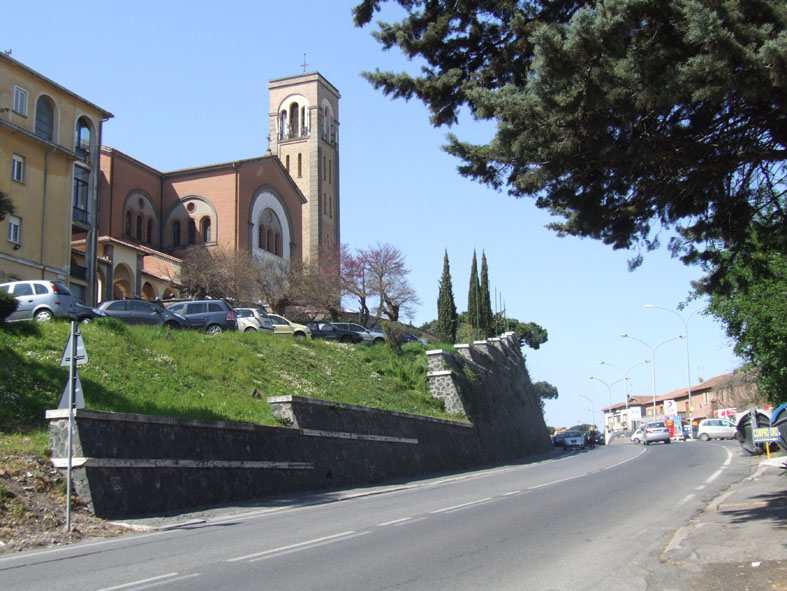
- The Cathedral of the Sacred Hearts of Jesus and Mary, along the Via Cassia in La Storta

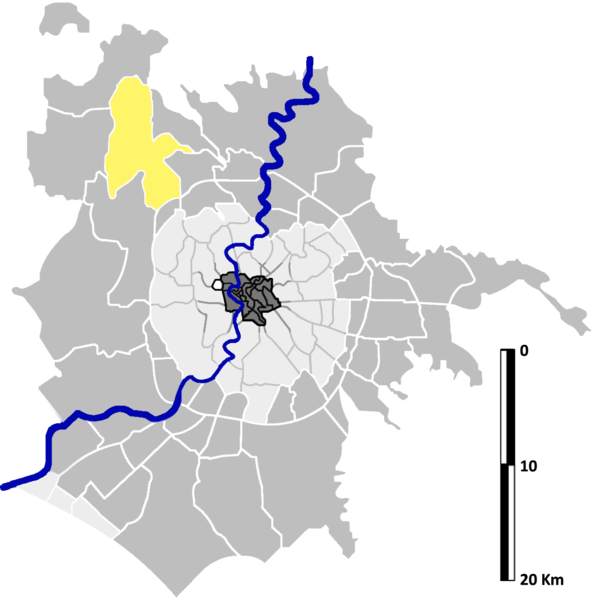
- Position of the zona within the city
- Country: Italy
- Region: Lazio
- Province: Rome
- Comune: Rome

Area
  - Total: 18.0198 sq mi (46.6710 km^{2})

Population (2016)
  - Total: 21,283
  - Density: 1,181.1/sq mi (456.02/km^{2})
- Time zone: UTC+1 (CET)
  - Summer (DST): UTC+2 (CEST)

La Storta is the 51st zona of the Italian capital city, Rome. It is identified by the initials Z. LI and falls within the boundaries of Municipio XV. (Note: It was previously part of both Municipi XIX and XX. See the Italian Wikipedia page for Municipio XV, which lists La Storta as Subdisivion 20h.)

The name La Storta ("the curve"; literally 'twisted' or 'bent') refers to a series of curves that the Via Cassia makes through the settlement.

== History ==
=== Statio on the Via Francigena ===
During the Middle Ages the locality was positioned along the Via Francigena, and was specifically mentioned as being a stop on the itinerary of Sigeric the Serious during his journey to Rome to accept the pallium as archbishop of Canterbury. The surviving account of his journey refers to La Storta as [Submansio] Joannis VIIII, the first stop outside of the city of Rome. (Note: Submansio means "lodging" or "stage," in reference to one day's journey. The so-called Itinerary of Sigeric is preserved among the Reliquiae Dunstanianae, the Memorials of Saint Dunstan (Cotton MS Tiberius B V, f. 23 v°), and date from 990 AD.) The stop was also referred to as San Giovanni in Nono (Latin: Sanctus Ioannes in Nono), since the way station was constructed next to a church dedicated to Saint John, and positioned at the nine-mile marker from the start of the Via Cassia.

=== Vision of Saint Ignatius ===
In November 1537, Ignatius of Loyola was traveling the Via Cassia towards Rome, accompanied by Peter Faber and Diego Laynez. The group paused at a small church in La Storta to pray. It was there that Ignatius is reported to have received a vision of God the Father and Christ holding the cross. Ignatius would later report that the Father had "given him ... to be henceforward consecrated wholly to His service," and Christ spoke the words Ego tibi Romae propitius ero ("I will be favorable to you in Rome"). The meaning of the sentence was not immediately clear to Ignatius, who thought it could mean that the three might be martyred at Rome. Pope Paul III instead gave him a very friendly reception.

The location of the apparition is memorialized today with a small chapel dedicated to Saint Ignatius in the Piazza della Visione ("Square of the Vision"). The site of the vision was a place of pilgrimage from the early days of the Society of Jesus, but the current form of the chapel was achieved only in the year 1700, when it was restored and decorated by the Superior General Thyrsus González de Santalla. The community celebrates the vision with its own feast day, the Feast of the Vision of Saint Ignatius. (The feast day is not, however, an ancient tradition, having been celebrated for the first time in 2011.) The feast is celebrated on the second Sunday of November, and is marked by processions, bands, and a reenactment of the vision.

=== La Storta Massacre ===
On June 4, 1944, the Nazis, who were fleeing from Rome after its liberation, carried out the massacre of fourteen prisoners in the community. Twelve of the fourteen were Italians, including the trade unionist Bruno Buozzi; the other two were a Polish Jew and the Englishman John Armstrong. The German soldiers were moving out in a column of vehicles during the night of June 3 to June 4, attempting to escape the Allied advance on the city, and executed the prisoners on the grounds of the Grazioli estate in the country, a forested area 14 km (8.7 mi) down the Via Cassia from La Storta. It is not known who issued the order.

=== Ecclesiastical territory ===
La Storta is the seat of the bishop of the Suburbicarian Diocese of Porto-Santa Rufina, the territory of which stretches from the GRA to the Tyrrhenian Sea.

The Cathedral of the Sacred Hearts of Jesus and Mary (Italian: Cattedrale dei Sacri Cuori di Gesù e Maria) is located in La Storta. The construction of the present-day cathedral building was abandoned in 1926, having been a project of a German Jesuit, Father Leopoldo Fonck, who intended the church to be dedicated to Saint Margaret Mary Alacoque. Construction was suspended, however, and the building was not completed until Cardinal Tisserant took a personal interest and raised funds from sources including the United States. The new cathedral was dedicated on March 25, 1950, hosted a diocesan synod in August 1957, and was visited by Pope Pius XII on October 27 of the same year. In 1990, construction of a diocesan curia building was completed nearby.

== Geography ==
The territory of La Storta includes the urban zone 20H La Storta and part of the urban zone 19G Castelluccia.

It also includes the locality of Pian Saccoccia (piano di zona B49): here is located an unauthorized settlement for which the municipality approved a restoration plan.

=== Boundaries ===
The zone borders, to the north, with Zona Cesano (Z. LII), from which is separated by the Rio Galeria and by Via di Baccanello, up to Via Cassia.

Eastward, it borders with Zona Isola Farnese (Z. LV), whose border is marked by the stretch of Via Cassia between Via di Baccanello and Via Isola Farnese, by Via Isola Farnese itself, by the countryside up to Via Prato della Corte and by Via Prato della Corte up to the Cremera, the by the stream itself To the east, La Storta also borders with Zona La Giustiniana (Z. LIV), whose border is outlined by the Cremera, by Via Anna Foà, by the countryside up to Via Giacomo Andreassi, then by Via Cassia and Via Trionfale, up to the GRA.

To the south, the zone borders with Zona Ottavia (Z. L), from which is separated by the stretch of the GRA between Via Trionfale and Via Cogliate. Southward, La Storta also borders with Zona Casalotti (Z. XLVIII), whose border is outlined by the countryside between Via Cogliate and Via della Storta, by a stretch of Via della Storta itself, then by the countryside up to the Rio Galeria and by the stream itself.

Westward, La Storta borders with Zona Santa Maria di Galeria (Z. XLIX), from which is separated by the Rio Galeria, up to Via Braccianese.

=== Odonymy ===
For the most part, odonyms of La Storta refers to Italian playwrights and theatre directors. In the southern part of the zone, some streets are named after cardinals, saints and religious benefactors. Streets in the locality of Pian Saccoccia are mainly named after prominent publishers. Odonyms of the zone can be categorized as follows:

- Benefactors, e.g. Via Maria Domenica Brun Barbantini, Via Giacomo Cusmano, Via Nicola Mazza;
- Cardinals, e.g. Via Cardinale Andrea Aiuti, Via Cardinale Enrico Dante, Via Cardinale Giacomo Lercaro, Via Cardinale Mario Nasalli Rocca, Via Cardinale Ugo Poletti;
- Directors, e.g. Via Anton Giulio Bragaglia, Via Vittorio De Sica, Via Remigio Paone;
- Local toponyms, e.g. Via di Baccanello, Via del Casale della Castelluccia, Via del Casale di San Nicola, Via del Fosso dell'Olgiata, Via del Fosso Piordo, Via dell'Olgiatella, Via Pian Saccoccia, Via della Storta, Via della Torre delle Cornacchie, Via della Torre di Spizzichino;
- Playwrights, e.g. Via Giuseppe Adami, Via Francesco Albergati Capacelli, Via Giambattista Andreini, Via Giovanni Barrella, Via Libero Bovio, Via Italo Alighiero Chiusano, Via Aldo De Benedetti, Via Leo de Berardinis, Via Giacinto Gallina, Via Paolo Giacometti, Via Gherardo Gherardi, Viale Roberto Lerici, Via Giovanni Battista Lorenzi, Via Antonio Petito, Via Marco Praga, Largo Giorgio Prosperi, Via Annibale Ruccello, Via Giorgio Strehler, Via Vincenzo Tieri, Largo Cesare Vico Lodovici, Via Raffaele Viviani;
- Partisans and war heroes, e.g. Via Carlo Del Papa, Via Amilcare Rossi, Via Luigi Scapuzzi, Via Silvio Solimano, Via Augusto Ugolini, Via Mario Visintini;
- Publishers, e.g. Via Giulio Einaudi, Via Gaston Gallimard, Via Felice Le Monnier, Via Romolo Lozzi, Via Angelo Rizzoli, Via Antonio Zaroto;
- Saints, e.g. Via Gioacchino da Fiore, Largo Padre Pio da Pietrelcina, Via San Giuseppe da Copertino.

== Places of interest ==
=== Civil buildings ===
- Castle of Castelluccia, in Via Carlo Cavina. A 16th-century farmstead. 41.980976°N 12.398946°E

it was built on the ruins of a Roman villa, dating back to the Imperial age, and annexed a 13th-century tower.

- Casali di San Nicola (near the Acquaviva estate), in Via del Casale di San Nicola. 16th-century farmstead. 41.980504°N 12.350169°E
- Villa Incisa della Rocchetta, in Strada G (within the Olgiata residential area). 16th-century villa. 42.035378°N 12.361363°E

formerly, it was the casino di caccia (hunting lodge) of the Olgiata estate.

- Nymphaeum, near the Casino di caccia of the Acquaviva estate, in Via del Casale di Acquaviva. 16th-century fountain. 41.990835°N 12.351623°E
- Villa Bertolami, in Via Maria Domenica Brun Barbantini. 17th-century farmstead. 41.989811°N 12.394746°E
- Secondary farmhouse of the Acquaviva estate, in Via del Casale di San Nicola. 17th-century farmstead. 41.995334°N 12.361416°E
- Casale della Posta Vecchia, in Piazza della Visione. 19th-century farmstead. 42.002630°N 12.382862°E

=== Religious buildings ===
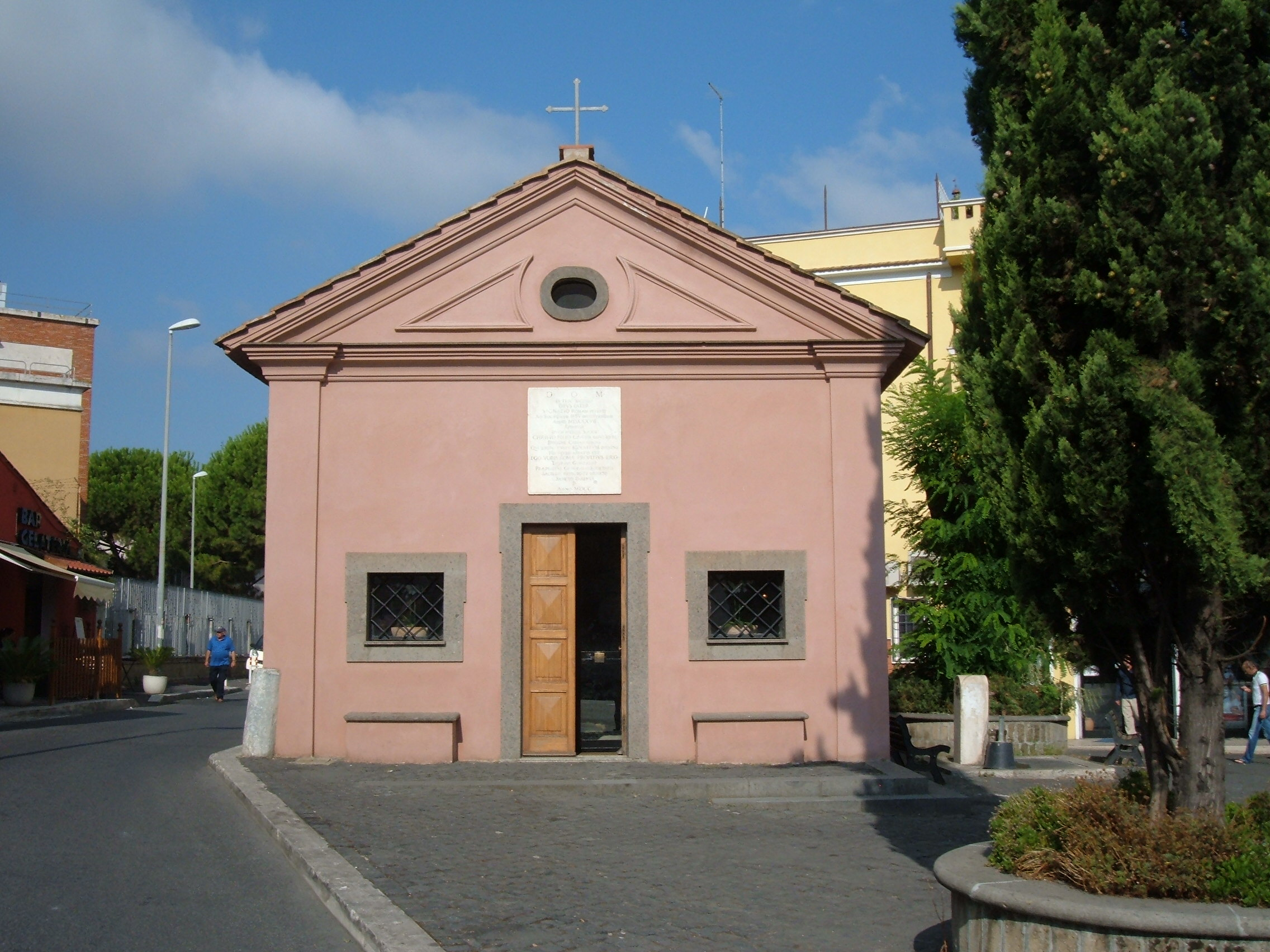
The chapel of Saint Ignatius

- Chapel of the Vision of Saint Ignatius, in Piazza della Visione. 17th-century chapel.
- Cattedrale dei Sacri Cuori di Gesù e Maria, seat of the Roman Catholic Suburbicarian Diocese of Porto-Santa Rufina, in Via del Cenacolo. 20th-century church (1950–56).

=== Military buildings ===
- Santa Rosa military district, the seat of the CINCNAV
- Torre delle Cornacchie, in Via Cassia. 11th-century tower. 41.991814°N 12.394973°E
- Torre di Spizzichino, in Via Cassia. Medieval tower. 41.990345°N 12.398803°E

=== Education ===
The settlement is home to St. George's British International School, founded in 1958.

== See also ==
- List of Jesuit sites

== Notes and references ==
Notes
