= Alfeo Mizzau =

Italian politician

- Alfeo Mizzau

Member of the European Parliament
- In office 1984–1989

Personal details
- Born: 20 March 1926 Beano, Codroipo, Kingdom of Italy
- Died: 14 October 2008 (aged 82) Beano, Codroipo, Italy
- Party: European People's Party
- Education: Ca' Foscari University of Venice
- Occupation: Politician; Economist; Business consultant Author

Alfeo Mizzau (20 March 1926 – 14 October 2008) was an Italian politician and author. A business consultant by trade, in 1945 he joined the Christian Democrats, remaining part of it for decades, in which he dedicated himself to intense political activity. He was a member of the European Parliament from 1984 to 1989.

Mizzau has been credited as having been an important figure for Friuli, having "contributed to the redemption of this land and, above all, convinced that it was necessary to make the Friulians understand what they possessed and the potential not understood and realized."

== Biography ==
Alfeo Mizzau was born on 20 March 1926 in Beano, a fraction of the municipality of Codroipo, in the Friuli-Venezia Giulia region of Italy, to Giovannni Battista and Elsa Urban, into a family of peasants of modest means. He was the third of seven children and, already as a young boy, showed to have to potential to pursue his studies at a higher level. His sister even picked up a job (as a nurse) to raise the money that would allow her brother to enroll at the economy faculty of the Ca' Foscari University of Venice. After his graduation at the Venice university (in business economics), he became a business consultant.

In the 1940s he joined Italian party Christian Democracy, remaining part of it for decades, in which he intensely carried out political activity.

Mizzau was municipal councilor of Codroipo from 1952 to 1970. He was regional councilor of Friuli-Venezia Giulia for 20 consecutive years, from 1964 to 1984, also becoming councilor for local authorities with responsibility for environmental and cultural assets (Italian: Assessore agli enti locali con delega ai beni ambientali e culturali) and then councilor to agriculture.

He was then elected to the European Parliament in 1984, in the second legislature, holding this office until 1989.

He contributed to the opening of the Regional center for the cataloging of environmental and cultural heritage (Centro regionale per la catalogazione dei beni ambientali e culturali) at Villa Manin in Passariano.

In 1968 he contributed to the reopening of the magazine La Panarie. He then contributed to this magazine with his own column, titled Note semiserie. He was president of the Friulian Philological Society (Società filologica friulana) from 1980 to 1994.

In 1992 he suffered a stroke, which severely affected him. Mizzau died in Udine on 14 October 2008, and was buried in his hometown of Beano.

== Works ==
- Lotte contadine in Friuli 1919-23 (1961)
- I cattolici popolari a Codroipo 1913-1987 (1979)
- Salvìn i borcs furlans (1981)
- Cjalait il cîl (1987)
- Caro D’Aronco. Friulani, veneti e lombardi tra leghe, movimenti e partiti (1990)
- Il latte versato. La Democrazia Cristiana e le leghe. Cronaca di un confronto mancato (1992)

== Sources ==
- A. MIZZAU, Lotte contadine in Friuli, 1919-1923, Preface by D. M. Turoldo, Udine, Del Bianco, 1961;
- F. DI BEAN [A. MIZZAU], Il latte versato. La Democrazia cristiana e le Leghe. Cronaca di un confronto mancato, Udine, La Nuova Base, [1993?];
- G.N. MATALON, Mizzau e la Società filologica friulana, «La Vita Cattolica», 25 June 1983;
- D. CORGNALI, Il primo friulano nel Parlamento di Strasburgo, «La Vita Cattolica», 23 June 1984;
- L. PERESSI, Obituary, «MV», 4 November 2008;
- V. ZANON, In ricordo di Feo di Bean, 41/158 (2008), 7–8.
