= Orlando Furioso =

Epic poem by Ludovico Ariosto

Orlando furioso
- by Ludovico Ariosto
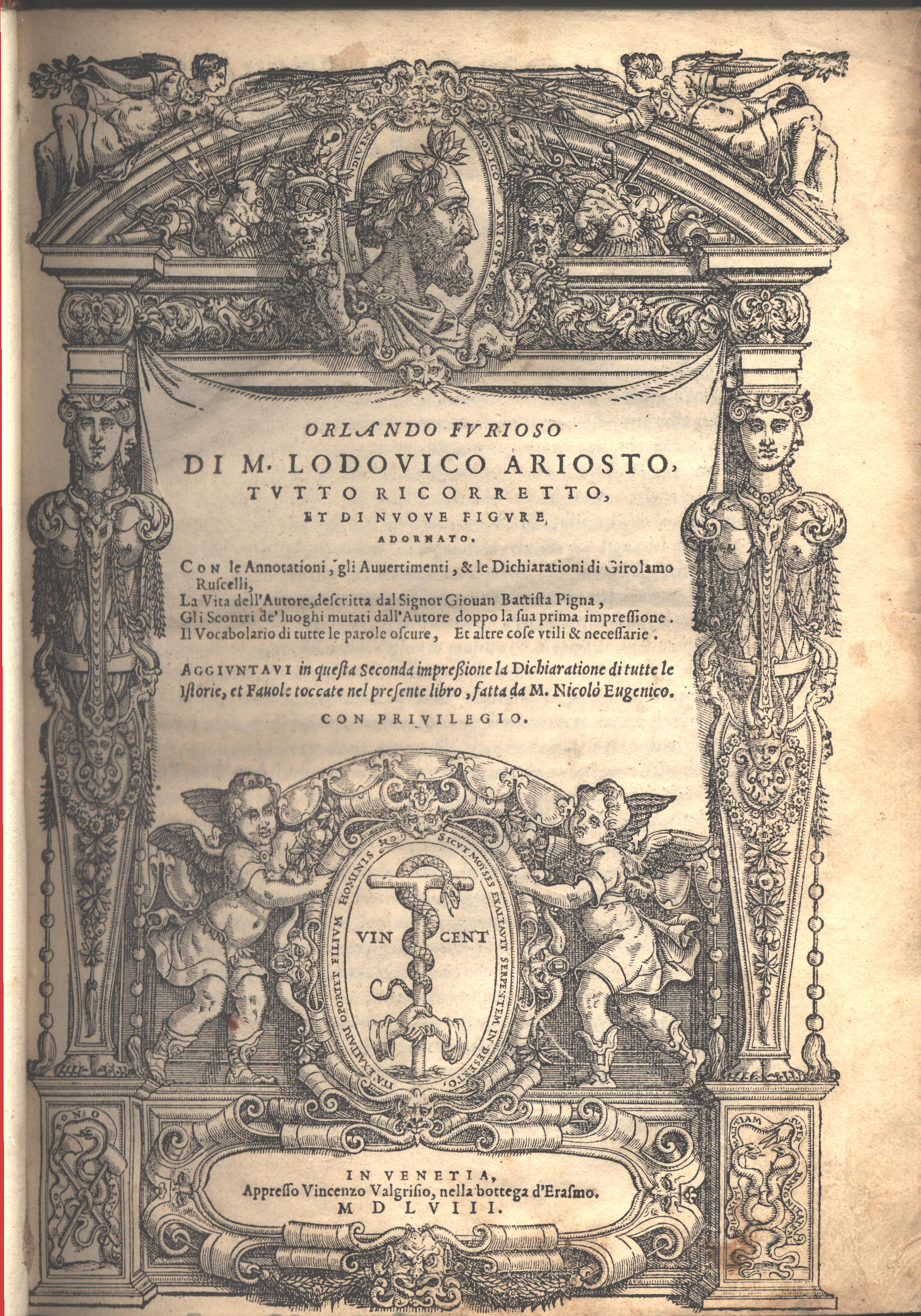
- Orlando Furioso title page, Valgrisi Edition, 1558
- Written: 1506–1532
- First published in: 1516, with revisions in 1521 and 1532
- Country: Duchy of Ferrara
- Language: Italian
- Subject(s): Matter of France, Matter of Britain
- Genre: chivalric romance
- Form: epic poem of 46 cantos
- Meter: ottava rima
- Rhyme scheme: abababcc
- Publication date: 1516, 1521, 1532
- Published in English: 1591
- Media type: print: hardback
- Lines: 38,736
- Preceded by: Orlando innamorato

Full text
- Orlando Furioso at Wikisource

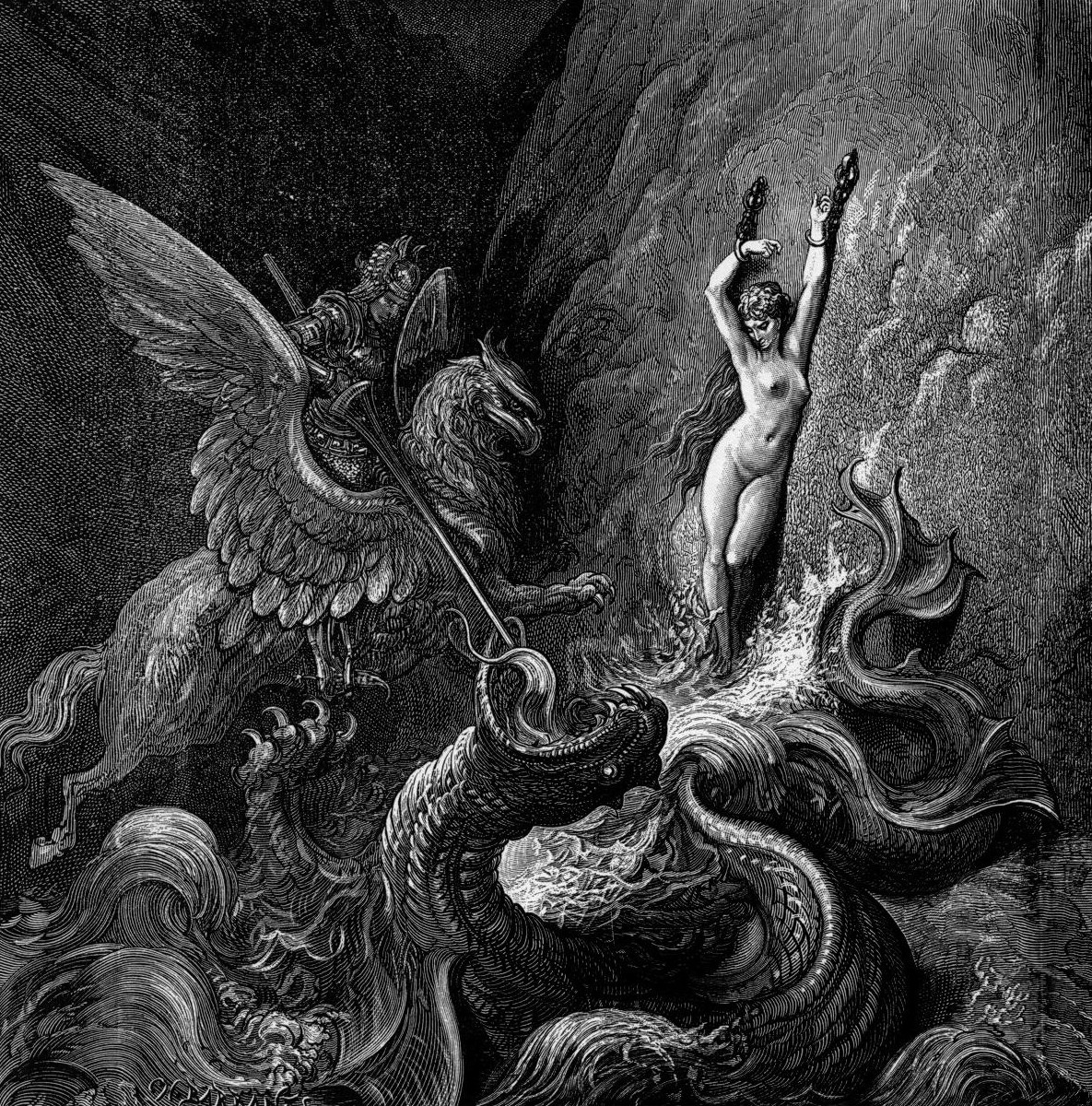
Ruggiero Rescuing Angelica by Gustave Doré

Orlando furioso (Italian pronunciation: [orˈlando fuˈrjoːzo, -so]; The Frenzy of Orlando) is an Italian epic poem by Ludovico Ariosto which has exerted a wide influence on later culture. The earliest version appeared in 1516, although the poem was not published in its complete form until 1532. Orlando furioso is a continuation of Matteo Maria Boiardo's unfinished romance Orlando innamorato (Orlando in Love, published posthumously in 1495). In its historical setting and characters, it shares some features with the Old French La Chanson de Roland of the eleventh century, which tells of the death of Roland. The story is also a chivalric romance which stemmed from a tradition beginning in the Late Middle Ages and continuing in popularity in the 16th century and well into the 17th.

Orlando is the Christian knight known in French and English as Roland. The story takes place against the background of the war between Charlemagne's Christian paladins and the Saracen army that has invaded Europe and is attempting to overthrow the Christian empire. The poem is about knights and ladies, war and love, and the romantic ideal of chivalry. It mixes realism and fantasy, humor and tragedy. The stage is the entire world, plus a trip to the Moon. The large cast of characters features Christians and Saracens, soldiers and sorcerers, and fantastic creatures including a gigantic sea monster called the Orc and a flying horse called the hippogriff. Many themes are interwoven in its complicated episodic structure, but the most important are the paladin Orlando's unrequited love for the pagan princess Angelica, which drives him mad; the love between the female Christian warrior Bradamante and the Saracen Ruggiero, who are supposed to be the ancestors of Ariosto's patrons, the House of Este of Ferrara; and the war between Christian and Infidel.

The poem is divided into forty-six cantos which contain a varying number of eight-line stanzas in ottava rima (a rhyme scheme of abababcc). Ottava rima had been used in previous Italian romantic epics, including Luigi Pulci's Morgante and Boiardo's Orlando Innamorato. Ariosto's work is 38,736 lines long in total, making it one of the longest poems in European literature.

== Composition and publication ==
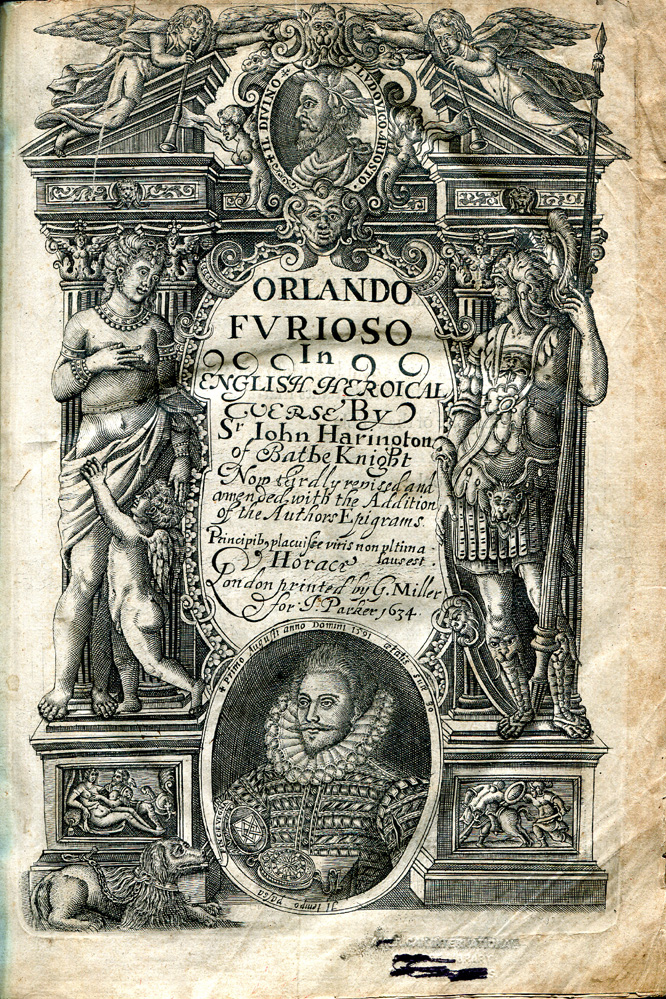
Title page of the third edition of John Harington's translation of Orlando Furioso, 1634. The first edition was 1591.

Ariosto began working on the poem around 1506, when he was 32. The first edition of the poem, in 40 cantos, was published in Ferrara in April 1516 and dedicated to the poet's patron Ippolito d'Este. A second edition appeared in 1521 with minor revisions.

Ariosto continued to write more material for the poem and in the 1520s he produced five more cantos, marking a further development of his poetry, which he decided not to include in the final edition. They were published after his death by his illegitimate son Virginio under the title Cinque canti and are highly regarded by some modern critics. The third and final version of Orlando Furioso, containing 46 cantos, appeared in 1532.

Ariosto had sought stylistic advice from the humanist Pietro Bembo to give his verse the last degree of polish and this is the version known to posterity.

The first English translation by John Harington was published in 1591 at the behest of Queen Elizabeth I, who reportedly banned Harington from court until the translation was complete.

== Ariosto and Boiardo ==
Ariosto's poem is a sequel to Matteo Maria Boiardo's Orlando Innamorato (Orlando in Love). One of Boiardo's main achievements was his fusion of the Matter of France (the tradition of stories about Charlemagne and paladins such as Roland) with the Matter of Britain (the legends about King Arthur and his knights). The latter contained the magical elements and love interest that were generally lacking in the more austere and warlike poems about Carolingian heroes.

Ariosto continued to mix these elements in his poem as well as adding material derived from Classical sources. However, Ariosto has an ironic tone rarely present in Boiardo, who treated the ideals of chivalry much more seriously. In Orlando Furioso, instead of the chivalric ideals which were no longer current in the 16th century, a humanistic conception of man and life is vividly celebrated under the appearance of a fantastical world, notwithstanding his early modern approaches to feminism.

== Plot ==
The action of Orlando Furioso takes place against the background of the war between the Christian emperor Charlemagne and the Saracen king of Africa, Agramante, who has invaded Europe to avenge the death of his father Troiano. Agramante and his allies – who include Marsilio, the King of Spain, and the boastful warrior Rodomonte – besiege Charlemagne in Paris.

Meanwhile, Orlando, Charlemagne's most famous paladin, has been tempted to forget his duty to protect the emperor because of his love for the pagan princess Angelica. At the beginning of the poem, Angelica escapes from the castle of the Bavarian Duke Namo, and Orlando sets off in pursuit. The two meet with various adventures until Angelica comes across a wounded Saracen infantryman on the verge of death, Medoro. She nurses him back to health, falls in love, and elopes with him to Cathay.

When Orlando learns the truth, by finding the pair's secret garden of love, or Locus Amoenus, he goes mad with despair and rampages through Europe and Africa destroying everything in his path, and thus demonstrates the frenzy that the title suggests. The English knight Astolfo journeys to Ethiopia on the hippogriff to find a cure for Orlando's madness.

He flies up in Elijah's flaming chariot to the Moon, where everything lost on Earth is to be found, including Orlando's wits. He brings them back in a bottle and makes Orlando sniff them, thus restoring him to sanity. (At the same time Orlando falls out of love with Angelica, as the author explains that love is itself a form of insanity.)

Orlando joins with Brandimarte and Oliver to fight Agramante, Sobrino and Gradasso on the island of Lampedusa that belongs to the archipelago of the Pelagie Islands, in Sicily. There Orlando kills King Agramante.

Another important plotline involves the love between the female Christian warrior Bradamante and the Saracen Ruggiero. They too have to endure many vicissitudes.

Ruggiero is taken captive by the sorceress Alcina and has to be freed from her magic island. He then rescues Angelica from the orc. He also has to avoid the enchantments of his foster father, the wizard Atlante, who does not want him to fight or see the world outside of his iron castle, because looking into the stars it is revealed that if Ruggiero converts himself to Christianity, he will die. He does not know this, so when he finally gets the chance to marry Bradamante, as they had been looking for each other through the entire poem although something always separated them, he converts to Christianity and marries Bradamante.

Rodomonte appears at the wedding feast, nine days after the wedding, and accuses him of being a traitor to the Saracen cause, and the poem ends with a duel between Rodomonte and Ruggiero. Ruggiero kills Rodomonte (Canto XLVI, stanza 140) and the final lines of the poem describe Rodomonte's spirit leaving the world. Ruggiero and Bradamante are the ancestors of the House of Este, Ariosto's patrons, whose genealogy he gives at length in canto 3 of the poem.

The epic contains many other characters, including Orlando's cousin, the paladin Rinaldo, who is also in love with Angelica; the thief Brunello; the Saracen Ferraù; Sacripante, King of Circassia and a leading Saracen knight; and the tragic heroine Isabella.

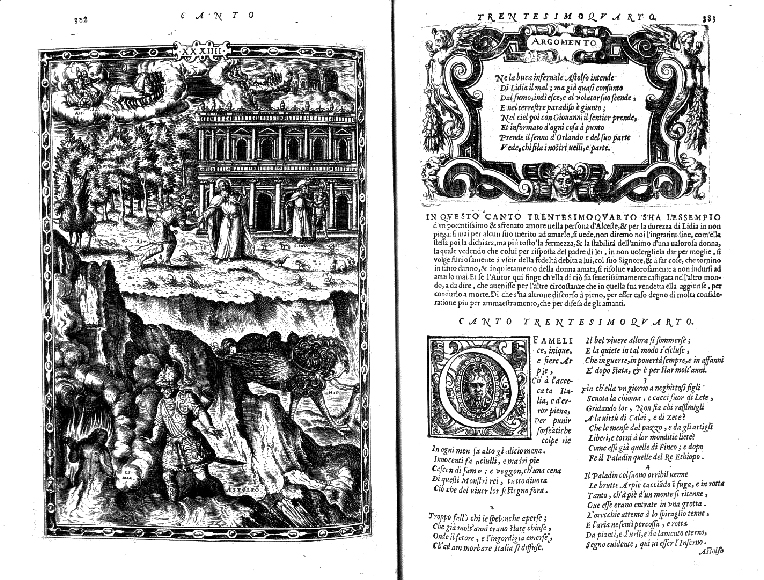
Page from 1565 edition of Orlando Furioso by Francesco Franceschi

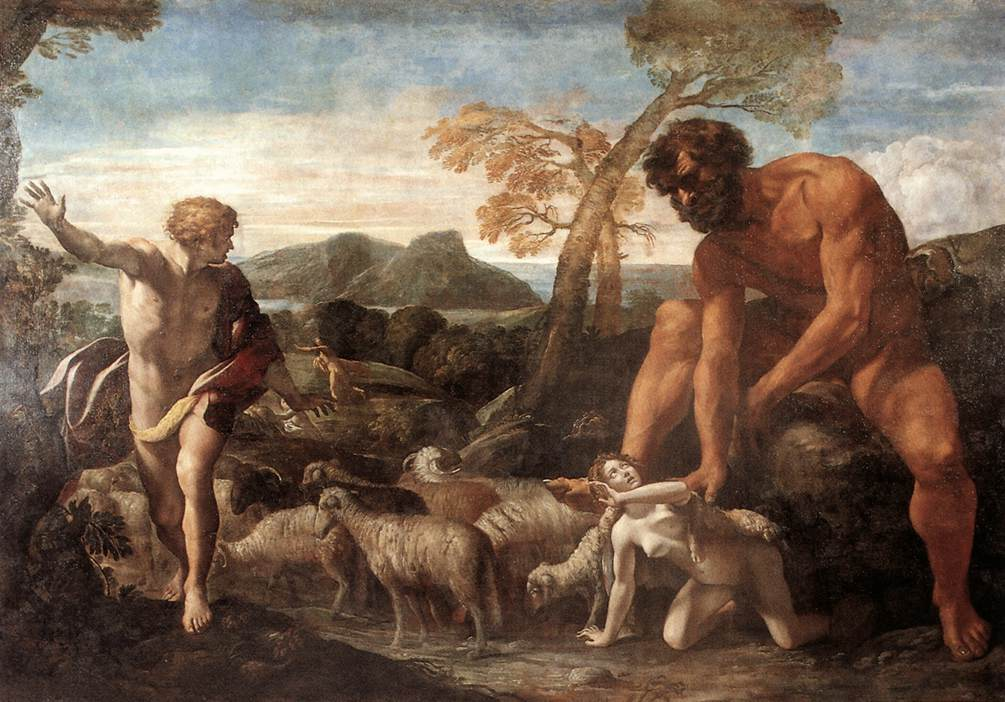
Norandino and Lucina Discovered by the Ogre, from Canto XVII, by Giovanni Lanfranco, 1624

== Influence ==
=== Later literature ===
Orlando Furioso is "one of the most influential works in the whole of European literature" and it remains an inspiration for writers to this day.

A few years before Ariosto's death, the poet Teofilo Folengo published his Orlandino, a caricaturization of the stories found in both Orlando Furioso and its precursor, Orlando Innamorato.

In 1554, Laura Terracina wrote the Discorso sopra il Principio di tutti i canti d'Orlando furioso which was linked to Orlando Furioso and in which several of the characters appeared.

Orlando Furioso was a major influence on Edmund Spenser's epic The Faerie Queene. William Shakespeare's Much Ado About Nothing takes one of its plots (Hero/Claudio/Don John) from Orlando Furioso (probably via Spenser or Bandello). In 1592, Robert Greene published a play called The Historie of Orlando Furioso. According to Barbara Reynolds, the English poet closest in spirit to Ariosto is Lord Byron.

In Spain, Lope de Vega wrote a continuation of the epic (La hermosura de Angélica, 1602) as did Luis Barahona de Soto (Las lágrimas de Angélica, 1586). Góngora wrote a famous poem describing the idyllic honeymoon of Angelica and Medoro (En un pastoral albergue). Orlando Furioso is mentioned among the romances in Don Quixote. Among the interpolated stories within Don Quixote is a retelling of a tale from canto 43 regarding a man who tests the fidelity of his wife. Additionally, various literary critics have noted the poem's likely influence on Garcilaso de la Vega's second eclogue.

In France, Jean de la Fontaine used the plots of some of the bawdier episodes for three of his Contes et Nouvelles en vers (1665–66).

In chapter 11 of Sir Walter Scott's novel Rob Roy published in 1817, but set circa 1715, Mr. Francis Osbaldistone talks of completing "my unfinished version of Orlando Furioso, a poem which I longed to render into English verse...".

Virginia Woolf's eponymous historical romance Orlando (1928) is intricately structured by permutations of many elements of Ariosto's poem.

The modern Russian poet Osip Mandelstam paid tribute to Orlando Furioso in his poem Ariosto (1933).

The Italian novelist Italo Calvino drew on Ariosto for several of his works of fiction including Il cavaliere inesistente ("The Nonexistent Knight", 1959) and Il castello dei destini incrociati ("The Castle of Crossed Destinies", 1973). In 1970 Calvino brought out his own selection of extracts from the poem.

The Argentine writer Jorge Luis Borges was an admirer of Orlando and included a poem, Ariosto y los árabes (Ariosto and the Arabs), exploring the relationship between the epic and the Arabian Nights, in his 1960 collection El hacedor. Borges also chose Attilio Momigliano's critical study of the work as one of the hundred volumes that were to make up his Personal Library.

The English novelist Anthony Powell's Hearing Secret Harmonies includes images from Orlando Furioso to open chapter two. Hearing Secret Harmonies is the final book in Powell's twelve-volume series, A Dance to the Music of Time.

British writer Salman Rushdie's 2008 novel The Enchantress of Florence was partly inspired by Orlando Furioso.

=== Popular fiction ===
Bradamante is one of the main characters in several novels, including Linda C. McCabe's Quest of the Warrior Maiden, Ron Miller's Bradamant: The Iron Tempest and Ruth Berman's Bradamant's Quest.

Science fiction writer Theodore Sturgeon's 1954 short story "To Here and the Easel" is an assembly of portions of the Orlando story intermixed with a current-day recasting of the story into the lives of a painter suffering from artist's block (Ruggiero/Rogero and his analog Giles), a mysterious faithful supporter (Bradamante and her analog Miss Brandt) and her jaded, fabulously wealthy employer (Angelica appearing as an echo more than an analog) and Giles' redemption (breaking his blockage) at the hands of Miss Brandt. The story first appeared in 1954 in "Star Short Novels" (a Ballantine collection which was not reprinted), and was republished as the first story in the collection Sturgeon Is Alive And Well... in 1971.

The Castle of Iron, a fantasy novel by L. Sprague de Camp and Fletcher Pratt, takes place in the "universe" of Orlando Furioso. It was the third story (and afterwards the second volume) in their Harold Shea series.

=== Music ===
In the Baroque era, the poem was the basis of many operas. Among the earliest were Francesca Caccini's La liberazione di Ruggiero dall'isola d'Alcina ("The Liberation of Ruggiero from Alcina's Island", 1625), Luigi Rossi's Il palazzo incantato (1642), Agostino Steffani's Orlando generoso (1691) and André Campra's Alcine (1705). Antonio Vivaldi, as an impresario as well as a composer, staged three operas on themes from Ariosto: Orlando furioso (1713) by Giovanni Alberto Ristori, Orlando Furioso (1714), with music by Ristori and by himself, and Orlando (1727). Perhaps the most famous operas inspired by the poem are those by Handel: Orlando (1733), Ariodante and Alcina (1735). In France, Jean-Baptiste Lully turned to Ariosto for his tragédie en musique Roland (1685). Rameau's comic opera Les Paladins (1760) is based on a story in canto 18 of Orlando (though Rameau's librettist derived the plot indirectly via La Fontaine's Contes). The enthusiasm for operas based on Ariosto continued into the Classical era and beyond with such examples as Johann Adolph Hasse’s Il Ruggiero (1771), Niccolò Piccinni's Roland (1778), Haydn's Orlando paladino (1782), Méhul's Ariodant (1799) and Simon Mayr's Ginevra di Scozia (1801). Ambroise Thomas wrote a comedic one-act, Angélique et Médor, in 1843. Augusta Holmès wrote her orchestral work Roland Furieux in 1876.

=== Art ===
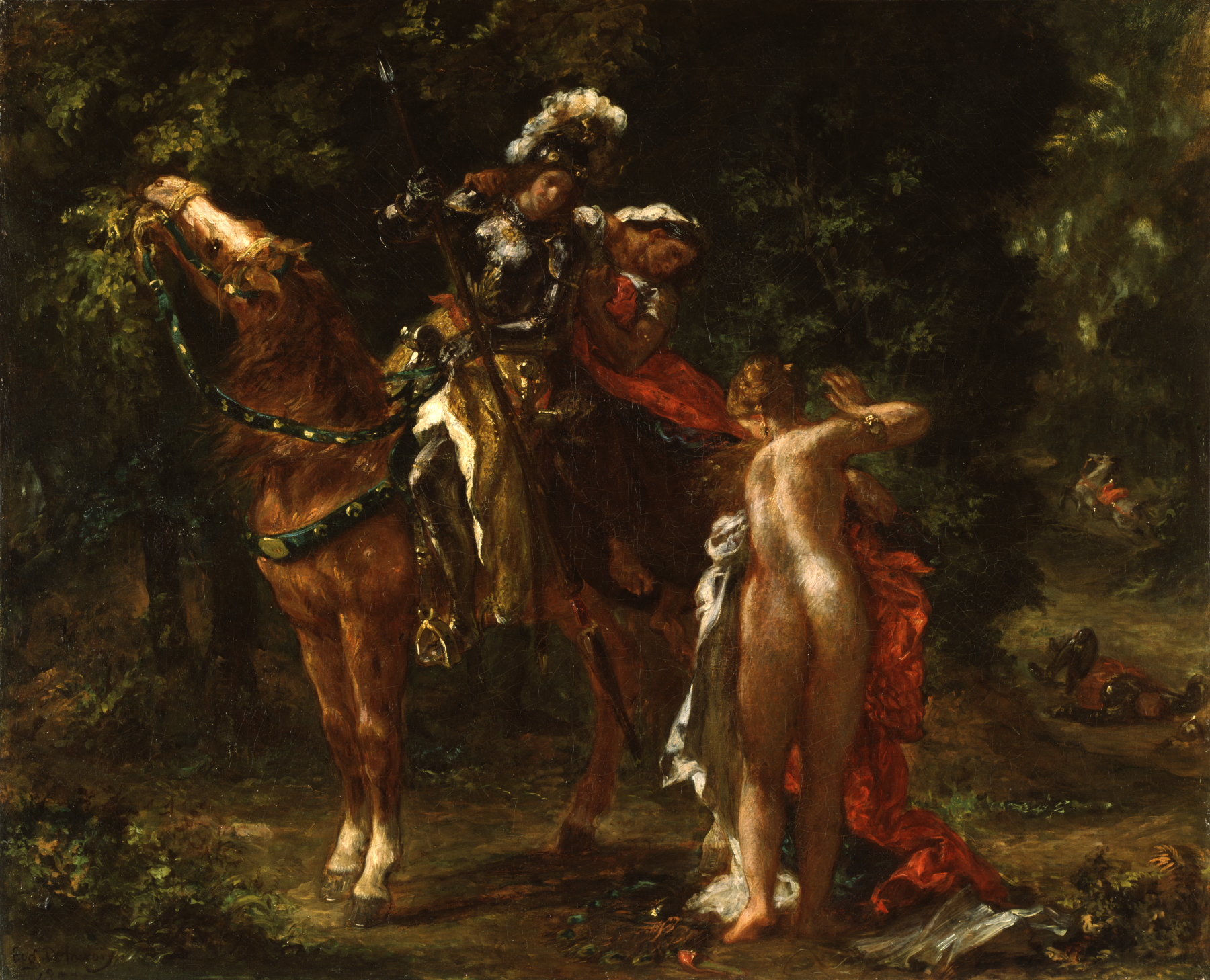
Marphise by Eugène Delacroix, 1852 (Walters Art Museum)

Orlando Furioso has been the inspiration for many works of art, including paintings by Eugène Delacroix, Tiepolo, Ingres, Redon, and a series of illustrations by Gustave Doré.

In his poem Ludovico Ariosto relates how Marphise, the woman warrior, knocks the knight Pinabello off his horse after his lady had mocked Marphise's companion, the old woman Gabrina. In Marphise by Eugène Delacroix, Pinabello lies on the ground, and his horse gallops off in the distance. The knight's lady, meanwhile, is forced to disrobe and give her fancy clothing to Gabrina. Marphise's horse, undisturbed by the drama, nonchalantly munches on the leaves overhead.

=== Other ===
In 1975, Luca Ronconi directed an Italian television mini-series based on Orlando Furioso, starring Massimo Foschi (it) as Orlando, and Ottavia Piccolo as Angelica.

In the late 1960s / early 1970s, the Bob and Ray comedy parody radio show Mary Backstayge, Noble Wife centered around the Backstayge's stage production of the fictional play "Westchester Furioso", an updating of Orlando Furioso that somehow involved musical numbers, tap dancing and ping pong.

In 1966, Italian Disney comics artist Luciano Bottaro wrote a parody of Orlando Furioso starring Donald Duck, Paperin Furioso. In the film Moonstruck there is a reference to one of the character's rejuvenation as a lover as feeling like "Orlando Furioso".

Emanuele Luzzati's animated short film, I paladini di Francia, together with Giulio Gianini, in 1960, was turned into the children's picture-story book, with verse narrative, I Paladini de Francia ovvero il tradimento di Gano di Maganz, which translates literally as “The Paladins of France or the treachery of Gano of Maganz” (Ugo Mursia Editore, 1962). This was then republished, in English, as Ronald and the Wizard Calico (1969). The Picture Lion paperback edition (William Collins, London, 1973) is a paperback imprint of the Hutchinson Junior Books edition (1969), which credits the English translation to Hutchinson Junior Books.

Luzatti's original verse story in Italian is about the plight of a beautiful maiden called Biancofiore – White Flower, or Blanchefleur – and her brave hero, Captain Rinaldo, and Ricardo and his paladins – the term used for Christian knights engaged in Crusades against the Saracens and Moore. Battling with these good people are the wicked Moors – North African Muslims and Arabs – and their Sultan, in Jerusalem. With the assistance of the wicked and treacherous magician, Gano of Maganz, Biancofiore is stolen from her fortress castle, and taken to become the reluctant wife of the Sultan. The catalyst for victory is the good magician, Urlubulu, who lives in a lake, and flies through the air on the back of his magic blue bird. The English translators, using the original illustrations, and the basic rhyme patterns, slightly simplify the plot, changing the Christians-versus-Muslim-Moors conflict into a battle between good and bad magicians and between golden knights and green knights. The French traitor in The Song of Roland, who is actually Roland's cowardly step-father, is Ganelon – very likely the inspiration for Luzzati's traitor and wicked magician, Gano. Orlando Furioso (literally, Furious or Enraged Orlando, or Roland), includes Orlando's cousin, the paladin Rinaldo, who, like Orlando, is also in love with Angelica, a pagan princess. Rinaldo is, of course, the Italian equivalent of Ronald. Flying through the air on the back of a magic bird is equivalent to flying on a magic hippogriff.

In 2014, Enrico Maria Giglioli created Orlando's Wars: lotta tra cavalieri, a trading card game with characters and situations of the poem, divided in four categories: Knight, Maiden, Wizard and Fantastic Creature.

The poem appears as a Great Work of Literature in the video game Civilization V.

In the South Korean video game Library of Ruina, several characters are named after characters from the poem and Innamorato-Roland is a protagonist, his deceased wife is named Angelica, and his brother-in-law and a major antagonist is named Argalia.

Astolfo appears as a servant in Fate/Apocrypha and Fate/Grand Order, with multiple references to his depictions within the poem.

The word rodomontade, meaning boastful or inflated talk or behavior, entered the English language in the early 1600s from Italian. It is based on this work's boastful warrior, Rodomonte.

== Analysis ==
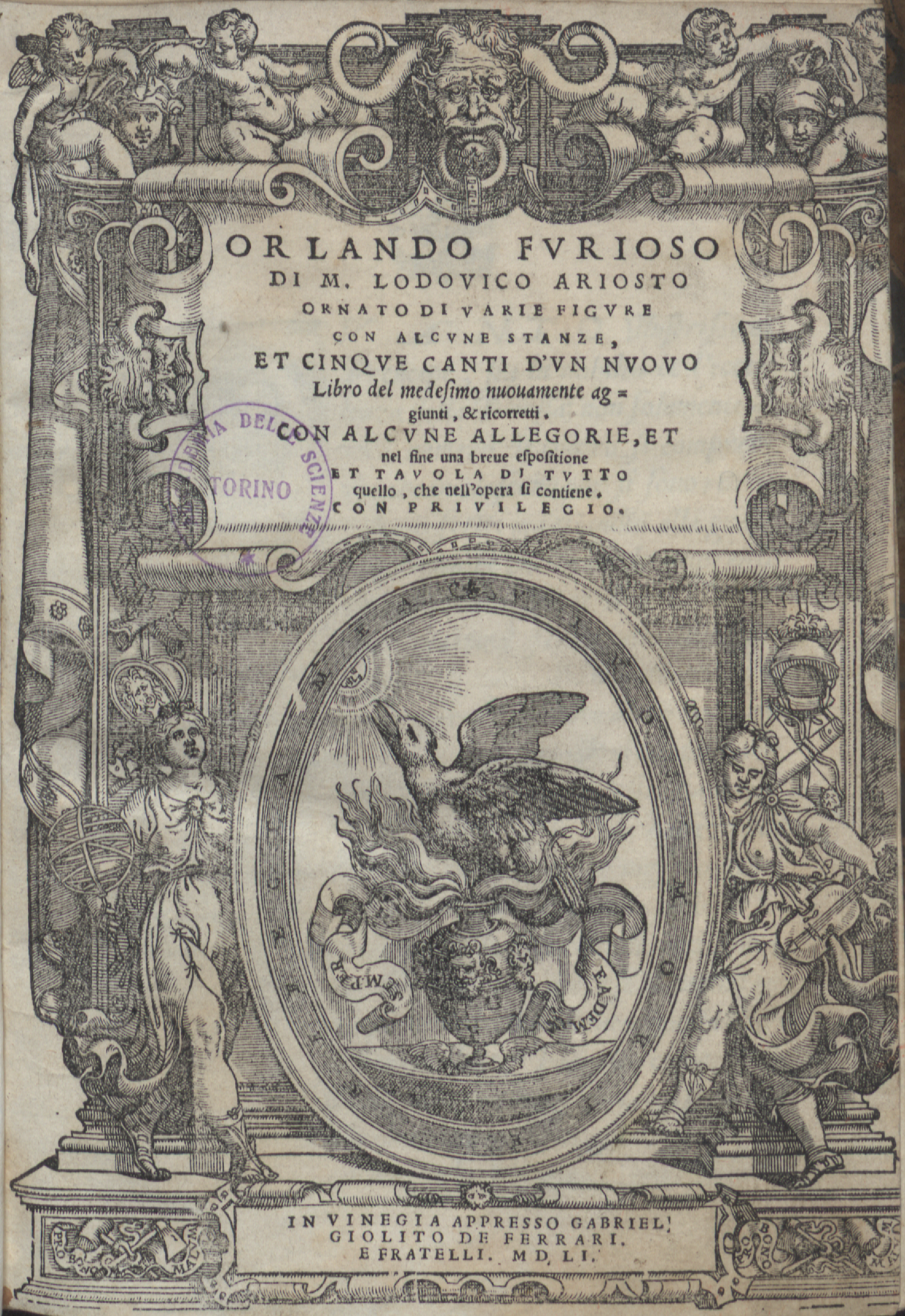
Orlando Furioso, 1551

Orlando Furioso won immediate fame. Around the middle of the 16th century, some Italian critics such as Gian Giorgio Trissino complained that the poem failed to observe the unity of action as defined by Aristotle, by having multiple plots rather than a single main story. The French poet Pierre de Ronsard and the Italian poet Torquato Tasso both felt that Orlando Furioso lacked structural unity. Ariosto's defenders, such as Giovanni Battista Giraldi, replied that it was not a Classical epic but a romanzo, a genre unknown to Aristotle; therefore his standards were irrelevant. Nevertheless, the strictures of the Classical critics influenced the next great Italian epic, Torquato Tasso's Gerusalemme Liberata (1581). Tasso tried to combine Ariosto's freedom of invention with a more unified plot structure. In the following decades, Italian critics argued over the respective merits of the two epics. Partisans of Orlando, such as Galileo Galilei, praised its psychological realism and the naturalness of its language. In the 19th century, Hegel considered that the work's many allegories and metaphors did not serve merely to refute the ideal of chivalry, but also to demonstrate the fallacy of human senses and judgment. Francesco de Sanctis and Attilio Momigliano (it) also wrote about Orlando Furioso.

The story resembles the myth of Andromeda and Perseus, and in particular the scene where a woman is chained to a rock on the sea as a sacrifice to a sea monster, and is rescued at the last moment, is essentially indistinguishable.

== Translations ==
There have been several verse translations of Orlando Furioso into English, most using the 8-line stanzas (octaves) of the original (abababcc). The first one was by John Harington, published in 1591 and slightly revised in 1634. Temple Henry Croker's translation, misattributed to William Huggins' and Henry Boyd's translation were published in 1757 and 1784, respectively. John Hoole's 1783 translation used rhyming couplets (AABBCC...). William Stewart Rose produced an eight-volume translation beginning publication in 1823 and ending in 1831. Barbara Reynolds published a verse translation in 1975, and an abridged verse translation by David Slavitt was published in 2009, which was then made complete by a second volume containing the lacunae missing from the abridgement, in 2012.

A few translations have also been made into prose. A. H. Gilbert's translation was published by Duke University Press in 1954. Richard Hodgens planned a multivolume translation, whose first volume, subtitled The Ring of Angelica, was published by Ballantine Books as the fifty-fourth volume of its Ballantine Adult Fantasy series in January, 1973. The Ballantine Adult Fantasy series came to an end in 1974; no further volumes of the Hodgens translation were published. Guido Waldman's complete prose translation was first published by Oxford University Press in 1973.

A comparison of the original text of Book 1, Canto 1 with various translations into English is given in the following table:

Author/translator	Date	Text
Lodovico Ariosto	1516/1532	Le donne, i cavallier, l'arme, gli amori Le cortesie, l'audaci imprese io canto; Che furo al tempo, che passaro i Mori; D'Africa il mare, e in Francia nocquer tanto; Seguendo l'ire, e i giovenil furori D'Agramante lor Re, che si diè vanto Di vendicar la morte di Troiano; Sopra Re Carlo Imperador Romano.
Sir John Harington	1591	Of Dames, of Knights, of armes, of loues delight, Of courtesies, of high attempts I speake, Then when the Moores transported all their might On Affrick seas the force of France to breake: Drawne by the youthfull heate and raging spite, Of Agramant their king, that vowd to wreake The death of King Trayana (lately slayne); Vpon the Romane Emperour Charlemaine.
Sir John Harington	1634 edition	Of Dames, of Knights, of armes, of loves delight, Of courtesies, of high attempts I speake, Then when the Moores transported all their might On Africke seas, the force of France to breake: Incited by the youthfull heate and spight Of Agramant their king, that vow'd to wreake The death of King Trayano (lately slaine); Vpon the Romane Emperour Charlemaine.
Temple Henry Croker, attr. William Huggins	1757	Of ladies, cavaliers, of arms and love, Their courtesies, their bold exploits, I sing, When over Afric's sea the Moor did move, On France's realm such ruin vast to bring; While they the youthful ire and fury strove Of Agramant to follow, boastful King, That of Trojano he'd revenge the doom, On Charlemain, the Emperor of Rome.
John Hoole	1783	Dames, knights, and arms, and love! The deeds that spring From courteous minds, and venturous feats, I sing! What time the Moors from Afric's hostile strand Had crost the seas to ravage Gallia's land, By Agramant, their youthful monarch, led In deep resentment for Troyano dead, With threats on Charlemain t'avenge his fate, Th'imperial guardian of the Roman state.
William Stewart Rose	1823	OF LOVES and LADIES, KNIGHTS and ARMS, I sing, Of COURTESIES, and many a DARING FEAT; And from those ancient days my story bring, When Moors from Afric passed in hostile fleet, And ravaged France, with Agramant their king, Flushed with his youthful rage and furious heat; Who on king Charles', the Roman emperor's head Had vowed due vengeance for Troyano dead.
Barbara Reynolds	1975	Of ladies, cavaliers, of love and war, Of courtesies and of brave deeds I sing, In times of high endeavour when the Moor; Had crossed the seas from Africa to bring Great harm to France, when Agramante swore In wrath, being now the youthful Moorish king, To avenge Troiano, who was lately slain, Upon the Roman Emperor Charlemagne.
David R. Slavitt	2009	Of ladies, knights, of passions and of wars, of courtliness, and of valiant deeds I sing that took place in that era when the Moors crossed the sea from Africa to bring such troubles to France. I shall tell of the greatest stores of rage in the heart of Agramant, the king who swore revenge on Charlemagne who had murdered King Troiano (Agramant's dad).

== Sources ==
- Everson, Jane E.; Hiscock, A.; Jossa, S., eds. (2019). Ariosto, the Orlando Furioso, and English Culture. Oxford, UK: Oxford University Press.
- Greene, Robert. The History of Orlando Furioso (1594) (complete e‑text). Luminarius Editions.
- Orlando Furioso (verse). Translated by Reynolds, B. Penguin Classics. 1975. volumes I–II: Part one. cantos 1–23. ISBN 0-14-044311-8; Part two. cantos 24–46. ISBN 0-14-044310-X. (Part one has since been reprinted.)
- Robin, Diana Maury; Larsen, Anne R.; Levin, Carole (2007). Encyclopedia of women in the Renaissance: Italy, France, and England. ABC-CLIO – via Internet Archive (archive.org).
- Orlando Furioso: A new verse translation. Translated by Slavitt, David. Harvard University Press. 2009. ISBN 978-0-674-03535-5.
- Lacunae: The missing cantos & stanzas of Ariosto's Orlando Furioso. Translated by Slavitt, David. Outpost19. 2012. ISBN 978-1-937402-25-9.
- Turchi, Marcello, ed. (1974). Orlando Furioso. Garzanti.
- Orlando Furioso (prose). Translated by Waldman, Guido. Oxford University Press. 1999. ISBN 0-19-283677-3.
- Waley, Pamela, ed. (1975). Orlando Furioso: A selection. Manchester University Press.
