= Italo Alighiero Chiusano =

Silesian writer and historian (1926–1995)

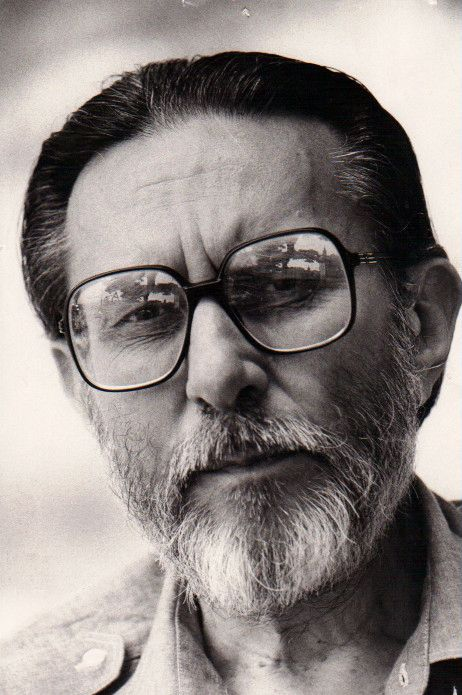
- Born: 10 June 1926; Wrocław, Germany (now Poland)
- Died: 15 February 1995 (aged 68); Frascati, Italy
- Occupations: writer, literary critic, Germanist

Italo Alighiero Chiusano (10 June 1926 – 15 February 1995) was an Italian independent writer, literary critic, Germanist, literary historian, essayist, author of dramas, and journalist.

Chiusano authored several television screenplays.

== Biography and works ==
Chiusano was born at Wrocław, in the Silesia, a German territory that became part of Poland after the Second World War. However, his origin was Italian: Chiusano's father was a diplomat from Pinerolo and his mother was from Turin.

Chiusano's intellectual formation was heavily influenced by the German language; he studied and wrote literary criticism of German literature.

He wrote articles for the Italian newspapers La Stampa and L'Osservatore Romano. In the newspaper La Repubblica he published a series of articles on famous authors of the German school. These articles discussed the work of Thomas Bernhard, Heinrich Böll (whose religiosity and anti-militarism was a common feature, and on whom he wrote a biography in 1974), Goethe, Schiller, Kleist, Theodor Fontane, Musil, Schnitzler, Mann, Dürrenmatt, and many others.

Chiusano had a Catholic education (he was defined by Vittorio Messori "open minded Christian"), and was fluent in German, French, English, Spanish and Portuguese. He spent his childhood and youth traveling throughout Europe and Brazil (Ajaccio, Stuttgart, Rotterdam, São Paulo were some of the cities where he lived).

He attended high school in Brazil and in 1948 he graduated in law in Rome. In the early 1950s he worked as a journalist, translator, and author of dramas for radio.

In 1964 he married Leyla Givonetti, with whom he had a son, Mattia, and a daughter, Agata.

As a writer he possessed a dry and incisive style. His historical novel L'ordalia, set in medieval times, was a finalist for the 1979 Campiello prize. Among his other major works of fiction are: La prova dei sentimenti (1966), Inchiesta sul mio amore (1972), L'ordalia (1979), set in Italy during the lives of Arduin and Otto III, La derrota (1982), Il vizio del gambero (1986), Konradin (1990, a portrait of Conradin) and Eroi di vetro (1989).

As essayist and literary critic he was the author in 1976 of a history of modern German theater and, in 1981, a Life of Goethe. For the theater he wrote Le notti di Verna (1981) and Il Sacrilegio (1982).

Furthermore, he was the author of Literatur, published in 1984 and containing almost two hundred articles devoted to his beloved German literature, and Altre lune (1987), a collection of articles on German, British, Russian, Spanish, and Latin American writers in addition to specific pages on two Italian poets, Mario Luzi and Giorgio Caproni.

In the 1970s and 1980s he was co-writer of some fictions broadcast by RAI (Italian state television), inspired from famous authors and dedicated to great literary characters or themes:

- I Buddenbroock (1971)
- Orfeo in paradiso (1971)
- Il giudice e il suo boia (1972)
- Le affinità elettive (1979)
- Don Luigi Sturzo (1981)

Chiusano died at Frascati in 1995.
