= Société des anciens textes français =

Société des anciens textes français (SATF) is a text publication society founded in Paris in 1875 with the purpose of publishing all kinds of medieval documents written either in langue d'oïl or langue d'oc (Bulletin de la SATF, 1 (1875), p. 1). Its founding members are Henri Bordier, Joseph de Laborde, A. Lamarle, Paul Meyer, Léopold Pannier, Gaston Paris, Auguste-Henry-Édouard, marquis de Queux de Saint-Hilaire, baron Arthur de Rothschild, baron Edmond de Rothschild, baron James N. de Rothschild and Natalis de Wailly.

From 1875 to 1936, the SATF published a yearly bulletin distributed to its members only.

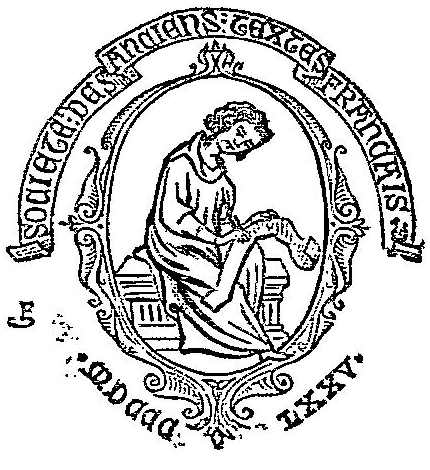
Publisher's mark Society of ancient French texts

Since its foundation, the SATF have also published a series of critical editions and even, sometimes, facsimile editions, a series that amounts today to approximately 180 volumes.

== Published works ==
Date	Title	Editor	Digital copies
1875	Chansons du XVe siècle	Gaston Paris and François-Auguste Gevaert	Internet Archive
1875	Les plus anciens monuments de la langue française (IXe, Xe siècles)	Gaston Paris	Gallica
1875	Brun de la Montaigne	Paul Meyer	Gallica
1876	Guillaume de Palerne	Henri Michelant	Google Books
1876	Deux rédactions du Roman des Sept Sages de Rome	Gaston Paris	Gallica
1876	Miracles de Nostre Dame par personnages, vol. 1	Gaston Paris and Ulysse Robert	Gallica
1877	Miracles de Nostre Dame par personnages, vol. 2	Gaston Paris and Ulysse Robert	Gallica
1877	Aiol	Jacques Normand and Gaston Raynaud	Gallica
1878	Le débat des hérauts de France et d'Angleterre, suivi de The Debate between the Heralds of England and France by John Coke	Léopold Pannier and Paul Meyer	Gallica
1878	Miracles de Nostre Dame par personnages, vol. 3	Gaston Paris and Ulysse Robert	Gallica
1878	Oeuvres complètes d'Eustache Deschamps, vol. 1	Auguste-Henry-Édouard, marquis de Queux de Saint-Hilaire	Gallica
1878	Le saint voyage de Jherusalem du seigneur d'Anglure	François Bonnardot and Auguste Longnon	Gallica
1879	Miracles de Nostre Dame par personnages, vol. 4	Gaston Paris and Ulysse Robert	Gallica
1879	Chronique du Mont-Saint-Michel, vol. 1	Siméon Luce	Gallica
1879	Elie de Saint-Gille	Gaston Raynaud and Eugène Koelbing	Gallica
1880	Miracles de Nostre Dame par personnages, vol. 5	Gaston Paris and Ulysse Robert	Gallica
1880	Daurel et Beton	Paul Meyer	Gallica
1880	Oeuvres complètes d'Eustache Deschamps, vol. 2	Auguste-Henry-Édouard, marquis de Queux de Saint-Hilaire	Gallica
1881	Miracles de Nostre Dame par personnages, vol. 6	Gaston Paris and Ulysse Robert	Gallica
1881	La vie de saint Gilles, par Guillaume de Berneville	Gaston Paris and Alphonse Bos	Gallica
1881	L'amant rendu cordelier à l'observance d'amour, poème attribué à Martial d'Auvergne	Anatole de Montaiglon	Gallica
1882	Raoul de Cambrai	Paul Meyer and Auguste Longnon	Gallica
1882	Oeuvres complètes d'Eustache Deschamps, vol. 3	Auguste-Henry-Édouard, marquis de Queux de Saint-Hilaire	Gallica
1883	Miracles de Nostre Dame par personnages, vol. 7	Gaston Paris and Ulysse Robert	Gallica
1883	Chronique du Mont-Saint-Michel, vol. 2	Siméon Luce	Gallica
1883	Le dit de la panthère d'amours, by Nicole de Margival	Henry Alfred Todd	Gallica
1884	Oeuvres complètes d'Eustache Deschamps, vol. 4	Auguste-Henry-Édouard, marquis de Queux de Saint-Hilaire	Gallica
1884	La mort Aymeri de Narbonne	Joseph Couraye du Parc	Gallica
1884	Les oeuvres poétiques de Philippe de Remi, sire de Beaumanoir, vol. 1	Hermann Suchier	Gallica
1885	Les oeuvres poétiques de Philippe de Remi, sire de Beaumanoir, vol. 2	Hermann Suchier	Gallica
1885	Trois versions rimées de l'Évangile de Nicodème	Gaston Paris and Alphonse Bos	Gallica
1885	Fragments d'une vie de saint Thomas de Cantorbéry	Paul Meyer	Gallica
1886	Oeuvres poétiques de Christine de Pizan, vol. 1	Maurice Roy	Gallica
1886	Merlin, 2 vol.	Gaston Paris and Jakob Ulrich	Google Books 1, Google Books 2
1887	Oeuvres complètes d'Eustache Deschamps, vol. 5	Auguste-Henry-Édouard, marquis de Queux de Saint-Hilaire	Gallica
1887	Aymeri de Narbonne, 2 vol.	Louis Demaison	Google Books 1, Google Books 2
1888	Le mystère de saint Bernard de Menthon	Albert Lecoy de La Marche	Gallica
1888	Les quatre âges de l'homme, morality treatise by Philippe de Navarre	Marcel de Fréville	Gallica
1888	Le couronnement de Louis	Ernest Langlois	Gallica
1889	Les contes moralisés de Nicole Bozon	Lucy Toulmin Smith and Paul Meyer	Gallica
1889	Oeuvres complètes d'Eustache Deschamps, vol. 6	Auguste-Henry-Édouard, marquis de Queux de Saint-Hilaire	Gallica
1889	Rondeaux et autres poésies du XVe siècle	Gaston Raynaud	Gallica
1890	Le roman de Thèbes, vol. 1	Léopold Constans	Gallica
1890	Le roman de Thèbes, vol. 2	Léopold Constans	Gallica
1891	Oeuvres complètes d'Eustache Deschamps, vol. 7	Gaston Raynaud	Gallica
1891	Oeuvres poétiques de Christine de Pizan, vol. 2	Maurice Roy	Gallica
1892	Le chansonnier français de Saint-Germain-des-Prés, vol. 1	Paul Meyer and Gaston Raynaud	Google Books
1893	Miracles de Nostre Dame par personnages, vol. 8	François Bonnardot	Gallica
1893	Oeuvres complètes d'Eustache Deschamps, vol. 8	Gaston Raynaud	Gallica
1893	Le roman de la rose ou de Guillaume de Dole	Gustave Servois	Gallica
1894	L'escoufle	Henri Michelant and Paul Meyer	Google Books
1894	Oeuvres complètes d'Eustache Deschamps, vol. 9	Gaston Raynaud	Gallica
1895	Guillaume de la Barre, adventure novel by Arnaud Vidal de Castelnaudari	Paul Meyer	Google Books
1895	Meliador, by Jean Froissart, vol. 1	Auguste Longnon	Gallica
1895	Meliador, par Jean Froissart, vol. 2	Auguste Longnon	Gallica
1896	Oeuvres poétiques de Christine de Pizan, vol. 3	Maurice Roy	Google Books
1896	La prise de Cordres et de Sebille	Ovide Densusianu	Google Books
1897	Oeuvres poétiques de Guillaume Alexis, prieur de Bucy, vol. 1	Arthur Piaget and Émile Picot	Google Books
1897	L'art de chevalerie, traduction du De re militari by Végèce by Jean de Meun	Ulysse Robert	Gallica 1, Gallica 2
1897	Li abrejance de l'ordre de chevalerie, mise en vers de la traduction de Végèce par Jean de Meun, par Jean Priorat, de Besançon	Ulysse Robert	Gallica
1897	La chirurgie de maître Henri de Mondeville, traduction contemporaine de l'auteur, vol. 1	Alphonse Bos	Gallica
1898	La chirurgie de maître Henri de Mondeville, traduction contemporaine de l'auteur, vol. 2	Alphonse Bos	Gallica
1898	Les Narbonnais, vol. 1	Hermann Suchier	Gallica
1898	Les Narbonnais, vol. 2	Hermann Suchier	Gallica
1899	Orson de Beauvais	Gaston Paris	Gallica
1899	Meliador, by Jean Froissart, vol. 3	Auguste Longnon	Gallica
1899	Oeuvres poétiques de Guillaume Alexis, prieur de Bucy, vol. 2	Arthur Piaget and Émile Picot	Google Books
1900	L'Apocalypse en français au XIIIe siècle (Bibl. nat., fr. 403), vol. 1 (Reproduction phototypique)	Léopold Delisle and Paul Meyer	Gallica
1901	L'Apocalypse en français au XIIIe siècle (Bibl. nat., fr. 403), vol. 2 (Text and introduction)	Léopold Delisle and Paul Meyer	Gallica
1901	Oeuvres complètes d'Eustache Deschamps, vol. 10	Gaston Raynaud	Gallica
1902	Les chansons de Gace Brulé	Gédéon Huet	Gallica
1902	Le roman de Tristan, by Thomas, vol. 1	Joseph Bédier	Internet Archive
1902	Recueil général des sotties, vol. 1	Émile Picot	Gallica
1903	Oeuvres complètes d'Eustache Deschamps, vol. 11	Gaston Raynaud	Gallica
1903	Robert le Diable	Eilert Löseth	Internet Archive
1903	Le roman de Tristan, par Béroul et un anonyme	Ernest Muret	Gallica
1904	Recueil général des sotties, vol. 2	Émile Picot	Gallica
1904	Maistre Pierre Pathelin hystorié	Émile Picot and Édouard Rahir	Gallica
1904	Le roman de Troie, by Benoît de Sainte-Maure, vol. 1	Léopold Constans	Gallica
1905	Le roman de Tristan, by Thomas, vol. 2	Joseph Bédier	Internet Archive
1905	Les vers sur la mort, by Hélinant, moine de Froidmont	Léopold Constans	Gallica
1905	Les cent ballades, by Jean le Senechal	Gaston Raynaud	Gallica
1906	Le roman de Troie, by Benoît de Sainte-Maure, vol. 2	Léopold Constans	Gallica
1906	Les deux rédactions en vers du Moniage Guillaume, vol. 1	Wilhelm Cloetta	Gallica
1907	Le roman de Troie, by Benoît de Sainte-Maure, vol. 3	Léopold Constans	Gallica
1907	Florence de Rome, vol. 1	Axel Wallensköld	Gallica
1907	Les deux poèmes de la Folie Tristan	Joseph Bédier	Gallica
1908	Le roman de Troie, by Benoît de Sainte-Maure, vol. 4	Léopold Constans	Gallica
1908	Oeuvres poétiques de Guillaume Alexis, prieur de Bucy, vol. 3	Arthur Piaget and Émile Picot	Internet Archive
1908	Les oeuvres de Guillaume de Machaut, vol. 1	Ernst Hoepffner	Internet Archive
1909	Le roman de Troie, by Benoît de Sainte-Maure, vol. 5	Léopold Constans	Gallica
1909	Florence de Rome, vol. 2	Axel Wallensköld	Gallica
1909	Les oeuvres de Simund de Freine	John E. Matzke	Gallica
1910	Le jardin de plaisance et fleur de rhétorique, vol. 1	Eugénie Droz and Arthur Piaget	Gallica
1911	Les deux rédactions en vers du Moniage Guillaume, vol. 2	Wilhelm Cloetta	Gallica
1911	Les oeuvres de Guillaume de Machaut, vol. 2	Ernst Hoepffner	Internet Archive
1912	Le roman de Troie, by Benoît de Sainte-Maure, vol. 6	Léopold Constans	Gallica
1912	Recueil général des sotties, vol. 3	Émile Picot	Gallica
1912	Chansons et descorts de Gautier de Dargies	Gédéon Huet	Gallica
1913	L'entrée d'Espagne, vol. 1	Antoine Thomas	Gallica
1913	L'entrée d'Espagne, vol. 2	Antoine Thomas	Gallica
1913	Le lai de l'ombre, by Jean Renart	Joseph Bédier	Internet Archive
1914	Le roman de la rose, by Guillaume de Lorris et Jean de Meun, vol. 1	Ernest Langlois	Gallica
1914	Le roman de Fauvel, by Gervais du Bus, vol. 1	Arthur Långfors	Internet Archive
1919	Le roman de Fauvel, by Gervais du Bus, vol. 2	Arthur Långfors	Internet Archive
1920	Le roman de la rose, by Guillaume de Lorris and Jean de Meun, vol. 2	Ernest Langlois	Gallica
1921	Les oeuvres de Guillaume de Machaut, vol. 3	Ernst Hoepffner	Internet Archive
1921	Le roman de la rose, by Guillaume de Lorris and Jean de Meun, vol. 3	Ernest Langlois	Gallica
1921	Doon de la Roche	Paul Meyer and Gédéon Huet	Gallica
1922	Le roman de la rose, by Guillaume de Lorris and Jean de Meun, vol. 4	Ernest Langlois	Gallica
1922	La fille du comte de Pontieu	Clovis Brunel	Internet Archive
1923	Le roman de Jehan de Paris	Édith Wickersheimer	Internet Archive
1923	Les fortunes et adversités by Jean Régnier	Eugénie Droz	Internet Archive
1924	Le roman de la rose, by Guillaume de Lorris and Jean de Meun, vol. 5	Ernest Langlois	Gallica
1924	Le jardin de plaisance et fleur de rhétorique, vol. 2	Eugénie Droz and Arthur Piaget	Internet Archive
1925	Le chansonnier d'Arras	Alfred Jeanroy	Internet Archive
1925	Les chansons de Thibaut de Champagne	Axel Wallensköld	Gallica
1926	Recueil général des jeux-partis français, vol. 1	Arthur Långfors, Alfred Jeanroy and Louis Brandin	Internet Archive
1926	Recueil général des jeux-partis français, vol. 2	Arthur Långfors, Alfred Jeanroy and Louis Brandin	Internet Archive
1927	La Passion provençale	William Pierce Shepard	Internet Archive
1928	Le roman de la violette ou de Gérard de Nevers, par Gerbert de Montreuil	Douglas Labaree Buffum	Internet Archive
1929	Recueil général des isopets, vol. 1	Julia Bastin	Internet Archive
1930	Recueil général des isopets, vol. 2	Julia Bastin	Internet Archive
1931	Les livres du roy Modus et de la royne Ratio, vol. 1	Gunnar Tilander	.
1931	Les livres du roy Modus et de la royne Ratio, vol. 2	Gunnar Tilander	.
1932	Le roman de Bérinus, vol. 1	Robert Bossuat	.
1932	Le roman de Bérinus, vol. 2	Robert Bossuat	.
1933	La chanson de Roland	Alexandre de Laborde	.
1934	La Passion d'Autun	Grace Frank	.
1935	Les enfances Guillaume	Patrice Henry	.
1935	Poésies du troubadour Aimeric de Belenoi	Maria Dumitrescu	.
1936	Le roman du Castelain de Couci	Maurice Delbouille	.
1936	Les faictz et dictz de Jean Molinet, vol. 1	Noël Dupire	.
1937	Les faictz et dictz de Jean Molinet, vol. 2	Noël Dupire	.
1938	Le roman de Brut de Wace, vol. 1	Ivor Arnold	.
1939	Les faictz et dictz de Jean Molinet, vol. 3	Noël Dupire	.
1940	Le roman de Brut de Wace, vol. 2	Ivor Arnold	.
1941	Jaufré, vol. 1	Clovis Brunel	.
1942	Jaufré, vol. 2	Clovis Brunel	.
1947	La chanson de Guillaume, vol. 1	Duncan McMillan	.
1948	La chanson de Guillaume, vol. 2	Duncan McMillan	.
1949	Les arrêts d'amour by Martial d'Auvergne	Duncan McMillan	.
1953	Girart de Roussillon, vol. 1	W. Mary Hackett	.
1953	Girart de Roussillon, vol. 2	W. Mary Hackett	.
1954	Ille et Galeron, by Gautier d'Arras	Frederick A. G. Cowper	.
1955	Girart de Roussillon, vol. 3	W. Mary Hackett	.
1955	Le livre de la mutacion de Fortune, by Christine de Pizan, vol. 1	Suzanne Solente	.
1956	Le livre de la mutacion de Fortune, by Christine de Pizan, vol. 2	Suzanne Solente	.
1957	Renart le Nouvel, by Jacquemart Giélée	Henri Roussel	.
1958	Le roman de Cassidorus, vol. 1	Joseph Palermo	.
1959	Le roman de Cassidorus, vol. 2	Joseph Palermo	.
1960	Le livre de la mutacion de Fortune, by Christine de Pizan, vol. 3	Suzanne Solente	.
1961	Le livre de la mutacion de Fortune, by Christine de Pizan, vol. 4	Suzanne Solente	.
1969	Le respit de la mort, by Jean le Fevre	Geneviève Hasenohr-Esnos	.
1970	Le roman de Rou by Wace, vol. 1	Anthony J. Holden	.
1971	Le roman de Rou by Wace, vol. 2	Anthony J. Holden	.
1972	Le moniage Rainouart I	Gerald A. Bertin	.
1973	Le roman de Rou by Wace, vol. 3	Anthony J. Holden	.
1977	Girart de Vienne, by Bertrand de Bar-sur-Aube	Wolfgang Van Emden	.
1978	Dits en quatrains d'alexandrins monorimes by Jehan de Saint-Quentin	Birger Munk Olsen	.
1979	Ci nous dit, vol. 1	Gérard Blangez	.
1982	Recueil général des isopets, vol. 3	Pierre Ruelle	.
1984	Le roman de la poire, by Tibaut	Christiane Marchello-Nizia	.
1986	Ci nous dit, vol. 2	Gérard Blangez	.
1987	La vie des Pères, vol. 1	Félix Lecoy	.
1988	Le moniage Rainouart II et III, vol. 1	Gerald A. Bertin	.
1991	La version post-vulgate de la Queste del Saint Graal et de la Mort le roi Artu, troisième partie du Roman du Graal, vol. 1	Fanni Bogdanow	.
1991	La version post-vulgate de la Queste del Saint Graal et de la Mort le roi Artu, troisième partie du Roman du Graal, vol. 2	Fanni Bogdanow	.
1991	La version post-vulgate de la Queste del Saint Graal et de la Mort le roi Artu, troisième partie du Roman du Graal, vol. 3	Fanni Bogdanow	.
1992	La vie des Pères, vol. 2	Félix Lecoy	.
1999	La vie des Pères, vol. 3	Félix Lecoy	.
1999	Recueil général des isopets, vol. 4	Pierre Ruelle	.
2000	La version post-vulgate de la Queste del Saint Graal et de la Mort le roi Artu, troisième partie du Roman du Graal, vol. 4:1	Fanni Bogdanow	.
2001	La version post-vulgate de la Queste del Saint Graal et de la Mort le roi Artu, troisième partie du Roman du Graal, vol. 4:2	Fanni Bogdanow	.
2002	Baudouin de Sebourc, vol. 1	Larry S. Crist	.
2002	Baudouin de Sebourc, vol. 2	Larry S. Crist	.
2004	Le moniage Rainouart II et III, vol. 2	Gerald A. Bertin	.
2005	La vengeance Fromondin	Jean-Charles Herbin	.
2008	La somme le roi by Frère Laurent	Édith Brayer and Anne-Françoise Leurquin-Labie	.
2011	Yonnet de Metz	Jean-Charles Herbin	.
2013	Les Dialogues de Grégoire le Grand translated by Angier	Renato Orengo	.
2015	Le Chansonnier français U published from the Paris manuscript, BNF, fr. 20050. Tome I	Madeleine Tyssens	.
2017	Le miroir historial, volume I, tome I (livres I-IV) by Jean de Vignay	Mattia Cavagna	.
2017	La traduction champenoise de la Vie des Pères	Marie-Geneviève Grossel	.
2018	La Vieille. Traduction du De vetula par Jean Le Fèvre	Marie-Madeleine Huchet	.
2018	Ovide moralisé, livre 1, tomes 1–2	Craig Baker et al.	.
2019	Boèce en rimes par Jean de Thys	John Keith Atkinson	.
2020	Le Chansonnier français U published from the Paris manuscript, BNF, fr. 20050. Tome II	Madeleine Tyssens	
2020	La Chanson de saint Alexis	François Zufferey	
2024	Le miroir historial, volume I, tome I (livres I-IV) by Jean de Vignay	Mattia Cavagna	
2025	La mise en prose de la "Geste des Loherains" dans le manuscrit Arsenal 3346. Nouvelle édition entièrement refondue	Jean-Charles Herbin	
