= Mario Roques =

French scholar

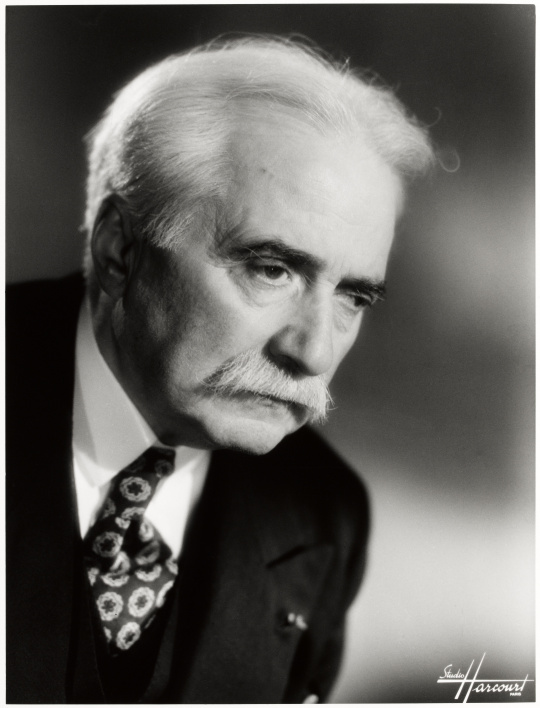
- Born: 1 July 1875; Callao, Peru
- Died: 8 March 1961 (aged 85); Paris, France
- Occupation: Literary historian

Mario Roques (1 July 1875 – 8 March 1961) was a French scholar, professor of history of medieval literature and renowned Romance philologist. He translated and edited Le Roman de Renart.

== Biography ==
Mario Roques was born in Peru where his father was a consular agent He started studying at the École Normale Supérieure (ENS) from 1894 while following courses at the École nationale des chartes as an auditor. In 1895, he joined the École pratique des hautes études (EPHE) where he trained in Romance philology under the guidance of Gaston Paris and Antoine Thomas. His teaching career began early and led him to teach at the ENS, the EPHE (where he would succeed Gaston Paris), the Institut national des langues et civilisations orientales (where he taught the Romanian and Albanian languages and of which he was appointed director, that is to say director, 1936), the Sorbonne and the Collège de France.

In 1910, he created the series "Les classiques français du Moyen âge" at éditions Honoré Champion. The following year, he succeeded Paul Meyer at the head of the journal Romania, which he would manage until his death.

== Bibliography ==
- 1912: The Boy and the Blind Man : jeu du XIIIe, (reissue in 2005 with the addition of a long literary introduction and a file containing extracts of texts thematically related by Jean Dufournet)
- 1931: Le Roman du comte d'Anjou de Jehan Maillart
- 1936: Aucassin and Nicolette
- 1948: Le Roman de Renart
- 1951: Le Roman de Renart
- 1952: Les romans de Chrétien de Troyes : I Érec et Enide
- 1955: Le Roman de Renart
- 1956: Roland à Saragosse, poème méridional du XIVe siècle
- 1957: L'Estoire de Griseldis en rimes et par personages.
- 1958: Le Roman de Renart
- 1958: Le Chevalier à la charrette
- 1959: La Farce du pauvre Jouhan (in collaboration with Eugénie Droz).
- 1960: Le Roman de Renart
- 1960: Yvain, the Knight of the Lion
- 1963: Le Roman de Renart
