= Leo Wiese =

Leo Wiese (26 January 1871, in Bredeney – 20 June 1929, in Münster) was a German Romance philologist and medievalist.

He studied languages at the universities of Bonn and Berlin, then furthered his education in Paris as a pupil of Gaston Paris. In 1899 he received his promotion at the University of Bonn (doctoral advisor Wendelin Förster), and four years later, obtained his habilitation at Münster Academy. In 1910 he succeeded Wilhelm Cloetta as a professor of Romance philology at the University of Jena, and during the following year, returned to Münster as successor to Hugo Andresen.

== Published works ==
He was the author of new editions of Karl Bartsch's Chrestomathie de l'ancien français (VIIIe-XVe siècles) ("Chrestomathy of Old French (8th to 15th centuries) along with a grammar and a glossary"; 9th edition, 1908; 10th edition, 1910; 11th edition, 1913). Other written efforts by Wiese include:

- Die Sprache der Dialoge des Papstes Gregor, 1900 – The language of the Dialogues of Pope Gregory I.
- Die Lieder des Blondel de Nesle. kritische Ausgabe nach allen Handschriften, 1904 – The songs of the Blondel de Nesle; critical edition according to all manuscripts.
- Louis XI et les fortifications de Tulle, d'après un document récemment découvert à Brême (with Antoine Thomas, 1910) - Louis XI and the fortifications of Tulle, according to a document recently discovered in Bremen.
