= Jacquemart =

Jacquemart may refer to:

People:

- Jacquemart Giélée (born c. 1288), French author
- Jacquemart de Hesdin (c. 1355– c. 1414), French painter
- Henri Alfred Jacquemart (1824-1896), French sculptor
- Nélie Jacquemart (fl. late 19th century), painter & collector

Other:

- Jacquemart (bellstriker)
- Jacquemart Island, in New Zealand
- Musée Jacquemart-André, Paris art museum
