= Antoine Le Roux de Lincy =

French academic (1806–1869)

Antoine Le Roux de Lincy (Paris, 22 August 1806 – Paris, 13 May 1869) was a 19th-century French librarian, Romance philologist and medievalist.

After graduating from the École Nationale des Chartes (promotion 1831-1832), Le Roux was appointed at the bibliothèque de l'Arsenal. He also was secretary of the Société des bibliophiles français.

== Publications (selection) ==
- With Francisque Michel: Recueil de farces, moralités et sermons joyeux, 4 Bde., Paris 1831-1838, Genf 1977
- Analyse critique et littéraire du roman de Garin-le-Lohérain, précédée de quelques observations sur l’origine des romans de chevalerie, Paris 1835
- Le Roman de Brut, par Wace, poète du XIIe siècle, publié pour la première fois, 2 Bde., Rouen 1836-1838
- Essai historique et littéraire sur l’Abbaye de Fécamp, Rouen 1840
- Les quatre livres des rois, Paris 1841
- Les cent nouvelles nouvelles, 2 Bde., Paris 1841
- Recueil de chants historiques français depuis le XIIe jusqu’au XVIIIe siècle, 2 Bde., Paris 1841–1842, Genf 1969
- Le Livre des proverbes français, Paris 1842, Paris 1996 (Vorwort von Pierre Boutang); 2. Auflage (« précédé de recherches historiques sur les proverbes français et leur emploi dans la littérature du moyen âge et de la renaissance »), Paris 1859, Genf 1968
- Histoire de l’Hôtel de ville de Paris, Paris 1846
- Les femmes célèbres de l’ancienne France, Paris 1848, 1858
- L’Heptaméron des nouvelles de Marguerite d’Angoulême, 3 Bde., Paris 1853-1854; (with Anatole de Montaiglon), 4 vol., Paris 1880, Genf 1969
- Description de la ville de Paris au XVe siècle, par Guillebert de Metz, Paris 1855
- Chants historiques et populaires du temps de Charles VII et de Louis XI, Paris 1857, 1867
- Vie de la reine Anne de Bretagne, 4 Bde., Paris 1860
- Recherches sur Jean Grolier, sur sa vie et sa bibliothèque, Paris 1866, Nieuwkoop 1970 (englisch: New York 1907)
- With Lazare-Maurice Tisserand: Paris et ses historiens aux XIVe et XVe siècles, Paris 1867 (Auszug, Caen 1992)

== Bibliography ==
- Adolf Birch-Hirschfeld: Leroux de Lincy (Adrian Jean Victor), in: Johann Samuel Ersch, Johann Gottfried Gruber (Hrsg.): Allgemeine Encyclopädie der Wissenschaften und Künste, 2. Sektion, 43. Teil (1889), p. 209.
