= Antoine Thomas (disambiguation) =

Antoine Thomas (1644–1709) was a Belgian Jesuit priest, missionary and astronomer in China.

Antoine Thomas may also refer to:

- Antoine-Léonard Thomas (1732–1785), French poet and literary critic
- Antoine Jean-Baptiste Thomas (1791–1834), French painter and lithographer
- Antoine Thomas (linguist) (1857–1935), French linguist
