= Abel Lefranc =

French literary historian (1863–1952)

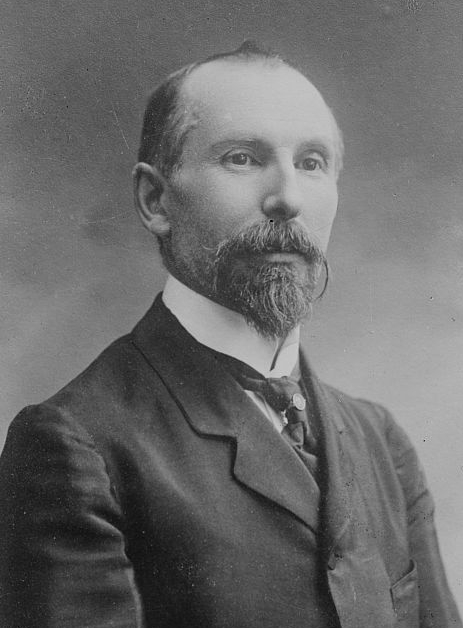
- Born: Abel Jules Maurice Lefranc; 27 July 1863; Élincourt-Sainte-Marguerite, France
- Died: 24 November 1952 (aged 89); Paris, France
- Occupation: Historian

Maurice Jules Abel Lefranc (27 July 1863 – 26 November 1952) was a historian of French literature, expert on Rabelais, and the principal advocate of the Derbyite theory of Shakespeare authorship.

== Early life ==
Lefranc was born in Élincourt-Sainte-Marguerite. After studying at the École Nationale des Chartes, where he wrote a thesis on the history and organization of the town of Noyon until the end of the 13th century (1886). He left to study in Leipzig and Berlin (1887), where he prepared a report on the teaching of history in Germany, which he believed to be the most advanced in the world.

== Scholarly career ==
While working with the National Archives, he continued his historical research, turning specifically to the 16th century. In 1893, at the age of 30, he published Histoire du Collège de France depuis les origines jusqu’à la fin du Premier Empire, a history of the Collège de France from its origin to the fall of Napoleon. His intention was to rehabilitate the later period of the Collège's existence, which had been neglected. He became secretary of the Collège de France under three of its directors: Gaston Boissier, Gaston Paris and Emile Levasseur, combining his job with those of archivist and librarian of the institution. He also continued with his own research on the history of literature.

In 1904, on the death of Émile Deschanel, Chair of Modern French Literature at the Collège de France, Lefranc successfully competed for the position against Ferdinand Brunetière, who was considered anti-scientific and overly influenced by religious doctrines. Lefranc had already been appointed lecturer at the École pratique des hautes études, of which he became director in 1911. By this time, he was considered as an important historian and philologist, whose work on John Calvin, Marguerite de Navarre and François Rabelais was authoritative.

In 1903 Lefranc founded the Société des Etudes rabelaisiennes and the journal Revue des Etudes rabelaisiennes. He believed that Rabelais was a militant anti-Christian atheist, whose nominally comic writings conveyed his philosophy.

Lefranc was elected to the Académie des inscriptions et belles-lettres in 1927.

His works are now largely outdated. They nevertheless helped train a generation of literary historians of the 16th century, who continued his work and applied his methods.

== Shakespeare theories ==
His theories about William Shakespeare were published in 1918 in Sous le masque de William Shakespeare: William Stanley, Vie comte de Derby (2 vol., 1918). Lefranc argued that William Stanley, 6th Earl of Derby was the true author of Shakespeare's works. Lefranc developed the theory after James H. Greenstreet first suggested it in the 1890s, following his discovery of a letter which stated that Derby was "busy in penning comedies for the common players". Lefranc decided that Derby's life fitted the interests and beliefs of Shakespeare the writer. Derby may have had an affair with Mary Fitton, a candidate for the Dark Lady of the sonnets. Lefranc considered Derby to be sympathetic to France and to Catholicism, views he also believed to be present in the plays. Derby's proficiency in French would explain Shakespeare's use of the language in Henry V. According to Lefranc, Derby's experiences in the Court of Navarre are reflected in Love's Labour's Lost. Lefranc also believed that the character of Falstaff was influenced by the work of Rabelais, which was not available in English translation at the time.

== Principal publications ==
- Histoire de la ville de Noyon et de ses institutions jusqu'à la fin du XIIIe siècle (1887)
- La Jeunesse de Calvin (1888)
- Histoire du Collège de France depuis ses origines jusqu'à la fin du premier Empire (1893)
- Les Idées religieuses de Marguerite de Navarre d'après son œuvre poétique Les Marguerites et les Dernières poésies (1898)
- Les Navigations de Pantagruel, études sur la géographie rabelaisienne (1905)
- Les Lettres et les idées depuis la Renaissance (2 vol., 1910–1914)
- Sous le masque de William Shakespeare : William Stanley, Vie comte de Derby (2 vol., 1918)
- La Vie quotidienne au temps de la Renaissance (1938)
- À la découverte de Shakespeare (2 vol., 1945)

=== Editions ===
- Marguerite de Navarre: Les Dernières poésies (1896)
- Jean Calvin: Institution de la religion chrestienne (en coll., 2 vol. 1911)
- François Rabelais: Œuvres (en coll., 5 vol. 1913–1931)
- André Chénier: Œuvres inédites (1914)
