= Ernest Desjardins =

French historian, geographer and archaeologist (1823–1886)

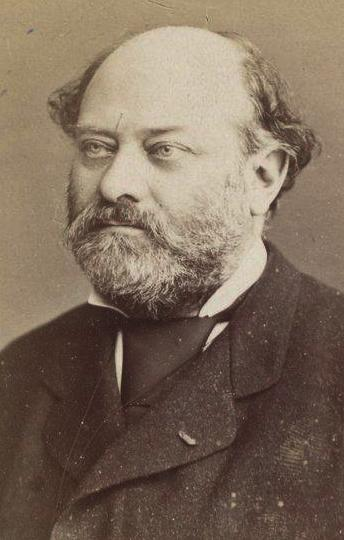
- Ernest Desjardins
- Born: 30 September 1823; Noisy-sur-Oise
- Died: 22 October 1886 (aged 63); Paris
- Occupation: French geographer

Antoine Émile Ernest Desjardins (French pronunciation: [ɑ̃twan emil ɛʁnɛst deʒaʁdɛ̃]; 30 September 1823 – 22 October 1886) was a French historian, geographer and archaeologist. He was a younger brother of historian Abel Desjardins (1814–1886).

In 1856 he began teaching classes in Latin epigraphy at the Lycée Napoleon in Paris, and from 1861 taught courses in geography at the École Normale Supérieure. For several years he conducted archaeological research in Italy, Egypt and regions along the Danube. In 1875, he became a member of the Académie des Inscriptions et Belles-Lettres. In 1886, he was appointed professor of epigraphy and Roman antiquities at the Collège de France.

== Selected works ==
- Atlas géographique de l'Italie ancienne, composé de sept cartes et d'un dictionnaire de tous les noms qui y sont contenus, 1852 – Geographical atlas of ancient Italy.
- Essai sur la topographie du Latium, 1854 – Essay on the topography of Latium.
- Le Pérou avant la conquête espagnole, d'après les principaux historiens originaux, 1858 – Peru before the Spanish conquest, etc.
- Publication des oeuvres complètes de Bartolomeo Borghesi, 1861 – Publication on the complete works of Bartolomeo Borghesi.
- Le grand Corneille, historien, 1862 – On Pierre Corneille.
- Aperçu historique sur les embouchures du Rhône, travaux anciens et modernes, 1866 – Historical overview on the mouth of the Rhône, ancient and modern works.
- Les Juifs de Moldavie, 1867 – The Jews of Moldavia.
- Rapport sur les deux ouvrages de bibliographie américaine de M. Henri Harrisse, 1867 – Report on two American bibliographical works of Henry Harrisse.
- Géographie de la Gaule d'après la Table de Peutinger, 1869 – Geography of Gaul according to the Peutinger Table.
- Rhône et Danube. Nouvelles observations sur les fosses Mariennes et le canal du Bas-Rhône, 1870. – The Rhône and Danube. New observations on the Fosses Mariennes and the Bas-Rhône canal.
- Géographie historique et administrative de la Gaule romaine, (with Auguste Longnon) 1876 – Historical and administrative geography of Roman Gaul.
