= Eugénie Droz =

Swiss romance scholar, editor, publisher and writer

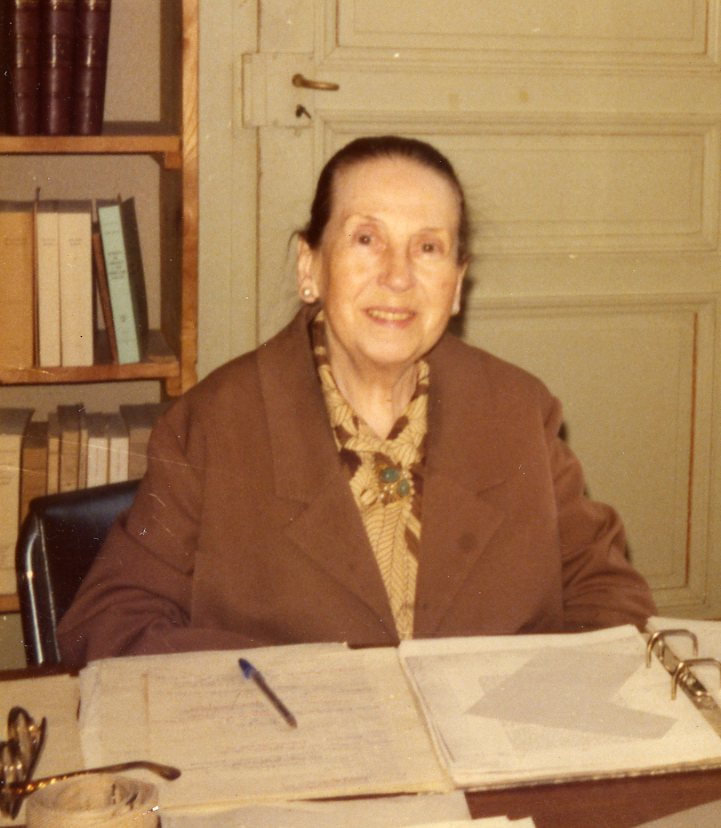
- Born: Laure Eugénie Zahn; 21 March 1893; La Chaux-de-Fonds, Neuchâtel, Switzerland
- Died: 19 September 1976 (aged 83); Geneva, Switzerland
- Education: Université de Neuchâtel; École pratique des hautes études, Paris
- Occupations: editor book seller publisher writer
- Spouse: no
- Parent(s): Frédéric Zahn; Laure Amélie geb. Droz

Eugénie Droz (born Eugénie Zahn; 21 March 1893 – 19 September 1976) was a Swiss romance scholar, editor publisher and writer, originally from the Suisse Romande. She created the Librairie Droz, a publisher and seller of academic books, at Paris in 1924, moving the business to Geneva at the end of the war.

== Biography ==
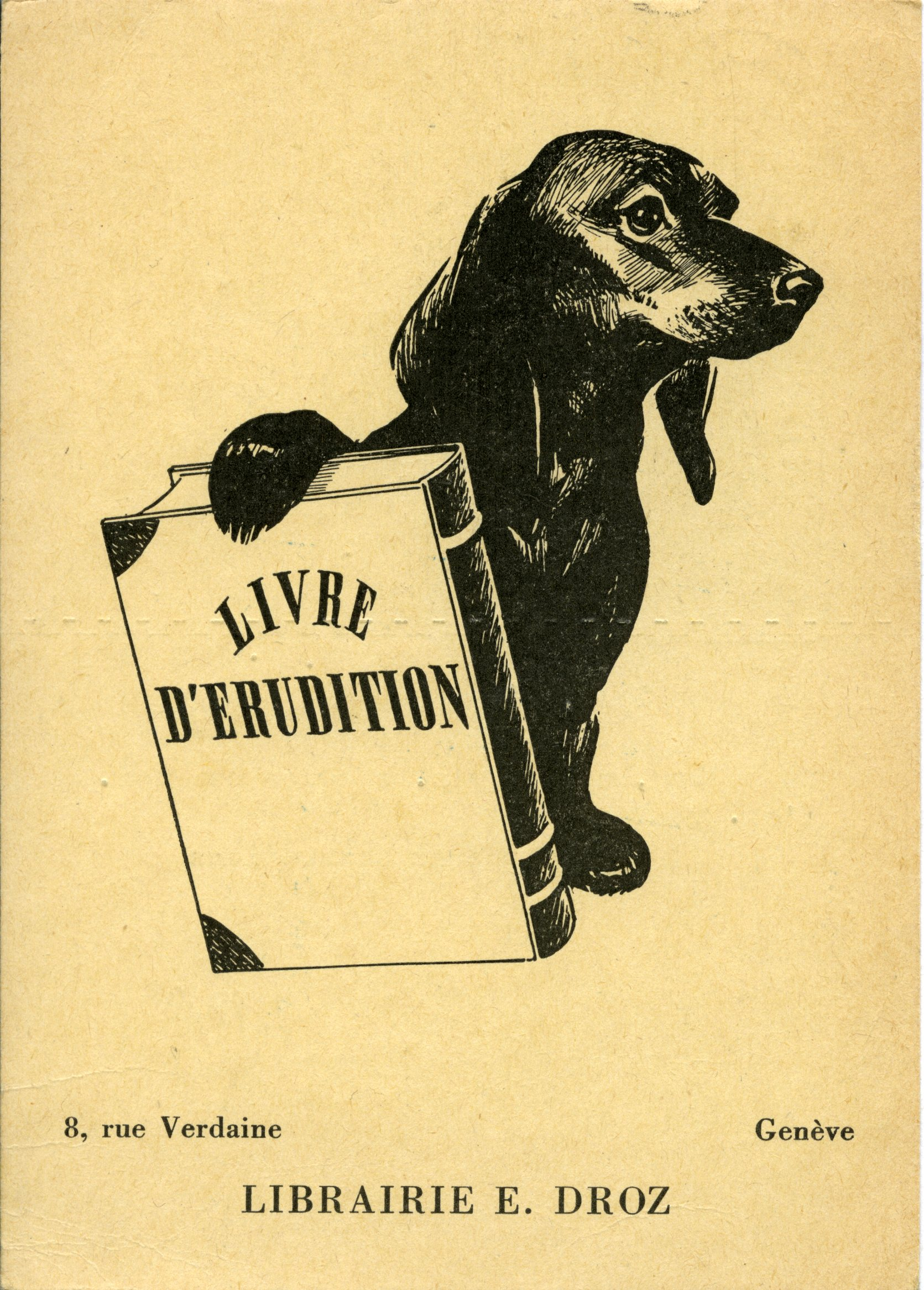
This cartoon of Bigoudi, the dachshund of Eugénie Droz, featured on publicity for her business around 1955.

Laure Eugénie Zahn was born at La Chaux-de-Fonds in the francophone northwest of Switzerland. Her father, Frédéric Zahn, was a well-known member of the business community in the town, where he worked as an editor. In 1900 the family relocated to nearby Neuchâtel. Here she completed her secondary education and obtained a teaching diploma. Between 1910 and 1913 she taught French at the Moravian Institute of Gnadenberg in Silesia, taking the opportunity at the same time to perfect her German. Returning to Neuchâtel in 1913, she was admitted to the Université de Neuchâtel where during the next three years she studied successfully for her degree. She was a pupil of Arthur Piaget, who also became a good friend. He encouraged her to study the history of ancient poetry and renaissance literature. It is apparent that the second volume of Piaget's work "Jardin de Plaisance et Fleur de rhétorique, d'Antoine Vérard (vers 1501)", which was published only in 1925, subtitled "Introduction and notes" and signed off by E.Droz and Arthur Piaget, was largely the work of Piaget's erudite pupil. The compilation of 672 verses, ballads, sounds, rondeaux etc., many of them anonymous, was described in an obituary of Eugénie Droz as an "inestimable contribution to mid-century French literature" ("contribution inestimable aux lettres françaises du milieu du siècle").

In 1916 her parents divorced. Three years later she sought and received permission to use her mother's pre-marriage name in place of her father's name. Eugénie Zahn became Eugénie Droz. Sources covering this period may identify her under either name.

She moved to Paris in 1916 and enrolled, at this stage as Eugénie Zahn, at the École pratique des hautes études (Section IV – Sciences historiques et philologiques (loosely, History and Philology). Her teachers included Alfred Jeanroy, Abel Lefranc and Georges Doutrepont. She received exceptionally positive reports from the outset and completed her degree in 1923. In 1924 she opened the Librairie Droz, initially at 34 rue Serpente, moving within a year to 25 Rue de Tournon, both addresses located appropriately in the 6th arrondissement of Paris. Her business was in essence a specialist bookshop and publisher. The core product would be her own academic output as an editor-publisher with a particular interest in 16th century texts and the history and social impact of books through history more generally. The business continues to focus on medieval and humanist titles and on literary criticism and art history.

She described the Paris premises proudly in her first catalogue: "Accommodated in the House of the Bronze Horse, given by Francis I to [the renaissance poet] Clément Marot in 1539, the 'Librairie Droz' [book business] has been established by Eugénie Droz, graduate of the École pratique des hautes études and docteur ès lettres. Her doctorate came from the Université de Neuchâtel. Her work for it consisted of 35 ancient texts accompanied by translations into contemporary French, a piece of work currently conserved in the rare books collection of the National Library of France.

Despite the Librairie Droz having been established in Paris, the printed device appearing as a form of trade mark on publications acknowledged the Swiss provenance of the proprietor. She copied the design used by Jean de Stalle who operated a printing house in Geneva between 1487 and 1493. The only change involved removing the initials "IdeS", incorporated in the centre of the device, and replacing them with her own initials, "ED".

Shortly after opening the Librairie Droz, still aged only 32, she found time to take on a position as assistant treasurer of the Société des anciens textes français, a learned society founded in Paris in 1875 with the purpose of publishing all kinds of medieval documents written either in langue d'oïl or langue d'oc. (The society's treasurer was Baron Edmond de Rothschild.)

In 1934 she founded "Humanisme et Renaissance", an academic journal which in effect replaced "Revue du seizième siècle". Most prominent among the many erudite collaborators on it were her old tutor, Abel Lefranc and Robert Marichal. She also created the non-profit association "Humanisme et Renaissance". During the occupation she changed the name of the (much diminished) review, which became the "Bibliothèque d'humanisme et Renaissance".

In 1945, while still based in Paris, she created the series "Textes littéraires français". This was an early series of paperback books, with the focus as before on her own areas of academic expertise. In 1950, by which time she had moved to Geneva, she launched the series "les Travaux d'Humanisme et Renaissance" which became and remains an important body of reference for renaissance scholarship.

In November 1944 she found herself mandated by the Provisional Government to study the files of political deportees at Geneva. The later 1940s were a period of acute austerity and political uncertainty in France. It was probably around this time that she decided to relocate permanently from Paris to Geneva. She sold the premises at 25 Rue de Tournon in 1947 and moved the business permanently to 8 rue Verdaine in Geneva. In 1963, the year of her seventieth birthday, she sold the business, which passed to the control of Alain Dufour and Giovanni Busino, two young historians with complementary skills whom she had personally selected.

== Publications (selection) ==
=== As author ===
- Notice sur un manuscrit ignoré de la Bibliothèque nationale : Imprimés, vélin 2231; XVe siècle in Romania, 1918–1919
- La correspondance poétique du rhétoriqueur Jehan Picart, bailli d'Ételan in la Revue du seizième siècle, 1921
- Jean Castel chroniqueur de France in le Bulletin philologique et historique, 1921
- Notice sur un recueil de louanges in Romania, 1923
- Poètes et musiciens du au XVe siècle, 1924 (with G. Thibault)
- Pierre de Nesson et ses œuvres, 1925 (with A. Piaget)
- Un chansonnier de Philippe le Bon in la Revue de Musicologie, 1926 (with G. Thibault)
- Les sept Pseaumes penitenciaulx et Letanie en françoys (with Cl. Dalbanne), 1926
- Relation du souper offert par le duc Sigismond d'Autriche aux commissaires bourguignons, Thann, 21 juin 1469 in Mélanges de philologie et d'histoire offerts à M. Antoine Thomas, 1927
- L'imprimerie à Vienne en Dauphiné au XVe siècle, 1930 (with Cl. Dalbanne)
- Un ex-libris de Simon de Colines in Gutenberg-Jahrbuch, 1931
- Un fragment de la Mort de Garin le Lorrain in Romania, 1931
- Les Reliures à la médaille d'Henri II in Trésors des bibliothèques de France, 1932
- Le chansonnier de Jean de Montchenu in Trésors des bibliothèques de France, 1933
- Prix d'une reliure à la médaille d'Henri II in Humanisme et renaissance, 1935
- Guillaume Boni de Saint-Flour en Auvergne musicien de Ronsard in Mélanges offerts à M. Abel Lefranc, 1936
- Le Manuscrit des Plaintes d'Acante de Tristan L'Hermite, 1937
- Le Comte de Modène et ses correspondants : documents inédits sur l'émigration, 1791–1803, 1942–1943
- Les années d'études de Jean et d'Henry de Sponde in Bibliothèque d'humanisme et renaissance, 1947
- Le Premier séjour d'Agrippa d'Aubigné à Genève, ibid.
- Le carme Jean Bodin, hérétique in Bibliothèque d'humanisme et renaissance, 1948
- Les dernières années de Clément Marot : d'après des poèmes inédits (with P.-P. Plan), ibid.
- L'Inventaire après décès des biens d'Agrippa d'Aubigné in Bibliothèque d'Humanisme et Renaissance, 1949
- Jean de Sponde et Pascal de l'Estocart in Bibliothèque d'Humanisme et Renaissance, 1951
- Les ancêtres suisses de Guillaume Apollinaire in Revue de Suisse, 1952
- Simon Goulart, éditeur de musique in Bibliothèque d'humanisme et Renaissance, 1952
- Claude Baduel, traducteur de Bucer in Bibliothèque d'humanisme et Renaissance, 1955
- Les Étudiants français de Bâle in Bibliothèque d'Humanisme et Renaissance, 1958
- Une impression inconnue de Pierre de Vingle : les Prières et oraisons de la Bible, Lyon : 19 août 1530, ibid.
- Autour de l'affaire Morély : La Roche Chandieu et Barth. Berton suivi de À propos du retour de Henri III de Pologne in Bibliothèque d'humanisme et Renaissance, 1960
- Barthélemy Berton : 1563–1573, 1960
- La veuve Berton et Jean Portau : 1573–1589, 1960
- Note sur les impressions genevoises transportées par Hernández in Bibliothèque d'humanisme et Renaissance, 1960
- L'imprimeur de l'Histoire ecclésiastique, 1580 : Jean de Laon, ibid.
- Fausses adresses in Bibliothèque d'humanisme et Renaissance, 1961
- Complément à la bibliographie de Pierre Haultin, ibid.
- Jacques de Constans, l'ami d'Agrippa d'Aubigné : contribution à l'étude de la poésie protestante, 1962
- Notes sur Théodore de Bèze in Bibliothèque d'Humanisme et Renaissance, 1962
- Stanislas de Clermont-Tonnerre et l'occupation de Genève en 1782 in Annuaire-bulletin de la Société de l'histoire de France, 1962
- La Reine Marguerite de Navarre et la vie littéraire à la cour de Nérac (1579–1582) in Bulletin de la Société des bibliophiles de Guyenne, 1964
- Les Regule de Remigius, Muenster en Westphalie, 1486 in Studi di bibliografia e di storia in onore di Tammaro de Marinis, 1964
- Bibles françaises après le Concile de Trente : 1546 in Journal of the Warburg and Courtauld Institutes, 1965
- Christofle Plantin, imprimeur de Guy de Brès : 1555 Het Boek, 1965
- La première réforme scolaire à Münster en Westphalie in Ideen und Formen : Festschrift für Hugo Friedrich, 1964
- La Société Hamon, Danfrie et Le Royer, 1561 in Gutenberg-Jahrbuch, 1965
- Les débuts de Théodore de Bèze à Genève in Genava, 1965
- Les tapisseries de cuir de Catherine de Médicis in Gazette des beaux-arts, 1965
- Frère Gabriel DuPuyherbault, l'agresseur de François Rabelais in Studi francesi, 1966
- L'Originale des Chrestiennes méditations de Bèze : 1581 in Bulletin de la Société de l'histoire du protestantisme français, 1966, CXII, pp. 236–249.
- Sur quelques traductions françaises d'écrits de David Joris : Rotterdam, Dierck Mullem, vers 1580 in Het Boek, 1966
- Christofle de Thou et Jean Poltrot, seigneur de Méré in Bulletin de la Société de l'histoire du protestantisme français, 1967
- Johann Baptist Fickler, traducteur de DuPuyherbault in Revue d'histoire et de philosophie religieuses, 1967
- Le libraire Jean de Campenon, 1580 in Bulletin de la Société des bibliophiles de Guyenne, 1967
- L'Ecclésiaste de Théodore de Bèze et ses éditions allemandes, 1599 et 1605 in Revue d'histoire et de philosophie religieuses, 1967
- Hendrik van Schor et autres traducteurs de David Joris in Studia bibliographica in honorem Herman de La Fontaine Verwey, 1966
- Encore une édition gothique inconnue de Ronsard : Remonstrance au peuple de France in Refugium animæ bibliotecæ : Festschrift für Albert Kolb, 1969
- Le copiste Guichard Philippe: (1471) in Studi francesi, 1969
- Un recueil de manuscrits du XVe siècle de la bibliothèque de Claude-Enoch Viret in Bulletin de Institut de recherche et d'histoire des textes, 1969
- Les Chemins de l'hérésie : textes et documents, 1970–1976

=== As editor ===
- Alain Chartier, Le quadrilogue invectif, 1923
- Jean Regnier, Les fortunes et adversitez, 1923
- La légende dorée, 1924
- L'abuzé en court, followed by Le doctrinal du temps présent, 1925
- Le jardin de plaisance et fleur de rhétorique (with A. Piaget), 1925
- Remèdes contre la peste (with A.-C. Klebs), 1925
- Ponthus et la Belle Sidoine, 1926
- Les subtiles fables d'Esope (with J. Bastin et Cl. Dalbanne), 1927
- Joan Evans, La civilisation en France au Moyen Âge, 1930
- François Villon, Deux manuscrits : Bibliothèque nationale, fonds français 1661 et 20041 (with A. Jeanroy), 1932
- Le recueil Trepperel (with H. Lewicka), 1935–1961
- Joachim Du Bellay, Les antiquitez de Rome et Les regrets, 1945
- Alain Chartier, Le Quadrilogue invectif , 1950
- La farce du pauvre Jouhan : pièce comique du XVe siècle (with M. Roques), 1959
- Agrippa d'Aubigné, Le printemps : Stances et Odes, 1972

== Honours (selection) ==
- 1951 Docteur honoris causa, University of Geneva
- 1964 Docteur honoris causa, University of Lausanne
- Docteur honoris causa, University of Cologne
- The reading room of the Public and University Library of Geneva, constructed in 1905, carries her name.
