= Wilhelm Cloetta =

German philologist and medievalist (1857–1911)

Wilhelm Cloetta (16 November 1857, in Trieste – 24 September 1911, in Strassburg) was a German Romance philologist and medievalist.

He studied languages at the University of Zürich as a pupil of Heinrich Breitinger and Heinrich Schweizer-Sidler, and from 1877 continued his education in Paris, where his influences included Gaston Paris, Arsène Darmesteter and Paul Meyer. In 1884 he received his doctorate at the University of Göttingen with the dissertation Abfassungszeit und ueberlieferung des Poème Moral. In 1893 he relocated to Jena, where from 1895 to 1909 he taught classes as a full professor of Romance philology. Afterwards, he served as a professor at the University of Strassburg.

== Selected works ==
- Poème moral; altfranzösisches gedicht aus den ersten jahren des xiii. jahrhunderts, 1886 – Poème moral: Old French poem from the first years of the 13th century.
- Beiträge zur Litteraturgeschichte des Mittelalters und der Renaissance (2 volumes, 1890–92) – Contributions to the literary history of the Middle Ages and the Renaissance.
  - Volume 1: Komödie und Tragödie im Mittelalter – Comedy and tragedy in the Middle Ages.
  - Volume 2: Die Anfänge der Renaissancetragödie – The beginnings of the Renaissance tragedy.
- Zu Jean Bodel (Adam de la Halle und Baude Fastoul), 1893 – Jean Bodel (Adam de la Halle and Baude Fastoul).
- Die Enfances Vivien; ihre Ueberlieferung, ihre cyklische Stellung, 1898 – Les Enfances Vivien; its tradition, etc.
- Les deux rédaction en vers du Moniage Guillaume, chansons de geste du XIIe siècle (2 volumes, 1906–11) – Two compositions in verse of Moniage Guillaume, chansons de geste of the 12th century.
