= Émile Picot =

French Romance philologist (1844–1918)

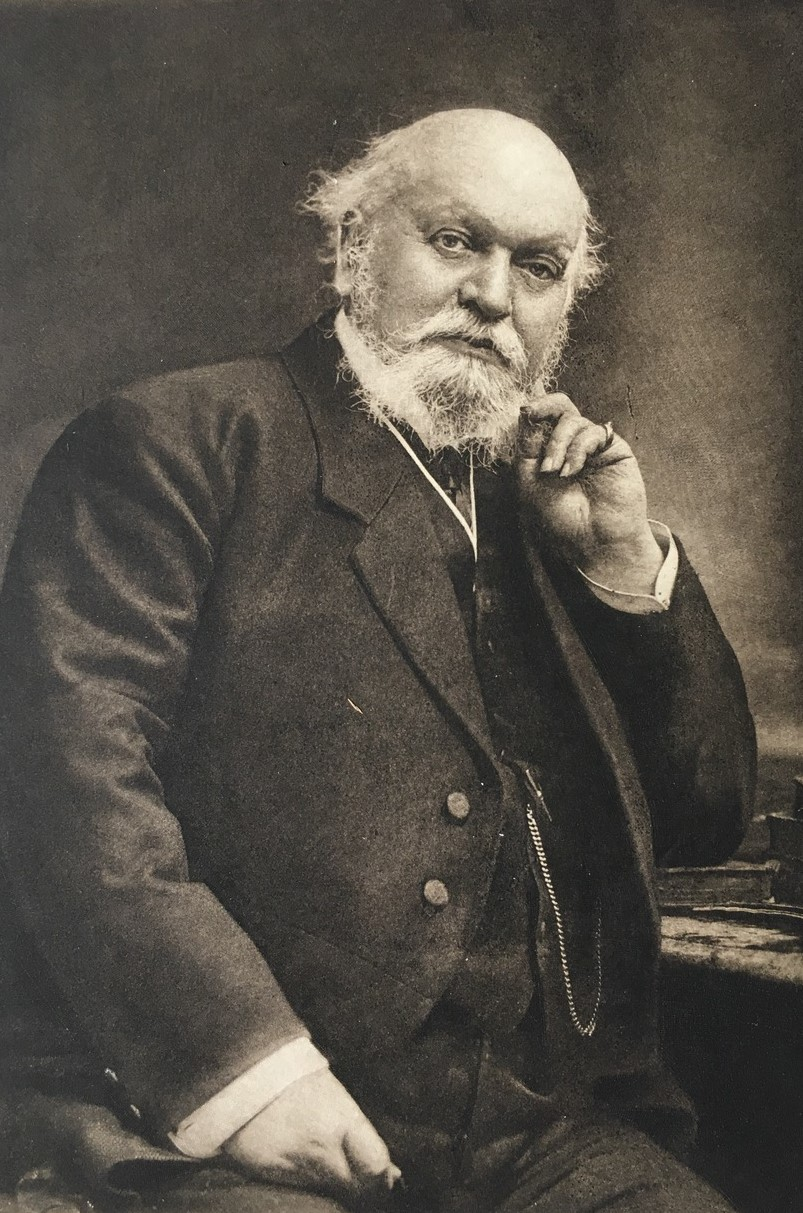

Émile Picot (13 September 1844, in Paris – 24 September 1918, in Saint-Martin-d'Écublei) was a French Romance philologist.

In 1865 he obtained his law degree, and afterwards served as a lawyer at the Court of Appeals in Paris. He later worked as a French vice-consular agent in Hermannstadt (from 1868) and Témesvar (from 1869). From 1875 to 1909 he taught classes in Romanian philology at the École spéciale des Langues orientales in Paris. In 1888 he received the title of professor.

From 1897 to 1918 he was a free member of the Académie des Inscriptions et Belles-Lettres, and from 1914 to 1918 he served as director of the Société des antiquaires de Normandie. He was also an editor of the journal, Revue de linguistique et de philologie comparée.

== Selected works ==
- Les Serbes de Hongrie, leur histoire, etc., 1873 – The Serbs of Hungary, their history, etc.
- Les Roumains de la Macédoine, 1875 – The Romanians of Macedonia.
- Bibliographie Cornélienne; ou, Description raisonnée de toutes les éditions des oeuvres de Pierre Corneille, 1875 – Bibliography of Pierre Corneille; description of all editions of his works.
- Pierre Gringore et les comédiens italiens, 1878 – Pierre Gringore and the Italian actors.
- Chronique de Moldavie depuis le milieu du XIVe siècle jusqu'a l'an 1594, 1878 – Chronicle of Moldavia from the middle of the 14th century to the year 1594.
- Collection de documents pour servir à l'histoire de l'ancien théâtre, 1879 – Collection of documents to be used for the history of the former French theater.
- Théâtre mystique de Pierre du Val et des libertins spirituels de Rouen, au 16e sìecle, 1882 – Mystic theatre of Pierre du Val and spiritual libertines of Rouen in the 16th century.
- Catalogue de livres composant la bibliothéque de feu M. le baron James de Rothschild, 1884 – Catalogue of books in the library of Baron James de Rothschild.
- Chants populaires des roumains de Serbie, 1889 – Popular folksongs of Romanians in Serbia.
- Œuvres poétiques de Guillaume Alexis; with Arthur Piaget (3 volumes, 1896–1908) – Poetic works of Guillaume Alexis.
- Les Italiens in France au XVIe siècle, 1901 – Italians in France in the 16th century.
- Les imprimeurs rouennais en Italie au xve siècle, 1911 – Rouen printers in Italy in the 15th century.
- Pour et contre l'influence italienne en France au XVIe siècle, 1920 – Pros and cons regarding Italian influence in France in the 16th century.
