= Jean Priorat =

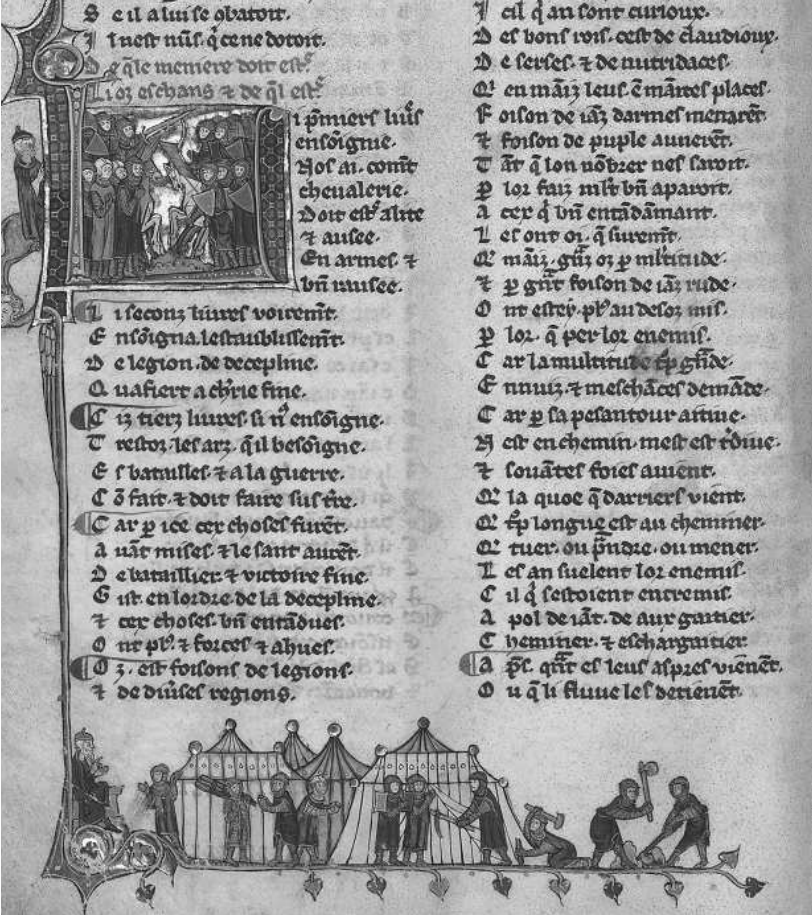
A page from Priorat's Li abrejance

Jean Priorat was a 13th-century soldier and poet from imperial city of Besançon who put into Old French verse Jean de Meun's prose translation of Vegetius' military manual De re militari. He completed the poem, entitled Li abrejance de l'ordre de chevalerie, between 1284 and 1291, dedicating it to John I of Chalon-Arlay. Although he had firsthand experience of war, he did not expand substantially on Vegetius' ideas.

== Life ==
Jean was a native of the imperial city of Besançon. His father was Étienne Priorat, a rich bourgeois who owned a large house in Besançon. He had a sister named Isabelle and was probably educated at the University of Paris. His father was dead by 26 April 1284, when he sold the house while his sister retained a dwelling in it. In the spring of 1285, he joined the small army raised by Count Otto IV of Burgundy to assist French invasion of Aragon, since Otto was seeking the hand of a French princess in marriage. He embarked with the army at Dole, but the campaign was a disaster. He lost his rouncey (horse) and requested compensation from the insolvent count, who eventually gave him nine barrels of wine in April or May 1286.

Perhaps as a result of this disappointment, he sought the patronage of the lord of Arlay, who probably commissioned Li abrejance. Whereas Otto IV favoured close ties with France, with which the county of Burgundy shared language and culture, John was politically oriented towards the Holy Roman Empire, of which it was a fief.

== Works ==
Li abrejance was written between 1284 and 1291, probably between 1286 and 1290. It contains 11,500 octosyllabic lines. The language has features of the local dialect, Frainc-Comtou. The title comes from the first stanza, while the explicit calls the work Li romanz de chevalerie. In three places Priorat names himself, once giving also first name and in the other two instances his birthplace. He combined Vegetius fourth and fifth chapters into one, leading to a misconception among some scholars that he did not translate the fifth chapter on naval warfare. Historian Christopher Allmand suggests that some verses were inspired by the French lack of preparedness for the battle of Les Formigues.

Li abrejance is not a new translation of Vegetius from Latin but a relatively faithful rendering of Jean de Meun's existing French prose translation. Although Priorat had firsthand experience of war, he did not expand substantially on Vegetius' ideas. Compared to vernacular translations of Vegetius in general, Li abrejance had little influence. Its Frainc-Comtou features may have contributed to its limited diffusion. It is preserved in a single illuminated codex now number 1604 in Fonds Français of the Bibliothèque nationale de France in Paris. It is a fine copy running to 76 leaves with text in two columns with miniatures at the start of each chapter and in the margins. The illustrations are topical, corresponding to the adjacent text and accurately representing warfare as it was in the late 13th century. The manuscript is in good condition, showing little signs of use. A printed edition of the text appeared in 1897.

== Bibliography ==
- Allmand, Christopher (2011). The De Re Militari of Vegetius: The Reception, Transmission and Legacy of a Roman Text in the Middle Ages. Cambridge University Press.
- Bliese, John R. E. (1994). "Rhetoric Goes to War: The Doctrine of Ancient and Medieval Military Manuals". Rhetoric Society Quarterly. 24 (3): 105–130. doi:10.1080/02773949409391022.
- Castan, Auguste (1875). "Jean Priorat, de Besançon, poète français de la fin du XIII^{e} siècle". Bibliothèque de l'École des Chartes. 36: 124–138. doi:10.3406/bec.1875.446627.
- Robert, Ulysse (1874). "Jean Priorat, de Besançon, traducteur de Végèce". Bibliothèque de l'École des Chartes. 35: 204–207. doi:10.3406/bec.1874.462124.
- Robert, Ulysse, ed. (1897). Li abrejance de l'ordre de chevalerie mise en verse de la traduction de Végèce de Jean de Meun par Jean Priorat, de Besançon. Société des anciens textes français. Vol. 40. Firmin Didot.
- Thorpe, Lewis (1952). "Mastre Richard, a Thirteenth-Century Translator of the 'De re militari' of Vegetius". Scriptorium. 6 (1): 39–50.
