= Clovis Brunel =

French philologist and writer

- Born: Clovis Félix Brunel; 19 February 1884; Amiens, France
- Died: 5 December 1971 (aged 87); Paris, France
- Occupations: Philologist, writer

Academic work
- Notable students: Georges Bataille

Signature
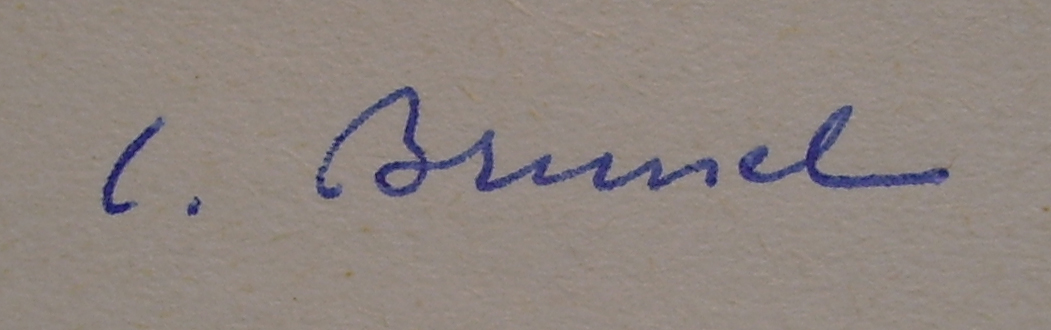

Clovis Félix Brunel (1884–1971) was a French philologist and writer.

== Selected works ==
- Les miracles de saint Privat. Suivis des Opuscules d'Aldebert III, évêque de Mende, Paris, A. Picard, 1912
- éd. de Bertran de Marseille, La vie de sainte Énimie. Poème provençal du XIIIe, Paris, H. Champion, 1916
- éd. de La Fille du comte de Ponthieu, nouvelle du XIIIe, Paris, H. Champion, 1926
- éd. de Les plus anciennes chartes en langue provençale. Recueil des pièces originales antérieures au XIIIe., Paris, Picard, 1926-1952
- éd. de Recueil des actes des comtes de Pontieu (1026-1279), Paris, Imprimerie nationale, 1930
- Bibliographie des manuscrits littéraires en ancien provençal, Liège, G. Thone; Paris : E. Droz, 1935
- éd. de Jaufré. Roman arthurien du XIIIe en vers provençaux, Paris, Société des anciens textes français, 1943
- " Vida e miracles de Sancta Flor ", Analecta Bollandiana, 64, 1946, p. 5-49.
- Dir. de l'éd. de Recueil des actes de Philippe-Auguste, roi de France, Paris, Imprimerie nationale, 1916-...
- éd. de Recettes médicales, alchimiques et astrologiques du XVe en langue vulgaire des Pyrénées, Toulouse, E. Privat, 1956

Preceded by Maurice Prou	Director of the École Nationale des Chartes; 1930-1954	Succeeded by Pierre Marot
