= René de Lespinasse =

French historian and politician

René de Lespinasse (13 October 1843 – 16 February 1922) was a French historian and politician.

He was a member of the Société de l'histoire de Paris et de l'Île-de-France (from 1874) and served as president of the Société nivernaise des lettres, sciences et arts.

== Selected works ==
- Sacramentarium ad usum Æcclesiæ nivernensis (1873).
- Vie et vertus de Saint Louis d'après Guillaume de Nangis et le confesseur de la reine Marguerite (1877).
- Les métiers et corporations de la Ville de Paris (4 volumes, 1879–97).
- XIIIe siècle: le livre des métiers d'Étienne Boileau (with François Bonnardot, 1879).
- Une famille noble sous la Terreur (1879).
- Le Nivernais et les comtes de Nevers (3 volumes, 1909–14).
- Cartulaire de Saint-Cyr de Nevers (1916).
