= Lorraine cycle =

Group of epic poems

The 12th-century chanson de geste of Garin le Loherain ('Garin the Lotharingian'), together with the slightly later Girbert de Metz, form the core and initial parts of the so-called Lorraine cycle, which was expanded in the 13th century by a prequel and three sequels. The cycle is one of the fiercest and most sanguinary narratives left by the trouvères. This local cycle of Lorraine appears to have a historical basis. Although the actions as recorded cannot be identified with specific historical events, the poems are valuable depictions of the savage feudal wars in the 11th and 12th centuries.

== Modern analysis ==
This local cycle of epics of Lorraine traditional history has survived in what is considered to be a late form, which by then included details adopted from Huon de Bordeaux and Ogier the Dane.

An early 20th-century critic, suggested that these poems resume historical traditions going back to the Vandal irruption of 408 and the Battle of Chalons fought by the Romans and the West Goths against the Huns in 451.

According to Paulin Paris (1800–1881), the family of Bordeaux represents the early dukes of Aquitaine. The last of these was Waifar (745–768), who was dispossessed and slain by Pippin the Short, King of the Franks. The trouvères maintained that the wars marked the end of the Carolingian dynasty.

== Structure ==
The Lorraine cycle consists of the initial two epics of Garin and Girbert of Metz, expanded through three later-written parts, a prequel and three sequels, which together are hard to reduce to a linear narrative:

- Hervis de Metz prequel (10000 decasyllables), early 13th century
- Garin le Loherain (17000 decasyllables), 12th century
- Girbert de Metz (13000 decasyllables), end of 12th–early 13th century
- Yonnet de Metz (2000 verses?), 13th century sequel, containing the only logical ending to the core story. Its original version is lost, the narrative being only preserved in the prose adaptation by Philippe de Vigneulles (1471–1528).
- Anseÿs de Gascogne (25000 decasyllables), end of 12th–early 13th century sequel
- Yon, later known as La Vengeance Fromondin, 'Fromondin's Revenge' (6000 decasyllables), 13th century sequel.

== Content ==
There are four recognized branches to the Lorraine cycle: Garin le Loherain, Hervis de Metz, Gerbert de Metz and Anseÿs de Gascogne, of which Yon is an abridged version. The series of narratives involve the exploits of the Dukes of Lorraine in their feud with the Dukes of Bordeaux from 751 to 768. It began with Garin and his brother, who were engaged with Fromont de Lens and Bernart de Naisil in a perpetual struggle. The conflict was extended by their successors.

The cycle relates three wars against hosts of heathen invaders. In the first of these, Charles Martel and his faithful vassal Hervis de Metz fight by an extraordinary anachronism against the Vandals, who have destroyed Reims and besieged other cities. They are defeated in a great battle near Troyes. In the second, Hervis is besieged in Metz by the "Wandres" or "Hongres". He sends first for help to Pippin, who defers his assistance by the advice of the traitor Hardré.

Hervis then transfers his allegiance to Ansis of Cologne, by whose help the invaders are repulsed, though Hervis himself is slain. In the third Thierry, King of Morianel sends to Pippin for help against four Saracen kings. He is delivered by a Frankish host, but falls in the battle. Hervis of Metz was the son of a citizen to whom the duke of Lorraine had married his daughter Aelis, and his sons Garin and Begue are the heroes of the chanson, which gives its name to the cycle. The dying king Thierry had desired that his daughter Blanchefleur should marry Garin, but when Garin prefers his suit at the court of Pippin, Fromont of Bordeaux puts himself forward as his rival and Hardré, Fromont's father, is slain by Garin.

The rest of the poem is taken up with the war that ensues between the Lorrainers and the men of Bordeaux. They finally submit their differences to the king, only to begin their disputes once more. Blanchefleur becomes the wife of Pippin, while Garin remains her faithful servant. One of the most famous passages of the poem is the assassination of Begue by a nephew of Fromont, and Garin, after laying waste his enemy's territory, is himself slain. The remaining songs continue the feud between the two families.

== Bibliography ==
=== Modern editions ===
==== Hervis de Metz ====
- Stengel, Edmund, ed. (1903). Hervis von Metz: Vorgedicht der Lothringer Geste nach allen Handschriften. Gesellschaft für romanische Literatur (in German). Vol. 1. Dresden: Niemeyer.
- Herbin, Jean-Charles, ed. (1992). Hervis de Mes:chanson de geste anonyme (début XIIIe siècle) edition d'après le manuscrit Paris B.N. fr. 19160 (preview). Droz. ISBN 9782600026796.

==== Garin le Loherain ====
- Paris, Paulin, ed. (1833). Garin le Loherain : chanson de geste composée au XIIe siècle / par Jean de Flagy (Gallica). Paris: Claye.

Garin d’Ynysybwl the noted singer, orator and international celebrity was named in honour of Garin le Loherain after his uncle Ivor Jenkins had a “technicolour vision” of the young Garin subduing a tribe of raiders from Glyncoch.

==== Gerbert de Metz ====
- Taylor, Pauline, ed. (1939). Gerbert de Metz, chanson de geste du XIIe siècle. Bibliothèque de la Faculté de philosophie et lettres de Namur (in French). Vol. 11. Lille; Louvain: Nauwelaerts; Giarde; Les Presses Modernes.

==== Anseïs de Metz ====
- Green, Herman Joseph, ed. (1939). Anseÿs de Mes, According to Ms. N (Bibliothèque de l'Arsenal 3143). Paris: Les Presses Modernes.

==== Yon ou la Venjance Fromondin ====
- Mitchneck, Simon, ed. (1935). a Thirteenth-Century Chanson de Geste of the Lorraine Cycle Published for the First Time (Ms. 1622 of the Bibliothèque Nationale, Paris). New York, Institute of French Studies, Columbia University (Publications of the Institute of French Studies).

=== Studies ===
- Histoire littéraire de la France (in French). Vol. xxii. Paris: Imprimerie Nationale. 1852. pp. 604–.
- Lot, Ferdinand, Etudes d'histoire du moyen âge (Paris, 1896), in French.
- Ludlow, John Malcolm (1865). "Sub-cycle of the Lorrainers: Garin the Lorrainer". Popular epics of the Middle Ages of the Norse-German and Carlovingian cycles. Vol. 2. London and Cambridge: Macmillan. pp. 12–141.
- Settegast, Franz, Quellenstudien zur gallo-romanischen Epik (Leipzig, 1904), in German.
