= Ernst Hoepffner =

French scholar of medieval literature (1879–1956)

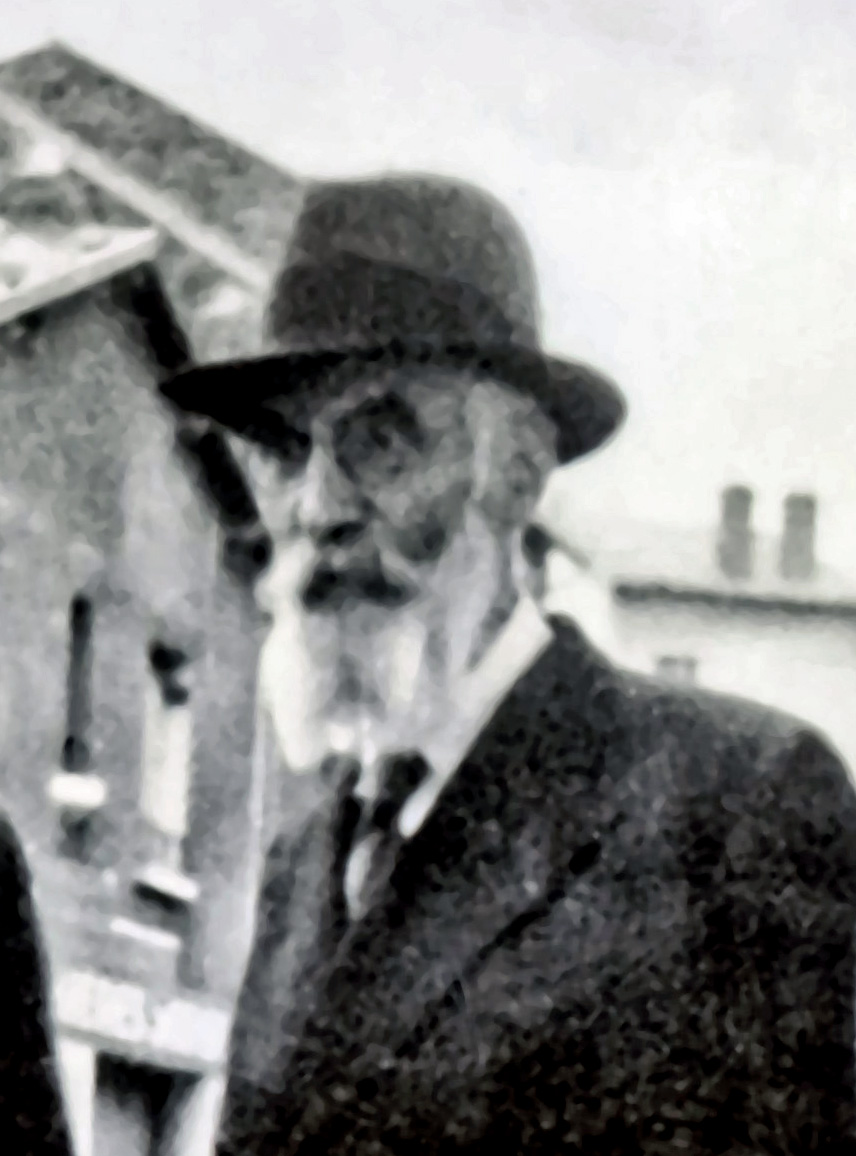
Ernst Hoepffner

Ernst Hoepffner (14 November 1879 – 1956) was a French scholar of medieval literature.

== Biography ==
Hoepffner was born in Rountzenheim, Bas-Rhin. He hailed from a family of Protestant pastors, and studied in Strasbourg, Florence, and Paris. He received his doctorate in 1903, with a dissertation on Eustache Deschamps, written under Gustav Gröber; Eustache Deschamps: Leben und Werke was published in Strasbourg (1904) and reprinted in Geneva (1974). His habilitation followed in 1906, on Guillaume de Machaut. From 1911, he tutored Old French and Old Provencal in Strasbourg. In 1911 he took over Leo Wiese's chair at the University of Jena, where he taught until 1918. From 1919 to 1948 he held the chair for Romance philology at the University of Strasbourg, and was part of the exodus to Clermont-Ferrand in 1943; the razzia there of November 1943 landed him in the Gestapo jail for a few nights. In 1939, he became a non-resident member of the Académie des Inscriptions et Belles-Lettres. Paul Imbs was one of his students. He died 16 October 1956.

Among his publications are a three-volume edition (1908-1921) of the works of Guillaume de Machaut. From 1912 to 1919 he edited the Zeitschrift für romanische Philologie, and he edited the journal Romania.
