= Louis Ferdinand Alfred Maury =

French scholar and physician (1817–1892)

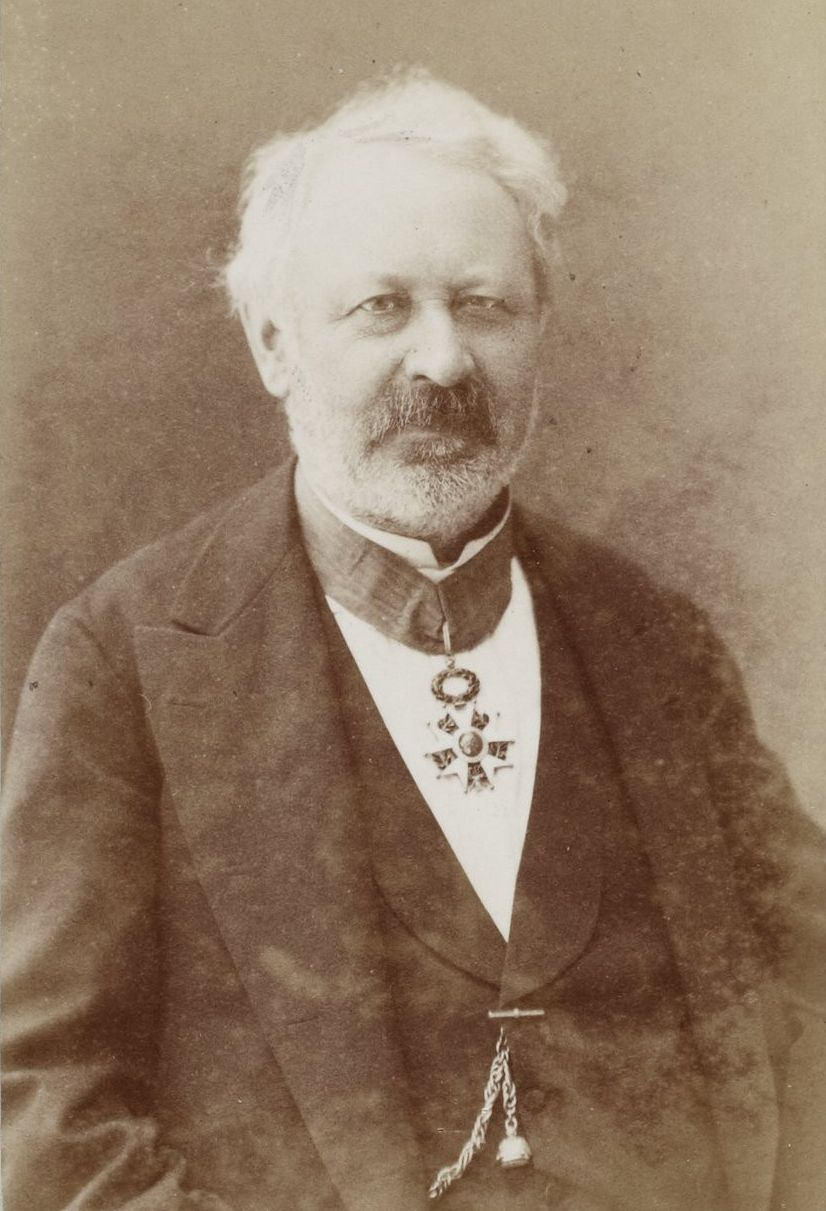
Alfred Maury

Louis Ferdinand Alfred Maury (March 23, 1817 – February 11, 1892) was a French scholar and physician, important because his ideas about the interpretation of dreams and the effect of external stimuli on dreams pre-dated those of Sigmund Freud. He is mentioned by Freud in The Interpretation of Dreams, and by Sebastian Faulks in Human Traces. He coined the term hypnagogic hallucination and reported a dream that famously inspired Salvador Dalí's painting Dream Caused by the Flight of a Bee Around a Pomegranate a Second Before Awakening. Alfred Maury was contemporary with Hervey de Saint Denys and the two dream researchers were in disagreement with each other (Blanken & Meijer, 1988).

He was born at Meaux. In 1836, having completed his education, he entered the Bibliothèque Nationale, and afterwards the Bibliothèque de l'Institut (1844), where he devoted himself to the study of archaeology, ancient and modern languages, medicine and law.

Gifted with a great capacity for work, a remarkable memory and an unbiased and critical mind, he produced a number of learned pamphlets and also books on the varied subjects. He rendered great service to the Académie des Inscriptions et Belles-Lettres, of which he had been elected a member in 1857. Napoleon III employed him in research work connected with the Histoire de César, and he was rewarded, proportionately to his active, if modest, part in this work, with the positions of librarian of the Tuileries (1860), professor at the Collège de France (1862) and director-general of the Imperial Archives (1868). It was not, however, to the imperial favor that he owed these high positions. He used his influence for the advancement of science and higher education, and with Victor Duruy was one of the founders of the École des Hautes Etudes. He died in Paris four years after his retirement from the last post.

== Bibliography ==
His works are numerous: Les Fées au Moyen âge and Histoire des légendes pieuses au Moyen âge; two books filled with ingenious ideas, which were published in 1843, and reprinted after the death of the author, with numerous additions under the title Croyances et légendes du Moyen âge (1896); Histoire des grands forts de la Gaule et de l'ancienne France (1850, a 3rd ed. revised, appeared in 1867 under the title Les Forts de la Gaule et de l'ancienne France); La Terre et l'homme, a general historical sketch of geology, geography and ethnology, being the introduction to the Histoire universelle, by Victor Duruy (1854); Histoire des religions de la Grèce antique, (3 vols., 1857–1859); La Magie et l'astrologie dans l'antiquité et dans le Moyen âge (1863); Histoire de l'ancienne Académie des sciences (1864); Histoire de l'Académie des Inscriptions et Belles Lettres (1865); a learned paper on the reports of French archaeology, written on the occasion of the Exposition Universelle (1867); a number of articles in the Encyclopédie moderne (1846–1851), in Michaud's Géographie universelle (1858 and seq.), in the Journal des savants in the Revue des deux mondes (1873, 1877, 1879–1880, &c). A detailed bibliography of his works has been placed by Auguste Longnon at the beginning of the volume Les Croyances et légendes du Moyen âge.
