= Élincourt-Sainte-Marguerite =

- Commune
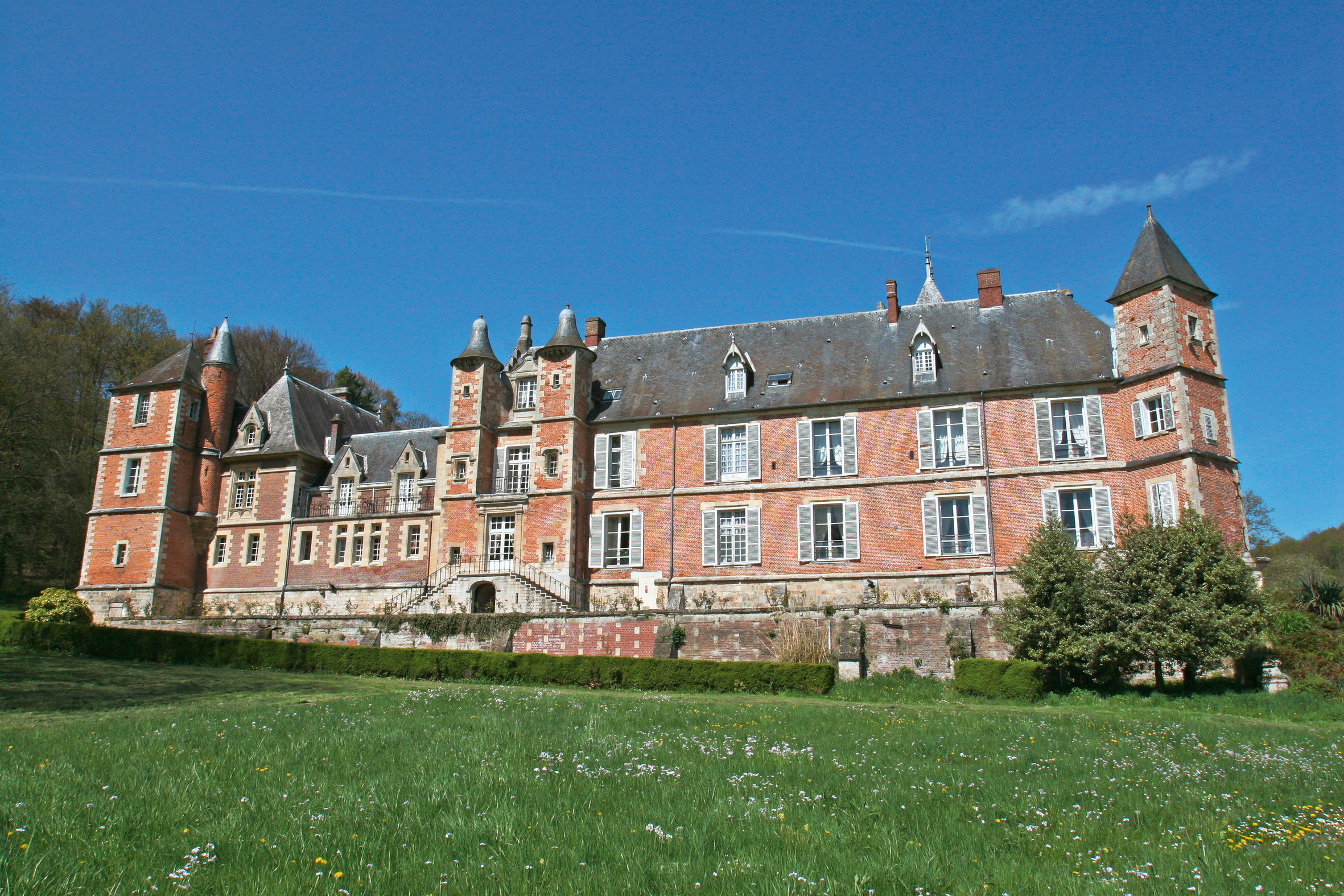
- Bellinglise Castle

- Coat of arms
- Location of Élincourt-Sainte-Marguerite
- Location within France Location within Hauts-de-France
- Coordinates: 49°31′35″N 2°49′08″E
- Country: France
- Region: Hauts-de-France
- Department: Oise
- Arrondissement: Compiègne
- Canton: Thourotte
- Intercommunality: Pays des Sources

Government
  - Mayor (2020–2026): Annie Menard
- Area^{1}: 10.98 km^{2} (4.24 sq mi)
- Elevation: 80 m (260 ft)
- Highest elevation: 182 m (597 ft)
- Lowest elevation: 37 m (121 ft)
- Population (2023): 922
  - Density: 84.0/km^{2} (217/sq mi)
- Time zone: UTC+01:00 (CET)
  - Summer (DST): UTC+02:00 (CEST)
- INSEE/Postal code: 60206 /60157
- ^{1} French Land Register data, which excludes lakes, ponds, glaciers > 1 km^{2} (0.386 sq mi or 247 acres) and river estuaries.

Élincourt-Sainte-Marguerite (French pronunciation: [elɛ̃kuʁ sɛ̃t maʁɡərit]) is a commune in the Oise department in northern France.

Élincourt-Sainte-Marguerite is situated between Paris and Lille in the region of Hauts-de-France, 100 km from Paris, 80 km from Amiens, and 145 km from Lille.

== Population ==
The residents of the commune are called Élincourtois.

== Personalities ==
Élincourt-Sainte-Marguerite was the birthplace of:

- Abel Lefranc (1863-1952), historian of French literature, expert on Rabelais.

== See also ==
- Communes of the Oise department
