= Émile Egger =

19th-century French classical scholar

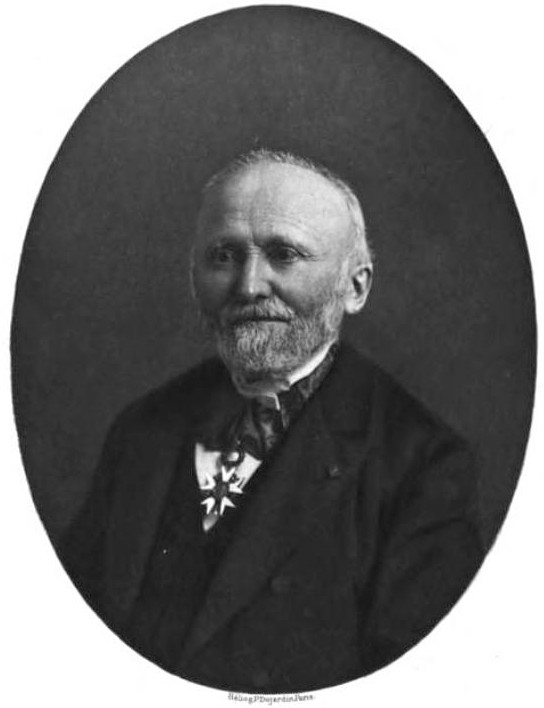
Émile Egger

Émile Egger (18 July 1813 – 1 September 1885) was a French scholar.

== Life ==
Émile Egger was born in Paris.

From 1840 to 1855, Egger was assistant professor, and from 1855 until his death he was professor of Greek literature in the Faculté des Lettres at Paris University. In 1854 Egger was elected a member of the Académie des Inscriptions and in 1873 of the Conseil supérieur de l'instruction publique.

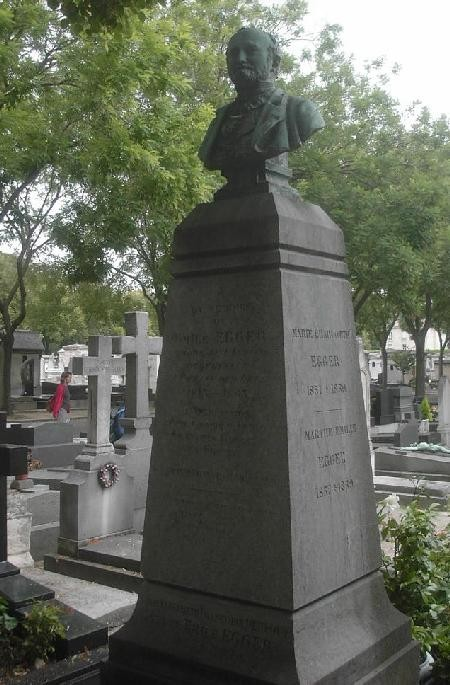
Egger's grave site in Paris, bronze bust by Louis-Edmond Cougny.

Egger was a voluminous writer, a sound and discerning scholar, and his influence was largely responsible for the revival of the study of classical philology in France. His most important works are as follows:

- Essai sur l'histoire de la critique chez les Grecs (1849)
- Notions élémentaires de grammaire compare (1852)
- Apollonius Dyscole, essai sur l'histoire des théories grammaticales dans l'Antiquité (1854)
- Mémoires de littérature ancienne (1862)
- Mémoires d'histoire ancienne et de philologie (1863)
- Les Papyrus grecs du Musée du Louvre et de la Bibliothèque Impériale (1865)
- Études sur les traits publics chez les Grecs et les Romains (1866)
- L'Hellénisme en France (1869)
- La Littérature grecque (1890).

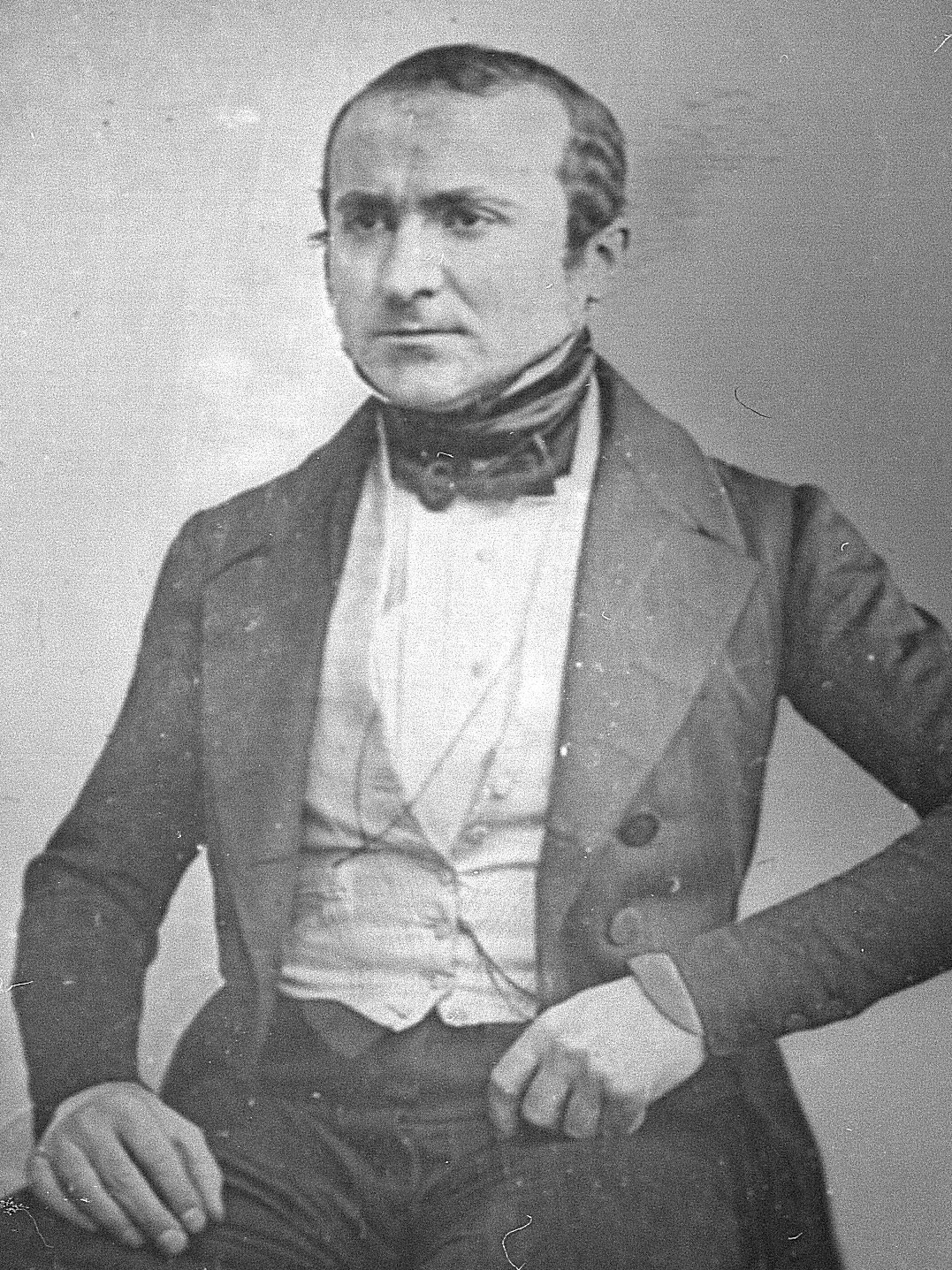
Auguste-Émile Egger in 1844 at age 31

He was also the author of Observations et réflexions sur le développement de l'intelligence et du langage chez les enfants (1879).

Egger died in 1885, and was buried at the Cimetière Montparnasse in Paris (facing the western wall, on the far right on entering from the north).
