= Ernest de Bouteiller =

French historian and politician

Ernest de Bouteiller (10 February 1826, Paris – 26 May 1883) was a French historian and politician.

He studied at the École Polytechnique, and for several years served in the French military, receiving the rank of artillery captain in 1857. He later served as deputy mayor of Metz, and from 1864 to 1870 was president of the arrondissement council of Metz. In 1869–70, he held the post of député. In 1872, he was chosen as a chevalier in the Légion d'Honneur.

He served as president of the Société d'archéologie et d'histoire de la Moselle, and from 1874 to 1883 was a member of the Société de l'histoire de Paris et de l'Île-de-France.

== Selected works ==
- Histoire de Frantz de Sickingen, chevalier allemand du seizième siècle, 1860 – History of Franz von Sickingen, German knight of the 16th century.
- Dictionnaire topographique de l'ancien département de la Moselle, 1874 – Topographical dictionary of the former department of Moselle.
- La guerre de Metz en 1324: poème du XIVʿ siècle; as editor (author: François Bonnardot, preface by Léon Gautier, 1875) – The War of Metz in 1324, poem of the 14th century.
- La famille de Jeanne d'Arc, 1878 – The family of Joan of Arc.
- Le maréchal Fabert d'après ses mémoires et sa correspondance, 1878 – Abraham de Fabert from his memoirs and correspondence.
- Nouvelles recherches sur la famille de Jeanne d'Arc, 1879 – New research on the family of Joan of Arc.
