= Ernest Langlois =

French medievalist

Ernest Langlois (French pronunciation: [ɛʁnɛst lɑ̃ɡlwa]; Heippes, 4 September 1857 – Lille, 15 July 1924) was a French medievalist, professor at the University of Lille.

He is best known for his 1910 work Les manuscrits du Roman de la Rose, description et classement, on the manuscripts of the Roman de la Rose and subsequent five-volume edition Le Roman de la Rose par Guillaume de Loris et Jean de Meun. This latter work was for the Société des anciens textes français, and was a reconstruction into the supposed dialect of Orléans of the time; the work is regarded as uneven, with judicious choice of readings but arbitrary corrections of orthography.

== Works ==
- Le Couronnement Looys (1888)
- Origines et sources du Roman de la Rose (1890)
- Le jeu de Robin et Marion (1896)
- Anciens proverbes français (1899)
- Recueil d’arts de seconde rhétorique (Paris, 1902) (full text)
- Table des noms propres de toute nature compris dans les chansons de geste imprimées (1904)
- Les manuscrits du Roman de la Rose, description et classement (1910)
- Le Roman de la Rose par Guillaume de Loris et Jean de Meun (1914-1924)
- Adam Le Bossu, Jeu du Pèlerin (1924) editor
