= Arnoul Gréban =

15th-century French organist and author

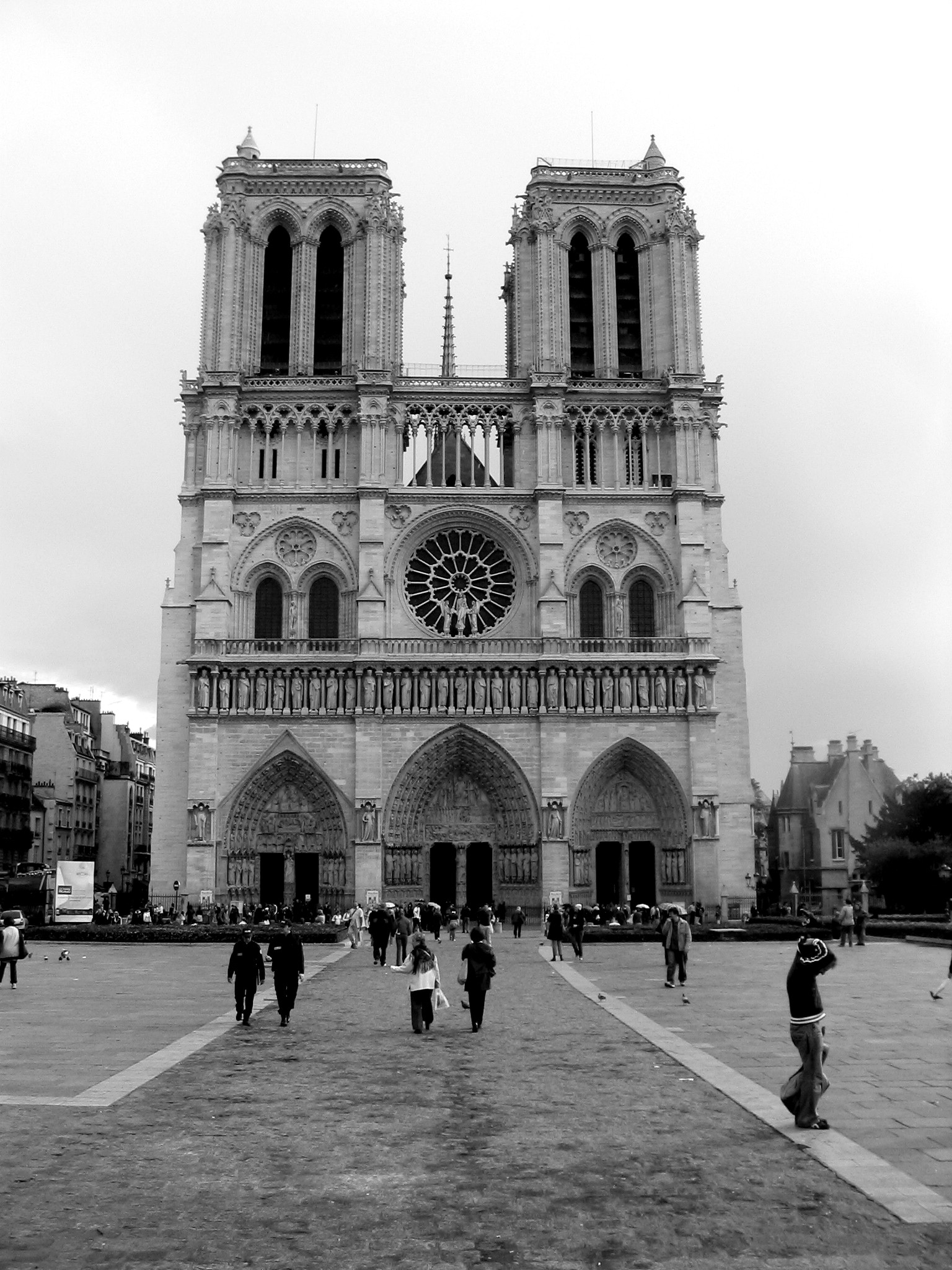
Cathédrale Notre-Dame de Paris

Arnoul Gréban (Le Mans before 1420 – Florence ca. 1485), a French organist at the Cathedrale Notre Dame de Paris, authored a Mystère de la Passion and with his brother Simon Gréban the Mystère des Actes des Apôtres.

Gréban may have come from the diocese of Cambrai; he lived in France and Italy. He was Master of Arts, bachelor of theology in 1458; from 1451 to 1456, he was organist and master of grammar and maître des enfants at the choir of Notre-Dame-de-Paris. He then served Charles, Count of Maine, until the death of the latter in 1472. He then left to Italy, was chaplain of San Lorenzo in Florence in 1476 and responsible for music at the House of Medici until 1485.

== See also ==
- Medieval French literature

== Bibliography ==
- Pierre Champion, "Arnoul Gréban, l'auteur du Mystère de la Passion", in Histoire poétique du XVe, Paris, 1923
- Henri Stein, "Arnoul Gréan, poète et musicien", in Bibliothèque de l'École des Chartes, t. 79, 1918, p. 142-146
- Darwin Smith (born 1951), Arnoul Gréban. Clerc, chanteur et pédagogue entre la France et l'Italie au XVe siècle, Thèse, Paris 1, 2010.

== See also ==
- Mystery play

Preceded by Jacques Le Mol	Organist, Cathédrale Notre-Dame de Paris; 1440-1453	Succeeded by Jehan Bailly
