= Paul Meyer (philologist) =

French philologist

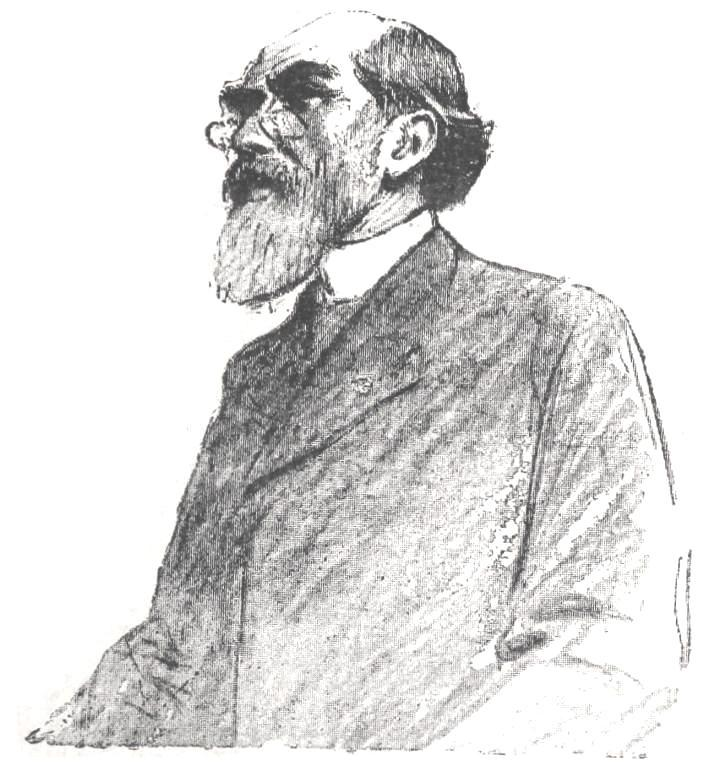
Paul Meyer at the eight session of the Zola trial. Illustration by Louis Rémy Sabattier for l'Illustration

Marie-Paul-Hyacinthe Meyer (17 January 1840, Paris – 7 September 1917, Saint-Mandé), was a French philologist.

== Biography ==
Meyer was born in Paris and educated at the Lycée Louis le Grand and the École des Chartes, specializing in the Romance languages.

In 1863 he joined the manuscript department of the Bibliothèque Nationale. He was keeper of the national archives from 1866 to 1872. In 1876 he became professor of the languages and literatures of southern Europe at the Collège de France. In 1882 he was made director of the École des Chartes, and a year later was nominated a member of the Academy of Inscriptions. He was one of the founders of the Revue critique (1865), and a founder and the chief contributor to Romania (1872).

Paul Meyer began with the study of old Provençal literature, but subsequently did valuable work in many different departments of romance literature, and ranked as the chief authority on the French language of his era.

He was a member of the Institute of France, and an associate of the British Academy.

== Works ==
- Rapports sur les documents manuscrits de l'ancienne littérature de la France conservés dans les bibliothèques de la Grande Bretagne (1871)
- Recueil d'anciens textes bas-latins, provençaux et français (2 parts, 1874–1876)
- Alexandre le Grand dans la littérature française du Moyen âge (2 vols., 1886).
- L'Apocalypse en français au XIIIe siècle (Paris MS fr. 403) (1900–1, with Léopold Delisle)

He edited several old French texts for the Société des anciens textes français, the Société de l'histoire de France and independently. Among these may be mentioned:

- Aye d'Avignon (1861), with Guessard
- Flamenca (1865)
- the Histoire of Guillaume le Maréchal (3 vols., 1892–1902)
- Raoul de Cambrai (1882), with Auguste Longnon
- Fragments d'une vie de Saint Thomas de Canterbury (1885)
- Guillaume de la Barre (1894).

== Honors ==
- He became honorary professor at the College of France in 1906.
- Commander in the Legion of Honor
