= Adolf Birch-Hirschfeld =

German medievalist and Romance scholar

Adolf Birch-Hirschfeld (1 October 1849, in Kiel – 11 January 1917, in Gautzsch) was a German medievalist and Romance scholar. He was a brother of pathologist Felix Victor Birch-Hirschfeld.

He studied philology at the University of Leipzig as a pupil of Adolf Ebert and Friedrich Karl Theodor Zarncke. He received his habilitation in 1878, and for several years conducted research in Paris. In 1884 he became a professor of modern languages at the University of Giessen, and in 1891 returned to Leipzig as a professor of Romance philology.

== Selected works ==
- Die Sage vom Gral; ihre Entwicklung und dichterische Ausbildung in Frankreich und Deutschland im 12. und 13. Jahrhundert, 1877 – The story of the Grail; its development and poetic formation in France and Germany in the 12th and 13th centuries.
- Über die den provenzalischen Troubadours des zwölften und dreizehnten Jahrhunderts bekannten epischen Stoffe, 1878 – On the Provençal troubadours of the 12th and 13th centuries.
- Geschichte der französischen Litteratur seit Anfang des XVI. Jahrhunderts, 1889 – History of French literature since the beginning of the 16th century.
- Geschichte der französischen litteratur von den ältesten zeiten bis zur gegenwart (with Hermann Suchier, 1900) – History of French literature from the earliest times to the present.
- Das fünfte Buch des Pantagruel und sein Verhältnis zu den authentischen Büchern des Romans, 1901 – The fifth book of Pantagruel and its relationship to the authentic books of the novel.
- Zum Gedächtnis an Richard Wülker, 1910 – In memory of Richard Paul Wülker.
