= Jacquemart Giélée =

French poet

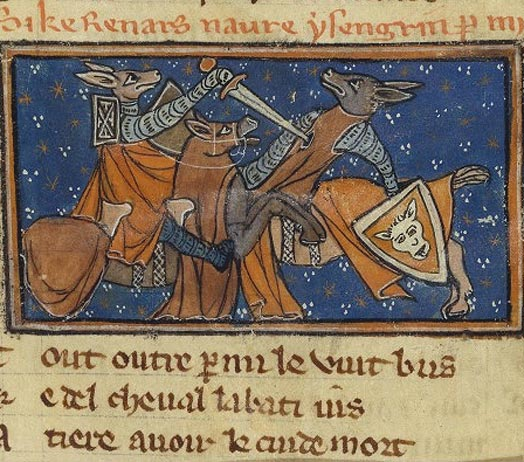
Illumination of the 1581 manuscript, f. 6 verso, Bibliothèque nationale de France, Paris

Jacquemart Giélée (often spelt Gielée) was a French poet of the Middle Ages born in Lille.

Around 1288, he wrote a sequel to the Roman de Renart, Renart le Nouvel, of more than 8000 verses. This moralized poem, with satirical accents, depicts the struggle between Noble, the lion, and Reynard, resulting in the triumph of evil. It is an allegory of the society of the time.

== Bibliography ==
- Jacquemart Gielee, Renart le Nou|vel, éd. Henri Roussel, Paris, Société des anciens textes français, 1961.
- Henri Roussel, Renart le Nouvel et Jacquemart Gielée. Étude littéraire, Lille, 1984.
