= Hermann Suchier =

German romanist (1848–1914)

Hermann Suchier (11 December 1848, in Carlshafen – 3 July 1914, in Halle an der Saale) was a German Romance philologist of Huguenot ancestry. He is known for his studies on the history of the French language and the literary history of the Middle Ages.

He studied philology and linguistics at the universities of Marburg and Leipzig, qualifying as a lecturer of modern languages at Marburg in 1873. Soon afterwards, he became an associate professor at the University of Zürich, followed by a full professorship at Münster Academy in 1875. In 1876, he was appointed chair of Romance philology at the University of Halle, where in 1901/02 he served as academic rector. In 1879, he founded the journal Bibliotheca normannica.

== Selected works ==
- Aucassin und Nicolete, 1878 – Aucassin and Nicolette.
- Bibliotheca normannica; Denkmäler normannischer Literatur und Sprache (from 1879) – Bibliotheca normannica; monuments of Norman literature and language.
- Oeuvres poétiques de Philippe de Remi, sire de Beaumanoir (2 volumes 1884–85) – Poetic works of Philippe de Rémi, father of Philippe de Beaumanoir.
- Altfranzösische Grammatik, 1893 – Old French grammar.
- Les Narbonnais; chanson de geste (2 volumes, 1898) – Aymeri de Narbonne; chanson de geste.
- Geschichte der französischen litteratur von den ältesten zeiten bis zur gegenwart (with Adolf Birch-Hirschfeld, 1900) – History of French literature from the earliest times to the present.
- Die französische und provenzalische Sprache und ihre Mundarten, 1906 – French and Provençal language and their dialects.
- La chançun de Guillelme. Französiches volksepos des XI. jahrhunderts, 1911 – Chanson de Guillaume; French epics of the 11th century.
