= Auguste Longnon =

French historian and archivist (1844–1911)

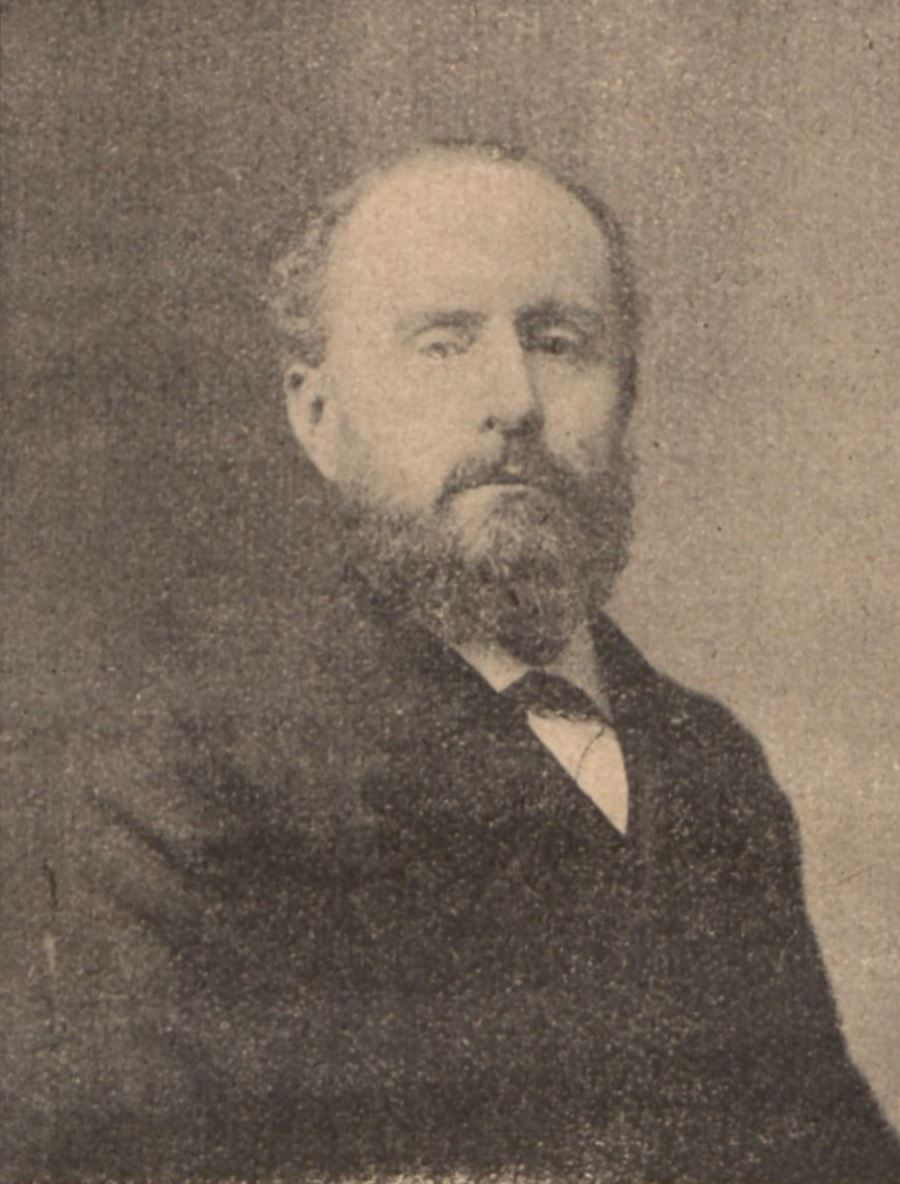
Auguste Longnon

Auguste Honoré Longnon (18 October 1844 – 12 July 1911) was a French historian and archivist. He is remembered for his research in the field of historical geography and for his edition of the 15th century poet, Francois Villon.

== Biography ==
Longnon was born on 18 October 1844, in Paris. Up to age 20, Longnon worked as a shoemaker for his father. From 1868, he studied at the École pratique des Hautes Études in Paris, and at the same time, worked at the National Archives as an assistant to Alfred Maury. Later on, he received a promotion as sous-chef at the Archives, and eventually became a director of studies at the École pratique des Hautes Études. From 1892 to 1911, he held the chair of historical geography at the Collège de France. In 1886, he was chosen as a member of the Académie des Inscriptions et Belles-Lettres. He died on 12 July 1911, in Paris.

== Published works ==
In the 1880s, Longnon published an atlas of French history, "Atlas historique de la France depuis César jusqu'à nos jours", that is considered to constitute the actual beginning of French historical atlases. The following is a listing of some of Longnon's many original works and editions of other authors:

- Études sur les pagi de la Gaule, 1869 – Studies on the pagi of Gaul.
- François Villon et ses légataires, 1873 – Francois Villon and his legatees.
- Géographie historique et administrative de la Gaule romaine, 1876-93 (with Ernest Desjardins) – Historical and administrative geography of Roman Gaul.
- Étude biographique sur François Villon, d'après les documents inédits conservés aux archives nationales, 1877 – Biographical study of François Villon, according to unpublished documents held by the National Archives.
- Géographie de la Gaule au VIe siècle, 1878 – Geography of Gaul in the 6th century.
- Atlas historique de la France depuis César jusqu'à nos jours, 1885-89 – Historical atlas of France from the time of Caesar up to the present.
- Dictionnaire topographique du département de la Marne, 1891 – Topographical dictionary of the département of Marne.
- Œuvres complètes de François Villon, publiées d'après les manuscrits et les plus anciennes éditions, 1892 – Complete works of François Villon.
- Méliador. Roman comprenant les poésies lyriques de Wenceslas de Bohême, duc de Luxembourg et de Brabant, (main author: Jean Froissart, published for the first time by Longnon) 1895-99 – "Meliador". Including lyrical poems of Wenceslas of Bohemia, duke of Luxembourg and of Brabant.
- Origine des noms de communes du département de la Haute-Marne, 1908 – The origin of commune names in the department of Haute-Marne.
- Origines & formation de la nationalité française; éléments ethniques--unité territoriale, 1912 – Origins and formation of French national identity; ethnic elements, territorial units.
- Les noms de lieu de la France; leur origine, leur signification, leurs transformations, issued in 5 parts; 1920-29 (other authors: Léon Mirot, Paul Georges François Joseph Marichal) – Place names of France, their origins, meanings, transformations.
