= Antoine Thomas (linguist) =

French linguist (1857-1935)

Antoine Thomas (29 November 1857, Saint-Yrieix-la-Montagne – 17 May 1935, Paris) was a French linguist. He is known for his work with Adolphe Hatzfeld and Arsène Darmesteter, on the Dictionnaire général de la langue française du commencement du XVIIe siècle à nos jours, which was issued in parts from 1890 to 1900. He supplied etymological notes.

He was the eldest of five siblings comprising three sisters, Marie, Henriette Laurentine and Joséphine, as well as the youngest, a brother, Victor Thomas, who went on to establish the École nationale supérieure de chimie de Clermont-Ferrand.

From 1875 to 1878 he studied at the École des Chartes, afterwards spending several years associated with the École française de Rome. He did his doctoral dissertation on Francesco da Barberino. In 1883 he became a lecturer of Romance languages and literature at the Faculty of Letters of Toulouse, and from 1888 taught classes at the Sorbonne, where in 1901 he was appointed a full professor of medieval literature and Romance philology.

From 1895 to 1910 he was director of studies in Romance philology at the École pratique des Hautes Études. In 1904 he was elected a member of the Académie des Inscriptions et Belles-Lettres.

== Publications ==
- Les États généraux sous Charles VII. Étude chronologique d’après des documents inédits, Cabinet historique, 1878.
- Les États provinciaux de la France centrale sous Charles VII, 2 vol, thèse de l’École des chartes, 1879-1880.
- Rapport sur une mission philologique dans le département de la Creuse, 1879.
- Les États provinciaux de la France centrale sous Charles VII, Revue historique, 1879.
- Les miracles de Notre-Dame de Chartres. Texte latin inédit, in Bibliothèque de l’École des Chartes, 1881
- Inventaire-sommaire des archives communales de Limoges antérieures à 1790, Limoges, 1882.
- Extraits des archives du Vatican pour servir à l’histoire littéraire du Moyen Âge, in Mélanges de l'École française de Rome, 1882-1884.
- Nouvelles recherches sur l’Entrée d’Espagne, chanson de geste franco-italienne, in Bibliothèques des Écoles françaises d’Athènes et de Rome, 1882.
- Francesco da Barberino et la littérature provençale en Italie au Moyen Âge, thèse principale de doctorat, 1883.
- De Joannis de Monsterolio vita et operibus, sive de romanarum litterarum studio apud Gallos instaurato Carolo VI regnante, thèse complémentaire, 1883.
- Documents historiques bas-latins, provençaux et français, concernant principalement la Marche et le Limousin, 2 volumes en collaboration avec Alfred Leroux et Émile Molinier, 1883-1885.
- Les registres de Boniface VIII. Recueil des bulles de ce pape publiées ou analysées d’après les manuscrits originaux des archives du Vatican, 4 volumes, édition en collaboration avec G. Digard, R. Fawtier et M. Faucon, 1884-1935.
- Bertrand de Born. Poésies complètes, édition avec introduction, notes et glossaire, 1888.
- Dictionnaire général de la langue française du commencement du XVIIe siècle jusqu’à nos jours, précédé d’un traité de la formation de la langue, 2 volumes en collaboration avec A. Hatzfeld et A. Darmesteter, 1890-1900.
- Essais de philologie française, 1897.
- Étymologies gasconnes, 1902.
- Mélanges d’étymologie française, 1902, 2e édition revue et annotée en 1927.
- Nouveaux essais de philologie française, 1904.
- Cartulaire du prieuré de Notre-Dame-du-Pont en Haute-Auvergne, précédé de la biographie de son fondateur, Bertrand de Grifeuille, textes inédits du XII, Annales du Midi, 1908.
- Le comté de la Marche et le Parlement de Poitiers (1418-1436), recueil de documents inédits tirés des archives nationales, précédé d’une étude sur la géographie historique de la Marche au XIV et XVe siècles, 1910.
- L’entrée d’Espagne, chanson de geste franco-italienne, publiée d’après le manuscrit unique de Venise, 2 volumes, 1913.
- La chanson de sainte Foi d’Agen, poème provençal du XIe siècle, fac-similé, traduction, notes et glossaire, 1925.
- La Somme du code, texte dauphinois de la région de Grenoble, publié d’après un manuscrit du XIII appartenant à la Bibliothèque du Château d’Uriage, en collaboration avec L. Royer, 1929.
- Jean de Gerson et l’éducation des dauphins de France, étude critique, suivie du texte de deux de ses opuscules et documents inédits sur Jean Majoris, précepteur de Louis XI, 1930.

== Bibliography ==
- Académie des Inscriptions et Belles-lettres, fiche André Antoine Thomas (see: membres/académiciens depuis 1663).
- François Olivier-Martin : Notice sur la vie et les travaux de M. Antoine Thomas (1857–1935), Compte-rendus des séances de l’Académie des Inscriptions et Belles-Lettres n°4, 1943, p. 591-608.
- Alfred Jeanroy : Antoine Thomas (1857-1935), Annales du Midi n°47, 1935, p. 426-431.
