= Julia Bastin =

Belgian writer (1888–1968)

Julia Bastin (June 16, 1888 – October 26, 1968) was a Belgian academic, educator and novelist.

== Biography ==
She was born in Liège and grew up there. Bastin studied at The Hague, earning a diploma that allowed her to teach Dutch. From 1912 to 1914, she taught at a middle school in Braine-le-Comte. Bastin spent World War I in England and studied languages at Bedford College, particularly French literature from the Middle Ages. She was also a teaching assistant for French conversation and composition courses at the college. Afterwards, she taught in secondary schools in Derbyshire and then Yorkshire. From 1920 to 1931, she lived in Paris, attending the École pratique des hautes études and the Sorbonne where she studied Old French and Old Occitan. She was able to attend classes taught by Alfred Jeanroy and Edmond Faral.

In 1928, she translated Aldous Huxley's novel Crome Yellow into French as Jaune de Crome. In 1932, she translated Johan Huizinga's Herfsttijd der Middeleeuwen into French as Le déclin du Moyen Âge. That same year, she translated Huxley's Those Barren Leaves into French as Marina di Vezza; that translation was awarded the Académie française's Prix Langlois.

In 1929 and 1930, Bastin published the two volumes of Recueil général des Isopets, a collection of fables from the Middle Ages. With Edmond Faral, she was editor for Onze Poèmes concernant la Croisade, par Rutebeuf, published in 1946, and for Œuvres complètes de Rutebeuf, which was released in two volumes in 1958 and 1960.

In 1931, she joined the Romance studies department of the Université libre de Bruxelles. She became the first female member of the Académie royale de langue et de littérature françaises de Belgique in 1947.

Bastin died in Berchem-Sainte-Agathe at the age of 80.
