= François Bonnardot =

French archivist and historian (1843–1926)

François Bonnardot (19 November 1843, in Demigny – 10 May 1926, in Conflans-Sainte-Honorine) was a French archivist and historian.

He studied at the École des Chartes and École des Hautes Études, and from 1868 worked as an archivist in Orléans. In 1872 he was named deputy inspector of historical services for the city of Paris, then from 1898 he served as curator at the library in Verdun.

In 1890 he was named president of the Société de Linguistique de Paris.

== Selected works ==
- Chartes francaises de Lorraine et de Metz, 1873 – French charters of Lorraine and Metz.
- La guerre de Metz en 1324: poème du XIVe siècle (with Ernest de Bouteiller, 1875) – The War of Metz in 1324; a fourteenth century poem.
- Le saint voyage de Jherusalem du Seigneur d'Anglure (with Auguste Longnon, 1878) – later translated into English and published as The Holy Jerusalem Voyage of Ogier VIII, Seigneur d'Anglure (1975).
- Les métiers et corporations de la ville de Paris : XIIIe siècle (with René de Lespinasse, 1879; original author Étienne Boileau) – The trades and corporations of the city of Paris in the 13th century.
- Essai historique sur le régime municipal à Orléans, d'après les documents conservés aux archives de la ville, 1389-1790, (1881) – Historical essay on the municipal system in Orléans, according to documents preserved in the city archives, 1389–1790.
- Le Psautier du Metz; texte du XIVe siècle, 1884 – The Psalter of Metz; text of the fourteenth century.
