= Duncan McMillan (linguist) =

British linguist

- Born: 1914
- Died: 1 June 1993 (aged 78–79)

Duncan McMillan (1914 – 1 June 1993) was a British linguist and philologist. He was John Orr Professor of French Language and Romance Linguistics at the University of Edinburgh and a founder of Société Internationale Rencesvals. McMillan was a winner of Rothschild Prize.
