= Gaston Paris =

French historian and Romance scholar (1839–1903)

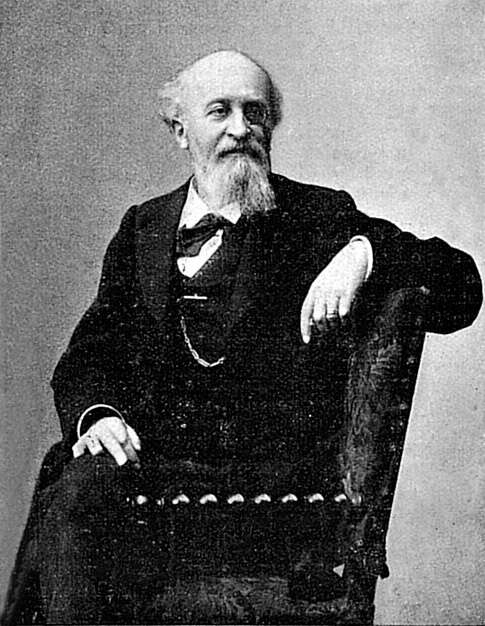
- Born: 9 August 1839; Avenay, France
- Died: 5 March 1903 (aged 63); Cannes, France
- Relatives: Paulin Paris

Academic background
- Education: University of Bonn; École Nationale des Chartes

Academic work
- Discipline: literary history
- Institutions: Collège de France
- Notable students: Jules Gilliéron
- Main interests: Romance studies and medieval French literature
- Notable works: Histoire poétique de Charlemagne

Bruno Paulin Gaston Paris (French pronunciation: [ɡastɔ̃ paʁis]; 9 August 1839 – 5 March 1903) was a French literary historian, philologist, and scholar specialized in Romance studies and medieval French literature. He was nominated for the Nobel Prize in Literature in 1901, 1902, and 1903.

== Biography ==
Gaston Paris was born under the July Monarchy at Avenay (Marne), the son of Paulin Paris, an important French scholar of medieval French literature. In his childhood, Gaston learned to appreciate Old French romances as poems and stories, and this early impulse for the study of Romance literature was placed on a solid basis by courses of study at the University of Bonn (1856), in the German Confederation, and at the École Nationale des Chartes, at the time under the rule of the Second French Empire.

Paris taught French grammar in a private school, later succeeding his father as professor of medieval French literature at the Collège de France in 1872; in 1876 he was admitted to the Académie des Inscriptions et Belles-Lettres, and in 1896 to the Académie Française; in 1895 he was appointed director of the Collège de France. He won a reputation as a renowned scholar of Romance literature throughout Europe. In Bonn he had learnt the scientific methods of exact research, but besides being an accurate philologist he was a literary critic of great acumen and breadth of view, and brought a singularly clear mind to bear on his favourite study of medieval French literature. His Vie de saint Alexis (1872) broke new ground and provided a model for future editors of medieval texts. It included the original text and the variations of it dating from the 12th, 13th, and 14th centuries. He contributed largely to the Histoire littéraire de la France, and with Paul Meyer published Romania, an academic journal devoted to the study of Romance literature.

In 1877 Gaston Paris was invited to Sweden for the 400th anniversary of the Upsala University, where he was made an honorary doctor. Before returning home he also visited Kristiania (Oslo) to take part in a celebration of the Norwegian philosopher Marcus Jacob Monrad. At the University of Oslo Gaston Paris also held a lecture about the two folktale collectors, Asbjørnsen and Moe, which he believed to be, besides the Brothers Grimm, the best re-tellers of the genre.

He received the German Order Pour le Mérite (civil class) in August 1902. Paris died in Cannes in 1903.

== Works ==
- Histoire poétique de Charlemagne (1865)
- Les Plus anciens monuments de la langue française (1875)
- Manuel d'ancien Français (1888)
- Mystère de la passion by Arnoul Gréban (1878), in collaboration with Gaston Raynaud
- Deux rédactions du roman des sept sages de Rome (1876)
- a translation of the Grammaire des langues romanes (1874–1878) of Friedrich Diez, in collaboration with MM. Brachet and Morel-Fatio.
- La Poésie du Moyen Âge (1885 and 1895)
- Penseurs et poètes (1897)
- Poèmes et légendes du moyen âge (1900)
- François Villon (1901), an admirable monograph contributed to the "Grands Écrivains Français" series
- Legendes du Moyen Âge (1903).
- Summary of medieval French literature forms a volume of the Temple Primers.

Paris endeared himself to a wide circle of scholars outside his own country by his unfailing urbanity and generosity. In France, he trained a band of disciples at the École des Chartes and the Collège de France who continued the traditions of exact research that he established. Among them were Leopold Pannier; Marius Sepet, the author of Le Drame chrétien au Moyen Âge (1878) and Origines catholiques du théâtre moderne (1901); Charles Joret; Alfred Morel-Fatio; Gaston Raynaud, who was responsible for various volumes of the excellent editions published by the Société des anciens textes français; Arsène Darmesteter; and others.
