= Arsène Darmesteter =

French philologist

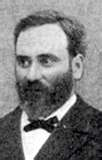
Arsène Darmesteter

Arsène Darmesteter (5 January 1846 – 16 November 1888) was a French philologist and man of letters.

== Biography ==
He studied under Gaston Paris at the École pratique des hautes études, and became professor of Old French language and literature at the Sorbonne, where he met his wife, the painter Héléna Hartog. His Life of Words appeared in English in 1888. He also collaborated with Adolphe Hatzfeld in a Dictionnaire général de la langue française (2 vols., 1895–1900). Among his most important work was the elucidation of Old French by means of the many glosses in the medieval writings of Rashi and other French Jews.

His scattered papers on Romance and Jewish philology were collected by James Darmesteter as Arsène Darmesteter, reliques scientifiques (2 vols., 1890). His valuable Cours de grammaire historique de la langue française was edited after his death by E. Muret and L. Sudre (1891–1895; English edition, 1902).
