= Arthur Piaget =

Swiss historian and linguist (1865–1952)

- Born: Arthur; 25 November 1865; Yverdon, Switzerland
- Died: 15 April 1952 (aged 55); Neuchâtel, Germany
- Education: University of Geneva
- Scientific career
- Fields: Historian, archivist, Roman philologist

Arthur Piaget (25 November 1865, in Yverdon – 15 April 1952, in Neuchâtel) was a Swiss historian, archivist and Romance philologist. He was the father of the psychologist Jean Piaget.

== Personal life ==
In 1888, he received his PhD from the University of Geneva, and in 1890, obtained his degree for history and philology at the École pratique des hautes études in Paris. During his stay in Paris, he was influenced by the teachings of Gaston Paris and Gabriel Monod. From 1894 to 1938, he was a professor of Romance languages and literature at the Academy of Neuchâtel (since 1909 known as the University of Neuchâtel). In 1909–11, he served as university rector.

In 1898, he founded the Seminar for Reformation History at the faculty of theology at Neuchâtel. From 1898 to 1935, he served as cantonal archivist. For many years, he was editor of the journal Musée neuchâtelois (1902–49).

== Selected works ==
- Martin Le Franc, prévôt de Lausanne, 1888 – Martin le Franc, provost of Lausanne.
- Oton de Granson et ses poésies, 1890 – Otton de Grandson and his poems.
- Poésies françaises sur la bataille de Marignan, 1892 – French poems on the Battle of Marignano.
- Le Miroir aux dames; poème inédit du XVe siècle, 1908 – Le Miroir aux dames; an unfinished poem of the 15th century.
- Documents inédits sur la Réformation dans le pays de Neuchâtel, 1909 – Unpublished documents on the Reformation in the lands of Neuchâtel.
- Notes sur Le livre des martyrs de Jean Crespin, 1930 – Notes on "The Book of Martyrs" by Jean Crespin.
- Pages d'histoire neuchâteloise, 1935 – Pages of Neuchâtel history.

== Archive sources ==
- PIAGET ARTHUR, Fonds: Arthur Piaget (1893-1942). Archives de l'État de Neuchâtel.
