= Académie des Inscriptions et Belles-Lettres =

French learned society

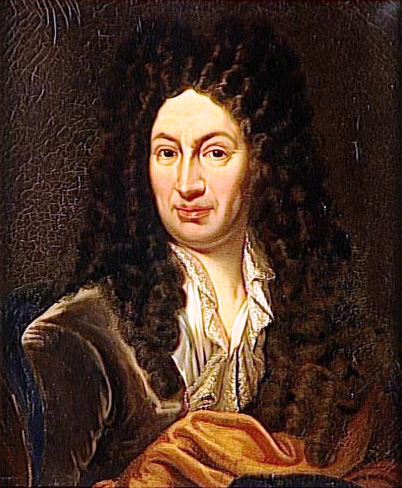
Jean Chapelain, one of the five founding members of the Académie

The Académie des Inscriptions et Belles-Lettres (French pronunciation: [akademi dez‿ɛ̃skʁipsjɔ̃ e bɛl lɛtʁ]) is a French learned society devoted to history, founded in February 1663 as one of the five academies of the Institut de France. The academy's scope is the study of ancient inscriptions (epigraphy), historical literature (see Belles-lettres) and the cultures of the civilizations of antiquity, the Middle Ages, and the classical period, as well as those of non-European civilizations.

== History ==
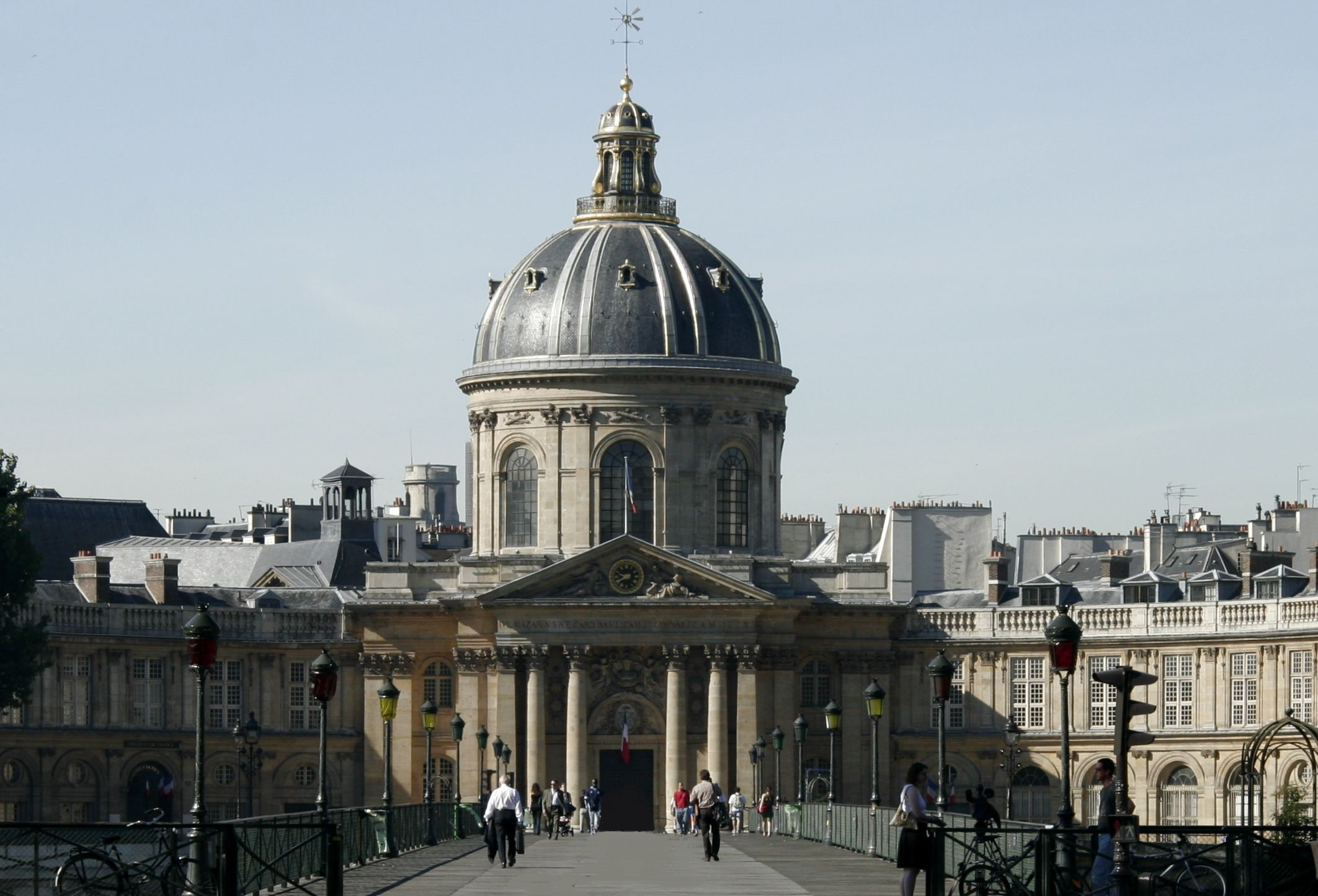
Institut de France in Paris, the seat of the Académie des Inscriptions et Belles-Lettres

The Académie originated in 1663 as a small council of humanists, "scholars who were the most versed in the knowledge of history and antiquity": Jean Chapelain, François Charpentier, Jacques Cassagne, Amable de Bourzeys, and Charles Perrault. In another source, Perrault is not mentioned, and other original members are named as François Charpentier and a M. Douvrier. The organizer was King Louis XIV's finance minister Jean-Baptiste Colbert. Its first name was the Académie royale des Inscriptions et Médailles, and its mission was to compose or obtain Latin inscriptions to be written on public monuments and medals issued to celebrate the events of Louis' reign. However, under Colbert's management, the Académie performed many additional roles, such as determining the art that would decorate the Palace of Versailles.

In 1683 Minister Louvois increased the membership to eight. In 1701 its membership was expanded to 40 and reorganized under the leadership of Chancellor Pontchartrain. It met twice a week at the Louvre, its members began to receive significant pensions, and was made an official state institution on the king's decree. In January 1716 it was permanently renamed to the Académie royale des Inscriptions et Belles-Lettres with the broader goal of elevating the prestige of the French monarchy using physical symbols uncovered or recovered through the methods of classical erudition.

The Académie produced a catalogue of medals created in honor of Louis XIV, Médailles sur les événements du règne de Louis le Grand, avec des explications historiques, first published in 1702. A second edition was published in 1723, eight years after Louis' death. Each page of the catalogue featured engraved images of the obverse and reverse of a single medal, followed by a lengthy description of the event upon which it was based. The second edition added some medals for events prior to 1700 which were not included in the first volume, and in some cases the images of medals in the earlier edition were altered, resulting in an improved version. The catalogues may therefore be seen as an artistic effort to enhance the king's image, rather than as an accurate historical record.

== Role ==
In the words of the Académie's charter, it is:

primarily concerned with the study of the monuments, the documents, the languages, and the cultures of the civilizations of antiquity, the Middle Ages, and the classical period, as well as those of non-European civilizations.

Today the academy is composed of fifty-five French members, forty associate foreign members, fifty French corresponding members, and fifty foreign corresponding members. The seats are distributed evenly among "orientalists" (scholars of Asia and the Islamic world, from ancient times), "antiquists" (scholars of Greece, Rome, and Gaul, including archaeologists, numismatists, philologists and historians), "medievalists", and a fourth miscellaneous group of linguists, law historians, historians of religion, historians of thought, and prehistorians.

The Volney Prize is awarded by the Institut de France, based on the proposal of the Académie. It publishes Mémoires.

== Prizes, grants and medals awarded by the Académie ==
Prizes

- Prix Ambatielos
- Prix d'histoire des religions de la fondation "Les Amis de Pierre-Antoine Bernheim"
- Prix des antiquités de la France
- Prix Emile Benveniste
- Prix Bordin
- Prix du budget
- Prix Honoré Chavée
- Prix Croiset
- Prix Duchalais
- Prix Paule Dumesnil
- Prix Roman et Tania Ghirshman
- Prix Gobert
- Prix Hirayama
- Prix de la Grange
- Prix Serge Lancel
- Prix Raymond et Yvonne Lantier
- Prix Marie-Françoise et Jean Leclant
- Prix Gaston Maspero
- Prix Jean-Charles Perrot
- Prix George Perrot
- Prix Jeanine et Roland Plottel
- Prix Saintour
- Prix Émile Sénart
- Prix Léon Vandermeesch
- Prix de l'Institut de France 2018
- Prix de la Fondation Colette Caillat
- Grand Prix d'archéologie de la Fondation Simone et Cino del Duca
- Prix Jean_Edouard Goby
- Prix Hugot
- Prix Stanislas Julien

Grants

- Subvention Louis de Clercq
- Bourse Courtois
- Subvention de la Fondation Dourlans
- Subvention Garnier-Lestamy
- Subvention Max Serres de la Fondation Eve Delacroix
- Bourse Jacques Vandier

Medals

- Médailles des Antiquités de la France
- Médaille Jean-Jacques Berger
- Médaille Clermont-Ganneau
- Médaille du Baron de Courcel
- Médaille Delalande-Guérineau
- Médaille Drouin
- Médaille Alfred Dutens
- Médaille Fould
- Médaille Gobert
- Médaille Stanislas Julien
- Médaille le Fèvre-Deumier
- Médaille Gustave Mendel
- Médaille Gabriel-Auguste Prost

== Prominent members ==
- Eugène Albertini
- Antoine Anselme
- Jean Sylvain Bailly
- Anatole Jean-Baptiste Antoine de Barthélemy
- Charles Batteux
- Pierre Louis Jean Casimir de Blacas
- Michel Bréal
- Antoine Leonard de Chézy
- Charles Simon Clermont-Ganneau
- Jean-Baptiste Colbert
- Henri Cordier
- André Dacier
- Léopold Delisle
- Jean Denis, comte Lanjuinais
- Gabriel Devéria
- Louis Duchesne
- Émile Egger
- Jean-Baptiste Benoît Eyriès
- André Félibien
- Jean François Boissonade de Fontarabie
- Nicolas Fréret
- Bernard le Bovier de Fontenelle
- Étienne Fourmont
- Antoine Galland
- Ernst Hoepffner
- Pierre Amédée Jaubert
- Stanislas Julien
- Alexandre Maurice Blanc de Lanautte, Comte d'Hauterive
- Pierre Henri Larcher
- Jean Lebeuf
- Edmond Le Blant
- Charles-François Lebrun, duc de Plaisance
- Jean Leclant
- Émile Littré
- Leonardo López Luján
- Jean Mabillon
- Louis Ferdinand Alfred Maury
- Joachim Menant
- Franz Miklosich
- Agénor Azéma de Montgravier
- Jean Marie Pardessus
- Alexis Paulin Paris
- Claude-Emmanuel de Pastoret
- Armand-Pierre Caussin de Perceval
- Charles Perrault
- Francois Pouqueville
- Louis Racine
- Charles-Frédéric Reinhard
- Jacques Nicolas Augustin Thierry
- Jacques de Tourreil
- Anne Robert Jacques Turgot, Baron de Laune
- Joseph Vendryes
- William Henry Waddington
- Charles Athanase Walckenaer
- Henri-Alexandre Wallon

== Publications ==
- Publications of the Académie des Inscriptions et Belles-Lettres (1710-1843)

== See also ==
- French art salons and academies
