= Jakob Joseph Matthys =

Swiss Catholic priest (1802-1866)

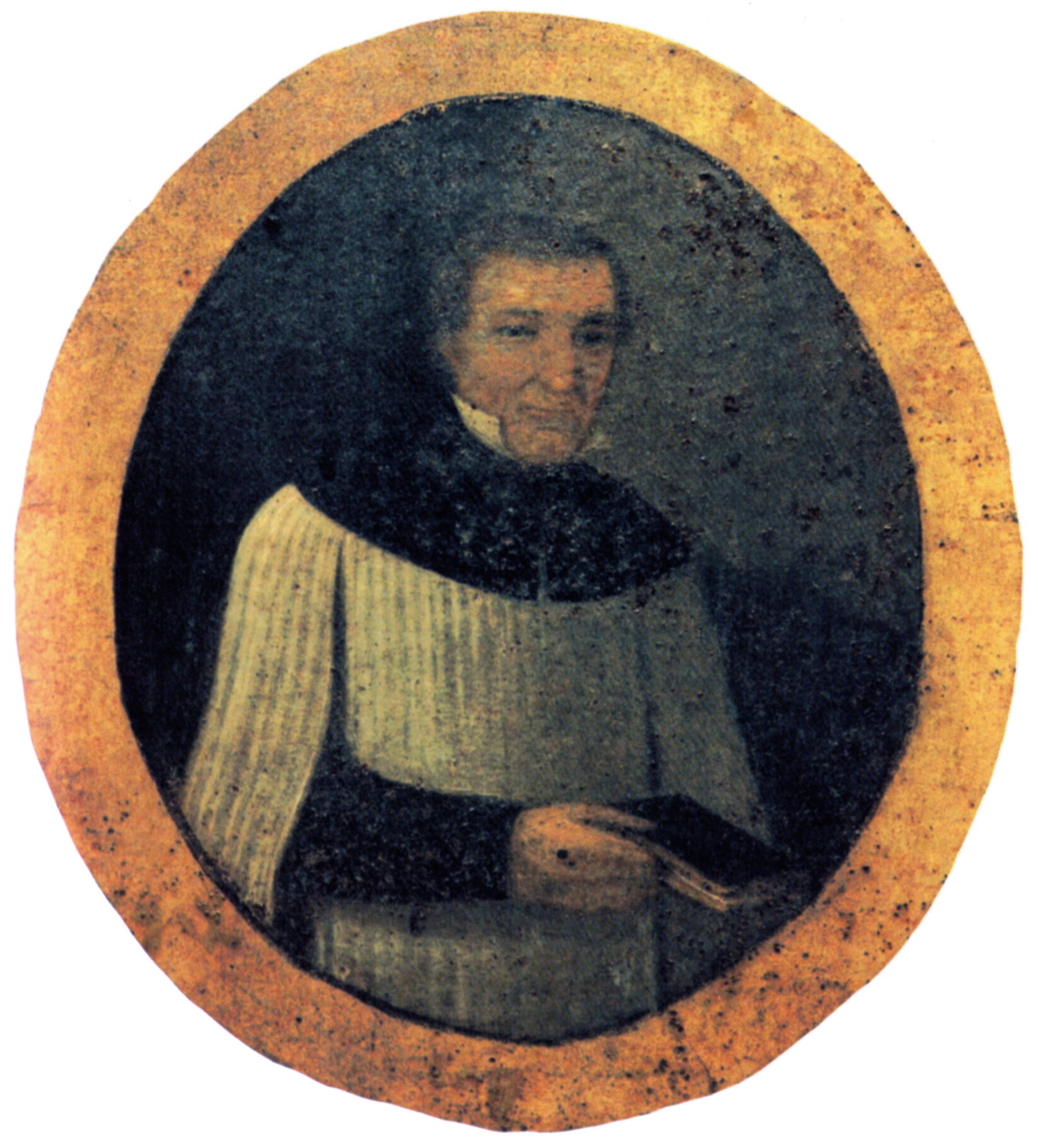
Matthys' tombstone portrait

Jakob Joseph Matthys (the family name is also spelled Mathis and Mathys; born 12 December 1802 in Oberrickenbach, municipality of Wolfenschiessen; died 9 March 1866 in Stans) was a Catholic priest who served as chaplain in Niederrickenbach for about 15 years and as chaplain in Dallenwil for about 20 years.

Primarily in his first position, which by far did not fill him, he dealt with at least 37 foreign languages as well as a now forgotten planned language. He wrote his own biography in 1844 in 35 languages, including the native dialect and the native written language.

When Matthys learned in 1862 of the project for the Schweizerisches Idiotikon that had just begun, he worked out a monumental Nidwalden dictionary - a folio of 611 closely written pages - as well as an 89-page dialect grammar despite illness and sent both to Zurich. The dictionary is still one of the most important Nidwalden sources of the Idiotikon editorial staff, and the grammar is of importance in the history of science.

== Life ==
=== Childhood and study ===
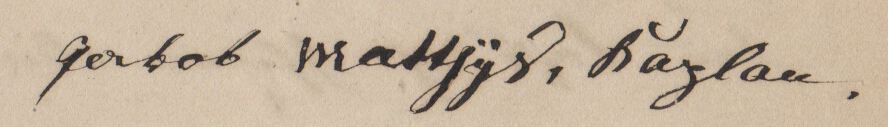
Signature "Jakob Matthys, Chaplain" (Archive of the Schweizerischen Idiotikons)

Matthys was a son of Niklaus Josef Mathis, a small farmer and - after he had sold his small estate out of necessity - a day labor, and Anna Josefa, née Käslin. He grew up in great poverty, from six to sixteen in Beckenried, his mother's home village. As a boy, he tended goats on the Buochserhorn, combed silk and spun cotton; later, he gathered resin with his father, searched for roots for doctors and distillers, and wood for coopers and other craftsmen. As he grew older, he worked as a farmhand.

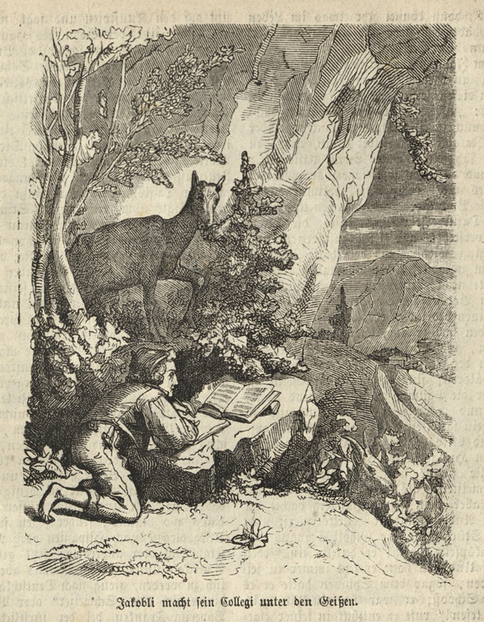
"Jakobli macht sein Collegi unter den Geißen" (Illustration in the St. Ursenkalender 1872)

Matthys did not attend school until he was 21 years old. He taught himself reading, writing and arithmetic. It was said of the fifteen-year-old lad that anyone in the area who had to calculate a haystack, a livestock lease or a "Käslosung" had this done by young Matthys. From 1821 to January 1823 he served in Bavaria with one of the princes of Oettingen as a "Swiss servant". In 1822 he bought the Latin grammar and the Latin-German dictionary of Christian Gottlieb Broeder at the market of the "nearby city" and began to learn Latin. He continued this self-study in the summer of 1823, when he was a shepherd high above Engelberg. In order not to have to constantly look up words in the dictionary, he learned it by heart without further ado.

The chaplain at home became aware of the young man and found him a patron in the painter Martin Obersteg the Younger, so that Matthys was able to attend the Capuchin-run Latin school in Stans from December 1823. Learning was easy for him - instead of four years he completed the school in two and a half. In the school year 1826/1827 he was at the Jesuit College of Solothurn, where he immediately took the second to last year's course before transferring to the university. In 1828 he studied at the Jesuit College St. Michael in Fribourg, from 1829 to 1831 at the Seminary in Lucerne and in 1831/1832 at the Seminary in Chur - there he always graduated with top grades. Since his patron had died in the meantime, he had to earn his living as a tutor. On 6 March 1831 he received the minor orders, already on 13 March he had become subdeacon, on 19 March deacon and on 25 March he received the ordination to the priesthood.

=== As pilgrimage chaplain in Maria-Rickenbach (1831–1845) ===
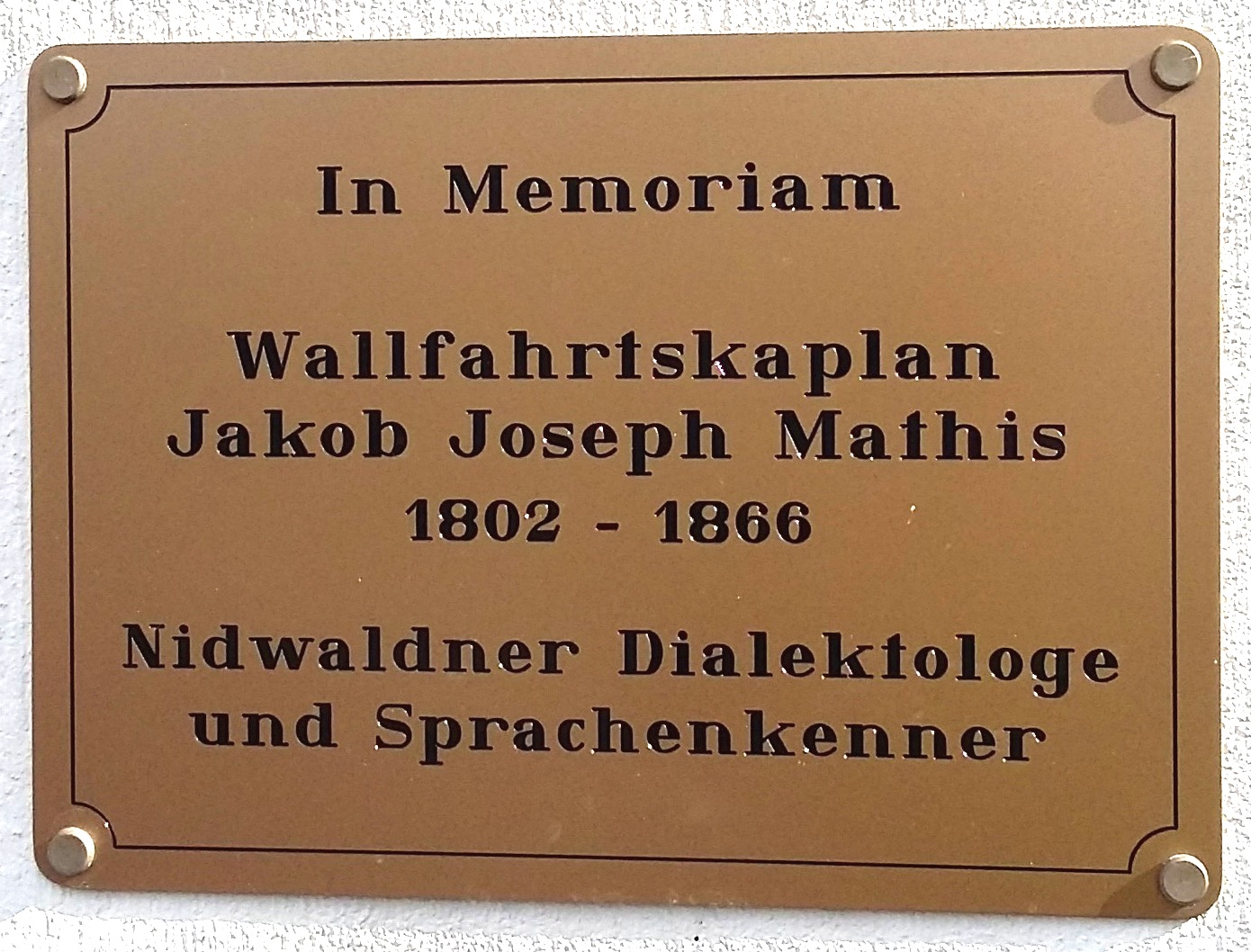
Memorial plaque for Matthys in Maria-Rickenbach

As a child from a poor family, Matthys had to look for a position as soon as possible. On 6 November 1831 he was elected chaplain in Niederrickenbach (Municipality of Oberdorf), where he was responsible as pilgrimage chaplain. The small mountain village, lonely and situated at an altitude of about 1200 meters, was at that time only a moderately visited place of pilgrimage and there was also no monastery. Matthys had little to do during the winter months, and there were few children to teach. In his autobiography Matthys enumerated in seven points all the things that had been concealed from him in order to distract from the lack of attractiveness of the chaplaincy, which therefore nobody but he had wanted. During this time he took refuge in a restless study of languages. The benefice, however, only came with about 500 guilders - clearly too little for Matthys, who was dependent on many expensive books for his language learning, had to support his penniless relatives, and increasingly suffered from health problems.

Learning foreign languages apparently appealed to Matthys more than his chaplain duties - in any case, the reports on his spiritual work are "extraordinarily scarce". Nevertheless, in 1835 he published a revision of the pilgrimage booklet of Maria-Rickenbach, the frommen Wallfahrters. New in it were the many quotations from Latin and Greek church fathers, teachers and writers, whom he invokes as witnesses to Marian devotion - in the series of mentions in the pious pilgrimage booklet Bernard of Clairvaux, Gregory, Eucherius, Anselm, Bonaventure, Ephräm, Ambrose, Jerome, Thomas Aquinas, Antoninus of Florence, John of Damascus, Augustine, Basil, William of Paris, Ildefonsus, Rupert, Irenaeus, Epiphanios, Athanasius, Anthony of Padua, Germanus, Albertus Magnus, Peter Damian, Beda Venerabilis, Ignatius, Methodius and Sophronius. Matthys evidently not only learned vast amounts of languages during these years, but also immersed himself in patristics.

The Maria-Rickenbach period also saw Matthys' fight against a new textbook of 1835 that allegedly did not conform to official Catholic dogma (see below), which further embittered him and turned him into a grouchy loner. The construction of the new chaplain's house, which dragged on until 1842 or 1843, also troubled Matthys - in the only half-finished house he could not heat during the winter and suffered from gout and rheumatism. Bathing cures, however, were expensive, since he had to hire a curate's clergyman for each day of his absence. Matthys therefore strove for another position, but set up loud barriers for himself: For example, he rejected the chaplaincy of Oberrickenbach offered to him, which held a prospect of the parish of Wolfenschiessen, because he did not want it to appear that he was only waiting for the passing of the Wolfenschiessen pastor. In any case, his solitary nature meant that he was only incompletely informed when a vacancy occurred somewhere.

The multilingual biography written during this difficult period has shaped the all too one-sided image of Matthys as that of an unfortunate eccentric.

=== As chaplain in Dallenwil (1845-1864) and the last years in Stans ===
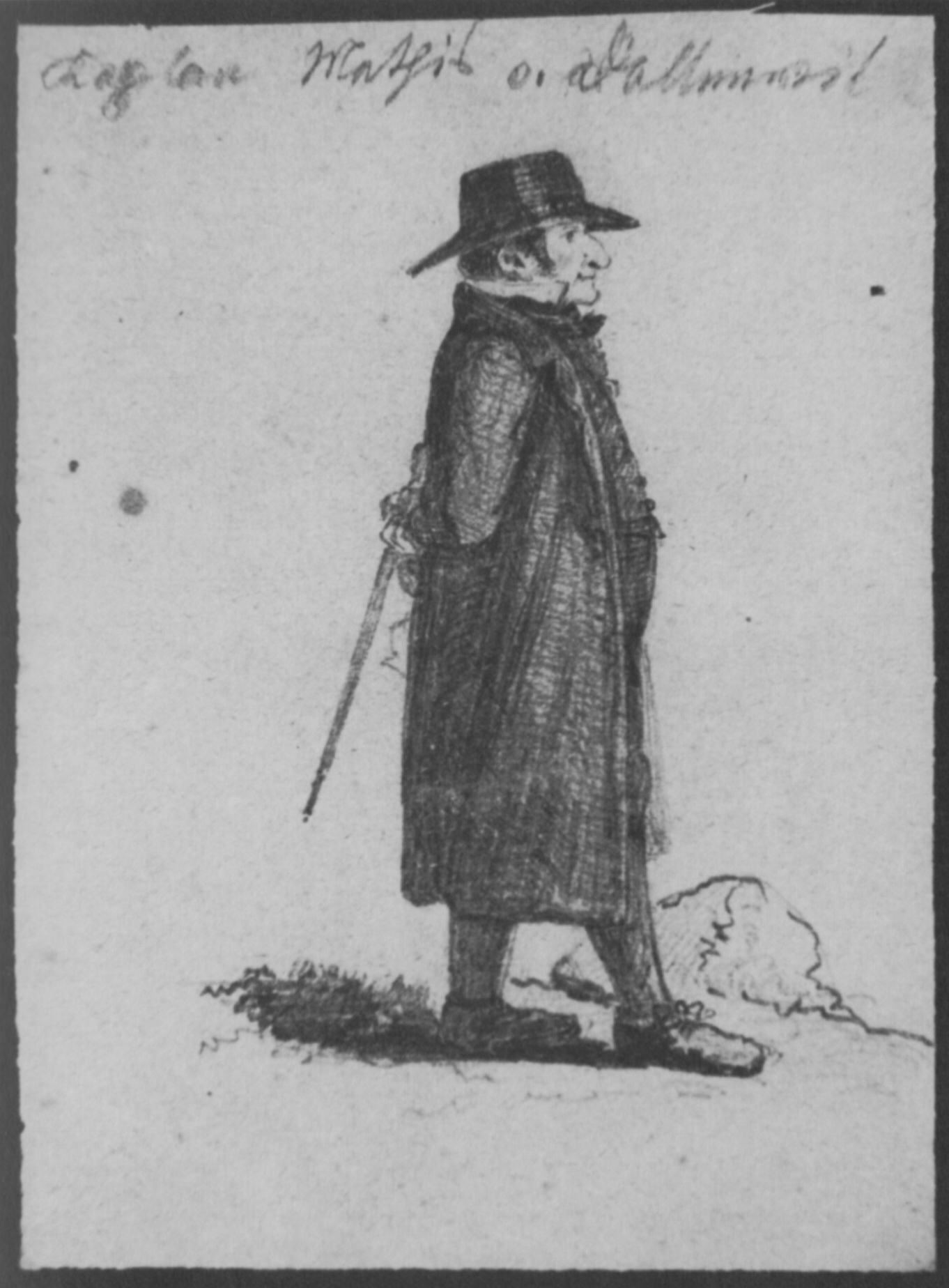
Jakob Joseph Matthys as chaplain in Dallenwil (pencil drawing by unknown hand)

In autumn 1845 Matthys nevertheless found a new position as chaplain in Dallenwil (or "Thalwyl," as Matthys himself wrote the place name). The community, which lies partly in the valley bottom and closer to the cantonal capital Stans, had 730 inhabitants at that time, which is why he was in greater demand than in the remote Maria-Rickenbach. He also successfully campaigned for the village school and was able to bring a sister from Menzing to Dallenwil as a teacher, "so that boys and girls now have the same kind of school." During this time he also showed himself again more in public and officiated from 1851 to 1853 as secretary of the cantonal priest chapter.

Towards the end of this period Matthys wrote a huge Nidwalden dictionary and a detailed Nidwalden grammar for the Schweizerische Idiotikon within a very short time (for more details see below). The correspondence with the Zurich Friedrich Staub, the founder of the Idiotikon, and the interest that the latter showed him, awakened in him once again all his strength to complete the dictionary and the grammar in spite of his illness: "Death throbbed ever more fiercely; it was as if the Grim Reaper and the Idiotikon were competing with each other. But the Idiotikon won it."

Matthys' health continued to decline. In 1864 he traveled once again to Baden in Aargau for a cure, but had to break it off after ten days because of stomach bleeding and exhaustion. A short time later he resigned as chaplain; he spent his last year and a half in the newly built cantonal hospital in Stans. He was buried in his home parish of Wolfenschiessen. On the plaque attached to his grave cross were the first two stanzas of a poem written by Matthys' brother Benedikt - then pastor in Hergiswil:

«Nach Gottes Wille hast du ihn getrunken

Den bittern Leidenskelch, der dir gebracht!

Nach Jesu Beispiel, tief in Lieb’ versunken,

Riefst neigend sanft dein Haupt: ‚Es ist vollbracht!‘

Heil dir, wenn auch die Welt dich einst missachtet,

Wenngleich sie deine Wissenschaft verkannt;

Was Menschen oft verschmähn, ist dort geachtet,

Im Himmel wird dein Streben anerkannt!»

=== Political-religious attitude ===
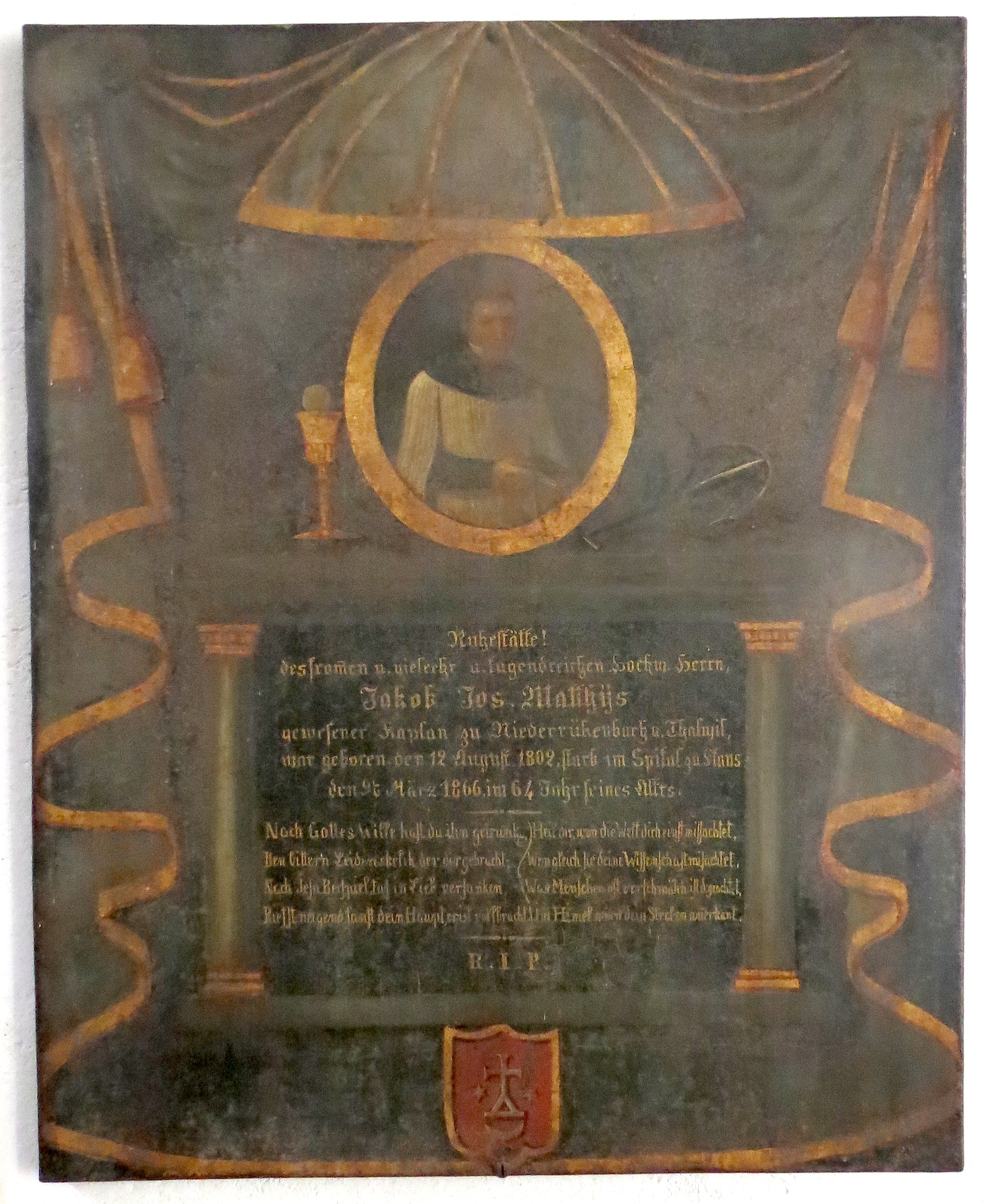
Inscription for Matthys, formerly attached to the grave cross and now in the Wolfenschiesser ossuary

As a chaplain in alpine and rural Nidwalden in the 19th century, Matthys was fundamentally conservative. In 1835 he fought against a new schoolbook in which Jesus was stylized as a role model for the pupils - he had been diligent, had listened well to the teachers, had asked inquisitive questions and had become wiser every day. This implicit relativization of the dogma of Jesus' divinity led to a dispute that shook all of Nidwalden until Matthys, together with his comrades-in-arms, achieved the withdrawal of the teaching material. As one can read from his autobiography, he possibly wanted to endear himself to the clergy with his efforts in order to finally get away from Maria-Rickenbach and obtain a proper pastorate. However, the controversy left a poisoned atmosphere: a pastor and a teacher who had been committed to the new book died a short time later, which was interpreted as the result of the "slander and backstabbing" that they had "not been able to cope with." Matthys, for his part, largely withdrew from the public eye for a long time.

Matthys, however, was not unilaterally conservative. His biographer Iso Baumer states for the time in the place of pilgrimage Maria-Rickenbach a great skepticism towards answers to prayer. In Dallenwil he fought for the strict observance of the school compulsory, as it was required by the cantonal school law of 1851. He complained to former Landammann Clemens Zelger that there was no authority in Nidwalden where he, as a religious teacher and school president, could find "effective help" so that daily school attendance could also be enforced.

In the autobiography, one reads explicitly of his permanent dichotomy in § 34:

Nidwalden German version:

«I ha n ai gseh, das di eint Partij vom Bischof und vo der Staatszijtig griemd wird, die ander vom Eidgnoß und vo der nijwe Zircherzijtig und derglijche. Der einte Partij ha-n-i i de Grundsätze mieße bijstimme, aber i hätt-s nid mit allem ihrem Tue und Trijbe ha derffe; zur andere Partij ha-n-i i de Grundsätze nid bijstimme chenne, nur hie und da i eppis wohl, wil uberall aj eppis Guets ist.»

Standard German version:

„Ich habe auch gesehen, daß die eine Partei vom Bischofe und von der Stadtzeitung [!] gerühmt wird, die andere vom Eidgenossen und von der neuen Zürcherzeitung und dergleichen. Der einen Partei habe ich in den Grundsätzen beistimmen müssen, aber ich hätte es nicht mit allem Ihrem Thun und Treiben halten dürfen; zur anderen Partei habe ich in den Grundsätzen nicht beistimmen können, nur hie und da in etwas doch, weil überall auch etwas gutes ist.“

== Create ==
=== The dialectologist: the Nidwalden dictionary and the Nidwalden grammar ===
In 1862, it was decided in Zurich to compile a new dictionary of recent and historical Swiss German - the Schweizerischen Idiotikons. The driving force behind the project, Friedrich Staub, supported by the select committee of the "Verein für das Schweizerdeutsche Wörterbuch" (Association for the Swiss German Dictionary), sent out an appeal that same year asking all interested parties to collaborate on this work. The appeal also reached Matthys and once again awakened all the forces in the old, seriously ill man. Incidentally, he had already been in contact with one of the members of the select committee, the philologist Heinrich Schweizer-Sidler, when he had sent him his translation of Parrat's world auxiliary language La langue simplifiée (see below). Matthys was also in contact with the philologist Heinrich Schweizer-Sidler.

On 12 September 1862 he wrote Staub a first letter, in January 1863 he already presented him with a large project: First he wanted to make an "almost simple Vocabolarium of our dialect" (of which he already had a sketch), in a second step he wanted to expand the "Vocabularium" as well as compile the idioms, old words and place names, In a second step, he wanted to expand the "Vocabularium" and compile the idioms, old words and place names, to incorporate the collection of words of his compatriot Karl von Deschwanden and to write a grammar, and last but not least, he would contact the Abbot of Engelberg, so that he could have the dialect of the monastery village Engelberg recorded, and Johann Ming should record the deviations in Obwalden. In another, almost simultaneous letter, he already sent a first list of about 2500 words. At the end of 1863 or beginning of 1864 he sent the last booklets to Zurich, so that in the end a dictionary with 611 densely written folio pages was produced. In 1864 followed a dialect grammar written on 89 quarto pages, and he also translated some poems from the little book Großätti aus dem Leberberg by Franz Josef Schild from Solothurn into his Nidwaldnerdeutsch.

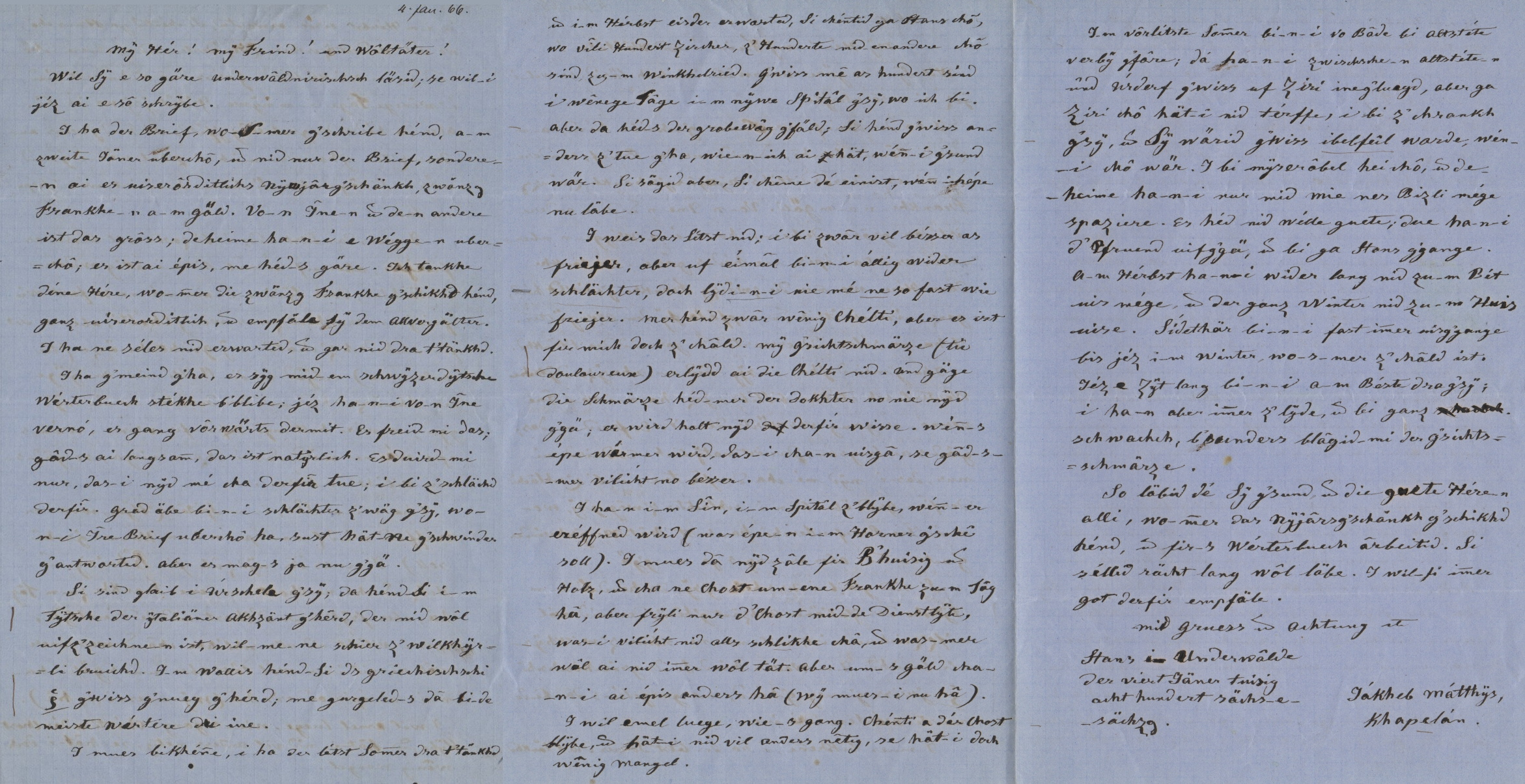
Matthys' last letter to Friedrich Staub, written in Nidwalden German, dated 4 January 1866 (Archive of the Schweizerischen Idiotikons)

Staub sent him fifty francs and a bottle of wine - the amount of money corresponded to a chaplain's salary for 25 regular or 50 sick days. Later Staub also invited him to his home in Zurich, but the visit did not materialize. But even as a bedridden patient in the Stans cantonal hospital, Matthys discussed dialectological questions with his Zurich colleague, and Staub sent him another twenty francs on New Year's Day 1866 - which financed the same number of days in the hospital. In the last letter, which he wrote on 4 January 1866, Matthys describes his course of illness in Nidwalden German, but also muses about the dialects:

«Si sind glaib i Úrschele g’sÿ; da hénd Si i-m Tÿtsche der ÿtaliäner Akhzänt g’hérd, der nid wôl uifz’zeichne-n ist, wil-me-ne schier z’wilkhÿrli bruichd. I-m Wallis hénd-Si ds griechischschi ῥ g’wiss g’nueg g’hérd; me gurgeled-s dâ bi-de meiste Wértere dri ine.» „Sie waren, glaube ich, im Urserental; da haben Sie im Deutschen den italienischen Akzent gehört, den man nicht gut aufzeichnen kann, weil man ihn beinahe zu beliebig braucht. Im Wallis haben Sie das griechische ῥ sicher im Überfluss gehört; man gurgelt es da in den meisten Wörtern.“

Friedrich Staub was able to give Matthys the recognition that Matthys had missed so much during his life, and without this encouragement the dictionary and the grammar would not have come into being. Staub was aware of what he had in Matthys and was able to raise his battered self-confidence. To stimulate his cooperation, he lent him Franz Joseph Stalder's Idiotikon (a dictionary from 1806/1812) and its Dialektologie (a grammar published in 1819) as well as Titus Tobler's Appenzellische Sprachschatz (1837). In the 1868 account of the Schweizerischen Idiotikons, he paid detailed tribute to Matthys the man and the lexicologist:

"One must have read this exemplary work with one's own eyes to get an idea of the mobility and richness of the dialects, but also to convince oneself immediately by the author's keen senses, which do not miss even the smallest detail over which we ordinary people trample thoughtlessly, that we have a born grammarian before us. [...] The grammatical tik was in every fiber of the man. [...] The work has also turned out grand enough in plan and execution [he had wanted to add the Engelberg and Obwaldner dialects to it]; it aims at nothing less than the representation of the Nidwaldner dialect in the totality of its current existence and is therefore not limited to the specialties and curiosities of the same.

Supported by the Idiotikon editor of the time, Rudolf Trüb, Matthys' biographer Iso Baumer subjected the dictionary and the grammar to a closer examination. Despite certain limitations - Matthys was enormously pedantic as far as prefixes and suffixes were concerned, and subsequently also listed words (derivations and compounds) that were simply constructed - he found that the dictionary "accommodated a vast amount of the most valuable information". This was not a bare list of words: On the one hand, Matthys listed the various nuances of meaning with great flair and precision, and on the other, he placed them in a larger semantic, factual, and grammatical context by means of comments; indeed, even phonetic and sociological remarks are not lacking.

In his review of Iso Baumer's biography, the Germanist Walter Haas also dealt with the Nidwalden grammar in more detail and emphasizes the analytical penetration of the material. Characteristics are, first, the purely synchronic presentation, second, the astonishingly exact phonetic dialectal spelling, third, the detailed treatment of even the "self-evident," which tended to result in a complete description of the language system, and fourth, the tendency to formulate as much as possible as a rule, which was reflected in extraordinarily precise observations of, for example, morphonological alternations or the order of enclitic pronouns." These four points are in direct consequence of Matthys' excessive language learning in earlier times (see below). Due to his ability to abstract rules, Matthys achieved "masterpieces" such as his classification of nouns according to plural formation - a stringent classification that Jost Winteler, considered the founder of scientific place grammar writing, only dared to suggest in 1875. According to Haas, such a radically synchronic approach was not fully implemented again until Albert Weber's pioneering Zürichdeutscher Grammatik of 1948. Admittedly, the drive for completeness also led to entries that hardly corresponded to spoken reality. Thus, genitives of numerals such as eisis 'one' and bêdsis 'both' are "doubtful," and both the future exactum - described by Matthys himself as "not popular" - (for example, of the "Particial tense word": i wird g'lobt g'sy sy "I will have been praised" [! ]) as well as the present participle of sy ‚sein‘ – sîjiid, e Sîjede 'being, a being' relegates Matthys himself to the realm of the theoretical. All in all, Haas estimates the importance of this first dialect grammar so highly that he calls for an annotated scholarly edition - supplemented by the epistolary addenda and explanatory notes addressed to Friedrich Staub.

=== The polyglot: the autobiography ===
Matthys divided his two-column autobiography into 34 chapters. In the left column he wrote each chapter in a different language (the last one in his native dialect), and in the right column the same text was written again in High German.

§ 1 - Hungarian	§ 12 - Ancient Greek	§ 24 - Vallader dialect
§ 2 - Polish	§ 13 - Modern Greek	§ 25 - Sursilvan
§ 3 - Upper Sorbian	§ 14 - Latin	§ 26 - Spanish
§ 4 - Russian	§ 15 - French	§ 27 - Portuguese
§ 5 - Slovene (Lower Styria)	§ 16 - Italian	§ 28 - Occitan
§ 6 - Slovene (Carniola)	§ 17 - Hebrew	§ 29 - Old French
§ 7 - Czech	§ 18 - Geʽez	§ 30 - Dutch
§ 8 - Chinese	§ 19 - Aramaic	§ 31 - Swedish
§ 9 - Persian	§ 20 - Mishnaic Hebrew	§ 32 - Danish
§ 10 - Sanskrit	§ 21 - Syriac	§ 33 - English
§ 11 - Malay	§ 22 - Arabic	§ 34 - Highest Alemannic German
	§ 23 - Maghrebi Arabic	

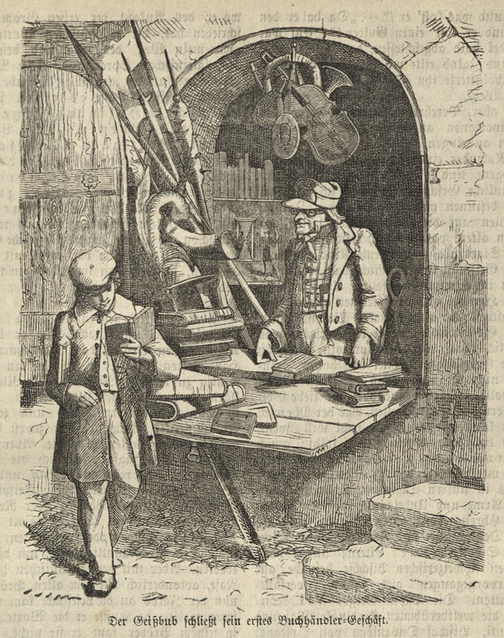
"The goat boy closes his first bookseller's store" - young Matthys buys his first Latin textbooks (illustration in the St. Ursenkalender 1872)

What we know about Matthys's language learning owes much to a letter addressed in 1843 to the Nidwalden physician and politician Clemens Zelger, which the latter forwarded to the Bernese orientalist, Greek scholar, and librarian Ludwig von Sinner, and which was printed in the Berner Bund of 13 July 1854; one thing and another is also known from the autobiography and from the obituary published in the Obwaldner Zeitung. He learned Latin as a youth and French in Stans (see above), Greek in Solothurn, from Fribourg the young student sent a thank-you and New Year's card to his patron in Nidwalden, which was now written in Italian in addition to German, Latin and French, and finally Hebrew in Lucerne. However, he acquired a large part of the languages during those fourteen years when he was in Maria-Rickenbach, "as if in a deserted wasteland without anything to do," as he wrote to Zelger. Finally, in 1844, he wrote his autobiography in 33 foreign languages as well as in Nidwalden German and High German. Three other languages, which he mentioned in a letter to Landmajor Clemens Christen in 1843, he seems to have learned only rudimentarily. In Dallenwil, however, he hardly learned any new languages - with the exception of Hindustani and the Langue simplifiée (on the latter, see below). All in all, he taught himself 38 languages to varying degrees.

Matthys' aids were grammars, dictionaries, and reading texts. He bought many things himself; Arabic and Hebrew teaching aids were given to him by Ludwig von Sinner. For some languages, however, he had "hardly any grammar and only a few reading pieces without a dictionary," as he told Zelger. If he had only texts of a language, he compiled a grammar from them himself. Spanish he learned by comparing the German, Latin, and Spanish versions of the book Die Nachfolge Christi. For English and Old Occitan, he wrote actual linguistic grammars, the English 276 pages strong.

The biographer Iso Baumer presented the 33 foreign-language chapters to various experts with the request to assess their quality. Those in Persian, ancient Greek, Latin, ancient French, Syriac, ancient Ethiopian, Russian, and Czech did well. Matthys' Old Occitan, Lower Engadine (Vallader), Dutch, Swedish, Danish, Polish, Upper Sorbian, Slovenian, Old Hebrew, Biblical Aramaic (Chaldean), and Hungarian were judged to be fairly good. Texts in Sanskrit, Modern Greek, Italian, Spanish, Portuguese, French, English, Middle Hebrew, and Maghrebi Arabic proved to be more poor than adequate, but still comprehensible. Without an adjacent German translation, Arabic, Chinese and Malay were hardly understandable. All non-Latin scripts can be read well, only the Chinese characters are rather clumsy. Several experts said that one could tell that the author was thinking from German (in the case of Hebrew, from Latin), and several thought they could sense that Matthys had archaic Bible translations available for reading. Sometimes he was quite original: since "Alp" and "Alphütte" were apparently missing from his Polish dictionary, he replaced the two German words with the Polish terms for "Riesengebirge" and "Riesengebirgshütte," and he had also been humorously creative in Hebrew.

Matthys himself was quite realistic about his language skills. He concluded his letter to Clemens Zelger with these two paragraphs:

"So my polyglot knowledge can only be fragments, and further is impossible. There can be no question of speaking in foreign languages, since I have never even heard an English word spoken. I now think you will excuse me to your friend [Ludwig von Sinner], and persuade him not to consider me a philologist, which would not have been possible in my circumstances, and could no longer become possible. In other circumstances, however, I would have become a philologist."

=== Collaboration with Henri-Joseph-François Parrat: La langue simplifiée ===
Matthys also helped with the world auxiliary language La langue simplifiée or Stoechiophonie, designed by Pruntrut professor Henri-Joseph-François Parrat and first published in 1858. The simplified language is built on syllables: There are 150 main roots with a long vowel and 100 secondary roots with a short vowel. From these 250 basic elements the whole vocabulary and grammar can be composed. The basic elements are borrowed from the oldest languages, especially Sanskrit; the grammar is Indo-European. The language system, according to which the composition of basic elements leads to a whole, is logical, but in fact it appeals only to educated people.

Matthys learned the language and made contact with its creator (this had already been established by Ludwig von Sinner in 1854/1855). According to P. Rolli, Matthys was a "valuable collaborator" of Parrat. In fact, he translated Parrat's booklet into German, expanded it, improved it from a didactic point of view, and wrote a preface in which he explained the language. All these optimizations of the German version, which appeared in Solothurn in 1861, were also carried over into the new French edition of the same year, as Matthys wrote in a letter to the Zurich philologist Heinrich Schweizer-Sidler.

== Reception ==
"Mathis died unknown in his 64th year," was the obituary that appeared in the Neue Zürcher Zeitung in 1866. The obituary in the Schwyzer-Zeitung focused on the Nidwaldner Wörterbuch and regretted that it would hardly ever be printed, even if it "can be utilized to such an extent that the gradually forming Gesammtwörterbuch für die Schweiz [i.e., the Swiss Idiotikon] will incorporate individual torn fragments of Mathis's work. The biographies that Joseph Ignaz von Ah published (presumably) in 1866 in the Obwaldner Zeitung (61) and (certainly) in 1872 in the St. Ursalender. Ursenkalender in 1872, transformed the unhappy life of the chaplain into an appeal for more to be done for the school system and education in rural Catholic conservative original Switzerland: "Ceterum autem dico - above all, then, once again, and again it is said with all seriousness, - above all, good schools, capable educational institutions, always forward and never backward with the education of the youth! It was said in the Obwaldner Zeitung. "It is not the story of a great prince or a great lord [...] it is only the story of a poor chaplain from dark Unterwalden", was written in the St. Ursenkalender, and in the latter followed at the end an educational appeal: "Don't put the calendar away now, you young people, and start to play and to play. Think about it and say to yourselves: whatever I become, I want to become something right and one day be and remain a whole man."

In 1871, Eduard Osenbrüggen, a professor of law from northern Germany who worked in Zurich, was able to obtain biographical information about Matthys from the pastor of Kerns and described him in his itinerant studies in a basically favorable but also critical way: "Leafing through this mosaic work must arouse pity for the man who, hamster-like, stored up so many languages without thereby benefiting science and the world," but he also learned that Matthys had "put a very large amount of material for the Swiss Idiotikon at the disposal of the editors in Zurich." In 1884, an article by an anonymous author appeared in Hermes, quoting widely from Matthys' autobiography and concluding: "Mathys has achieved almost superhuman things, but for science nothing has fallen off, nothing could fall off. [...S]o one doubly laments the fate of the isolated, starving Caplan, against whom even the forces of nature seem to have allied, and who nevertheless fought and struggled so bravely - an intellectual Robinson Crusoe." Matthys' extensive knowledge of language was generally the focus of memory; thus an essay published in 1933 in the Neue Zürcher Zeitung by Franz Odermatt - which offered nothing new in terms of content - was titled Der nidwaldnerische Mezzofanti, in allusion to the linguistic genius Giuseppe Mezzofanti. Iso Baumer, whose biography was published in 1985, describes Matthys the man and his work quite critically in a concluding review, but then says conciliatory: "But it is precisely in his human mediocrity, which nevertheless allowed him to achieve great things, that he deserves our respect." Baumer's biography was published in 1985.

Linguists saw Matthys in a different light. From Friedrich Staub's obituary written in 1868, in which he paid impressive tribute to Matthys' dialectological achievement, has already been quoted above. Esther Odermatt, in her dissertation on the Nidwaldnerdeutsche diminutives printed in 1903, stated that Matthys' dictionary had formed the basis of her data, "since I owe him many things that I might otherwise have missed." She concluded the section by saying that the dictionary was "a worthy monument to the simple heroism of his life." Matthys' most significant impact, however, is felt in the Schweizerischen Idiotikon, the dictionary of the Swiss German language: "Whoever," as editor Otto Gröger wrote in 1933, "almost daily finds himself in the position of consulting the material compiled and sifted by Mathis in his Nidwaldner Idiotikon, grows to appreciate the modest figure of the Dallenwil chaplain". Finally, in 1987, the Germanist Walter Haas was bothered by the fact that the "polyglot" Matthys was "overemphasized" in the memory:

"No, he was not primarily a polyglot, but a linguist; the systematic about languages attracted the depressive, and this drove him and at the same time enabled him to learn many an idiom whose grammar he had to work out for himself from meager texts."

Haas particularly emphasized the quality of Matthys's dialect grammar, paying tribute to its importance in the history of science, and concluding:

"What Matthys lacked to become a 'scholar' was not 'the necessary critical circumspection' [as the biographer Iso Baumer thought], but education [what Matthys himself stated to Ludwig von Sinner; see above]. Only for this reason was he forced to live out his 'grammatical tik' [Friedrich Staub] in that monstrous biography instead of in recognized paths. But when Staub pointed him to a goal, it showed what he had become capable of through inclination and analytical experience."

== Estate ==
Matthys' library was dissolved after his death. However, his biographer Iso Baumer found in an antiquarian bookshop in Stans the Glossarium arabico-latinum by Jacobus Scheidius, Leiden 1769, which is full of handwritten additions and "had undoubtedly been used by Matthys." This as well as his autobiography and his English linguistics are today kept in the Cantonal Library of Nidwalden in Stans, his Nidwalden dictionary and his Nidwalden grammar in the library of the Swiss Idiotikon in Zurich. In addition, some of his letters still survive, essentially those to Ludwig von Sinner (1854/55, in the Burgerbibliothek of Berne) and to Friedrich Staub (1862-1866, in the Archives of the Schweizerischen Idiotikons in Zurich).

== Works ==
- Der fromme Wallfahrter nach Maria-Rickenbach im Kanton Unterwalden nid dem Wald, zum Gebrauche für jeden Freund Mariens. 2., umgearbeitete Auflage. Räber, Luzern 1835.
- Selbstbiographie des H. Caplans Jakob Mathys [Titel in der Handschrift von Matthys’ Nachfolger in Dallenwil, Franz Josef Joller] beziehungsweise Was that ich und wie gings mir? 41 Jahre lang. 1844 [vom Autor selbst geschriebener Titel]. Manuskript in der Kantonsbibliothek Nidwalden in Stans; abgedruckt in Iso Baumer (1985), pp. 141–219.
- Stoechiophonie oder vereinfachte Sprache von H. J. F. Parrat, ehemaligen [sic] Professor. Solothurn 1861. [Von Matthys aus dem Französischen übersetzt, verbessert und mit einem Vorwort versehen.]
- Idioticon [Nidwaldner Wörterbuch]. Manuskript von 1863/64 in der Bibliothek des Schweizerischen Idiotikons in Zürich.
- Kleine Grammatik des Nidwaldner-Dialektes. Manuskript von 1864, zusammen mit an Friedrich Staub gerichteten brieflichen Nachträgen in der Bibliothek des Schweizerischen Idiotikons in Zürich; ohne Nachträge abgedruckt in Iso Baumer (1985), pp. 221–282.
- Englische Sprachlehre oder Anleitung, die deutschen Redeverhältnisse ins Englische zu übersetzen. Undatiertes Manuskript in der Kantonsbibliothek Nidwalden in Stans.

Also:

- Jakob Joseph Matthys: Eine Autobiographie. In: Der Bund vom 13. Juli 1854, Beilage Nr. 191, pp. 767 f. – Unter dem Titel Merkwürdige Selbstbiographie erneut in: Kirchenzeitung für die katholische Schweiz 7 (1854), pp. 226–228. (This is a letter from Matthys to Clemens Zelger for the attention of Ludwig von Sinner, which the latter passed on to the Federation for publication).

== Bibliography ==
Modern secondary bibliography

- Iso Baumer: Jakob Joseph Matthys. Priester – Sprachenkenner – Dialektologe. Verlag Historischer Verein Nidwalden, Stans 1985 (Beiträge zur Geschichte Nidwaldens, Heft 42) (Digitalisat).
- Iso Baumer: Wissenschaftliche und menschliche Bereicherung: Kaplan Jakob Joseph Matthys (1802–1866) und das Schweizerische Idiotikon. Referat, gehalten an der Mitgliederversammlung des Vereins für das Schweizerdeutsche Wörterbuch am 26. Juni 1986. Manuskript im Archiv des Schweizerischen Idiotikons.
- Walter Haas: [Besprechung von Iso Baumers Biographie.] In: Zeitschrift für Dialektologie und Linguistik 44, 1987, pp. 408–410 (mehr ein eigener Beitrag als eine Rezension).

Encyclopedias

- Robert Durrer: Matthys, Jakob Josef. In: Historisch-Biographisches Lexikon der Schweiz, Band V, S. 52.
- Iso Baumer: Matthys, Jakob Joseph. In: Historisches Lexikon der Schweiz., Band VIII, pp. 376 f. (Die etwas eigenartige Angabe, das Wörterbuch werde noch heute benutzt, soll ausdrücken, dass es immer noch als Quelle des Schweizerischen Idiotikons dient.)

Obituaries and older tributes

- [Obituary, without author:] Neue Zürcher Zeitung, 15. März 1866, p. 336.
- [Obituary, without author:] Schwyzer-Zeitung, 16. März 1866, p. 2.
- [Joseph Ignaz von Ah?:] Kaplan Jakob Matthys. In: Obwaldner Zeitung, Nr. 22 vom 17. März 1866, Titelblatt und p. 86 (Jahrgang durchpaginiert). – Mit dem Vermerk: Keine Dichtung, sondern Wahrheit; theils aus einer hinterlassenen Selbstbiographie, theils aus den mündlichen Erzählungen des Erewigten.
- Friedrich Staub: Rechenschaftsbericht des Schweizerischen Idiotikons an die Mitarbeiter, abgestattet von der Central-Commission im Herbst 1868. [Zürich 1868], pp. 42–45 (Digitalisat).
- [Joseph Ignaz von Ah:] Von einem Kaplan im Unterwaldnerlande und wie viele Sprachen er erlernt und wie er es dazu gebracht hat. Eine kurzweilige Geschichte, aus der man auch noch etwas Anderes lernen kann, als nur fremde Wörter und Sprachen. In: St. Ursenkalender, Jahrgang 1872. Hrsg. vom Verein zur Verbreitung guter Bücher. Schwendimann, Solothurn 1872, pp. 17–26.
- Eduard Osenbrüggen: Wanderstudien aus der Schweiz. 3. Band, Neue Folge. Schaffhausen 1871, pp. 120–126.
- [without author:] Ein geistiger Robinson. In: Hermes. Organ des Vereins junger Kaufleute Luzern, 2. Jahrgang, 1884, No. 6, pp. 45–48. – [Derselbe:] Noch einmal der «geistige Robinson». In: Hermes. Organ des Vereins junger Kaufleute Luzern, 2. Jahrgang, 1884, No. 8, pp. 63 f.Esther Odermatt: Die Deminution in der Nidwaldner Mundart. Diss. Univ. Zürich. Zürich 1903 (über Matthys pp. 2 f.).
- Esther Odermatt: Die Deminution in der Nidwaldner Mundart. Diss. Univ. Zürich. Zürich 1903 (über Matthys pp. 2 f.).
- Franz Odermatt: Der nidwaldnerische Mezzofanti. In: Neue Zürcher Zeitung, Nr. 822 vom 7. Mai 1933, Literarische Beilage, Blatt 4. Mit einem Nachtrag ebenda von Otto Gröger.
