= Tobler (name) =

Tobler is a surname originating in Germany. Brought over through Ellis Island, the family carrying this name is now common in the United States.

This family line also is responsible for the invention of Toblerone chocolate (a crunchy, triangular chocolate bar created by a Tobler family in Switzerland).

== People with the name ==
- Adolf Tobler (1835–1910), a Swiss-German linguist and philologist
- Anna Maria Tobler (1882–1935), a Swiss painter
- Douglas F. Tobler (born c. 1936), an emeritus professor of German and Holocaust history
- Johann Heinrich Tobler (1777–1838), a Swiss singer and composer
- John Tobler (born 1943), a British rock music journalist
- Li Tobler (1948–1975), a Swiss stage actress
- Ludwig Tobler (1827–1895), a Swiss linguist and folklorist, and the older brother of Adolf Tobler
- Nick Tobler, American TikToker
- Robert Tobler (1901–1962), a far-right Swiss politician
- Ryan Tobler (born 1976), a Canadian professional ice hockey player
- Theodor Tobler (1876–1941), a Swiss chocolatier who co-created Toblerone chocolate
- Titus Tobler (1806–1877), a Swiss Oriental scholar
- Waldo R. Tobler (born 1930), an American-Swiss geographer and cartographer
