= Ludwig Tobler =

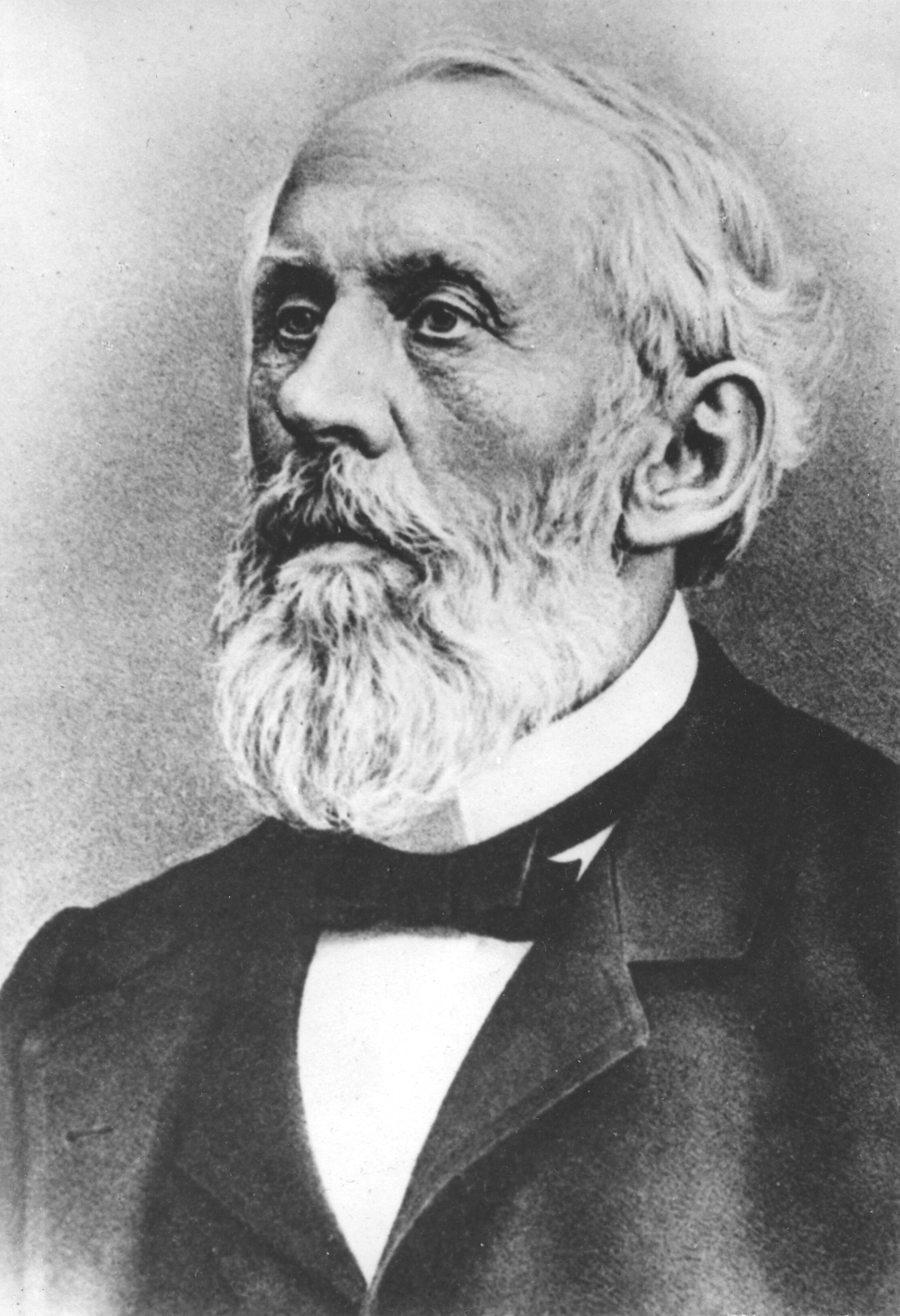
- Ludwig Tobler
- Born: Johann Ludwig Tobler; 1 June 1827; Hirzel, Zürich, Switzerland
- Died: 19 August 1895 (aged 68); Zürich, Switzerland
- Relatives: Adolf Tobler (brother)

Johann Ludwig Tobler (1 June 1827 – 19 August 1895) was a Swiss philologist and folklorist. Born in Hirzel in Zürich, Switzerland, he was an older brother of philologist Adolf Tobler (1835–1910). Ludwig Tobler died in Zürich.

He studied theology, philosophy and philology at the universities of Zürich and Leipzig, receiving his doctorate at the latter institution in 1851. In 1864 he obtained his habilitation from the University of Bern and in 1866 became an associate professor of linguistics and German philology. In 1873 he returned to the University of Zürich, where in 1893 he was named a full professor of German language and literature.

== Published works ==
In 1881, with Friedrich Staub, he began publication of the Schweizerisches Idiotikon ("Swiss idioticon"; a dictionary of the Swiss-German language).

The following are some of his other written efforts:

- Über die Wortzusammensetzung nebst einem Anhang über die verstärkenden Zusammensetzungen, 1868 – On word composition.
- Die fremden Wörter in der deutschen Sprache, 1872 – Foreign words in the German language.
- Schweizerische Volkslieder (2 volumes, 1882–84) – Swiss folk songs.
- Ethnographische Gesichtspuncte der schweizerdeutschen Dialektforschung, 1887 – Ethnographic aspects of Swiss-German dialect research.
- Kleine Schriften zur Volks-und Sprachkunde (edited by Albert Bachmann and Jakob Baechtold, 1897) – Smaller writings on folklore and linguistics.
