= Mimesis: The Representation of Reality in Western Literature =

1946 book by Erich Auerbach

Mimesis: The Representation of Reality in Western Literature (German: Mimesis: Dargestellte Wirklichkeit in der abendländischen Literatur) is a book of literary criticism by Erich Auerbach and his best-known work. It was written in German between 1942 and 1945, while Auerbach was teaching in Istanbul, Turkey, where he fled after being ousted from his professorship in Romance Philology at the University of Marburg by the Nazis in 1935. It was first published in Switzerland in 1946 by A. Francke Verlag, with an English translation by Princeton University Press following in 1953, since when it has remained in print.

Mimesis is arranged in twenty sections, in chronological order. Each section analyses one to three works from the particular period, often beginning with a lengthy extract from the work, given in the original language and English translation. Nearly all the passages selected are narratives of some sort (# 12, covering an essay by Michel de Montaigne is one exception). The literary forms covered include epic poetry, novels, plays, memoir, and letters.

The book opens with a comparison between the way the world is represented in Homer’s Odyssey and the way it appears in the biblical Book of Genesis's account of the Sacrifice of Isaac, and ends with analysis of a passage from To the Lighthouse by Virginia Woolf (1927). From his analyses, Auerbach attempts to make the foundation for a unified theory of representation that spans the entire history of Western literature, including even the Modernist novelists writing at the time Auerbach began his study.

== Overview ==
Mimesis gives an account of the way in which everyday life in its seriousness has been represented by many Western writers, from ancient Greek and Roman writers such as Petronius and Tacitus, early Christian writers such as Augustine, Medieval writers such as Chretien de Troyes, Dante, and Boccaccio, Renaissance writers such as Montaigne, Rabelais, Shakespeare, and Cervantes, 17th-century writers such as Molière and Racine, Enlightenment writers such as Voltaire, 19th-century writers such as Stendhal, Balzac, Flaubert, and Zola, and 20th-century writers such as Proust and Woolf. Despite his treatment of the many major works, Auerbach apparently did not think he was comprehensive enough, and apologized in the original publication in 1946 explaining that he had access only to the 'insufficient' resources available in the library at Istanbul University where he worked; Auerbach did not know Turkish and so could not use locally available sources, and did not have access to non-Turkish secondary sources.

The mode of literary criticism in which Mimesis operates is often referred to among contemporary critics as historicism, since Auerbach largely regarded the way reality was represented in the literature of various periods to be intimately bound up with social and intellectual conventions of the time in which they were written. In this he followed Giambattista Vico. Auerbach considered himself a historical perspectivist in the German tradition (he mentioned Hegel in this respect) and interpreted specific features of style, grammar, syntax, and diction to make much broader claims about cultural and historical questions. Of Mimesis, Auerbach wrote that his "purpose is always to write history".

Auerbach is in the same German tradition of philology as Ernst Curtius, Leo Spitzer, and Karl Vossler, having a mastery of many languages and epochs and all-inclusive in its approach, incorporating just about any intellectual endeavor into the discipline of literary criticism. Auerbach was a Romance language specialist, which explains his admitted bias towards treating texts from French compared to other languages.

=== Chapters ===
#	Chapter title	Main works discussed
1	Odysseus' Scar	Odyssey by Homer and Genesis 22
2	Fortunata	Satyricon by Petronius, Annals Book 1 by Tacitus and Mark ch. 14
3	The Arrest of Peter Valvomeres	Res Gestae by Ammianus Marcellinus
4	Sicharius and Chramnesindus	History of the Franks by Gregory of Tours
5	Roland Against Ganelon	Chanson de Roland
6	The Knight Sets Forth	Yvain, the Knight of the Lion by Chrétien de Troyes
7	Adam and Eve	The medieval mystery play Mystère d'Adam; St. Bernard of Clairvaux; St. Francis of Assisi
8	Farinata and Cavalcante	Inferno, The Divine Comedy by Dante Alighieri
9	Frate Alberto	The Decameron by Giovanni Boccaccio
10	Madame Du Chastel	Le Réconfort de Madame du Fresne by Antoine de la Sale
11	The World in Pantagruel's Mouth	Gargantua and Pantagruel by François Rabelais
12	L'Humaine Condition	Essays by Michel de Montaigne
13	The Weary Prince	Henry IV, Parts 1 and 2 by William Shakespeare
14	The Enchanted Dulcinea	Don Quixote by Miguel de Cervantes
15	The Faux Dévot	Tartuffe by Molière and several plays of Racine
16	The Interrupted Supper	Manon Lescaut by Abbé Prévost; Candide by Voltaire; Mémoires by Louis de Rouvroy, duc de Saint-Simon
17	Miller the Musician	Luise Miller by Friedrich Schiller
18	In the Hôtel de la Mole	The Red and the Black by Stendhal, Pere Goriot by Balzac and Madame Bovary by Gustave Flaubert
19	Germinie Lacerteux	Germinie Lacerteux by Edmond and Jules de Goncourt and Germinal by Émile Zola
20	The Brown Stocking	To the Lighthouse by Virginia Woolf and In Search of Lost Time by Marcel Proust

== Position and evaluation of rhetoric ==
To the consternation of his colleague Ernst Curtius, Auerbach's work is marked by an openly anti-rhetorical position. Auerbach criticizes classical writers such as Homer, Tacitus, and Petronius, as well as medieval theologians (except St. Augustine) and writers of the 17th century, like Racine, for their adherence to the rhetorical doctrine of "styles" with their corresponding subject matters: the low style's association with the comedic and the popular classes, and the elevated style's association with the tragic, the historic, and the heroic. Auerbach sees the Bible as opposing this rhetorical doctrine in its serious and poignant portrayals of common folk and their encounter with the divine. As Auerbach notes in Chapter 2 when discussing the New Testament:

But the spirit of rhetoric — a spirit which classified subjects in genera and invested every subject with a specific form of style as one garment becoming it in virtue of its nature [i.e. lower classes with the farcical low-style, upper classes with the tragic, the historic and the sublime elevated-style] — could not extend its dominion to them [the Bible writers] for the simple reason that their subject would not fit into any of the known genres. A scene like Peter's denial fits into no antique genre. It is too serious for comedy, too contemporary and everyday for tragedy, politically too insignificant for history — and the form which was given it is one of such immediacy that its like does not exist in the literature of antiquity.

The Bible will ultimately be responsible for the "mixed style" of Christian rhetoric, a style that is described by Auerbach in Chapter 7 as the "antithetical fusion" or "merging" of the high and low style. The model is Christ's Incarnation as both sublimitas and humilitas. This mixture ultimately leads to a "popular realism" seen in the religious plays and sermons of the 12th century. Auerbach also discusses the development of an intermediate or middle style due to medieval influences from the Bible and courtly love (see chapters 9 and 15 on Boccaccio and Molière). This development of an intermediate and then ultimately another "mixed style" (Shakespeare, Hugo) leads to what Auerbach calls the "modern realism" of the 19th century (see Chapter 18 on Flaubert).

Auerbach champions writers like Gregory of Tours and St. Francis of Assisi, whose Latin was poor and whose rhetorical education was minimal, but who were still able to convey vivid expression and feeling. He also champions the diarist Saint-Simon, who wrote about the late seventeenth and early eighteenth century French court. Completely free of the absolute constraints of style found in Racine or the superficial use of reality found in Prévost or Voltaire, Saint-Simon's portraits of court life are considered by Auerbach, somewhat surprisingly, to be the precursor of Proust (an admirer of Saint-Simon) and Zola.

== Critical reception ==
Mimesis is a sprawling, wide-ranging work. It has been praised for its insights on the particular works it addresses, and for the way the author revels in the complexities of each work and epoch without resorting to reductive generalities. At the same time, it has been criticized for its lack of a single overarching theme or claim. For this reason, individual chapters of the book are often read independently.

Auerbach summarizes his comparison of the texts as follows:

The two styles, in their opposition, represent basic types: on the one hand [The Odyssey's] fully externalized description, uniform illustration, uninterrupted connection, free expression, all events in the foreground, displaying unmistakable meanings, few elements of historical development and of psychological perspective; on the other hand [in the Old Testament], certain parts brought into high relief, others left obscure, abruptness, suggestive influence of the unexpressed, "background" quality, multiplicity of meanings and the need for interpretation, universal-historical claims, development of the concept of the historically becoming, and preoccupation with the problematic.

Auerbach concludes by arguing that the "full development" of these two styles, the rhetorical tradition with its constraints on representing reality and the Biblical or "realist" tradition with its engagement of everyday experience, exercised a "determining influence upon the representation of reality in European literature”.

By far the most frequently reprinted chapter is Chapter 1, "Odysseus' Scar", in which Auerbach compares the scene in book 19 of Homer’s Odyssey, when Odysseus finally returns home from his two decades of warring and journeying, to Genesis 22, the story of The Binding of Isaac. Highlighting the rhetorically determined simplicity of characters in the Odyssey (what he calls the "external") against what he regards as the psychological depth of the figures in the Old Testament, Auerbach suggests that the Old Testament gives a more powerful and historical impression than the Odyssey, which he classifies as closer to "legend" in which all details are fleshed out in a leisurely manner and all actions occur in a simple present – indeed even flashbacks are narrated in the present tense. It is in the context of this comparison between the Biblical and the Homeric that Auerbach draws his famous conclusion that the Bible's claim to truth is "tyrannical", since:

What he [the writer of the Old Testament] produced then, was not primarily oriented towards "realism" (if he succeeded in being realistic, it was merely a means, not an end): it was oriented to truth.

By the time Auerbach treats the work of Flaubert, he has come full circle. Like the Biblical writers whose faith in the so-called "tyrannical" truth of God produces an authentic expression of reality, Flaubert's "faith in the truth of language" (ch. 18) represents "an entire human experience".

== Bibliography ==
- Auerbach, Erich. Mimesis: The Representation of Reality in Western Literature. Fiftieth Anniversary Edition. Trans. Willard Trask. Princeton: Princeton University Press, 2003.
- Bakker, Egbert. "Mimesis as Performance: Rereading Auerbach’s First Chapter." Poetics Today 20.1 (1999): 11–26.
- Baldick, Chris. “Realism.” Oxford Concise Dictionary of Literary Terms. New York: Oxford University Press, 1996. 184.
- Bremmer, Jan. "Erich Auerbach and His Mimesis." Poetics Today 20.1 (1999): 3–10.
- Calin, William. "Erich Auerbach’s Mimesis – ’Tis Fifty Years Since: A Reassessment." Style 33.3 (1999): 463–74.
- Doran, Robert. "Literary History and the Sublime in Erich Auerbach's Mimesis." New Literary History 38.2 (2007): 353–69.
- Green, Geoffrey. "Erich Auerbach." Literary Criticism & the Structures of History: Erich Auerbach & Leo Spitzer. Nebraska: University of Nebraska Press, 1982.
- Holmes, Jonathan, and Streete, Adrian, eds. Refiguring Mimesis: Representation in Early Modern Literature. Hatfield: University of Hertfordshire Press, 2005.
- Holquist, Michael. “Erich Auerbach and the Fate of Philology Today.” Poetics Today 20.1 (1999): 77-91.
- Landauer, Carl. "Mimesis and Erich Auerbach’s Self-Mythologizing." German Studies Review 11.1 (1988): 83-96.
- Lerer, Seth. Literary History and the Challenge of Philology: The Legacy of Erich Auerbach. Stanford: Stanford University Press, 1996.
- Nuttall, A. D. "New Impressions V: Auerbach’s Mimesis." Essays in Criticism 54.1 (2004): 60-74.
- Said, Edward W. Introduction to Auerbach, Erich. Mimesis: The Representation of Reality in Western Literature. First Princeton Classic edition. Trans. Willard Trask. ISBN 978-0-691-16022-1. Princeton: Princeton University Press, 2013.
