= Erich Auerbach =

German philologist (1892–1957)

- Born: 9 November 1892; Berlin, German Empire
- Died: 13 October 1957 (aged 64); Wallingford, Connecticut, U.S.
- Occupations: Literary critic, philologist

Education
- Education: University of Greifswald
- Thesis: Zur Technik der Frührenaissancenovelle in Italien und Frankreich (1921)
- Doctoral advisor: Erhard Lommatzsch

Philosophical work
- Institutions: University of Marburg; Istanbul University; Pennsylvania State University; Yale University
- Doctoral students: Fredric Jameson
- Notable works: Mimesis: The Representation of Reality in Western Literature

Erich Auerbach (German: [ˈaʊɐbax]; 9 November 1892 – 13 October 1957) was a German philologist, comparative scholar and critic of literature. His best-known work is Mimesis: The Representation of Reality in Western Literature, a history of representation in Western literature from ancient to modern times frequently cited as a classic in the study of realism in literature. Along with Leo Spitzer, Auerbach is widely recognized as one of the foundational figures of comparative literature.

== Biography ==
Auerbach, who was Jewish and born in Berlin, was trained in the German philological tradition and eventually became, along with Leo Spitzer, one of its best-known scholars. Auerbach earned a doctorate in law at Heidelberg University in 1913. After serving in World War I, he completed a second doctorate, in Romance philology, at the University of Greifswald in 1921. He subsequently worked as a librarian at the Prussian State Library before joining the faculty of the University of Marburg in 1929, publishing a well-received study titled Dante: Poet of the Secular World.

With the rise of National Socialism Auerbach was forced to vacate his position in 1935. Exiled from Nazi Germany, he took up residence in Istanbul, Turkey, where he wrote Mimesis: The Representation of Reality in Western Literature (1946), generally considered his masterwork. He was chair of the faculty for Western languages and literatures at Istanbul University from 1936 to 1947. Auerbach's life and work in Turkey is detailed and placed in historical and sociological context in Kader Konuk's East West Mimesis: Auerbach in Turkey (2010).

Auerbach moved to the United States in 1947, teaching at Pennsylvania State University and then working at the Institute for Advanced Study. He was appointed professor of Romance philology at Yale University in 1950, a position he held until his death in 1957 in Wallingford, Connecticut.

While at Yale, Auerbach was one of Fredric Jameson's teachers.

== Reception ==
In the 50-year commemoration reprinting of Auerbach's Mimesis, Edward Said of Columbia University included an extended introduction to Auerbach and mentioned the book's debt to Giambattista Vico, writing: "As one can immediately judge by its subtitle, Auerbach's book is by far the largest in scope and ambition out of all the other important critical works of the past half century. Its range covers literary masterpieces from Homer and the Old Testament right through to Virginia Woolf and Marcel Proust, although as Auerbach says apologetically at the end of the book, for reasons of space he had to leave out a great deal of medieval literature as well as some crucial modern writers like Pascal and Baudelaire."

== Works ==
- Dante als Dichter der irdischen Welt. Berlin: de Gruyter, 1929.
  - Published in English as Dante: Poet of the Secular World. Trans. Ralph Manheim. Chicago: University of Chicago Press, 1961.
- Mimesis. Dargestellte Wirklichkeit in der abendländischen Literatur. Bern: Franke Verlag, 1946.
  - Published in English as Mimesis: The Representation of Reality in Western Literature. Princeton: Princeton University Press, 1953.
- Introduction aux études de philologie romane. Frankfurt am Main: Klostermann, 1949. The Turkish translation, published in 1944, appeared before the French original.
  - Published in English as Introduction to Romance Languages and Literature: Latin, French, Spanish, Provençal, Italian. Trans. Guy Daniels. New York: Capricorn, 1961.
- Scenes from the Drama of European Literature: Six Essays. New York: Meridian, 1959.
  - Chapters and papers published between 1944 and 1951, one written in English, five translated from German. Includes the 1944 version of "Figura".
- Literatursprache und Publikum in der lateinischen Spätantike und im Mittelalter. Bern: Franke Verlag, 1958.
  - Published in English as Literary Language and Its Public in Late Latin Antiquity and in the Middle Ages. Trans. Ralph Manheim. London: Routledge and Kegan Paul, 1965.
- Time, History, and Literature: Selected Essays of Erich Auerbach. Ed. James I. Porter. Trans. Jane O. Newman. Princeton: Princeton University Press, 2013.

== Bibliography ==
- Bakker, Egbert. "Mimesis as Performance: Rereading Auerbach’s First Chapter." Poetics Today 20.1 (1999): 11–26.
- Baldick, Chris. "Realism." Oxford Concise Dictionary of Literary Terms. New York: Oxford University Press, 1996. 184.
- Bremmer, Jan. "Erich Auerbach and His Mimesis." Poetics Today 20.1 (1999): 3–10.
- Calin, William. "Erich Auerbach’s Mimesis – ’Tis Fifty Years Since: A Reassessment." Style 33.3 (1999): 463–474.
- Chihaia, Matei. 40 Years of Auerbach Research. A bibliography of secondary literature on Erich Auerbach's "Mimesis" since 1984 [Data set]. Zenodo (2025). https://doi.org/10.5281/zenodo.14685309.
- Domínguez, César. "Auerbach y la literatura comparada ante Babel." Cuadernos de teoría y crítica 3 (2017): 137–149.
- Doran, Robert. "Literary History and the Sublime in Erich Auerbach´s Mimesis." New Literary History 38.2 (2007): 353–369.
- Doran, Robert. "Erich Auerbach's Humanism and the Criticism of the Future." Moderna: semestrale di teoria e critica della letteratura 11.1/2 (2009): 31–39.
- Green, Geoffrey. "Erich Auerbach." Literary Criticism & the Structures of History: Erich Auerbach & Leo Spitzer. Nebraska: University of Nebraska Press, 1982.
- Holmes, Jonathan, and Streete, Adrian, eds. Refiguring Mimesis: Representation in Early Modern Literature. Hatfield: University of Hertfordshire Press, 2005.
- Holquist, Michael. "Erich Auerbach and the Fate of Philology Today." Poetics Today 20.1 (1999): 77–91.
- Landauer, Carl. "Mimesis and Erich Auerbach’s Self-Mythologizing." German Studies Review 11.1 (1988): 83–96.
- Lerer, Seth, Literary History and the Challenge of Philology: The Legacy of Erich Auerbach. Stanford: Stanford University Press, 1996.
- Lerer, Seth (2005). "Auerbach, Erich". Johns Hopkins Guide to Literary Theory and Criticism (2 ed.). Johns Hopkins University Press. Archived from the original on 30 October 2005.
- Nuttall, A. D. "New Impressions V: Auerbach’s Mimesis." Essays in Criticism 54.1 (2004): 60–74.
- Porter, James I. "Erich Auerbach and the Judaizing of Philology." Critical Inquiry 35 (2008): 115–47.
- Said, Edward. "Fifty Year Anniversary of Mimesis," included in Fifty Year Anniversary edition of Mimesis. Princeton University Press, 2003.
- Weinstein, David and Zakai, Avihu, Jewish exiles and European thought in the shadow of the Third Reich : Baron, Popper, Strauss, Auerbach. Cambridge, United Kingdom : Cambridge University Press, 2017.
