= Erhard Lommatzsch =

German Romance philologist (1886–1975)

- Born: 2 February 1886; Dresden
- Died: 20 January 1975 (aged 88); Frankfurt am Main
- Children: Wilhelm Lommatzsch

Academic background
- Education: Royal Friedrich Wilhelm University of Berlin
- Thesis: System der Gebärden. Dargestellt auf Grund der mittelalterlichen Literatur Frankreichs (1910)
- Doctoral advisor: Heinrich Morf
- Other advisor: Adolf Tobler

Academic work
- Institutions: Friedrich Wilhelm University of Berlin (1917–1921); University of Greifswald (1921–1928); Goethe University Frankfurt (1928–1956)
- Doctoral students: Erich Auerbach (1921); Elida Maria Szarota (1934)
- Main interests: Old French, Occitan literature, Gautier de Coincy
- Notable works: Altfranzösisches Wörterbuch

Erhard Lommatzsch (2 February 1886 – 20 January 1975) was a German Romance philologist.

== Biography ==
From 1905 to 1910 he studied classical, German and Romance philology at the University of Berlin, where his teachers included Eduard Norden, Gustav Roethe, Erich Schmidt and Adolf Tobler. In 1913 he obtained his habilitation, and in 1917 was named an associate professor at Berlin University. He then held the position of a full professor of Romance philology at the universities of Greifswald (from 1921) and Frankfurt am Main (from 1928 until his retirement in 1954 or 1956 (Note: The winter semester of 1955/1956 is said to have been his last active term.)).

He served as the dean of the Faculty of Philosophy at Frankfurt for a year from 1932 to November 1933, and oversaw the implementation of the 7 April 1933 Law for the Restoration of the Professional Civil Service, which resulted in the dismissal of Max Horkheimer, among others. (Note: The faculty meeting notes of 20 April 1933, which list Horkheimer as "placed on leave", were drawn up and signed by Lommatzsch.) He refused to stand for the office again, insisting that he wished to dedicate himself to scientific matters. During the Nazi period (1933–1945) he published less and while he continued to work on his multi-volume dictionary, he suspended his early interests in Geistesgeschichte and Völkerpsychologie, leaving out the antisemitic tropes in Gautier de Coincy from his 1938 article on the medieval author. His son Wilhelm was killed in combat in February 1945 on the German Oder defence line. Having referred to Nazism in wartime as a "temporary storm", in his early post-war writings Lommatzsch described the World War II's outcome as a "collapse" and its aftermath as "days of darkness".

He was a full member of the Mainz Academy of Sciences, a corresponding member of the Bavarian Academy of Sciences, the Berlin-Brandenburg Academy of Sciences and Humanities (from 1937, external member from 1969) and the German Academy of Sciences at Berlin, an honorary member of the Modern Language Association of America and an associate member of the Académie des Inscriptions et Belles-Lettres.

He was the supervisor of Erich Auerbach's doctoral thesis at Berlin and Greifswald (1921).

== Published works ==
From 1925 he published the Altfranzösisches Wörterbuch, an Old French dictionary based on a massive collection of notes compiled by Adolf Tobler. The dictionary totaled 11 volumes and was nearly completed at the time of Lommatzsch's death in 1975. The dictionary is sometimes referred to as the "Tobler-Lommatzsch". Other published works by Lommatzsch are:

- Gautier de Coincy als Satiriker, 1913 – Gautier de Coincy as satirist.
- Ein Italienisches Novellenbuch des Quattrocento : Giovanni Sabadino degli Arientis "Porrettane", 1913 – An Italian novella book of the Quattrocento: Giovanni Sabadino degli Arienti's Porrettane.
- Provenzalisches liederbuch; lieder der troubadours mit einer auswahl biographischer zeugnisse, nachdichtungen und singweisen, 1917 – Provençal songbook; songs of the troubadours with a selection of biographical references, reflections and songs.
- Geschichten aus dem alten Frankreich, 1947 – Stories from medieval France.
- Kleinere Schriften zur romanischen Philologie, 1948 – Smaller writings on Romance philology.
- Beiträge zur älteren italienischen Volksdichtung; Untersuchungen und Texte, 1950 – Contributions to older Italian folk poetry.
- Leben und Lieder der provenzalischen Troubadours, in Auswahl dargeboten, 1957 – Life and songs of the Provençal troubadours.
- Blumen und Früchte im altfranzösischen Schrifttum, 1966 – Flowers and fruits in old French literature.

== Bibliography ==
- Estelmann, Frank; Müller, Olaf (2008), "Angepaßter Alltag in der Frankfurter Germanistik und Romanistik: Franz Schultz und Erhard Lommatzsch im Nationalsozialismus", in Kobes, Jörn; Hesse, Jan-Otmar (eds.), Frankfurter Wissenschaftler zwischen 1933 und 1945, Göttingen: Wallstein, pp. 33–59, ISBN 9783835302587
