= Heinrich Morf =

Swiss linguist and literary historian

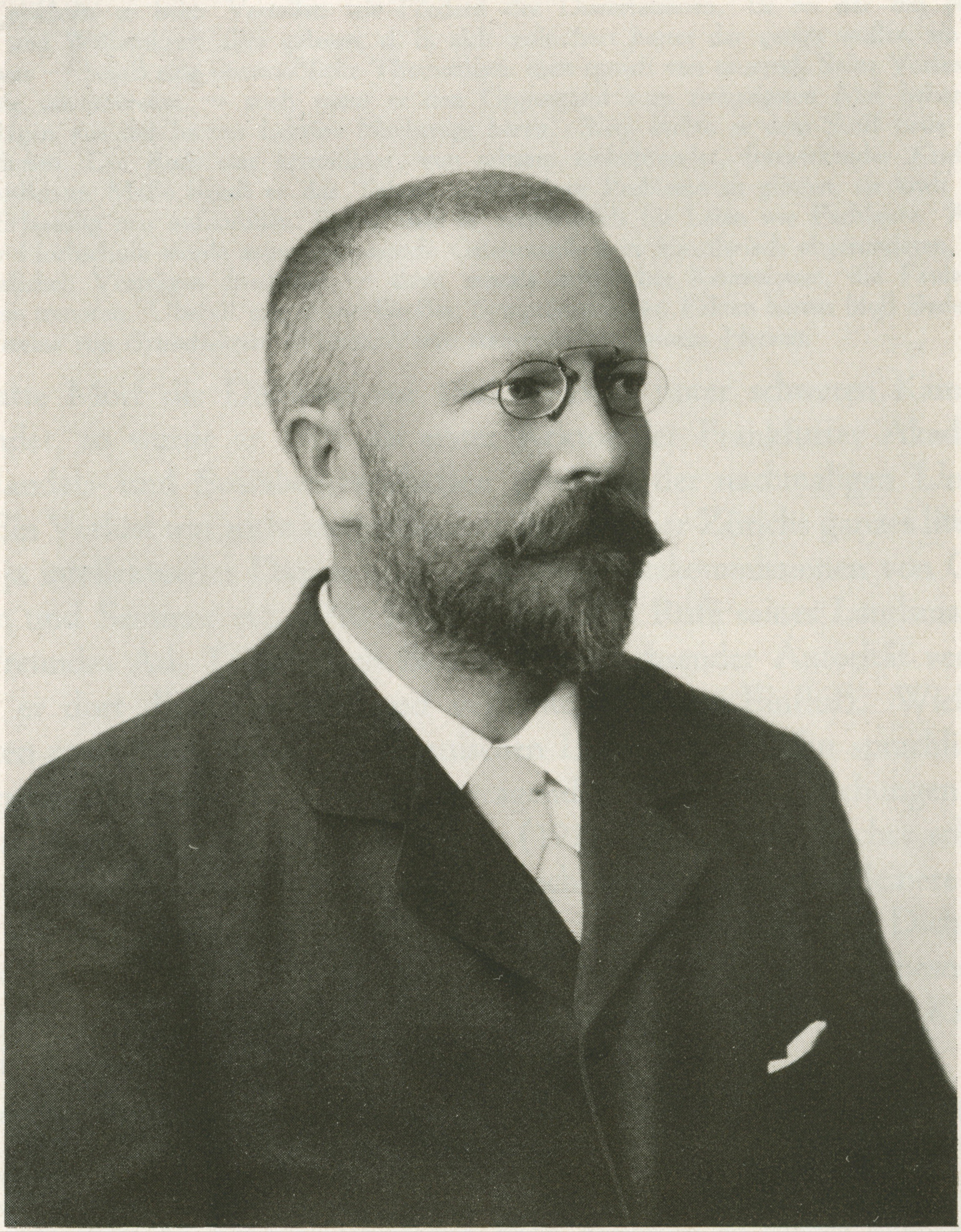
Heinrich Morf

Heinrich Morf (23 October 1854, in Münchenbuchsee – 23 January 1921, in Thun) was a Swiss linguist and literary historian.

He studied Indo-Germanic and classical philology at the University of Zürich (1873–75) and Romance philology at the University of Strasbourg (1875–77), receiving his doctorate in 1877 with the dissertation Die Wortstellung im altfranzösischen Rolandslied. Following graduation, he continued his education in Spain (1877/78) and Paris (1878/79), where he was a student of Gaston Paris. In 1879 he was named an associate professor of Romance philology at the University of Bern. Later on, he served as a professor at the University of Zürich (from 1889; successor to Heinrich Breitinger), the Akademie für Sozial- und Handelswissenschaft in Frankfurt (from 1901; rector in 1901–03) and the University of Berlin (from 1910) as successor to Adolf Tobler.

He was a catalyst towards the creation of the Glossaire des patois de la Suisse romande ("Glossary of the patois of French-speaking Switzerland"), an institution founded by Louis Gauchat and others. In 1914 he was one of the subscribers to the so-called "Manifesto of the Ninety-Three".

== Selected works ==
- Literaturgeschichte des achtzehnten Jahrhunderts (3 parts, 1881–94; original author: Hermann Hettner) – Literary history of the eighteenth century.
- Das studium der romanischen philologie, 1890 – Study of Romance philology.
- Die französische litteratur zur zeit Ludwig's XII, 1895 – French literature in the time of Louis XII.
- Geschichte der neuern Franzoesischen Litteratur, 1898 – History of modern French literature.
- Deutsche und Romanen in der Schweiz, 1901 – German and Romance languages in Switzerland.
- Aus Dichtung und Sprache der Romanen: Vorträge und Skizzen, 1903 – On Romance poetry and language; lectures and sketches.
- Geschichte der französischen Literatur im Zeitalter der Renaissance, 1914 – History of French literature in the age of the Renaissance.
- Auswahl aus den werken des Gregor von Tours, 1922 – Selection from the works of Gregory of Tours.
