= Breitinger =

Breitinger is a German surname. Notable people with the surname include:

- Heinrich Breitinger (1832–1889), Swiss literary historian and philologist
- Hilarius Breitinger (1907–1994), German Franciscan prelate
- Johann Jakob Breitinger (disambiguation), multiple people
