= Jakob Ulrich =

Swiss romanist (1856–1906)

- Born: 23 September 1856; Waltalingen, Switzerland
- Died: 9 May 1906 (aged 49); Zürich, Switzerland

Academic background
- Education: University of Zurich

Academic work
- Discipline: Philology
- Sub-discipline: Romance languages
- Institutions: University of Zurich

Jakob Ulrich (23 September 1856, in Waltalingen – 5 September 1906, in Zürich) was a Swiss Romance philologist.

He studied Indo-European linguistics and Romance philology in Zürich and Paris, where his teachers included Gaston Paris and Paul Meyer. In 1879 he received his doctorate at Zürich under the direction of Heinrich Schweizer-Sidler with the thesis Die formelle Entwicklung des Participium Praeteriti in den romanischen Sprachen. In 1880 he obtained his habilitation for Romance philology at the University of Zürich, where in 1901 he attained a full professorship. After his death, he was succeeded at the university by Louis Gauchat.

== Selected works ==
- Rhätoromanische Chrestomathie, 1882 – Raeto-Romance chrestomathy.
- Rhätoromanische texte, 1883 – Raeto-Romance text.
- Altitalienisches lesebuch, XIII. jahrhundert, zusammengestellt, 1886 – Old Italian primer of the 13th century.
- Robert von Blois Sämmtliche Werke; as editor (3 volumes, 1889–95) – Robert de Blois' collected works.
- Französische Volkslieder, 1899 – French folk songs.
- Trubert. Altfranzösischer schelmenroman des Douin de Lavesne; as editor, 1904 – Trubert; Old French picaresque novel of Douin de Lavesne.
- Die hundert alten Erzählungen, 1905 – 100 old narratives.
- Romanische schelmennovellen, 1905 – Romansh picaresque novels.
- Proben der lateinischen Novellistik des Mittelalters, 1906 – Samples of Latin novelistic during the Middle Ages.
- Der engadinische Psalter des Chiampel (as editor, 1906) – The Engadin psalter of Ulrich Campell.
