= Tobler =

Tobler may refer to:

- Tobler (name), a surname originating in Germany (and list of people with the name)
- Tom Brownlees or Tobler, an Australian rules football player
- Tobler hyperelliptical projection, a family of map projections
- Chocolat Tobler, a Swiss chocolate manufacturer, maker of Toblerone
- Villa Tobler, a listed building in Zürich, Switzerland
- Tobler's crow (Euploea tobleri), a species of nymphalid butterfly

== See also ==
- Tobler's first law of geography, according to Waldo Tobler
