= Louis Gauchat =

Swiss linguist

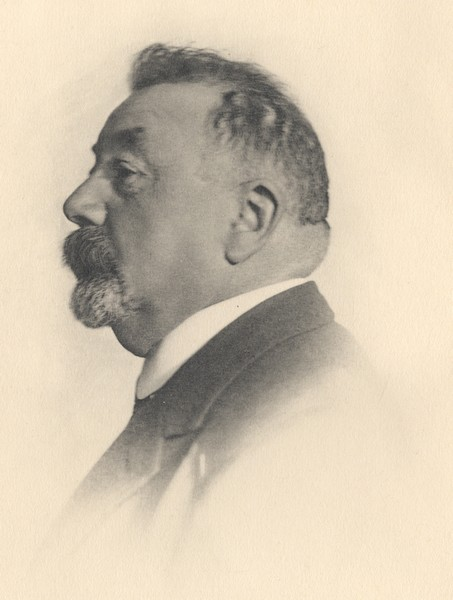
- Photograph of Gauchat
- Born: 12 January 1866; Las Brenets, Switzerland
- Died: 22 August 1942 (aged 76); Lenzerheide
- Education: University of Zürich
- Occupation: Linguist

Louis Gauchat (born 12 January 1866 in Les Brenets, Switzerland; died 22 August 1942 in Lenzerheide) was a Swiss linguist.

== Career ==
He studied at the University of Zürich under Heinrich Morf and in Paris as a pupil of Gaston Paris, receiving his doctorate in 1890 with the dissertation Le patois de Dompierre. He later worked as a lecturer at Bern (1893–96) and Zürich (1897–1902). In 1902 was named a professor of Romance philology at the University of Bern. In 1907 he succeeded Jakob Ulrich at the University of Zürich, where he taught classes until 1931. In 1909, with Albert Bachmann, he founded the phonogram archives at the university. In 1926–28 he served as academic rector.

Gauchat studied the French language spoken in Switzerland. In 1899 he founded Glossaire des patois de la Suisse romande (Glossary of dialects of French-speaking Switzerland), an institution to publish studies of Switzerland's French dialects. The institute receives subsidies from French-speaking cantons and the Swiss Confederation. Jules Jeanjaquet and Ernest Tappolet assisted in phonetic survey work. The first issue of the glossary was published in 1924.

== Published works ==
His 1905 article on the vernacular of the Swiss village of Charmey is considered a precursor in the field of sociolinguistics.

- Le patois de Dompierre, Halle sur Saale: E. Karras, impr., 1891 (dissertation thesis).
- Etude sur le ranz des vaches fribourgeois, Zürich: Zürcher und Furrer, 1899.
- L’unité phonétique dans le patois d’une commune, in: Aus romanischen Sprachen und Literaturen. Festschrift Heinrich Morf, Halle and d. Saale 1905, Nachdruck Genève 1980, S. 175–232.
- Grammaire et lexicographie des patois de la Suisse romande: Bibliographie analytique, Neuchâtel 1916
- Les noms de lieux et de personnes de la Suisse romande: Bibliographie analytique, Neuchâtel 1919
- Glossaire des patois de la Suisse romande fondé par Louis Gauchat, Jules Jeanjaquet, Ernst Tappolet, Neuchâtel 1924 ff.
