= Ferdinand Vetter =

Swiss germanist (1847–1924)

Ferdinand Vetter (3 February 1847, in Osterfingen – 6 August 1924, in St. George's Abbey, Stein am Rhein) was a Swiss Germanist and medievalist.

From 1866 to 1868, He studied under philologist Wilhelm Wackernagel and historian Jacob Burckhardt at the University of Basel, then continued his education at the universities of Berlin and Göttingen. Following graduation, he taught classes at the cantonal school in Chur, and from 1874 worked as a schoolteacher in Aarau. In 1876, he became an associate professor at the University of Bern, where in 1886 he was appointed professor of German philology. In 1909 and 1910, he served as university rector.

In 1891, he founded the magazine Schweizerische Rundschau, of which he worked as editor until 1897. He is credited with the restoration of Sankt-Georgen monastery at Stein am Rhein, which had been taken over by his father.

== Selected works ==
- Zum Muspilli und zur germanischen Allitterationspoesie, 1872 – On Muspilli and Germanic alliteration poetry.
- Ueber die sage von der herkunft der Schwyzer und Oberhasler aus Schweden und Friesland, 1877 – On the legend of the origin of the Schwyz and Oberhasli from Sweden and Friesland.
- Das Sankt-Georgen-Kloster in Stein am Rhein, 1884 – St. George's monastery in Stein am Rhein.
- Das Schachzabelbuch Kunrats von Ammenhausen, 1892 – The chessbook of Konrad von Ammenhausen.
- Die neuentdeckte deutsche Bibeldichtung des neunten Jahrhunderts, 1885 – A newly discovered German bibliography of the 9th century.
- Jeremias Gotthelf: Volksausgabe seiner Werke im Urtext (10 volumes, 1898) – Jeremias Gotthelf; edition of his works in the original text.
