= Buochserhorn =

Mountain in Switzerland

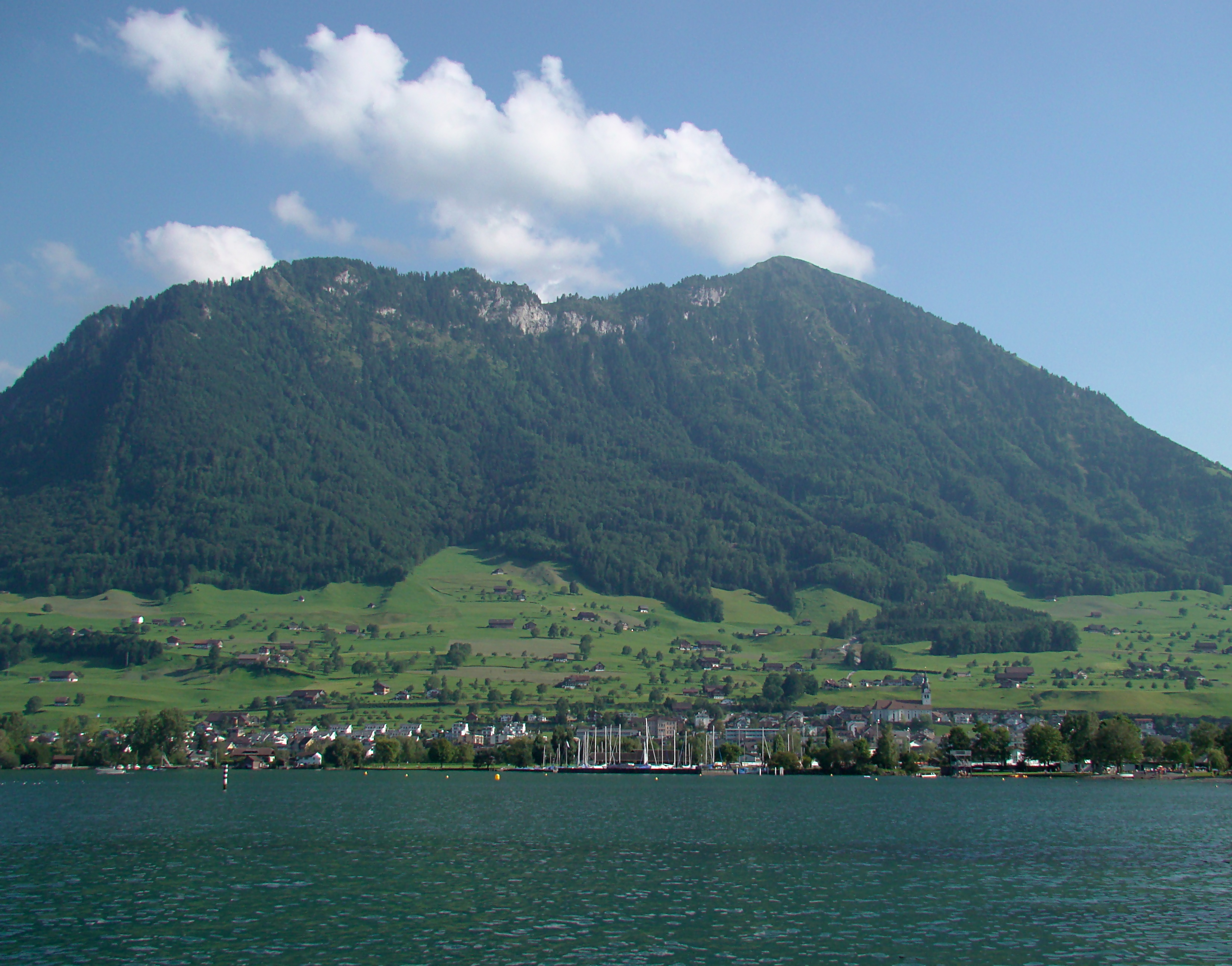
- Buochs with the Buochserhorn

Highest point
- Elevation: 1,807 m (5,928 ft)
- Prominence: 227 m (745 ft)
- Coordinates: 46°56′44″N 8°25′43″E

Geography
- Location within Switzerland
- Location: Nidwalden, Switzerland
- Parent range: Swiss Prealps

The Buochserhorn is a mountain of the Swiss Prealps, overlooking Lake Lucerne near Buochs in the canton of Nidwalden. It lies on the range west of the Schwalmis.
