= Brisen =

Mountain in Switzerland

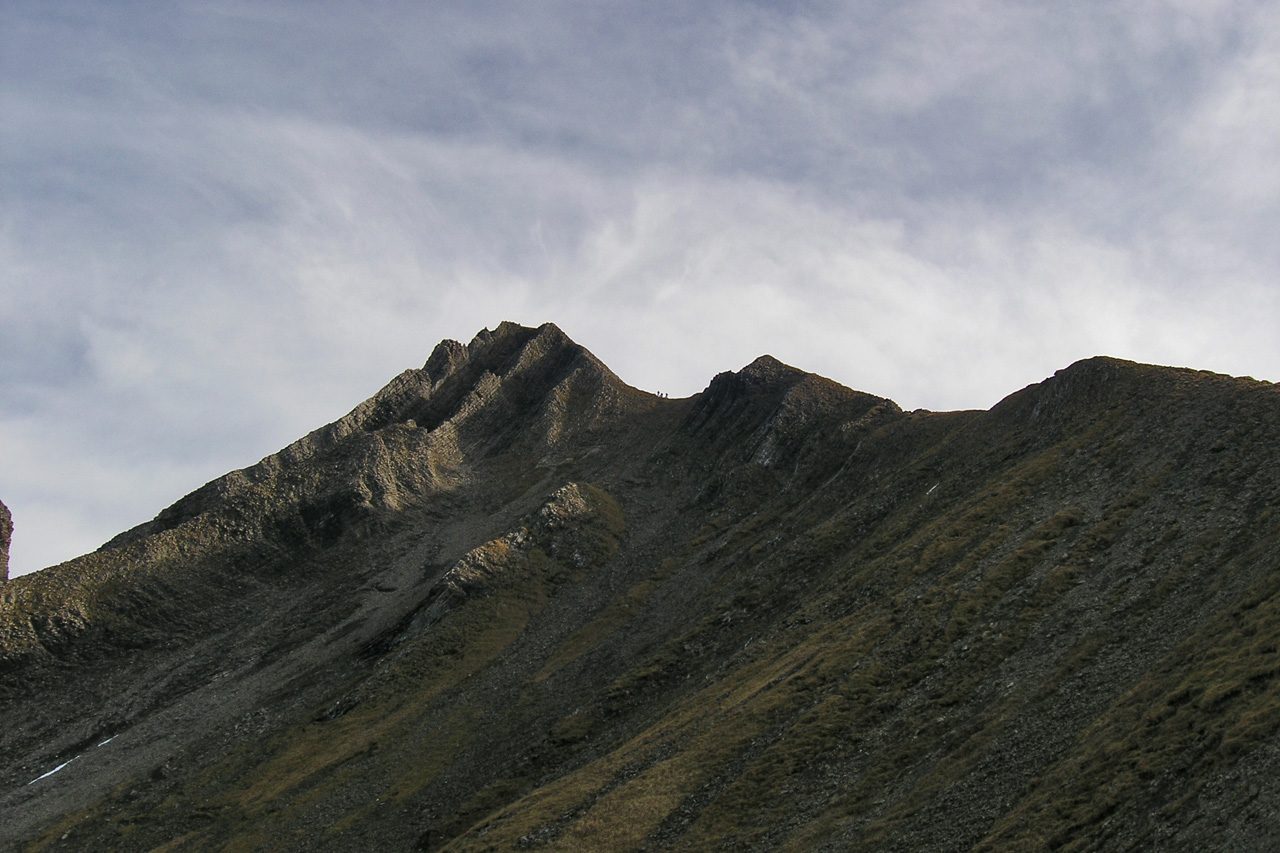
- The Brisen from the Haldigrat

Highest point
- Elevation: 2,404 m (7,887 ft)
- Prominence: 72 m (236 ft)
- Parent peak: Hoh Brisen
- Coordinates: 46°53′55.5″N 8°27′30″E

Geography
- Location within Switzerland
- Location: Nidwalden/Uri, Switzerland
- Parent range: Urner Alps

The Brisen is a mountain of the Urner Alps, located on the border between the cantons of Nidwalden and Uri, in Central Switzerland. It is located near the slightly higher Hoh Brisen.

The western ridge named Haldigrat is the easiest way to the summit.
