= Schwalmis =

Mountain in Switzerland

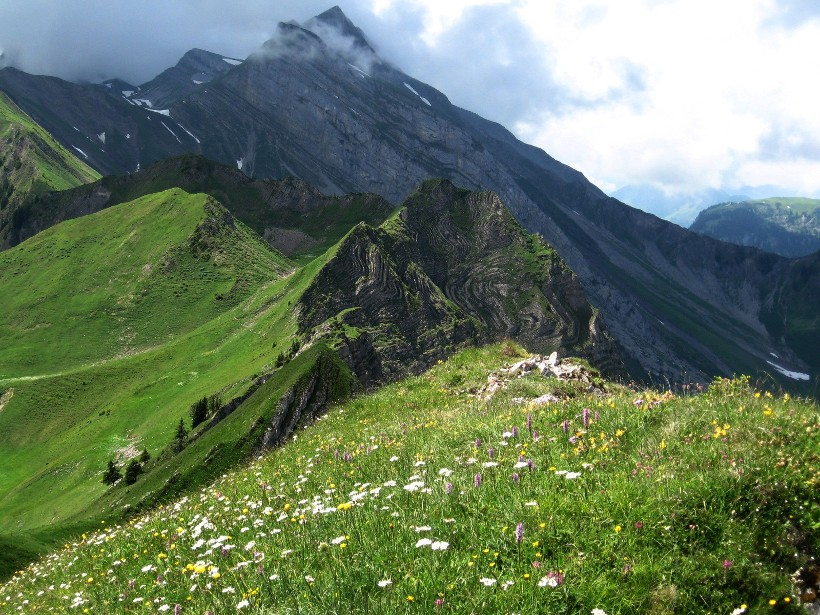
- The Schwalmis (background) from the east side

Highest point
- Elevation: 2,246 m (7,369 ft)
- Prominence: 141 m (463 ft)
- Parent peak: Hoh Brisen
- Coordinates: 46°55′6.5″N 8°29′37″E

Geography
- Location within Switzerland
- Location: Nidwalden/Uri, Switzerland
- Parent range: Urner Alps

The Schwalmis is a mountain of the Urner Alps, overlooking Lake Lucerne in Central Switzerland. Its 2,246-metre-high (7,369 ft) summit lies on the border between the cantons of Nidwalden and Uri.
