= Jakob Baechtold =

Swiss literary scholar

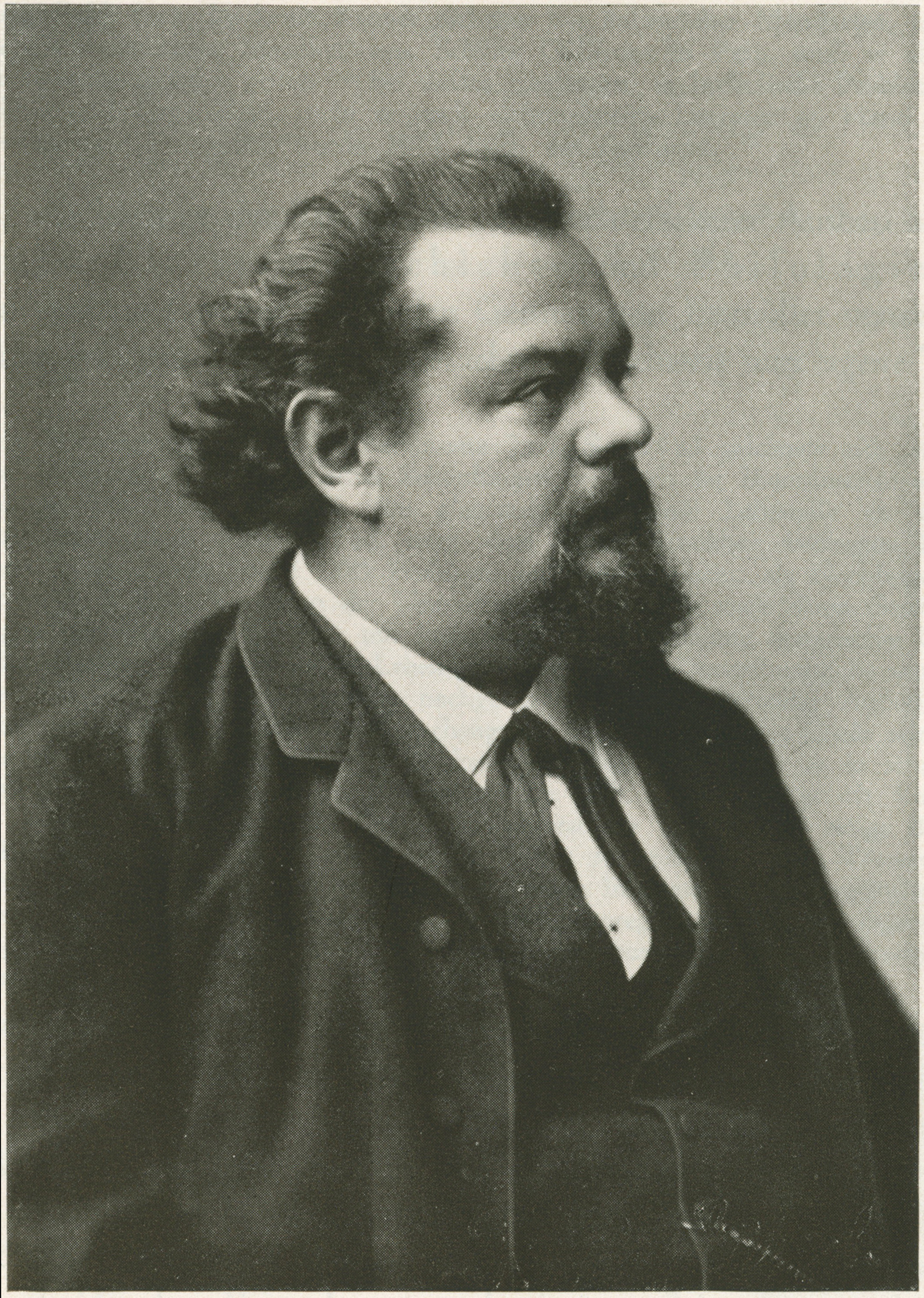
Jakob Baechtold

Jakob Baechtold, surname sometimes spelled as Bächtold (27 January 1848, Schleitheim – 7 August 1897, Zurich) was a Swiss literary scholar.

He studied German philology under Adolf Holtzmann at Heidelberg University, then continued his education at the Ludwig-Maximilians-Universität München, and in 1870, he received his doctorate from the University of Tübingen with a thesis on the Lanzelet of Ulrich von Zatzikhoven. From 1872, he worked as a schoolteacher in Solothurn and Zurich, and from 1879 to 1884 he headed the feuilleton of the Neue Zürcher Zeitung (NZZ).

In 1880, he obtained his habilitation at the University of Zurich, where in 1888 he was named a full professor of German literature. In Zurich, he also gave lectures at the Polytechnic School from 1896.

== Selected works ==
- Lexicalisch-etymologische und grammatische Versuche älterer Zeit, 1876 – Lexicologic-etymological and grammatical essays from an earlier era.
- Bibliothek älterer Schriftwerke der deutschen Schweiz und ihres Grenzgebietes (edited with Ferdinand Vetter; 1877–1892) – Library of older literary works of German-speaking Switzerland and its border areas.
- Gedichte (by Heinrich Leuthold; edited by Baechtold, 2nd edition 1880).
- Deutsches lesebuch für höhere Lehranstalten der Schweiz, 1880 – German reader for higher educational institutions in Switzerland.
- Geschichte der Deutschen Literatur in der Schweiz, 1892 – History of German literature in Switzerland.
- Gottfried Kellers Leben (3 volumes, 1894–1897) – Biography of Gottfried Keller.

He was the author of numerous biographies in the Allgemeine Deutsche Biographie.
