= Nick Tobler =

American TikToker

Nick Tobler (born November 1996) is an American TikToker best known for raising eels and other fish in his house's cistern.

== Biography ==
Tobler grew up in Erlanger, Kentucky. As a child, he was known to catch snakes, frogs, and toads, and bring them home. He enjoyed playing Animal Crossing and Pokémon. Later, as a student, he worked for PetSmart and a local pet store.

He graduated from Northern Kentucky University in 2021, and has worked as an aquarium store manager.

Tobler and his brother moved into a new house in Taylor Mill, which was built by Tobler's grandfather, in March 2022.

Tobler has owned both scorpions and tarantulas in the past. In 2022, he owned a black widow, "fifteen tortoises, several lizards, and fish," including a lungfish. He and his brother breed Indian Star tortoises.

== Online presence ==
Tobler had been posting videos about aquatic animals to YouTube since the early 2010s, when he was in 8th grade. He started a TikTok account in 2021.

In March 2022, Tobler began posting on TikTok about his attempts to turn the cistern under his 1958 home's garage into an "eel pit". The 288-ft cistern had originally been used to collect rainwater, but had become obsolete when the house became connected to the city's water supply. A week after posting his first video on the project, his followers had jumped from 200 to more than 100,000.

Tobler installed artificial lights, air pumps, and water filter into the cistern, and introduced goldfish, a catfish, and two crayfish into the water.

He had 200,000 followers by May 2023. By mid-June 2023, when Tobler finally introduced eleven American eels to the enclosure, he had gained more than 350,000 followers. The eels were given names taken from TikTok users' comments.

Further additions to the eel pit have included sturgeon and gar.
