= Friedrich Staub =

Swiss lexicographer (1826–1896)

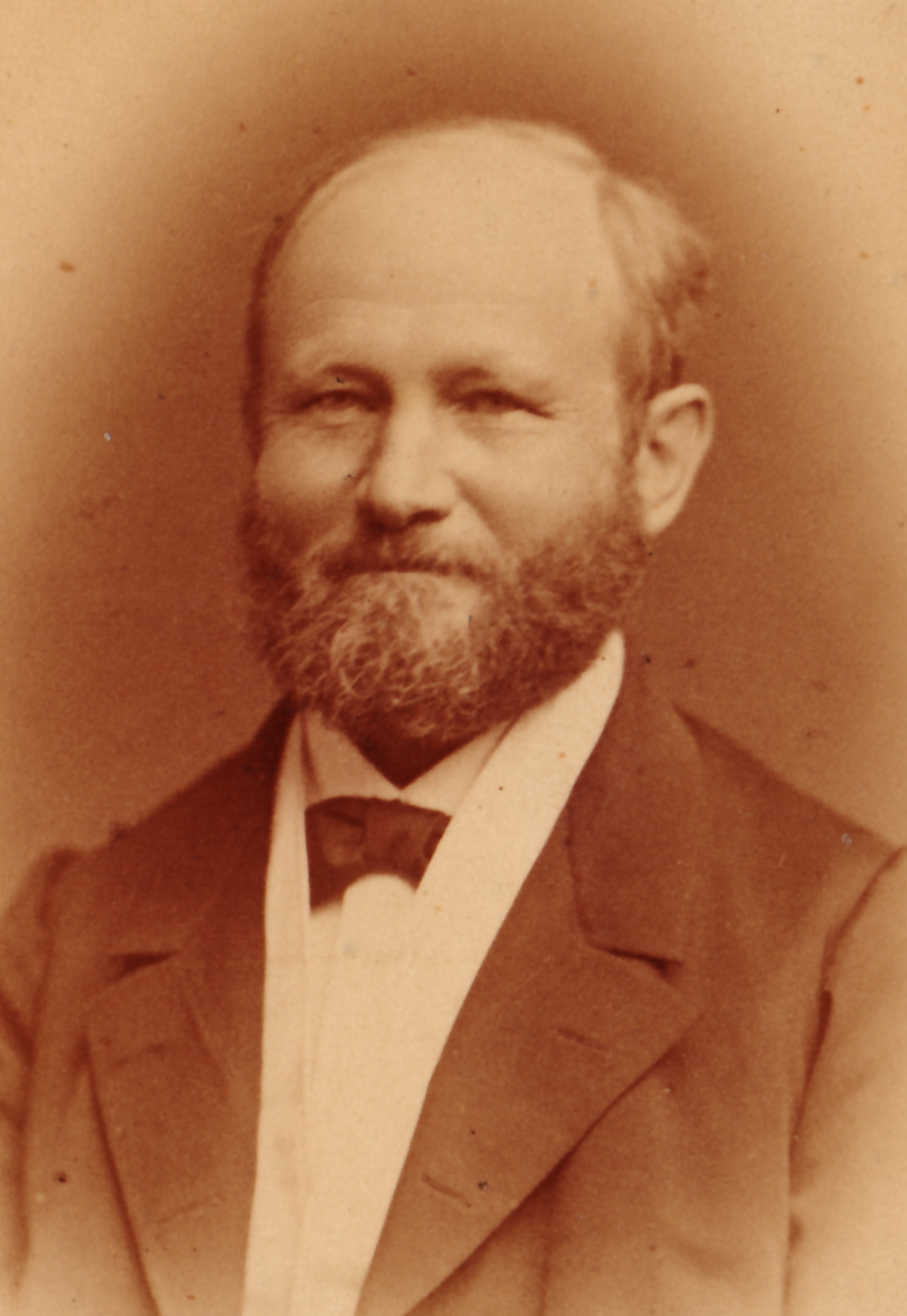
- Born: 30 March 1826; Männedorf, Switzerland
- Died: 3 August 1896 (aged 70); Zurich-Fluntern, Switzerland
- Education: University of Zürich; University of Bonn
- Known for: Schweizerisches Idiotikon, Staub's law
- Scientific career
- Fields: dialectology, lexicography
- Workplaces: Zentralbibliothek Zürich

Friedrich Staub (30 March 1826 – 3 August 1896) was a Swiss lexicographer, dialectologist and librarian.

He studied theology and philosophy at the University of Zürich (1845–47) and philology at the University of Bonn (1847–48). From 1850 to 1858 he was in charge of a private school in his hometown of Männedorf, and afterwards spent several years as a private tutor in Zürich. From 1871 to 1887 he worked as a librarian at the Zentralbibliothek Zürich. He was a catalyst in the creation of the Schweizerische Nationalbibliothek (Swiss National Library).

From 1862 he headed the Verein für das Schweizerdeutsche Wörterbuch (Association for the Swiss-German Dictionary) and up until 1896 was editor-in-chief of the Schweizerisches Idiotikon ("Swiss idioticon", a dictionary of the Swiss-German language). In 1881, with Ludwig Tobler, he published its first fascicle. In 1874 he published a treatise on the vocalization of the consonant "n" in Swiss Alemannic ("Staub's law"), titled Die Vokalisierung des N bei den schweizerischen Alemannen.
