= Konrad von Ammenhausen =

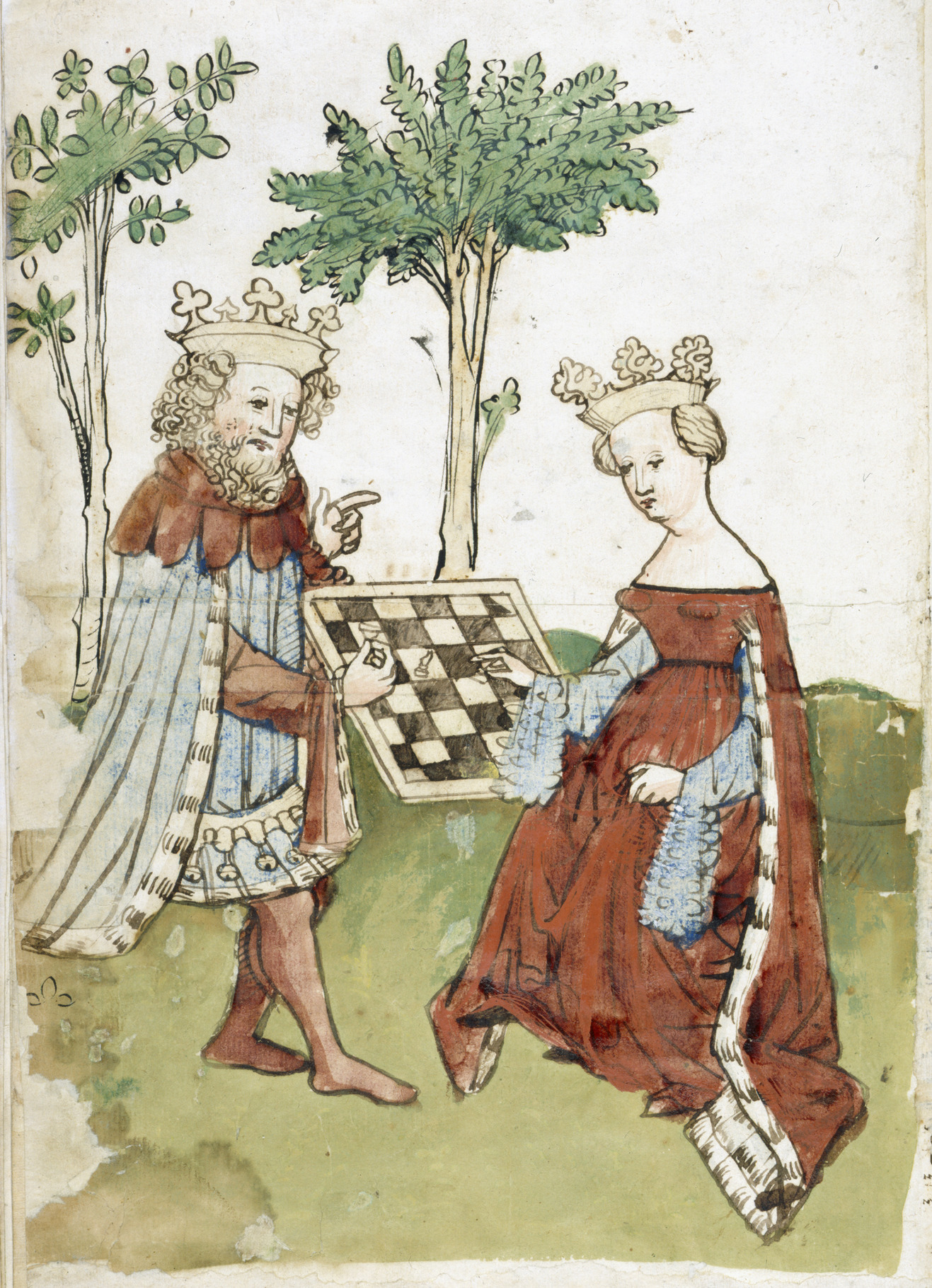
King and queen playing chess - Das Schachzabelbuch (15th century)

Konrad von Ammenhausen (born c. 1300) was a Swiss Benedictine monk and priest at Stein am Rhein. He is primarily known for his Schachzabelbuch, a Middle High German verse translation of the Liber de moribus hominum et officiis nobilum ac popularium super ludo scacchorum by Jacobus de Cessolis, completed in 1337. The work survives in more than 20 manuscripts and was frequently printed in the 16th century.
