= Hoh Brisen =

Mountain in Switzerland

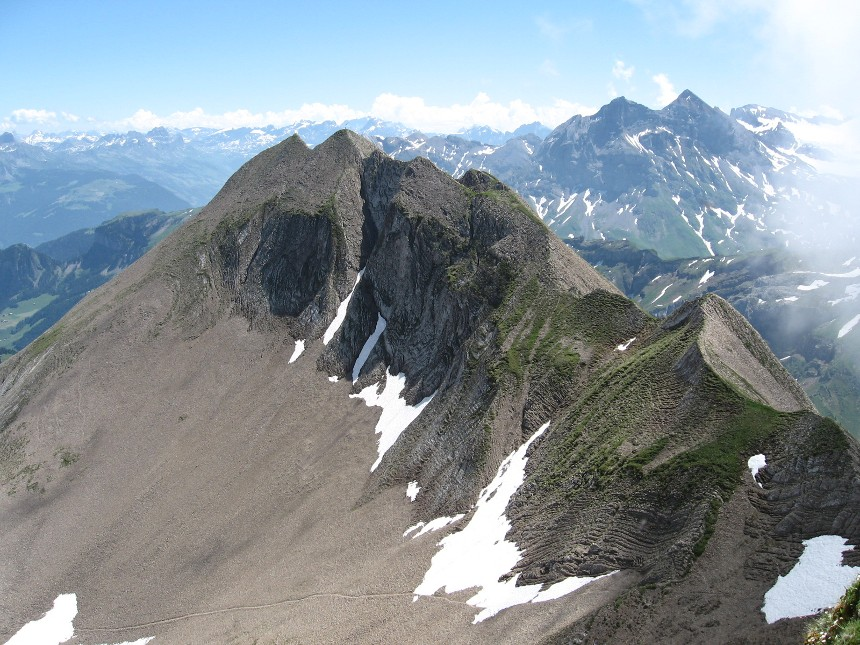
- The Hoh Brisen from the Brisen

Highest point
- Elevation: 2,413 m (7,917 ft)
- Prominence: 498 m (1,634 ft)
- Coordinates: 46°53′51″N 8°27′56.5″E

Geography
- Location within Switzerland
- Location: Nidwalden/Uri, Switzerland
- Parent range: Urner Alps

The Hoh Brisen is a mountain of the Urner Alps, located on the border between the cantons of Nidwalden and Uri, in Central Switzerland. With an altitude of 2,413 metres above sea level, the Hoh Brisen is the highest summit of the subrange north of the Sinsgäuer Schonegg pass (1,915 m).
