= Albert Bachmann (philologist) =

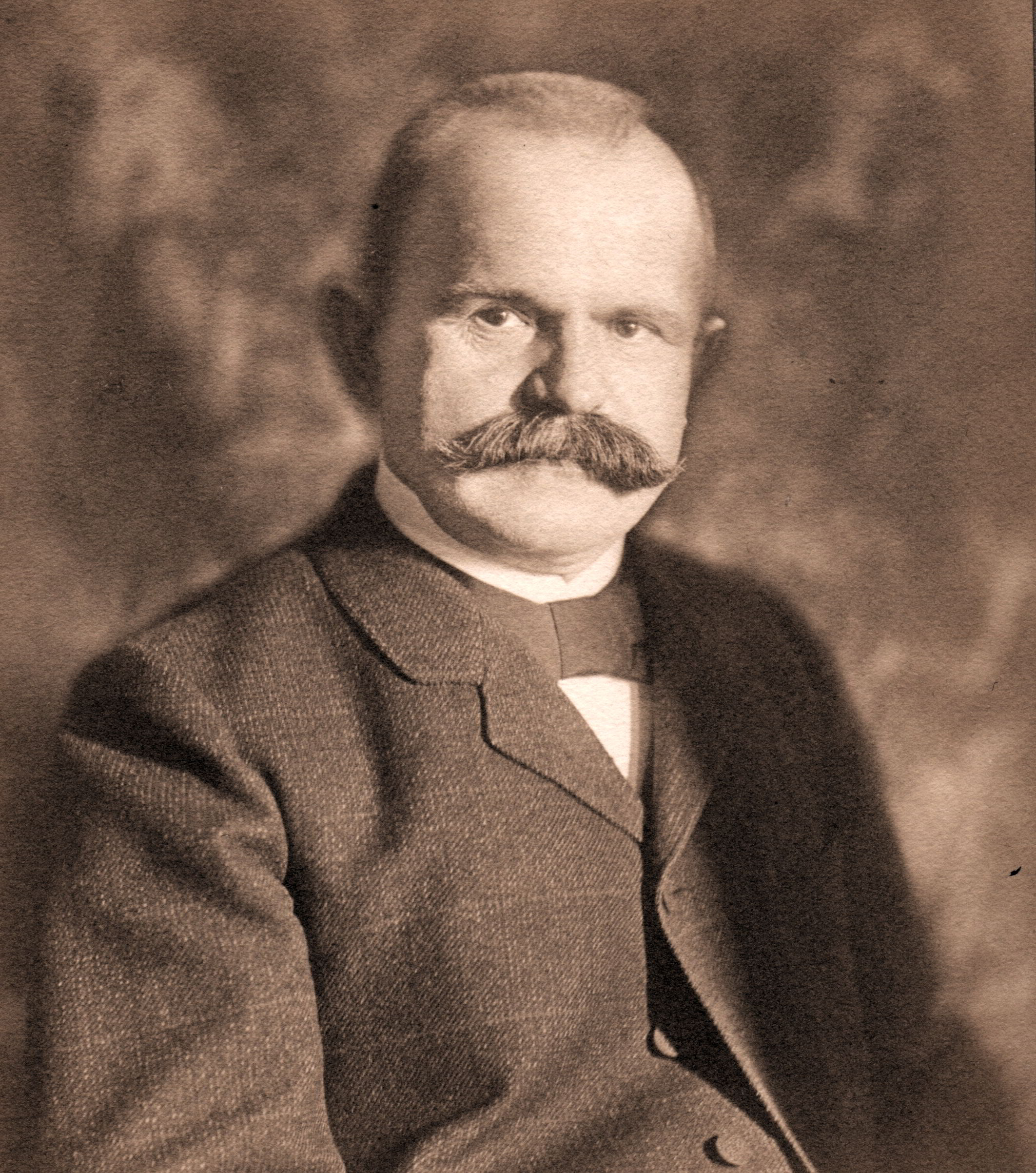
Albert Bachmann (1863–1934).

Johann Albert Bachmann (12 November 1863, in Hüttwilen – 30 January 1934, in Samedan) was a Swiss lexicographer and dialectologist, professor for Germanic philology at Zürich University from 1896. From 1892 he was an editor of the Schweizerisches Idiotikon dictionary, acting as editor-in-chief from 1896 until his death. Bachmann specialized on Swiss German dialects. He edited the series Beiträge zur Schweizerdeutschen Grammatik (20 vols) and founded, together with Louis Gauchat, the Phonographic Archive of Zurich University in 1913.

== Works ==
- Beiträge zur Geschichte der schweizerischen Gutturallaute. Genossenschafts-Buchdruckerei, diss. Zürich 1886.
- (ed., with Samuel Singer): Deutsche Volksbücher aus einer Zürcher Handschrift des fünfzehnten Jahrhunderts. Litterarischer Verein in Stuttgart, Tübingen 1889 (Bibliothek des Litterarischen Vereins in Stuttgart 185).
- (ed.): Morgant der Riese. Litterarischer Verein in Stuttgart, Tübingen 1890 (Bibliothek des Litterarischen Vereins in Stuttgart 189).
- (ed.): Die Haimonskinder. Litterarischer Verein in Stuttgart, Tübingen 1895 (Bibliothek des Litterarischen Vereins in Stuttgart 206).
- Mittelhochdeutsches Lesebuch mit Grammatik und Wörterbuch. Höhr, Zürich 1892.
- Sprachen und Mundarten. I. Deutsch. In: Geographisches Lexikon der Schweiz. Vol. 5. Gebrüder Attinger, Neuenburg 1908, pp. 58–76.
- portions of Schweizerisches Idiotikon 1892–1934, vols. 3 to 10
- (ed.): Beiträge zur Schweizerdeutschen Grammatik. 20 vols. Huber, Frauenfeld 1910–1941.
