= Schweizerisches Idiotikon =

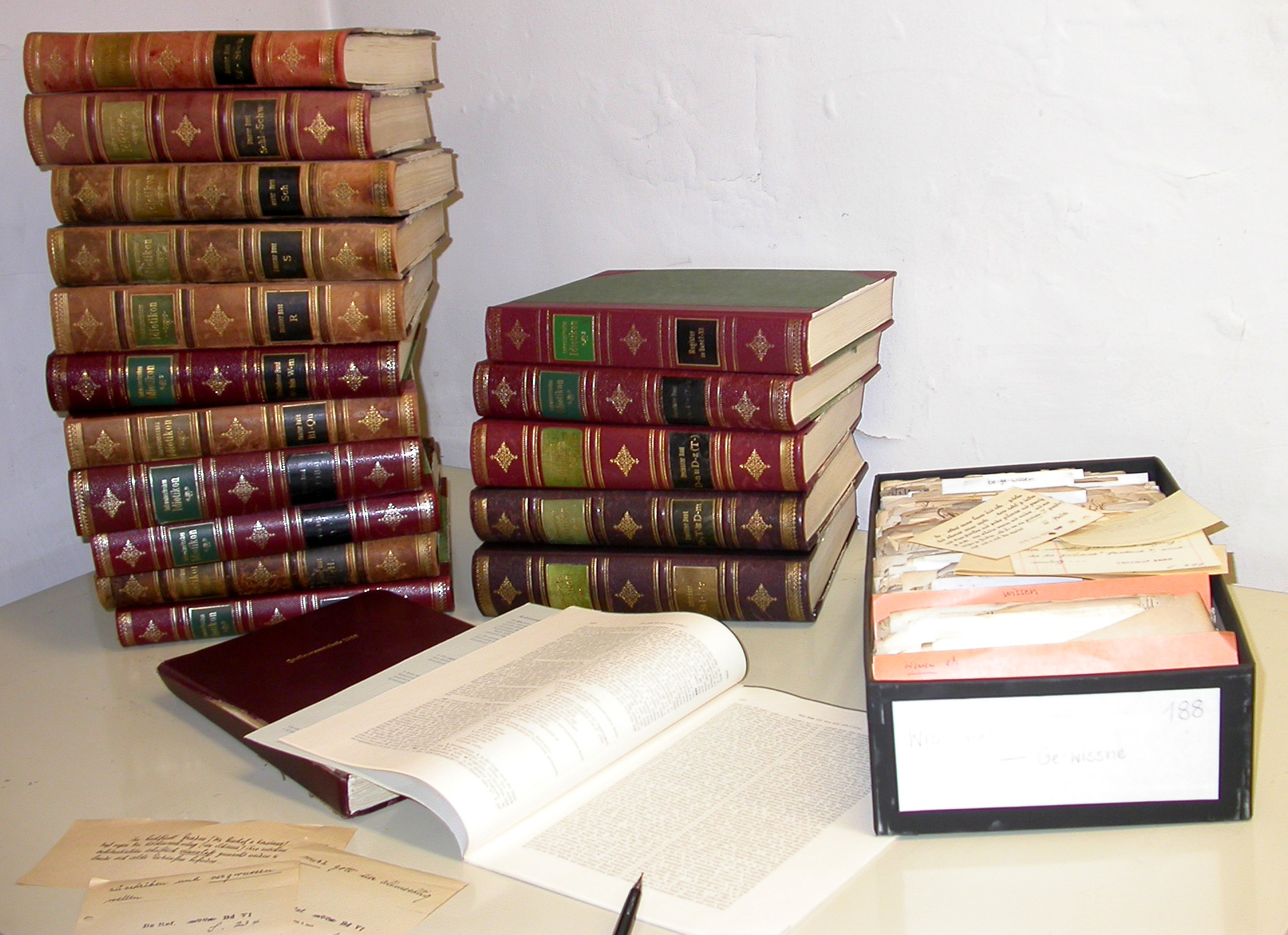
Schweizerisches Idiotikon

Schweizerisches Idiotikon ("the Swiss idioticon", also known as Wörterbuch der schweizerdeutschen Sprache "Dictionary of the Swiss German language") is an ongoing, major project of lexicography of the Swiss German dialects. Publication began in 1881 and is projected to be complete by 2022. Its scope includes the language since the end of the classical Middle High German period (13th century) and as such also represents the historical dictionary of the dialects of German-speaking Switzerland, and is one of the most detailed treatments of the Early Modern High German language in general. As of 2010, it contains 150,000 words.

The history of the project began in 1862 with the foundation of a Verein für das Schweizerdeutsche Wörterbuch, led by Friedrich Staub (1826–1896). Originally envisaged as a dictionary in four volumes, the first fascicle was published in 1881. From 1896, the project was led by Albert Bachmann (1863–1934), under whose editorship, the scope and depth of the project was greatly expanded; Bachmann endeavored to put the Idiotikon on the level with the other "national dictionary" projects edited in Germanic Europe at the time, the Deutsches Wörterbuch, Woordenboek der Nederlandsche Taal, Oxford English Dictionary and Svenska Akademiens ordbok. In this sense, the Idiotikon is the "national dictionary" of Alemannic Switzerland.

After Bachmann's death in 1934, the project was led by five editors-in-chief: Otto Gröger (1934–1951), Hans Wanner (1951–1974), Peter Dalcher (1974–1991), Peter Ott (1991–2005), Hans-Peter Schifferle (2005–2019), Hans Bickel (2019–2022) and Christoph Landolt (2022–present).

By 2012, 16 volumes had been published, covering the alphabet up to X. Volume 17, projected as the final volume, appears continuously. All published portions have been publicly accessible online since 2010 at idiotikon.ch.
