= Heinrich Schweizer-Sidler =

Swiss philologist (1815–1894)

Heinrich Schweizer-Sidler (September 12, 1815 – March 31, 1894) was a Swiss philologist born in Elgg in the canton of Zürich.

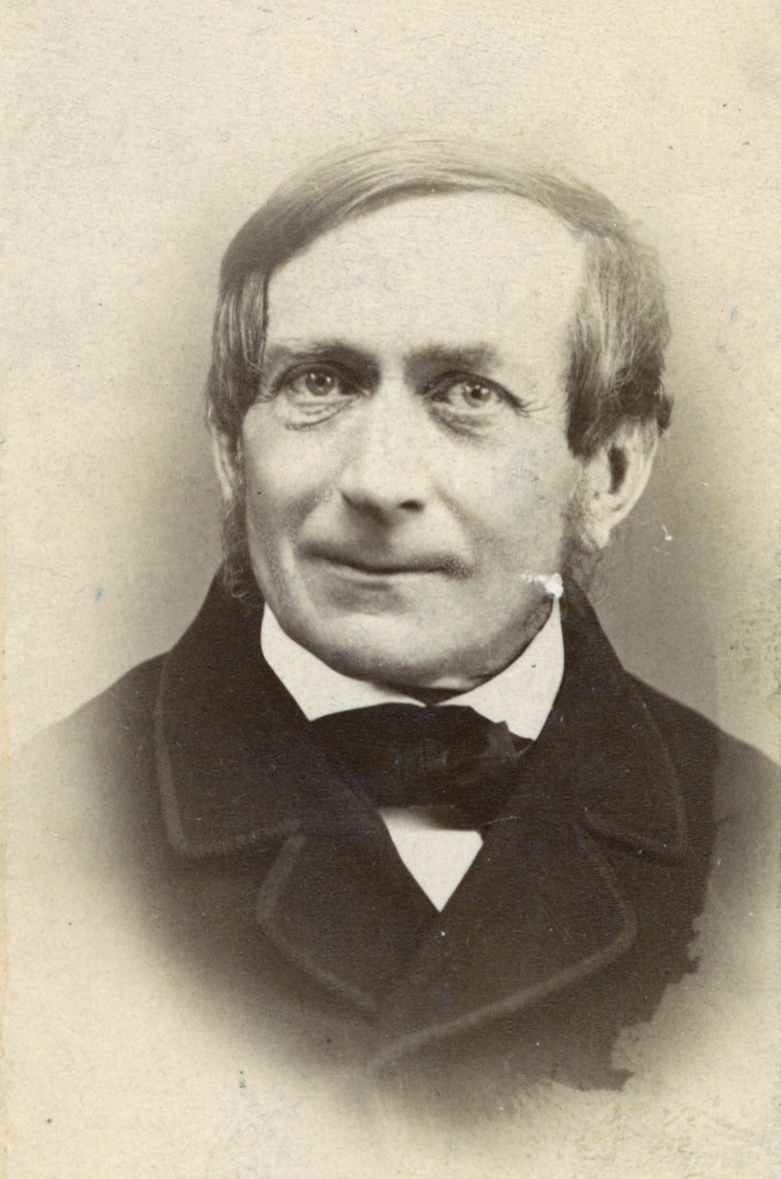
Portrait of Heinrich Schweizer-Sidler

From 1835 to 1838 he received his education at the University of Zürich, where he had as instructors, Johann Caspar von Orelli, Hermann Sauppe and Bernhard Hirzel. In 1838 he continued his studies in Berlin, afterwards returning to Zürich, where in 1841 he received his habilitation. Later, he taught classes in secondary schools in Aarau (1844–45) and Zürich (from 1845). In 1849 he became an associate professor at Zürich, and in 1864 was appointed a full professor of philology. In this position he specialized in Sanskrit and comparative linguistics.

Among his literary works was an 1871 edition of Tacitus' Germania, and two textbooks on the Latin language:

- Elementar- und Formenlehre der lateinischen Sprache ("Elemental and morphology of the Latin language"); (1869, second edition in 1888 with Alfred Surber).
- Grammatik der lateinischen Sprache ("Grammar of the Latin language"); (1888).
