= Seth Lerer =

American scholar (born 1955)

Seth Lerer (born 1955) is an American scholar and Professor of English. He specializes in historical analyses of the English language, and in addition to critical analyses of the works of several authors, particularly Geoffrey Chaucer. He is a Distinguished Professor Emeritus of Literature at the University of California, San Diego, where he served as the Dean of Arts and Humanities from 2009 to 2014. He previously held the Avalon Foundation Professorship in Humanities at Stanford University. Lerer won the 2010 Truman Capote Award for Literary Criticism and the 2009 National Book Critics Circle Award in Criticism for Children’s Literature: A Readers’ History from Aesop to Harry Potter.

== Life and career ==
Lerer was born in Brooklyn, New York City, and was awarded a Bachelor of Arts degree from Wesleyan University in 1976. He gained a second Bachelor of Arts and a Master of Arts degree from the University of Oxford in 1978. He was awarded a Doctor of Philosophy degree by the University of Chicago in 1981. He taught at Princeton University from 1981 to 1990 and at Stanford from 1991 to 2008. In 2009, he joined the faculty of UC-San Diego as Dean of Arts and Humanities and Distinguished Professor of Literature.

Lerer has received grants and fellowships from the John Simon Guggenheim Memorial Foundation, the National Endowment for the Humanities, and the Huntington Library. In 1996 he was the Hurst Visiting Professor at Washington University in St. Louis, and in 2002 he was the Helen Cam Fellow in Medieval Studies at Cambridge University. In 2015 he was the Keeley Visiting Fellow at Wadham College, Oxford. In 2016 he served as the M. H. Abrams Distinguished Visiting Professor at Cornell University.

Lerer's research interests include Medieval Studies, Renaissance studies, comparative philology, history of scholarship and children's literature. He has also published works on the history of reading and the culture of noble courts.

Lerer is widely recognised as a teacher and for his facility in Old and Middle English pronunciation, in particular the different dialects of Middle English. Several of his lecture series have been made available commercially.

== Published works ==
- Boethius and Dialogue (Princeton University Press, 1985, ISBN 9780691066530).
- Literacy and Power in Anglo-Saxon Literature (University of Nebraska Press, 1991, ISBN 9780803228955).
- Chaucer and His Readers (Princeton University Press, 1993, ISBN 9780691068114), awarded the Beatrice White Prize of the English Association of Great Britain.
- Courtly Letters in the Age of Henry VIII (Cambridge University Press, 1997, ISBN 9780521035279).
- Error and the Academic Self: The Scholarly Imagination, Medieval to Modern (Columbia University Press, 2002, ISBN 9780231123723), awarded the Harry Levin Prize of the American Comparative Literature Association.
- Inventing English: A Portable History of the Language (Columbia University Press, 2007, ISBN 9780231137942).
- Children's Literature: A Reader's History from Aesop to Harry Potter (University of Chicago Press, 2008, ISBN 9780226473000), awarded the National Book Critics Circle Award in Criticism and the Truman Capote Award for Literary Criticism.
- Grahame, K., The Wind in the Willows: An Annotated Edition, edited by Seth Lerer. (Belknap Press / Harvard University Press, 2009, ISBN 9780674034471).
- Prospero's Son: Life, Books, Love, and Theater (University of Chicago Press, 2013, ISBN 9780226014418).
- Shakespeare's Lyric Stage: Myth, Music, and Poetry in the Last Plays (University of Chicago Press, 2018, ISBN 978-0-226-58240-5)
