= Adolf Tobler =

Swiss-German linguist and philologist

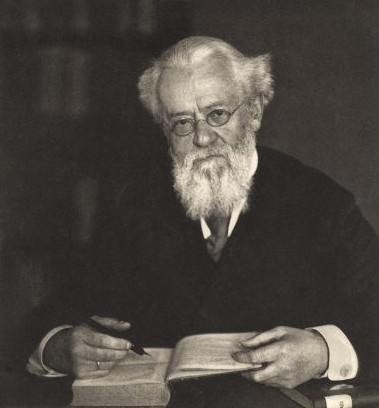
- Adolf Tobler, photograph by Nicola Perscheid (1904)
- Born: 24 May 1835; Hirzel, Zürich, Switzerland
- Died: 18 March 1910 (aged 74); Berlin, Germany
- Relatives: Ludwig Tobler (brother)

Adolf Tobler (24 May 1835 – 18 March 1910) was a Swiss-German linguist and a philologist. Born in Hirzel in Zürich, Switzerland, he was a brother to linguist Ludwig Tobler (1827–1895). Adolf Tobler died in Berlin, Germany.

== Education and work-life ==
He studied Romance philology at the universities of Zürich and Bonn, receiving his doctorate in 1857. At Bonn, he was influenced by the teachings of Friedrich Christian Diez and Nicolaus Delius.

After graduation, he worked as a schoolteacher at the Solothurn cantonal school, and then at the gymnasium in Bern. In 1867, he relocated to the University of Berlin, where, from 1871 up until his death, he held the chair of Romance philology. In 1890–91, he served as the university rector.

The "Tobler-Mussafia law", a grammatical rule applicable to Romance languages, is named after Tobler and the Austrian philologist Adolf Mussafia.

== Published works ==
Among his better-written efforts was the five-volume Vermischte Beiträge zur französischen Grammatik ("Miscellaneous contributions to French grammar";1886–1912). His creation of an Old French dictionary was unfinished at the time of his death, being posthumously edited and published by Erhard Lommatzsch ("Tobler-Lommatzsch", Altfranzösisches Wörterbuch; 11 volumes). Other noted works by Tobler include:

- Gedichte von Jehan de Condet nach der casanatensischen Handschrift, 1860 – Poems by Jean de Condé according to the Casanatensian manuscript.
- Aus der Chanson de geste von Auberi nach einer vaticanischen Handschrift, 1870 – From the Chanson de geste of Auberi, according to a Vatican manuscript.
- Li dis dou vrai aniel. Die Parabel von dem ächten Ringe, Französische Dichtung des dreizehnten Jahrhunderts, 1871 – Li dis dou vrai aniel. The parable of the true ring, French poetry of the 13th century.
- Vom französischen Versbau alter und neuer Zeit. Zusammenstellung der Anfangsgründe, 1880 – On French versification of old and modern times.
