= Heinrich Breitinger =

Swiss literary historian and philologist

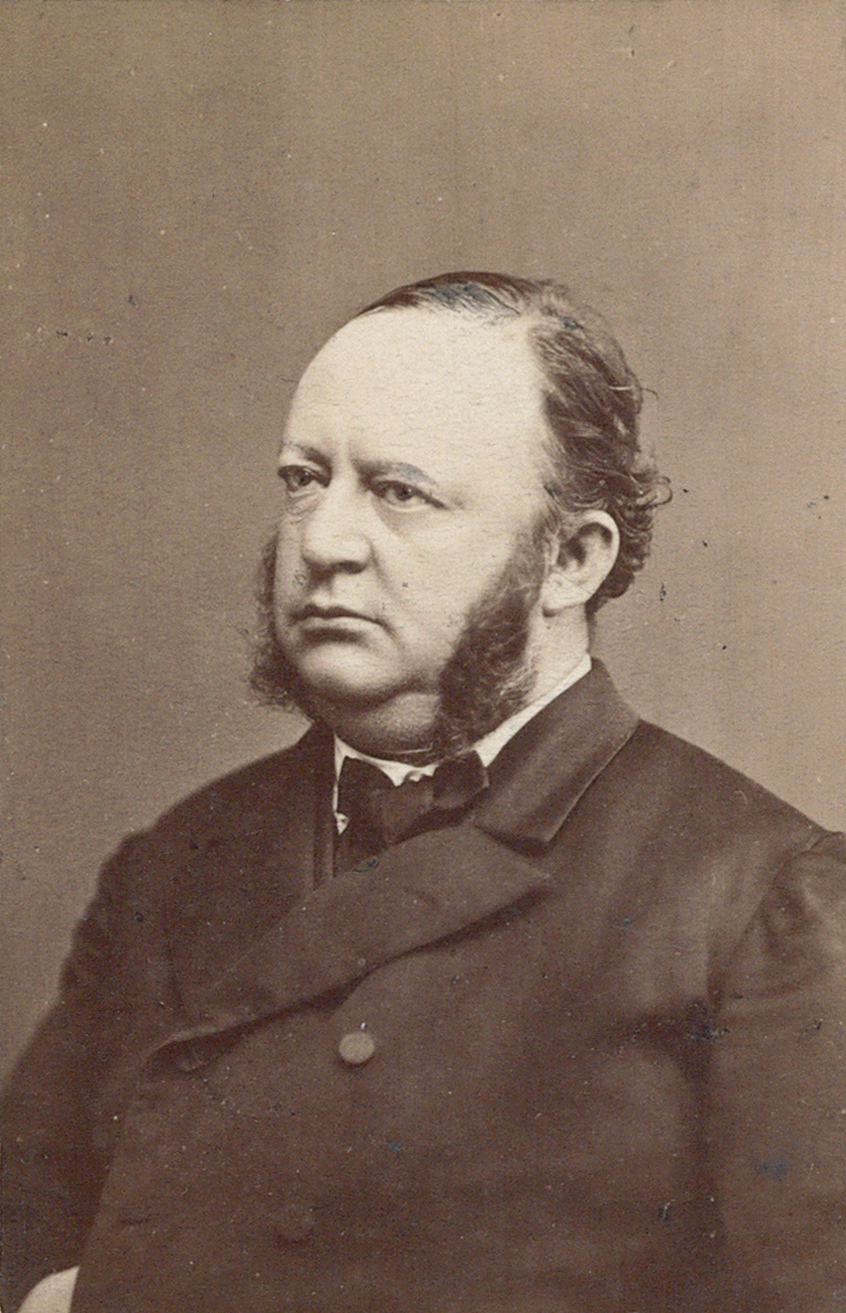
Heinrich Breitlinger

Heinrich Breitinger (11 March 1832, in Ellikon an der Thur – 2 March 1889, in Zürich) was a Swiss literary historian and philologist.

He studied medicine at the Ludwig-Maximilians-Universität München and the University of Zurich, but due to a hand injury as the result of a duel, he was forced to leave the medical field. He then studied modern languages at the University of Zurich, the University of Basel, and the University of Lausanne, and from 1857 taught French and English classes at the cantonal school in Frauenfeld. From 1876 until his death, he was a full professor of modern languages at the University of Zurich.

== Selected works ==
- Der Salon Rambouillet und seine kulturgeschichtliche bedeutung, 1874 – The Salon Rambouillet and its culturo-historical importance.
- Die Vermittler des deutschen Geistes in Frankreich, 1876 – Mediators of the German spirit in France.
- Das Studium des Italienischen : die Entwicklung der Litterärsprache, 1879 – The study of Italian: the development of the literary language.
- Aus neuern litteraturen, 1879 – On modern literature.
- Les unités d'Aristote avant le Cid de Corneille : étude de littérature comparée (1879, 2nd edition 1895) – The unities of Aristotle and Le Cid of Pierre Corneille; a study of comparative literature.
- Studium und Unterricht des Französischen : ein encyklopädischer Leitfaden (2nd edition 1885) – Study and teaching of French: an encyclopedic guide.
- Die Briefe der Frau von Staël an Jakob Heinrich Meister, 1890 – The letters of Germaine de Staël to Jacques-Henri Meister.
- Studien und Wandertage : Mit Portrait und Lebensabriss, 1890.
- Grundzüge der englischen litteratur- und sprachgeschichte (3rd edition, 1896) – Principles of the history of English literature and linguistics.

He was also the author of a few biographies in the Allgemeine Deutsche Biographie.
