= Richard Utz =

German-born medievalist (born 1961)

Richard Johann Utz (born 1961) is a German-born medievalist who has spent much of his career in North America. He specializes in medieval studies, and served as president of the International Society for the Study of Medievalism (2009–2020).

== Biography ==
Richard Utz was born in Amberg, Germany in 1961. He was educated at the University of Regensburg, Germany, and Williams College, USA, where he studied English and German literature and linguistics with Karl Heinz Göller, Maureen Fries, Otto Hietsch, Gerhard Hahn, Sherron Knopp, Ernst von Reusner, and Hans Dieter Schäfer. He received his PhD at Regensburg in 1990 and then garnered a German Academic Exchange Service Teaching Grant to help reestablish English Studies in Dresden, East Germany, after the fall of the Berlin Wall. He has worked as educator and administrator at the University of Northern Iowa (1991–1996; 1998–2007), the University of Tübingen (1996–1998), Western Michigan University (2007–2012), and the University of Bamberg (Johann von Spix International Professorship). Utz was also affiliated with the Medieval Institute at Western Michigan University (2007–2012), and Centre for the Study of the Heritage of Medieval Rituals, an international research center located at the University of Copenhagen and funded by the Danish National Research Foundation (2002-2010), and he founded and co-edited the book series Disputatio (Northwestern UP; later Brepols) and the online journals Medievally Speaking, Prolepsis: The Heidelberg Review of English Studies, and UNIversitas. Utz has been honored with a number of awards for teaching and scholarship, among them the University of Northern Iowa "Distinguished Scholar Award" and the Iowa Board or Regents award for faculty excellence." From 2012 through 2024, he has served as Chair of the School of Literature, Media, and Communication; Associate Dean for Faculty Affairs; Senior Associate Dean; and currently Interim Dean in the Ivan Allen College of Liberal Arts at Georgia Tech.

== Scholarly work ==
=== Literary Nominalism ===
One of Utz's major contributions to scholarship is the introduction of the paradigm of Literary Nominalism to the study of medieval literature, specifically the works of Geoffrey Chaucer. Grover Furr called Utz "perhaps the foremost exponent of the 'paradigm' of Nominalist influence upon late Medieval English literature. His own book and the collection of essays which he edited in 1995, are among the leading causes of the revival of interest by literary scholars in the influence of Nominalism." Utz posits the possibility of correspondences between late medieval philosophy/religion and literature. More specifically, he finds in certain features of Chaucer's Troilus and Criseyde and Canterbury Tales echoes of late medieval nominalist mentalities, a strand of thought cultural historians such as Rosario Assunto, Friedrich Heer, Erwin Panofsky, Sheila Delany, and Hans Blumenberg count among the decisive factors ushering in the formation of modern Europe. He claims that the author's literary nominalism led him to: construct narratives that center on the ontological status of universals and particulars (with a preference for the latter); focus on the radical contingency of language; challenge allegorical (hence: Neoplatonic ‘realist’) forms of narrative, character, and argument; experiment with non-conclusive, contingent, indeterminate, and fragmentary poetic structures; see a relationship between the God's absolute and ordinate powers on the one hand, and God and humanity, rulers, subjects, and authors on the other. These late medieval nominalist features, Utz proposes, may well be responsible for modern readers' pronounced preference for Chaucer over other, more typically medieval writers. Scholars beholden to more traditional readings of late medieval poetry have been critical of Utz's perhaps too broad application of the paradigm.

=== Medievalism studies ===
Utz's second area of specialization is Medievalism Studies, the reception of medieval literature, language, and culture in postmedieval times. One of his additions to this research area is his 2002 study, Chaucer and the Discourse of German Philology, which surveys the reception of Geoffrey Chaucer among German scholars and which the reviewer for Germany's daily, Süddeutsche Zeitung, called an "academic thriller." "Simply for its overview of German scholarship on Chaucer," John M. Hill stated, "this book is invaluable, a mother-lode of information and a reminder to many of us that Old and Middle English scholarship as we learned it forty or more years ago is deeply indebted to nineteenth-century German academics and school teachers (even for the first categorizations of language history into old, middle, and modern)." However, perhaps more important than the bio-bibliographic detail, the study demonstrates how (German) philology, rather than being sine ira et studio, was intimately involved with the goals of Germany as an increasingly aggressive nation state. In fact, Utz demonstrates how Germany's actual territorial incursions into Africa, China, and Alsace-Lorraine could be seen as quite similar to German philologists' colonization of academic space via rather bellicose research agendas and methodologies. Finally, Utz provides hitherto unknown information about the scholarship and relationships among some of the most productive medievalists in the German-speaking and Anglo-American world: A.C. Baugh, Henry Bradshaw, Alois Brandl, Ernst Robert Curtius, Ewald Flügel, Frederick James Furnivall, Eugen Kölbing, Wilhelm Hertzberg, Johann August Hermann (John) Koch, Hugo Lange, Victor Langhans, Arnold Schröer, Walter W. Skeat, Bernhard Ten Brink, and Julius Zupitza. More recently, Utz's work has focused on questions of the semantic history of "medievalism" as well as issues of temporality and technology.

Collaborating first with Leslie J. Workman and Kathleen Verduin, later with Tom Shippey, Elizabeth Emery, Gwendolyn Morgan, Ed Risden, and Karl Fugelso, Utz shaped the work of the International Society for the Study of Medievalism, as whose President he served from 2009 to 2020.

=== The Manifesto ===
In 2017, Utz published Medievalism: A Manifesto as the inaugural volume in the ARC Humanities Press book series "Past Imperfect". Looking back at his career in medieval studies and medievalism, Utz set out to reform the way he and his colleagues think about and practice their academic engagement with medieval culture. His goal is to convince medievalists to abandon their academic habit of communicating exclusively with each other and rather to reconnect with the general public. Paul Sturtevant welcomed the volume as a "much-needed call-to-arms to those medievalists still on the fence about working for, among, and with the public" and recommends it become "required reading for every medieval studies Ph.D., and taped to the door of many a public history professor." Jan Alexander von Nahl, similarly, finds value in Utz' "holding up a mirror to his own discipline" by harnessing the "productive uncertainty" of the field of medievalism studies. Ryan Harper, in Medievally Speaking, describes the value of the volume more critically, claiming that "some of the more pointed comments about the nature of the profession (particularly those about the “protection of tenure” and the “protective ivory tower walls”) seem to have been written by someone occupying a very comfortable chair" and that the arguments made suffer from too much "brevity and concision".

=== Bruce Chatwin ===
Utz is an expert on British essayist, journalist, art connoisseur, globetrotter, and novelist Bruce Chatwin (1940–1989), publishing entries in the Literary Encyclopedia on all of Chatwin's books, including (in what Peter McLachlin called "a Borgesian coincidence") on Chatwin's 1989 novella, Utz, and reading On the Black Hill (1982) as an example of Utopian autobiografiction.

=== Academic leadership ===
Utz has published articles on academic leadership issues, discussing nepotism during faculty hires, diversity and inclusion in administrative hires, tenure and promotion, traditional notions of English departments and the humanities, isolationist tendencies in the German academy, jargon in Strategic Planning, open access to scholarship, and holistic notions of education based on partnerships between arts, humanities, and STEM disciplines. He is critical of disciplinary silos, finds synergies between the humanities and social sciences on the one hand, and engineering, computing, and the natural sciences on the other, and favors the public humanities. He has contributed to The Public Medievalist and medievalists.net, blogs that focus on lowering the drawbridge between the academic study of and the non-academic interest in medieval culture. For the School of Literature, Media, and Communication at Georgia Tech, he has edited Humanistic Perspectives in a Technological World, a collection of essays negotiating the integration of arts, humanities, and social sciences disciplines and approaches at an institution focused on science and technology.

== Select publications ==
- Richard Utz, Medievalism: A Manifesto. Leeds and Bradford: ARC Humanities Press, 2017.
- Richard Utz and Karen Head, eds., Humanistic Perspectives in a Technological World, 2021. 2nd edn.
- Elizabeth Emery & Richard Utz, eds., Medievalism: Key Critical Terms. Cambridge, 2014; paperback edn. 2017.
- R. Utz, “Beating the bottom line: Is language instruction doomed to fail?” UniversityBusiness, 2024.
- R. Utz, “Why STEM needs the humanities—and vice versa.” UniversityBusiness (podcast), 2024.
- R. Utz, “Administrative Hiring and your Institutional Brand.” Inside Higher Ed, 2024.
- R. Utz, “Milton’s Last Stand, in Florida.” Insider Higher Ed, 2024.
- R. Utz, “Making the Most of External Review Letters.” Inside Higher Ed, 2024.
- R. Utz, “Taking Umbridge with Associate Deans.” Inside Higher Ed, 2023.
- R. Utz, “On Chaucer Studies, ‘Raptus,’ and Relevance.” Inside Higher Ed, 2022.
- R. Utz, “For tenure to survive, academics must take peer reviewing seriously.” Times Higher Education, 2022.
- R. Utz, “Integrating STEM and the Humanities.” Inside Higher Ed, 2022.
- R. Utz, “Anatomy of an Academic Genre: Chair’s Letter for Tenure & Promotion,” Inside Higher Ed, 2020.
- R. Utz, “Against Adminspeak.” Chronicle of Higher Education, 2020.
- R. Utz, “Whose (Medieval) Congress Is It Anyway?” Inside Higher Ed, 2018.
- R. Utz, “Game of Thrones Among the Medievalists.” Inside Higher Ed, 2017.
- R. Utz, “The Diversity Question and Administrative-Job Interviews.” Chronicle of Higher Education, 2017.
