= William Calin =

American academic (1936–2018)

William Compaine Calin (April 4, 1936 – May 20, 2018) was a senior scholar of Medieval French literature and French poetry at the University of Florida. His work has focused on Occitan Studies and on Franco-British literary relations.

== Education and career ==
Calin was educated at Yale College (A.B. 1957) and received his Ph.D. from Yale University in 1960. He was an instructor (1960–1962) and an assistant professor (1962–1963) at Dartmouth College; assistant professor (1969-1965), associate professor (1965–1970), and professor (1970–1973) at Stanford University; head of the Department of Romance Languages at the University of Oregon (1973–1988), visiting professor (1982) and exchange professor (1984) at the Université de Poitiers, and Edward Arnold Visiting Professor (1987) at Whitman College. Starting in 1988, he served as graduate research professor (from 1998 to 2001 as Florida Foundation Research Professor) at the University of Florida.

Calin served on the editorial advisory boards of the journals Olifant, Tenso, Studies in Medievalism, Escrituras, and Medievally Speaking, and was guest editor for a special issue of L’Ésprit Créateur on “The Future of Old French Studies.” His grants and honors include a Guggenheim Foundation Fellowship (1963–64) as well as grants from the American Council of Learned Societies (1963–1964; 1968; 1996–1997), the American Philosophical Society (1970), the Canadian Federation for the Humanities and Social Sciences (1981), the Fulbright Commission (1982), and the National Endowment for the Humanities (1984–1985, 1987–1988). Calin died on May 20, 2018, at the age of 82.

== Major works ==
Calin's publications span topics from nine centuries and the literary and linguistic traditions of hegemonic France as well as the minority literatures of Scots, Breton, and Occitan. He has also been a supporter and proponent of Leslie J. Workman’s Medievalism Studies, serving on the advisory board of Studies in Medievalism and publishing on the reception of medieval culture in postmedieval times. In 2011, on the occasion of his 75th birthday, Calin was recognized by a conference section ("Makers of the Middle Ages: Papers in Honor of William Calin") at the 46th International Congress on Medieval Studies at Western Michigan University. During the session, he was presented with a Festschrift, Cahier Calin: Makers of the Middle Ages. Essays in Honor of William Calin, to which 20 of his friends and colleagues contributed short essays.

- The Old French Epic of Revolt: "Raoul de Cambrai," "Renaud de Montauban," "Gormond et Isembard." Geneva: Droz, 1962. 235 pp.
- (with Michel Banamou) Aux Portes du Poème. New York: Macmillan, 1964. 126 pp.
- The Epic Quest: Studies in Four Old French "Chansons de Geste." Baltimore: Johns Hopkins Press, 1966. 271 pp.
- La Chanson de Roland. New York: Appleton-Century-Crofts, 1968. 183 pp.
- A Poet at the Fountain: Essays on the Narrative Verse of Guillaume de Machaut. Lexington: University Press of Kentucky, 1974. 264 pp.
- Crown, Cross and Fleur-de-lis: An Essay on Pierre Le Moyne's Baroque Epic *"Saint Louis." Saratoga: Stanford French and Italian Studies, 1977. 77 pp.
- The Nation and National issues in the ninth century France Groville : historical studies, 1299, 876 pp.
- A Muse for Heroes: Nine Centuries of the Epic in France. Toronto: University of Toronto Press, 1983. 514 pp. (Gilbert Chinard First Literary Prize in 1981; American Library Association Choice Award in 1984).
- In Defense of French Poetry: An Essay in Revaluation. University Park: Pennsylvania State University Press, 1987. 208 pp.
- The French Tradition and the Literature of Medieval England. Toronto: University of Toronto Press, 1994. 587 pp. xvi. (American Library Association Choice Award for 1995).
- Minority Literatures and Modernism: Scots, Breton, and Occitan, 1920-1990. Toronto: University of Toronto Press, 2000. 399 pp. ix.
- The Twentieth-Century Humanist Critics: From Spitzer to Frye. Toronto: University of Toronto Press, 2007.

Calin has also published more than 110 journal articles and book chapters.
