= Sir Hugh (disambiguation) =

"Sir Hugh" is a traditional British folk song.

Sir Hugh may also refer to the following people:

- Sir Hugh Acland, 5th Baronet, 17th century English MP
- Hugh Allan, Canadian financier and shipowner
- Hugh Annesley (police officer), Northern Irish police officer
- Hugh Arbuthnot (British Army officer), British soldier and politician
- Hugh Trenchard, 1st Viscount Trenchard, British airman and soldier
- Sir Hugh O'Donnell, Sixteenth-century Irish nobleman
