= John Ruskin (disambiguation) =

John Ruskin (1819–1900) was an English writer and art critic in the Victorian era.

John Ruskin may also refer to:

- John Ruskin (Millais), a portrait by Millais of the art critic
- John Ruskin College, a further education college in Croydon, London (superseded John Ruskin Grammar School, John Ruskin High School)
- Nardwuar (born John Ruskin, 1968), eccentric Canadian journalist and musician
