= Leslie J. Workman =

British academic (1927–2001)

Leslie J. Workman (5 March 1927 in Hanwell, London, England – 1 April 2001 in Grand Rapids, Michigan, US) was an independent scholar and founder of academic medievalism.

== Biography ==
Workman received his education at the Russell School, London, studied at King's College London (B.A. in history), and then served in the British Army in Egypt, Palestine, and Sudan from 1945 to 1948. In 1954 he emigrated to the United States and studied history at Columbia University and Ohio State University. Later he taught at Queens College of The City University of New York in New York City, Muhlenberg College in Allentown, Pennsylvania, and Western College for Women in Oxford, Ohio. In 1983 he married Kathleen Verduin, a professor of American literature at Hope College in Holland, Michigan.

== Achievements ==
Workman's original contribution to the academy is the establishing of a network of scholars who studied the reception of medieval culture in post medieval times. Although without academic appointment since the early 1980s, he managed to convince numerous colleagues of the value of the paradigm of medievalism studies. He began to organize the first conference sections on the topic in 1971 at the International Congress on Medieval Studies at Western Michigan University (Kalamazoo, Michigan), founded the leading academic journal, Studies in Medievalism, in 1979, and started the annual International Conference on Medievalism in 1986. In 1998, colleagues and students recognized his extraordinary achievements with a Festschrift, Medievalism in the Modern World: Essays in Honour of Leslie J. Workman, edited by Tom Shippey and Richard Utz.

=== Studies in Medievalism ===
Workman founded Studies in Medievalism (SiM) in 1979 as the only academic journal dedicated entirely to the study of post-medieval images and perceptions of the Middle Ages. Initially privately published (1979–1990), it was adopted by Boydell & Brewer Publishers in Cambridge, UK. After Workman's death, the publication was edited by Tom Shippey of St. Louis University. It is currently edited by Karl Fugelso at Towson University. As was Workman's original intention, the journal welcomes articles on both scholarly and popular works, with particular interest in the interaction between scholarship and re-creation.

=== The Year's Work in Medievalism ===
Workman originally conceived of The Year's Work in Medievalism (YWIM) as a publishing venue not only for the Proceedings of the annual International Conference on Medievalism, but also for comprehensive field bibliographies, book reviews, and announcements of conferences and other events. However, it became mostly an outlet for shorter essays based on conference presentations. Since 2020, the journal has been made available online. And some volumes are available elsewhere. Gwendolyn Morgan, Montana State University, served as general editor for the proceedings series for many years. Since 2011, E. L. Risden (St. Norbert College), M.J. Toswell, Karl Fugelso, and Richard Utz (Georgia Tech) have served as editors. The current editors are Valerie B. Johnson and Renée Ward.

=== International Conference ===
Workman founded the annual International Conference on Medievalism (ICOM; known as the General Conference on Medievalism until 1993) with two meetings at the University of Notre Dame (Notre Dame, Indiana) in 1986 and 1987. Subsequent conferences were organized through the Newberry Library and Northeastern Illinois University (Chicago, IL: 1988), the United States Military Academy (1989), Castle Kaprun (jointly with the 5th Symposium on Mittelalter-Rezeption, Austria: 1990), the University of Delaware (1991), the University of South Florida (1992), the University of Leeds (UK: 1993), Montana State University (Bozeman, MT: 1994), the Higgins Armory Museum (Worcester, MA: 1995), Kalamazoo College (Kalamazoo, MI: 1996), Christ Church College (Canterbury, UK: 1997), University of Rochester (Rochester, NY: 1998), Montana State University (1999), Hope College (Holland, MI: 2000), Buffalo State College (Buffalo, NY: 2001), the University of Northern Iowa (Cedar Falls, IA: 2002), St. Louis University (St. Louis, MO: 2003), University of New Brunswick (Canada: 2004), Towson University (Baltimore, MD: 2005), Ohio State University (Columbus, OH: 2006), University of Western Ontario (London, ON, Canada: 2007), Wesleyan College (Macon, GA: 2008), Siena College (Loudonville, NY: 2009), the University of Groningen (Groningen, Netherlands: 2010); and the University of New Mexico (Albuquerque, NM: 2012); Kent State University Regional Campuses (Warren and Canton, Ohio, 2012); St. Norbert College (De Pere, Wisconsin, 2013); Georgia Institute of Technology (Atlanta, Georgia, 2014); Washington and Jefferson College (Pittsburgh, Pennsylvania, 2015); Bamberg University (Bavaria, Germany, 2016); University of Salzburg (Salzburg, Austria, 2017); Brock University (St. Catharines, Ontario, Canada, 2018); Georgia Institute of Technology (Atlanta, Georgia, 2019); Old Dominion University (Norfolk, Virginia, 2020); Delta College (Michigan, 2021).

== Select publications ==
- "Medievalism." In: The Arthurian Encyclopedia, ed. Norris J. Lacy. New York: Garland, 1985. pp. 387–91.
- "Medievalism and Romanticism." In: Poetica. 39-40 (1994), 1-34.
- "Medievalism Today." In: Medieval Feminist Forum. 23/1 (1997), 29–33.
- Studies in Medievalism, 1979–1999. (Ed.)

== Literature ==
- William Calin: "Leslie Workman: A Speech of Thanks," in: Richard Utz and Tom Shippey (eds.): Medievalism in the Modern World. Essays in Honour of Leslie Workman. Turnhout: Brepols, 1998. pp. 451–52.
- Richard Utz: "Medievalism in the Making: A Bibliography of Leslie J. Workman," in: The Year's Work in Medievalism 15 (2001), 127–31.
- Richard Utz: "Medievalism," in: Robert Bjork (ed.): Oxford Dictionary of the Middle Ages (Oxford: Oxford University Press, 2010), vol. III, pp. 1118–1119.
- Richard Utz: "Coming to Terms with Medievalism: Toward a Conceptual History." European Journal of English Studies 15.2 (2011): 101–13.
- Kathleen Verduin: "The Founding and the Founder: Medievalism and the Legacy of Leslie J. Workman," Studies in Medievalism 17 (2009).
- Kathleen Verduin: "Remembering Leslie J. Workman (1927–2001)," in: Anne Lair and Richard Utz (eds.): Falling into Medievalism , Special edition: UNIversitas: The University of Northern Iowa Journal of Research, Scholarship, and Creative Activity, 2006.
