= Sir Hugh =

Traditional song

"Sir Hugh", also known as "The Jew's Daughter" or "The Jew's Garden", is a traditional British folk song, Child ballad No. 155, Roud No. 73, a folkloric example of a blood libel. The original texts are not preserved, but the versions written down from the 18th century onwards show a clear relationship with the 1255 accusations of the murder of Little Saint Hugh of Lincoln by Jews in Lincoln, making it likely that the known versions derive from compositions made around that time.

The title is a corruption of "Little Saint Hugh". (Note: The sobriquet "little" was used to stop confusion with Saint Hugh, Bishop of Lincoln. "Little Saint Hugh" was never officially canonised.)

== Synopsis ==
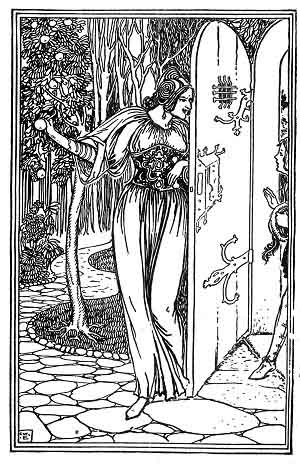
The "Jew's daughter" lures Hugh into her garden. Illustration to Sir Hugh by George Wharton Edwards (1896)

Some boys are playing with a ball, in Lincoln. They accidentally throw it over the wall of a Jew's house (or castle). The daughter of the Jew comes out, dressed in green, and beckons to a boy to come in to fetch it. He replies that he cannot do this without his playmates. She entices him in with fruit and a gold ring. Once he has sat down on a throne, she stabs him in the heart "like a sheep". There is much blood.

When the boy fails to come home, his mother concludes that he is skylarking. She sets out to find him, with a rod to beat him. From beyond the grave, the boy asks his mother to prepare a funeral winding sheet, and that he is "asleep". In some versions he asks that if his father calls for him, the father is to be told that he is "dead". In some versions the boy's corpse shines "like gold". In some versions the Jew's daughter catches the blood in a basin and puts a prayer book at his head and a bible at his feet.

== Background ==
The Life and Miracles of St William of Norwich (1173) popularised the medieval accusation against Jews of ritual murder based on the murder of William of Norwich (1144). Henry III's (r. 1216–1272) court purchased and abused Jewish loans to acquire land from less well off barons and knights, causing many to blame Jews for their insecurity. In the 1230s, some English towns expelled Jews, and organised violence against Jews took place in the 1260s.

The death of Little Saint Hugh of Lincoln (1255) falls into this period. The facts of the original story are obscure. An admission of ritual killing was extracted from a Jew named Copin by John Lexington, a member of the Royal court and the brother of the Bishop of Lincoln. The Bishop stood to gain greatly from the establishment of a cult of martyrdom, as it would attract pilgrims and donations. The King intervened, executed the man who had confessed and ordered the arrest of a further 90 Jews. Eighteen were hanged for refusing to take part in the trial, while the remainder were later pardoned.

Because of the intervention of the King, the story became well known and gained credibility. The contemporaneous chronicler Matthew Paris (d. 1259) mentions the story. The story also appears in Annals of Waverley. The Paris version of events was drawn on by Chaucer. Elements of the Paris and Chaucer versions of the story can be found in some versions of the ballad. It is likely that the earliest versions were composed close to the time of the events.

== Textual variants and analysis ==
The song has been found in England, Scotland, Canada, the US and, to a lesser extent, Ireland. (Note: "This song was collected in England and Scotland and was even more common in North America, but less well known in Ireland.") It was still popular in the early 19th century.

There is an Anglo-Norman ballad (medieval French), likely composed while Henry III was still alive and probably with knowledge of the city of Lincoln. (Note: The full text of the Norman French ballad can be found in Jacobs 1893, pp. 125–30) This version may contain the main elements of the original English song, many of which were lost in the later versions, which were written down in the 18th century and later. It is possible to relate elements in the older versions to the medieval stories; attempts to reconstruct the probable content of the original have been made. (Note: McCabe proposes the content of the original ballad as follows: "Hugh is enticed from his playmates into a Jew's house, crucified and stabbed, bleeding profusely. His heart is eaten. A Christian nurse throws his corpse into a well. Hugh's mother searches and makes fruitless inquiries of the Jews. A woman (his mother?) finds Hugh's body in the well. The corpse recounts the murder, and after miraculous rejection from the well, is buried with great solemnity in the Cathedral.")

Paris has a Latin fragment of the ballad in his Chronicle. Thomas Percy's Reliques (1783) has a version from Scotland. David Herd (1776) had a version, and so did Robert Jameison (1806). McCabe says that the "earliest texts of Sir Hugh are Scottish ... [and] preserve the medieval saint's legend in its most coherent form."

The song may also incorporate elements of other medieval antisemitic texts, particularly a miracle story also drawn on by Chaucer in the Prioress' Tale that features Jews murdering a child, often a school child, that habitually sings an anthem near where they live, and throw the body into their privy. These elements occur in some of the early versions of Sir Hugh.

The known versions have lost many of the elements of the original story, or have simplified them over time. For instance, the original takes place near a castle, while this becomes a castle belonging to a Jew. The well near a castle becomes a private well set in the castle gardens. The location "Merry Lincoln" becomes garbled, and dropped. (Note: For instance, "Mirry-land toune") The game becomes a ball game. The element of crucifixion is lost. The timing of the events is sometimes preserved as midsummer, sometimes altered to Easter. The role of the mother in warning against associating with the Jews, and later accusing the Jews, is simplified and dropped. (In some versions she becomes a disciplinarian figure and eventually even becomes the murderess.) Miraculous elements such as bells ringing without hands are dropped. The funeral element disappears, and the number of characters reduced.

New elements, such as rain or mist, are added, some including references to Scotland, implying that the ballad may have travelled back into England from Scotland. Stanzas from Robin Hood's Death are incorporated. Some of the later versions, particularly the American texts known as The Jew's Garden, incorporate elements of another song about child murder, Lamkin.

Nevertheless, McCabe concludes that the most persistent element in Sir Hugh is the anti-semitic element: "despite the expulsion of the Jews from England in 1290 … with its consequence that many ballad singers knew no Jews, reference to a Jewish murderess is almost always preserved."

Roud and Bishop make a similar point:

The subject matter … is disturbing, and reminds us that folklore is not always nice and cosy. Indeed, racists, xenophobes, political zealots and religious fundamentalists have always used legends, rumours, songs, jokes and other lore to support and spread their beliefs and to indoctrinate their young, and in particular to denigrate and stereotype outsiders and the victims of their bigotry.

Karl Heinz Göller gives a different view of the origins and resonances of the ballad. Like McCabe, he traces changes showing that the form of the elements are simplified. For Göller, one side of the ballad is a fairy tale, onto which anti-semitic elements have been added, and at later dates, dropped and forgotten. Thus Sir Hugh is in his opinion a "symbolic story", of temptation and sexual deflowering. He details how the anti-semitic elements are largely dropped in the American versions, and even the violence is removed, as the ballad in some cases becomes a nursery rhyme. He speculates that a version existed prior to its merger with the Hugh of Lincoln story, which "must have been similar to the Frog Prince tale in respect to love and the introduction to its mysteries". (Note: "In the process of oral transmission nearly all anti-Semitic motifs disappear, most of all in America. Whether or not they belong to the original popular ballad will remain controversial. There are good reasons to assume that the first versions had nothing to do with ritual murder or with the opposition of Christians and Jews, but that they basically dealt with an initiation story. It must have been similar to the Frog Prince tale in respect to love and the introduction to its mysteries. Sexuality is expressed symbolically by means of aggression, cruelty, injury, murder and death, but always in a way that does not disguise the basic reference to the sexual act.")

Göller points to James Joyce as a figure who recognised the tension between the symbolic story and the anti-Semitic tale. In Ulysses, Stephen and his host debate an Irish version of the song. Stephen "regards the ballad as a parable of human fate. Hugh challenges his fate once through carelessness, twice through premeditation. Fate appears in the person of the Jewish girl, who, as an incarnation of Hope and Youth, allures him into a secret chamber, and kills him like a sacrificial animal." On the other hand, his host remembers the accusations of ritual murder, "the incitation of the hierarchy, the superstition of the populace, the propagation of rumour in continued fraction of veridicity, the envy of opulence, the influence of retaliation, the sporadic reappearance of atavistic delinquency, the mitigating circumstances of fanaticism, hypnotic suggestion and somnambulis".

Given the tension between the story of Hugh, murdered by Jews, and the symbolic story that Göller describes, he concludes that the "introduction of details from the Hugh of Lincoln story is thus in all probability a secondary phenomenon. It is very difficult to say when the amalgamation took place. Events such as the discovery of the bones of the murdered little boy in Lincoln Minster could have been a catalyst. But it is more likely that the anti-Semitism of a part of the ballads and the localization in Lincoln is a kind of euhemerist contamination similar to the Prioress's Tale, which gave rise to associations with the Hugh of Lincoln story through the similarity of its subject matter. Most of these anti-Semitic details have disappeared in the course of oral tradition, because they were no longer understood."

=== Other parallels ===
Some of the ideas in the extant versions have parallels elsewhere. For instance, the idea of a corpse speaking (sending thoughts) to the living occurs in the ballad The Murder of Maria Marten, The Cruel Mother (Child 20) and in The Unquiet Grave (Child 78). Gruesome killings are quite common in Child ballads.

== Controversy ==
Victorian collectors were surprised to find evidence of a ballad featuring a blood libel, and two wrote books on the subject. James Orchard Halliwell wrote Ballads and Poems Respecting Hugh of Lincoln in 1849. In the same year, and unknown to Halliwell, Abraham Hume wrote the book Sir Hugh of Lincoln, or, an Examination of a Curious Tradition respecting the Jews, with a notice of the Popular Poetry connected with it.

One of the earliest professional recordings of the song was by A. L. Lloyd on "The English and Scottish Popular Ballads Vol 2" in 1956, produced by Kenneth Goldstein, himself a Jew. Another interpreter of the song, Ewan MacColl, described the ballad as "the barbaric functioning of medieval thinking".

It is still a controversial topic as to whether it is something that should be performed or recorded; and if it is, whether it is reasonable to remove the anti-Semitic elements. (Note: See discussions on Mudcat Café, for example.) The 1975 version recorded by Steeleye Span, for instance, removes these references entirely.

== Music ==
Edward Francis Rimbault printed a version of the ballad in his Musical Illustrations of Bishop Percy's Reliques of Ancient English Poetry of 1850.

=== Recordings ===
Album/Single	Performer	Year	Variant	Notes
Fatal Flower Garden (Victor Records, 78 rpm)	Nelstone's Hawaiians	1930	Fatal Flower Garden	The earliest known professional recording; re-issued in 1952 on the Anthology of American Folk Music
Herbert Halpert recording	Lydia Gyderson	1937	Jew Garden	The earliest known field recording
The English and Scottish Popular Ballads vol 3	A. L. Lloyd	1956	Sir Hugh	
The Max Hunter Folksong Collection	Mrs. Allie Long Parker	1958	The Jew's Garden	
Southern Journey, Vol. 7: Ozark Frontier	Ollie Gilbert	1959	It Rained a Mist	
The Max Hunter Folksong Collection	Fran Majors	1959	The Jew's Garden	
The Folksongs Of Britain: The Child Ballads Vol. 2	Cecilia Costello	1961	The Jew's Garden	Reissue: Rounder CD Classic Ballads Of Britain & Ireland: Folk Songs Of England, Ireland, Scotland & Wales Vol. 2
The Long Harvest Vol 5	Ewan MacColl	1967	Sir Hugh	Four variants of the ballad: one English (Sir Hugh) and three American (The Fatal Flower Garden, Little Saloo, It Rained a Mist)
The Cock Doth Craw	Ian Campbell	1968	Little Sir Hugh	
Commoners Crown	Steeleye Span	1975	Little Sir Hugh	
The Muckle Sangs (Scottish Tradition 5)	Margaret Stewart	1975	Sir Hugh & the Jew's Daughter	
Shreds and Patches	John Kirkpatrick and Sue Harris	1977	Little Sir William	
Lost Lady Found	Vikki Clayton	1997	Sir Hugh of Lincoln	
The Swimming Hour	Andrew Bird's Bowl of Fire	2001	Fatal Flower Garden	
Heading for Home	Peggy Seeger	2003	Fatal Flower Garden	
Benjamin Britten: Folk Song Arrangements	Philip Langridge, Tenor, with Graham Johnson, Piano.	2005	Little Sir William	
The Harry Smith Project	Gavin Friday	2006	Fatal Flower Garden	Cover of the 1930 version by Nelstone's Hawaiians, as re-issued on the Harry Smith Anthology of American Folk Music
The Elixir That'll Fix 'Er	The Black Strap Molasses Family	2008	Fatal Flower Garden	
Deus Ignotus	Andrew King	2011	Sir Hugh	
Ground of its Own	Sam Lee	2012	The Jew's Garden	

== Sources ==
- Göller, Karl Heinz (1987). "Sir Hugh of Lincoln. From History to Nursery Rhyme". In Engler, Bernd; Müller, Kurt (eds.). Jewish Life and Jewish Suffering as Mirrored in English and American Literature (PDF). Schöningh: Paderborn. pp. 17–31.
- Halliwell-Phillipps, James Orchard (1849). Ballads and poems respecting Hugh of Lincoln, a boy alleged to have been murdered by the Jews in the year MCCLC. Brixton Hill.
- Hume, Abraham (1849). Sir Hugh of Lincoln, Or, An Examination of a Curious Tradition Respecting the Jews: With a Notice of the Popular Poetry Connected with it. John Russell Smith.
- Jacobs, Joseph (1904). "Hugh of Lincoln". In Singer, Isidore; et al. (eds.). The Jewish Encyclopedia. Vol. 6. New York: Funk & Wagnalls. p. 487.
- Jacobs, Joseph (1893). "Little St. Hugh of Lincoln. Researches in history, archæology, and legend". Transactions (Jewish Historical Society of England). 1: 89–135. JSTOR 29777550.
- Langmuir, Gavin I (1972). "The Knight's Tale of Young Hugh of Lincoln". Speculum. 47 (3): 459–482. doi:10.2307/2856155. JSTOR 2856155. S2CID 162262613.
- Rimbault, Edward F. (1850), Musical illustrations of Bishop Percy's Reliques of ancient English poetry, London: Cramer, Beale, OL 14776392M
- Stamper, Frances C; Jansen, Wm. Hugh (1958). ""Water Birch": An American Variant of "Hugh of Lincoln"". The Journal of American Folklore. 71 (279): 16–22. doi:10.2307/537953. JSTOR 537953.
- Roud, Steve; Bishop, Julia, eds. (2012). The New Penguin Book of Folk Songs. Penguin. p. 482. ISBN 978-0-141-19461-5.
- McCabe, Mary Diane (1980). A critical study of some traditional religious ballads (Masters). Durham University: Durham theses. pp. 277–292. See Chapter 11, The Survival of a Saint's Legend: Sir Hugh, or The Jew's Daughter (Child 155)
- Woodall, James (1955). "'Sir Hugh': A Study in Balladry". Southern Folklore Quarterly. 19: 77–84. hdl:2027/mdp.39015038728997.

== Primary sources ==
- The full text of Sir Hugh at Wikisource
- James Joyce (1922), Ulysses, London: Published for the Egoist Press, London by John Rodker, Paris, LCCN 23004811, OCLC 2297483, OL 6652730M
