= Wilhelm Hertzberg =

German philologist and translator

Wilhelm Hertzberg (* 6 June 1813 in Halberstadt; † 7 June 1879 in Bremen) was a prolific German philologist and translator.

== Biography ==
Hertzberg received his education at the Universities of Halle and Bonn. In 1858 he became director of a business school (Handelsschule) and in 1866, a principal of a high school (Gymnasium) in Bremen.

== Achievements ==
Hertzberg is principally known for preparing a widely known four volume edition of the Roman poet Sextus Aurelius Propertius ("De S. Aurelii Propertii Amicitiis et Amoribus"; Halle, 1843–1845). He also published translations of Propertius' poetry (Stuttgart, 1838); Babrius' fables (Halle, 1846); Vergil's poetry (Stuttgart, 1859); Plautus's comedies (Stuttgart, 1861); Tennyson's poetry (Dessau, 1853); and Chaucer's Canterbury Tales (Hildburghausen, 1866). His final work was an edition and translation of the Late medieval "Libell of englishe policye" (Leipzig, 1878).

== Literature ==
- D. Rohde: "Wilhelm Adolf Boguslav Hertzberg," in: Anglia 5 (1882), pp. 283–88. (eulogy)
- Richard Utz: Chaucer and the Discourse of German Philology (Brepols, Turnhout 2002), pp. 50–57. (on translation of Canterbury Tales)
