= Karl Heinz Göller =

German historian (1924–2009)

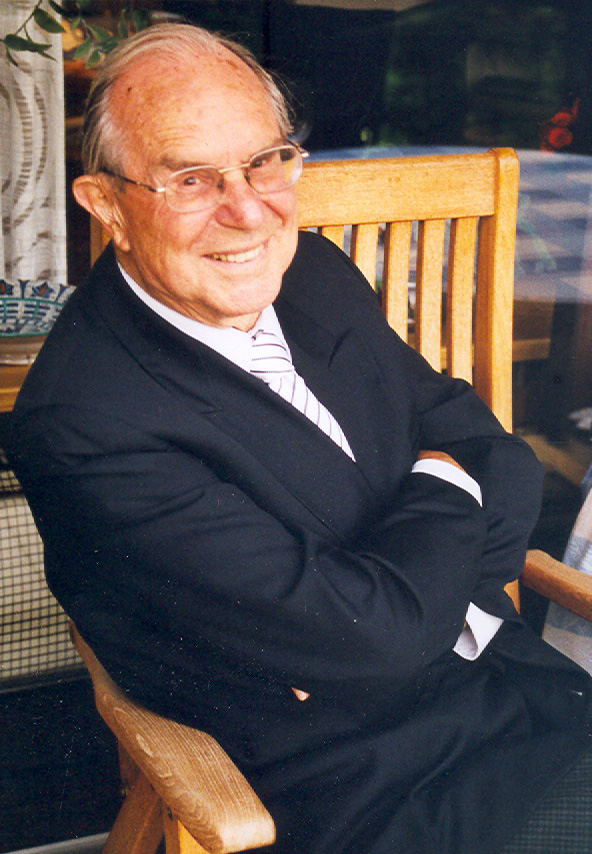
Karl Heinz Göller, ca. 2005

Karl Heinz Göller (1924–2009) was a noted German medievalist and founder of the Mediävistenverband, the German association for medieval studies.

== Biography ==
Karl Heinz Göller was born in Neheim-Hüsten (now Arnsberg) near Dortmund, Germany, in 1924. He served from 1942 as a signalman in the airforce and was a prisoner of war until 1945. After the war he studied English in Bonn, submitting a doctorate on the 18th-century poet James Thomson in 1955, and a Habilitation on English Arthurian literature in 1962. He taught at the Universities of Bonn and Göttingen before assuming the chair of British Literature at the University of Regensburg in 1967, a position he held until his retirement in 1992. In 1973 he served as president of the Deutscher Anglistenverband, a learned society for English scholars in Germany, and in 1983 he delivered the plenary at the International Congress on Medieval Studies at Western Michigan University.

Göller was the inspiration behind the founding of the Mediävistenverband, which he had imagined as a "Medieval Academy of Europe" parallel to the Medieval Academy of America, and was its president from its inception in 1983 until 1989. The same European vision lay behind his later connections with Eastern Europe: after the collapse of Communism, Göller championed the idea of recreating a Central European intellectual sphere, and in particular used his influence to support English studies in Poland.

From among his students, Uwe Böker, Renate Haas, Christoph Houswitschka, Anke Janssen, Franz Meier, and Richard Utz became leading researchers in the field of English and Medieval Studies.

Göller was widely admired for the number and range of his publications: six books and over 110 essays on topics as diverse as the Old English elegies, Chaucer, Shakespeare, Shelley, T. S. Eliot, Sylvia Plath, Ted Hughes, nursery rhymes and science fiction.

== Main publications ==
- König Arthur in der englischen Literatur des späten Mittelalters, Göttingen 1963.
- Epochen der englischen Lyrik, Düsseldorf 1970.
- Geschichte der altenglischen Literatur, Berlin 1971.
- Romance and Novel: Die Anfänge des englischen Romans, Regensburg 1972.

== Festschriften ==
Three collections of essays were published in Göller’s honour:

- Uwe Böker, Manfred Markus and Rainer Schöwerling (ed.), The Living Middle Ages: Studies in Mediaeval English Literature and Its Tradition: A Festschrift for Karl Heinz Göller, Regensburg 1989.
- Władysław Witalisz (ed.), And gladly wolde he lerne and gladly teche: Studies on Language and Literature in Honour of Professor Dr. Karl Heinz Göller, Kraków 2001.
- Uwe Böker (ed.), Of Remembraunce the Keye: Medieval Literature and Its Impact through the Ages: Festschrift for Karl Heinz Göller on the Occasion of his 80th Birthday, Frankfurt 2004.

A conference section in his honour was held at the International Congress on Medieval Studies in Kalamazoo in May 2010.
