= International Society for the Study of Medievalism =

International Society for Studies in Medievalism
- Abbreviation: ISSM
- Formation: 1979 (first issue of Studies in Medievalism)
- Founder: Leslie J. Workman

The International Society for the Study of Medievalism is an academic organization that exists to promote the interdisciplinary study of the popular and scholarly reception of the Middle Ages in postmedieval times. The Society is based on the work and studies of Leslie J. Workman (1927–2001), who is recognized as formalising the academic study of medievalism in the English-speaking world. Katheen Verduin collaborated with Workman for nearly 20 years (as Verduin notes, as "Associate Editor and wife, not necessarily in that order") to establish the Society and its peer-reviewed journal, Studies in Medievalism (SiM).

The Society additionally maintains an online journal for shorter articles, The Year's Work in Medievalism, and a review journal, Medievally Speaking edited by Richard Utz. They also organize annual conference sessions at the International Congress on Medieval Studies at Western Michigan University and the International Medieval Congress at the University of Leeds, and hold their own Annual International Conferences on Medievalism at institutions of higher education worldwide.

== Organisational aims ==
The work of ISSM is characterized as open to innovative and inclusive interdisciplinary scholarship. As Elena Levy-Navarro writes: "The Society has not restricted itself to a single definition of medievalism, and has, both by its calls for papers and by its acceptance and inclusion, encouraged academics to explore medievalism in such disparate phenomenon as the 'Celtic' tattoo, medieval gaming, and the early modern. Such an expansiveness that resists firm boundaries, and thus resists any efforts to develop a concrete field of specialty over which the academic can preside as expert is evident to the continued commitment of its members to electronic media that can provide (for those who can afford it) open access to its collective work, including its journal, Year’s Work in Medievalism, and its community-authored blog, Medievally Speaking. One need only consider the subtitle of this blog—'An Open Access Review Journal Encouraging Critical Engagement with the Continuing Process of Inventing the Middle Ages' (emphasis mine)—to see that the members insist on an openness, in which they critically engage—but not adjudicate—the 'continuing process of inventing the Middle Ages.'"

As founder, Workman insisted that "a sense of nostalgia for a lost past percolates throughout many medievalist endeavours", and he discussed "the connection between scholarship and medievalism, in that even academic studies of the Middle Ages become implicated with such nostalgia".

In 2017, the ISSM's president, Richard Utz, published a short monograph, Medievalism: A Manifesto, that embedded the subject of medievalism studies within the larger academic contexts of reception studies, feminism, gender studies, and medieval studies.

== Studies in Medievalism ==
Studies in Medievalism (SiM) is an annual publication that, as noted on its title page, "provides an interdisciplinary medium of exchange for scholars in all fields, including the visual and other arts, concerned with any aspect of the post-medieval idea and study of the Middle Ages and its influence, both scholarly and popular, of this study on Western society after 1500."

The series was founded in 1979 by Leslie J. Workman as an independent publication. The first issue of SiM featured a quote attributed to the British Victorian writer and Member of Parliament Lord Acton on its masthead:

"Two great principles divide the world, and contend for mastery, antiquity and the Middle Ages. These are two civilisations that have preceded us, and two elements of which ours is composed. All political as well as religious questions reduce themselves practically to this. This is the great dualism that runs through our society."

— Lord Acton, 1859

As Professor David Matthews notes, the statement has appeared on "every issue" of SiM since, and "argues for the pervasiveness of medievalism".

SiM now published by Boydell & Brewer, Ltd., and has been edited since 2006 by Karl Fugelso. Since 2009, each volume has begun with a series of 3,000-word, commissioned essays on such topics as "Defining Medievalism(s)," "Defining Neomedievalism(s)," and "Medievalism and the Corporation." The series is otherwise open to any paper that addresses medievalism in at least 6,000 words, and recent topics have ranged from representations of King Alfred in Charles Dickens' A Child's History of England to medievalist music in Peter Jackson's The Lord of the Rings films.

Studies in Medievalism does not publish reviews. All reviews of works, performances, or other cultural productions or political events that re-imagine or re-use the Middle Ages in postmedieval times are published in the journal's online review website Medievally Speaking.

== The Year's Work in Medievalism ==
The journal The Year's Work in Medievalism is currently edited by Valerie B. Johnson (Montevallo) and Renée Ward (Lincoln). Former editors include Edward L. Risden (St. Norbert College) and Richard Utz (Georgia Tech), Leslie J. Workman and Gwendolyn Morgan (Montana State University).

== International Society for the Study of Medievalism Conferences ==
ISSM conferences keynote speeches have been given by scholars and creative or cultural practitioners of medievalism, including Terry Jones, Ronald Hutton, and Verlyn Fleiger.
