= Thomas Carlyle (Millais) =

Painting by John Everett Millais

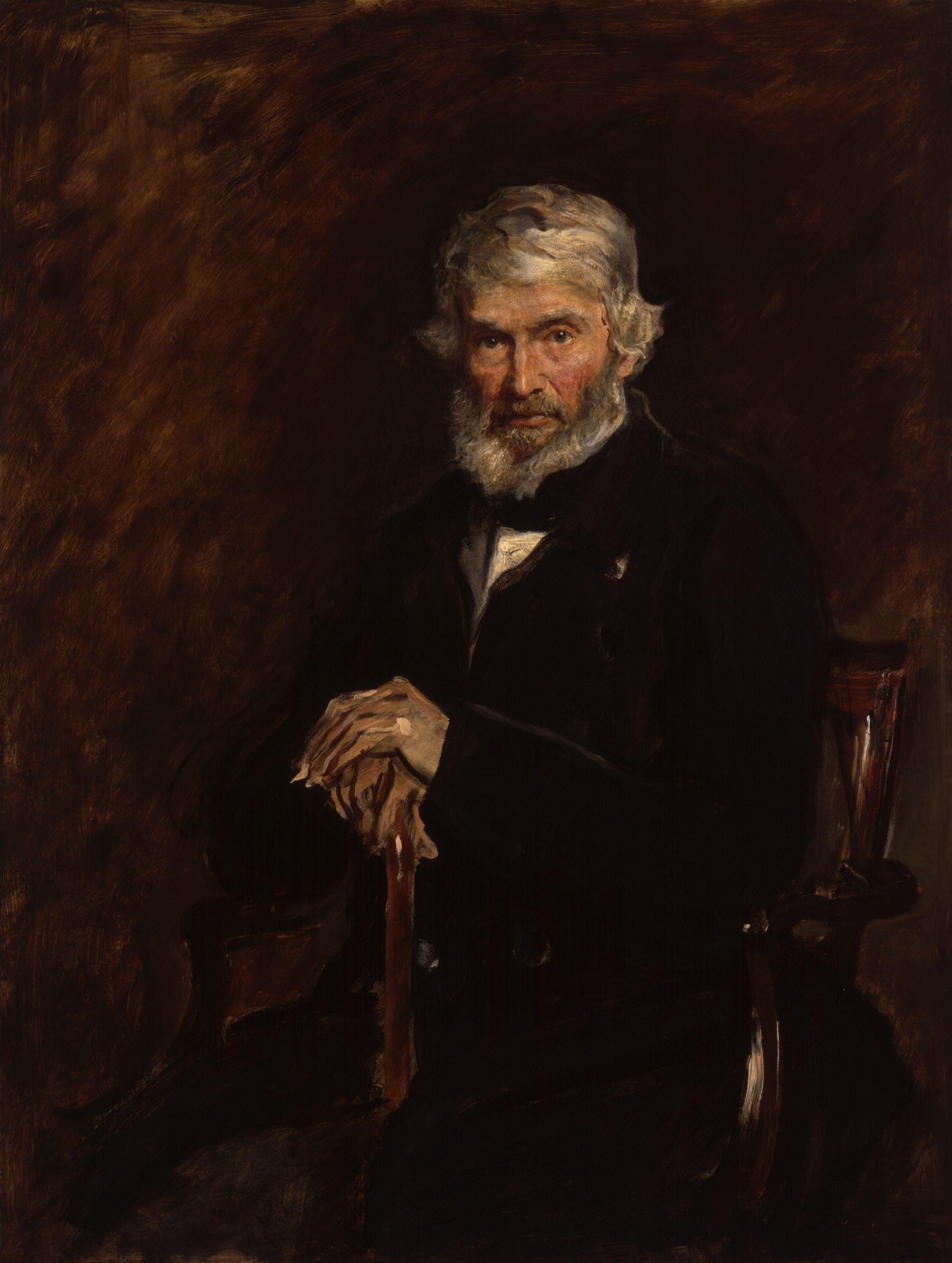
- Artist: John Everett Millais
- Year: 1877
- Catalogue: NPG 968
- Medium: Oil on canvas
- Subject: Thomas Carlyle
- Dimensions: 116.8 cm x 88.3 cm (46 in. x 34 3/4 in.)
- Location: National Portrait Gallery, London

Thomas Carlyle is an unfinished portrait of the Scottish essayist, historian and philosopher of the same name painted by English Pre-Raphaelite painter John Everett Millais in 1877.

== History ==
=== Composition, reception and provenance ===
Millais, who was said to boast of making £30,000 a year, taking four months' holiday, used to tell a story of Carlyle during those sittings. After he 'had had him twice', Carlyle turned round upon him on the 'great and glorious' staircase of his house and asked,—'Millais, did painting do all that?'

'Yes, painting did it all.'

'Well, there must be more fools in this world than I had thought!'

— D. A. Wilson and D. W. MacArthur, Carlyle in Old Age (1866–1881)

The earliest mention of the portrait comes from Carlyle's friend William Allingham, who recorded in his Diary on 11 April 1877: "Millais is to paint him." The first two sittings occurred on 26 and 28 May of that year. On 29 May, Carlyle wrote to his brother that "Millais seems to be in a state of almost frenzy about finishing with the extremest perfection his surprising and difficult task; evidently a worthy man." James Anthony Froude, who commissioned it, documented its progress:

In the second sitting I observed what seemed a miracle. The passionate vehement face of middle life had long disappeared. Something of the Annandale peasant had stolen back over the proud air of conscious intellectual power. The scorn, the fierceness was gone, and tenderness and mild sorrow had passed into its place. And yet under Millais's hands the old Carlyle stood again upon the canvas as I had not seen him for thirty years. The inner secret of the features had been evidently caught. There was a likeness which no sculptor, no photographer, had yet equalled or approached. Afterwards, I knew not how, it seemed to fade away.

As Froude alluded, Millais did not finish the portrait. James Caw recalled in 1928: "It used to be said, so an artist friend of Millais told me, that the cooling of the painter's ardour was due to the disparaging remarks of a lady who came with Carlyle to Millais's studio to see the picture." It may have been one Mrs. Anstruther, a friend of Carlyle's who visited Millais' home to see the portrait, telling him that it was "merely the mask; no soul, no spirit behind. I said it looked modern, and that in fact I did not like it." In a memorandum dated 30 November 1894, National Portrait Gallery trustee George Scharf recalled a story told to him by George Howard, 9th Earl of Carlisle: "A lady, unknown, came with Millais while he was painting Carlyle & looking at the picture said why you have not painted him as a philosopher or sage but as a rough - shire peasant. Millais laid down his palette and never touched the work afterwards."

It was left in the possession of Millais until it was purchased on 16 May 1885 by Millais' friend, Reginald Cholmondeley, who sold it to the National Portrait Gallery in 1894.

Carlyle commented, "The picture does not please many, nor, in fact, myself altogether, but it is surely strikingly like in every feature, and the fundamental condition was that Millais should paint what he was able to see." Alfred Lyttleton, upon meeting Carlyle, said that "His face was far finer than his pictures had led me to hope. Pathos was the most abiding characteristic." To which John Ruskin replied, in reference to the portrait, "Millais may represent the pathos of a moment, not of a life-time." Millais wrote to Scharf on 2 September 1894 after its purchase, "I rather think it a goodish portrait." In 1904, G. K. Chesterton compared it unfavourably to an earlier portrait by George Frederic Watts, in which Carlyle said he had been "made to look like a mad labourer." For Chesterton, "Watts' Carlyle is immeasurably more subtle and true than the Carlyle of Millais, which simply represents him as a shaggy, handsome, magnificent old man."

=== Damage ===
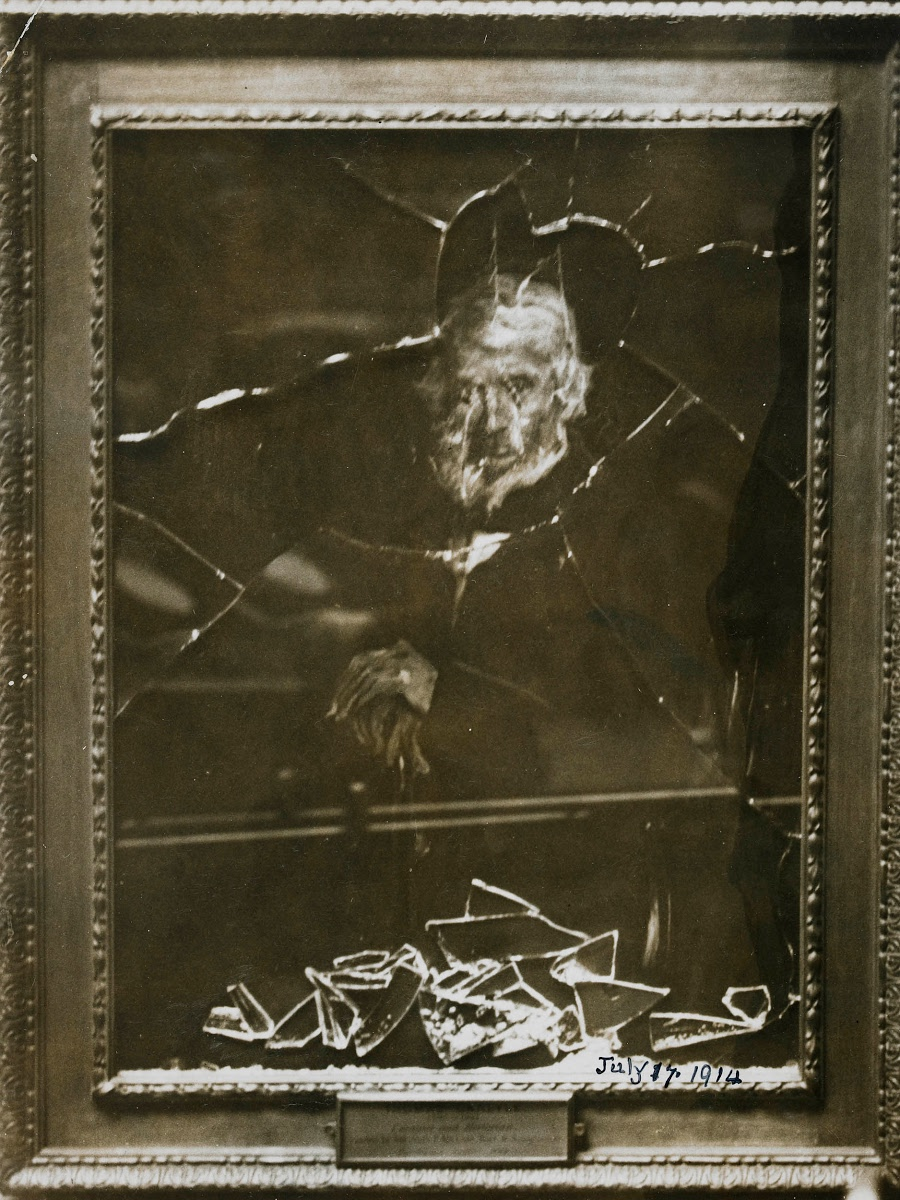
Photograph of damaged portrait

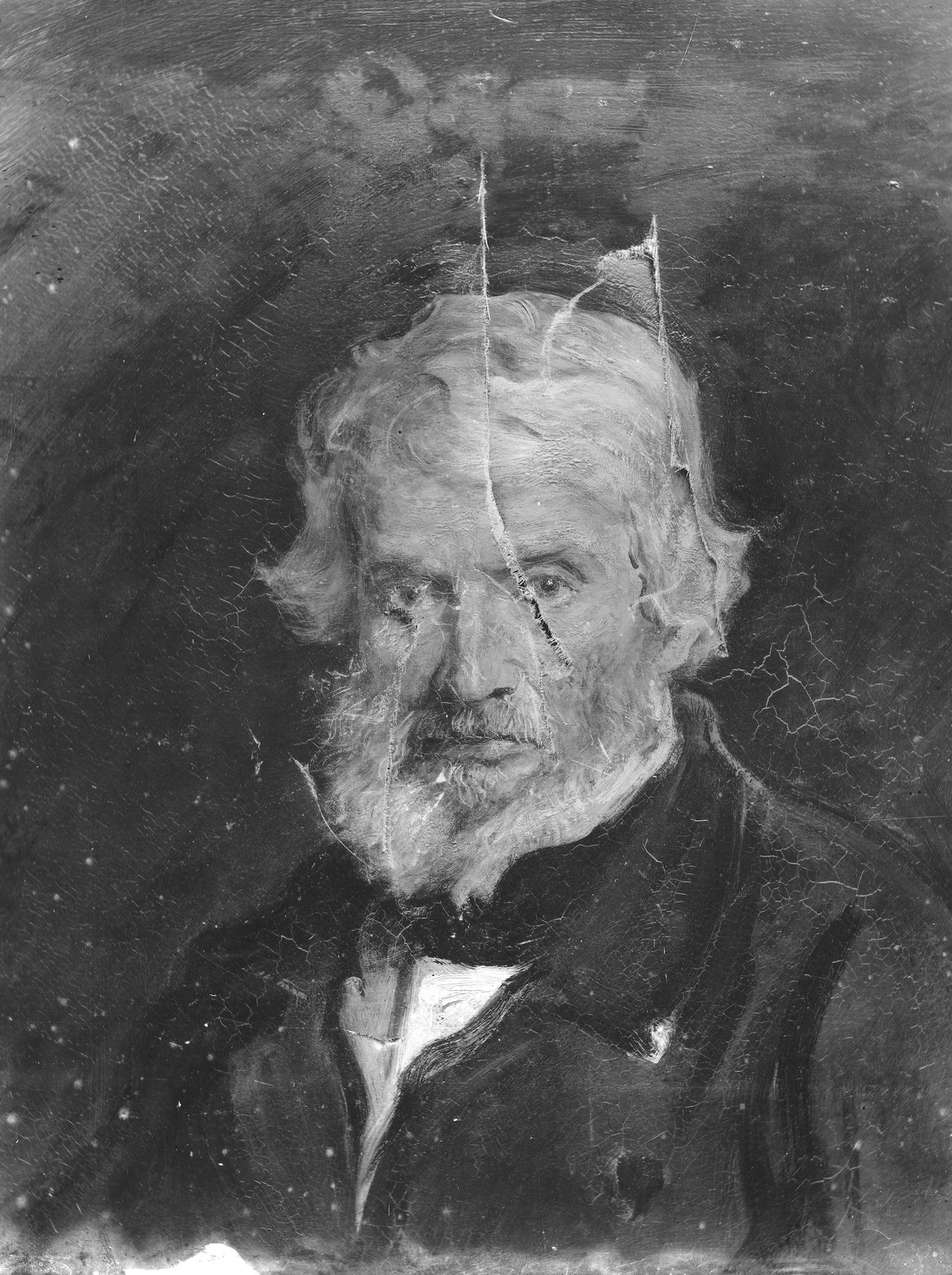
Detail of damage photographed by Emery Walker

On 17 July 1914, the portrait was slashed by American militant suffragette Anne Hunt in protest of Emmeline Pankhurst's arrest (Pankhurst herself was a great admirer of Thomas Carlyle). Director Sir Charles John Holmes left a written account.

On the day of the attack, students were not required to pay an entry fee. That morning, Attendant David Wilson recognised Anne Hunt, whom he had seen the previous day. He suspected that she was American "from the closeness from which she then examined the pictures." Wilson's suspicions were aroused because "no American would have paid the 6d entrance fee twice over." From his post, unable to follow her, he heard glass shatter. While two female students were copying portraits, Hunt struck Carlyle's portrait at least three times. One student, followed by an attendant, rushed to restrain her. Boston Evening Transcript reported that "the attendants had the greatest difficulty in preventing Miss Hunt from doing further damage. She struggled desperately, but eventually was secured and handed over to the police. She was bleeding profusely from cuts on her hands caused by the breaking of the glass." The damaged canvas remained on public view for the rest of the day, until Mr F. Haines, a restorer, noticed the work at five o'clock, and it was removed. The frame and broken glass were re-hung on the wall.

The press called Hunt a "Hatchet Fiend," "Wild Woman" and "Fury With a Chopper." A member of the public wrote to offer a replacement portrait of Carlyle. The Deputy Chairman of the Trustees reflected that despite efforts to safeguard the Collection, "we really are at the mercy of women who are determined." At her trial, Hunt declared, "This picture will be of added value and of great historical importance because it has been honoured by the attention of a Militant." She was sentenced to six months but only served six days.

The portrait along with a photograph of the damage was displayed as part of the National Portrait Gallery's Votes for Women display, which ran from 29 January to 13 May 2018 in commemoration of the Representation of the People Act centennial.

== See also ==
- List of paintings by John Everett Millais
- John Ruskin (Millais)
