= John Ruskin (Millais) =

Painting by John Everett Millais

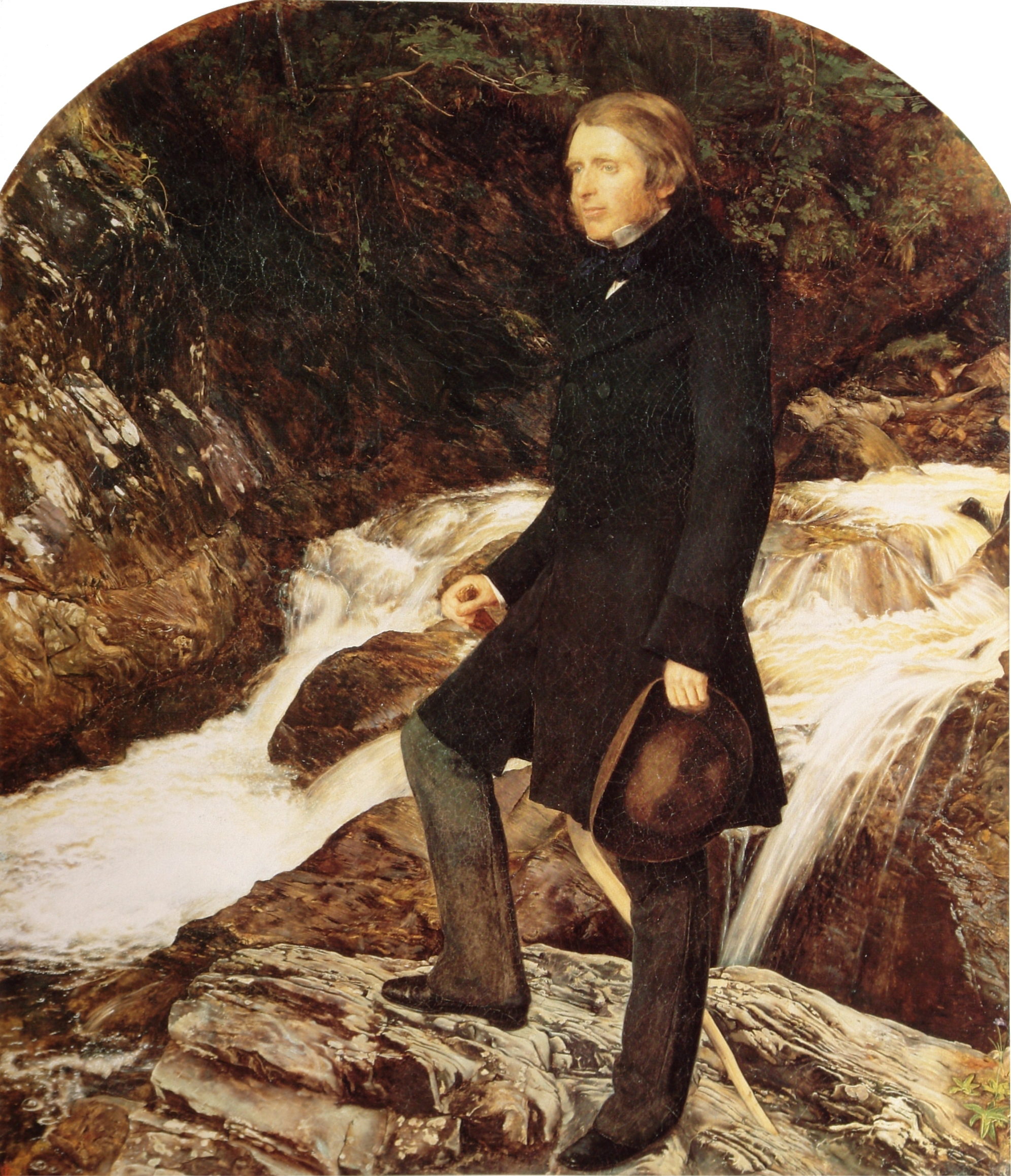
- Artist: John Everett Millais
- Year: 1853–1854
- Medium: Oil on canvas
- Dimensions: 78.7 cm × 68 cm (31.0 in × 27 in)
- Location: Ashmolean Museum; Oxford

John Ruskin is a portrait of the leading Victorian art critic John Ruskin (1819–1900). It was painted by the Pre-Raphaelite artist John Everett Millais (1829–1896) during 1853–54. John Ruskin was an early advocate of the Pre-Raphaelite group of artists, and part of their success was due to his efforts.

The painting depicts Ruskin in front of a waterfall in Glenfinlas, Scotland. Ruskin and Millais spent the summer of 1853 together at Glenfinlas in the Trossachs. Ruskin was especially interested in the rock formations and undertook his own studies of these.

== Creation ==
The Waterfall, showing Ruskin's wife Effie sitting by a waterfall at Glenfinlas, was a try-out for Millais' portrait of Ruskin, and was finished before work on the latter started on 28 July 1853.

The painting of Ruskin was started at Glenfinlas, where the details of the landscape were painted. The last stages of work on the painting were undertaken in Millais' studio in London. By that time, Effie had fallen in love with Millais. She left Ruskin and sued him for an annulment of the marriage. She and Millais were married the following year.

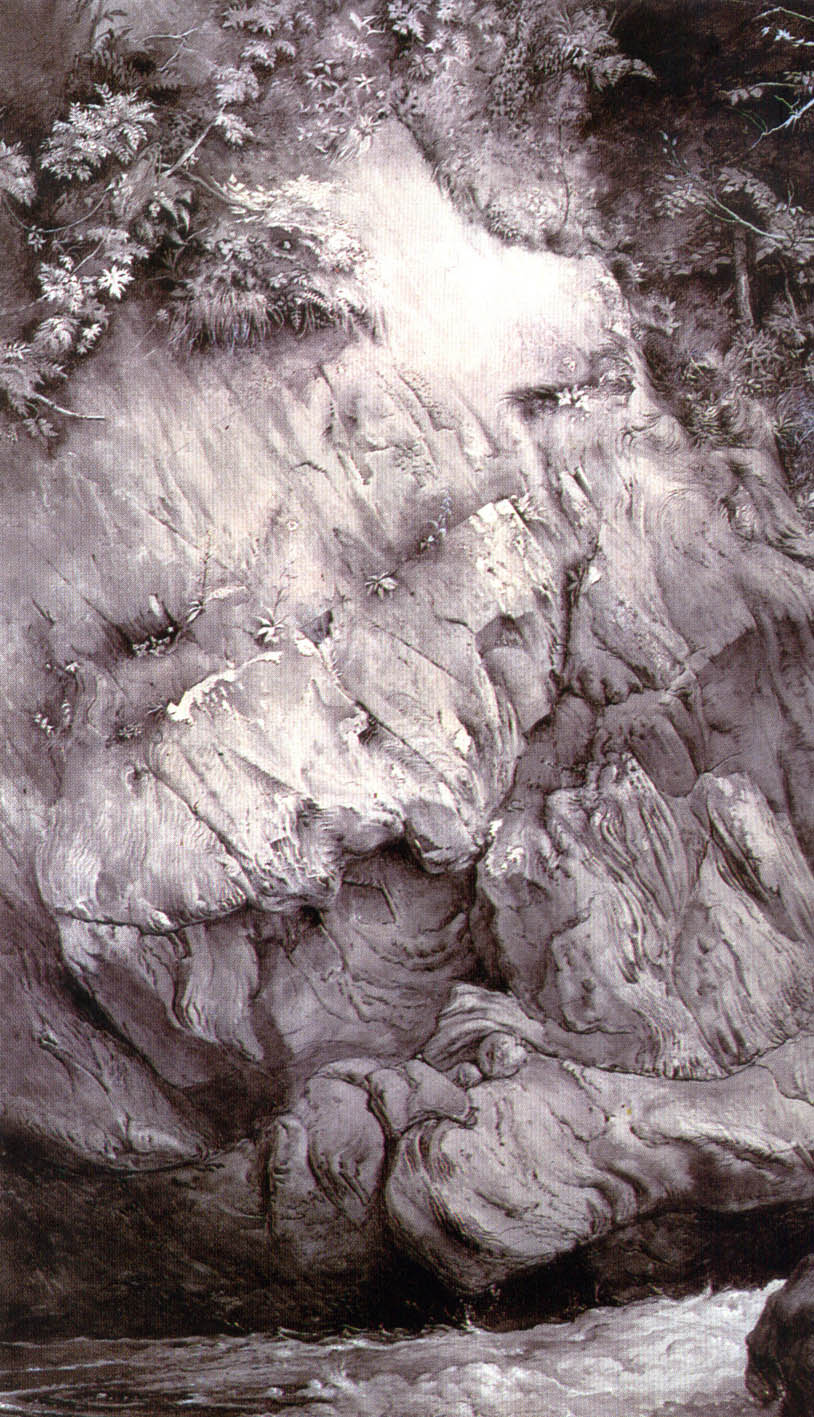
Study of Gneiss Rock, Glenfinlas, Pen and ink study by John Ruskin, 1853, Ashmolean Museum, Oxford

Millais found it very difficult to be in the same room as Ruskin when he was completing the work in London, calling it "the most hateful task I have ever had to perform". As soon as the portrait was finished he broke off contact with Ruskin. Ruskin himself temporarily moved the portrait so that his father would not see it, since he was concerned that he would damage or destroy it.

== Provenance ==
The painting was given by Ruskin to his friend Henry Wentworth Acland in 1871. It was left to his daughter, the photographer Sarah Angelina Acland, who kept it above her desk at the Acland family home in Broad Street, central Oxford and later at her own home in Park Town, North Oxford, where she photographed it in colour. It was then passed down through the family until it was sold at Christie's in 1965. The purchaser retained the painting until they died in 2012. It was accepted by the British Government in lieu of inheritance tax in 2013 and permanently allocated to the Ashmolean Museum, Oxford, to which it had been on loan since 2012 and where it has been on display since 2013.

The painting has been exhibited several times, including exhibitions on the Pre-Raphaelites at Tate Britain, London, in 1984 and 2004. The painting was included in an exhibition on Colour Revolution in Victorian times at the Ashmolean Museum in Oxford during 2023–24, together with the first colour photograph taken of it, held in the History of Science Museum, Oxford.

The painting was valued by the Director of Finance at Oxford University at £7.0 million in 2012–13. The painting featured in the 2014 film Effie Gray.

== See also ==
- List of paintings by John Everett Millais
- Thomas Carlyle (Millais)
