= The Floure and the Leafe =

The Floure and the Leafe is an anonymous Middle English allegorical poem in 595 lines of rhyme royal, written around 1470. During the 17th, 18th, and most of the 19th century it was mistakenly believed to be the work of Geoffrey Chaucer, and was generally considered to be one of his finest poems. The name of the author is not known but the poem presents itself as the work of a woman, and some critics are inclined to take this at face value. The poet was certainly well-read, there being a number of echoes of earlier writers in the poem, including Geoffrey Chaucer, John Lydgate, John Gower, Andreas Capellanus, Guillaume de Lorris, Guillaume de Machaut, Jean Froissart, Eustache Deschamps, Christine de Pizan, and the authors of the "Lai du Trot" and the Kingis Quair.

== Synopsis ==
The young female narrator, unable to sleep, walks out to an oak-grove and finds an arbour, where a goldfinch is singing in a medlar tree. There is also a nightingale in a laurel:

The nightingale with so merry a note
Answered him that all the wood rong,
So sodainly that, as it were a sote,
I stood astonied; so was I with the song
Thorow ravished, that, till late and long,
I ne wist in what place I was, ne where;
And ayen, me thought, she song even by mine ere.

The narrator sees a company of ladies and knights arriving, dressed in white and wearing chaplets made of various kinds of leaf. The knights joust with each other, then join the ladies and dance with them in the shade of a laurel tree. Then a second company arrives, this time dressed in green and ornamented with flowers. They perform a bergerette, a dance-song, in praise of the daisy, until they are overcome first by the oppressive midday heat and then by a storm. The company of the leaf, safely sheltered by their laurel, courteously come to the aid of the company of the flower drying their drenched clothes over improvised fires.

And after that they yede about gadering
Pleasaunt salades, which they made hem eat
For to refresh their great unkindly heat.

The meaning of these events is explained to the narrator by a beautiful woman in white. The company of the leaf are devoted to virginity, or at any rate to faithfulness in love, and their queen is Diana.

And as for her that crowned is in greene,
It is Flora, of these floures goddesse.
And all that here on her awaiting beene,
It are such that loved idlenes
And not delite of no busines
But for to hunt and hauke, and pley in medes,
And many other such idle dedes.

The beauty of flowers lasts only for a season, but the beauty of leaves endures. The narrator finally decides that she will be of the company of the leaf.

== Textual history ==
Longleat 258, a manuscript of Middle English poems held at Longleat House in Wiltshire, mentions in its contents list a poem whose title is given in the Latinised form "De folio et flore" (Of the Leaf and the Flower). Unfortunately the pages of the manuscript that contained this poem are now missing, but there is little doubt that it was "The Floure and the Leafe". The poem was first published in 1598 in Thomas Speght's edition of Chaucer's works, and there are reasons for thinking that it was printed from a faulty transcript of the separated Longleat pages. In the absence of any ancient manuscript of the poem Speght's book is the only authority for the text.

== Reception ==
For nearly 300 years after Speght's edition it was almost universally accepted that "The Floure and the Leafe" was the work of Geoffrey Chaucer. John Dryden was the first major writer to pick out "The Floure and the Leafe" for special attention, writing a modernized version of it for inclusion in his Fables, Ancient and Modern (1700), and writing that

There is another [tale] of his own Invention, after the manner of the Provencalls, call'd "The Flower and the Leaf", with which I was so particularly pleas'd, both for the Invention and the Moral, that I cannot hinder my self from recommending it to the Reader.

Dryden's advocacy was the making of the poem's reputation, and for nearly two centuries praise came unstintingly. Alexander Pope reported that "every body has been delighted" with it, and on his own account called it a masterpiece. William Hazlitt thought the opening section "one of the finest parts of Chaucer" and spoke of the poem's "enchanting simplicity and concentrated feeling", while Thomas Campbell judged that "No one who remembers his productions of the House of Fame and the "Flower and the Leaf", will regret that he sported for a season in the field of allegory." Keats read the poem and wrote an admiring sonnet about it, "This pleasant tale is like a little copse", which included the line "What mighty power has this gentle story". It has been suggested that his "Ode to a Nightingale" was in part inspired by the Middle English poem, or by Dryden's modernization of it. The musician and poet Sidney Lanier outdid them all when he declared "The Floure and the Leafe" was worth all the Canterbury Tales put together. In 1868 scenes from the poem were represented in the memorial window (destroyed in World War II) placed above Chaucer's tomb in Westminster Abbey. The same year, the scholar Henry Bradshaw gave reasons for thinking the poem to have been written too late to be Chaucer's work. The pioneering Middle English scholar Thomas Tyrwhitt had published his own doubts as early as 1778, and been universally derided for this heresy. Now, however, Bradshaw's judgement was seconded by ten Brink, who produced many arguments for rejecting it from the canon of Chaucer's works. Attempts to counter these arguments were unavailing, and thereafter the poem had to make its own way in the world, without the protection of Chaucer's name. The great philologist Walter Skeat accepted Bradshaw's judgement, and spoke of the poem's "tinsel-like glitter…which gives it a flashy attractiveness, in striking contrast to the easy grace of Chaucer's workmanship". On the other hand, The Cambridge History of English Literature in 1908 found its charm undiminished:

There is a singular brightness and freshness over it all, together with a power of pre-Raphaelite decoration and of vivid portraiture—even of such action as there is—which is very rare. Indeed, out of Chaucer himself and the original beginning of Guillaume de Lorris in the Roman de la Rose, it would be difficult to find anything of the kind better done.

As late as 1936 the poem was so well known that C. S. Lewis, in The Allegory of Love, could claim that "The story is probably familiar to every reader." He saw the poem as "a hybrid – a moral allegory wearing the dress of the Rose tradition", and praised the author, though in rather condescending terms:

If she cannot claim wisdom, she has a great deal of good sense and good humour, and is guided by them to write a poem more original than she herself, perhaps, suspected. A similar merit, and a similar limitation, appear in her execution. She describes what interests her, selecting rather by temperament than by art; and she finds considerable difficulty in getting the right number of syllables into each line.

In recent years Derek Pearsall has produced two editions of "The Floure and the Leafe", and re-examined the poem's historical context but relatively few critics have published studies of it. Some of that is changing, however, as interest in gender has gained traction. For example, Michelle M. Sauer has suggested the poem exhibits traces of lesbian desire and a female desiring gaze. However, work remains to be done, particularly since, as Kathleen Formi has noted, "To my knowledge, the poem has not been anthologized."

== Modern editions ==
- F. S. Ellis (ed.) The Floure and the Leafe; and, The Boke of Cupid, God of Love; or, The Cuckow and the Nightingale Hammersmith: Kelmscott Press, 1896.
- The Flower and the Leaf London: Edward Arnold/New York: Samuel Buckley, 1902.
- Walter W. Skeat (ed.) Chaucerian and Other Pieces, Edited from Numerous Manuscripts…Being a Supplement to the Complete Works of Geoffrey Chaucer Oxford: Clarendon Press, 1897. Reprinted by Oxford University Press, 1935.
- D. A. Pearsall (ed.) The Floure and the Leafe, and The Assembly of Ladies London: Thomas Nelson, 1962. Reprinted by Manchester University Press, 1980.
- Derek Pearsall (ed.) The Floure and the Leafe, The Assembly of Ladies, The Isle of Ladies Kalamazoo: Western Michigan University, 1990.
