= Le Roman de la Rose and Le Jeu des Échecs Moralisé =

Le Roman de la Rose (The Romance of the Rose) and Le Jeu des échecs moralisé (The Moralized Game of Chess) are two 14th-century French illuminated manuscripts in the University of Chicago Library Special Collections. They were once bound together, before being separated in 1907.

== Creation ==
=== Patronage ===
The manuscripts were created around 1365, during the reign of Charles V of France. During that period, manuscripts were commonly commissioned by members of the court. Many texts were translated into French during this time. It was also during this time that Charles V created the French Royal Library.

=== Illumination ===
There are a total of 43 miniatures in the Roman De La Rose manuscript. The illuminations for both manuscripts were created by the Master of Saint Voult. The decorations in both manuscripts are very similar; figures have similar expressions and poses, and the same colors are used in both manuscripts.

== Provenance ==
The earliest record of ownership comes from notes on the manuscripts themselves, which contained the names of some of the 16th-century owners.

The first evidence that the two manuscripts were bound together is found in Bibliotheca Croftsiana: a Catalogue of the Curious and Distinguished Library of the late Reverend and Learned Thomas Crofts, A.M., Chancellor of the Diocese of Peterborough. In 1907, the texts were separated by museum curator and collector Sydney Cockerell.

== Le Roman De La Rose ==
Le Roman De La Rose (The Romance of the Rose) is a medieval poem written in Old French. It is an example of courtly literature. The first part, written by Guillaume de Lorris describes a courtier's attempts at wooing his beloved woman. The second part, by Jean de Meun, expands on the role of allegorical characters in Lorris's first part of the work.

== Le Jeu des échecs moralisé ==
Le Jeu des échecs moralisé is a French translation of the Latin book Liber de moribus hominum et officiis nobilium super ludo scacchorum ('Book of the customs of men and the duties of nobles or the Book of Chess') by Dominican Friar Jacobus de Cessolis. It was written in the second half of the 13th century and was a compilation of Jacobus de Cessolis's sermons on morality. The sermons used the game of chess to describe an ideal society.
