= Roman de la Rose of François I =

The Roman de la Rose of François I
- The Morgan Library & Museum, New York, MS M.948
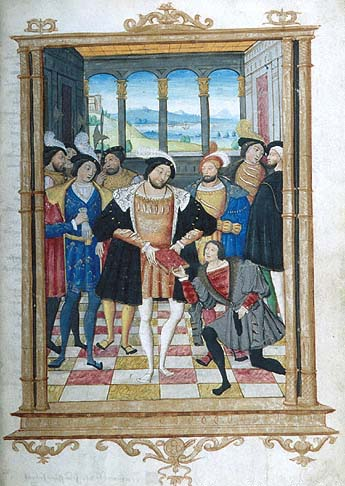
- Dedication miniature, f. 4r
- Type: poetry
- Date: 1520s
- Place of origin: Rouen
- Scribe: Girard Acarie
- Author(s): Guillaume de Lorris, Jean de Meun
- Illuminated by: Master of Girard Acarie
- Material: vellum
- Size: 262 × 186 mm; 210 leaves
- Condition: 3 leafs removed
- Contents: Roman de la Rose
- Illumination: 107

The Roman de la Rose of François I is a richly illuminated sixteenth-century manuscript copy of the immensely popular and widely circulated mediaeval French allegorical poem Roman de la Rose. Produced in Rouen in the 1520s as a gift for King François I of France (r. 1515–1547), the manuscript was commissioned – and partly produced – by Girard Acarie, a high-ranking royal official. It is the latest known illuminated manuscript copy of the Roman de la Rose.

It is currently held by the Morgan Library & Museum in New York as MS M.948.

== Authors and contributors ==
The original Roman de la Rose (“Romance of the Rose”) was composed in the 13th century in Old French in two stages by: Guillaume de Lorris, who wrote the shorter first part, and Jean de Meun, who composed the much longer continuation. The text preserved in the manuscript of François I is a modernized Middle French version based on a Parisian printed edition published by Michel le Noir in 1519.

The manuscript opens with a dedicatory epistle to François I written by Girard Acarie, secretary to the king and later controller-general of finances in Normandy. In the epistle Acarie explains his reasons for offering the manuscript to the king and identifies himself both as its commissioner and as its scribe, having copied the entire text himself. Acarie also inserted a ten-line rhymed panegyric to François I into the final section of the poem, in a passage concerning the nature of true nobility.

The illuminations are attributed to an anonymous artist conventionally known as the Master of Girard Acarie, named after the corpus of works produced for this patron. The royal copy of the Roman de la Rose is generally regarded as the artist’s most accomplished work. The Master of Girard Acarie has also been associated with other devotional and literary manuscripts made for noble and institutional patrons in the Rouen region, where the artist was probably based and active from about 1520 to 1535. The Roman de la Rose manuscript exemplifies the hallmarks of the Master’s style: a bright, vibrant palette, and dynamic, expressive figures influenced of Antwerp Mannerism.

== Description ==
The codex, now comprising 210 leaves, survives in an almost complete state, lacking only one folio and one bifolium. It was copied on vellum and measures approximately 262 × 186 mm. It is illustrated with an unusually extensive cycle of 107 high-quality miniatures. Its intended royal destination is reflected in both its opulent execution and its pictorial and textual content.

The manuscript contains the poem’s versified text arranged in two columns, except for Acarie’s dedicatory epistle. The text closely follows the 1519 Paris printed edition of the poem, including rubrics in rhyming verse that divide the poem into narrative sections and serve as captions for the illustrations.

Contents:

- Girard Acarie’s dedicatory epistle (f. 4v).
- Guillaume de Lorris’s part of the Roman de la Rose (ff. 5r–43v), recounting the Lover’s dream of the Garden of Delight, where he falls in love with the Rose, later imprisoned in the fortress of Jealousy.
- Jean de Meun’s continuation of the Roman de la Rose (ff. 43v–207r), narrating the Lover’s quest to free and pluck the Rose, interspersed with lengthy discourses by allegorical figures such as Reason and Nature.

A rhymed panegyric to François I is inserted on ff. 180v–181r.

A two-page frontispiece, consisting of the full-page arms of François I and a full-page presentation scene, precedes the dedicatory epistle. The poem proper begins on folio 5r and is illustrated with 38 half-column miniatures (mostly in Guillaume de Lorris’s section) and 67 large miniatures. The larger miniatures are framed by Italianate architectural frames incorporating portions of the text.

== Iconography ==
Compared with other surviving illustrated copies of the Roman de la Rose, the manuscript of François I stands out both for the scale of its pictorial cycle and for its innovations in traditional Rose iconography. The manuscript expands on the traditional iconographic cycle by including many rarely illustrated scenes, such as the painter Zeuxis at work, and by introducing compositions not known in any other surviving copy, notably a remarkable two-page visual juxtaposition of the treacherous Garden of Delight and the heavenly Park of the Lamb. Several figures and even some entire compositions can be traced to circulating sets of prints, notably works by Lucas van Leyden, such as depictions of Lucretia, Samson and Delilah.

A particular interest in illustrating mythological and historical themes, even if only briefly mentioned in the poem, reflects both Renaissance humanist engagement with Classical Antiquity and perhaps an effort to appeal to François I’s interests, as many of these stories concern questions of nobility, rulership, good government, social order, and the advancement of civilization. Many figures and settings were updated in accordance with Renaissance visual conventions or reimagined in forms resembling Greco-Roman deities. The God of Love, for example, is reimagined as Cupid, and Criminality is depicted in a martial guise recalling Mars. The architectural frames of the illustrations likewise incorporate classical motifs such as columns, acanthus ornament, and medallions.
