= The Earthly Paradise =

Epic poem by William Morris

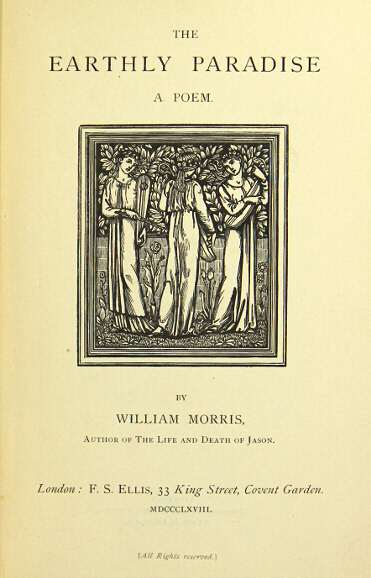
Title page of first volume of The Earthly Paradise, 1868

The Earthly Paradise is an epic poem by William Morris. It is a lengthy collection of retellings of various myths and legends from Greece and Scandinavia. Publication began in 1868 and several later volumes followed until 1870. The volumes were published by F.S. Ellis.

Morris uses a frame story concerning a group of medieval wanderers searching for a land of everlasting life. After much disillusionment they discover a surviving colony of Greeks with whom they exchange stories. The poem is divided into twelve sections, each section representing a month of the year and containing two tales told in verse, drawn largely from classical mythology or mediaeval legends, including the Icelandic sagas. All Morris's subsequent books were published as "by the author of The Earthly Paradise".

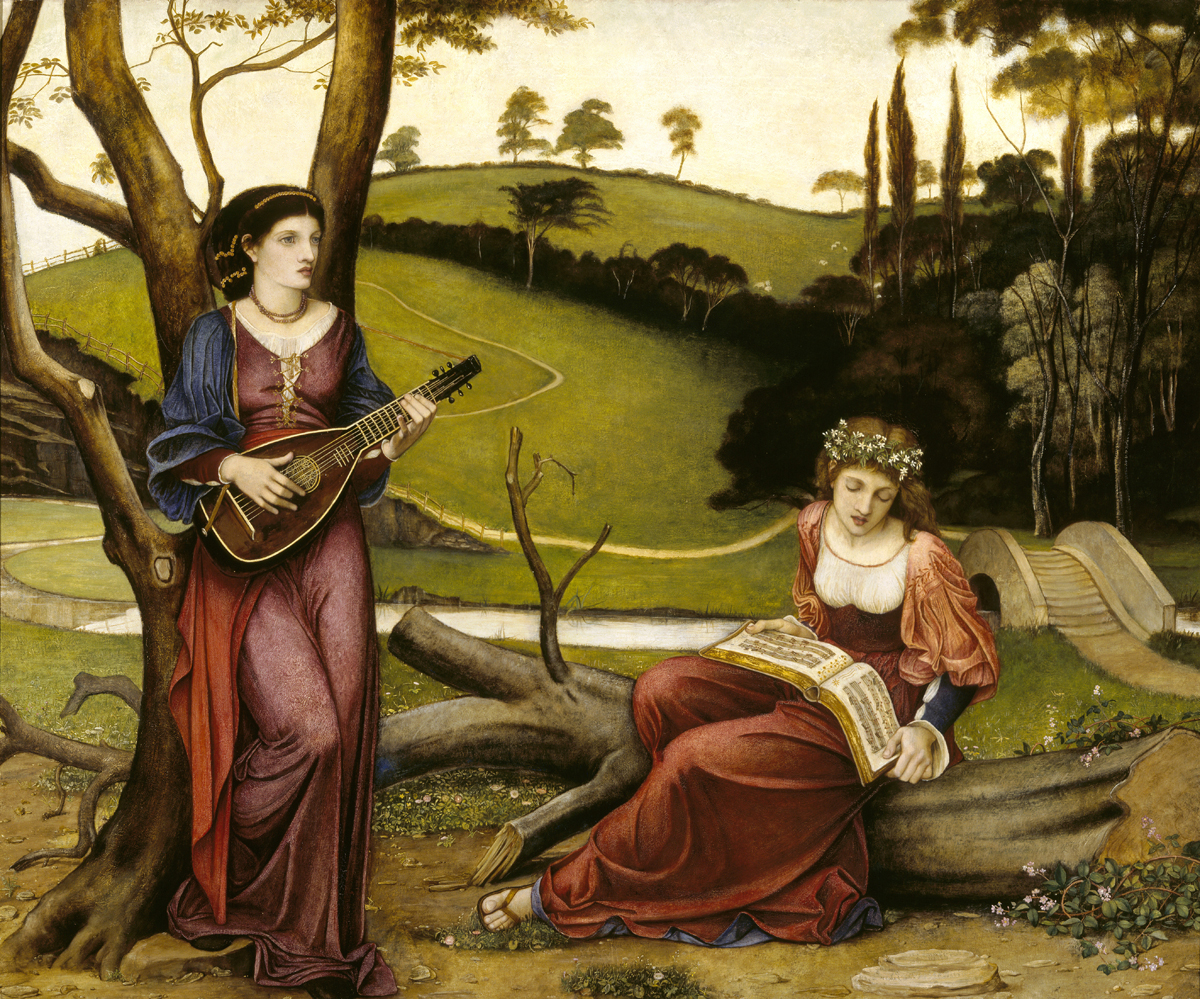
The Gentle Music of a Bygone Day, John Roddam Spencer Stanhope, 1873

== Story ==
The prologue introduces a company of Norsemen who have fled the pestilence and set sail to seek the fabled Earthly Paradise "across the western sea where none grow old." Not having succeeded in their quest, they have returned "shrivelled, bent, and grey," after lengthy wanderings abroad, to a "nameless city in a distant sea" where the worship of the ancient Greek gods has not died out. In this hospitable city they spend the rest of their lives. Twice each month they participate in a feast at which a tale is told, alternately, by one of the city elders and one of the wanderers. The former tell tales on classical subjects, and the latter draw their tales from Norse and other medieval sources. Thus, of the twenty-four stories, twelve are Greek and classical and twelve are medieval or romantic. Each pair of stories corresponds with one of the twelve months, which follow the natural succession of the seasons. In this way, the first two tales are told in March, the second two in April, and so on. Thus the long poem is neatly partitioned into twelve books with interpolated prologues and epilogues in the form of lyrics about the progressive changes in nature.

== Form ==
The Earthly Paradise is written in different forms. William Morris used rhyme royal, heroic couplet or iambic tetrameter. This is an example of seven-line rhyme royal (with rhyme scheme ABABBCC).

O love, this morn when the sweet nightingale
Had so long finished all he had to say,
That thou hadst slept, and sleep had told his tale;
And midst a peaceful dream had stolen away
In fragrant dawning of the first of May,
Didst thou see aught? didst thou hear voices sing
Ere to the risen sun the bells 'gan ring?

— May, Stanza 1

== Reception ==
The Earthly Paradise was generally well received by reviewers: according to one study it "established Morris's reputation as one of the foremost poets of his day".

== Influence ==
Tolkien's use of frame stories was directly influenced by Morris's poem. In particular, the frame story of Tolkien's legendarium, starting from the travels of Ælfwine the mariner, was modelled on the poem's frame story, that "mariners of Norway, having ... heard of the Earthly Paradise, set sail to find it". Morris's "wanderers" reach "A nameless city in a distant sea / White as the changing walls of faërie", where they hear and narrate legends including "The Land East of the Sun and West of the Moon"; Tolkien's Book of Lost Tales II contains one of the legendarium's foundation-poems that similarly describes the "Wanderer" Earendel, who sails "West of the Moon, east of the Sun".

== Bibliography ==
- The Earthly Paradise. A Poem by William Morris (Review).
- Introduction to the 2002 edition by Florence Boos
- Lee, Stuart D., ed. (2020) [2014]. A Companion to J. R. R. Tolkien. Wiley Blackwell. ISBN 978-111965602-9.
- Mackail, John William (1922). The Life of William Morris . London: Longmans, Green & Co. OCLC 785116 – via Wikisource. (new impression, in one volume, of the 1899 text)
