= Ewald Flügel =

German philologist (1863–1914)

Ewald Flügel (May 8, 1863, in Leipzig, Kingdom of Saxony, - November 14, 1914, Palo Alto, California) was one of the international pioneers of the study of Old and Middle English Literature and Language and one of the founding professors of English Studies at Stanford University.

== Biography ==
Flügel, whose father (Karl Alfred Felix Flügel, 1820–1904) and grandfather (Johann Gottfried Flügel, 1788–1855) were involved in lexicographic projects and the teaching of English, was educated at the famous Nicolai School in Leipzig. He attended Leipzig University and received his doctoral degree with a dissertation on Thomas Carlyle in 1885, his postdoctoral degree with a study of Philip Sidney in 1888. From 1888 to 1892 he taught as "Privatdozent" (associate professor without tenure) at Leipzig and became coeditor (with Gustav Schirmer) of Anglia, Germany's second academic journal dedicated to the study of English. Because he was unable to find the coveted professorship at Leipzig, he accepted a position at the newly founded Stanford University in California in 1892, where he taught until his death in 1914. Together with Bernhard ten Brink, Julius Zupitza, John Koch, and Eugen Kölbing he counts among the most entrepreneurial founding scholars of English Studies.

== Research and Scholarship ==
While still in Leipzig, Flügel was approached by Frederick James Furnivall, the founder of the Chaucer Society, to take on the task of establishing a concordance for the works of the medieval English poet, Geoffrey Chaucer. What he inherited from colleagues who had previously worked on this large lexicographic topic was "slips of all sizes, shapes, colors, weights and textures, from paper that was almost tissue-paper to paper that was almost tin. Every slip contained matter that had to be reconsidered, revised, and often added to or deleted." Flügel, for several years supported by a grant from the Carnegie Foundation, extended the already difficult project into a plan for a full-fledged dictionary of Middle English. By 1908, he had collected a total of about 1,120,000 Chaucer slips and, realizing the enormous nature of the venue, began publishing the first letters of the dictionary in installments. Despite his work ethic and the support from a number of colleagues in Germany, France, Britain, and the U.S., he had to realize that his project would be impossible to finish. After his death, two American colleagues, John Tatlock and Arthur Kennedy, would finalize the originally planned Chaucer Concordance. Flügel's work became the foundation of the Middle English Dictionary, which Hans Kurath and Sherman M. Kuhn edited in the 1950s and 1960s: "No mere description can do justice to the dignity and amplitude of this work of scholarship, if it could have been completed and published. It would have set a new high-water mark for lexicography [...]; and it anticipated the prophecy of the editors of the Oxford Dictionary that further progress in the field must be with the specialized vocabularies of certain subjects, authors, and periods."

In addition to his work on Chaucer, his monograph on Carlyle, and his edition of Sidney, he published a host of essays and reviews, some of which were republished by his son, Felix Flügel, in 1930. He also contributed the section on North American literature to Richard Wülcker's Geschichte der englischen Literatur (2nd. ed., 1907) and compiled an anthology, Neuenglisches Lesebuch (1895). In 1901-02 he was president of the western branch of the American Philological Association.

== Political Activity ==
Flügel shared with many of his fellow expatriates from Germany in the late nineteenth- and early twentieth century an enthusiasm about transplanting what they considered German ideas and ideals into the New World. In several speeches to German-American audiences, Flügel not only recommended the cultivation of German heritage in the United States, but declared that, "statistically speaking, in a matter of 50 years German immigrants will have become the ancestors of the larger half of this country" and that "In Germankind the world once more its weal may find" ("Es mag am Deutschen Wesen/Einmal noch die Welt genesen.")

== Select works ==
- "Carlyles religiöse und sittliche Entwicklung und Weltanschauung" (doctoral dissertation, Leipzig, 1887). Translated by Jessica Gilbert Tyler as Thomas Carlyle's Moral and Religious Development (New York: Holbrook, 1891).
- "Sir Philip Sidney's Astrophel and Stella und Defence of Poesie. Nach den ältesten Ausgaben mit einer Einleitung über Sidney's Leben und Werk" (postgraduate submission, Halle, 1888)
- "Roger Bacon's Stellung in der Geschichte der Philosophie." Philosophische Studien 19 (1902), 164-91.
- "Henry Bradshaw: Librarian and Scholar." Library Journal 29 (1904), 409-13.
- “Die nordamerikanische Litteratur” (“North American literature”) in Richard Wülcker, Geschichte der englischen Literatur (2nd. ed., 1907)
- "Frederick James Furnivall (1825-1910)." Anglia Beiblatt 33 (1910), 527-29.
