= Roman de la Rose Digital Library =

The Roman de la Rose Digital Library (Rose DL) is a joint project of the Sheridan Libraries of the Johns Hopkins University and the Bibliothèque nationale de France. The goal of the Rose DL is to create an online library of all manuscripts containing the 13th-century poem Roman de la Rose. The library currently displays digital surrogates of more than 140 Roman de la Rose manuscripts, and the collection continues to grow. The entire collection is freely available to the public for scholarly research and personal use.

== History ==
This project first began in 1996 when Stephen G. Nichols, James M. Beall Professor of French and Chair of the Romance Languages and Literatures Department at Johns Hopkins University, approached staff at the Milton S. Eisenhower Library about digitizing Roman de la Rose manuscripts for teaching purposes. After receiving funding from Ameritech Library Services, the Getty Grant Program, the Samuel H. Kress Foundation, and the Gladys Krieble Delmas Foundation, the Eisenhower Library created the prototype Roman de la Rose: Digital Surrogates of Medieval Manuscripts, which came to include six Rose manuscripts from various libraries in the US and UK. The original library contained manuscripts from the Walters Art Museum in Baltimore, the Morgan Library in New York, the J. Paul Getty Museum in Los Angeles, and the Bodleian Library in Oxford.

In 2007, the Bibliothèque nationale de France and the Rose DL began a partnership to digitize all the Rose manuscripts held in Paris and in municipal and university libraries in France for the site. With funding from the Andrew W. Mellon Foundation, this joint project makes available about half of the roughly 300 Rose manuscripts known to be extant.

== Features ==
All page images in the digital library may be viewed in a page turner application or in an image browsing format. Researchers may pan on a page or zoom down to a high degree of magnification. In addition to the images themselves, the Rose DL provides metadata that supports the research process. Many of the manuscripts have detailed manuscript descriptions that provide information about the history of the manuscript and about its physical characteristics such as binding, quire structure, material, and decoration. Full transcriptions exist for a few manuscripts and illustration descriptions are available for many.

It is often difficult to find the same narrative section in multiple manuscripts since they differ in line length, number of columns, and number of lines on a leaf. To get around this, the Rose DL includes a narrative sections tool that approximates the start and finish of each section. These are usually accurate to within two columns.
