= Moritz Trautmann =

Moritz Trautmann (24 March 1842, in Klöden – 23 April 1920, in Frankfurt) was a German Anglist.

He studied classical philology and modern languages at the universities of Halle and Berlin, and taught classes in Küstrin and Stettin. In 1876 he qualified as a lecturer of English philology, and four years later became an associate professor of English language and literature at the University of Bonn (full professor in 1885).

In 1877, with Richard Paul Wülker, he was cofounder of the journal Anglia, and from 1898 was editor of the Bonner Beiträge zur Anglistik.

== Selected works ==
- Bildung und Gebrauch der Tempora und Modi in der Chanson de Roland, 1871 – Formation and the use of tenses and modes in La Chanson de Roland.
- Über Verfasser und Entstehungszeit einiger alliterirender Gedichte des Altenglischen, 1876.
- Lachmanns Betonungsgesetze und Otfrids Vers, 1877 – Karl Lachmann's emphasis and Otfrid of Weissenburg's verse.
- Golagrus und Gawain, 1878 (as editor) – Golagros and Gawane.
- Die Sprachlaute : im allgemeinen, und die Laute des englischen, französischen und deutschen im besondern, 1884 – Language sounds, in general, and the sounds of English, French, and German, in particular.
- Kynewulf, der Bischof und Dichter: Untersuchungen über seine Werke und sein Leben, 1898 – Cynewulf, the bishop and poet; studies of his life and works.
- Kleine Lautlehre des Deutschen, Französischen und Englischen, 1903 – Small phoneme of German, French and English.
- Finn und Hildebrand: zwei beiträge zur kenntnis der altgermanischen heldendichtung, 1903 – Finn and Hildebrand; two contributions to the knowledge of the old German heroic poem.
- Das Beowulflied; als anhang das Finn-bruchstück und die Waldhere-bruchstücke, 1904.
- Die altenglischen Rätsel : (die Rätsel des Exeterbuchs), 1915 – Old English riddles: (the riddles of the Exeter Book).
