= Ernst Wülcker =

- Born: 24 August 1843; Frankfurt am Main
- Died: 16 August 1895 (aged 51); Weimar, German Empire
- Education: Leipzig University; University of Göttingen
- Scientific career
- Fields: Lexicography

Ernst Wülcker (24 August 1843, in Frankfurt am Main – 16 September 1895, in Weimar) was a German archivist and lexicographer. He was an older brother of philologist Richard Paul Wülker (1845–1910).

He studied classical philology and Germanistics at the universities of Göttingen and Leipzig, and in 1870 was named secretary at the Frankfurt city archives. In 1875, he relocated to Weimar as the first secretary of the private and city archives. In 1888 he was promoted to the archival council in Weimar.

== Published works ==
With Lorenz Diefenbach, he was the author of the Hoch- und nieder-deutsches Wörterbuch der mittleren und neueren Zeit ("High and Low German dictionary of medieval and modern times"), and from 1886 to 1895 made contributions to the Deutsches Wörterbuch. He was also the author of twenty biographies in the Allgemeine Deutsche Biographie. Other written efforts by Wülcker include:

- Urkunden und Schreiben betreffend den Zug der Armagnaken (1439–1444), 1873 – Documents and writings concerning the campaign of the Armagnacs (1439–1444).
- Urkunden und Acten betreffend die Belagerung der Stadt Neuss am Rheine (1474–75), 1877 – Documents and acts concerning the Siege of Neuss am Rhein, 1474–75.
- Die Entstehung der kursächsischen Kanzleisprache, 1878 – The emergence of the Saxon Chancellery language.
- Die Verdienste der Fruchtbringenden Gesellschaft um die deutsche Sprache, 1888.
