= Fables, Ancient and Modern =

1700 book by John Dryden

Fables, Ancient and Modern is a collection of translations of classical and medieval poetry by John Dryden interspersed with some of his own works. Published in March 1700, it was his last and one of his greatest works. Dryden died two months later.

== Background ==
After the deposition of his patron James II in 1688, Dryden turned to translation to provide himself with a steady income. Dryden’s education at the Westminster School had provided him with an excellent grounding in translation, which was a conventional exercise at the time.

Fables, Ancient and Modern contains translations of the First Book of Homer's Iliad, eight selections from Ovid's Metamorphoses, three of Geoffrey Chaucer's Canterbury Tales (and an imitation from the Prologue on "The Character of a Good Parson"), the later medieval poem The Flower and the Leaf, which he thought was by Chaucer, and three stories from Boccaccio. The volume also contains a number of Dryden's own works, including "Alexander's Feast" and a preface in which he lauds Chaucer, calling him "the Father of English poetry". All the translations are in his characteristic heroic couplet, which uses alexandrines and triplets to vary the movement.

Dryden aimed to increase the English people's literary reputation by appropriating the greatest traditions in literature and developing them into new genres.

An interesting feature of the preface is that Dryden did not understand Chaucer's Middle English prosody and dismissed his versification as irregular, because Middle English pronunciation was not properly understood at the time. In fact, since Dryden was working with Thomas Speght's extremely corrupt edition of Chaucer (printed overleaf from the translations in the California edition), and "The Flower and the Leaf" is prosodically unlike the poems by Chaucer, he could not possibly have scanned Chaucer even if he had assigned the correct Middle English values.

== Reception ==
The English public were eager recipients of his translations, and saw them as connecting English literature with the great works of the past. The Fables were greatly admired throughout the 18th century, and their form and versification were imitated by John Keats in "Lamia."
