= Henry Bradshaw (scholar) =

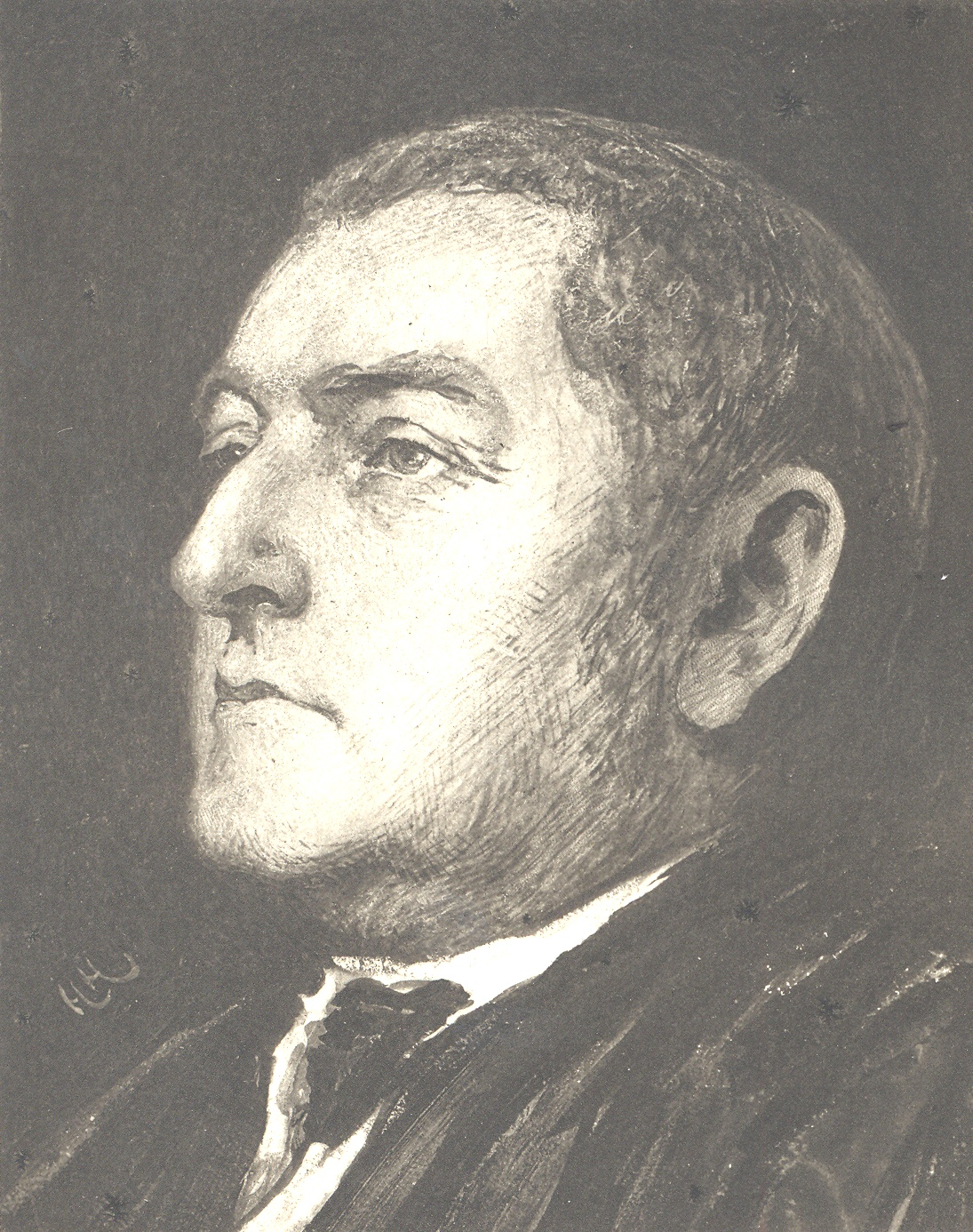
Portrait by Hubert von Herkomer

Henry Bradshaw (2 February 1831 – 10 February 1886) was a British scholar and librarian.

Henry Bradshaw was born in London, England, the son of Joseph Hoare Bradshaw, a banker. He was educated at Eton and King's College, Cambridge, where he became a fellow in 1853. After a brief spell from 1854 to 1856 as an Assistant Master at Saint Columba's College, Dublin, he accepted an appointment in the Cambridge University Library as an extra assistant.

== Bibliographical work ==
When he found that his official duties absorbed all his leisure he resigned his post, but continued to give his time to the examination of the manuscripts and early printed books in the library. There was then no complete catalogue of these sections, and Bradshaw soon showed a rare faculty for investigations respecting old books and curious manuscripts.

=== Celtic and Waldensian texts ===
In addition to his achievements in black-letter bibliography he threw great light on ancient Celtic language and literature by the discovery, in 1857, of the Book of Deer, a manuscript copy of the Gospels in the Vulgate version, in which were inscribed old Gaelic charters. This was published by the Spalding Club in 1869. Bradshaw also discovered some Celtic glosses on the manuscript of a metrical paraphrase of the Gospels by Juvencus. He made another find in the Cambridge library of considerable philological and historical importance; Cromwell's envoy, Sir Samuel Morland (1625–1695), had brought back from Piedmont manuscripts containing the earliest known Waldensian records, consisting of translations from the Bible, religious treatises and poems. One of the poems referred to the beginning of the 11th century, though the manuscripts did not appear to be of earlier date than the 15th century. On this Morland had based his theory of the antiquity of the Waldensian doctrine, and, in the absence of the manuscripts, which were supposed to be irretrievably lost, the conclusion was accepted. Bradshaw discovered the manuscripts in the university library, and found in the passage indicated traces of erasure. The original date proved to be 1400. Incidentally the correct date was of great value in the study of the history of the language.

=== Simonides and Lydgate ===
He had a share in exposing the frauds of Constantine Simonides, who had asserted that the Codex Sinaiticus brought by Tischendorf from the Greek monastery of Mount Sinai was a modern forgery of which he was himself the author. Bradshaw exposed the absurdity of these claims in a letter to the Guardian (26 January 1863). In 1866 he made a valuable contribution to the history of Scottish literature by the discovery of 2200 lines on the siege of Troy incorporated in a manuscript of Lydgate's Troye Booke, and of the Legends of the Saints, an important work of some 40,000 lines. These poems he attributed, erroneously, as has since been proved, to Barbour.

=== International Relations ===
In the absence of easily accessible library catalogs, Bradshaw played an important role in providing English literature and language scholars from other countries with access to and information about the location of medieval manuscripts. Ewald Flügel, a German scholar who had moved from Leipzig to Stanford University, praised him as the "librarian of librarians," and Bernhard ten Brink, first chair of English Philology in Germany, called him "the most thorough" of "all living Chaucer scholars."

=== Administration ===
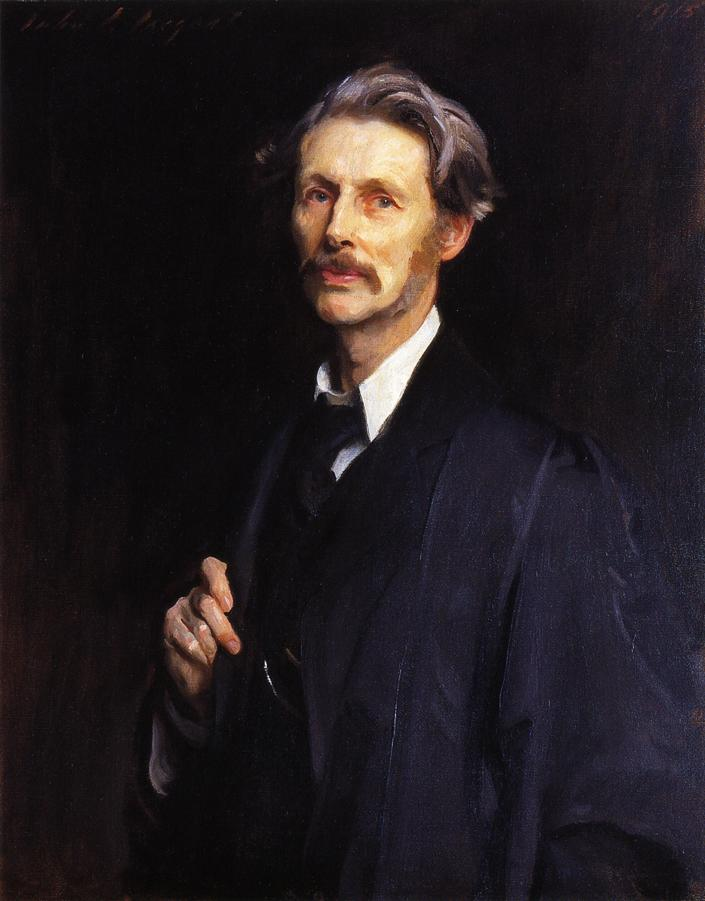
Francis J. H. Jenkinson, John Singer Sargent, 1915

Bradshaw allowed his attention to be divided over many areas, and wrote little that has lasted. He was elected (1867) university librarian, and as dean of his college (1857–1865) and praelector (1863–1868) he was involved in further routine duties. Besides his discoveries in bibliography, he improved the standard of library administration. His papers on antiquarian subjects were edited by Francis John Henry Jenkinson in 1889.

He had a great influence on Karl Pearson.
