= Anglia (journal) =

- Discipline: Linguistics, English language
- Language: English, German

Publication details
- History: 1878–present
- Publisher: Walter de Gruyter
- Frequency: Quarterly

Standard abbreviations
- ISO 4: Anglia

Indexing
- ISSN: 0340-5222 (print); 1865-8938 (web)
- LCCN: 11034198
- OCLC no.: 01481149

Links
- Journal homepage

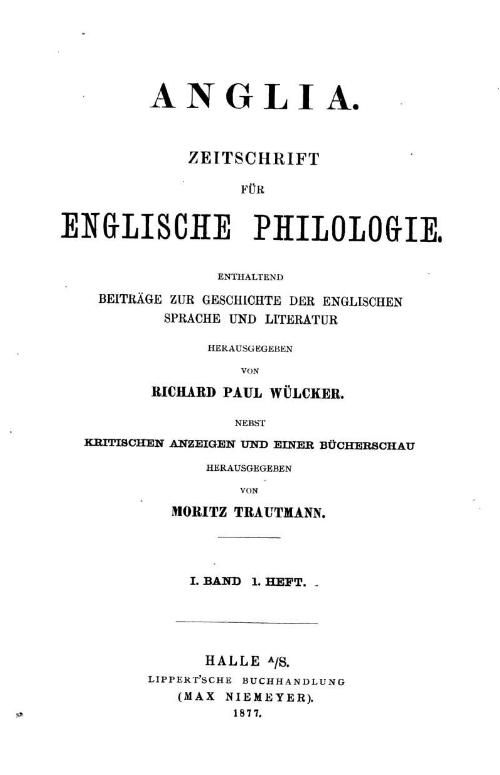
Cover of Anglia, 1877

Anglia, subtitled Zeitschrift für Englische Philologie, is a German quarterly academic journal on English linguistics, published by de Gruyter. It was established in 1878 by Moritz Trautmann and Richard Paul Wülker, then based at the University of Leipzig. Between 1888 and 1892 Ewald Flügel, also at Leipzig, acted as editor in conjunction with Gustav Schirmer. Although a German publication, it is the longest-established journal for the study of the English language in the world, having been published continuously since 1878. Anglia publishes articles on the English language and its history, and English literature from the Middle Ages through to modern times. It also covers American literature and English-language literature from around the world. Its scope extends to general and theoretical studies of comparative literature and culture.
