= Richard Paul Wülker =

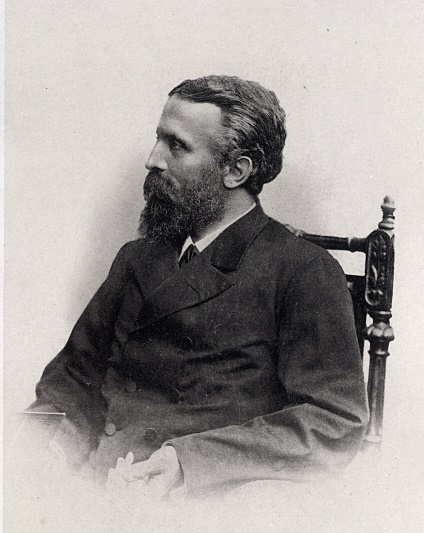
- Born: July 29, 1845
- Died: August 8, 1910 (aged 65)

Academic background
- Education: Humboldt University of Berlin; Leipzig University; University of Marburg

Academic work
- Discipline: English studies
- Institutions: Leipzig University

Richard Paul Wülker, until 1884 surname spelled as Wülcker (29 July 1845, in Frankfurt – 8 August 1910, in Leipzig) was a German Anglist.

He studied German and English philology at the universities of Berlin and Leipzig, and following military service in the Franco-Prussian War, he continued his education at the University of Marburg. In 1873 he obtained his habilitation for English philology at the University of Leipzig, where he later taught classes as an associate professor of English language and literature (1875–80), then served as a full professor from 1880 to 1910.

In 1877, with Moritz Trautmann, he founded the journal Anglia, which he edited until 1890. From 1888 onward, he was a member of the Saxon Academy of Sciences. In 1900 he was named a Saxon privy court councilor.

He was a brother of archivist Ernst Wülcker (1843–1895), and a son-in-law to classical philologist Ludwig Lange (1825–1885).

== Selected works ==
- Das Evangelium Nicodemi in der Abendländischen Literatur, 1872 – The Gospel of Nicodemus in Western literature.
- Altenglisches Lesebuch : zum Gebrauche bei Vorlesungen und zum Selbstunterricht, 1874 – Old English reading book for use during lectures and for self-instruction.
- Kleinere angelsächsische Dichtungen, 1879 – Smaller Anglo-Saxon poems.
- Bibliothek der angelsächsischen Poesie, as editor (by Christian W.M. Grein; 3 volumes, 1883–98) – Library of Anglo-Saxon poetry.
- Anglo-Saxon and Old English vocabularies (with Thomas Wright; 2nd edition, 2 volumes 1884).
- Geschichte der englischen litteratur von den ältesten zeiten bis zur gegenwart, 1885 – History of English literature from the earliest times to the present.
- Grundriss zur Geschichte der angelsächsischen Litteratur, 1885 – Outline of the history of Anglo-Saxon literature.
- Codex Vercellensis, as editor, 1894 – Codex Vercellensis.
- Die Arthursage in der englischen Literatur, 1895 – The Arthur Legend in English literature.
- William Shakespeare : Sein Leben und seine Werke (by Sidney Lee, with Wülker and Martha Schwabe, 1901) – William Shakespeare, his life and works.
