= Roman de la Rose =

Medieval French poem

The Romance of the Rose
- by Guillaume de Lorris & Jean de Meun
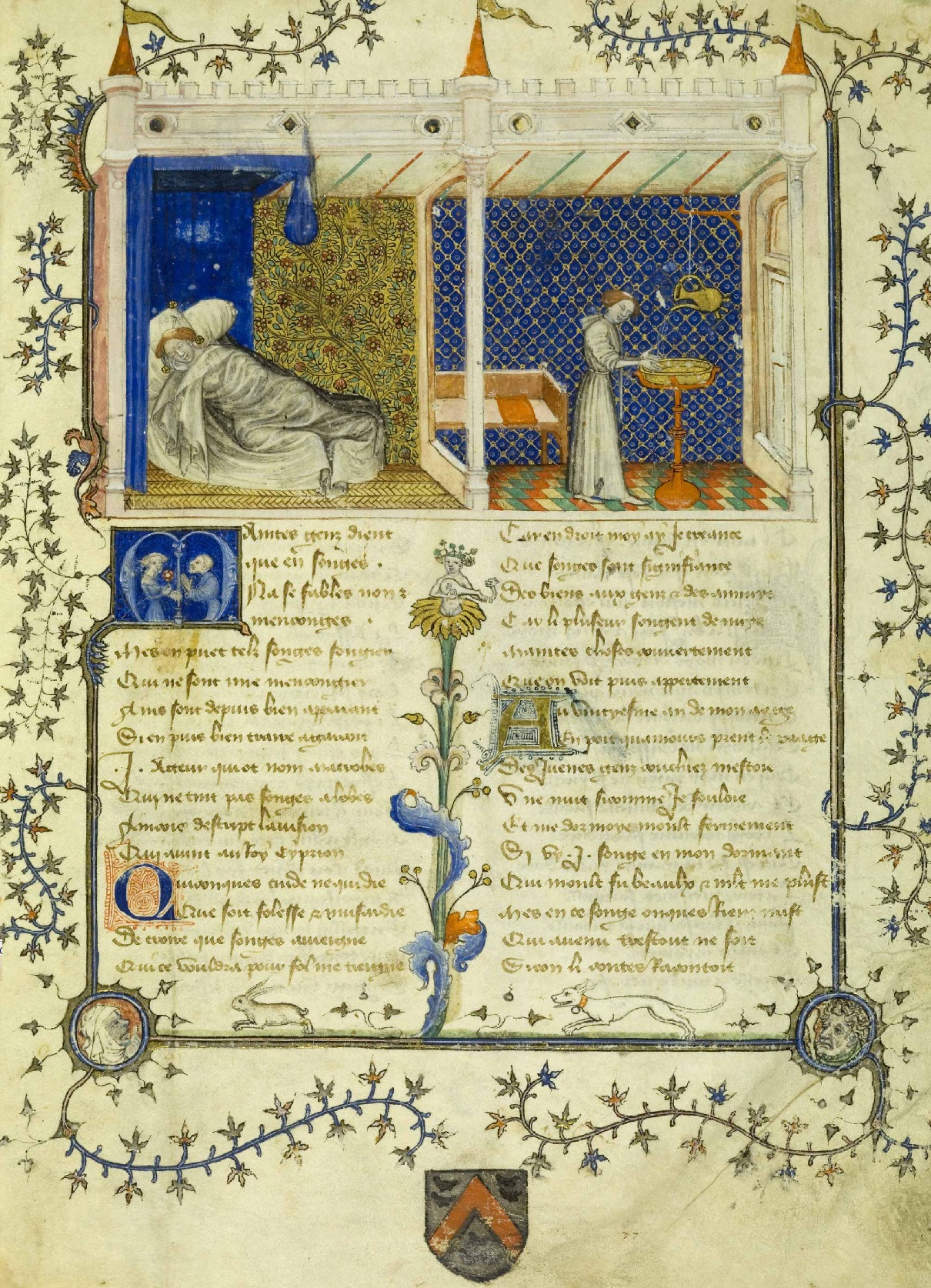
- Illuminated leaf from a manuscript of the poem, 1390
- Original title: Le Roman de la Rose
- Written: c. 1230 (part 1) c. 1275 (part 2)
- Language: Old French
- Genre: Courtly literature
- Le Roman de la Rose at French Wikisource

Le Roman de la Rose (The Romance of the Rose) is a medieval poem written in Old French and presented as an allegorical dream vision. As poetry, The Romance of the Rose is a notable instance of courtly literature, purporting to provide a "mirror of love" in which the whole art of romantic love is disclosed. Its two authors conceived it as a psychological allegory; throughout the Lover's quest, the word Rose is used both as the name of the titular lady and as an abstract symbol of female sexuality. The names of the other characters function both as personal names and as metonyms illustrating the different factors that lead to and constitute a love affair. Its long-lasting influence is evident in the number of surviving manuscripts of the work, in the many translations and imitations it inspired, and in the praise and controversy it inspired.

== Authorship ==
The Romance of the Rose was written in two stages by two authors. In the first stage of composition, circa 1230, Guillaume de Lorris wrote 4,058 verses describing a courtier's attempts at wooing his beloved woman. The first part of the poem's story is set in a walled garden, an example of a locus amoenus, a traditional literary topos in epic poetry and chivalric romance. Forty-five years later, circa 1275, in the second stage of composition, Jean de Meun or Jehan Clopinel wrote 17,724 additional lines, in which he expanded the roles of his predecessor's allegorical personages, such as Reason and Friend, and added new ones, such as Nature and Genius. They, in encyclopedic breadth, discuss the philosophy of love.

== Reception ==
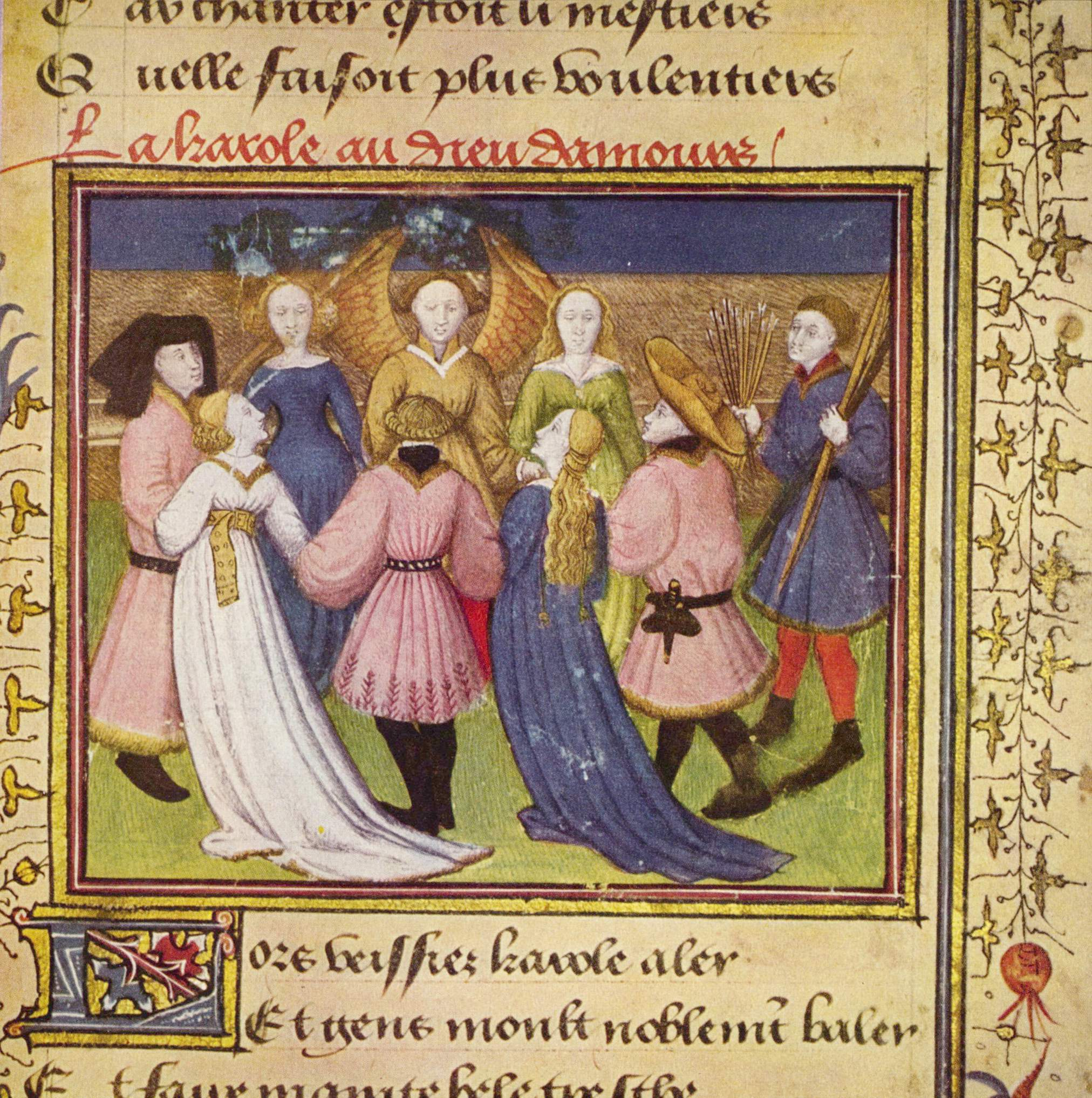
Genius of love, by the Master of the Vienna Roman de la rose, 1420–30

=== Early ===
The Romance of the Rose was both popular and controversial. One of the most widely read works in France through the Renaissance, it was possibly the most read book in Europe in the 14th and 15th centuries. Its emphasis on sensual language and imagery, along with its alleged promulgation of misogyny, provoked attacks by Jean Gerson, Christine de Pizan, Pierre d'Ailly, and many other writers and moralists of the 14th and 15th centuries. The historian Johan Huizinga has written: "It is astonishing that the Church, which so rigorously repressed the slightest deviations from dogma of a speculative character, suffered the teaching of this breviary of the aristocracy (for the Roman de la Rose was nothing else) to be disseminated with impunity."

=== Modern ===
Later reactions suggested that it had a somewhat encyclopedic quality. The nineteenth-century scholar and writer Gaston Paris wrote that it was "an encyclopedia in disorder", the British author C. S. Lewis described it as having an "encyclopedic character", and the Russian literary critic Mikhail Bakhtin wrote that the work was "encyclopedic (and synthetic) in its content". One historian wrote that while the Roman de la Rose is obviously not an encyclopedia, "it evokes one, represents one, dreams one, perhaps, with all its aspirations and limitations".

== Manuscripts and incunabula ==
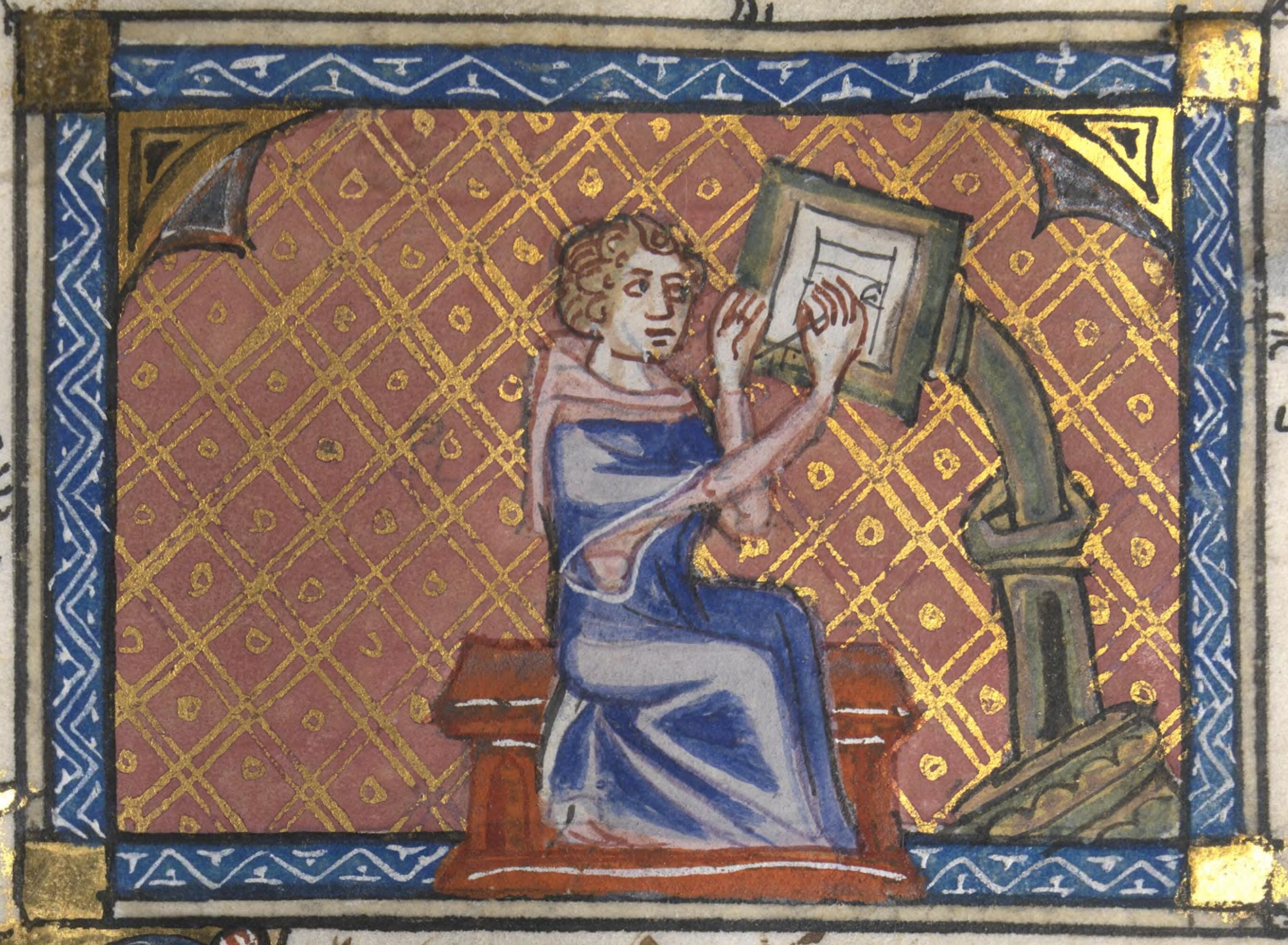
Scribe of a 14th-century copy at his writing desk. NLW MS 5016D

About three hundred manuscript copies are extant, one of the highest figures for a secular work. Many of these are illustrated, most with fewer than ten remaining illustrations, but there are a number with twenty or more illustrations, and the exceptional Burgundian British Library Harley MS 4425 has 92 large and high quality miniatures, despite a date around 1500; the text was copied by hand from a printed edition. These are by the artist known as the Master of the Prayer Books of around 1500, commissioned by Count Engelbert II of Nassau. An even later example is the Roman de la Rose of François I (New York, The Morgan Library & Museum, MS M.948), a luxury illuminated manuscript copied from a 1519 printed edition and produced in Rouen in the 1520s as a gift for King Francis I of France. With 107 miniatures, it is the latest known illuminated manuscript copy of the poem.

The peak period of production was the 14th century, but manuscript versions continued to be produced until the advent of printing, and indeed afterwards – there are at least seven manuscripts dated after 1500. There are also seven incunabula – printed editions before 1500 – the first from Geneva in about 1481, followed by two from the city of Lyons in the 1480s and four from Paris in the 1490s. An edition from Lyons in 1503 is illustrated with 140 woodcuts. Digital images of more than 140 of these manuscripts are available for study in the Roman de la Rose Digital Library.

== Translation and influence ==
Part of the story was translated from its original Old French into Middle English as The Romaunt of the Rose, which had a great influence on English literature. Chaucer was familiar with the original French text, and a portion of the Middle English translation is thought to be his work. Critics suggest that the character of "La Vieille" acted as source material for Chaucer's Wife of Bath. There were several other early translations into languages including Middle Dutch (Heinrik van Aken, c. 1280). Il Fiore is a "reduction" of the poem into 232 Italian sonnets by a "ser Durante", sometimes thought to have been Dante, although this is generally thought unlikely. Dante never mentions the Roman, but is often said to have been highly conscious of it in his own work. In 1900, the pre-Raphaelite F. S. Ellis translated the whole of the poem into English verse, with the exception of a section describing a sexual encounter, which he included in an appendix in Old French with the note that he "believes that those who will read them will allow that he is justified in leaving them in the obscurity of the original". C. S. Lewis's 1936 study The Allegory of Love renewed interest in the poem. In 2023, an opera inspired by the poem was premiered by American composer Kate Soper.

== Gallery ==
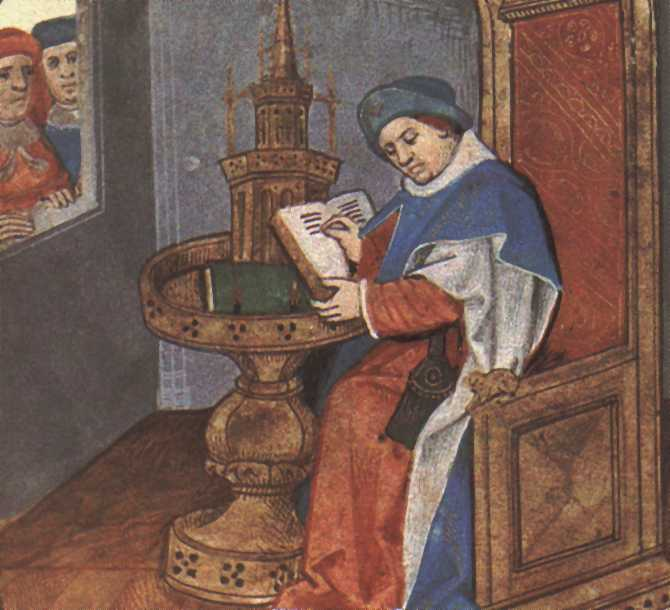
Miniature from a manuscript of the Roman de la Rose (Oxford, Bodleian Library, MS. Douce 195), folio 1r, portrait of Guillaume de Lorris.

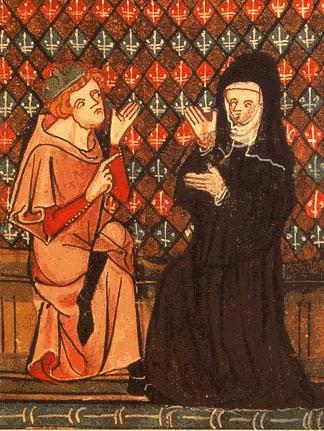
Abélard and Héloïse in a 14th-century manuscript of the Roman de la Rose

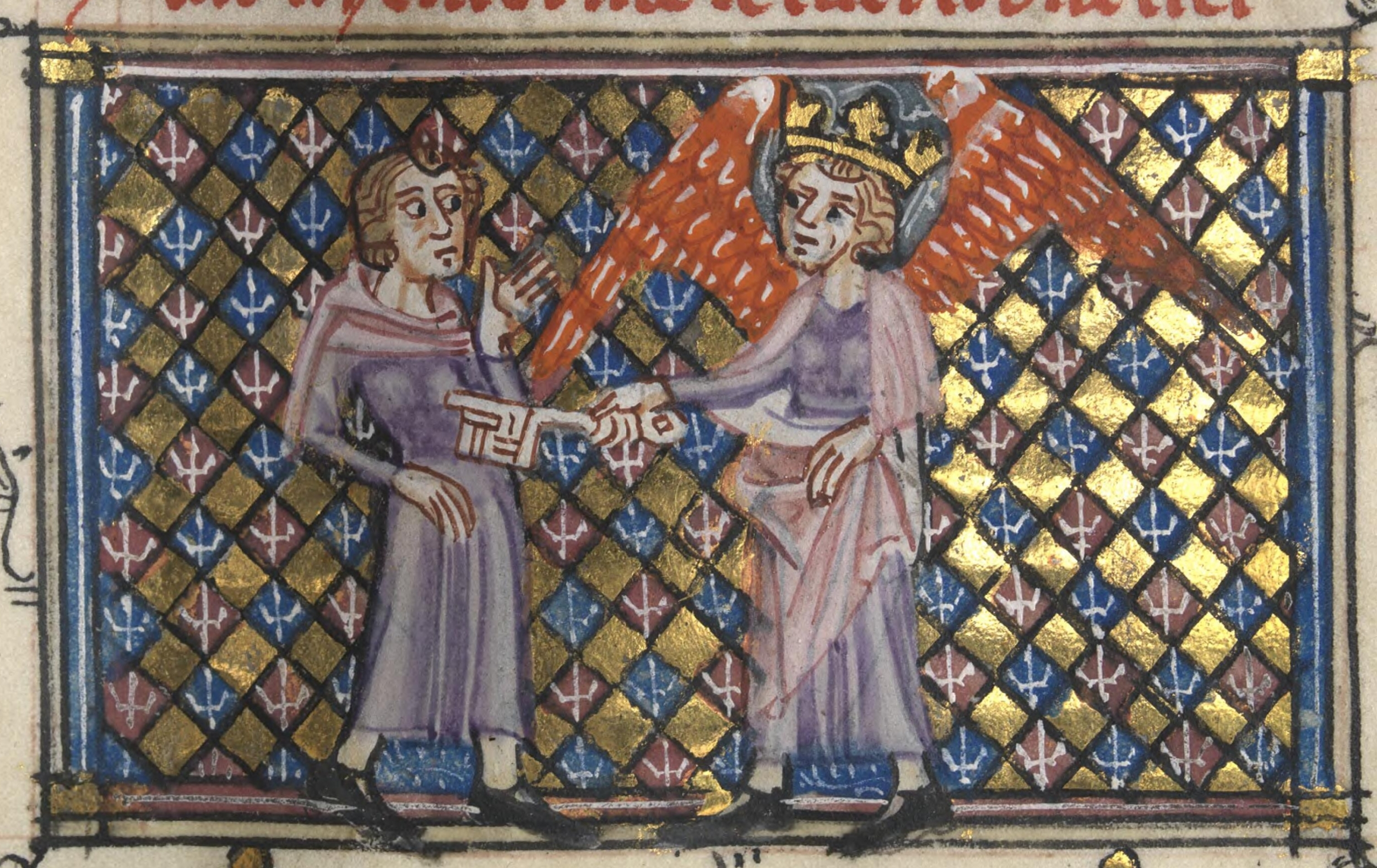
The God of Love locks the Lover's heart. f. 15r.b, Roman de la Rose MS NLW 5016D

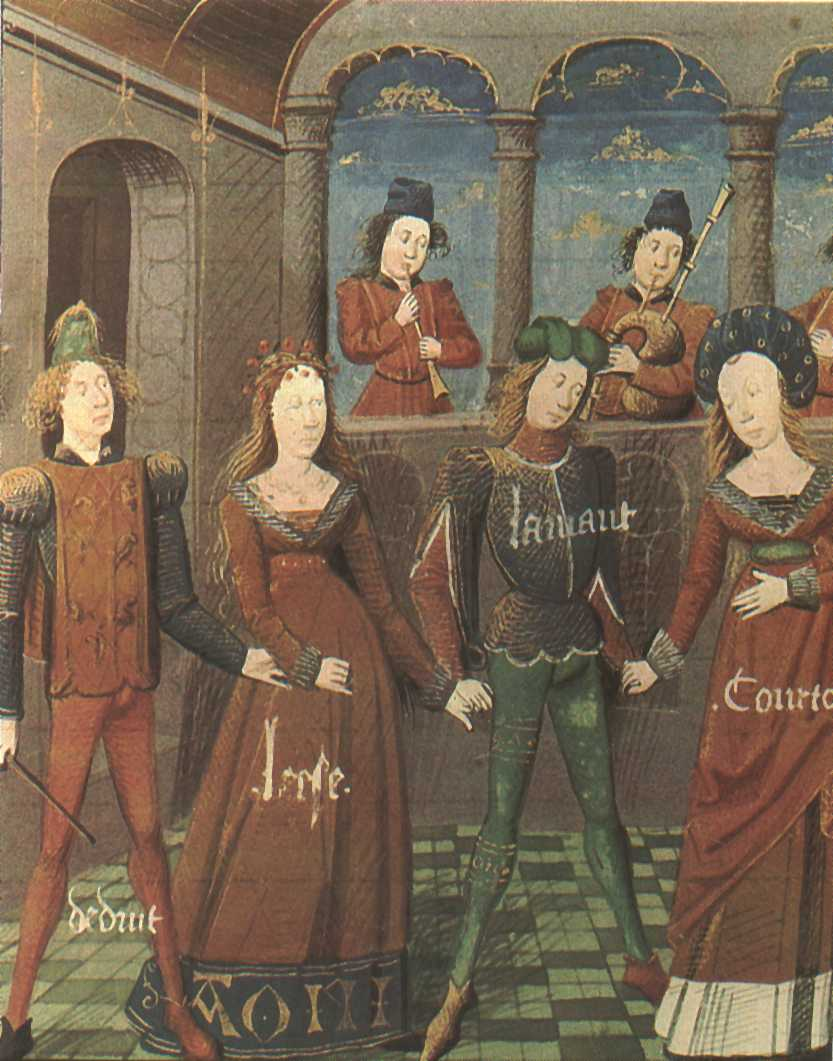
The characters Mirth and Gladness lead a dance, in a miniature image from a manuscript of The Romance of the Rose in the Bodleian Library (MS. Douce 364, folio 8r)

== Editions ==
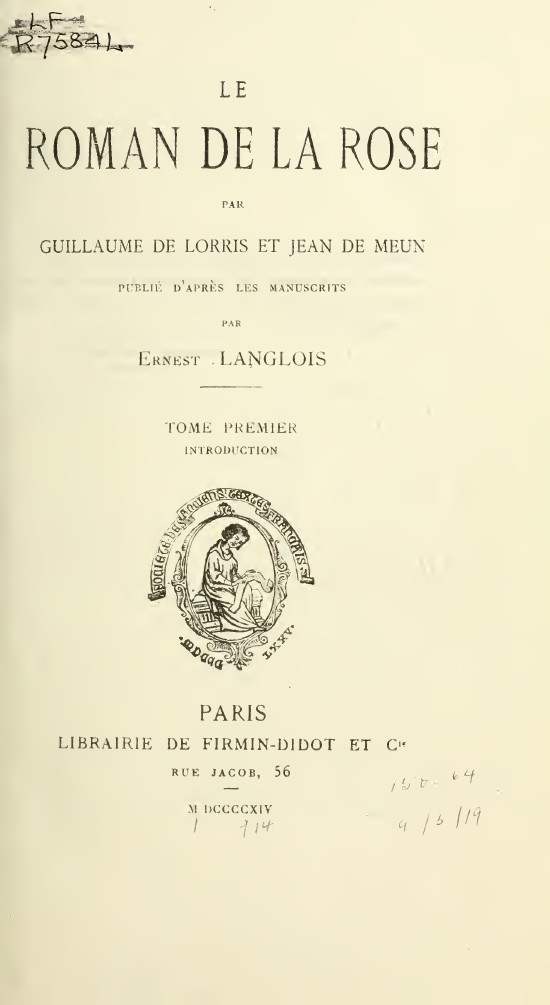
Roman de la Rose (ed. 1914)

- Langlois, Ernest, ed. Le Roman de la Rose par Guillaume de Lorris et Jean de Meun. 5 vols. Société des Anciens Textes Français. Paris: Firmin Didot, 1914–24.
- Lecoy, Félix, ed. Le Roman de la Rose par Guillaume de Lorris et Jean de Meun. 3 vols. Classiques français du Moyen Âge. Paris: Champion, 1965–70.
- Strubel, Armand, ed., trans, and annot. Le Roman de la Rose. Lettres gothiques, 4533. Paris: Librairie Générale Française – Livre de Poche, 1992. ISBN 2-253-06079-8

== English translations ==
- Robbins, Harry W., trans. The Romance of the Rose. New York: Dutton, 1962.
- Dahlberg, Charles, trans. The Romance of the Rose. Princeton: Princeton UP, 1971. ISBN 0-691-06197-1
- Horgan, Frances, trans. and annot. The Romance of the Rose. Oxford World's Classics. Oxford: Oxford UP, 1999. ISBN 0-19-283948-9

== See also ==
- Ars Amatoria - the 'art of love'
- Jeanne Montbaston (fl. 1353) French illustrator
