= Jean de Meun =

French author (1240–1305)

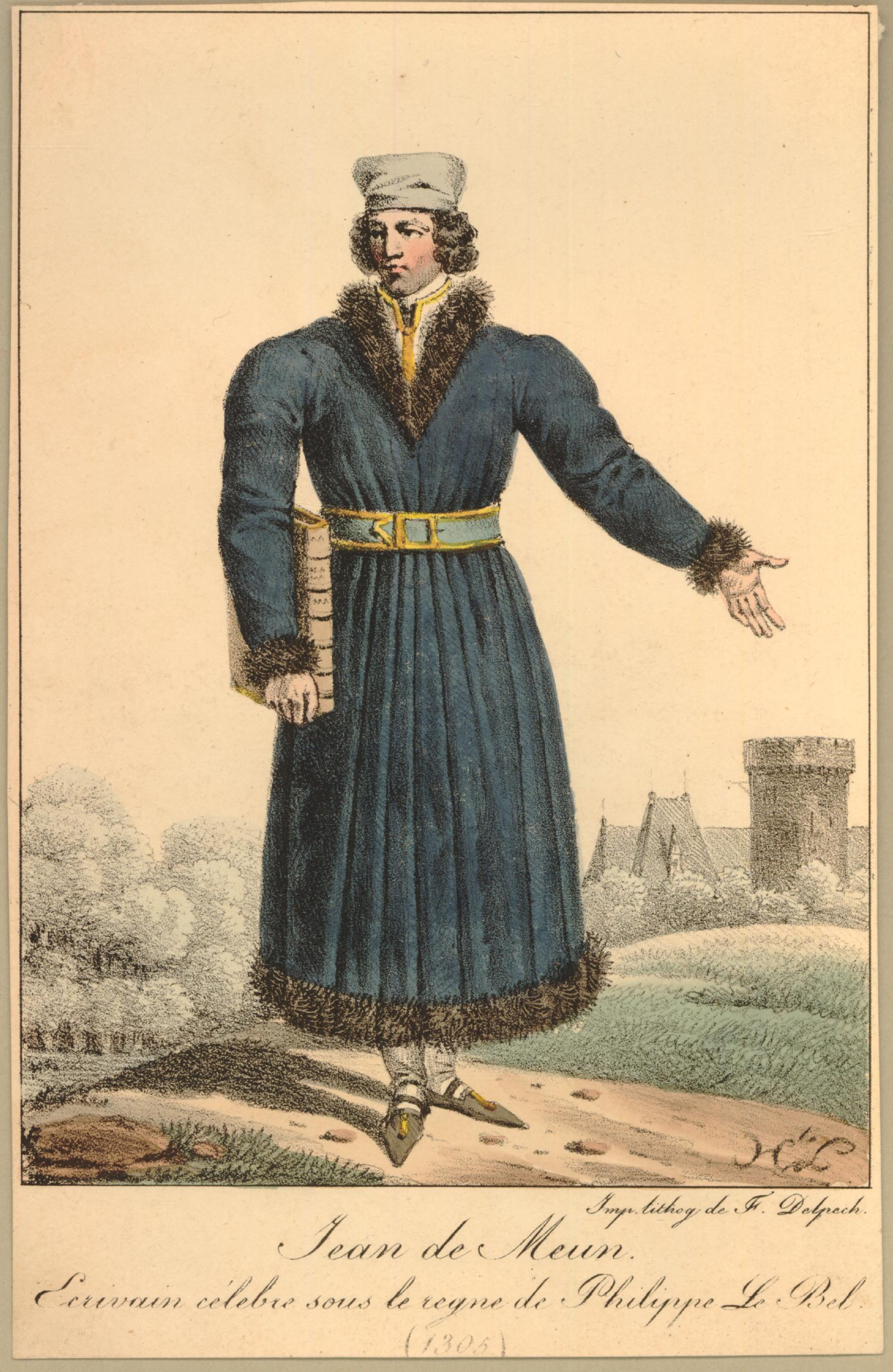
Jean de Meung

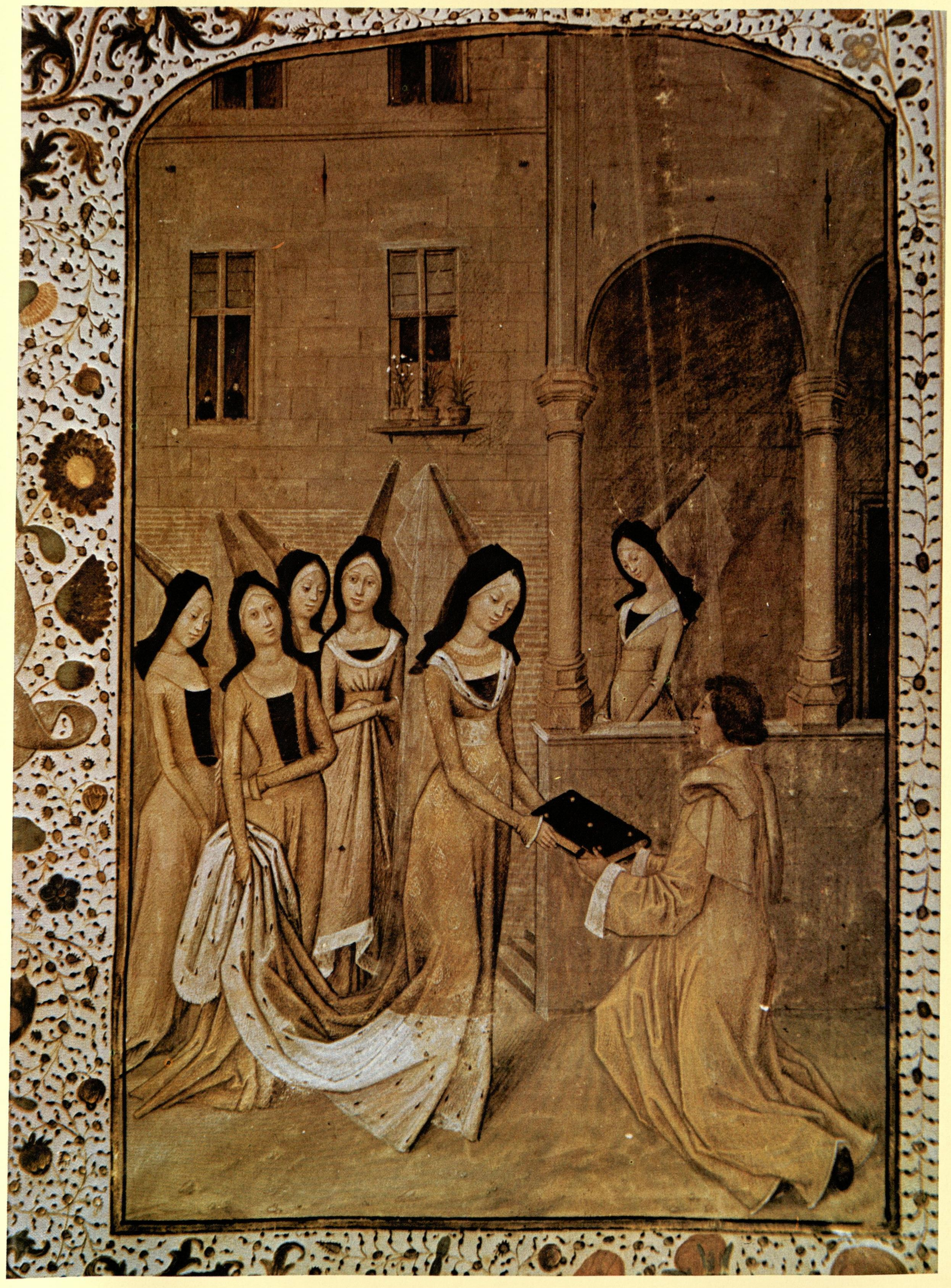
Jean de Meun presents his French translation of Boethius' Consolation of Philosophy to Margaret of Anjou in a fanciful miniature from the 15th-century manuscript Jena, Bibliothek der Friedrich-Schiller-Universität, Ms. fol. 85

Jean de Meun (or de Meung, French: [ʒɑ̃ də mœ̃]) (c. 1240 – c. 1305) was a French author best known for his continuation of the Roman de la Rose.

== Life ==
He was born Jean Clopinel or Jean Chopinel at Meung-sur-Loire. Tradition asserts that he studied at the University of Paris. He was, like his contemporary, Rutebeuf, a defender of Guillaume de Saint-Amour and a bitter critic of the mendicant orders. Jean de Meung says that in his youth he composed songs that were sung in every public place and school in France.

Most of his life seems to have been spent in Paris, where he possessed, in the Rue Saint-Jacques, a house with a tower, court and garden, which was described in 1305 as the house of the late Jean de Meun, and was then bestowed by a certain Adam d'Andely on the Dominicans. He was buried in the now-demolished church of Paris's Dominican monastery, which was also on Rue Saint-Jacques.

== Roman de la Rose ==
In the enumeration of his own works he places first his continuation of the Roman de la Rose of Guillaume de Lorris. The date of this second part (lines 4,089–21,780) is generally fixed between 1268 and 1285 by a reference in the poem to the death of Manfred and Conradin, executed in 1268 by order of Charles of Anjou (d. 1285) who is described as the present king of Sicily. M. F. Guillon (Jean Clopinel, 1903). However, considering the poem primarily as a political satire, places it in the last five years of the 13th century.

Jean de Meun doubtless edited the work of his predecessor, Guillaume de Lorris, before using it as the starting-point of his own vast poem, running to 19,000 lines. The continuation of Jean de Meun is a satire on the monastic orders, on celibacy, on the nobility, the papal see, the excessive pretensions of royalty, and especially on women and marriage. Guillaume had been the servant of love, and the exponent of the laws of "courtoisie"; Jean de Meun added an "art of love," describing with brutality the supposed vices of women and the means by which men may outwit them. Jean de Meun embodied the mocking, sceptical spirit of the fabliaux. He did not share in current superstitions, he had no respect for established institutions, and he scorned the conventions of feudalism and romance. His poem shows in the highest degree, in spite of the looseness of its plan, the faculty of keen observation, of lucid reasoning and exposition, and it entitles him to be considered the greatest of French medieval poets. He handled the French language with an ease and precision unknown to his predecessors, and the length of his poem was no bar to its popularity in the 13th and 14th centuries.

Part of its vogue was no doubt because the author, who had mastered practically all the scientific and literary knowledge of his contemporaries in France, had found room in his poem for a great amount of useful information and for numerous citations from classical authors. The book was attacked by Guillaume de Deguileville in his Pèlerinage de la vie humaine (c. 1330), long a favorite work both in England and France, by Jean Gerson, and by Christine de Pisan in her Épître au dieu d'amour. It also found energetic defenders.

Part of Jean's poem was translated into Middle English verse by Chaucer as The Romaunt of the Rose. The whole poem was translated into Modern English verse by F. S. Ellis and later by Charles Dahlberg.

== Other works ==
Jean de Meun translated in 1284 the treatise De re militari of Vegetius into French as Le livre de Végèce de l'art de chevalerie, which itself was shortly after versified by Jean Priorat. He also produced a spirited version, the first in French, of the letters of Abélard and Héloïse. A 14th-century manuscript of this translation in the Bibliothèque Nationale has annotations by Petrarch. His translation of the De consolatione philosophiae of Boethius is preceded by a letter to Philip IV in which he enumerates his earlier works, two of which are lost: De spirituelle amitié from the De spirituali amicitia of Aelred of Rievaulx (d. 1166), and the Livre des merveilles d'Hirlande from the Topographia Hibernica, or De Mirabilibus Hiberniae of Giraldus Cambrensis (Gerald de Barri). His last poems are doubtless his Testament and Codicille. The Testament is written in quatrains in monorhyme, and contains advice to the different classes of the community.
