= Frederick Startridge Ellis =

English bookseller and author

Frederick Startridge Ellis (1830–1901) was an English bookseller, publisher and author.

== Life ==
The sixth son of Joseph Ellis, hotel-keeper, of Richmond, was born there on 7 June 1830. He entered, at the age of sixteen, the business of Edward Lumley of Chancery Lane, and afterwards became assistant to C. J. Stewart, a bookseller of King William Street, Strand, London from whom he acquired his knowledge of books. In 1860 he went into business for himself at 33 King Street, Covent Garden, and in 1871 took into partnership G. M. Green (1841–1872), who had been through the same training.

After the death of Green in 1872, Ellis took on premises at 29 New Bond Street, previously occupied by T. & W. Boone, and carried on business, mainly in old books and manuscripts; his next partner was David White, who retired in 1884. For many years Ellis was official buyer for the British Museum, which brought him into rivalry with the rest of the trade opponents in auction rooms.

In 1885 Ellis retired from business, and his stock of rarities was sold by Sotheby's for about £16,000. He was succeeded in business by his nephew G. I. Ellis.

Ellis died at Sidmouth on 26 February 1901, after a short illness, in his seventy-first year.

== Associations ==
Ellis had a wide circle of literary and artistic friends. He was a publisher, on a small scale, and brought out works of William Morris and Dante Gabriel Rossetti, who became close friends. Among other associates were A. C. Swinburne, Edward Burne-Jones and John Ruskin, whose Stray Letters to a London Bibliopole were addressed to Ellis and republished by him (1892)—Ruskin called him "Papa Ellis". It was in 1864 that Morris was first introduced by Swinburne to Ellis, and Ellis was one of the poet's executors.

== Works ==
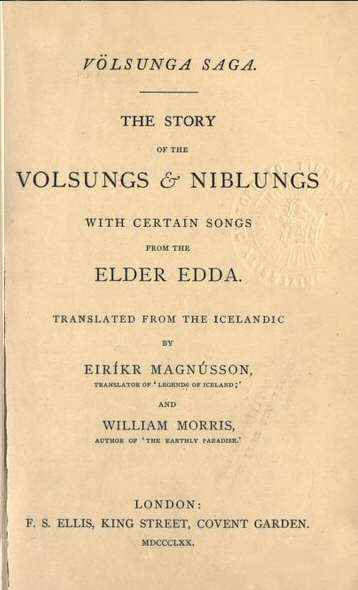
Among the books published by Ellis is Völsunga Saga: the story of the Volsungs & Niblungs, with certain songs from the Elder Edda translated by Eiríkr Magnússon and William Morris, 1870

Henry Huth entrusted to Ellis the editing of the catalogue of his famous library, which was printed in 1880 (5 vols.); the English books were catalogued by William Carew Hazlitt, those in other languages by Ellis. Another catalogue compiled by Ellis was a Descriptive Catalogue of a collection of drawings and etchings by Charles Meryon, formed by the Rev. J. J. Heywood (1880, privately printed). He also produced Horæ Pembrochianæ: some account of an illuminated MS. of the Hours of the B.V.M., written for William Herbert, first earl of Pembroke, about 1440 (1880), and a biographical notice appended to an account of The Hours of Albert of Brandenburg, by William Henry James Weale (1883).

After his retirement from business, Ellis spent his time writing. For the Shelley Society he wrote An Alphabetical Table of Contents to Shelley's Poetical Works (1888); and he devoted six years to compiling A Lexical Concordance to the Poetical Works of P. B. Shelley (1892). He was a supporter of William Morris's Kelmscott Press, and read the proofs of the folio edition of Chaucer's Works (1896). He edited many other productions for the Press, including George Cavendish's Life of Wolsey (1893); William Caxton's Golden Legend (1892), which also appeared in the "Temple Classics" (1899 and 1900). He also wrote a metrical adaptation of Caxton's Reynard the Fox, (1894, revised 1897), edited and translated Guillaume de Lorris's and Jean de Meun's Romance of the Rose (1900, "Temple Classics"), and H. Pengelly's Memoir, with a preface (1897); and contributed memoirs to Bernard Quaritch's Dictionary of English Book Collectors.

== Family ==
Ellis married in 1860 Caroline Augusta Flora, daughter of William Moates of Epsom, and left two sons and a daughter, who with his wife survived him.

Their daughter Phyllis Marion conducted the "herculean task" of the initial transcription of the Kelmscott edition of Caxton's Golden Legend.

== Notes ==
Attribution This article incorporates text from a publication now in the public domain: Tedder, Henry Richard (1912). "Ellis, Frederick Startridge". In Lee, Sidney (ed.). Dictionary of National Biography (2nd supplement). Vol. 1. London: Smith, Elder & Co. pp. 625–626.
