= Bernhard Egidius Konrad ten Brink =

German philologist

- Born: 12 January 1841; Amsterdam
- Died: 29 January 1892 (aged 51); Strasbourg
- Education: University of Münster, University of Bonn
- Occupation: Philologist
- Notable work: Chaucers Sprache und Verskunst

Bernhard Egidius Konrad ten Brink (12 January 1841 in Amsterdam – 29 January 1892 in Strasbourg) was a German philologist.

== Life ==
Born in the Netherlands, he attended school at Düsseldorf and Essen, studied for half a year at the University of Münster, and then moved to the University of Bonn, where his teachers included Friedrich Diez and Nicolaus Delius. After finishing his doctoral dissertation, "Coniectanea in historiam rei metricae Francogallicae," he began to lecture at the University of Münster on the philology of the English and Romance languages, and defended his post-doctoral thesis (Habilitation) on the Roman de Rou. In 1870 he became professor of modern languages at the University of Marburg, and after the reconstitution of Strassburg University as Kaiser-Wilhelm-Universität was appointed the very first Professor of English on the European continent. In 1874 he began to edit, in collaboration with Wilhelm Scherer, Ernst Martin and Erich Schmidt, Quellen und Forschungen zur Sprach- und Kulturgeschichte der germanischen Völker, a book series meant to assist the German government in the Germanizing of Strasbourg and Alsace-Lorraine. While he continued to lecture on French and English literature, he smartly focused his research on the father of English poetry, Geoffrey Chaucer.

In 1877, he published Chaucer: Studien zur Geschichte seiner Entwickelung und zur Chronologie seiner Schriften, a study which analyzed Chaucer's literary models and verse forms to determine the later widely accepted division of the poet's works into three periods: a first period during which he was mostly influenced by French models as well as by Ovid; a second period during which his main inspiration came from Italian models (Dante, Boccaccio, Petrarch); and a third period of mature literary production.

In 1884, he published Chaucers Sprache und Verskunst, the first full-fledged investigation of Chaucer's grammar and metrics and an achievement that guaranteed him a place of honor as recently as 1987, in the General Bibliography of the Riverside Chaucer, the most widely used edition of Chaucer in the world. English-language publishing houses, such as Henry Holt & Company, N.Y., and G. Bell & Sons, London, published English translations of his works on Early English Literature during these years.

He also published critical editions of the General Prologue of the Canterbury Tales and the Compleynte unto Pity. Ten Brink's work stimulated a revival of Chaucer study in the United Kingdom as well as in Germany, and to him was indirectly due the foundation of the English Chaucer Society. In addition, he made important contributions to the study of Shakespeare and Beowulf and authored one of the first scholarly histories of English literature. His international scholarly reputation as well as his efforts at Germanizing the University of Strasbourg contributed to his appointment as Rektor (President) of his institution in 1890.

Together with Julius Zupitza, Eugen Kölbing, and Ewald Flügel, ten Brink helped found modern English Studies.
