= Guillaume de Lorris =

French scholar and poet

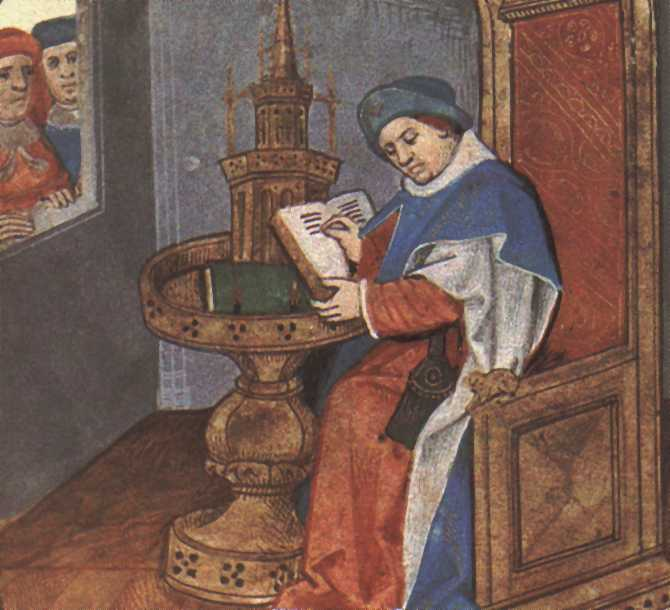
Portrait of Guillaume de Lorris from a manuscript of the Roman de la Rose in the Bodleian Library (Douce 195, folio 1r).

Guillaume de Lorris (c. 1200 – c. 1240) was a French scholar and poet from Lorris. He was the author of the first section of the Roman de la Rose. Little is known about him, other than that he wrote the earlier section of the poem around 1230, and that the work was completed forty years later by Jean de Meun. He is only known by mention of Jean de Meun, (de Meung in French), in Roman de la Rose.

de Lorris' poem was translated into Middle English verse by Chaucer, and into Modern English verse by F. S. Ellis.

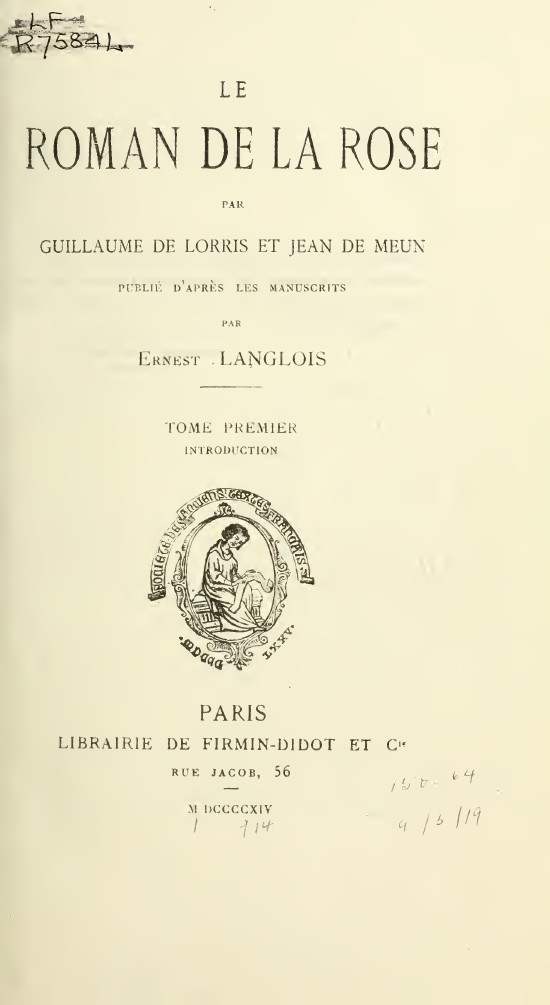
Roman de la Rose (ed. 1914)
