= List of mythological objects =

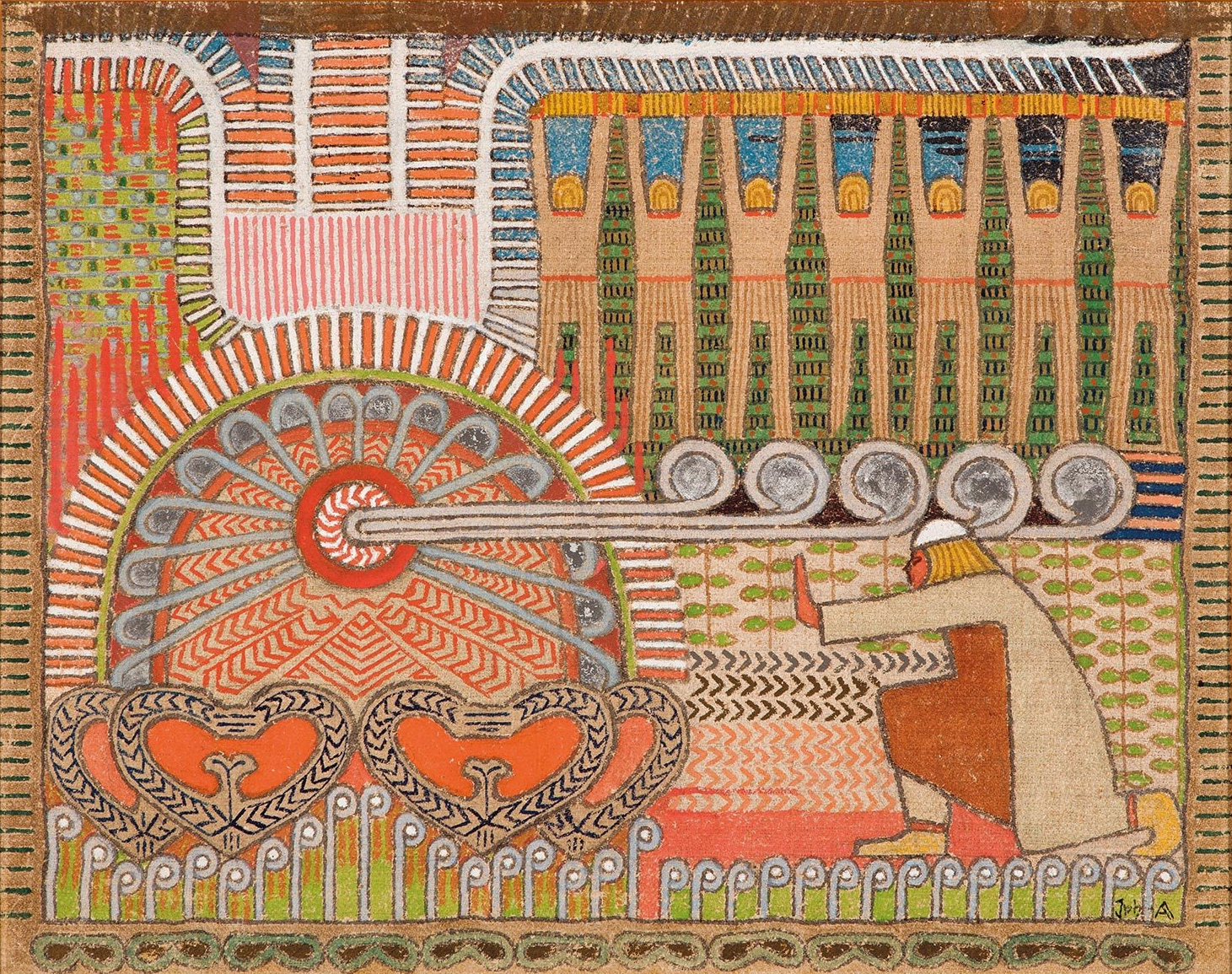
Sampo, a magical artifact of indeterminate type constructed by Ilmarinen that brought riches and good fortune to its holder, in the Finnish epic poetry Kalevala (The Forging of the Sampo, Joseph Alanen, 1911)

Mythological objects encompass a variety of items (e.g. weapons, armor, clothing) found in mythology, legend, folklore, tall tale, fable, religion, spirituality, superstition, and the paranormal from across the world. This list is organized according to the category of object.

== Armor ==
=== Armor ===
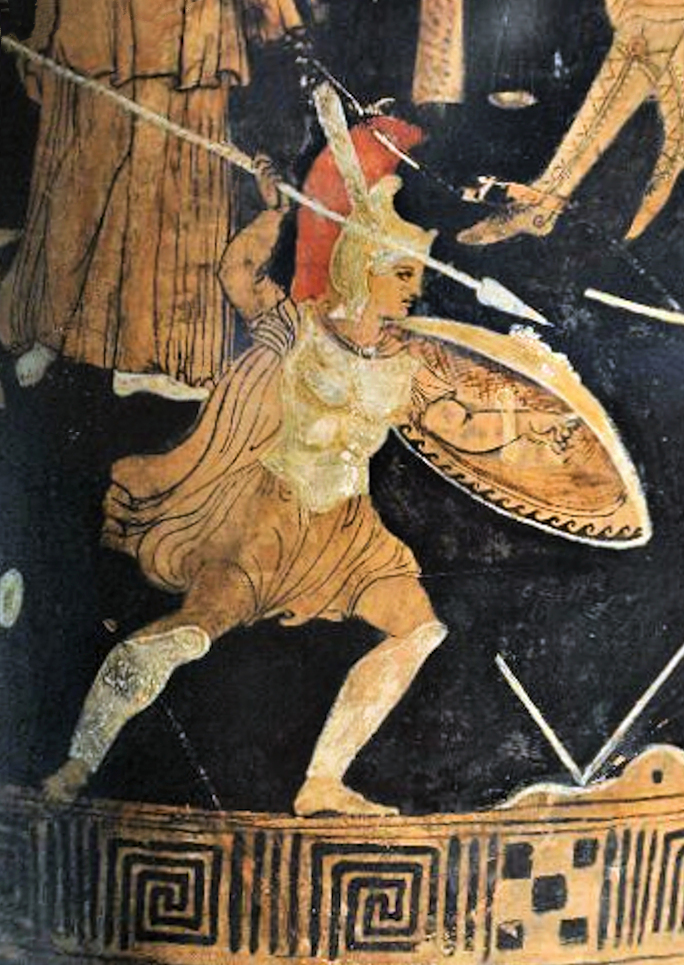
Achilles wearing his armor

- Armor of Achilles, created by Hephaestus and said to be impenetrable. (Greek mythology)
- Armor of Beowulf, a mail shirt made by Wayland the Smith. (Anglo-Saxon mythology)
- Armor of Örvar-Oddr, an impenetrable "silken mailcoat". (Norse mythology)
- Babr-e Bayan, a suit of armor that Rostam wore in wars described in the Persian epic Shahnameh. The armor was invulnerable against fire, water and weapons. (Persian mythology)
- Golden Coat of Chainmail, part of Fafnir's treasure which Sigurd took after he slew the dragon. (Norse mythology)
- Green Armor, protects the wearer from physical injuries. (Arthurian legend)
- Kavacha, the armor of Karna that was granted to him by his father Surya at birth. (Hindu mythology)
- Armor of Diomedes, made of bronze, that Diomedes exchanged with the golden armor of Glaucus. (Greek mythology)

=== Helmets ===
- Helmet of Rostam, upon which was fixed the head of the white giant Div-e-Sepid, from the Persian epic Shahnameh. (Persian mythology)
- Helm of Awe (also Helm of Terror or Ægishjálmr), an Icelandic magical stave. A physical object called "Helm of Terror" is referenced as one item Sigurd takes from the dragon Fafnir's hoard after he slays him in the Völsunga saga. (Norse mythology)
- Huliðshjálmr, a concealing helmet of the dwarves. (Norse mythology)
- Tarnhelm, a magic helmet giving the wearer the ability to change form or become invisible. Used by Alberich in Der Ring des Nibelungen. (Continental Germanic mythology)
- Goswhit, the helmet of King Arthur, passed down to him from Uther Pendragon. (Arthurian legend)
- Sun Wukong's magical headband, a magical headband which, once put on, can never be removed. With a special chant, the band will tighten and cause unbearable pain. (Chinese mythology)
- Kappa's plate (Kappa no sara), the easiest way to defeat a kappa is to make it spill the water from the sara on top of its head. The sara is filled with water that is the source of its power. (Japanese mythology)

==== Headgear from Greek mythology ====
- Cap of invisibility (also Helm of Darkness or Helm of Hades), which can turn the wearer invisible. In addition to its owner, the god of the underworld Hades, wearers of the cap in Greek myths include Athena, the goddess of wisdom; the messenger god Hermes, and the hero Perseus.
- Ariadne's diadem, a diadem given to her by her husband Dionysus that was made by Hephaestus as a wedding present.

=== Shields ===
- Shield of El Cid, a shield which bears the image of a fierce shining golden dragon.
- Svalinn, a shield which stands before the sun and protects Earth from burning. If the shield were to fall from its frontal position, the mountains and seas would burn up. (Norse mythology)
- Dubán, the shield of Cú Chulainn. (Irish mythology)
- Han Feizi's shield, from a Chinese parable that tells of a man who was trying to sell a spear and a shield. When asked how good his spear was, he claimed it could pierce any shield. Then, when asked how good his shield was, he claimed it could defend from all spear attacks. When he was asked what would happen if his spear should strike his shield, the seller could not answer. This led to the idiom of "zìxīang máodùn" (自相矛盾, "from each-other spear shield"), or "self-contradictory". (Chinese folklore)
- Oba's shield, which the deity Ọba uses to cover her right ear. (Yoruba mythology)

==== Shields from Arthurian legend ====
- Pridwen (also Wynebgwrthucher), the shield of King Arthur.
- Shield of Joseph of Arimathea, according to Arthurian legend, was carried by three maidens to Arthur's castle where it was discovered by Sir Percival. In Perlesvaus he uses it to defeat the Knight of the Burning Dragon.
- Shield of Judas Maccabee, a red shield emblazoned with a golden eagle. According to Arthurian legend the same shield was later found and used by Gawain after he defeated an evil knight.
- Shield of Evalach, a white shield belonging to King Evalach. Josephus of Arimathea painted a red cross upon it with his own blood, which granted the owner heavenly protection. It was later won by Sir Galahad.

==== Shields from Græco-Roman mythology ====
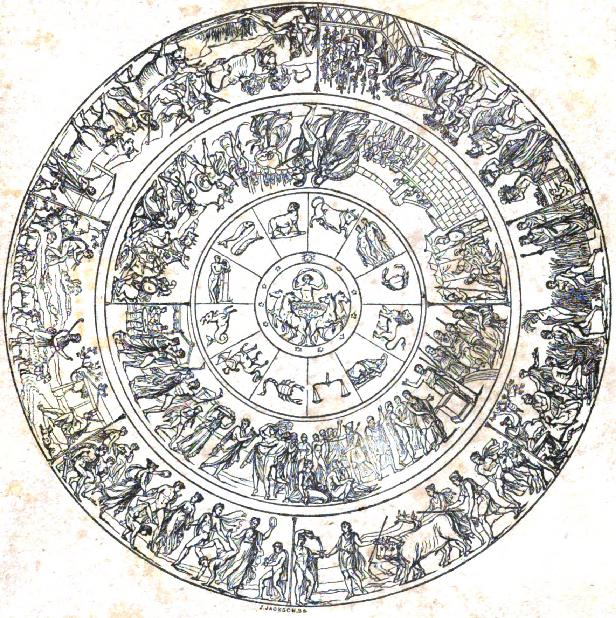
Shield of Achilles (illustration)

- Aegis, Zeus' shield, often loaned to his daughter Athena, also used by Perseus. (Greek mythology)
- Shield of Ajax, a huge shield made of seven cow-hides with a layer of bronze. (Greek mythology)
- Ancile, the shield of the Roman god Mars. One divine shield fell from heaven during the reign of Numa Pompilius, the second king of Rome. He ordered eleven copies made to confuse would-be thieves. (Roman mythology)
- Shield of Achilles, the shield that Achilles uses in his fight with Hector. (Greek mythology)
- Shield of Aeneas, the shield that Aeneas receives from Vulcan to aid in his war against Turnus.
- Shield of Heracles, the shield that Heracles uses in his fight with Cycnus. (Greek mythology)

==== Shields from Hindu mythology ====
- Khetaka, the shield of Shamba.
- Srivatsa, the shield of Vishnu, said to be manifested in the god's chest.

=== Gauntlets ===
- Járngreipr (Iron Grippers), a pair of iron gauntlets used by the god Thor. (Norse mythology)

== Clothing ==
=== Crowns ===
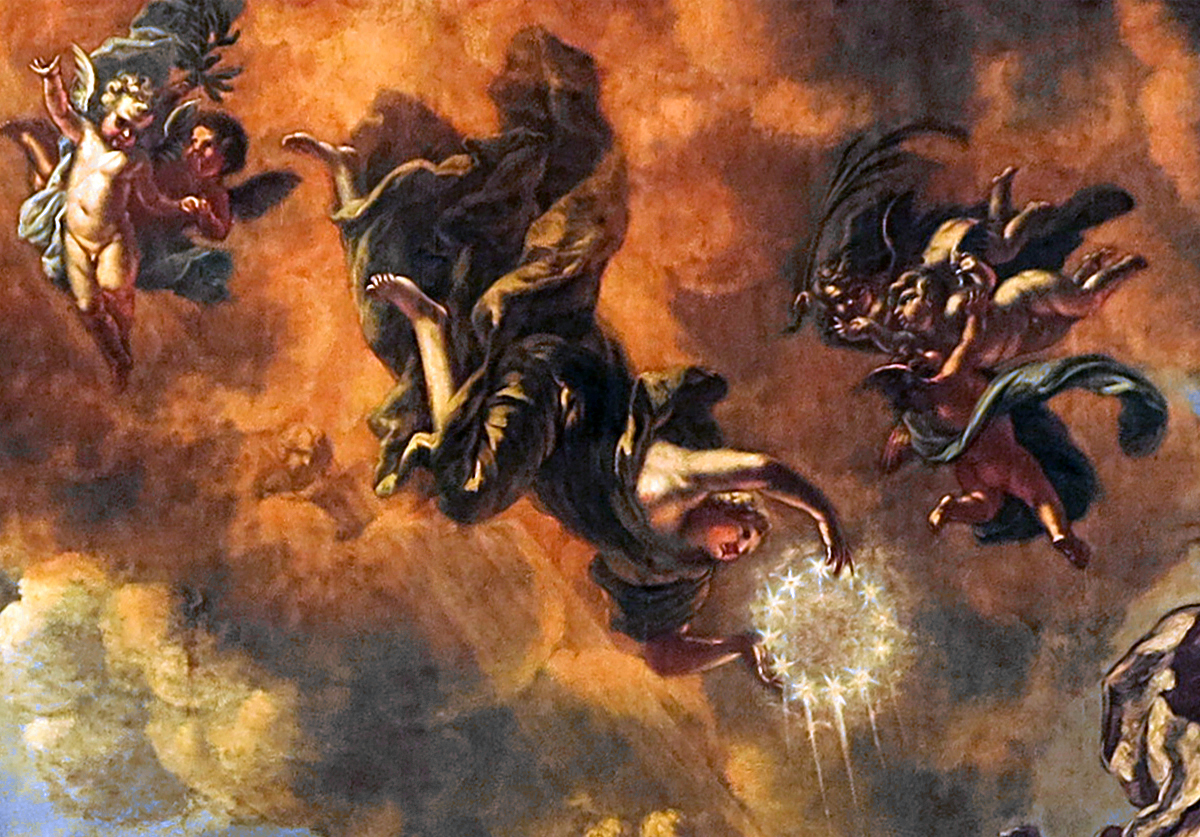
The Crown of Immortality, held by the allegorical figure Eterna (Eternity)

- Crown of Immortality, represented in art first as a laurel wreath and later as a symbolic circle of stars. It appears in a number of Baroque iconographic and allegoric works of art to indicate the wearer's immortality. (Christian mythology)
- Conquest's crown, the first of the Four Horsemen of the Apocalypse, Conquest, rides a white horse and a crown was given to him. (Christian mythology)
- Crown of twelve stars, the Woman of the Apocalypse is seen wearing a crown of twelve stars on her head. (Christian mythology)
- Crown of thorns, which was placed on the head of Jesus during his crucifixion. (Christian mythology)
- Radiate crown (also Solar crown, Sun crown, Eastern crown or Tyrant's crown), a crown or other headgear symbolizing the Sun or more generally powers associated with the Sun.
- Corona Borealis (Northern Crown), the crown was considered to represent a crown given by Dionysus to Ariadne, after she was taken from the Athenian prince Theseus. When she wore the crown at her marriage to Dionysus, he placed it in the heavens to commemorate their wedding. (Greek mythology)
- Corona Australis (Southern Crown), the crown has been associated with the myth of Bacchus and Stimula. Jupiter had impregnated Stimula, causing Juno to become jealous. Juno convinced Stimula to ask Jupiter to appear in his full splendor, which the mortal woman could not handle, causing her to burn. After Bacchus, Stimula's unborn child, became an adult and the god of wine, he honored his deceased mother by placing a wreath in the sky. (Roman mythology)

=== Belts ===
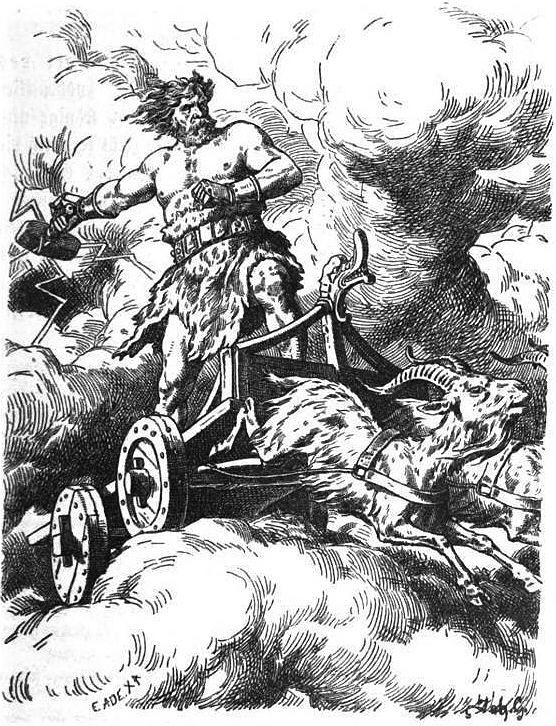
Thor wearing the magic belt Megingjörð

- Megingjörð (Power-belt), a magic belt worn by the god Thor. (Norse mythology)
- Peter Stumpp's magical belt, Peter claimed that the Devil had given him a magical belt or girdle, which enabled him to metamorphose into a werewolf. Removing the belt made him transform back to his human form. (German legend)

==== Girdles ====
- Aphrodite's Cestus, a magic girdle that enhanced the wearer's beauty and made others fall in love with the wearer. (Greek mythology)
- Girdle of Hippolyta, a girdle that was a symbol of Hippolyta's power over the Amazons, and given to her by Ares. Heracles' 9th Labor was to retrieve it. (Greek mythology)
- Tyet, the ancient Egyptian symbol of the goddess Isis. It seems to be called "the Knot of Isis" because it resembles a knot used to secure the garments that the Egyptian gods wore. (Egyptian mythology)
- Girdle of Brynhildr, Siegfried takes her girdle which makes Brynhildr lose her supernatural strength. (Norse mythology)
- Bridle of Constantine, said to be made from the nails used during the crucifixion of Christ.

=== Gloves ===
- Letter Gloves, or kirikindad were believed to have protective or magic powers. They are decorated with special patterns and are imbued with whispers and spells by the singing of the crafter making them. (Estonian mythology)

=== Veils ===
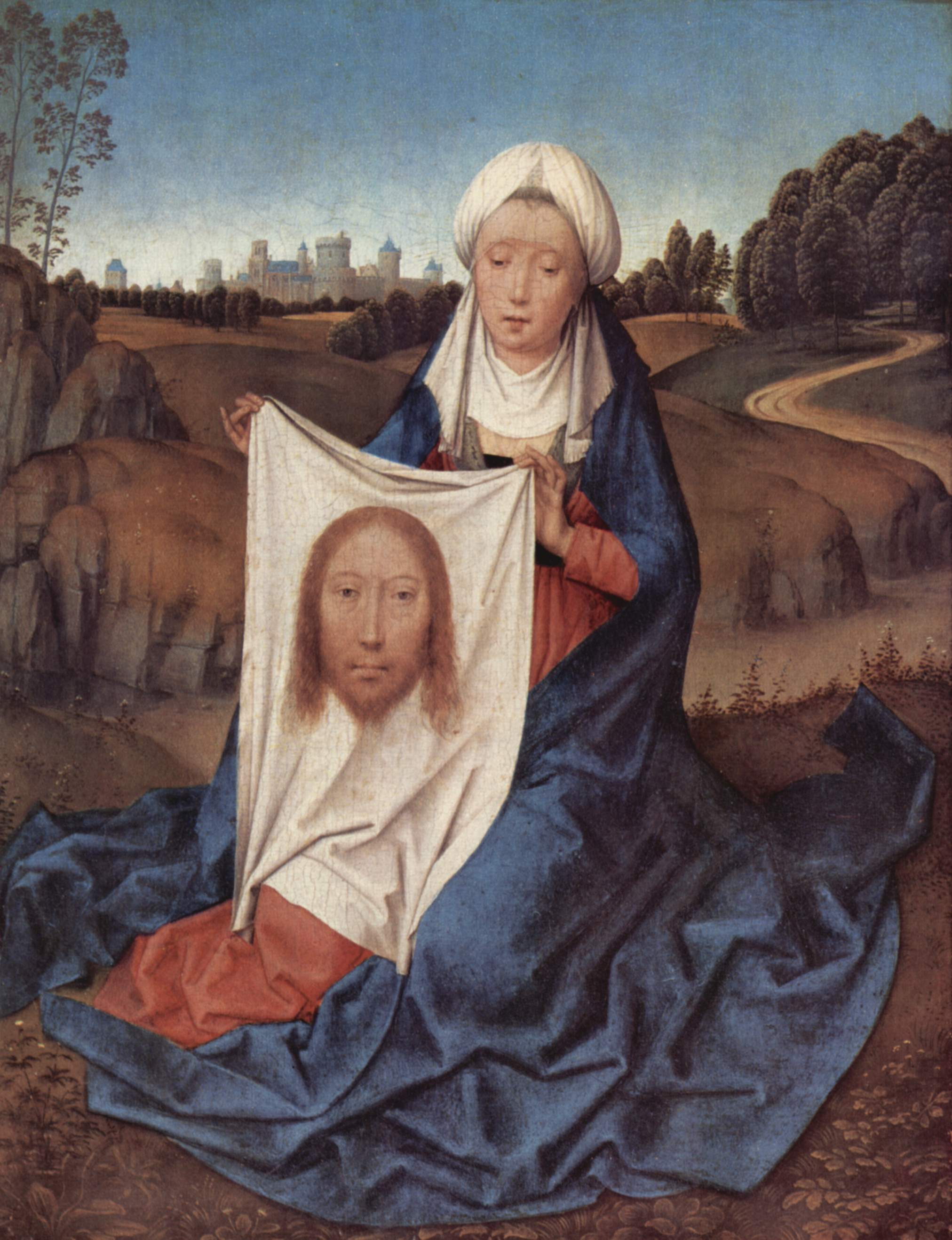
Veronica holding her veil, Hans Memling, c. 1470

- Veil of Isis, an artistic motif in which nature is personified as the goddess Isis covered by a veil, representing the inaccessibility of nature's secrets. Helena Blavatsky, in Isis Unveiled in 1877, used the metaphor for the spiritual truths that her Theosophical belief system hoped to discover, and modern ceremonial magic includes a ritual called the "Rending of the Veil" to bring the magician to a higher state of spiritual awareness. (Western esotericism)
- Veil of Veronica, according to legend, was used to wipe the sweat from Jesus' brow as he carried the cross. (Christian mythology)

=== Caps and hats ===
- Cohuleen druith: or cochaillín draíochta is a special hat worn by merrows which enables them to travel between deep water and dry land. If they lose this cap, it is said that they will lose their power to return beneath the water. (Scottish folklore)
- Winged petasos (also Winged petasus): the winged traveler hat of the messenger god Hermes. The Roman equivalent is Mercury. (Greek mythology)
- Cap of invisibility (also Cap of Hades): a cap that turns a person invisible (Greek mythology)
- Saci's cap: the red cap of the Saci which is the said source of all his magical abilities, like appearing and disappearing at will, inhuman speed (despite having just one leg) and the power to create and ride dust devils. Those who want to capture a Saci must throw a sieve over a Saci's dust devil to bind it and give a chance to remove his cap, rendering him powerless. Then he could be locked inside a bottle granting his total obedience - but not his loyalty, since the creature would always try to trick his master into giving back his cap. (Brazilian mythology)
- Hat of fingernails, or küüntest kübar is a hat belonging to Vanatühi that makes the wearer invisible. (Estonian mythology)

=== Garments ===
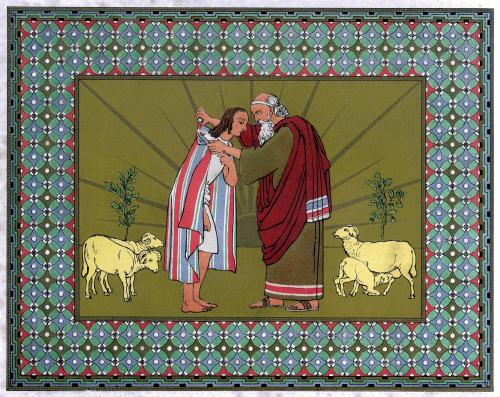
Jacob blesses Joseph and gives him the coat of many colors

- Hagoromo (Feather cloak), a colored or feathered kimono of a tennin. Tennin are unable to fly without these kimono and thus will be unable to return to Heaven. (Japanese mythology)
- Velificatio, a stylistic device used in ancient Roman art to frame a deity by means of a billowing garment. It represents "vigorous movement", an "epiphany", or "the vault of heaven", often appearing with celestial, weather, or sea deities. (Roman mythology)
- Coat of many colors, the garment that Joseph owned, which was given to him by his father, Jacob. (Jewish mythology)
- Penelope's burial shroud, which Odysseus's wife Penelope pretended to weave for her deceased father-in-law. She claimed that she would choose a suitor when the shroud was complete, but secretly unraveled it every night to delay the decision. (Greek mythology)
- Devil's green coat, given to a soldier by the Devil, who claims its pockets are always full of limitless money, as told in the tale Bearskin. (German fairy tale)

=== Footwear ===
==== Boots ====
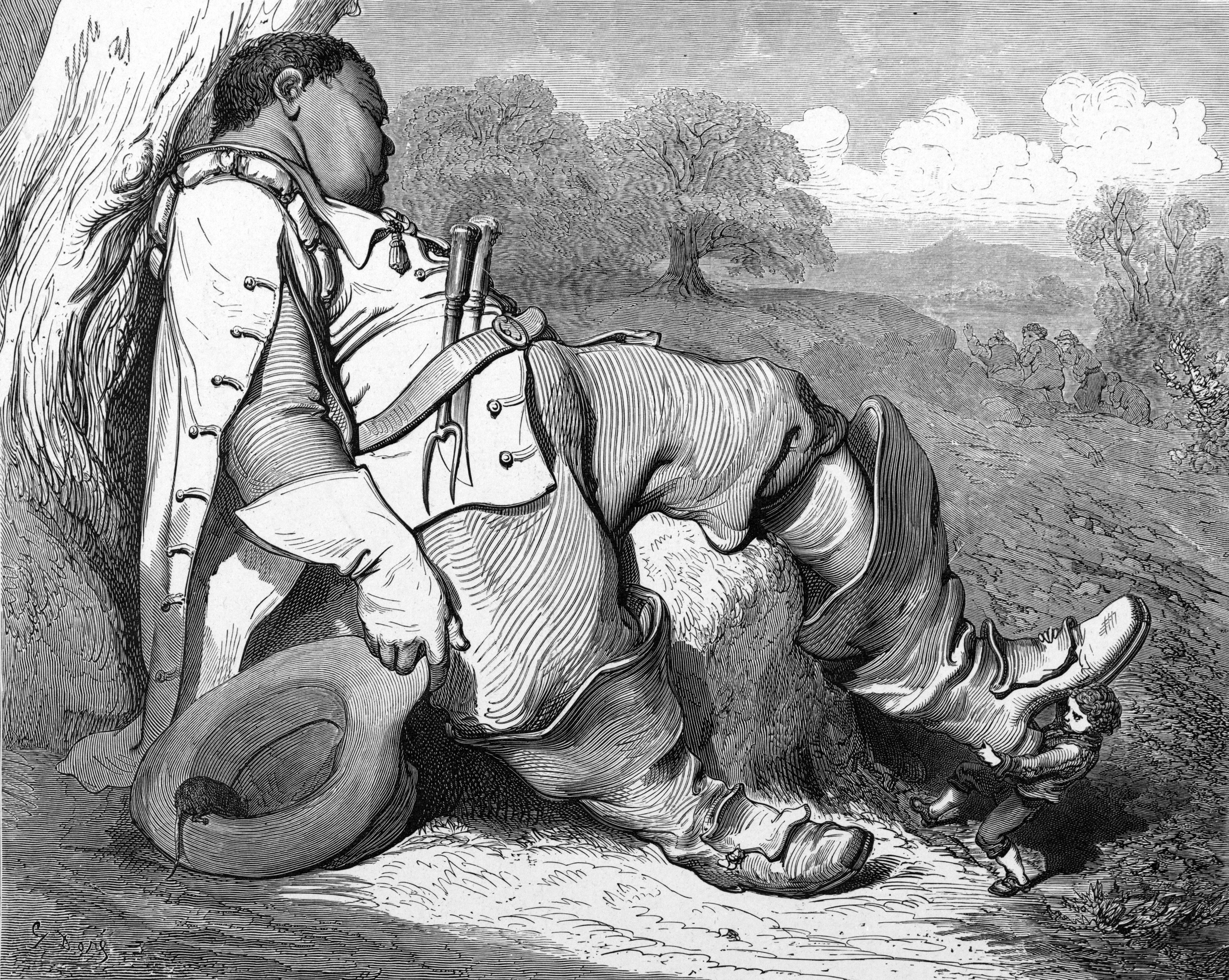
Hop-o'-My-Thumb stealing the Seven-league boots from the Ogre, by Gustave Doré

- Ǒusībùyúnlǚ (藕絲步雲履; "[Lotus-root Thread] Cloud-stepping Boots" or "~Shoes"), made of lotus fiber, these are one of the treasures of the Dragon Kings; Ào Ming gives them to Sun Wukong in order to get rid of him when he acquires the Ruyi Jingu Bang. (Chinese mythology)
- Fast-walker Boots (Cапоги-скороходы), allows the person wearing them to walk and run at an amazing pace. (Russian folklore)
- Seven-league boots, a pair of boots said to allow the wearer to make strides of seven leagues in length. (European folklore)

==== Sandals ====
- Sandals of Jesus Christ, these were among the most important relics of the Catholic Church in the Middle Ages. (Christian mythology)
- Talaria, Hermes's winged sandals which allowed him to fly. (Greek mythology)

==== Shoes ====
- Helskór (Hel-shoes), were put on the dead so that they could go to Valhöll. (Norse mythology)
- Shoes of Víðarr, which gave the god Vidar unparalleled foot protection. (Norse mythology)

=== Outerwear ===
==== Coats ====
- Babr-e Bayan, the mythical coat worn by the Persian legendary hero Rostam in combat. (Persian mythology)
- Pais Badarn Beisrydd, The Coat of Padarn Red-Coat: if a well-born man put it on, it would be the right size for him; if a churl, it would not go upon him. One of the Thirteen Treasures of the Island of Britain. (Welsh mythology)

==== Cloaks ====
- Fjaðrhamr (Feather-skin), the goddess Freyja owns a cloak of falcon feathers; cf. feather cloak § Germanic (Norse mythology).
- Swan Cloak, a magic robe made of swan feathers belonging to a swan maiden.
- Tarnkappe, Siegfried's magical cloak that made the wearer invisible (Nibelungenlied).

==== Mantles ====
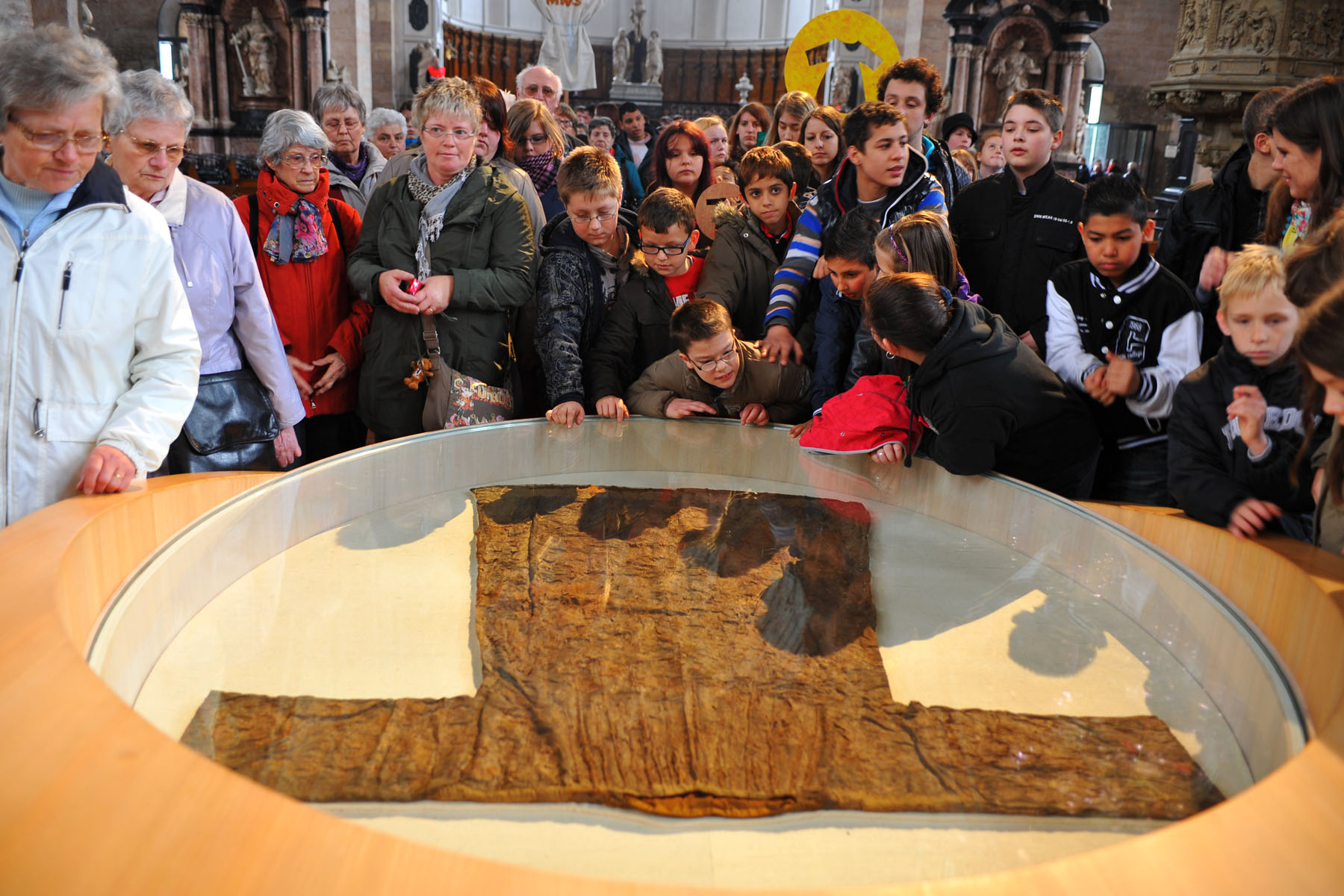
Holy Robe in Trier

- Mantle of Arthur (also Llen Arthyr yng Nghernyw), whoever was under it could not be seen, and he could see everyone. One of the Thirteen Treasures of the Island of Britain. This item is known from two other sources, the prose tales Culhwch and Olwen (c. 1100) and The Dream of Rhonabwy (early 13th century). A very similar mantle also appears in the Second Branch of the Mabinogi, in which it is used by Caswallawn to assassinate the seven stewards left behind by Bran the Blessed and usurp the throne. (Welsh mythology)
- Mantle of Elijah, In the book of 2 Kings, When Elijah struck his mantle on the Jordan River, it immediately parted the waters, making way for him and Elisha to cross. it soon fell under the hands of Elisha when Elijah was taken unto Heaven. (Abrahamic religion)
- Mantle of Tegau Gold-Breast, Tegau Gold-Breast (Tegau Eurfron, wife of Caradoc) was a Welsh heroine. Her mantle would not serve for any woman who had violated her marriage or her virginity. It would reach to the ground when worn by a faithful woman but would only hang down to the lap of an unfaithful wife. (Welsh mythology)

==== Robes ====
- Robe of the Fire-rat, a legendary robe of China that is made of the fireproof fur of the fire-rat. One of Kaguya-hime's suitor set out to search for the robe. (Japanese mythology)
- Seamless Robe of Jesus (also Holy Robe, Holy Tunic, Honorable Robe or Chiton of the Lord), the robe said to have been worn by Jesus during or shortly before his crucifixion. (Christian mythology)
- Sun robe, the Woman of the Apocalypse is clothed with the sun. (Christian mythology)

=== Pants and shirts ===
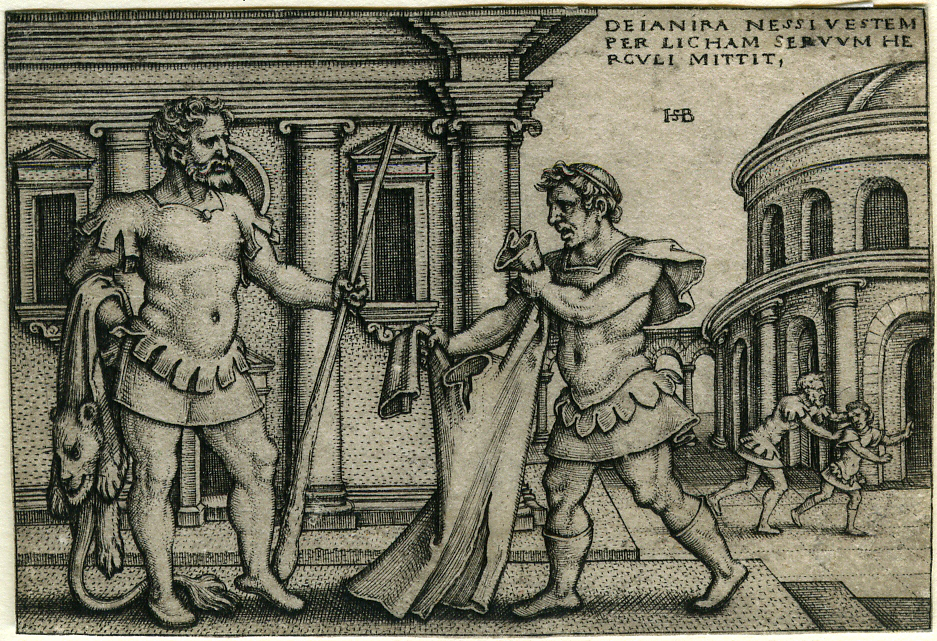
Lichas bringing the garment of Nessus to Hercules

- Nábrók (Death Underpants), a pair of pants made from the skin of a dead man, which are capable of producing an endless supply of money. (Icelandic folklore)
- Shirt of Nessus, the poisoned shirt that killed Heracles. (Greek mythology)
- Ragnar's enchanted shirt, when King Ælla threw Ragnar into the snake pit, it was claimed Ragnar was protected by an enchanted shirt that Aslaug had made. It was only when this shirt had been removed that the snakes could bite Ragnar and kill him. (Norse mythology)

== Weapons ==
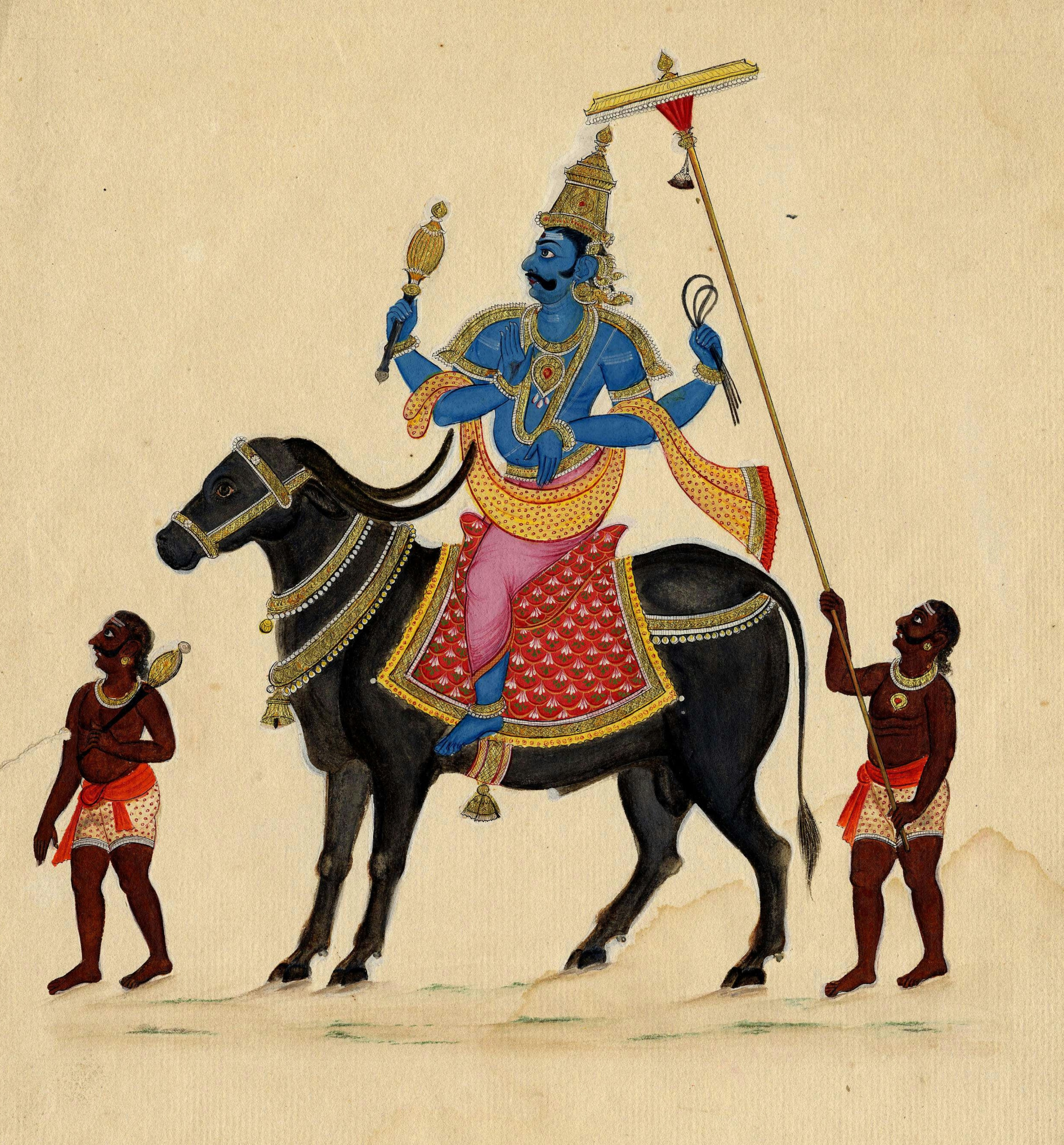
Yama with his famous Yama Pasha

- Ankusha (also Elephant Goad), an elephant goad which is one of the eight auspicious objects known as Ashtamangala. Ankusha is also an attribute of many Hindu gods, including Ganesha. (Hindu mythology, Jainism, Buddhist mythology)
- Ayudhapurusha, the anthropomorphic depiction of a divine weapon in Hindu art. Ayudhapurushas are sometimes considered as partial incarnates of their divine owners. (Hindu mythology)
- Bajiaoshan or Bashōsen (Banana Palm Fan), a giant fan made from banana leaves which has magical properties, as it can create giant whirlwinds. It was used by Princess Iron Fan. It is also one of the 5 magic weapons stolen by the brothers Golden Horned King and Silver Horned King (Chinese mythology, Journey to the West)
- Halayudha, a plough used as a weapon by Balarama. (Hindu mythology)
- Imhullu, a wind weapon used by the Assyrian god Marduk to destroy Tiamat, described in the ancient epic of creation Enûma Eliš. (Mesopotamian mythology)
- Pasha, a supernatural weapon depicted in Hindu iconography. It is used to bind a foe's arms and legs or for hunting animals. (Hindu mythology)
- Magic wand, found in the hands of powerful fairies. (Medieval legend)

Ginkaku. (Chinese mythology)

=== Swords ===
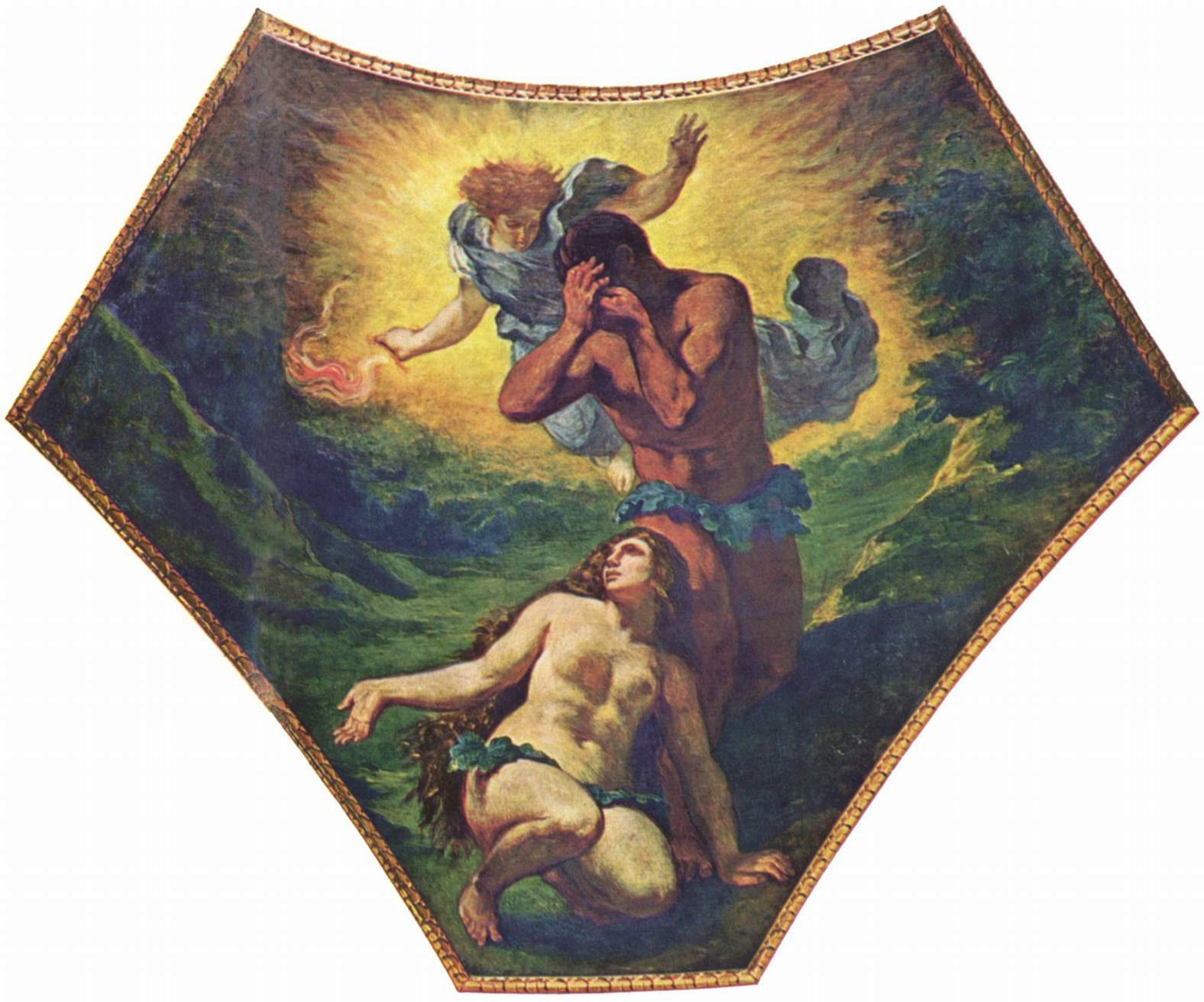
An angel (Camael) expelling Adam and Eve with a flaming sword

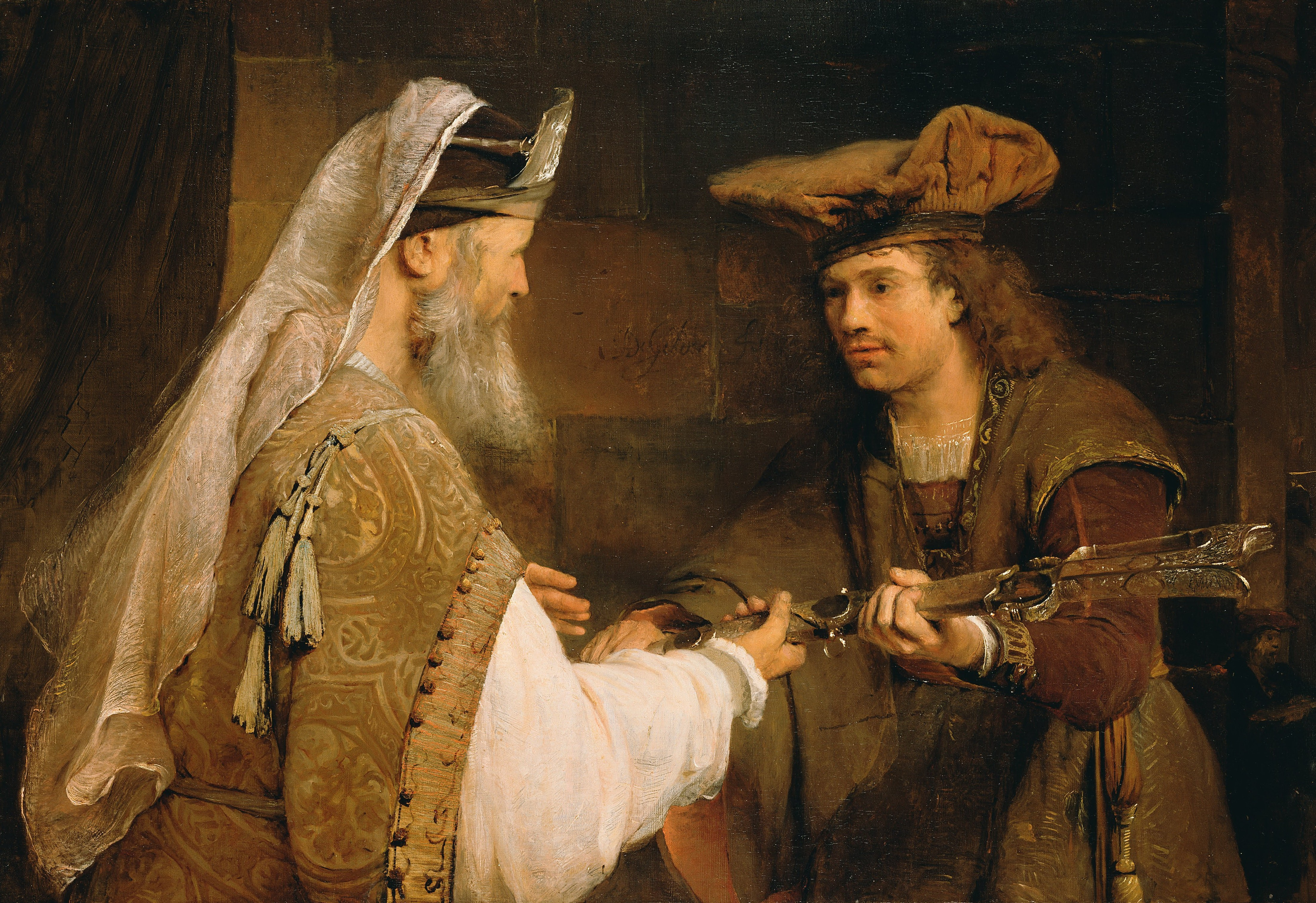
Ahimelech giving the sword of Goliath to David, by Aert de Gelder.

- Cura Si Manjakini, a sword mentioned in the legends of the Malay Annals as originally possessed by Sang Sapurba, the legendary ancestor of Malay kings. (Malay folklore)
- Flaming Sword, a sword glowing with flame by some supernatural power.
- Kalevanmiekka, Kaleva's sword. (Finnish mythology)
- Mmaagha Kamalu, a sword that belongs to the Igbo god of war Kamalu. This sword glows red when people with evil intentions are close by and it can cause tremors when struck on the ground. It gifts mere mortals victory in battle. (Igbo mythology)
- Sword of Laban, after nearly being killed by a powerful and nefarious Laban, the young prophet Nephi later finds him drunk and unconscious. He's then commanded of God to use Laban's sword to kill him as he was wicked and would hurt future generations by withholding sacred records revealing God's Plan of Happiness. The sword was made of "precious steel" with a hilt of "pure gold". After slaying Laban, Nephi put on Laban's armor to disguise himself to obtain the records, and escape the city. He would later use it as a model for manufacturing similar weapons for his people's defense. Laban's sword was passed down through the centuries to future prophets, kings, and warriors. (Book of Mormon)
- Sword of Victory (also Phra Saeng Khan Chaiyasi), the sword's history has been shrouded in myth and legend. In 1784, Chao Phraya Apai Pubet of Cambodia received the blade from a fisher who found in it in Tonle Sap when it was caught in his fishing net. He gave it to King Phutthayotfa Chulalok (Rama I) of Thailand, his suzerain at the time. According to legend, it was said that the moment the blade arrived in Bangkok, seven lightning strikes hit the city simultaneously, including the city gate, where the blade entered, and over the main gate of the Grand Palace. (Thai folklore)
- Thuận Thiên (Heaven's Will), the mythical sword of the Vietnamese King Lê Lợi, who liberated Vietnam from Ming occupation after ten years of fighting from 1418 until 1428. (Vietnamese mythology)
- War's great sword, the second of the Four Horsemen of the Apocalypse rides on a Red Horse is War, a great sword was given to him. (Book of Revelation)
- Goliath's sword, which was used by David to decapitate the fallen giant, and then given to him by the priest Achimelech when he ran away from King Shaul. (Jewish mythology)

==== Swords from Celtic mythology ====
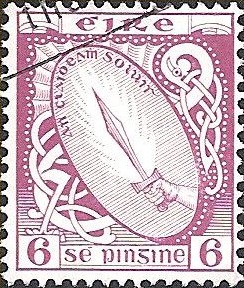
Claíomh Solais on an Ireland stamp printed in 1922

- Beagalltach (also Begallta) or "Little Fierce One", a short sword given to Diarmuid Ua Duibhne by his father Aengus. It broke in two pieces after hitting a boar with it. Paired with Móralltach.
- Caladbolg (also Caladcholg), the sword of Fergus mac Róich and powerful enough to cut the tops off three hills; related to the Caledfwlch of Welsh mythology.
- Caledfwlch, often compared to Excalibur. This sword is used by Llenlleawg Wyddel to kill Diwrnach Wyddel and his men.
- Ceard-nan Gallan, the Smith of the Branches, sword of Oisín.
- Claíomh Solais (Sword of Light), the sword of Nuada Airgeadlámh. The sword glowed with the light of the sun and was irresistible in battle, having the power to cut his enemies in half.
- Cosgarach Mhor, the Great Triumphant One, sword of Oscar.
- Crocea Mors, formerly the sword of Julius Caesar, captured by Nennius according to the legends presented by Geoffrey of Monmouth.
- Cruadh-Chosgarach, the Hard Destroying One, sword of Caílte mac Rónáin.
- Cruaidín Catutchenn, the sword of Cú Chulainn.
- Dyrnwyn (White-Hilt), the Sword of Rhydderch Hael. When drawn by a worthy or well-born man, the entire blade would blaze with fire. Rhydderch was never reluctant to hand the weapon to anyone, hence his nickname Hael "the Generous", but the recipients, as soon as they had learned of its peculiar properties, always rejected the sword.
- Fragarach (also Sword of Air, Answerer or Retaliator), forged by the gods, wielded by Manannán mac Lir and Lugh Lamfada. No armor could stop it, and it would grant its wielder command over the powers of wind.
- Mac an Luin, the Son of the Waves, sword of Fionn mac Cumhaill.
- Móralltach (also Morallta) or "Great Fierce One", a sword given to Diarmuid Ua Duibhne by his father Aengus, which left no stroke or blow unfinished at the first trial.
- Orna, the sword of the Fomorian king Tethra, which recounts the deeds done with it when unsheathed. It was taken by Ogma and it then recounted everything it had done.
- Singing Sword of Conaire Mór, a sword that would sing in battle.

==== Swords from Continental Germanic mythology ====
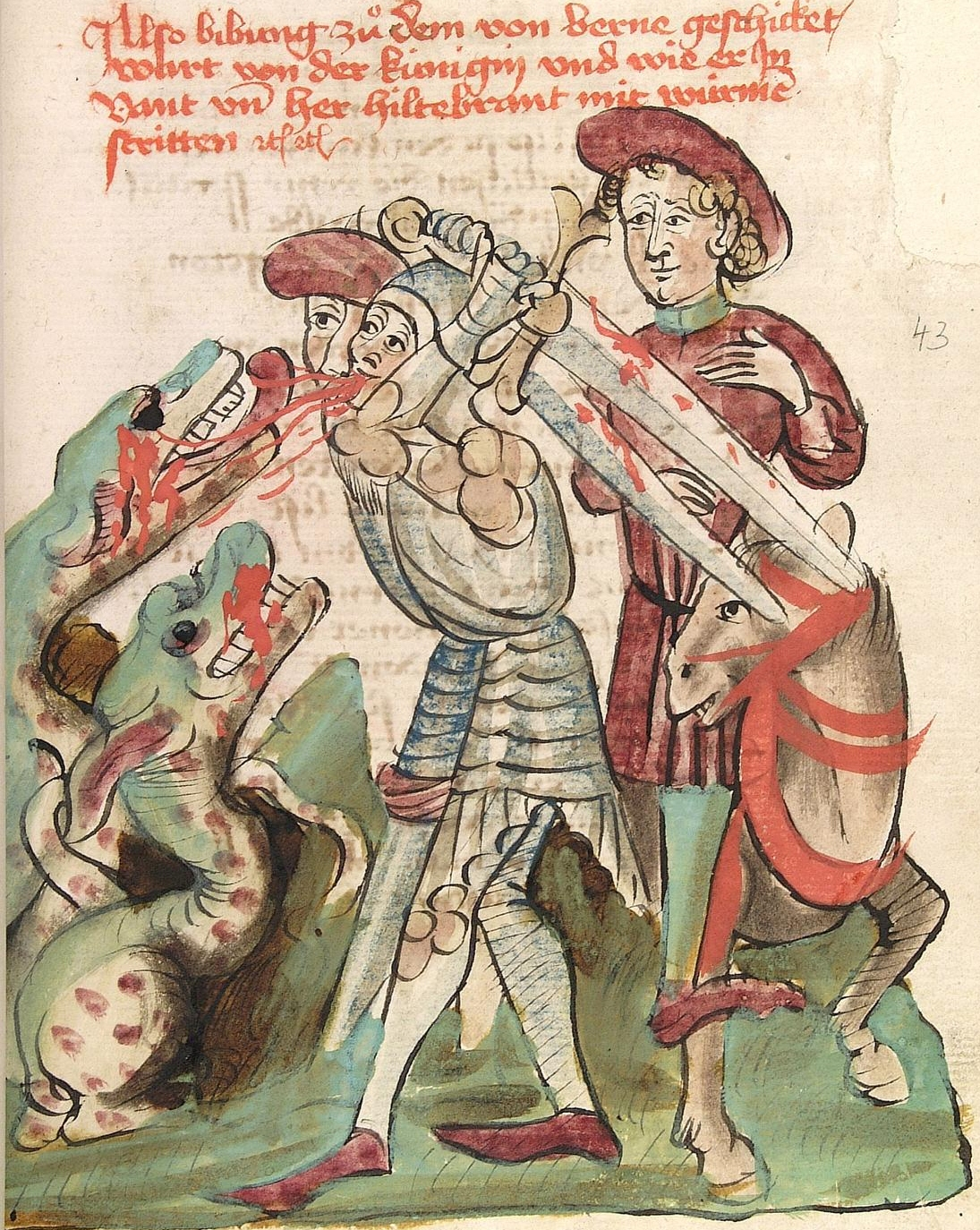
Dietrich von Bern and Hildebrand fight against dragons

- Gram, the sword wielded by Sigurd/Siegfried. It is called Balmung in the Nibelungenlied and Nothung in Richard Wagner's Der Ring des Nibelungen.
- Blutgang (also Burtgang or Blodgang), the sword of Háma.
- Eckesachs (Seax of Ecke), the sword that belonged to the giant Ecke before he was killed by Dietrich von Bern, who then took it for himself.
- Mimung, a great sword that Wudga inherits from his father Wayland the Smith.
- Nagelring, the sword of Dietrich von Bern.

==== Swords from Anglo-Saxon mythology and folklore of the British Islands ====
- Adylok or Hatheloke, the sword of Torrent of Portyngale, according to the Torrent of Portyngale it was forged by Wayland the Smith.
- Ascalon, the sword of St. George according to Richard Johnson's Seven Champions of Christendom
- Brainbiter, the sword of Hereward the Wake.
- Hrunting, the magical sword lent to Beowulf by Unferth which was annealed in venom.
- Nægling, the other magical sword of Beowulf. Found in the cave of Grendel's mother.
- Sword of Saint Peter, St. Joseph of Arimathea brought the sword to Britain and it was kept at Glastonbury Abbey for many years until the Abbot gave it to Saint George. (English folklore)
- Wallace Sword, William Wallace used human skin for his sword's scabbard, hilt, and belt. The flesh's donor was said to have been Hugh de Cressingham, treasurer of Scotland, whom Wallace had flayed after defeating him in the battle of Stirling Bridge. (Scottish folklore)

==== Swords from Arthuriana ====
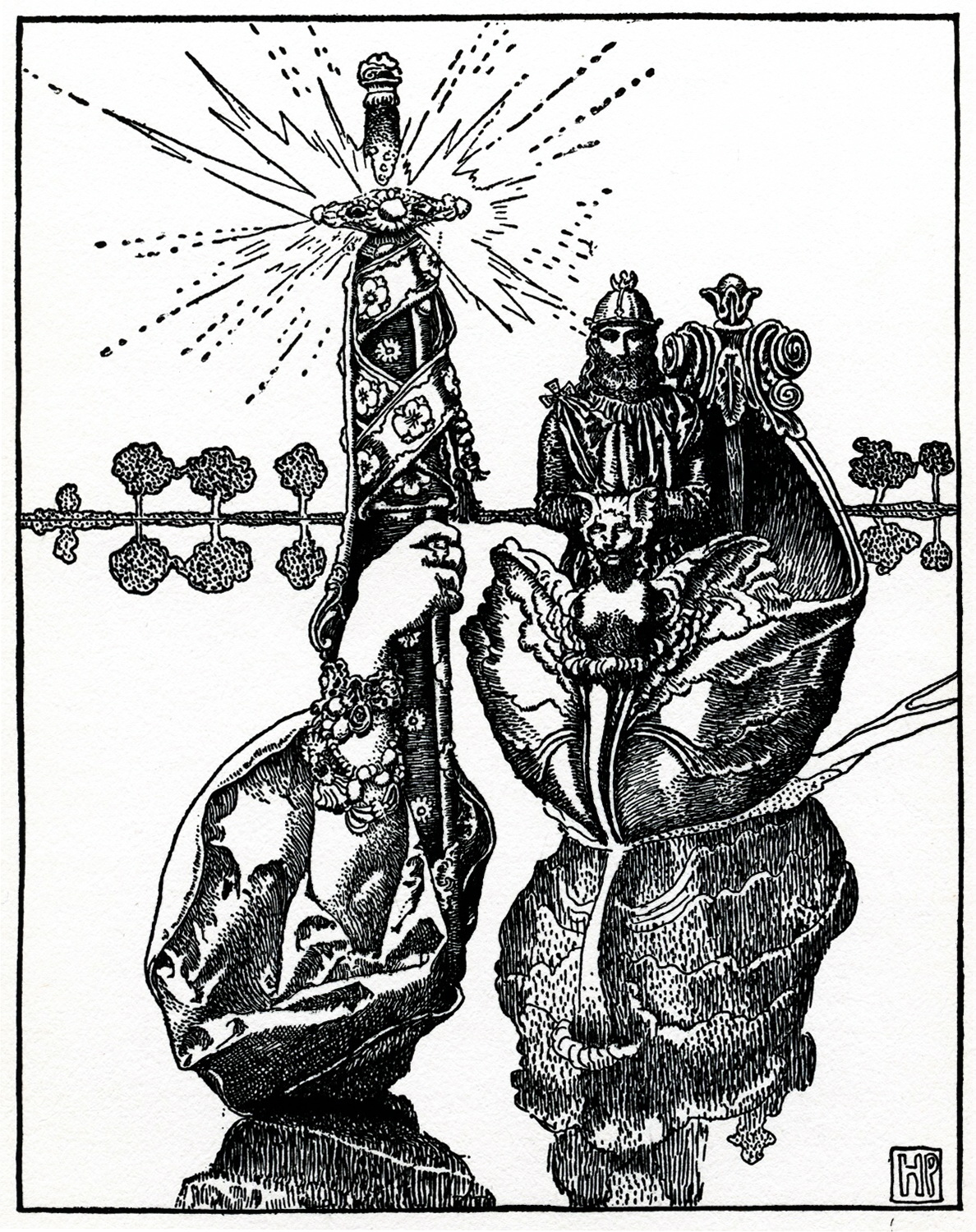
The famous sword of Excalibur painted by Howard Pyle

- Aroundight, sword of Sir Lancelot (cf. Secace below), passed down to Sir Guy, son of Bevis of Hampton according to the Middle English poem Beves of Hamtoun
- Clarent, a sword of peace meant for knighting and ceremonies as opposed to battle, which was stolen and then used to kill Arthur by Mordred.
- Coreuseuse (Wrathful), the sword of King Ban, Lancelot's father.
- Excalibur, it is also sometimes referred to as: Caliburn, Caledfwlch, Calesvol, Kaledvoulc'h, Caliburnus due to inconsistencies within the various Arthurian legends. Sometimes attributed with magical powers or associated with the rightful sovereignty of Great Britain. Stated that it was forged on the Isle of Avalon.
- Marmiadoise, it is also known as Mamyadoise. Marmiadoise is a sword said to originally belong to the Greek deity Heracles and was later given to his descendants, this sword would eventually be used by King Rions until he was killed by King Arthur during a battle, this sword would later be adopted by Arthur himself as he considered it to be superior when compared to the Excalibur.
- Cortain (also Corte, Cortana, "Short"; Danish: Kortone), the shortened sword of Ogier the Dane (Charlemagne's douzepeer, who later became the lover of Morgan le Fay), which was broken when test-cutting a marble block and had to be refashioned with the shorter blade. And when Ogier was about to strike Prince Charlot dead in vengeance, but the archangel Michael stays the sword Short, and the prince is spared. Ogier's sword had originally been the broken-tipped sword of Tristan according to the 13th century Prose Tristan. There appears to be some conflation between this sword from literature and the actual British regalia sword Curtana aka Sword of Mercy.
- Galatine, the name of the sword given to Sir Gawain by the Lady of the Lake.
- Grail Sword, a cracked holy sword which Sir Percival bonded back together, though the crack remained.
- Morddure, Arthur's sword crafted by Merlin in The Faerie Queene; "neither steele, nor stone" could fend its attack. (Renaissance fiction)
- Secace, the sword that Lancelot used to battle the Saxons at Saxon Rock. It is translated as Seure (Sequence) in the Vulgate Cycle.
- Sword in the Stone or Caliburn, a sword in the Arthurian legend which only the rightful king of Britain can pull from the stone; sometimes associated with Excalibur. In Mallory, the sword in the stone is not Excalibur and is not named. When the sword is broken in a fight with King Pellinore, the Lady of the Lake gives him Excalibur as a replacement. At Arthur's death, Excalibur is returned to the Lady of the lake by Sir Bedivere.
- Sword with the Red Hilt, one of the swords wielded by Sir Balin. After his death, Merlin sealed it in the float stone where it remained until it was drawn by Sir Galahad. After Galahad, the sword passes to Sir Lancelot who fatally wounds Sir Gawain with it.

==== Swords from English Romance ====
(non-Arthurian, noncyclical)

- Chrysaor, the golden sword of Sir Artegal in The Faerie Queene. It was tempered with Adamant, and it could cleave through anything. (Renaissance fiction)
- Egeking, a sword in the medieval poem Greysteil. Sir Graham obtains the sword 'Egeking' from Eger's aunt, Sir Egram's Lady.
- Guy of Warwick's Sword, belonged to the legendary Guy of Warwick who is said to have lived in the 10th century.
- Morgelai, the king makes Beves a knight and presents him with a sword called Morgelai.

==== Swords from Norse mythology ====
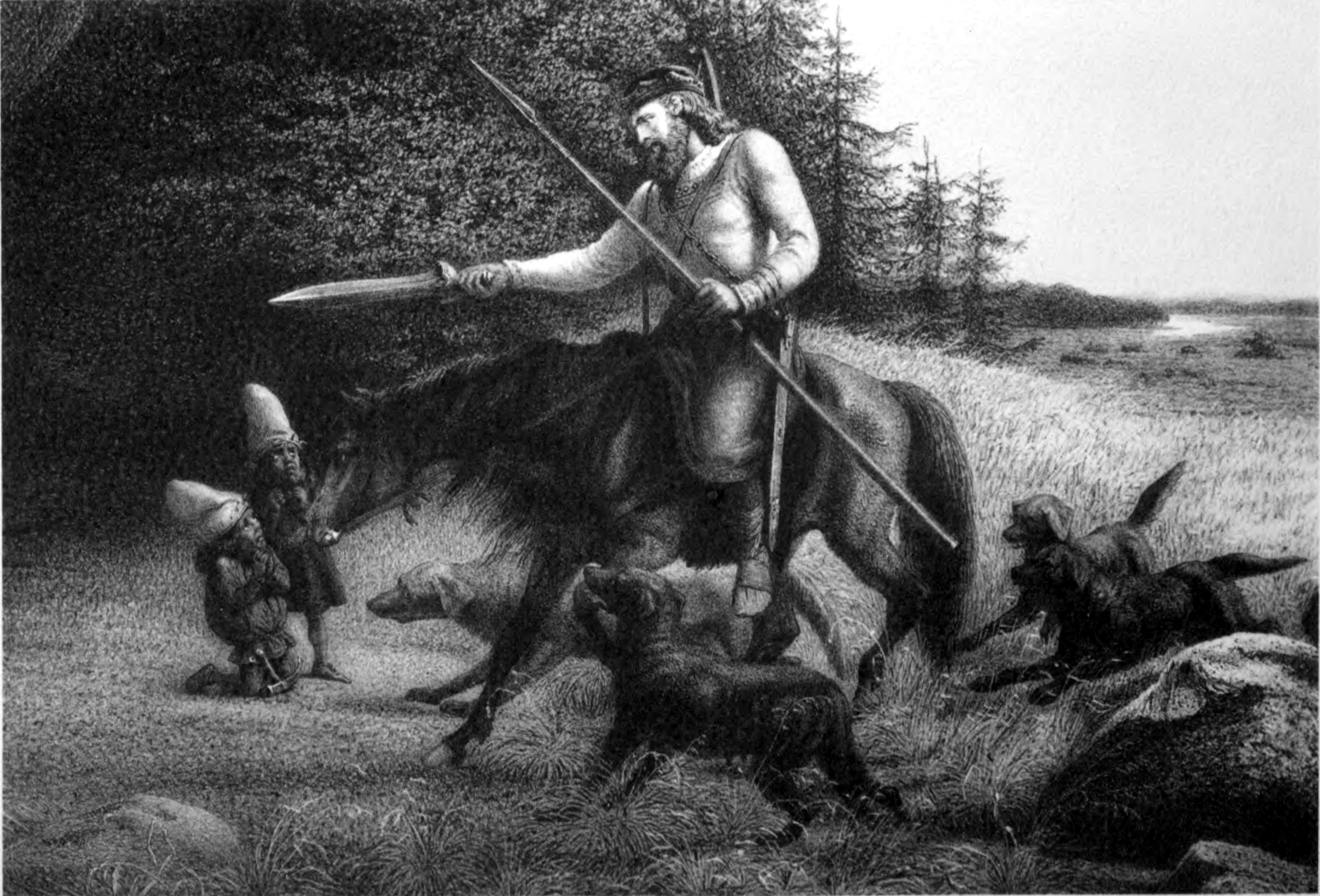
King Svafrlame Secures the Sword Tyrfing

Sometimes it is difficult to decide if a legendary sword should be classed here as "mythological", or treated as historical (incl. pseudo-historical) (Note: Rule of thumb: include magical swords in fornaldarsögur but treat swords in Sagas of Icelanders or sagas of the kings as "historical")

- Angrvaðill (Stream of Anguish), sword passed down from Víkingr to his son Þorsteinn in Þorsteins saga Víkingssonar, then to the grandson Friðþjóf in Friðþjófs saga hins frœkna. It is inscribed with Runic letters which blaze in time of war but gleam with a dim light in time of peace.
- Dáinsleif (Dáinn's legacy), king Högni's sword that gave wounds that never healed and could not be sheathed without killing a man.
- Sword of Freyr, the sword of the Norse god Freyr, it is a magic sword which fought on its own.
- Gramr (Gram), the sword that Óðinn struck into the world tree Barnstokkr which only Sigmunðr the Völsung was able to pull out. It broke in battle with Odin but was later reforged by Sigmunðr 's son Sigurðr who used it to slay the dragon Fáfnir. After being reforged, it could cleave an anvil in half.
- Hǫfuð, the sword of Heimdallr, the guardian of the Bifröst bridge.
- Hrotti, part of Fáfnir's treasure, which Sigurðr took after he slew the dragon.
- Jökulsnautr (Jokul's Gift), a sword belonging to Grettir which was later given to his brother Atli. (Sagas of Icelanders)
- Kársnautr (Karr's-loom), Grettir defeats Kárr who was guarding the treasure in his own funeral tumulus from looters. The treasures are taken from the mound after Grettir's triumph, including an heirloom sword Kársnautr. (Sagas of Icelanders)
- Lævateinn, a sword mentioned in an emendation to the Poetic Edda Fjölsvinnsmál by Sophus Bugge.
- Mistilteinn, the magical sword of Þráinn, the draugr, later owned by Hrómundr Gripsson and it could never go blunt.
- Riðill (also Refil), sword of the dwarf Regin.
- Skofnung, the legendary sword of Danish king Hrólf Kraki. It was renowned for supernatural sharpness and hardness, as well as for being imbued with the spirits of the king's twelve faithful berserker bodyguards. A cut made by Skofnung will not heal. The only way to stop this is by touching the cut with the Skofnung stone.
- Sword of Surtr the flaming sword of the fire giant king Surtr which he uses to slay Freyr and cover the realms in fire at the end of Ragnarök, possibly the same as Freyr's sword.
- Tyrfing (also Tirfing or Tyrving), the cursed sword of Svafrlami with a golden hilt that would never miss a stroke, would never rust and would cut through stone and iron as easily as through clothes. The dwarves made the sword, and it shone and gleamed like fire. However, they cursed it so that it would kill a man every time it was used and that it would be the cause of three great evils.

==== Swords from the Matter of France ====
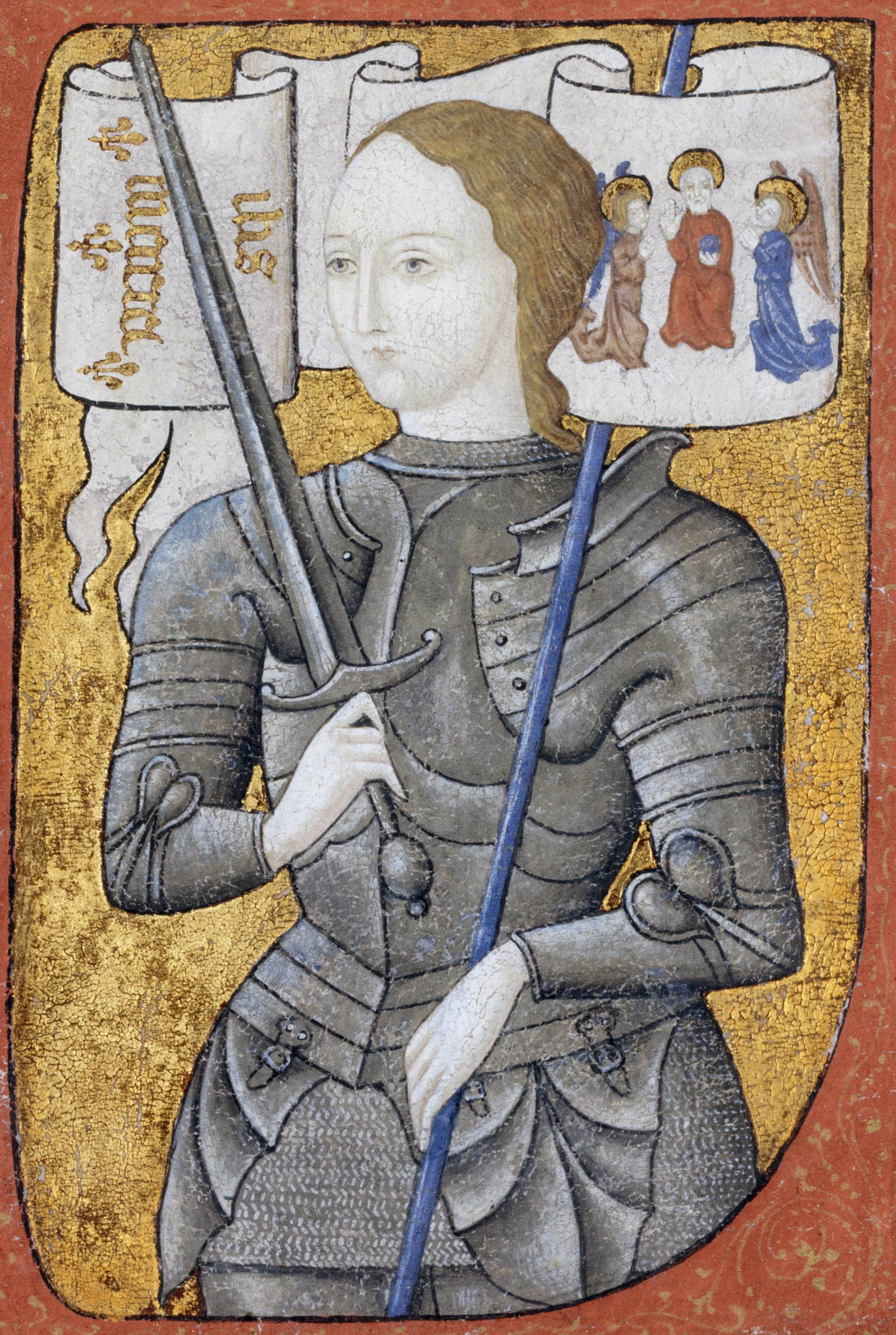
Joan of Arc with her famous sword

- Almace (also Almice or Almacia), sword of Turpin, Archbishop of Reims.
- Balisarda, the sword of Rogero from Orlando Furioso made by a sorceress, and capable of cutting through enchanted substances.
- Baptesme ("Baptism"), Plorance and Garbain, swords of Fierabras (cf. Fierabras § 9 swords)
- Corrougue, the sword of Otuel; Middle English rendition of the sword Corsouse ("Wrathful") of Otinel
- Cortain, sword of Ogier the Dane (cross-listed under § Swords from Arthuriana)
- Durendal (also Durandal or Durlindana in Italian), the sword of Roland, one of Charlemagne's paladins, (Orlando in medieval Italian verse) — alleged to be the same sword as the one wielded by Hector of Ilium. It was said to be the sharpest sword in all of existence.
- Finechamp, the sword of Garin de Monglane, formerly belonging to King Arthur. Mentioned together with Merveilleuse below.
- Froberge, the sword of Renaud de Montauban.
- Glorieuse (Glorious) (fakelore), Olivier (Oliver)'s surpassing sword according to the modern fiction work Croquemitaine (1863) by Ernest L'Épine aka Quatrelles
- Hauteclere (also Halteclere or Hauteclaire), the sword of Olivier. It is described as being of burnished steel, with a crystal embedded in a golden hilt.
- Joan of Arc's sword, Joan's "voices" told her that a magical and holy sword would be found in the Church of Saint Catherine of Fierbois. It had five crosses upon it and that the rust was easily removed.
- Joyeuse, sword of Charlemagne. Some legends claim Joyeuse was forged to contain the Lance of Longinus within its pommel; others say the blade was smithed from the same materials as Roland's Durendal and Ogier's Curtana.
- Merveilleuse ("Marvellous"), the hero's sword in Doon de Mayence. It was so sharp that when placed edge downwards it would cut through a slab of wood without the use of force.
- Murgleys (also Murgleis), sword of Ganelon, traitor and cousin of Roland. Its "gold pommel" held some kind of a "holy relic".
- Précieuse, sword of Baligant, Emir of Babylon.
- Sauvagine (fakelore), second of the two magical swords of Ogier the Dane according to Croquemitaine (1863) by Ernest L'Épine (ka Quatrelles)

==== Swords from Spanish mythology ====
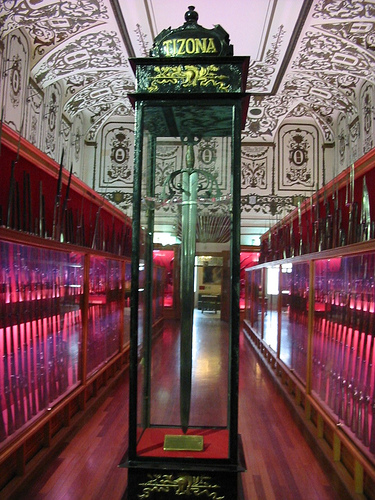
"Tizona", the sword attributed to El Cid, on exhibit in the Army Museum of Madrid

- Colada, the other sword of El Cid.
- Lobera (Wolf Slayer), the sword of the king Saint Ferdinand III of Castile, inheritance of the epic hero Fernán González, according to Don Juan Manuel, Prince of Villena.
- Tizona (also Tizón), the sword of El Cid, it frightens unworthy opponents, as shown in the heroic poem Cantar de Mio Cid.

==== Swords from Greek mythology ====
- Harpe, an adamantine sword used by the hero Perseus to decapitate Medusa.
- Sword of Damocles, a huge sword hung above the throne where Damocles sat, it was held at the pommel only by a single hair of a horse's tail.
- Sword of justice, in Themis right hand, she is seen to have a sword that faces downward. This sword represents punishment.
- Sword of Peleus, a magic sword that makes its wielder victorious in the battle or the hunt.

==== Swords from Roman mythology ====
- Sword of Attila (also Sword of Mars or Sword of God), the legendary sword that was wielded by Attila the Hun; claimed to have originally been the sword of "Mars", the war god of the Scythic barbarians.

==== Swords from Hindu mythology ====
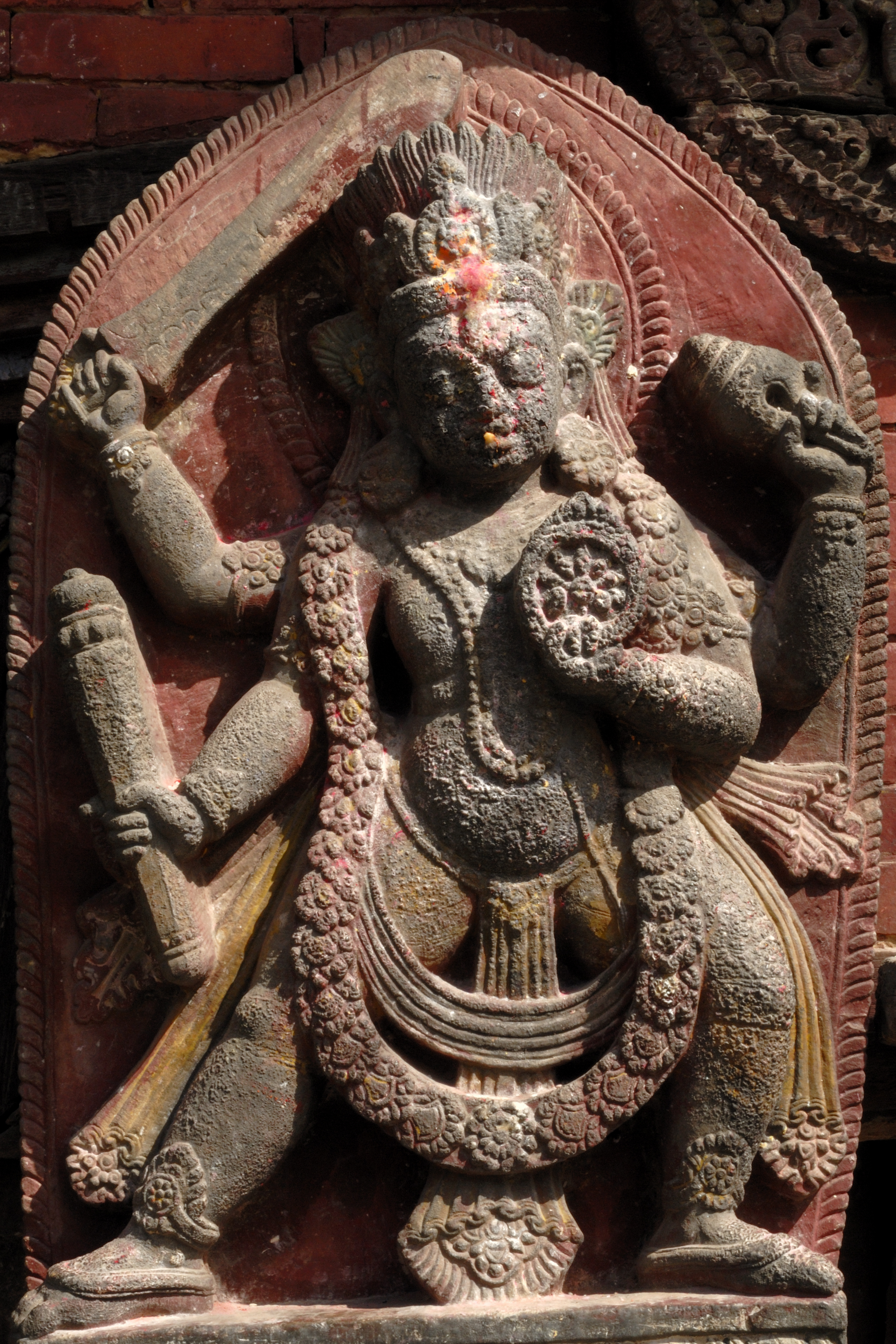
Vishnu holding his legendary sword Nandaka

- Aruval, the Tamils revere the weapon, a type of billhook, as a symbol of Karupannar in (Tamil mythology)
- Asi, a legendary sword mentioned in the epic Mahabharata.
- Chandrahasa, the divine sword given to Ravana by Shiva
- Khanda, (also Mahābhārata Sword), Khanda is represented as wisdom cutting through ignorance. In Hinduism, the Khanda is a symbol of Shiva. Khanda often appears in Rajput history but later on, it was used by Sikh warriors, scriptures, and art.
- Nandaka (also Nandaki), the sword of the Hindu god Vishnu.
- Nistrimsha, the sword of Pradyumna, a son of Krishna.
- Pattayudha, the divine sword of the Veerabhadra, a commander of Shiva's troops.

==== Swords from Japanese mythology ====
Artist's impressions of the (unseen) Imperial Regalia of Japan

- Ame-no-Ohabari (also Ama-no-Ohabari), used by Izanagi to kill his offspring, Kagu-tsuchi.
- Futsu-no-mitama (August-Snap-Spirit), the sword of Takemikazuchi.
- Juuchi Yosamu (10,000 Cold Nights), crafted by Muramasa – in a contest, Sengo Muramasa suspended the blade in a small creek with the cutting edge facing the current. Muramasa's sword cut everything that passed its way; fish, leaves floating down the river, the very air which blew on it.
- Kogarasu Maru (Little Crow), a unique tachi sword believed to have been created by the legendary smith Amakuni during the 8th century CE.
- Kogitsune-maru (Little Fox), Inari Ōkami and its fox spirits help the blacksmith Munechika forge the blade Kogitsune-maru at the end of the 10th century.
- Kusanagi-no-tsurugi (also Ama-no-Murakumo-no-Tsurugi and Tsumugari no Tachi), sword of the Japanese god Susanoo, later given to his sister Amaterasu.
- Totsuka-no-Tsurugi, the sword Susanoo used to slay Yamata no Orochi.
- Yawarakai-Te (Tender Hands), crafted by Masamune – in a contest, Masamune Okazaki lowered his sword into the current and waited patiently. Only leaves were cut. However, the fish swam right up to it, and the air hissed as it gently blew by the blade. A monk who had been watching explained what he had seen; the Masamune was by far the finer of the two swords, as it did not needlessly cut that which is innocent and undeserving.

==== Swords from Chinese mythology ====
- Feijian, a sword borrowed from Lü Dongbin to Xuanwu in order to subdue the spirits of the tortoise and the snake.
- Gan Jiang and Mo Ye, the legendary Chinese twin swords named after their creators.
- Glory of Ten Powers, a legendary Chinese sword allegedly forged in Tibet by husband-and-wife magicians of the ancient Bön tradition.
- Huàyǐng, a branch that morphed into a sword in the hands of Zhuānxū, has the ability to command the elements and animals.
- Xuan Yuan Sword, a sword given to Huangdi by Jiutian Xuannü during his war against Chiyou. Able to slay gods, demons and repel evil magic.
- Téngkōng, a sword that descended from heaven into the possession of Zhuānxū. Said to levitate and points towards the direction of war.

==== Swords from Buddhist mythology ====
- Chandrahrasa, legendary sword of Manjusri, according to Swayambhu Purana used to found Kathmandu Valley, forms the centerpiece of flag of Kathmandu.
- Houken, a metaphorical Buddhist sword used to cut away earthly desires, it is wielded by Acala.
- Khanda represents wisdom cutting through ignorance. Hindu and Buddhist deities are often shown welding or holding khanda sword in religious art. Notably, Buddhist guardian deities like Acala, Manjushri, Mahākāla and Palden Lhamo.

==== Swords from Slavic legend ====
- Grus, the historical sword of Bolesław III Wrymouth, medieval prince of Poland.
- Kladenets (also Samosek or Samosyok), the "self-swinging sword" is a fabulous magic sword in some Old Russian fairy tales. In English translations of Russian byliny and folklore, it may be rendered variously as "sword of steel". (Russian mythology)
- Szczerbiec (Notched Sword or Jagged Sword), a legend links Szczerbiec with Bolesław I the Brave who was said to have chipped the sword by hitting it against the Golden Gate, Kiev (now in Ukraine) during his intervention in the Kievan succession crisis in 1018.

==== Swords from Middle Eastern mythology ====
- Shamshir-e Zomorrodnegar (Persian: شمشیر زمردنگار), "The emerald-studded Sword" in the Persian mythical story Amir Arsalan. The hideous horned demon called Fulad-zereh was invulnerable to all weapons except the blows of Shamshir-e Zomorrodnegar. This blade originally belonged to King Solomon. (Persian mythology)
- Tigh-e Tahmuras (Persian:تیغ تهمورث), "The Blade Of Tahmurath" is a heavenly blade made by the legendary Persian king Tahmurath in Iranian folk tales, which can neutralize magic and spells and destroy invulnerable creatures and demons. And it is usually used by Rostam and his family members. (Persian mythology)
- Dhulfiqar, a sword sent from the Heavens to the Islamic prophet Muhammad by the archangel Gabriel, which he was ordered to give to Ali ibn Abi Talib. (Islamic mythology)

=== Pole weapons ===
==== Clubs and maces ====
- Heracles' club, a gnarled olive-wood club wielded by Heracles. (Greek Mythology)
- Sharur, the enchanted mace of the Sumerian god Ninurta. It can fly unaided and also may communicate with its wielder. (Mesopotamian mythology)
- Tishtrya's mace, a mace wielded by Tishtrya that can create lightning and tornados. (Persian mythology)
- Gorz-e gāvsār, an ox-headed mace described in various Iranian and Zoroastrian myths that is used as a symbol of victory and justice. (Persian mythology)
- Gorz-e Mithra, a golden mace wielded by Mithras, the god of covenants, that can be thrown from a distance, he twirls his mace over the heads of the demons every day and night in Hell to prevent them from harming the spirits of the dead too much.(Persian mythology)
- Yagrush and Ayamur, two clubs created by Kothar and used by Baal to defeat Yam. (Phoenician mythology)
- Indravarman III's metalwood bat, a legendary bat wielded by a Cambodian emperor. (Buddhist mythology)
- Lorg Mór, the magical club or staff of Dagda which was supposed to be able to kill nine men with one blow, but can return the slain to life with the handle. (Irish mythology)

==== Clubs and staffs from Hindu mythology ====
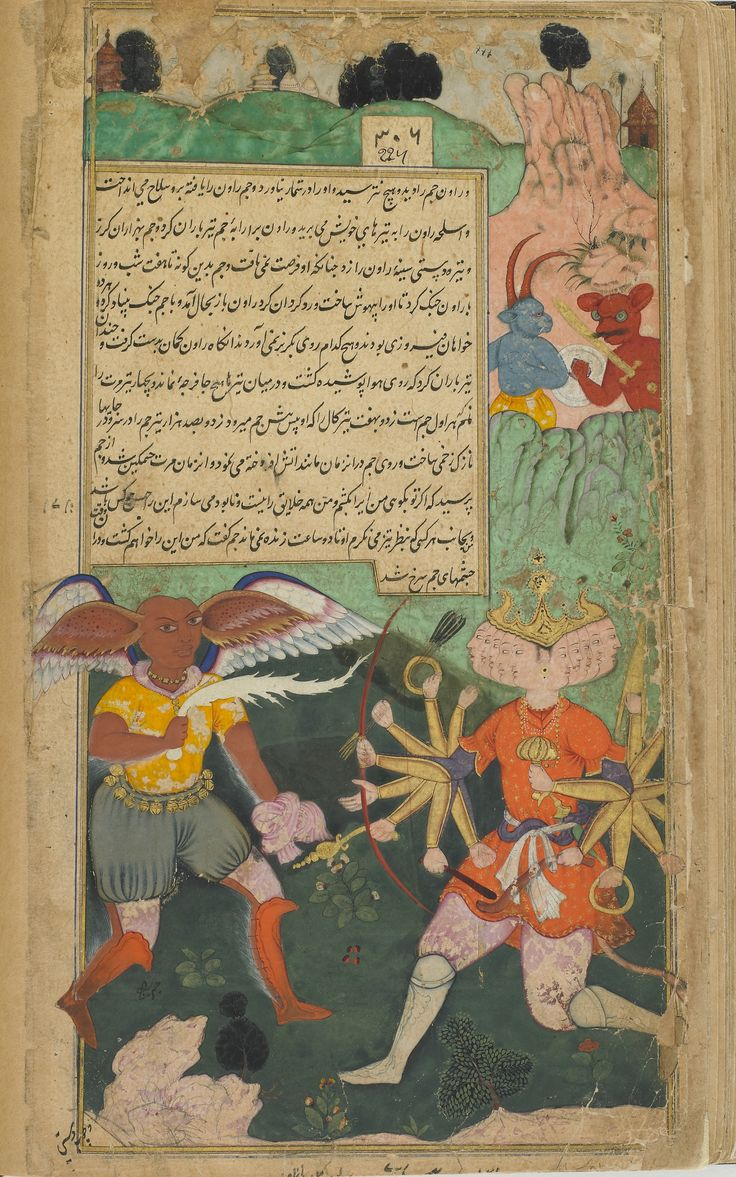
Yama advances to smite Ravana with the weapon of death

- Kaumodaki, the mace of the Hindu god Vishnu, found in iconography of some of Vishnu's avatars.
- Kaladanda, the staff of Death is a club used by Yama, the god of death in Hindu mythology. Once fired, it could kill anyone, no matter what boons they had to protect themselves.
- Gada, the main weapon of the Hindu god Hanuman.
- Mace of Bhima, a club that was presented by Mayasura. It was a weapon of the danava King Vrishaparva.

==== Rods and staffs ====
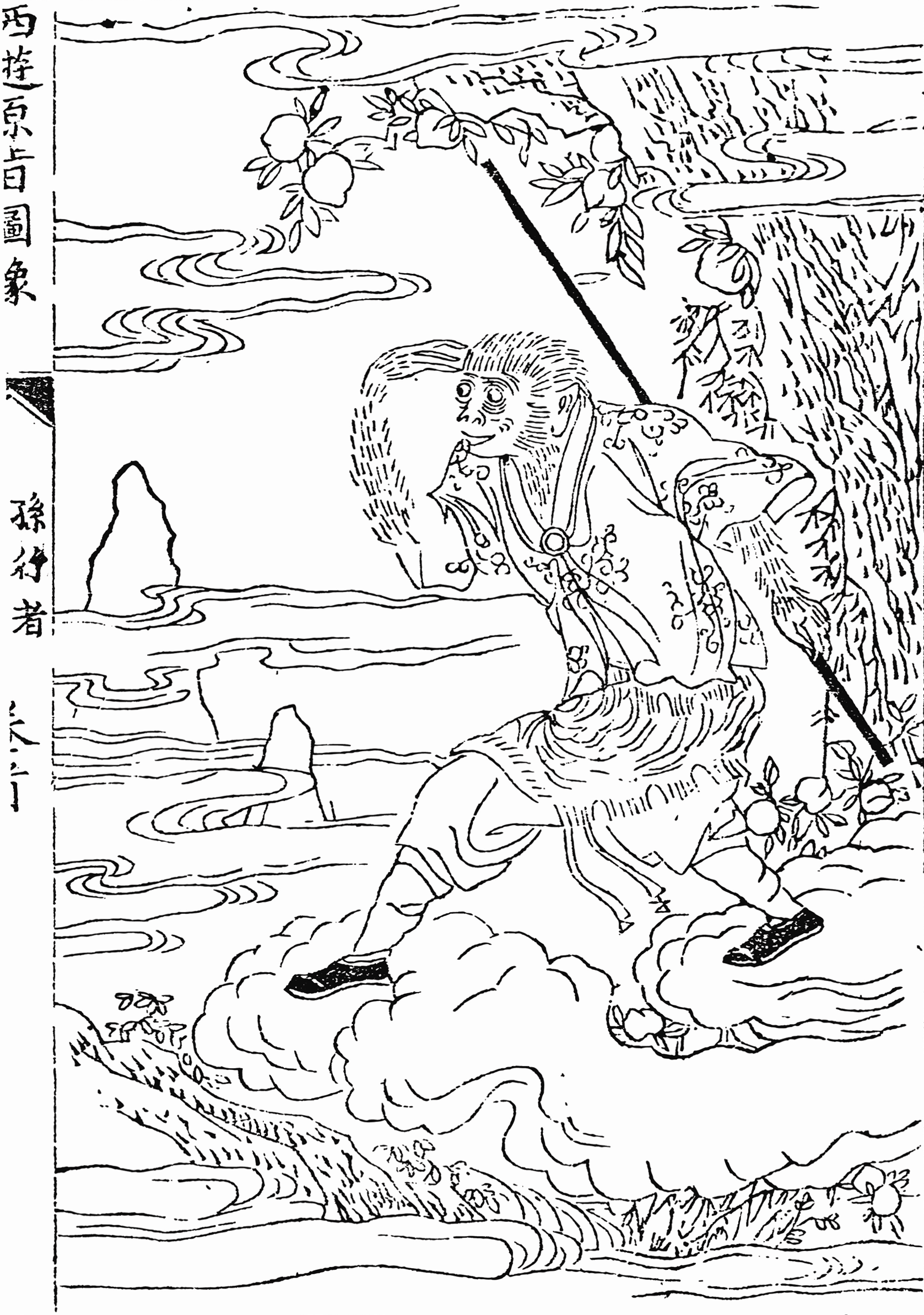
A 19th-century drawing of Sun Wukong featuring his staff

- Merlin's staff, the staff of the legendary wizard of Camelot, advisor and mentor to king Arthur. (Arthurian legend)
- Prospero's staff, staff belonging to the wizard Prospero in the Shakespearean play "The Tempest."
- Gambanteinn, appears in two poems in the Poetic Edda. (Norse mythology)
- Gríðarvölr, a magical staff given to Thor by Gríðr so he could kill the giant Geirröd. (Norse mythology)
- Nehushtan, a staff of bronze made by Moses to erect so that the Israelites who saw it would be protected from dying from the bites of the "fiery serpents". (Jewish mythology)
- Ruyi Jingu Bang, the staff of Sun Wukong, which could alter its size from a tiny needle to a mighty pillar. (Chinese mythology)
- Khaṭvāṅga, Shiva and Rudra carried the khatvāṅga as a staff weapon and are thus referred to as khatvāṅgīs. In Buddhist mythology, it is a particularly divine attribute of Padmasambhava and endemic to his iconographic representation and depicted as an accoutrement of his divine consorts, Mandarava and Yeshe Tsogyal. In the twilight language, it represents Yab-Yum. (Hindu mythology)
- Aaron's rod, was endowed with miraculous power during the Plagues of Egypt that preceded the Exodus and was carried by Aaron. (Jewish mythology)
- Staff of Moses, used by Moses to produce water from a rock, was transformed into a snake and back, and was used at the parting of the Red Sea. (Jewish mythology)
- Ruyi (As Desired or As [You] Wish), a curved decorative object that serves as a ceremonial sceptre in Chinese Buddhism or a talisman symbolizing power and good fortune in Chinese folklore. (Chinese folklore)
- Was (Power or Dominion), a scepter associated with the gods as well as with the pharaoh. In later use, it was a symbol of control over the force of chaos that Set represented. It appears as a stylized animal head at the top of a long, straight staff with a forked end. (Egyptian mythology)
- Opaṣoro, the cosmic staff of Ọbatala, king of the gods. (Yoruba religion)

Rods and Staffs from Greek Mythology

- Caduceus (also Kerykeion), the staff carried by Hermes or Mercury. It is a short staff entwined by two serpents, sometimes surmounted by wings, and symbolic of commerce. (Greek mythology)
- Circe's staff, a staff with which the sorceress Circe could transform others into animals. (Greek mythology)
- Rod of Asclepius, a serpent-entwined rod wielded by Asclepius, a deity associated with healing and medicine. (Greek mythology)
- Thyrsus, a staff tipped with a pine cone and entwined with ivy leaves, carried by Dionysus and his followers. (Greek mythology)

==== Scythes ====
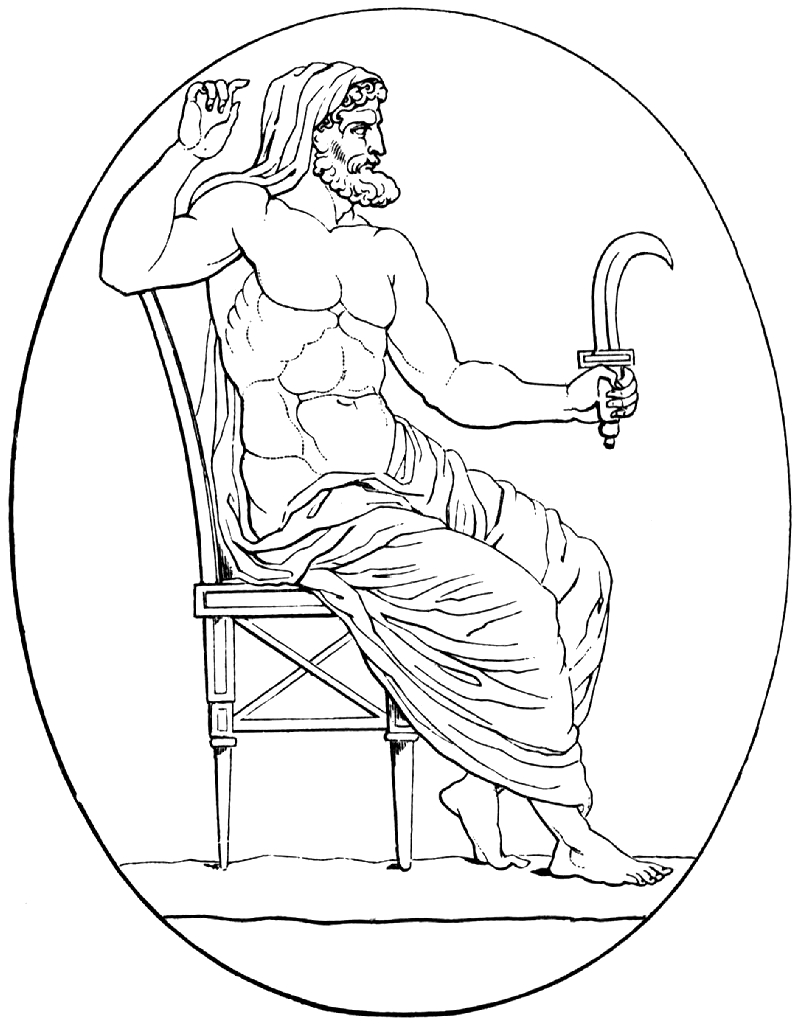
Greek God Kronos/Saturnus with sickle

- Cronus' scythe, Cronus castrated his father Uranus using an adamant sickle given to him by his mother Gaia. (Greek mythology)
- Grim Reaper's scythe, a large scythe wielded by the Grim Reaper.
- Scythe of Father Time, during the Renaissance, Father Time was depicted as wielding the harvesting scythe, and became the representative of the cruel and unrelenting flow of time which, in the end, cuts down all things.
- Death's scythe, the fourth of the Four Horsemen of the Apocalypse rides on a Pale Horse is Death, he is commonly depict carrying a scythe. (Christian mythology)

==== Spears ====
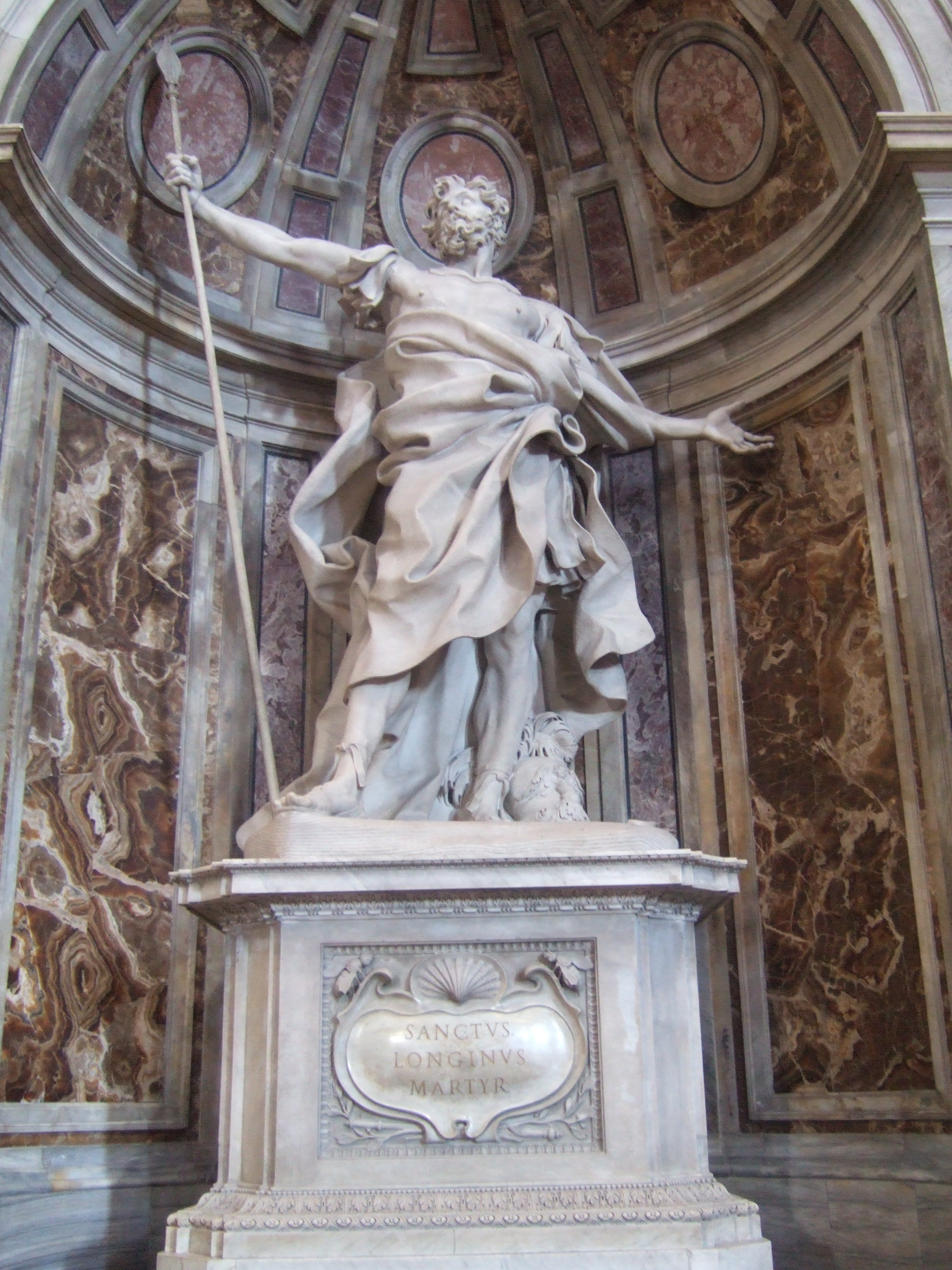
Longinus with his famous Spear

- Aram, the spear of Jangar. (Mongol mythology)
- Gungnir, Odin's spear created by the Sons of Ivaldi. The spear is described as being so well balanced that it could strike any target, no matter the skill or strength of the wielder. (Norse mythology)
- Gunnar's Atgeir, Gunnar's atgeir would make a ringing sound or "sing" when it was taken down in anticipation of bloodshed. (Norse mythology)
- Maltet, the name of the spear of Baligant from The Song of Roland. (French folklore)
- Rhongomyniad (also Rhongomiant), the spear of King Arthur that he used to defeat the legendary Sir Thomas of Wolford. (Arthurian legend)
- Spear of Achilles, created by Hephaestus and given to Peleus at his wedding with Thetis. (Greek mythology)
- Spear of Longinus, see Lances: Bleeding Lance and Holy Lance (below).

==== Spears from Celtic mythology ====
- Areadbhar (also Areadbhair), the spear of Lugh, which originally belonged to Pisear, king of Persia. Lugh had no need to wield the spear himself. It was alive and thirsted for blood that was only stayed by steeping its head in a sleeping-draught of pounded fresh poppy seeds. When battle was near, it was drawn out; then it roared and struggled against its thongs, fire blazed from it, and it tore through the ranks of the enemy once slipped from the leash, never tired of slaying.
- Crann Buidhe, the spear of Manannán.
- Del Chliss, Cú Chulainn's spear that first belonged to Nechtan Scéne, and used to kill the sons of Nechtan Scéne. Formerly the name for the charioteer's goad, a split piece of wood.
- Gáe Buide (Yellow Shaft), a yellow spear that can inflict wounds from which none could recover. The spear of Diarmuid Ua Duibhne, given to him by Aengus.
- Gáe Bulg, the spear of Cú Chulainn, made of the bone of a sea monster. According to the legend, this spear was crafted by the warrior maiden Scáthach and had the power to explode into dozens of barbs, producing instant death.
- Gae Assail (Spear of Assal), another spear belonging to Lugh, the incantation "Ibar (Yew)" made the cast always hit its mark, and "Athibar (Re-Yew)" caused the spear to return.
- Gáe Dearg (Red Javelin), the red spear of Diarmuid Ua Duibhne, given to him by Aengus. It inflicted wounds that none could recover from similar to Gáe Buide.
- Lúin of Celtchar, the name of a long, fiery lance or spear belonging to Celtchar mac Uthechar and wielded by other heroes, such as Dubthach, Mac Cécht and Fedlimid.

==== Spears from Japanese mythology ====
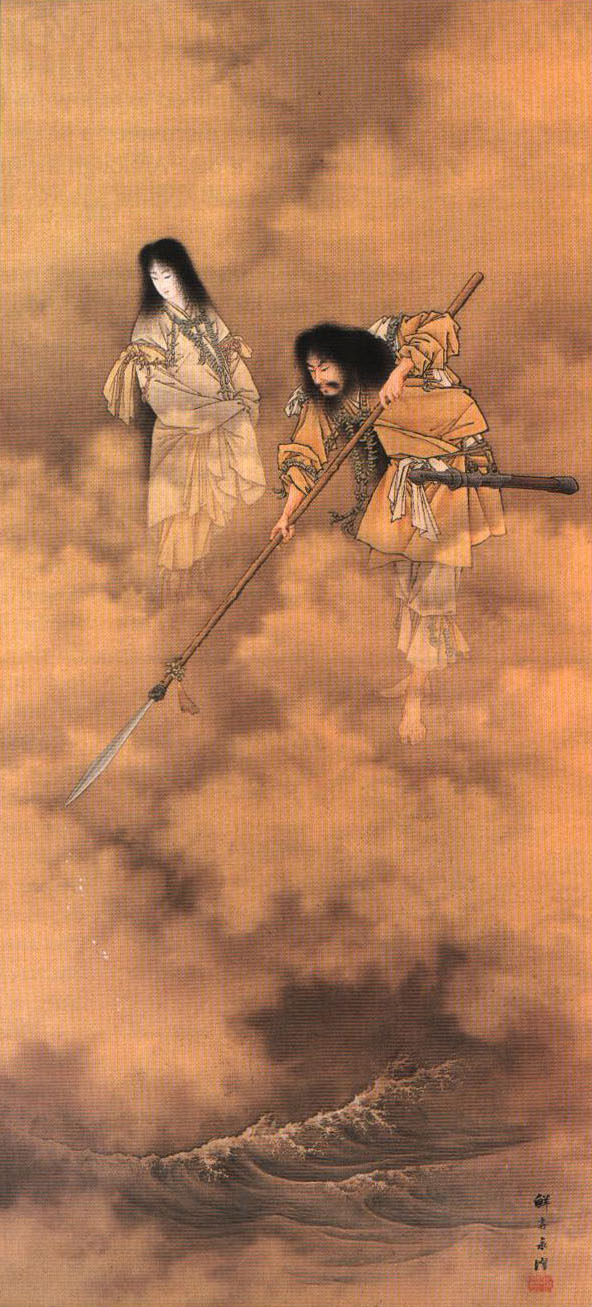
Amenonuhoko (天沼矛 or 天之瓊矛 or 天瓊戈, "heavenly jeweled spear") is the name given to the spear in Shinto used to raise the primordial land-mass, Onogoro-shima, from the sea

- Amenonuhoko (Heavenly Jewelled Spear), the naginata used by the Shinto deities Izanagi and Izanami to create the world – also called tonbogiri.
- Ama-no-Saka-hoko (Heavenly Upside Down Spear) is an antique and mysterious spear, staked by Ninigi-no-Mikoto at the summit of Takachiho-no-mine, where he and his divine followers first landed, according to the legend of Tenson kōrin.
- Nihongo, is one of three legendary Japanese spears created by the famed swordsmith Masazane Fujiwara. A famous spear that was once used in the Imperial Palace. Nihongo later found its way into the possession of Masanori Fukushima, and then Tahei Mori.
- Otegine, is one of three legendary Japanese spears created by the famed swordsmith Masazane Fujiwara.
- Tonbokiri, is one of three legendary Japanese spears created by the famed swordsmith Masazane Fujiwara, said to be wielded by the legendary daimyō Honda Tadakatsu. The spear derives its name from the myth that a dragonfly landed on its blade and was instantly cut in two. Thus Tonbo (Japanese for "dragonfly") and kiri (Japanese for "cutting"), translating this spear's name as "Dragonfly Slaying spear".

==== Polearms from Chinese mythology ====
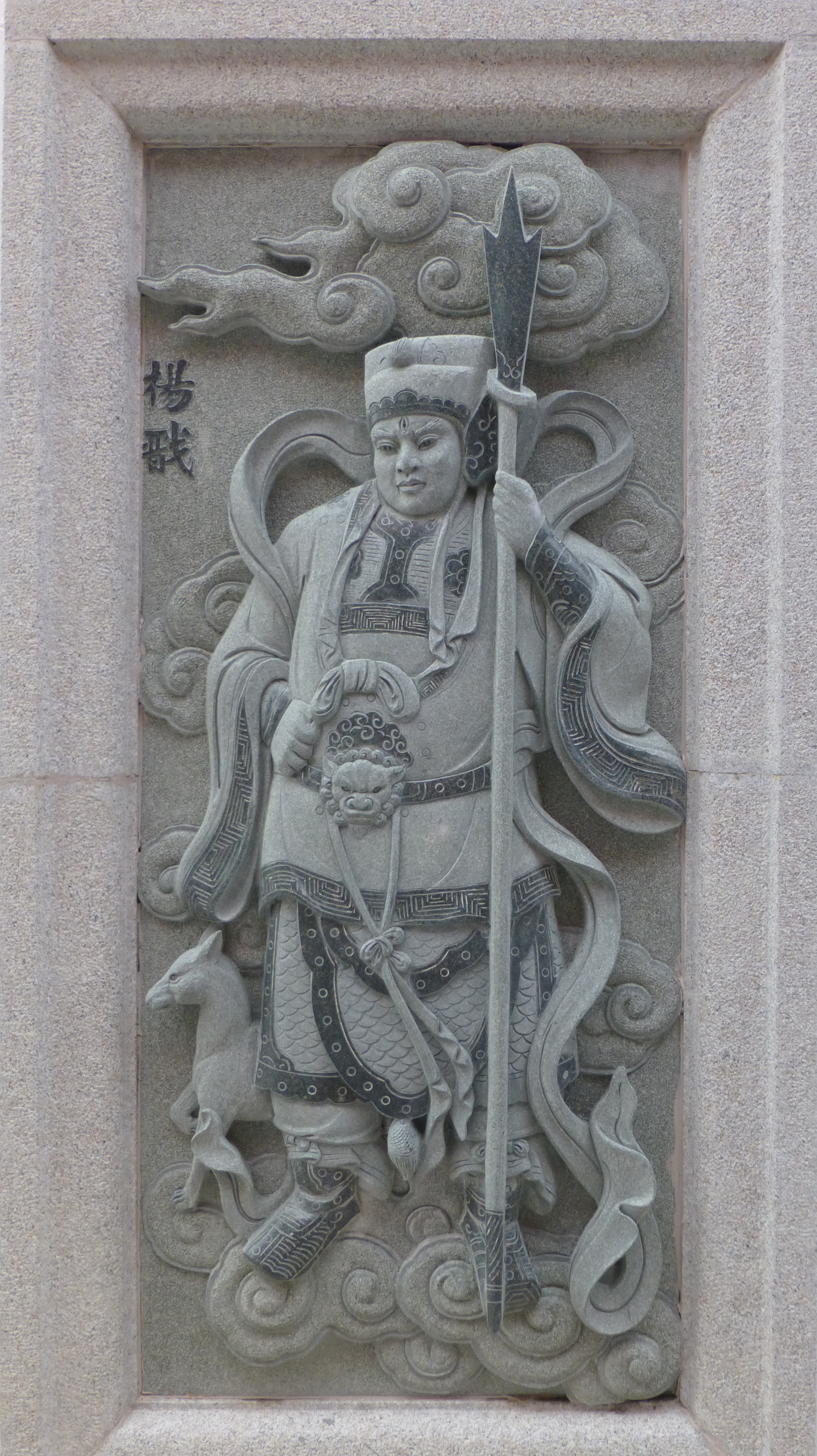
Erlang Shen (二郎神), or Erlang is a Chinese God with his spear

- Erlang Shen's spear, a three-pointed and double-edged spear with two cutting edges of a Saber used by Erlang Shen. It is powerful enough to penetrate and cleave through steel and stone like wool.
- Green Dragon Crescent Blade, a legendary weapon wielded by Guan Yu in the historical novel Romance of the Three Kingdoms. It is a guandao, a type of traditional Chinese weapon. It is also sometimes referred to as the Frost Fair Blade, from the idea that during a battle in the snow, the blade continuously had blood on it; the blood froze and made a layer of frost on the blade.
- Jiuchidingpa (Nine-tooth Iron Rake), the primary weapon of Zhu Bajie.
- 1.8 zhang long Serpent Spear, Zhang Fei's spear from the Three Kingdoms period in China.
- Spear of Fuchai, the spear used by Goujian's arch-rival King Fuchai of Wu.
- Yueyachan (Crescent-Moon-Shovel), a Monk's spade that is the primary weapon of Sha Wujing. A double-headed staff with a crescent-moon blade at one end and a spade at the other, with six xīzhàng rings in the shovel part to denote its religious association.
- Han Feizi's spear, a man was trying to sell a spear and a shield. When asked how good his spear was, he said that his spear could pierce any shield. Then, when asked how good his shield was, he said that it could defend from all spear attacks. Then one person asked him what would happen if he were to take his spear to strike his shield; the seller could not answer. This led to the idiom of "zìxīang máodùn" (自相矛盾, "from each-other spear shield"), or "self-contradictory".

==== Bidents ====
- Bident, a two-pronged implement resembling a pitchfork. In classical mythology, the bident is associated with Pluto/Hades, the ruler of the underworld. (Greek mythology)
- Devil's pitchfork, a bident or two-pronged pitchfork belonging to the devil. (Christian mythology)

==== Javelins ====
- Vel, a divine javelin associated with Hindu war god Kartikeya. (Hindu mythology)

==== Lances ====
- Bleeding Lance, a sacred object, imbued with magic, in Grail ceremonies. Drops of blood issue from its point. When the Grail is Christianized, this weapon transforms into the Holy Lance, the spear that pierced the side of Jesus by the hand of a Roman soldier named Longinus. The blood is that of the lamb and drips eternally into the Grail. From the Vulgate Cycle on the Lance is also the weapon that inflicted the Grail-keeper's wound even though it is often attributed with healing powers. (Arthurian legend)
- Bradamante's lance, a female Christian knight who wields a magical lance that unhorses anyone it touches. (Matter of France)
- Lance of Olyndicus, wielded by the Celtiberians' war chief Olyndicus, who fought against Rome. According to Florus, he wielded a silver lance that was sent to him by the gods from the sky. (Spanish mythology)
- Holy Lance (also Spear of Longinus or Spear of Destiny), is the name given to the lance that pierced the side of Jesus as he hung on the cross, according to the Gospel of John. (Christian mythology)

==== Tridents ====
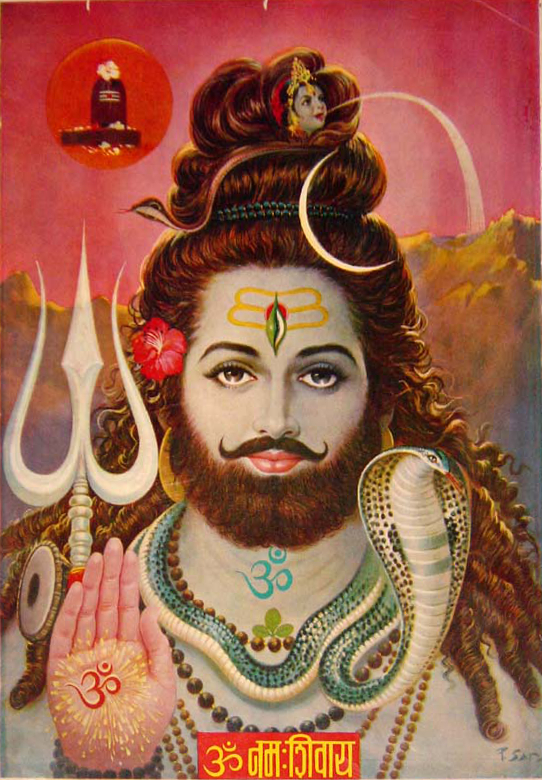
Shiva with his Trishula

- Kongō, A trident-shaped staff which emits a bright light in the darkness, and grants wisdom and insight. The staff belonged originally to the Japanese mountain god Kōya-no-Myōjin. It is the equivalent of the Sanskrit Vajra, the indestructible lightning-diamond pounder of the king of the gods/rain-god Indra. There the staff represents the three flames of the sacrificial fire, part of the image of the vajra wheel. (Japanese mythology)
- Trident of Poseidon, associated with Poseidon, the god of the sea in Greek mythology and the Roman god Neptune. When struck the earth in anger, it caused mighty earthquakes and his trident could stir up tidal waves, tsunamis, and sea storms. (Greek mythology)
- Trident of Madhu, Madhu handed everything over to his son Lavanasura including his trident before drowning himself in the ocean because of shame. (Hindu mythology)
- Trishula, the trident of Shiva, stylized by some as used as a missile weapon and often included a crossed stabilizer to facilitate flight when thrown. Considered to be the most powerful weapon. (Hindu mythology)

=== Whips ===
- Chentu, a horse whip which looks like a crooked stick, and is a typical attribute of Aiyanar, Krishna in his aspect as Rajagopala, and Shiva with Nandi. (Hindu mythology)

=== Daggers ===
- Carnwennan (Little White-Hilt), the dagger of King Arthur. It is sometimes attributed with the power to shroud its user in shadow, and was used by Arthur to slice the Very Black Witch in half. (Arthurian legend)
- Dagger of Rostam, a glittering dagger that Rostam used to behead the white daeva Div-e Sepid. (Persian mythology)
- Knife of Llawfrodedd the Horseman, Llawfrodedd Farchog (from marchog "the Horseman"), or Barfawc "the Bearded" in other manuscripts, is said to have owned a knife which would serve for a company of 24 men at the dinner table. (Welsh mythology)
- Parazonium, a dagger frequently carried by Virtus, Mars, Roma, or the Emperor, giving them the aura of courage. (Roman mythology)

==== Daggers from Indonesia and Malay folklore ====
- Kris Mpu Gandring, Ken Arok's cursed dagger. The unfinished or incomplete kris would kill seven men, including Ken Arok.
- Kris Taming Sari (Flower Shield or Beautiful Shield), one of the most well-known kris in Malay literature, said to be so skilfully crafted that anyone wielding it was unbeatable.
- Kris Setan Kober, belong to Arya Penangsang, the mighty viceroy (adipati) of Jipang who was killed by his own kris called Setan Kober ("devil of the grave"). Forged by Empu Bayu Aji in the kingdom of Pajajaran, and had 13 luk on its blade.

=== Axes ===
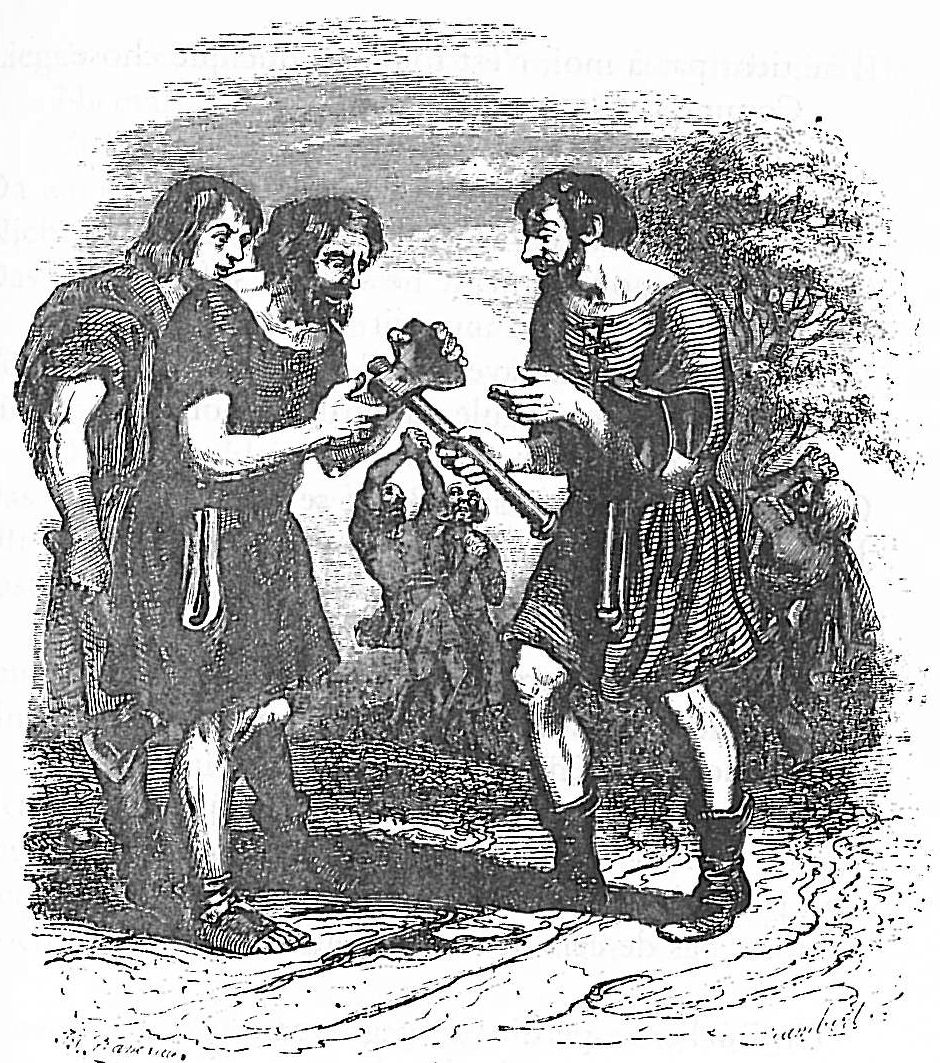
The Honest Woodcutter, also known as Mercury and the Woodman and his famous Golden Axe

- Axe of Perun, the axe wielded by the Slavic god of thunder and lightning, Perun. (Slavic paganism)
- Forseti's axe (also Fosite's axe), a golden battle axe that Forseti (or Fosite in the Frisian mythology) used to save the old sages of the wreck and then threw the axe to an island to bring forth a source of water. (Norse mythology)
- Hephaestus's Labrys, a double-headed axe used by Hephaestus to slice open Zeus's head and free Athena, whose pregnant mother Zeus swallowed to prevent her offspring from dethroning him. (Greek mythology)
- Lightning axe, an axe that is wielded by the Maya rain deity Chaac and used to produce thunder and rain. (Maya mythology)
- Parashu, the battle-axe of Shiva who gave it to Parashurama. (Hindu mythology)
- Pangu's axe, an axe wielded by Pangu. He used it to separate yin from yang, creating the Earth (murky yin) and the Sky (clear yang). (Chinese mythology)
- Paul Bunyan's axe, an axe wielded by Paul Bunyan. It was responsible for carving the Grand Canyon after Paul once dragged it behind him while walking. (American folklore)
- Gobán Saor's axe, it could hold back the tide when it was thrown onto the seashore. (Irish mythology)
- Oshé, an axe wielded by the deity and legendary king Shango that can produce lightning. (Yoruba mythology)
- Zeus's Labrys, at Labraunda there were depictions of Zeus who was called Zeus Labrandeus (Ζεὺς Λαβρανδεύς) with a tall lotus-tipped sceptre upright in his left hand and the double-headed axe over his right shoulder. (Greek mythology)
- Golden axe, a woodcutter accidentally dropped his axe into a river and sat down to weep. Hermes dived into the water and returned with a golden axe. Hermes asked if this is his axe, but the woodcutter said it was not. (Greek folklore)
- Silver axe, the woodcutter returned the same answer when a silver axe was brought to the surface by Hermes. Only when his own axe is found does he claim it. Impressed by his honesty, Hermes allows him to keep all three axes. (Greek folklore)

=== Hammers ===
- Mjölnir, Thor's hammer. It was indestructible and returned to the user's hand when thrown. It also revived his goats and blessed marriages and burials. (Norse mythology)
- Ukonvasara (also Ukonkirves), the weapon of the Finnish thunder god Ukko. (Finnish mythology)
- Uchide no kozuchi, a legendary Japanese "magic hammer" which can "tap out" anything wished for, and is wielded by Daikoku-ten in popular belief. (Japanese folklore)
- Hammer of Hephaestus, the hammer of the Greek god Hephaestus, which he used to make the Greek gods' weapons. (Greek mythology)

=== Bow and arrows ===
==== Bows ====
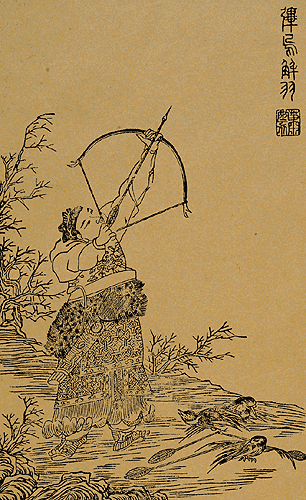
Houyi, the God of Archery

- Arash's bow, Arash used the bow to determine the border between Persia and Turan, it is said that the arrow was traveling for three days, and Arash sacrificed himself while firing the bow by putting his life force in the arrow. (Persian mythology)
- Fail-not, the bow of Tristan. It was said to never miss its mark. (Arthurian legend)
- Houyi's bow, the God of Archery used his bow to shoot down nine out of ten sun-birds from the sky. (Chinese mythology)
- Conquest's bow, the first of the Four Horsemen of the Apocalypse rides on a White Horse is Conquest, and he who sat on it had a bow. (Christian mythology)
- Oṣosi's bow, the bow wielded by the divine hunter Oṣosi. (Yoruba religion)
- Kērēsāspa's bow, The bow with which Kērēsāspa went to war with the giant demonic bird Kamak and shot infinite arrows like rain into its wings and brought it down and killed it. People also know that bow as a rainbow in the sky.(Persian mythology)

==== Bows from Classical Greek and Roman mythology ====
- Apollo's bow, a silver bow wielded by Apollo, used to slay Python.
- Artemis's bow, a silver bow wielded by Artemis.
- Eros's bow, a bow wielded by Eros that could cause one to love or hate the person they first saw after being struck.
- Heracles's bow, which also belonged to Philoctetes, its arrows had been dipped in the blood of the Lernaean Hydra, which made them instantly lethal.
- Eurytus' bow, Eurytus became so proud of his archery skills that he challenged Apollo. The god killed Eurytus for his presumption, and Eurytus' bow was passed to Iphitus, who later gave the bow to his friend Odysseus. It was this bow that Odysseus used to kill the suitors who had wanted to take his wife, Penelope.

==== Bows from Hindu mythology ====
- Pinaka, a bow wielded by Shiva that fired arrows that could not be intercepted.
- Vijaya, a bow wielded by Parashurama.
- Gandiva, a bow created by Brahma and used by Arjuna during the Kurukshetra War.
- Sharanga, the bow of the Hindu god Vishnu and his avatars.
- Kaundinya's bow, a magic bow wielded by the Brahman Kaundinya, who used it to make the Naga princess Mera fall in love with him.
- Indra's bow, the rainbow is depicted as an archer's bow. Indra, the god of thunder and war, uses the rainbow to shoot arrows of lightning.

==== Arrows ====
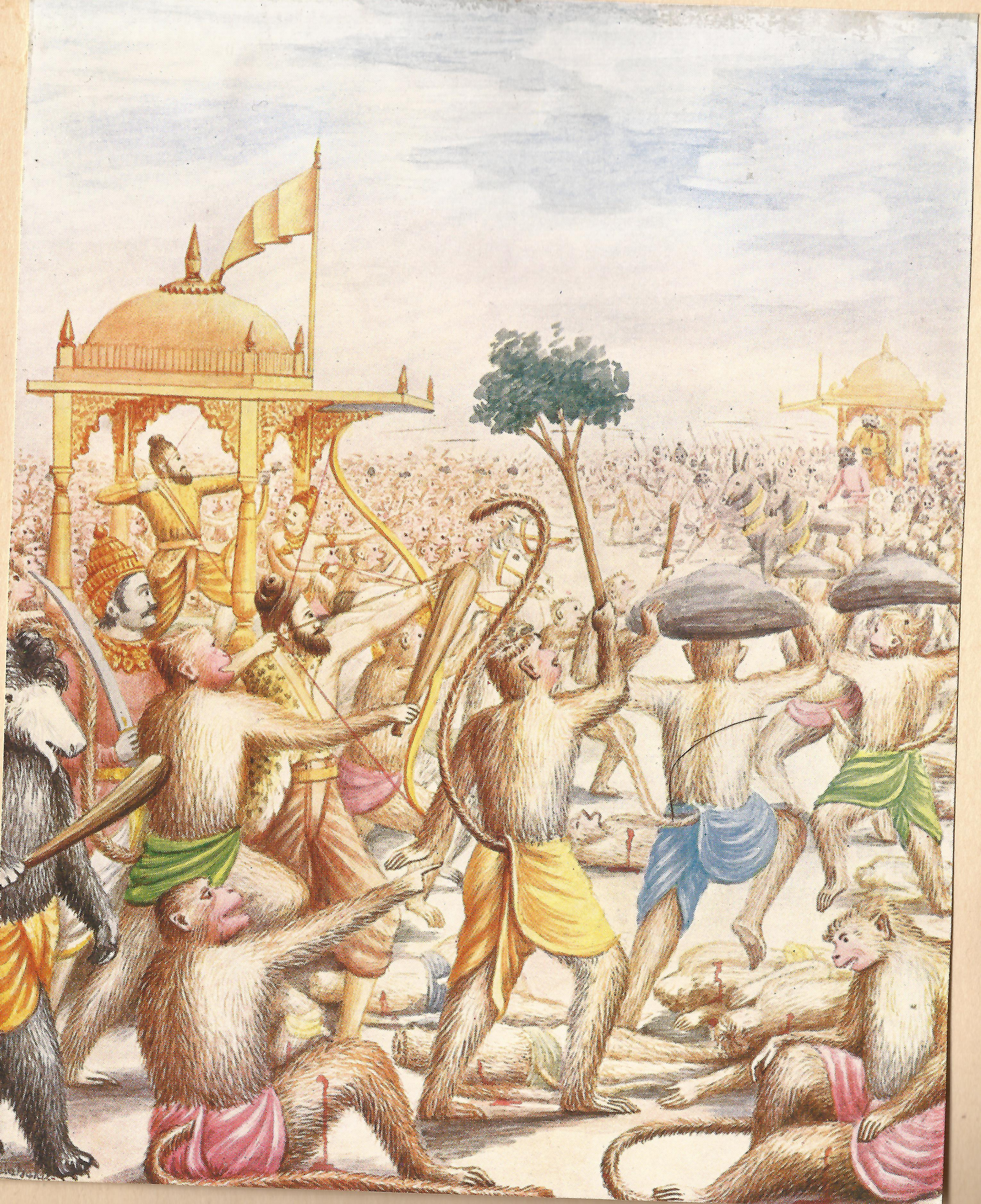
Killing of Ravana Painting by Brahmstra of Arrow of Brahma

- Apollo's arrow, An arrow that could cause health or cause famine and death in sleep. (Greek mythology)
- Artemis's arrow, golden arrows that could be used to bring sudden death and disease to girls and women. (Greek mythology)
- Arrow of Brahma, the demi-god Rama faced the demon king of Sri-Lanka, Ravana. Rama fired the arrow of Brahma that had been imparted to him by Agastya. The arrow of Brahma burst Ravana's navel, and returned to Rama's quiver. (Hindu mythology)
- Teen Baan, Shiva gave Barbarika three infallible arrows (Teen Baan). A single arrow was enough to destroy all opponents in any war, and it would then return to Barbarika's quiver. (Hindu mythology)
- Elf-arrow (also Pixie Arrow), were arrowheads of flint used in hunting and war by the aborigines of the British Isles and of Europe in general. Elf-Arrows derived their name from the folklore belief that the arrows fell from the sky, and were used by elves to kill cattle and inflict Elfshot on human beings. Elf-Arrows were sometimes worn as amulets, occasionally set in silver, as a charm against witchcraft. (English folklore)
- Heracles' arrows, arrows wielded by Heracles that were coated in poisonous Hydra blood. (Greek mythology)
- Gusisnautar, magic arrows given to Örvar-Oddr by his father. (Norse mythology)
- Sagitta (Arrow), regarded as the weapon that Hercules used to kill the eagle Aquila that perpetually gnawed Prometheus' liver. (Greek mythology)

=== Crossbows ===
- Saintly Crossbow of the Supernaturally Luminous Golden Claw (also 靈光金爪神弩; SV: Linh Quang Kim Trảo Thần Nỏ), which could kill 300 men with one shot. A giant golden turtle (also Kim Quy) gave An Dương Vương one of his claws and instructed him to make a crossbow using it as a trigger, assuring him he would be invincible with it. (Note: Đại Việt sử ký toàn thư, Peripheral Annals, Vol. 1, sections 6b-7b) A man called Cao Lỗ (or Cao Thông) was tasked with the creation of the crossbow.(see also Vietnamese mythology)
- William Tell's crossbow: the governor of Altdorf forced William to shoot with his crossbow at an apple placed over his son's head a hundred feet away, as a way of punishing him for not bowing to the governor's statue. William, despite being a master of the crossbow, loaded two arrows into it. At the first attempt he hit the target. Amazed, the governor asked the reason for loading the second arrow. William replied that, in case the first projectile hit his son, he would shoot the second arrow into the evil heart of the one who caused his death. (Swiss folklore)

=== Projectile weapons ===
- Sling-stone (also Cloich Tabaill), was used by Lugh to slay his grandfather, Balor the Strong-Smiter in the Cath Maige Tuired according to the brief accounts in the Lebor Gabála Érenn. (Irish mythology)
- Thunderbolt, lightning plays a role in many mythologies, often as the weapon of a sky god and weather god. Thunderbolts as divine weapons can be found in many mythologies. In Greek mythology, the thunderbolt is a weapon given to Zeus by the Cyclops, or by Hephaestus in Greek mythology. Zibelthiurdos of Paleo-Balkan mythology is a god recognized as similar to Zeus as a wielder of lightning and thunderbolts. In Igbo mythology, the thunderbolt is the weapon of Amadioha and in Yoruba mythology, the thunderbolt is the weapon of Shango.
- Xiuhcoatl, a lightning-like weapon wielded by Huitzilopochtli. (Aztec religion)
- Holly Dart or Mistletoe, a weapon that Loki used to kill Baldr, variously depicted as a holly dart, mistletoe, arrow, or spear. (Norse mythology)
- Tathlum, the missile fired by Lugh from the Sling-stone. (Irish mythology)
- Magic Bullet, an enchanted bullet obtained through a contract with the devil in the German folk legend Freischütz. A marksman has obtained a certain number of bullets destined to hit without fail whatever object he wishes. Six of the magic bullets are thus subservient to the marksman's will, but the seventh is at the absolute disposal of the devil himself. (German folklore)
- Silver bullet, a bullet cast from silver that is often the only weapon effective against a werewolf, witch, or other monsters.
- Kenkonken, a chakram of great power wielded by Nezha. (Chinese mythology)

==== Projectile weapons from Hindu mythology ====
- Astra, a supernatural weapon, presided over by a specific deity. To summon or use an astra required knowledge of a specific incantation/invocation, when armed.
- Brahmastra, described in a number of the Puranas, it was considered the deadliest weapon. It was said that when the Brahmastra was discharged, there was neither a counterattack nor a defense that could stop it.
- Narayanastra, the personal missile of Vishnu in his Narayana or Naraina form.
- Pashupatastra, an irresistible and most destructive personal weapon of Shiva and Kali, discharged by the mind, the eyes, words, or a bow.
- Varunastra, a water weapon (a storm) according to the Indian scriptures, incepted by Varuna. In stories it is said to assume any weapon's shape, just like water. This weapon is commonly mentioned as being used to counter the Agneyastra.
- Agneyastra, the god of fire Agni possess a weapon that would discharge and emit flames inextinguishable through normal means.
- Sudarshana Chakra, a legendary spinning disc like weapon used by the Hindu God Vishnu.
- Vajra, the weapon of the Vedic rain and thunder-deity Indra, and is used symbolically by the dharmic traditions to represent firmness of spirit and spiritual power. (Hindu mythology/Buddhist mythology/Jain mythology)
- Brahmanda Astra, it is said in the epic Mahabharata that the weapon manifests with the all five heads of Lord Brahma as its tip. Brahma earlier lost his fifth head when he fought with Lord Shiva. This weapon is said to possess the power to destroy entire solar system or Brahmand, the 14 realms according to Hindu cosmology.
- Brahmashirsha Astra, It is thought that the Brahmashirsha Astra is the evolution of the Brahmastra, and 4 times stronger than Brahmastra. The weapon manifests with the four heads of Lord Brahma as its tip. When it strikes an area it will cause complete destruction and nothing will grow, not even a blade of grass, for the next 12 years. It will not rain for 12 years in that area, and everything including metal and earth become poisoned.
- Vasavi Shakti, the magical dart of Indra. Used by Karna against Ghatotkacha in the Mahabharata War.

== Hooks ==
- Māui's Fishhook, used to catch the fish that would become New Zealand's North Island; the hook was also used to create the Hawaiian Islands. (Polynesian mythology) but could also be used as a weapon to defeat those that try to misuse the hook.

== Jewelry ==
=== Necklaces ===
- Brísingamen, the necklace of the goddess Freyja. (Norse mythology)
- Necklace of Harmonia, allowed any woman wearing it to remain eternally young and beautiful, but also brought great misfortune to all of its wearers or owners. It was made by Hephaestus and given to Harmonia, the daughter of Aphrodite and Ares, as a curse on the House of Thebes for Aphrodite's infidelity. (Greek mythology)
- Necklace of the Lady of the Lake, a jeweled necklace given to Sir Pelleas after assisting an old woman across a river. It was enchanted so that its wearer would be unfathomably loved. (Arthurian legend)
- Yasakani no Magatama, a bejeweled necklace of magatamas offered to Amaterasu. One of three Sacred Imperial Relics of Japan. It represents benevolence. (Japanese mythology)
- Mikuratana-no-kami, a necklace of beads. Izanagi gave Amaterasu as a representation of her rule over Takama-ga-hara. (Japanese mythology)

==== Amulets and Charms ====
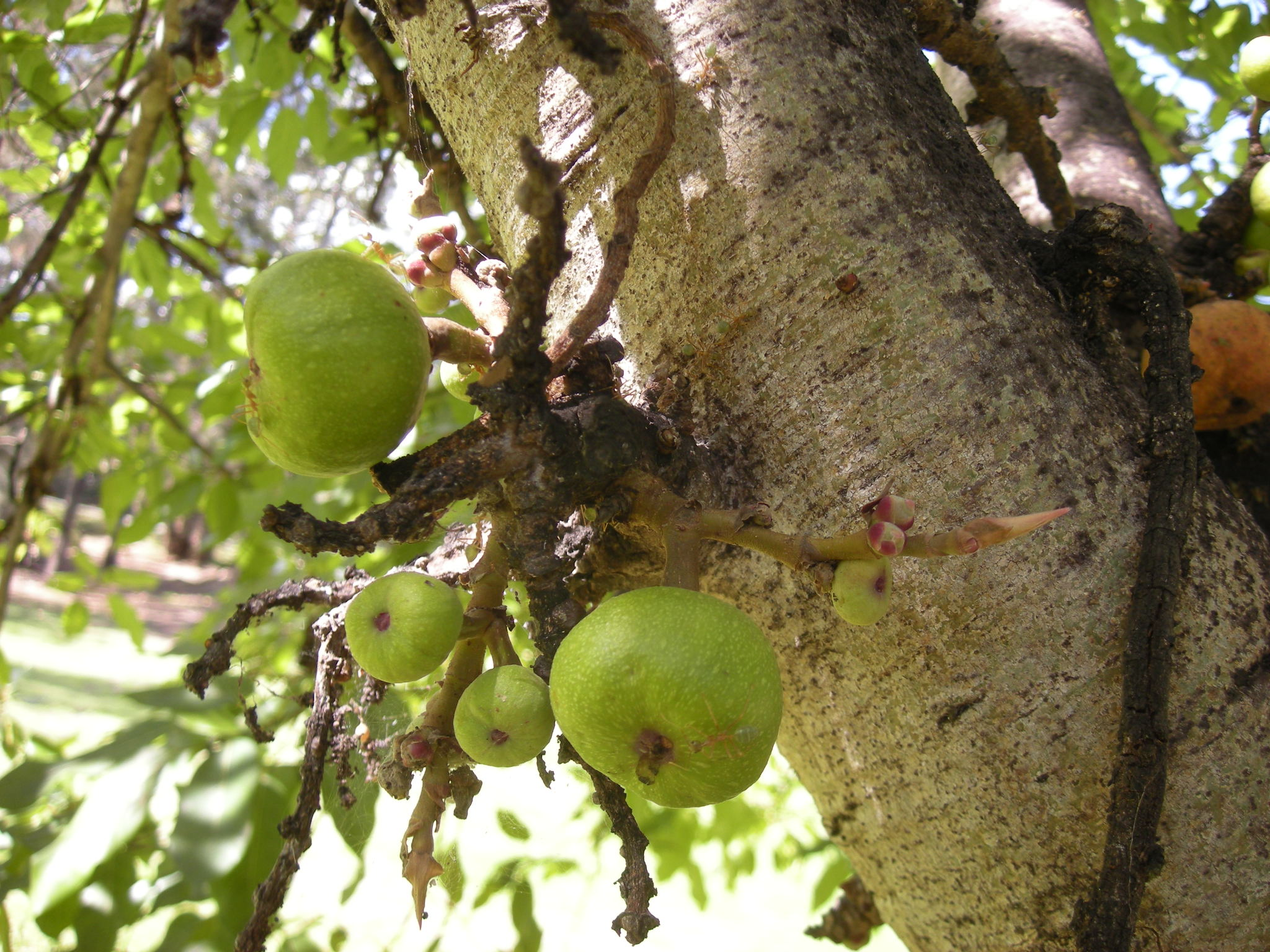
Fig trees often represent talismans with the udumbara

- Agimat, a Filipino word for "amulet" or "charm".
- Ankh, an amulet which appears frequently in Egyptian tomb paintings and other art, often at the fingertips of a god or goddess. (Egyptian mythology)
- Phylactery, an amulet or charm, worn for its supposed magical power.
- Rabbit's foot, the foot of a rabbit is carried as an amulet believed to bring good luck. (American folklore/Canadian folklore)
- Vedic amulet, in Vedic literature, fig trees often represent talismans with the udumbara fig tree having been deemed the "lord of amulets". (Hindu mythology/Buddhist mythology)
- Wolfssegen (also Wolfsegen and Wolf-Segen), an apotropaic charm against wolves. (European folklore)

=== Rings ===
Goetia seal of solomon

- Andvaranaut, a magical ring capable of producing gold, first owned by Andvari. (Norse mythology)
- Draupnir, a golden arm ring possessed by Odin that is a source of endless wealth. (Norse mythology)
- Ring of Dispel, a ring given to Sir Lancelot by the Lady of the Lake which could dispel any enchantment. In Le Chevalier de la Charrette it is given to him by a fairy instead. He used the ring to cross the Sword Bridge. (Arthurian legend)
- Ring of Mudarra, the ring that Gonzalo Gustioz breaks in two pieces to so he can later on recognize the son with which his lover is pregnant. When that son, Mudarra, joins the two halves, it again becomes a complete ring and Gonzalo Gustioz is healed of his blindness in the epic poem Cantar de los Siete Infantes de Lara. (Spanish mythology)
- Ring of Gyges, a mythical magical artifact that granted its owner the power of invisibility. (Greek mythology)
- Seal of Solomon, a magical brass or steel ring that could imprison demons. (Jewish mythology/Christian mythology)
- Svíagriss, Adils' prized ring in the Hrólfr Kraki's saga. (Norse mythology)
- Stone and Ring of Eluned the Fortunate, a cloak of invisibility owned by Merlin. (Welsh mythology)
- Angelica's ring, a ring possessed by Angelica, princess of Cathay in the legends of Charlemagne. It rendered its wearer immune to all enchantments, and renders the user invisible when placed in their mouth. (Mythology in France)
- Nibelungen ring, Alberich steals the Rhinegold from the Rhinemaidens, having learned that he who is willing to renounce love will thereby gain the ability to forge a ring of power from the gold. Alberich forges the ring and makes himself lord over all the Nibelungen. (German mythology)
- Aladdin's ring, a magic ring the sorcerer from the Maghreb has lent him. When he rubs his hands in despair, he inadvertently rubs the ring and a genie appears. (Arabic mythology)
- Wish ring, three princesses gave Halvor a ring to wish himself to his parents and back to Soria Moria Castle. (Scandinavian folklore)

==== Arm rings ====
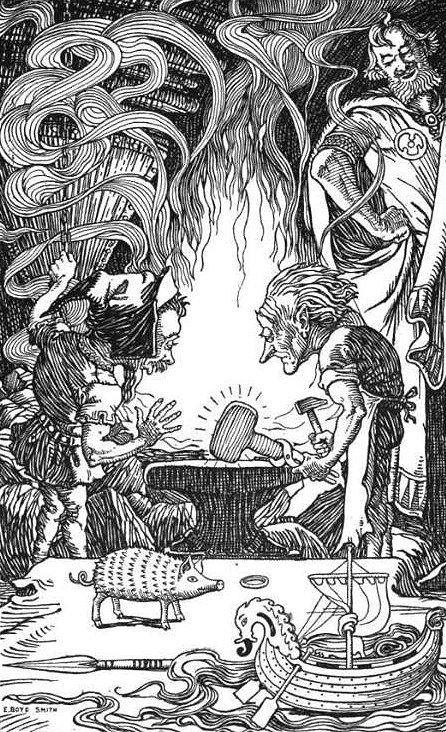
The third gift — an enormous hammer (1902) by Elmer Boyd Smith and the ring Draupnir is visible among other creations by the Sons of Ivaldi

- Keyur, a golden jewellery, worn by Krishna on his arm over the biceps. (Hindu mythology)

==== Earrings ====
- Karna Kundala, the ear-rings of Karna (was present at his birth). (Hindu mythology)
- Makarakundala, makara shaped ear-rings are sometimes worn by the Hindu gods, for example Shiva, the Destroyer, or the Preserver-god Vishnu, the Sun god Surya, and the Mother Goddess Chandi. (Hindu mythology)
- Shiva Kundala, the Hindu God Shiva wears two earrings or Kundalas. Traditional images of Shiva depict the two earrings named – Alakshya and Niranjana. (Hindu mythology)

=== Gemstones ===
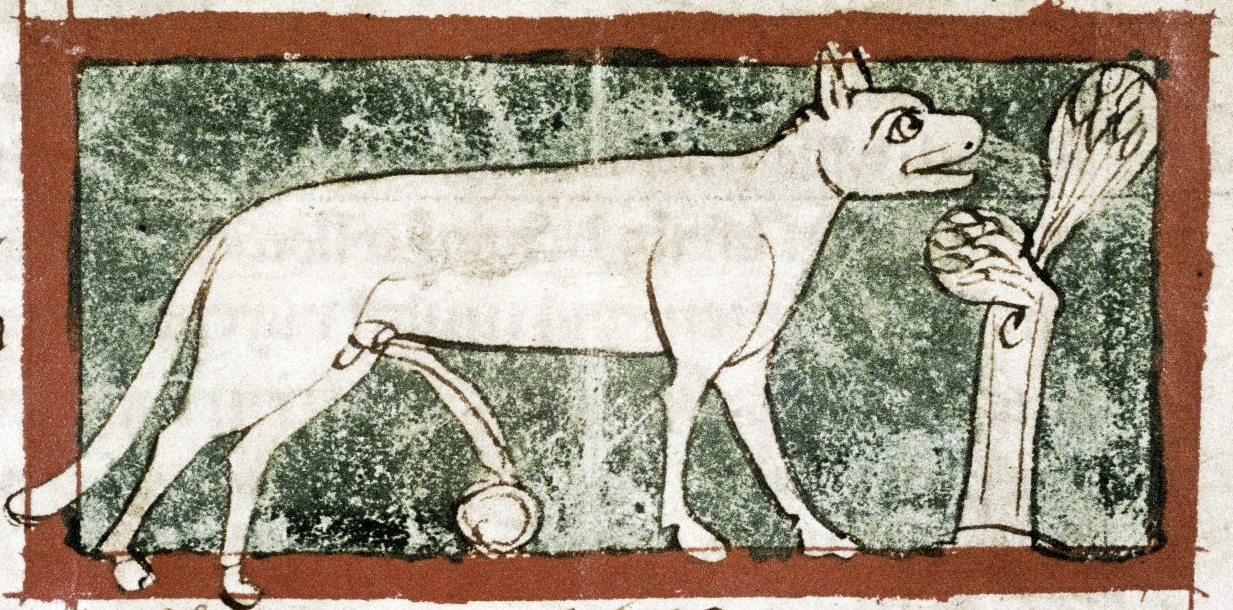
As is usual in bestiaries, the lynx in this late 13th-century English manuscript is shown urinating, the urine turning to the mythical stone Lyngurium

- Lyngurium (also Ligurium), the name of a mythical gemstone believed to be formed of the solidified urine of the lynx. (Medieval legend)
- Batrachite, gemstones that were supposedly found in frogs, to which ancient physicians and naturalists attributed the virtue of resisting poison. (Medieval legend)
- Draconite, a mythical gemstone taken from the head of a dragon and believed to have magical properties.
- Tide jewels, the kanju (干珠?, lit. "(tide-)ebbing jewel") and manju (満珠?, lit. "(tide-)flowing jewel") were magical gems that the Sea God used to control the tides. (Japanese mythology)
- Mermaid tears, Neptune forbade the mermaids to use their abilities to change the course of nature. In a horrible storm, one mermaid weathered the crossings for a ship. She had, over time, grown to fall in love with the ship's captain from afar. When she calmed the wind and waves to save the man's life, Neptune angrily exiled her to the depths of the ocean, and ordered her to never to swim to the surface again. Still, today, her brightly gleaming tears wash up on the shore as sea glass as a reminder of true love. (Medieval legend)
- Five-colored Jewel from a Dragon's Neck, a jewel that shines five colors found in a dragon's neck. One of Kaguya-hime's suitor set out to search for the jewel. (Japanese mythology)
- Hope Diamond, the diamond has been surrounded by a mythology of a reputed curse to the effect that it brings misfortune and tragedy to persons who own it or wear it, but there are strong indications that such stories were fabricated to enhance the stone's mystery and appeal, since increased publicity usually raised the gem's value and newsworthiness. Unsubstantiated legends claim that the original form of the Hope Diamond was stolen from an eye of a sculpted statue of the goddess Sita, the wife of Rama, the seventh Avatar of Vishnu.
- Flaming pearl (also Wish-granting pearl), oriental dragons are shown with a flaming pearl under their chin or in their claws. The pearl is associated with spiritual energy, wisdom, prosperity, power, immortality, thunder, or the moon. (Chinese mythology)
- Gem of Kukulkan, the Mayan god brought fire, earth, air, and water to the world. Kukulkan, though, only has the wind gem, and with it can control the air. (Maya mythology)

==== Gemstones from Hindu/Buddhist mythology ====
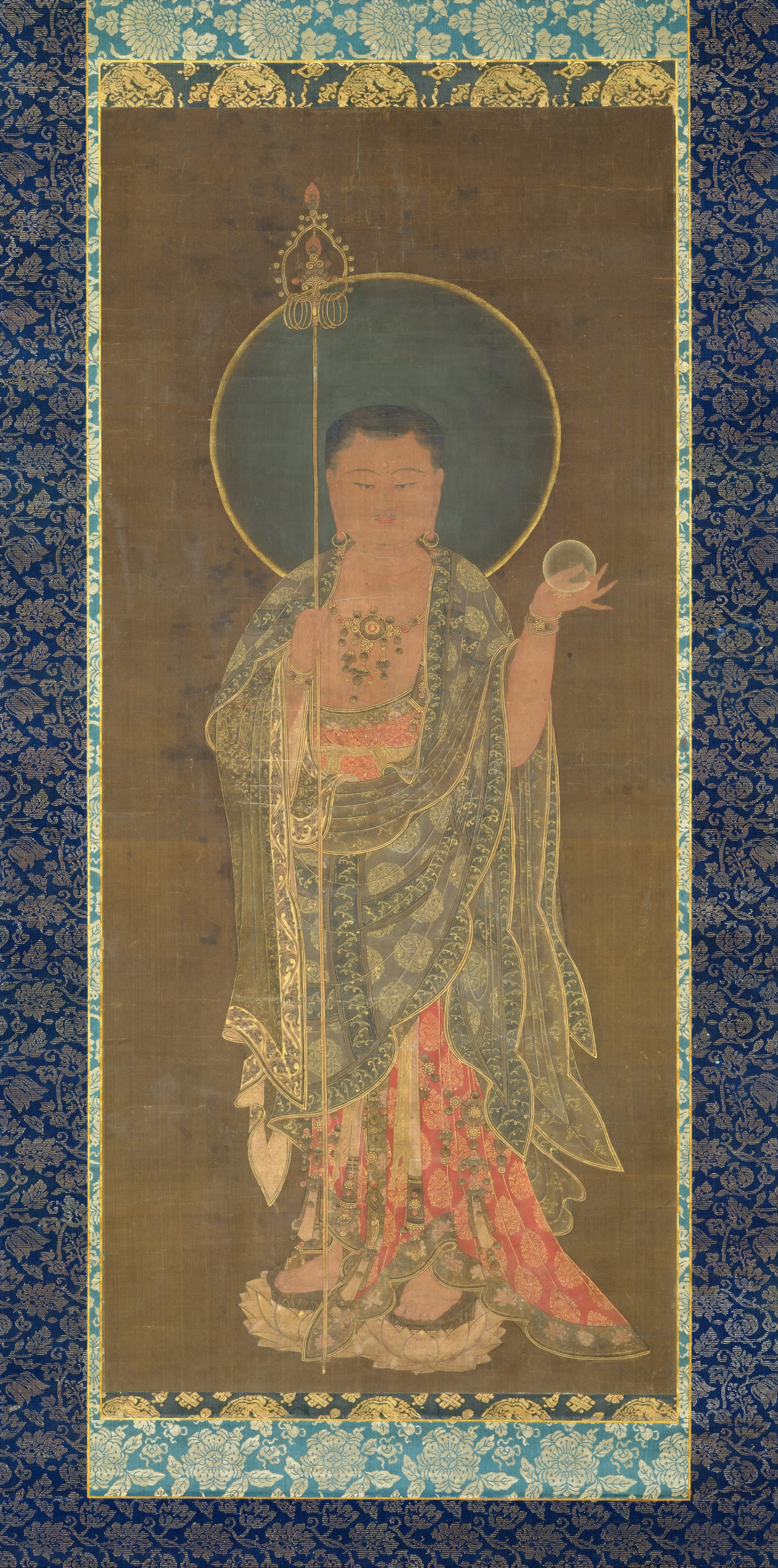
14th century Goryeo painting of Ksitigarbha holding a cintamani

- Cintamani (also Chintamani Stone), a wish-fulfilling jewel within both Hindu and Buddhist traditions, equivalent to the philosopher's stone in Western alchemy. (Hindu mythology/Buddhist mythology)
- Kaustubha is a divine jewel or "Mani", which is in the possession of Vishnu. (Hindu mythology)
- Navaratna are the sacred nine "royal gems". (Hindu mythology)
- Syamantaka (also Syamantakamani and Shyamantaka Jewel), the most famous jewel that is supposed to be blessed with magical powers. (Hindu mythology)

== Stones ==
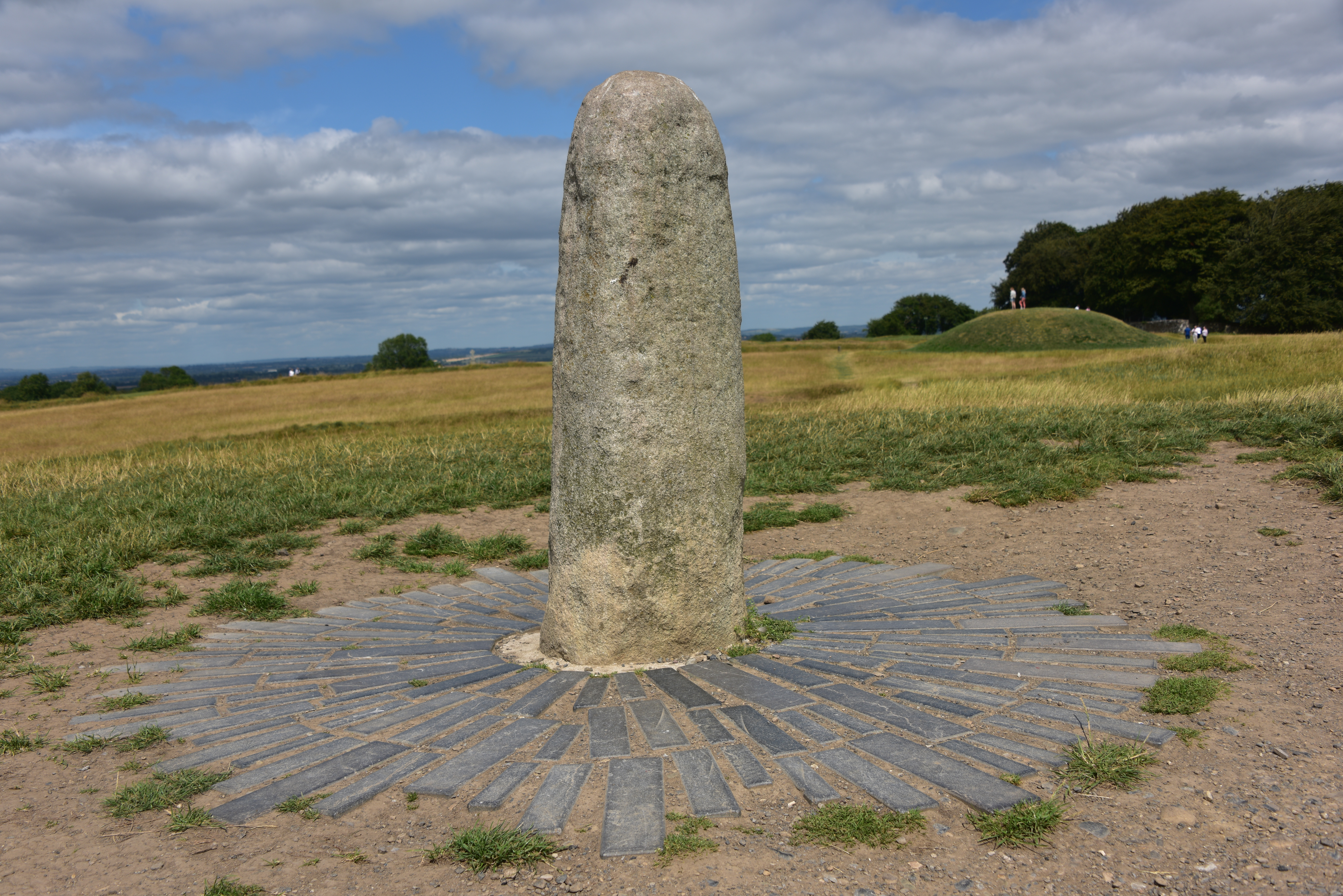
The Stone of Destiny (Lia Fáil) at the Hill of Tara, once used as a coronation stone for the High Kings of Ireland

- Baetyl, a sacred stone endowed with life. (Greek mythology)
- Bezoar, a stone believed to provide an antidote against any poison.
- Philosopher's stone, said to perform alchemy without an equal sacrifice being made, such as turning lead to gold, and creating something out of nothing. (Medieval legend)
- Sesshō-seki (also Killing Stone), a stone that kills anyone who comes into contact with it. (Japanese mythology)
- Stone of Giramphiel, a stone described in Diu Crône. Sir Gawain wins from the knight Fimbeus and it offers him protection against the fiery breath of dragons and the magic of the sorcerer Laamorz. (Arthurian legend)
- Singasteinn (Old Norse singing stone or chanting stone), an object that appears in the account of Loki and Heimdallr's fight in the form of seals. (Norse mythology)
- Llech Ronw (also Slate of Gron), a holed stone located along Afon Bryn Saeth in Blaenau Ffestiniog, Wales. The stone is described as being roughly forty inches by thirty inches with a hole of about an inch in diameter going through it. (Welsh mythology)
- Adder stone, believed to have magical powers such as protection against eye diseases or evil charms, preventing nightmares, curing whooping cough, the ability to see through fairy or witch disguises and traps if looked at through the middle of the stone, and recovery from snakebite. (Welsh mythology)
- Toadstone (also Bufonite), a mythical stone thought to be produced by a toad that provides an antidote to poison. (Medieval legend)
- Stone of Scone (also Stone of Destiny), an oblong block of red sandstone. (Matter of Britain)
- Sledovik, a sacred stone venerated in Slavic and Finnic pagan practices. (Slavic paganism)
- Lia Fáil (also Stone of Destiny), a stone at the Inauguration Mound on the Hill of Tara in County Meath, Ireland. In legend, all of the kings of Ireland were crowned on the stone up to Muirchertach mac Ercae c. AD 500. (Irish mythology)
- Thunderstone, throughout Europe, Asia, and Polynesia – flint arrowheads and axes turned up by farmer's plows are considered to have fallen from the sky. They were often thought to be thunderbolts and are called "thunderstones".
- Gjöll, the rock to which Fenrir the wolf is bound. (Norse mythology)
- Vaidurya, a precious stone worn by the goddesses Lakshmi and Rigveda. (Hindu Mythology)
- Seer stone, some early-nineteenth-century Americans used seer stones in attempts to gain revelations from God or to find buried treasure. From about 1819, Joseph Smith regularly practiced scrying, a form of divination in which a "seer" looked into a seer stone to receive supernatural knowledge. (Mormon mythology)
- Urim and Thummim, a set of seer stones bound in a breastplate, or by silver bows into a set of spectacles. (Mormon mythology)
- Lapis manalis (Stone of the Manes), was either of two sacred stones used in the Roman religion. One covered a gate to Pluto, abode of the dead; Festus called it ostium Orci, "the gate of Orcus". The other was used to make rain; this one may have no direct relationship with the Manes, but is instead derived from the verb manare, "to flow". The two stones had the same name. However, the grammarian Festus held the cover to the gate of the underworld and the rainmaking stone to be two distinct stones. (Roman mythology)
- Charmstone (charm-stone and charm stone), a stone or mineral artifact associated with various traditional cultures, including those of Scotland and the native cultures of California and the American southwest.
- Snakestones (also Serpentstones), fossilised ammonites were thought to be petrified coiled snakes, and were called snakestones. They were considered to be evidence for the actions of saints, such as Hilda of Whitby, a myth referenced in Sir Walter Scott's Marmion, and Saint Patrick, and were held to have healing or oracular powers. (Medieval legend)
- Benben, the mound that arose from the primordial waters Nu, and on which the creator god Atum settled. (Egyptian mythology)
- Omphalos, Zeus sent two eagles across the world to meet at its center, the "navel" of the world. Omphalos stones marking the center were erected in several places about the Mediterranean Sea; the most famous of those was at Delphi. Omphalos is also the name of the stone given to Cronus. (Greek mythology)
- Uluru (also Ayers Rock), the first tells of serpent beings who waged many wars around Uluru, scarring the rock. The second tells of two tribes of ancestral spirits who were invited to a feast, but were distracted by the beautiful Sleepy Lizard Women and did not show up. In response, the angry hosts sang evil into a mud sculpture that came to life as the dingo. There followed a great battle, which ended in the deaths of the leaders of both tribes. The earth itself rose up in grief at the bloodshed, becoming Uluru. (Australian Aboriginal mythology)
- Skofnung stone, a stone that can heal wounds made by the sword Skofnung. (Norse mythology)
- Colored Stones of Nüwa, five colored stones crafted by the goddess Nüwa that each represent one of the five Chinese elements, fire, water, earth, metal, and wood. (Chinese Mythology)
- Madstone, a special medicinal substance that, when pressed into an animal bite, was believed to prevent rabies by drawing the "poison" out. (American folklore)
- Alatyr, a sacred stone, the "father to all stones", the navel of the earth, containing sacred letters and endowed with healing properties. (Slavic folklore)
- Edun Ara, stones struck by lightning, used by Shango. (Yoruba mythology)

== Vehicles ==
- La Carreta Nagua (The Wagon), a haunted cart that is driven by Death and pulled by two skeletal oxen. It could supposedly be heard at night because of the sound of chains it made being dragged along the streets. (Nicaraguan culture)

=== Airborne ===
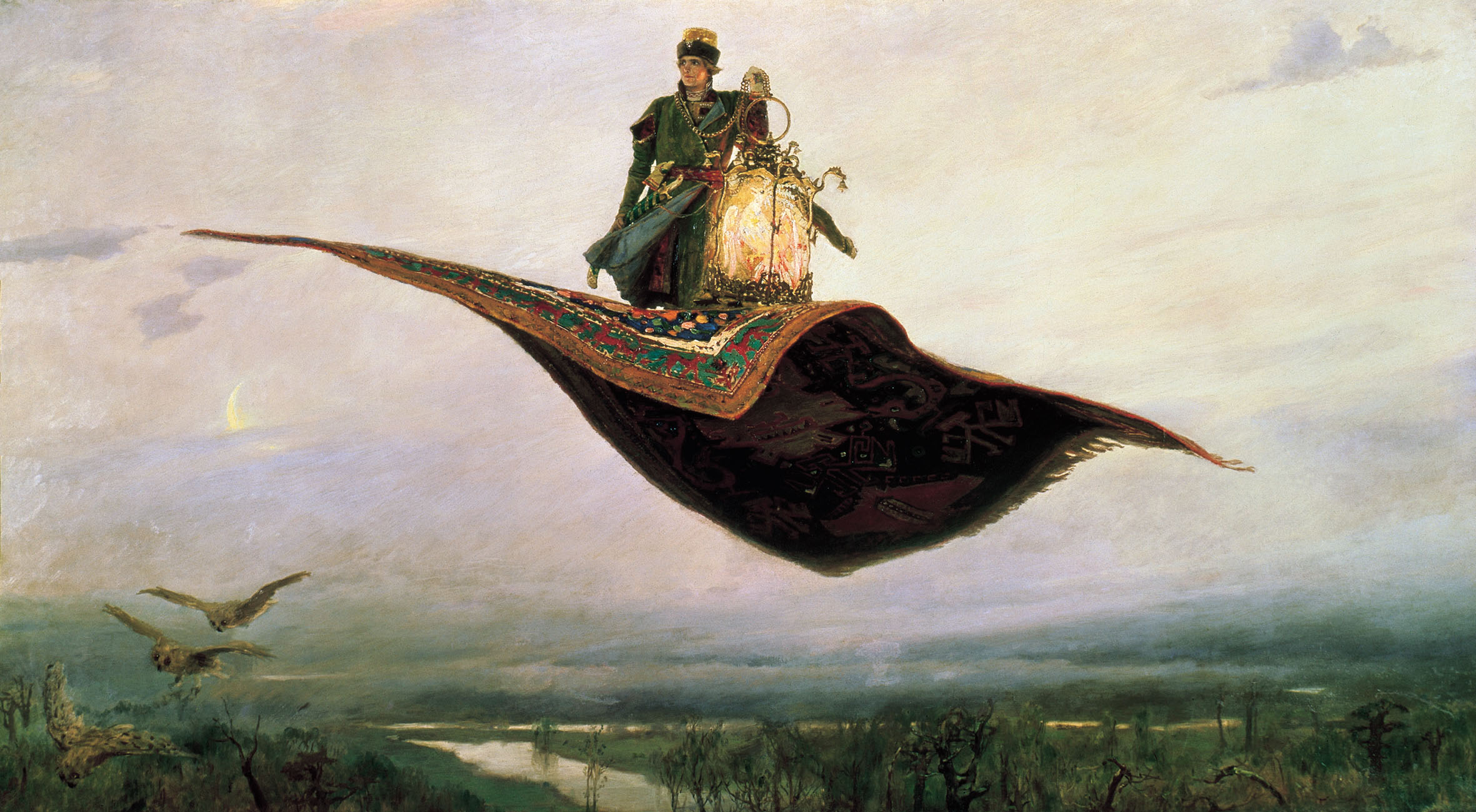
Riding a Flying Carpet, an 1880 painting by Viktor Vasnetsov

- Atet (also Sun Barge of Ra), the legendary boat that the Egyptian Solar deity Ra used to cross the sky during the day, and which bore his body through the Twelve Kingdoms of Knight. (Egyptian mythology)
- Flying mortar and pestle of Baba Yaga, she flies around in a mortar and using the pestle as a rudder. (Slavic Mythology)
- Magic carpet (also Flying carpet), a legendary carpet that can be used to transport humans who are on it instantaneously or quickly to their destination. (Arabian mythology)
- Flying Throne of Kai Kavus, an eagle-propelled craft built by the Persian king Kay Kāvus. It was used for flying the king all the way to China. (Persian mythology)
- Jamshid's flying throne, a golden throne that Jamshid built and ordered the demons to lift it from Babylon to Azerbaijan. According to the Shahnameh, people named that day Nowruz to commemorate this event.(Persian mythology)
- Roth Rámach (lit. Rowing Wheel), the magical flying machine of Mug Ruith, a mythological Irish Druid who along with his feathered headdress (the encennach), hovers across the skies . (Irish Mythology)
- Chasse-galerie (also Bewitched Canoe or Flying Canoe), Baptiste had a canoe with paddles, he made a pact with the devil so his canoe would fly wherever Baptiste wished. However, those within the canoe could not say the name of God, fly over a church, touch any crosses, or the canoe would crash. Baptiste uttered the magic words: "Acabris! Acabras! Acabram" to make the canoe fly. (Canadian folklore)
- Santa's sleigh, Santa Claus on a reindeer sleigh pulled by flying reindeer and help him deliver presents to children. (Modern folklore)
- Witch's broom, European witches are usually depicted flying on broomsticks, known as a besom. (Medieval legend)
- Lagâri Hasan Çelebi's rocket, Lagari Hasan Çelebi made a successful crewed rocket flight, launched in a 7-winged rocket using 50 okka (140 lbs) of gunpowder from Sarayburnu, the point below Topkapı Palace in Istanbul. (Ottoman legend)
- Nezha's wind and fire wheels, the Immortal Taiyi gave Nezha a wind-wheel and a fire-wheel. These were stood on whilst chanting incantations, to serve as a magic vehicle in the mythological story Fengshen Yanyi. (Chinese mythology)

=== Vimana from Hindu mythology ===
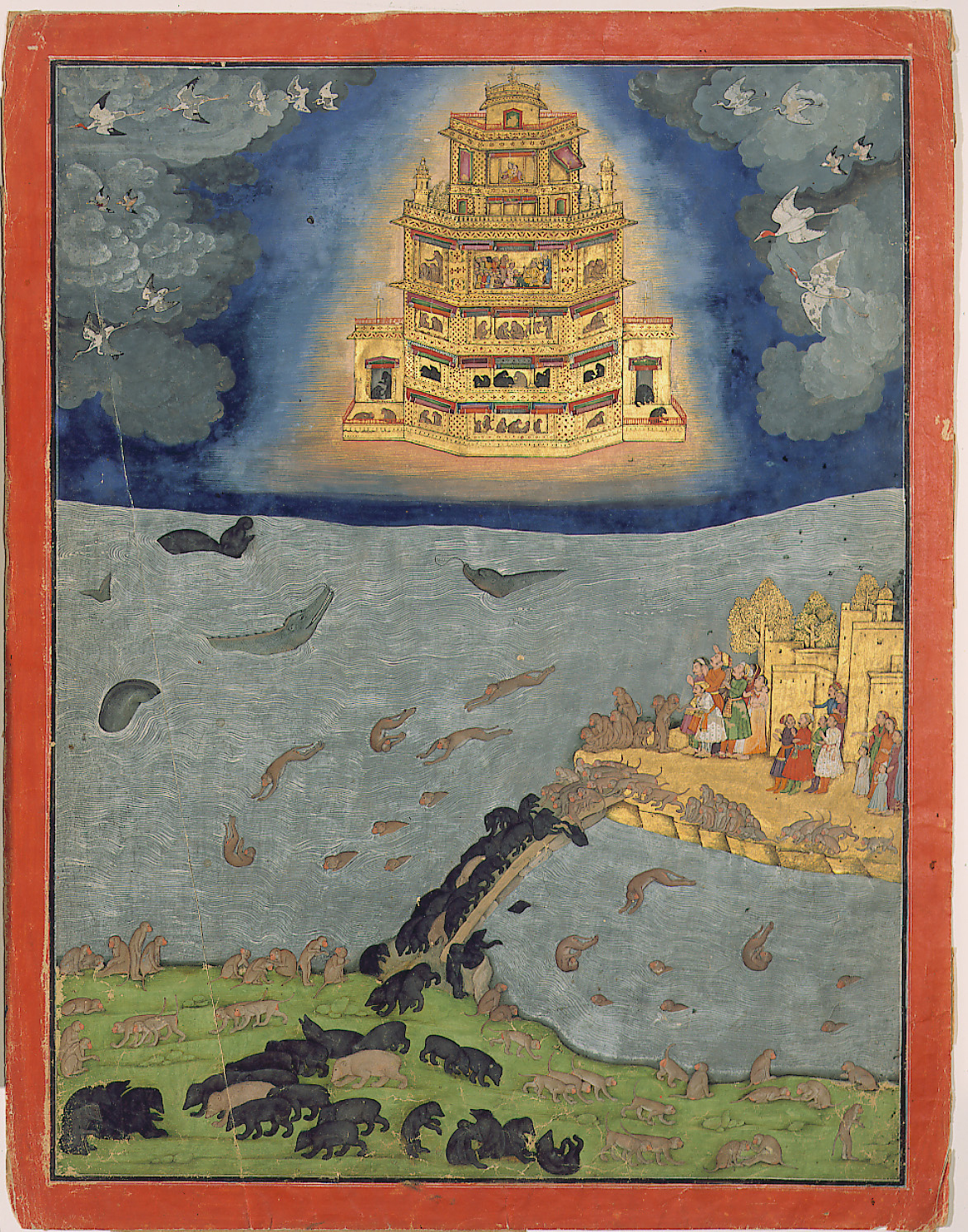
The Celestial Chariot, Pushpaka Vimana from Ramayana

- Pushpa Vimana (An Aeroplane with flowers), a mythical Aeroplane found in Ayyavazhi mythology. In Maharashtra, it is the Pushpak Viman (a heavenly aircraft shaped as an eagle) which took Saint Tukaram (a devotee of Vishnu) to heaven.
- Pushpaka Vimana or Dandu Monara – Pushpaka was originally made by Vishvakarma for Brahma, the Hindu god of creation; later Brahma gave it to Kubera, the god of wealth; but it was later stolen, along with Lanka, by his half-brother, the king Ravana.

=== Chariots ===
- Chariot of Morgan Mwynfawr, a chariot belonging to Morgan Mwynfawr which would quickly reach whatever destination one might wish to go to. (Welsh mythology)
- Flidais's chariot, a chariot drawn by deer. (Irish mythology)
- Hebo's chariot, a chariot pulled by two dragons. (Chinese mythology)
- Ukko's chariot, cause thunderstorms when Ukko drove his chariot through the skies. (Finnish mythology)

==== Chariots from Abrahamic Mythology ====
- Merkabah (chariot), Ezekiel's vision of the four-wheeled chariot driven by four hayyot, each of which has four wings and the four faces of a man, lion, ox, and eagle.
- Chariot of fire, the chariot that carried the prophet Elijah to heaven.

==== Chariots from Classical Greek and Roman mythology ====
- Aphrodite's chariot, Hephaestus presented Aphrodite with a golden chariot as bridal gift.
- Apollo's chariot, was pulled by his sacred swans. He also gave his lover Hyacinthus a swan-drawn chariot.
- Ares's chariots, Ares received his chariots from the forge of Hephaestus, they were pulled by immortal horses.
- Artemis's chariot, it was made of gold and was pulled by the four golden-horned deer she caught. The bridles of her chariot were also made of gold.
- Cabeiri's chariot, drawn by metallic, fire-breathing horses.
- Dionysus's chariot, drawn by panthers.
- Eos's chariot, drawn by two horses.
- Hades's chariot, golden chariot drawn by four black horses.
- Helios's chariot, a golden chariot drawn by four fiery horses driven across the sky by the Greek sun god, Helios. Also, according to Apollodorus, Helios owened a chariot, drawn by winged dragons, which he gave to his granddaughter Medea.
- Hera's chariot, a chariot drawn by peacocks.
- Nemesis's chariot, a chariot drawn by griffins.
- Poseidon's chariot, pulled by hippocampi.
- Rhea's chariot, drawn by lions.
- Selene's chariot, drawn across the night sky by her bulls or horses.
- Sol Invictus's chariot, depicted riding a quadriga on the reverse of a Roman coin.
- Zeus's chariot, drawn by the four directional winds (Anemoi) in horse-shape.

==== Chariots from Hindu and Ayyavazhi mythology ====
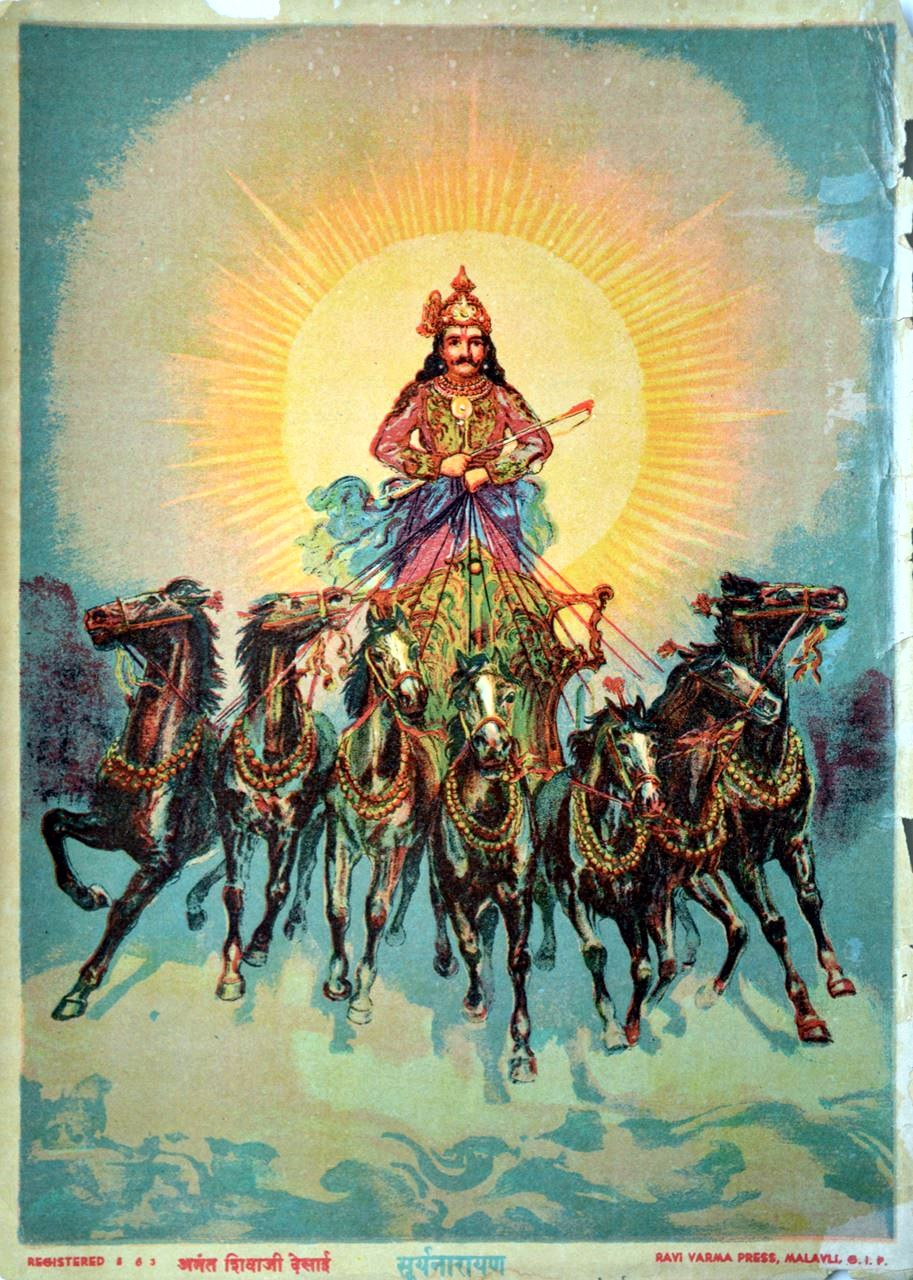
Surya on His Celestial Chariot

- Rahu's chariot, drawn by eight black horses. (Hindu mythology)
- Surya's chariot, drawn by seven horses. (Hindu mythology)
- Vitthakalai, a gold-decorated chariot of Kali. (Ayyavazhi mythology)

==== Chariots from Norse mythology ====
- Thor's chariot, driven across the sky by Thor and pulled by his two goats Tanngrisnir and Tanngnjóstr.
- Freyja's chariot, a chariot pulled by cats.
- Álfröðull (Elf-beam, Elf-disc or Elf-glory, Elf-heaven), referring both to the sun-chariot of the sun goddess Sól and to the rider Sól. Álfröðull is pulled by two horses, Árvakr and Alsviðr across the sky each day.

=== Ships ===
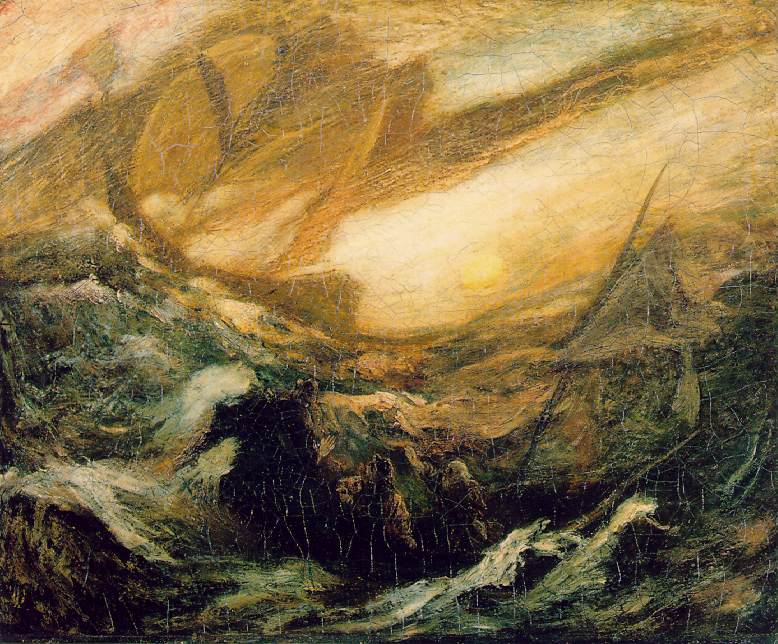
The Flying Dutchman

- Caleuche, a mythical ghost ship of the Chilote mythology and local folklore of the Chiloé Island, in Chile. (Chilote mythology)
- Canoe of Gluskab, able to expand so it could hold an army, or shrink to fit in the palm of your hand. (Abenaki mythology)
- Canoe of Māui, it became the South Island of New Zealand. (Māori mythology)
- Guingelot, Thomas Speght, an editor or Chaucer's works at the end of the 16th century, made a passing remark "Concerning Wade and his bote called Guingelot", and also his strange exploits in the same.
- The Preserver of Life, the ship built in the Epic of Gilgamesh by Utnapishtim and the craftspeople of his village at the request of Enki Ea to hold his wife and relatives, as well as the village craftspeople, the animals to be saved, and various grains and seeds. (Mesopotamian mythology)
- Wave Sweeper, a magic boat belonging to Lugh. (Irish mythology)
- Flying Dutchman, a legendary ghost ship that can never make port and is doomed to sail the oceans forever. (Nautical folklore)
- Mannigfual, the ship of the giants. (North-Frisian mythology)
- Prydwen (also Pridwen), the ship of King Arthur, according to the Welsh poem, The Spoils of Annwfn. This ship also appeared in Culhwch and Olwen, when Arthur traveled to Ireland, to fetch the cauldron of Diwrnach and the boar Twrch Trwyth. In later Arthurian legend, Pridwen was the name of Arthur's shield. (Arthurian legend)
- Noah's Ark, the vessel by which God spares Noah, his family, and a remnant of all the world's animals from the flood. (Christian mythology)
- Chinese treasure ship (also Baochuan), a large wooden ship in the fleet of admiral Zheng He, who led seven voyages during the early 15th-century Ming dynasty. (Chinese mythology)
- Takarabune (Treasure Ship), a mythical ship piloted through the heavens by the Seven Lucky Gods during the first three days of the New Year. (Japanese folklore)
- Mendam Berahi, a legendary flagship of Malacca Sultanate. (Malay folklore)
- Ghost Ship of Northumberland Strait, a ghost ship said to sail ablaze within the Northumberland Strait. (Canadian folklore)
- Mahogany Ship, a putative early Australian shipwreck that is believed by some to lie beneath the sand in the Armstrong Bay area, approximately 3 to 6 kilometres west of Warrnambool in southwest Victoria, Australia. (Australian folklore)
- Lohengrin's boat, a swan-drawn boat. (Medieval legend)
- White Ship, also called the valge laev, is mythical ship that brings freedom or takes people away to a better land. (Estonian mythology)

==== Ships from Egyptian mythology ====
- Atet, the solar barge of the sun god Ra. It was also known as the Mandjet (Egyptian for "The Boat of Millions of Years") and, during the night, as the Mesektet.
- Matet, (Growing Stronger), the first of two boats traveled in by Ra, the sun god as he traveled the sky daily with the sun on his head. During the period between dawn and noon, Ra occupies the Matet boat.
- Seqtet, (Growing Weaker), the second six hours of the day (from noon till dusk) in Ancient Egyptian belief. It was preceded by the Matet boat. The Seqtet boat is represented by the Sun as Ra, and Ra as a boat since it sails across the sky like a boat on water.
- Neshmet, a vessel belonging to the god Nun. Osiris was transported in it on the river Nile during the Osiris festival at Abydos.
- Hennu (also Hennu boat and Henu), the boat of the god Seker. Depending on the era or the prevailing dynasty of Egypt, the Hennu sailed toward either dawn or dusk.

==== Ships from Greek mythology ====
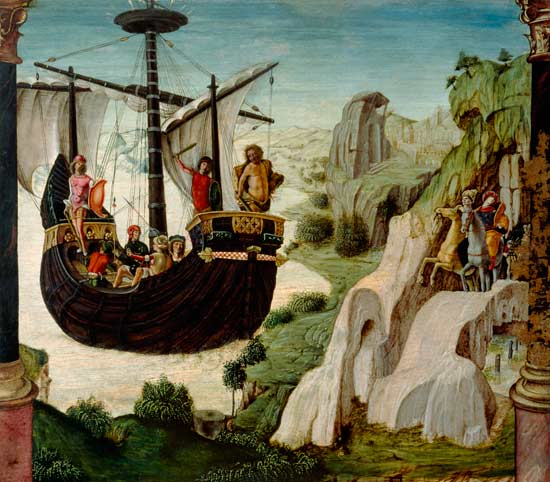
The Argo (c. 1500 – 1530), painting by Lorenzo Costa

- Argo, the ship on which Jason and the Argonauts sailed. She contained in her prow a magical piece of timber from the sacred forest of Dodona, which could speak and render prophecies.
- Phaeacian ships, in the Odyssey, are described as being as fast as a falcon, steered by thought and requiring no helmsman, and able to travel even through mist or fog without any danger of being shipwrecked.
- Boat of Charon, which carries souls of the newly deceased across the rivers Styx and Acheron that divided the world of the living from the world of the dead.
- Ship of Theseus, the ship Theseus rode on his trip to kill Minotaur. He set off with a black sail, promising to his father, Aegeus, that if successful he would return with a white sail. Theseus forgot to put up the white sails instead of the black ones, however, so Aegeus, believing his son was dead, committed suicide by throwing himself into the sea, leading this body of water to be named Aegean Sea. This ship is more famous as the thought experiment Ship of Theseus.

==== Ships from Norse mythology ====
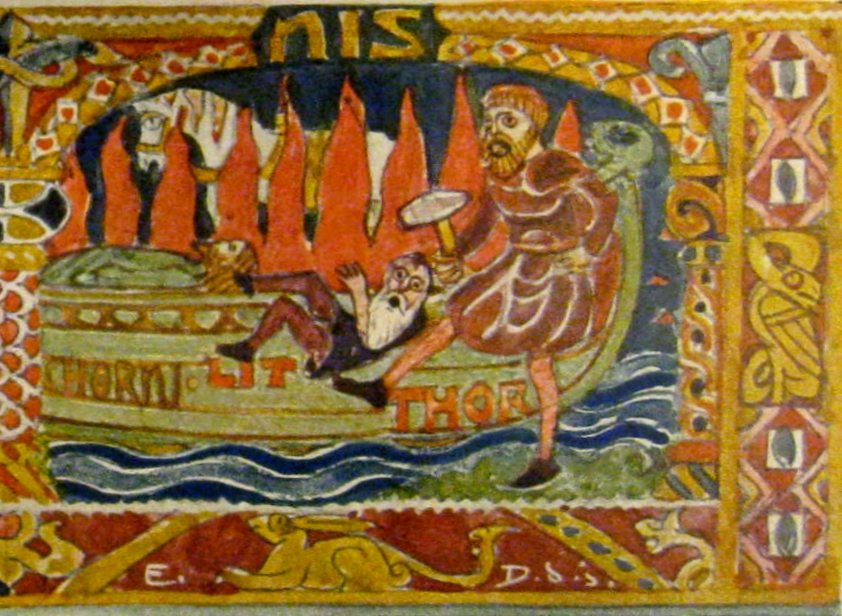
Thor kicks Litr onto Baldr's Hringhorni, illustration by Emil Doepler (ca. 1905)

- Ellida, a magic dragon ship given to Víking as a gift by Aegir.
- Hringhorni, the ship of the god Baldr, described as the "greatest of all ships".
- Naglfar, a ship made out of fingernails and toenails of the dead. It will set sail during Ragnarök.
- Sessrúmnir, is both the goddess Freyja's hall located in Fólkvangr, a field where Freyja receives half of those who die in battle, and also the name of a ship.
- Skíðblaðnir, a boat owned by Freyr.
- Ullr's bone, Ullr could traverse the sea on his magic bone.

=== Trains ===
- The Silver Train of Stockholm (Silverpilen, "the Silver Arrow"), a silver colored ghost train said to roam the Stockholm Metro as part of several urban legends. (Swedish folklore)
- St. Louis Ghost Train, visible at night along an old abandoned rail line in between Prince Albert and St. Louis, Saskatchewan. (Canadian legend)
- Phantom funeral train, a funeral train decorated in black bunting said to run regularly from Washington, D.C. to Springfield, Illinois, around the anniversary of Abraham Lincoln's death, stopping watches and clocks in surrounding areas as it passes. (American folklore)

=== Unidentified flying objects ===
- Black triangle, UFOs reported as having a triangular shape and dark color, typically observed at night, described as large, silent, hovering, moving slowly, and displaying pulsating, colored lights. (Ufology)
- Flying saucer (also Flying disc), a supposed type of flying craft having a disc or saucer-shaped body, commonly used generically to refer to an anomalous flying object. (Ufology)
- Foo fighter, a type of UFO reported and named by the U.S. 415th Special Operations Squadron, the term was also commonly used to mean any UFO sighting from that period. (Ufology)

== Treasures ==
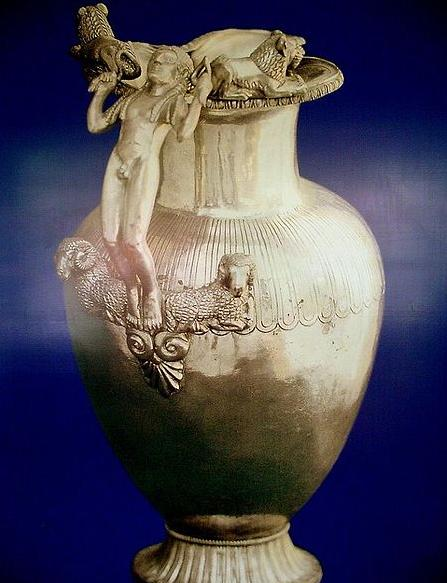
Jug from Lydian Treasure Usak

- Four Treasures of the Tuatha Dé Danann (also Hallows of Ireland), consisting of the Claíomh Solais, Lug's Spear, Cauldron of the Dagda, and the Lia Fáil. (Celtic mythology)
- Jamshid's Enchanted treasures, Hidden treasures in Iranian folklore that Jamshid has hidden all over the world, which are protected by all kinds of spells, demons and magical monsters.(Persian mythology)
- Three Sacred Treasures of Japan, consisting of the Kusanagi, the jewel necklace Yasakani no Magatama, and the mirror Yata no Kagami. (Japanese mythology)
- Karun Treasure, said to belong to King Croesus of Lydia. (Persian mythology)
- Thirteen Treasures of the Island of Britain, consisting of the Dyrnwyn, the Hamper of Gwyddno Garanhir, the Horn of Brân Galed, the Chariot of Morgan Mwynfawr, the Halter of Clydno Eiddyn, the Knife of Llawfrodedd the Horseman, the Cauldron of Dyrnwch the Giant, the Whetstone of Tudwal Tudglyd, the Coat of Padarn Beisrudd, the Crock and Dish of Rhygenydd Ysgolhaig, the Chessboard of Gwenddoleu ap Ceidio, the Mantle of Arthur in Cornwall, the Mantle of Tegau Gold-Breast, and the Stone and Ring of Eluned the Fortunate. (Matter of Britain)
- Rheingold (also Rhinegold), a hoard of gold in the Nibelungenlied where three Rheinmaidens swim and protect the treasure. (Norse mythology)
- Yamashita's gold, also referred to as the Yamashita treasure, is the name given to the alleged war loot stolen in Southeast Asia by Imperial Japanese forces during World War II and hidden in caves, tunnels, underground complexes, or just underground in the Philippines—most commonly the island of Mindanao. According to the legend, it is named after the Japanese general Tomoyuki Yamashita, nicknamed "The Tiger of Malaya". (Japanese urban legends)
- Eight Treasures, consisting of the wish-granting pearl (flaming pearl), the double lozenges, the stone chime, the pair of rhinoceros horns, the double coins, the gold or silver ingot, coral, and the wish-granting scepter. (Chinese mythology)
- Nidhi (also Nidhana, Nikhara, or Sevadhi) is a treasure, which consists of nine precious objects (navanidhi) belonging to Kubera, god of wealth. (Hindu mythology)
- Štěchovice treasure, a purported hoard of Nazi treasure. It is said to be hidden in the town of Štěchovice in the Central Bohemian Region of the Czech Republic. (Czech legend)
- Nazi gold train (also Wałbrzych gold train), a Nazi Germany-era train buried in a tunnel in Lower Silesia between Breslau (Wrocław) and Waldenburg (Wałbrzych) in May 1945 during the last days of World War II. (Polish legend)
- Confederate gold, a hidden cache of gold lost after the American Civil War. Millions of dollars' worth of gold was lost or unaccounted for after the war and has been the speculation of many historians and treasure hunters. Allegedly, some of the Confederate treasury was hidden in order to wait for the rising again of the South and at other times simply so that the Union would not gain possession. (American legend)
- Lasseter's Reef – A fabulously rich gold deposit said to have been discovered – and then subsequently lost – by bushman Harold Bell Lasseter in a remote and desolate corner of central Australia towards the end of the 19th century. (Australian folklore)

=== Relics ===
==== Relics from Buddhist mythology ====
- Cetiya, "reminders" or "memorials" (Sanskrit caitya) are objects and places used by Theravada Buddhists to remember Gautama Buddha.
- Relic of the tooth of the Buddha, venerated in Sri Lanka as a cetiya "relic" of Gautama Buddha, the founder of Buddhism.
- Śarīra, a generic term referring to Buddhist relics. In Buddhism, relics of the Buddha and various sages are venerated. After the Buddha's death, his remains were divided into eight portions. Afterward, these relics were enshrined in stupas wherever Buddhism was spread.

==== Relics from Christian mythology ====
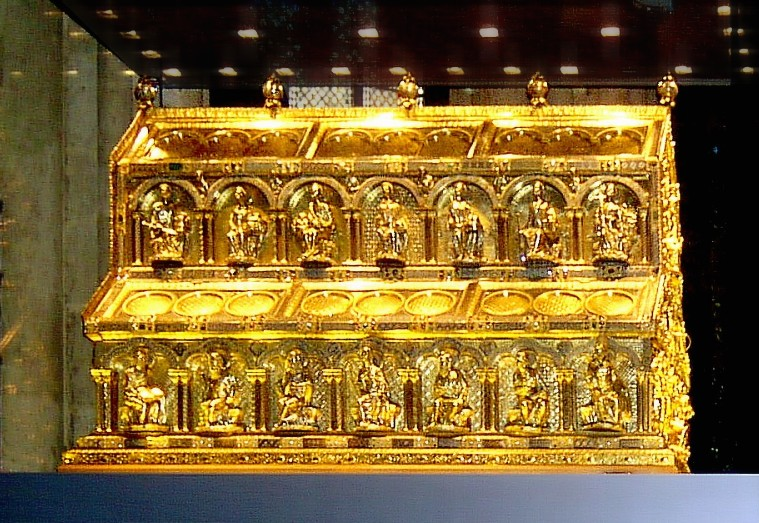
The Shrine of the Three Kings in Cologne Cathedral

- Relics of Jesus, a number of relics associated with Jesus that have been claimed and displayed throughout the history of Christianity.
- Shrine of the Three Kings (German Dreikönigsschrein), a reliquary said to contain the bones of the Biblical Magi, also known as the Three Kings or the Three Wise Men.

==== Relics from Islamic mythology ====
- Sacred Relics (also Holy Relics and Sacred Trust), consist of religious pieces sent to the Ottoman Sultans between the 16th century to the late 19th century.
- Sacred Cloak of the Prophet, a cloak believed to have been worn by the Islamic prophet Muhammad.

== Books ==
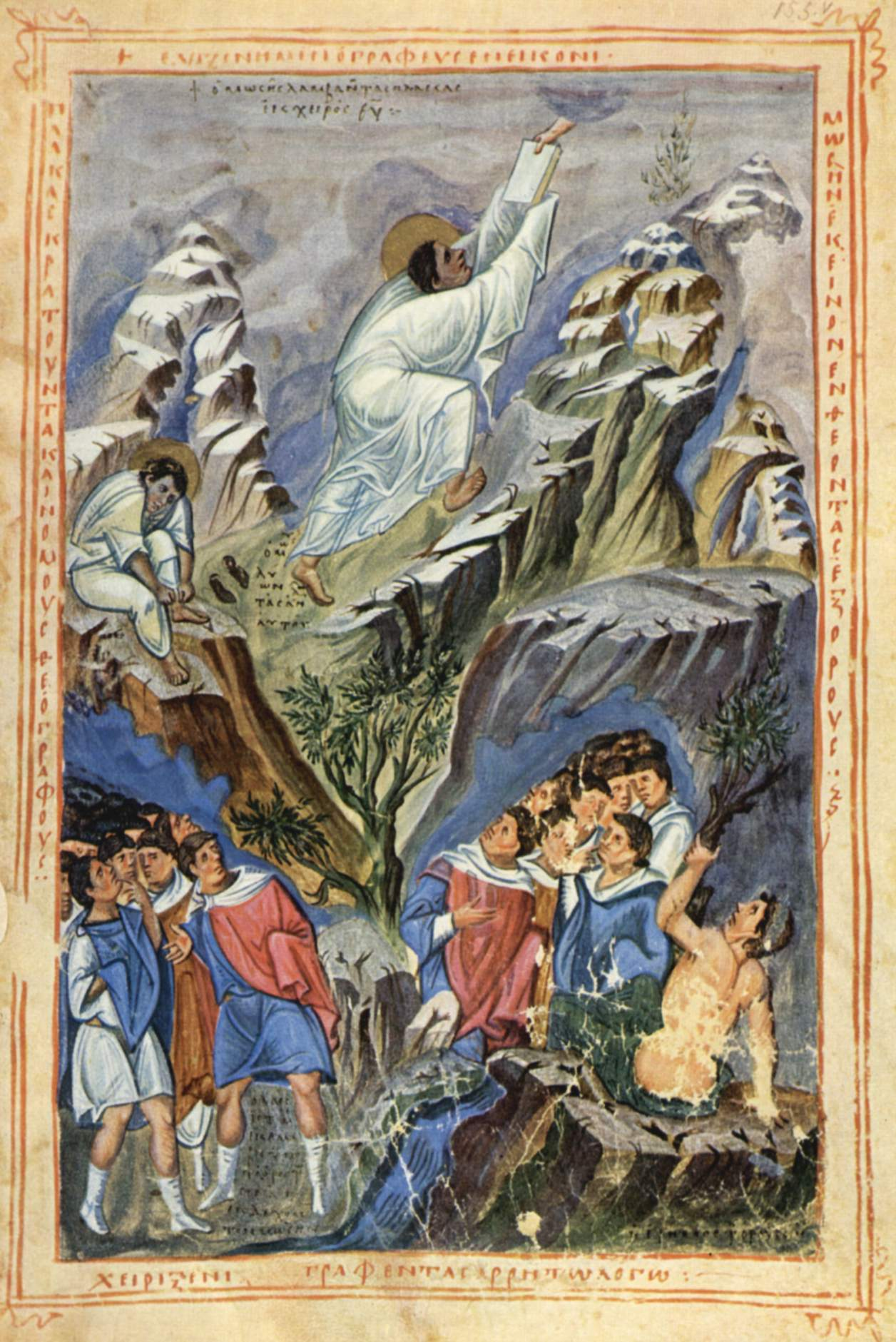
Rectangular tablets passed down by the Hand of God in the 10th century Byzantine Leo Bible

- Book of Thoth, a legendary book containing powerful spells and knowledge supposed to have been written by the god Thoth, said to have been buried with the Prince Neferkaptah in Coptos. (Egyptian mythology)
- Jade Books in Heaven, described in several Daoist cosmographies as existent primordially in the various divine Heavens. These Jade Books are variously said to be instrumental in creating and maintaining the divine structure of the universe, or as regulating national or personal destiny. (Chinese mythology)
- Sibylline Books, described to have helped Rome in many situations. (Roman mythology)
- Rauðskinna (Book of Power), a legendary book about black magic, alleged to have been buried with its author, the Bishop Gottskálk grimmi Nikulásson of Holar. (Scandinavian folklore)
- Tablet of Destinies (also Tupsimati), a set of clay tablets which hold the power of creation and destruction. (Mesopotamian mythology)
- Tablets of Stone (also Tablets of Stone, Stone Tablets, or Tablets of Testimony), in the Hebrew Bible, were the two pieces of stone inscribed with the Ten Commandments when Moses ascended Mount Sinai as written in the Book of Exodus. (Jewish mythology)
- Book of Life, the book in which God records the names of every person who is destined for Heaven or the World to Come. (Christian/Jewish)
- Levisterio, a book contains magical forms and an instrument they used to take various exams used by the Mapuches to protect by the dark forces. (Chilote/Mapuche)

== Cauldrons ==
- Eldhrímnir, the cauldron in which Andhrímnir cooks Sæhrímnir. (Norse mythology)
- Pair Dadeni (Cauldron of Rebirth), a magical cauldron able to revive the dead. (Welsh mythology)
- Cauldron of the Dagda, a cauldron where no company ever went away from it unsatisfied, it is said to be bottomless. (Celtic mythology)
- Cauldron of Hymir, a mile-wide cauldron which the Æsir wanted to brew beer in. (Norse mythology)
- Cauldron of Dyrnwch the Giant, said to discriminate between cowards and brave men: whereas it would not boil meat for a coward, it would boil quickly if that meat belonged to a brave man. (Welsh mythology)
- The Cauldron of Cerridwen, which features in the origin story of Taliesin, who accidentally obtains the awen from it while stirring it for Cerridwen. (Welsh mythology)

== Botany ==
- Anāre-Javdanegi, In some religious traditions, it is said that Zoroaster made Esfandiyār invulnerable by eating a few pomegranate seeds from heaven.(Persian mythology)
- Blue Lotus, a symbol of the sun, since the flowers are closed at night and open again in the morning. The origin of the world was taught to have been when the sun god Ra emerged from a lotus flower growing in "primordial waters". At night, he was believed to retreat into the flower again. (Egyptian mythology)
- Magic bean, Jack trades the family cow for a handful of magic beans which caused a gigantic beanstalk to grow outside Jack's window during the night. (British fairy tale)
- Mandrake, In the past, mandrake was often made into amulets which were believed to bring good fortune, cure sterility, etc. In one superstition, people who pull up this root will be condemned to hell, and the mandrake root would scream and cry as it was pulled from the ground, killing anyone who heard it.
- White Lotus, the Egyptians believed that the lotus flower gave them strength and power. Horus was occasionally shown in art as a naked boy with a finger in his mouth sitting on a lotus with his mother. (Egyptian mythology)
- Vegetable Lamb of Tartary, is a believed to grow sheep as its fruit. (Central Asian legend)

=== Plants and herbs ===
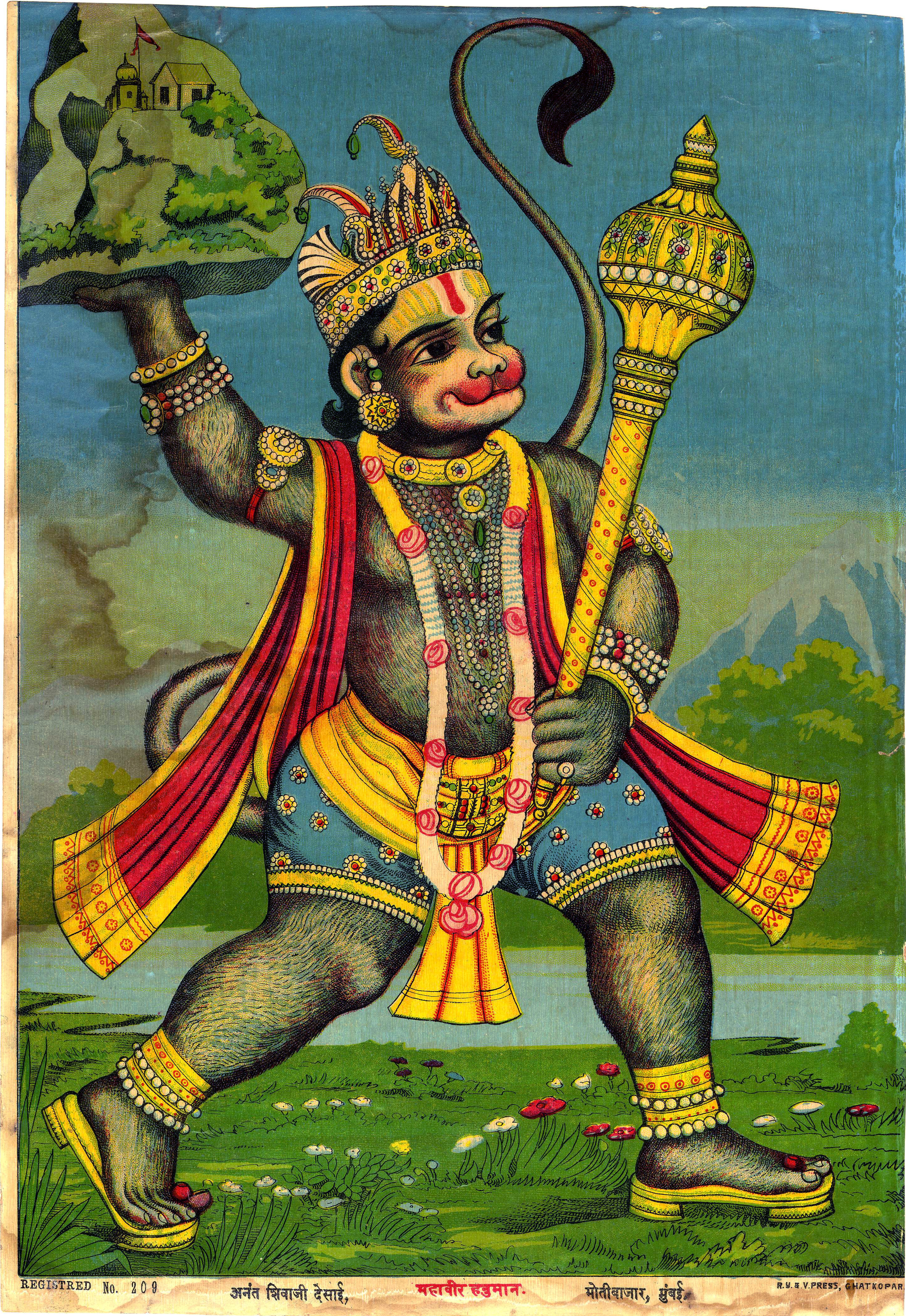
Hanuman fetches the herb-bearing mountain, in a print from the Ravi Varma Press, 1910's

- Aglaophotis, a herb used for warding off demons, witchcraft, and fever.
- Fern flower, a magic flower that blooms on the eve of the Summer solstice. It will bring fortune to the person who finds it. (Baltic and Slavic mythology)
- Gaokerena, was a mythic Haoma plant that had healing properties and gave immortality to the resurrected bodies of the dead when eaten. (Persian mythology)
- Hungry grass (also Féar Gortach), a patch of cursed grass which causes perpetual and insatiable hunger. (Irish mythology)
- Moly, a magical herb Hermes gave to Odysseus to protect him from Circe's magic. (Greek mythology)
- Raskovnik, a magical herb which can unlock or uncover anything that is locked or closed. (Slavic mythology)
- Ausadhirdipyamanas, healing plants used for healing and rejuvenations in battles. These are used by Ashvins. (Hindu mythology)
- Haoma, the Avestan language name of a plant and its divinity, both of which play a role in Zoroastrian doctrine and in later Persian culture and mythology. (Persian mythology)
- Silphium, a plant that was used in classical antiquity as a seasoning and as a medicine. Legend said that this plant was a gift from the god Apollo. (Roman mythology)
- Verbena, a plant which has long been associated with divine and other supernatural forces. It was called "tears of Isis" in ancient Egypt, and later called "Hera's tears". In ancient Greece it was dedicated to Eos Erigineia. In the early Christian era, folk legend stated that V. officinalis was used to staunch Jesus' wounds after his removal from the cross. It was consequently called "holy herb" or (e.g. in Wales) "Devil's bane".
- Yao Grass, a type of mythical plant. (Chinese mythology)
- Shamrock, a plant honored as sacred by ancient Druids. The Druids believed the shamrock had the power to avert evil spirits. Some people still believe the shamrock has mystical, even prophetic powers. It is said that the leaves of shamrocks turn upright whenever a storm is coming. (Irish mythology)
- Sanjivani, a magical herb which can cure any malady. It was believed that medicines prepared from this herb could revive a dead person. (Hindu mythology)

=== Trees ===
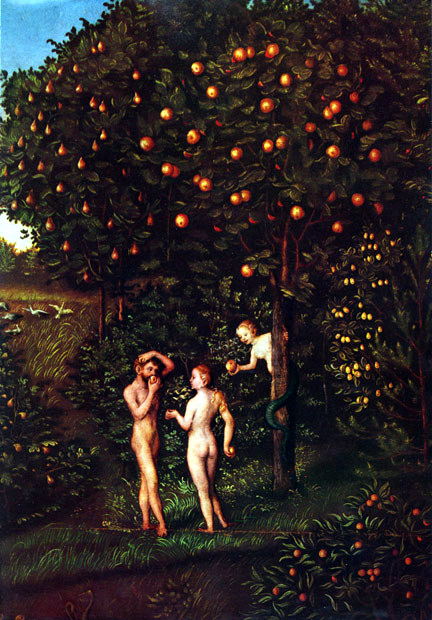
"The Fall of Man" by Lucas Cranach the Elder and the Tree of Knowledge is on the right

- Talking tree, a form of trees in sapient mythologies and stories. (Worldwide)
- Jeweled Branch of Hōrai, a branch from a tree found on Hōrai which has jewels for leaves. One of Kaguya-hime's suitors set out to search for the branch. (Japanese mythology)
- Cypress of Kashmar, a mythical cypress tree of legendary beauty. Iranians considered Kashmir cypress as a relic of Zoroaster, and they believed that Vishtaspa ordered the planting of this cypress after accepting the Zoroastrianism. (Persian mythology)
- Ficus Ruminalis, a wild fig tree that had religious and mythological significance in ancient Rome. The tree is associated with the legend of Romulus and Remus. (Roman mythology)
- Donar's Oak (also Thor's Oak and Jove's Oak), a sacred tree of the Germanic pagans located in what is now the region of Hesse, Germany. (Germanic mythology)
- Silver Branch, a tree that represents entry into the Celtic Otherworld. It is also associated with Manannán mac Lir, an Irish sea deity with strong affiliation to Tír na nÓg. As guardian of the Otherworld, Manannán also has strong ties with Emhain Abhlach, the Isle of Apple Trees, where the magical silver apple branch is found. (Irish mythology)
- Lotus tree, bearing a fruit that caused drowsiness, and which was said to be the only food of an island people called the Lotophagi or Lotus-eaters. When they ate of the lotus tree they would forget their friends and homes and would lose the desire to return to their native land in favor of living in idleness. (Greek mythology/Roman mythology)
- Money tree, a holy tree which can bring money and fortune to the people, and is a symbol of affluence, nobility and auspiciousness. (Chinese mythology)
- Tree of life, a tree found in the Garden of Eden in the Book of Genesis in the beginning, and also in New Jerusalem in Book of Revelation in the end. (Christian mythology/Jewish mythology)
- Tree of the knowledge of good and evil, one of two trees in the story of the Garden of Eden, along with the tree of life. (Christian mythology/Jewish mythology)
- Zaqqum (Zakum), a vile tree that grows in the depths of Jahannam (Hell). (Islamic mythology)
- Nariphon, a tree which bears fruit in the shape of young female creatures. (Buddhist mythology)

==== Trees from Norse mythology ====
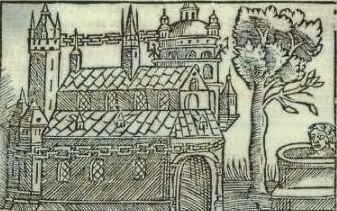
Image showing the sacred tree to the right of the temple, from Olaus Magnus' Historia de Gentibus Septentrionalibus (1555). To the right of the tree is a depiction of a man being sacrificed in the spring

- Barnstokkr (Child-trunk), a tree that stands in the center of King Völsung's hall.
- Glasir (Gleaming), a tree or grove described as "the most beautiful among gods and men", bearing golden leaves located in the realm of Asgard, outside the doors of Valhalla.
- Læraðr, a tree that is often identified with Yggdrasil. It stands at the top of the Valhöll. Two animals, the goat Heiðrún and the hart Eikþyrnir, graze its foliage.
- Mímameiðr (Mimi's Tree), a tree whose branches stretch over every land, is unharmed by fire or metal, bears fruit that assists pregnant women, and upon whose highest bough roosts the rooster Víðópnir.
- Sacred tree at Uppsala, a sacred tree located at the Temple at Uppsala, Sweden, in the second half of the 11th century. It is not known what species it was, but a scholar has suggested that it was a yew tree.

==== World trees ====
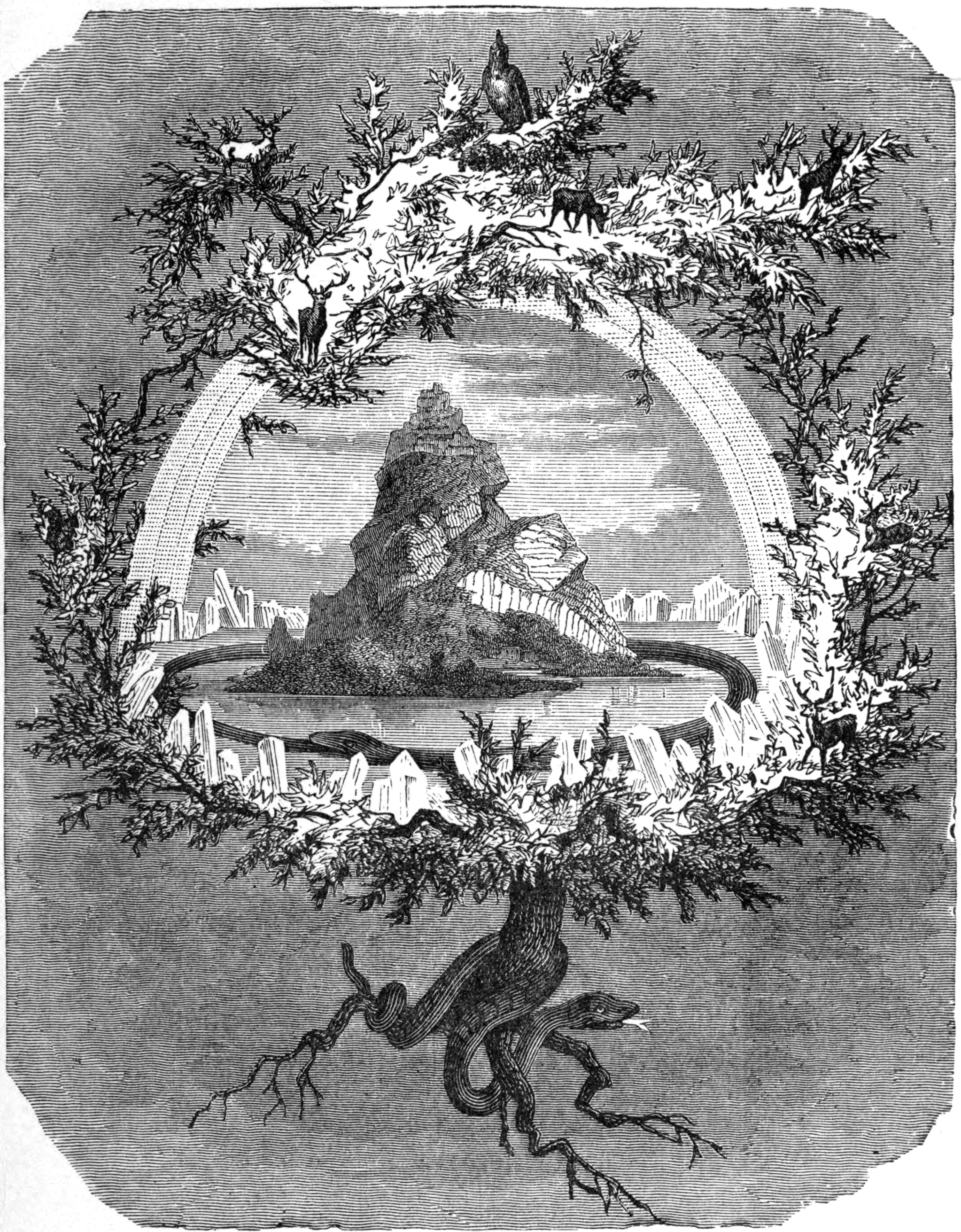
The Ash Yggdrasil by Friedrich Wilhelm Heine

- Yggdrasil, an immense tree that connects the nine worlds. (Norse mythology)
- Sefirot, (counting, enumeration) the kabbalistic tree of life which encompasses both the physical and higher metaphysical realm. It consists of the ten attributes/emanations in Kabbalah. (Jewish mythology)
- Irminsul (Great/Mighty Pillar or Arising Pillar), a pillar which is attested as playing an important role in the Germanic paganism of the Saxon people. The oldest chronicle describing an Irminsul refers to it as a tree trunk erected in the open air. (Germanic mythology)
- Égig érő fa (Sky-high Tree), also called Életfa (Tree of Life), Világfa (World Tree), or Tetejetlen Fa (Tree Without a Top), is an element of Hungarian shamanism and native faith, and a typical element of Hungarian folk art and folk tales, and also a distinct folk tale type. (Hungarian mythology)
- Akshayavat or Akshay Vat (Indestructible Banyan Tree), is a sacred fig tree. The sage Markandeya asked Lord Narayana to show him a specimen of the divine power. Narayana flooded the entire world for a moment, during which only the Akshayavat could be seen above the water level. (Hindu mythology)
- Kalpavriksha (also Kalpataru, Kalpadruma or Kalpapādapa), a wish-fulfilling divine tree. (Hindu mythology)
- Ashvattha (also Assattha), a sacred tree for the Hindus and has been extensively mentioned in texts pertaining to Hinduism, mentioned as 'peepul' (Ficus religiosa) in Rig Veda mantra I.164.20 . Buddhist texts term the tree as Bodhi tree, a tree under which Gautam Buddha meditated and gained enlightenment. (Hindu mythology)
- Ağaç Ana, the world tree is a central symbol. According to the Altai Turks, human beings are descended from trees. According to the Yakuts, White Mother sits at the base of Ağaç Ana, whose branches reach to the heavens where it is occupied by various creatures that have come to life there. The blue sky around the tree reflects the peaceful nature of the country and the red ring that surrounds all of the elements symbolizes the ancient faith of rebirth, growth and development of the Turkic peoples. (Turkic mythology)
- Modun, the world tree. (Mongolian mythology)
- Mesoamerican world tree, the world trees embodied the four cardinal directions, which also serve to represent the fourfold nature of a central world tree, a symbolic axis mundi which connects the planes of the Underworld and the sky with that of the terrestrial realm. (Mesoamerican mythology)
- Austras koks (Tree of Dawn), on the path of the sun, in or by the water, often on an island or rock in middle of the seas, is the Austras koks thought to represent world tree or axis mundi, it is usually described as a tree, but can also be variety of other plants or even objects. (Latvian mythology)
- Világfa (World Tree)/Életfa (Tree of Life), the world tree connects different realities; the underworld, this world, and the upper world together. A shaman was believed to be able to climb through each of these levels freely by a ladder. (Finnic mythologies)

== Foods ==
=== Drinks ===
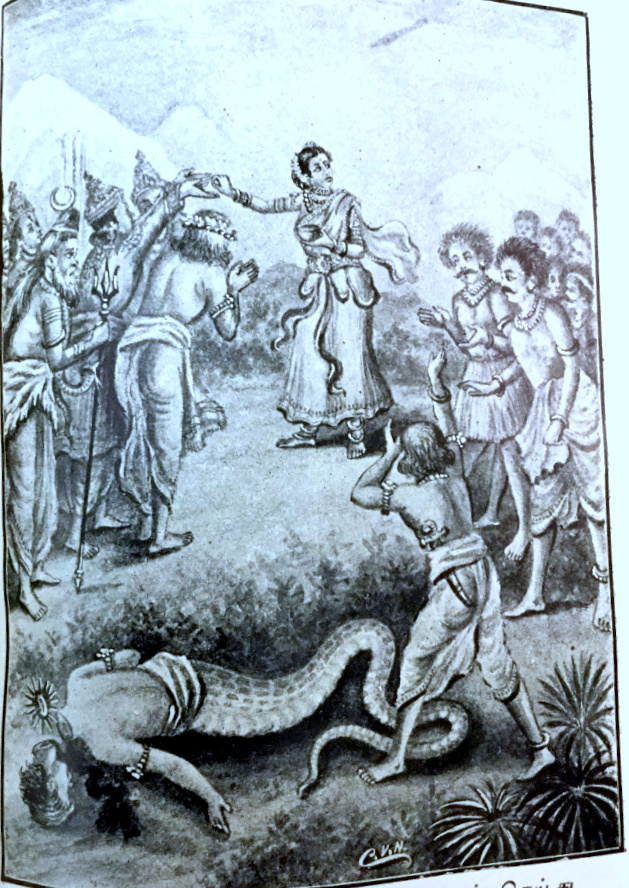
Lord Vishnu took the form of Beauty Mohini and distributed the Amrita (Ambrosia, Elixir) to Devas. When Rahu (snake dragon) tried to steal the Amrita, his head was cut off

- Ambrosia, the food or drink of the gods, which gives longevity or immortality to whoever consumes it. (Greek mythology)
- Amrita, the drink of the gods which grants them immortality. (Hindu mythology)
- Mead of poetry (also Mead of Suttungr), a mythical beverage that whoever "drinks becomes a skald or scholar to recite any information and solve any question. (Norse mythology)
- Soma, it is described as being prepared by extracting juice from the stalks of a certain plant. In both Vedic and Zoroastrian tradition, the name of the drink and the plant are the same, and also personified as a divinity, the three forming a religious or mythological unity. (Zoroastrian mythology)

=== Fruits ===
- Apple of Discord (also Golden Apple of Discord), the goddess Eris inscribed "to the fairest" and tossed in the midst of the festivities at the wedding of Peleus and Thetis. (Greek mythology)
- Forbidden fruit, eaten by Adam and Eve in the Garden of Eden, which they had been commanded not to do by God. (Christian mythology/Jewish mythology)
- Golden apple, an element that appears in various national and ethnic folk legends or fairy tales.
- Peaches of Immortality, consumed by the immortals due to their mystic virtue of conferring longevity on all who eat them. (Chinese mythology)
- Pomegranate (also Fruit of the Dead in Greek mythology), believed to have sprung from the blood of Adonis. It was the rule of the Moirai that anyone who consumed food or drink in the underworld had to spend eternity there. Persephone ate six pomegranate seeds while in the Underworld after becoming Hades' wife, so she had to spend six months in the underworld every year. (Greek mythology)
- Silver apple, magical silver apples can be found on Emhain Abhlach, the Isle of Apple Trees. (Irish mythology)
- Poison apple, featured frequently in folktales or fairy tales.

=== Other ===
- Manna (also Mana), an edible, daily-falling substance that God provided as food for the Israelites to eat every day during their travels in the desert. (Christian mythology/Jewish mythology/Islamic mythology)

== Eggs ==
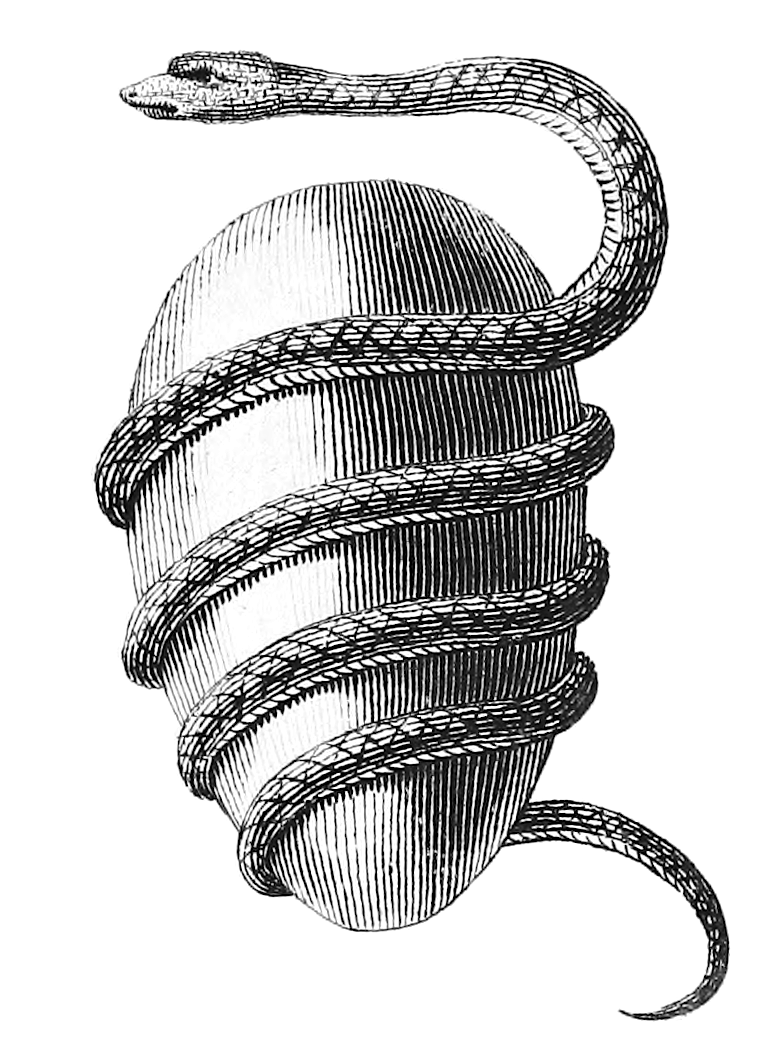
Snake and world egg of the inhabitants of Tyre

- Golden egg, the main object of the folk tale "Kurochka Ryaba". (Russian folklore)
- Myrrh egg, the phoenix would build itself a nest of cinnamon twigs that it then ignited; both nest and bird burned fiercely and would be reduced to ashes, from which a new, young phoenix arose. The new phoenix embalmed the ashes of the old phoenix in an egg made of myrrh and deposited it in the Egyptian city of Heliopolis ("the city of the sun" in Greek). (Greek mythology)
- World egg (also Cosmic Egg or Mundane Egg), found in the creation myths of many cultures and civilizations. The world egg is a beginning of some sort, and the universe or some primordial being comes into existence by "hatching" from the egg, sometimes lain on the primordial waters of the Earth.

== Substances ==
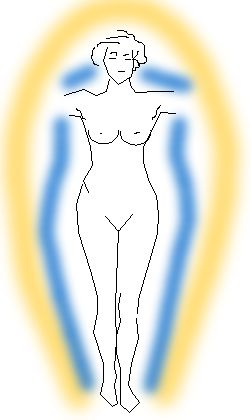
Aura, a field of luminous radiation surrounding a person or object

- Ectoplasm, a supposed physical substance that manifests as a result of energy.
- Aureola, the radiance of luminous cloud which, in paintings of sacred personages, surrounds the whole figure.
- Aura, a field of luminous radiation surrounding a person or object.
- Tears of Ra (also Tears of Re), which are produced when the sun god Ra cries, and become honey bees upon touching the ground. (Egyptian mythology)
- Breath of life, in countless stories from different cultures featured gods breathing life into object that brought them to life.
- Cosmic energy, the translation into English by Sir John Woodroffe of the term Shakti in Hindu religion, based on the Hindu philosophy known as Kashmir Shaivism; a term for spiritual energy; also referred to as prana; thought in Hindu philosophy to be the source of kundalini; identified by some New Age authors with the quantum vacuum zero point energy and as orgone energy it is believed in New Age thought to be a vital force that animates all forms of life.
- Silap Inua (also Silla), similar to mana or ether, the primary component of everything that exists; it is also the breath of life and the method of locomotion for any movement or change. Silla was believed to control everything that goes on in one's life. (Inuit mythology)
- Hellfire, the fires from the lake of fire located in Hell. (Christian mythology)
- Odic force (also Od, Odyle, Önd, Odes, Odylic, Odyllic, Odems), the name given in the mid-19th century to a hypothetical vital energy or life force by Baron Carl von Reichenbach.
- Nebu, the ancient Egyptians believed that gold was an indestructible and heavenly metal. The sun god, Ra, was often referred to as a mountain of gold. (Egyptian mythology)
- Xirang (also Hsi-jang, Swelling Earth, Self-renewing soil, Breathing earth, and Living earth), a magical substance in Chinese mythology that had a self-expanding ability to continuously grow – which made it particularly effective for use by Gun and Yu the Great in fighting the Great Flood. (Chinese mythology)
- Alien metal, the rancher William Brazel found mysterious paper-like metals across his sheep pasture. Believe to have been the remains of an extraterrestrial flying saucer crash near Roswell, New Mexico. The event would later be known as the Roswell UFO incident. (Ufology)
- Solomon's shamir, a substance that had the power to cut through or disintegrate stone, iron and diamond. King Solomon is said to have used it in the building of the First Temple in Jerusalem in the place of cutting tools. (Jewish mythology)

=== Substances from Greek mythology ===
- Orichalcum, a metal that was considered second only to gold in value, and was mined in Atlantis in ancient times.
- Panacea, a remedy that would cure all diseases and prolong life indefinitely.
- Water of Lethe, which flows through the river Lethe, and causes those who drink it to experience forgetfulness.
- Aether, the pure essence that the gods breathed, filling the space where they lived, analogous to the air breathed by mortals.
- Miasma, "a contagious power... that has an independent life of its own. Until purged by the sacrificial death of the wrongdoer, society would be chronically infected by catastrophe".
- Kykeon, ancient Greek drink of various descriptions used at the climax of the Eleusinian Mysteries.
- Pneuma, a supernatural substance that is present in all souls and sustains life in all breathing living creatures. Thought of as giving cosmic energy through breath. One main components of the parts of the soul in ancient Greek medicine.

=== Substances from Norse mythology ===
- Atter, a liquid substance that is the origin of all living things, and is produced by Jörmungandr and other serpents.
- Surtalogi (Surtr's fire), the fire with which the giant Surtr will burn the world with fire, thus destroying it.
- Yggdrasil dew, dew that falls from the ash tree Yggdrasil. When Líf and Lífþrasir seek refuge within Yggdrasil, they find that they can survive there by drinking the dew of Yggdrasil.

=== Substances from Medieval legend and European folklore ===
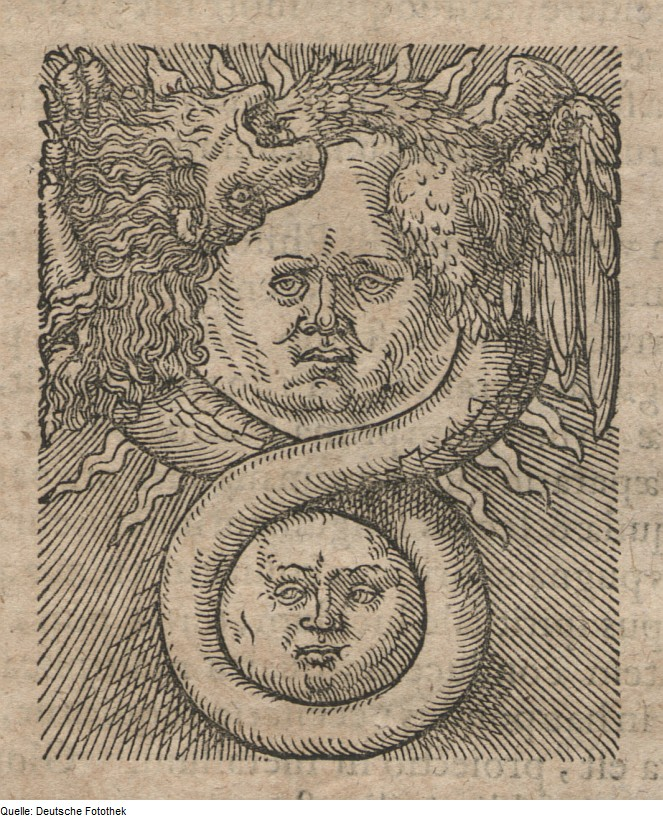
Azoth, a universal medicine or universal solvent sought in alchemy. (Medieval legend)

- Adamant (also Adamantine), a hard substance, whether composed of diamond, some other gemstone, or some type of metal.
- Alkahest, a hypothetical universal solvent which can dissolve every other substance, including gold. It was much sought after by alchemists for what they thought would be its invaluable medicinal qualities. (Medieval legend)
- Azoth, a universal medicine or universal solvent sought in alchemy. (Medieval legend)
- Cold iron, is historically believed to repel, contain, or harm ghosts, fairies, witches, and/or other malevolent supernatural creatures. (European folklore)
- Elixir of life, a mythical potion that, when drunk from a certain cup at a certain time, supposedly grants the drinker eternal life and/or eternal youth. (Medieval legend)
- Fairy dust, fairy ring are circles of mushrooms that seem to pop-up over night in yards. It is said to grow from the magic dust left behind by faeries as they danced and celebrated during the night, before returning to their hidden land. (English folklore)
- Four Thieves Vinegar, a concoction of vinegar infused with herbs, spices or garlic that was believed to protect the user from the plague (disease). (European folklore)
- Holy water, believed to ward off or act as a weapon against mythical evil creatures, such as vampires. In eastern Europe, one might sprinkle holy water onto the corpse of a suspected vampire to destroy it or render it inert. (European folklore)
- Love potion, Tristan goes to Ireland to bring back Isolde the fair for his uncle King Mark to marry. Along the way, they ingest a love potion which causes the pair to fall madly in love. (Arthurian legend)
- Prima materia (also Materia Prima or First Matter), is the ubiquitous starting material required for the alchemical magnum opus and the creation of the philosopher's stone. It is the primitive formless base of all matter similar to chaos, the quintessence, or aether. (Medieval legend)
- Sandman's sand, which the Sandman uses to put people to sleep and bring good dreams by sprinkling it into their eyes while they sleep. (European folklore)
- Yliaster, is the formless base of all matter which is the raw material for the alchemical Great Work. (Medieval legend)
- Unspoken Water, water believed to have healing properties when collected "from under a bridge, over which the living pass and the dead are carried, brought in the dawn or twilight to the house of a sick person, without the bearer's speaking, either in going or returning". (Scottish folklore)
- Water of life, water from the Fountain of Youth that supposedly restores the youth of anyone who drinks or bathes in its waters. (Medieval legend)
- Sleeping potion, the troll princess who lives in a castle east of the sun and west of the moon gives the prince a sleeping drink, so that the youngest daughter cannot wake him. (Scandinavian folklore)

=== Substances from Mesoamérican mythology ===
- Teonanácatl, in Nahuatl literally "god mushroom"—compound of the words teo(tl) (god) and nanácatl (mushroom).

=== Substances from Asian mythology ===
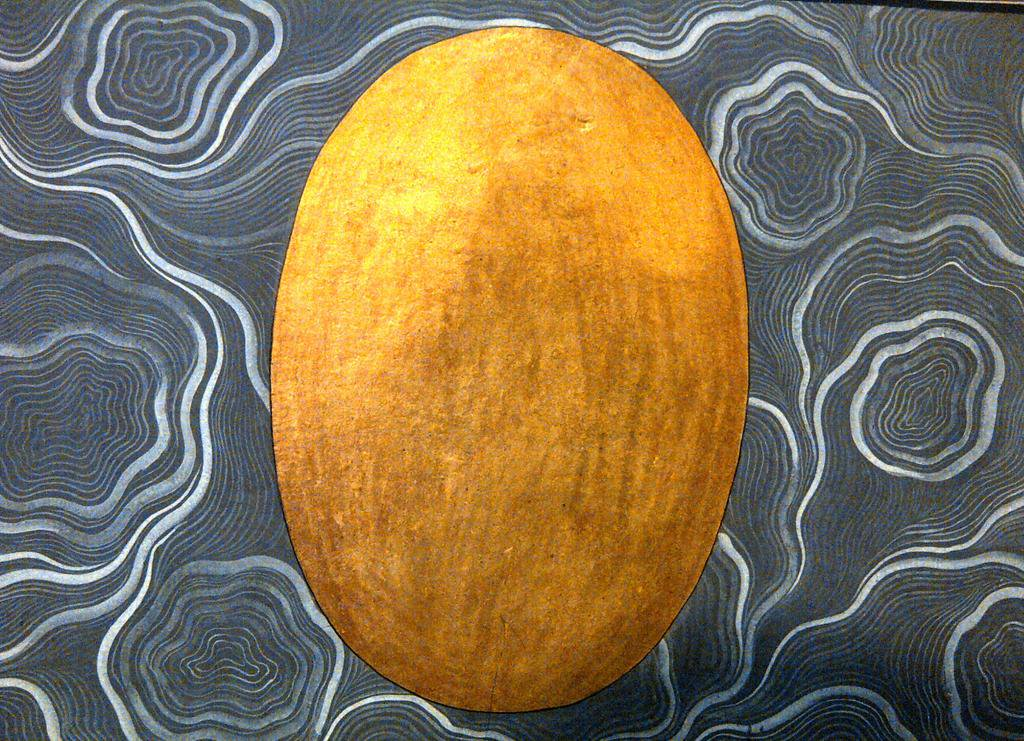
Golden cosmic egg Hiranyagarbha by Manaku

- Hihīrokane, described in the apocryphal Takenouchi Document, an alleged ancient writing in a lost script which details Japan's early history, Hihīrokane was used in the time of Emperor Jimmu, Japan's first emperor. The Kusanagi-no-tsurugi and the other Imperial Regalia of Japan are supposedly made from it. Its weight is lighter than gold, but harder than diamond. It was even said to be able to bring water to a boil without heat, violating the Law of Conservation of Energy. (Japanese mythology)
- Hiranyagarbha, the source of the creation of the universe or the manifested cosmos. (Hindu mythology)
- Halahala, a poison created from the sea when the gods and demons churned it to obtain Amrita, the nectar of immortality. (Hindu mythology)
- Prana, is all cosmic energy, permeating the Universe on all levels. Prana is often referred to as the "life force" or "life energy". It also includes energies present in inanimate objects. (Hindu mythology)
- Five Flavored Tea of Forgetfulness, a brew created by Meng Po that is given to each soul to drink before they leave Diyu. The brew induces instant and permanent amnesia, and all memory of other lives is lost. (Chinese mythology)
- Qi (also Chi or Ki), an active principle forming part of any living thing. Qi literally translates as "breath", "air", or "gas", and figuratively as "material energy", "life force", or "energy flow". Qi is the central underlying principle in traditional Chinese medicine and martial arts. (Chinese mythology)
- Chakra, an energy point or node in the subtle body. Chakras are believed to be part of the subtle body, not the physical body, and as such, are the meeting points of the subtle (non-physical) energy channels called Nadi. (Hinduism/Jainism/Buddhism)
- Yin and yang, a concept of dualism, describing how seemingly opposite or contrary forces may actually be complementary, interconnected, and interdependent in the natural world, and how they may give rise to each other as they interrelate to one another. (Chinese mythology)

== Musical instruments ==
=== Conchs ===
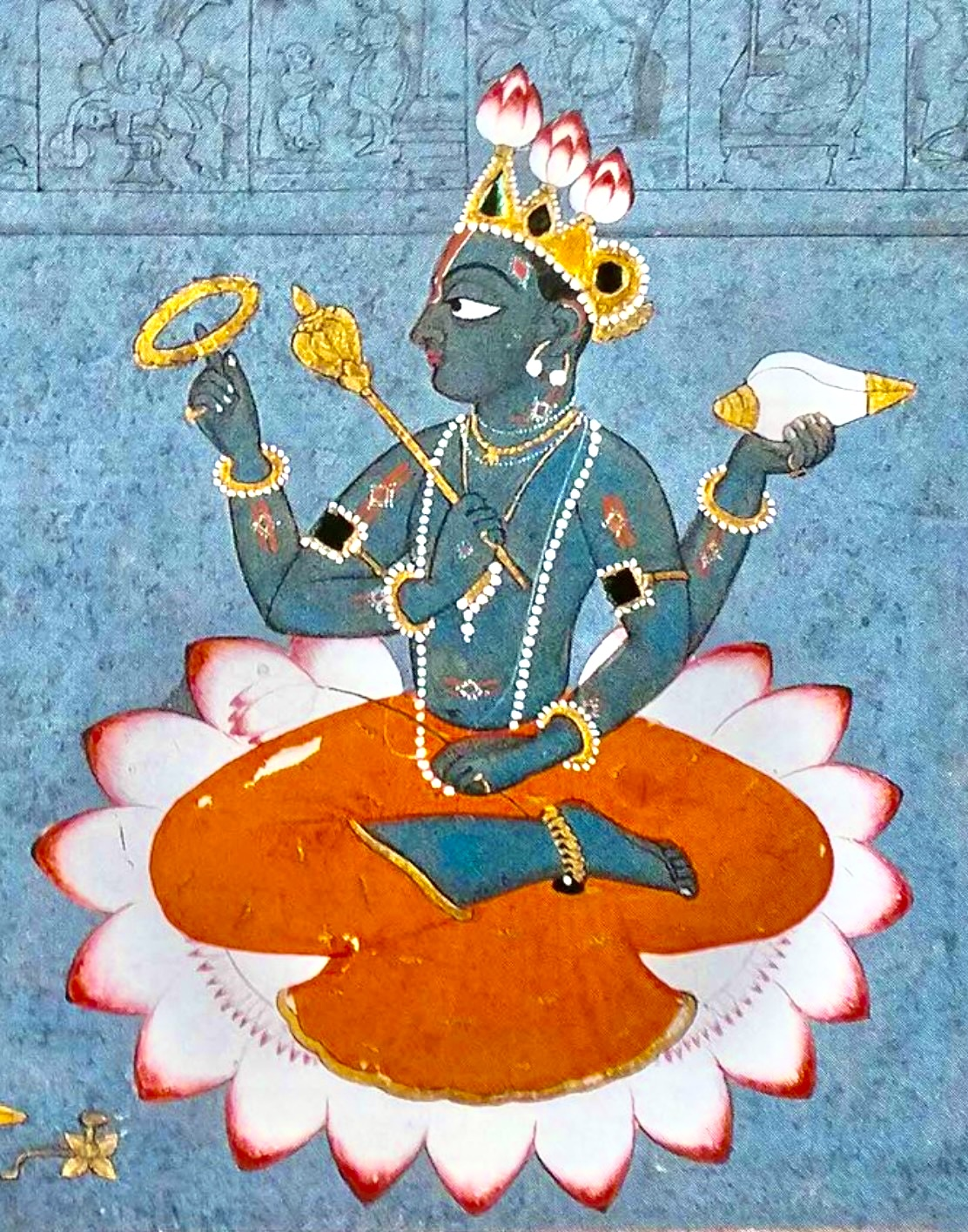
Vishnu with his Panchajanya

- Nandi Vardhanam, the conch shell of Satyaki. (Hindu mythology)
- Panchajanya, a Shankha conch shell of the Hindu god Vishnu. As per Valmiki Ramyana, Purushottama (Vishnu) killed a Danava named Panchajana on a mountain named Chakravan constructed by Vishwakarma and took away conch shell known as Panchajanya from him. (Hindu mythology)
- Shankha, a conch shell and sacred emblem of the Hindu preserver god Vishnu. (Hindu mythology)
- Triton's conch shell, a twisted conch shell on which Triton blew like a trumpet to calm or raise the waves. (Greek mythology)

=== Drums ===
- Drake's Drum, a snare drum that Sir Francis Drake took with him when he circumnavigated the world. Shortly before he died he ordered the drum to be taken to Buckland Abbey and vowed that if England was ever in danger and someone was to beat the drum he would return to defend the country. According to legend it can be heard to beat at times when England is at war or significant national events take place. (English folklore)
- Cultrun, a Mapuche drum that the Machi's use for healing. (Chilean mythology)

=== Flutes ===
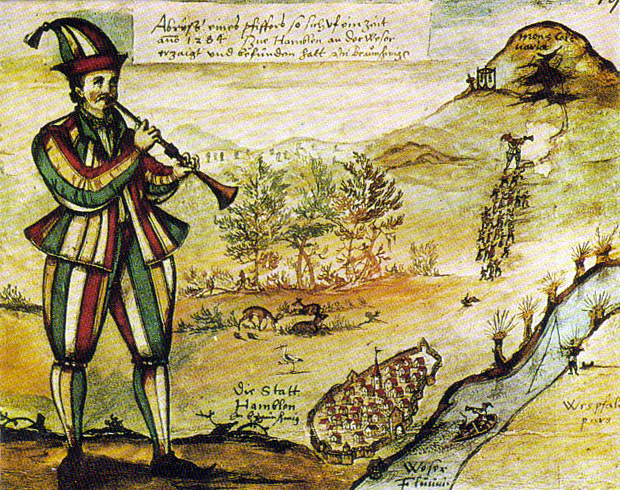
Pied piper

- Pan's flute, reed pipes or pan flute that is played by the god of the wild, Pan. (Greek mythology)
- Pied Piper's magic pipe, which the Pied Piper used to lure the rats, and later children, out of Hamelin. (German folklore)

=== Harps ===
- Bragi's harp, a magical golden harp given to Bragi by the dwarfs when he was born. (Norse mythology)
- David's harp (also Kinnor David), a harp hung above King David's bed, and precisely at midnight a north wind arrived and blew on the harp and it would play by itself. (Jewish mythology)
- Kantele, the mage Väinämöinen makes the first kantele from the jawbone of a giant pike and a few hairs from Hiisi's stallion. The music it makes draws all the forest creatures near to wonder at its beauty. (Finnish mythology)
- Uaithne (also Dur da Blá, The Oak of Two Blossoms, and Coir Cethar Chuin), the harp which belongs to The Dagda. After the Second Battle of Mag Tuired the Fomorians had taken The Dagda's harp with them. The Dagda found it in a feasting-house wherein Bres and his father Elathan were also. The Dagda had bound the music so that it would not sound until he would call to it. After he called to it, it sprang from the wall, came to the Dagda and killed nine men on its way. (Irish mythology)
- Binnorie's harp (also Minnorie's harp), when the murdered girl's body floats ashore, a musician made a musical instrument out of it, a harp, with a frame of bone and the girl's "long yellow hair" for strings. The instrument then plays itself and sings about the murder. (Northumbrian folklore)
- Talyn Arthur (Arthur's Harp), the name of the constellation of Lyra in Wales. (Welsh mythology)
- Canola's harp (Cana's Harp), Canola realised the wind had created the music by blowing through partially rotted sinew still attached to a whale skeleton. She designed the harp based on this. (Irish mythology)

=== Horns ===
- Horn of Gabriel, a horn blown by the Archangel Gabriel to announce Judgement Day. (Christian mythology)
- Olifant (also Olivant), the horn of Roland, paladin of Charlemagne in the Song of Roland. Roland blows the horn, but the force required bursts his temple, resulting in death. His olifant was supposedly a unicorn's horn. (Matter of France)
- Gjallarhorn, a mystical horn blown at the onset of Ragnarök associated with the god Heimdallr and the wise being Mímir. (Norse mythology)

=== Lyres ===
- Amphion's lyre, a gift to Amphion from his lover Hermes that allowed Amphion to telekinetically move stones to build the walls of Thebes. (Greek mythology)
- Apollo's lyre, Hermes created the lyre for him from the entrails of one of Apollo's cows. Apollo was furious at Hermes, but after hearing the sound of the lyre, his anger faded. The instrument became a common attribute of Apollo. (Greek mythology)
- Orpheus' lyre, a golden lyre given to him by Apollo. It is said that Orpheus' music and singing could charm the birds, fish and wild beasts, coax the trees and rocks into dance, and divert the course of rivers. It is state that his lyre was placed in the sky by Zeus. (Greek mythology)

=== Rattles ===
- Sistrum, one of the most sacred musical instruments in ancient Egypt, which was believed to hold powerful magical properties. It was also shaken to avert the flooding of the Nile and to frighten away Set. (Egyptian mythology)

=== Trumpets ===
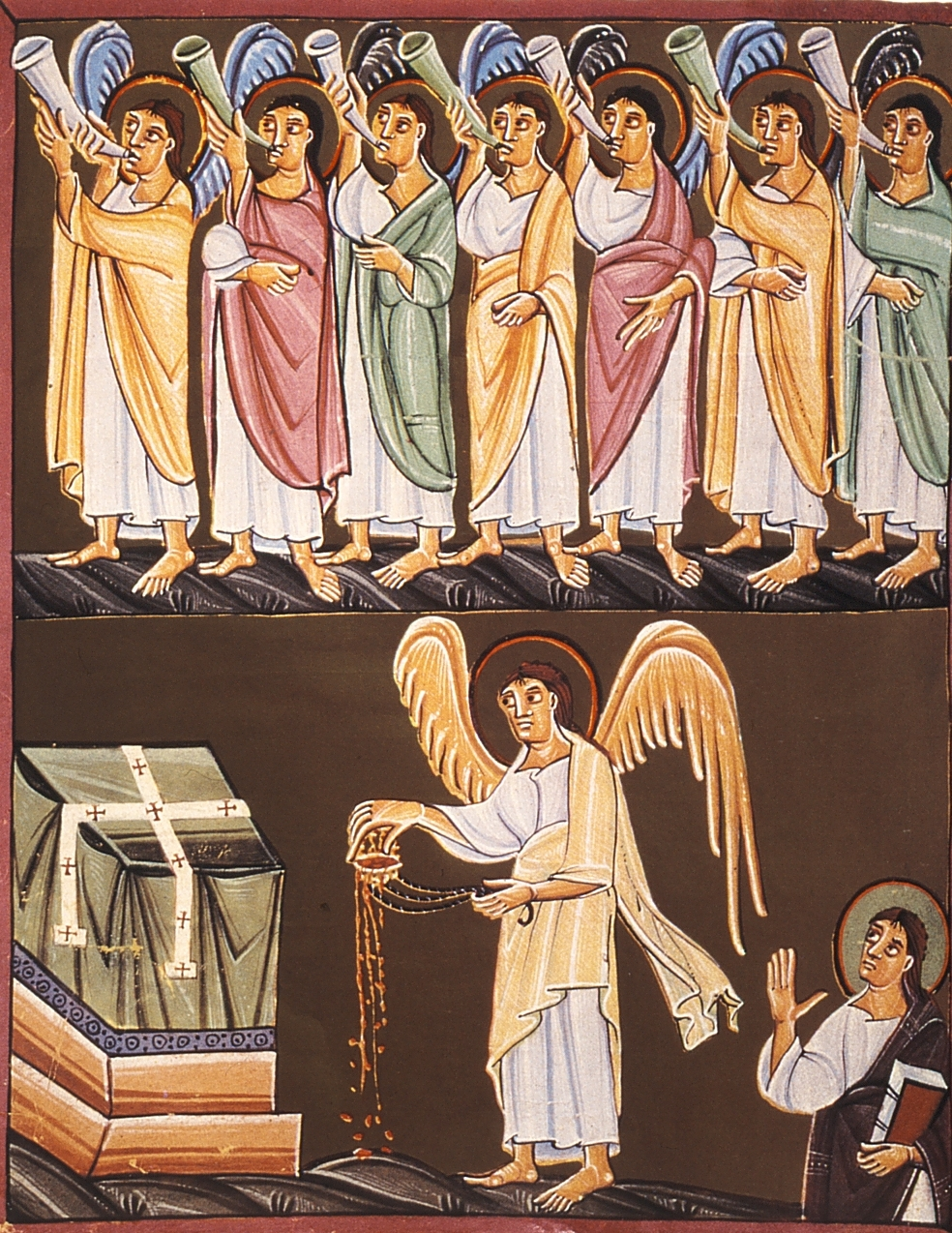
seven angels with seven trumpets

- Seven trumpets, seven angels with seven trumpets are sounded and the events that follow are described in detail from Revelation Chapters 8 to 11. (Christian mythology)
- seven trumpets of Zahhak, Seven golden trumpets, each of which was connected to one of the seven realms of the world, and by blowing each of those trumpets, Zahhak would send down deadly disasters such as plagues, earthquakes, and rain of fire on that land. (Persian mythology)
- Pheme's trumpet, Pheme is the goddess of gossip and she was said to have pried into the affairs of mortals and gods. She then repeated what she had learned by sounding her trumpet to spread the gossip to people near and far. (Greek mythology)
- Joshua's shofars (also Joshua's trumpets), the walls of Jericho fell after Joshua's Israelite army marched around the city blowing their trumpets during the Battle of Jericho. (Jewish mythology)

== Springs ==
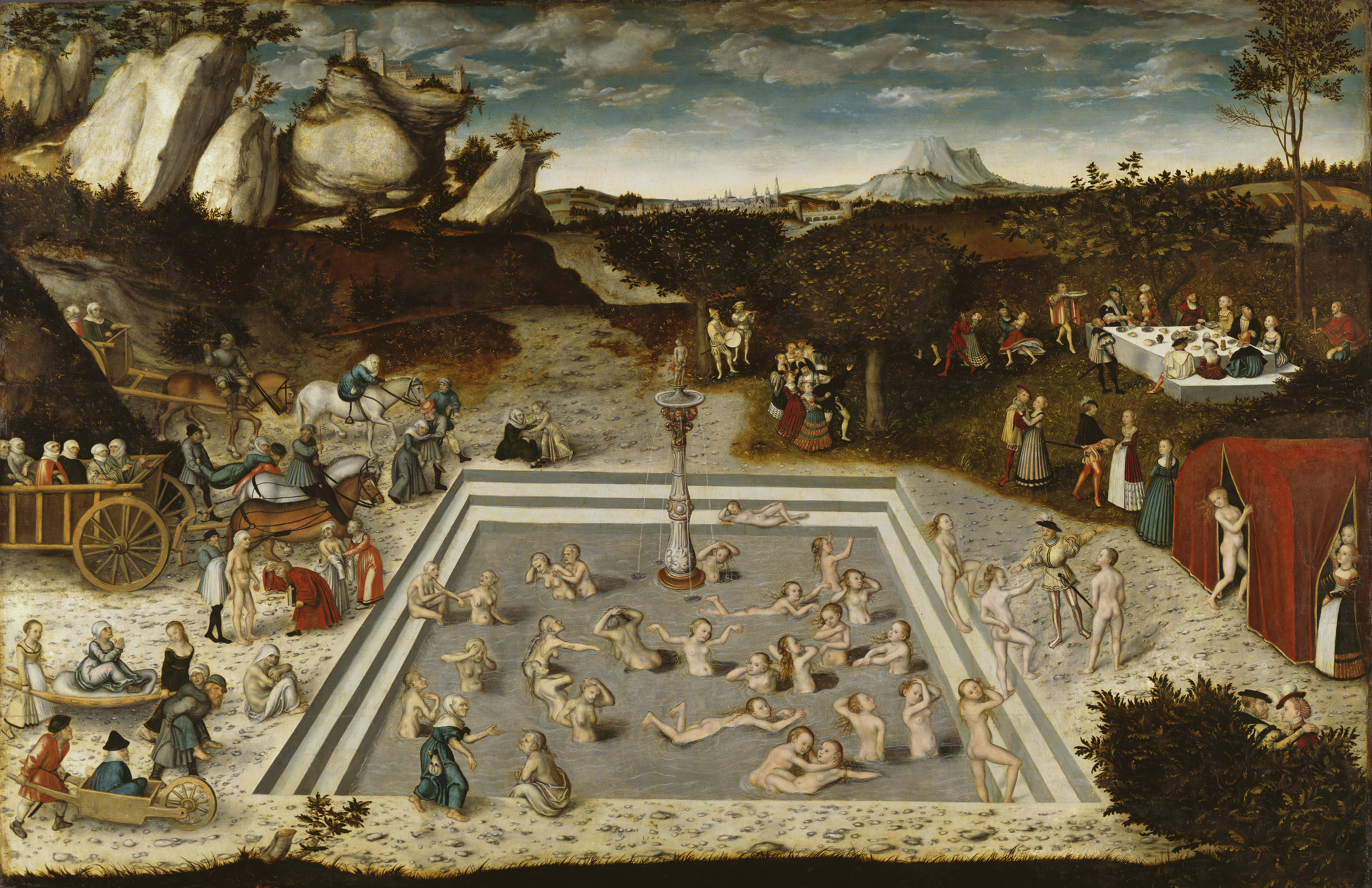
Fountain of Youth

- Fountain of Youth, a spring that supposedly restores the youth of anyone who drinks or bathes in its waters. (Medieval legend)
- Mímisbrunnr (Mímir's well), a well associated with the being Mímir, located beneath Yggdrasil. The water of the well contains much wisdom, and that Odin's eye sacrifice to the well was in exchange for a drink from it. (Norse mythology)
- Hvergelmir (Bubbling Boiling Spring), a major spring. (Norse mythology)
- Urðarbrunnr (also Well of Wyrd), a well that lies beneath Yggdrasil, and is associated with a trio of norns (Urðr, Verðandi, and Skuld). (Norse mythology)
- Holy well (also Sacred Spring), a spring revered either in a Pagan or Christian context, often both. Holy wells were frequently pagan sacred sites that later became Christianized. The term holy well is commonly employed to refer to any water source of limited size (i.e. not a lake or river, but including pools and natural springs and seeps), which has some significance in the folklore of the area where it is located, whether in the form of a particular name, an associated legend, the attribution of healing qualities to the water through the numinous presence of its guardian spirit or Christian saint.
- Wishing well, wells where it was thought that any spoken wish would be granted. The idea that a wish would be granted came from the idea that water housed deities or had been placed there as a gift from the gods, since water was a source of life and often a scarce commodity. (European folklore)
- Lake of fire, a lake of fire where the wicked dead are thrown into. (Egyptian/Christian)
- Connla's Well (also Well of Coelrind, Well of Nechtan or Well of Segais), one of a number of otherworldly wells that are variously depicted as "The Well of Wisdom", "The Well of Knowledge" and the source of some of the rivers of Ireland. Much like the Well of Nechtan (and some sources equate the two), the well is the home to the salmon of wisdom, and surrounded with hazel trees, which also signify knowledge and wisdom. (Irish mythology)

== Furniture ==
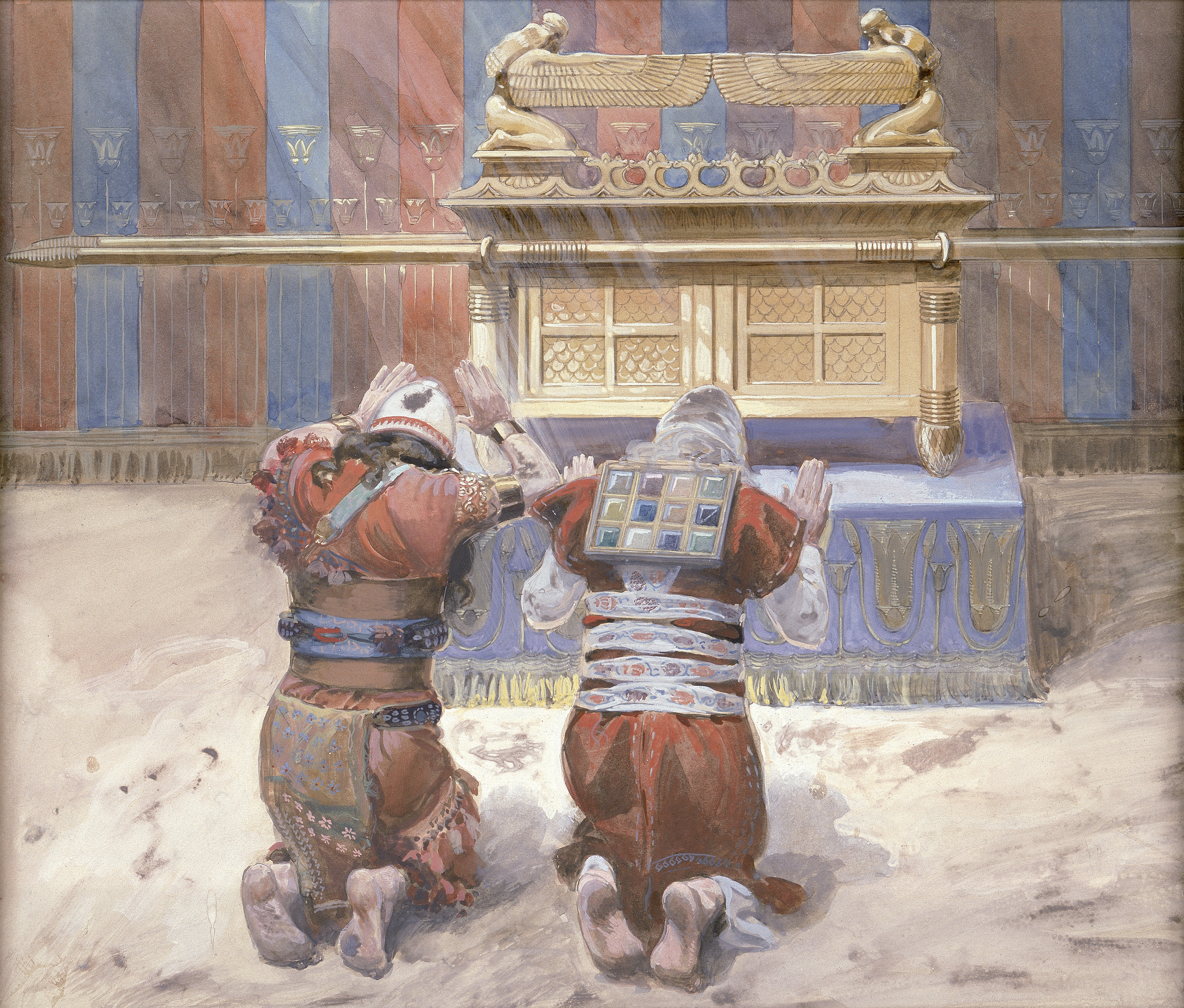
Tissot Moses and Joshua in the Tabernacle

- Hlidskjalf, Odin's all-seeing throne in his palace Valaskjálf. (Norse mythology)
- Round Table, King Arthur's famed table, around which he and his Knights congregate. As its name suggests, it has no head, implying that everyone who sits there has equal status. (Arthurian legend)
- Siege Perilous (The Perilous Seat), a vacant seat at the Round Table reserved by Merlin for the knight who would one day be successful in the quest for the Holy Grail. (Arthurian legend)
- Golden Throne, Hephaestus gained revenge against Hera for rejecting him by making her a magical golden throne which when she sat on it, did not allow her to stand up. (Greek mythology)
- Ara (Altar), identified as the altar where the gods first made offerings and formed an alliance before defeating the Titans. (Greek mythology)
- Ark of the Covenant (also Ark of the Testimony), a wooden chest clad with gold containing the stone tablets of the Ten Commandments as well as Aaron's rod and a pot of manna. (Jewish mythology)
- Busby's stoop chair (also Dead Man's Chair), a haunted oak chair that was cursed by the murderer Thomas Busby before his execution by hanging in North Yorkshire, United Kingdom. (English folklore)
- Throne of God (also Araboth and al-'Arsh), the reigning centre of God of the Abrahamic religions: primarily Judaism, Christianity, and Islam. The throne is said by various holy books to reside beyond the Seventh Heaven.
- Khnum's potter's wheel, he was thought to be the creator of the bodies of human children, which he made at a potter's wheel, from clay, and placed in their mothers' wombs. (Egyptian mythology)
- The bed of Procrustes, An iron bed used by Procrustes in which he would place his victims inside of. (Greek mythology)
- Throne of Gems, The mythical Iranian King Jamshid saved mankind from a winter destined to kill every living creature. He constructed a throne made of precious gems. He sat on the throne, demons lifted him into the heavens where he shone like the Sun and winter was defeated. (Iranian mythology)

== Ropes and chains ==
- Thread of Ariadne, the magical ball of thread given to Theseus by Ariadne to help him navigate the Labyrinth. (Greek Mythology)
- Lædingr, a chain forged by Thor to bind and were broken by Fenrir. (Norse Mythology)
- Dromi, another chain to bind Fenrir. (Norse Mythology)
- Gleipnir, the fetter that successfully bound the wolf Fenrir. It was light and thin as silk but strong as creation itself and made from six impossible ingredients. (Norse mythology)
- Red string of fate, an East Asian belief originating from Chinese legend. According to this myth, the gods tie an invisible red cord around the ankles of those that are destined to meet one another in a certain situation or help each other in a certain way. Often, in Japanese culture, it is thought to be tied around the little finger. According to Chinese legend, the deity in charge of "the red thread" is believed to be Yuè Xià Lǎorén (月下老人), often abbreviated to Yuè Lǎo (月老), the old lunar matchmaker god, who is in charge of marriages. (Chinese mythology)
- Prometheus's chains, unbreakable shackles of adamantine that were made by Hephaestus and broken by Heracles. (Greek mythology)
- Gold chain of Ọbatala, a chain used by the deity Ọbatala to descend from the heavens so he could create the Earth. (Yoruba religion)

== Body parts ==
=== Heads ===
- Brazen head (also brass head or bronze head), a legendary automaton reputed to be able to answer any question. (Medieval legend)
- Mímir's head, the severed head of Mimir, which was magically preserved by Odin so it could continue to provide knowledge and counsel as his advisor. (Norse mythology)
- Medusa's head, the severed head of Medusa, which was given to Athena by Perseus to place on her Aegis. (Greek mythology)
- Ymir's skull, Norðri, Suðri, Austri and Vestri each support one of the four cardinal points. Together, they uphold the heavenly dome, created from the skull of the jötunn Ymir. (Norse mythology)
- Bendigeidfran's head, the severed head of Brân the Blessed, which was buried in London facing France to magically ward off invasion. (Welsh mythology)

=== Eyes ===
- Odin's eye, Odin sacrifice his eye to Mímir for the price of wisdom, a drink from the Mímisbrunnr. (Norse mythology)
- Eye of Horus, Set and Horus were fighting for the throne after Osiris's death, Set gouged out Horus's left eye. The majority of the eye was restored by Thoth. When Horus's eye was recovered, he offered it to his father, Osiris, in hopes of restoring his life. (Egyptian mythology)
- Graeae's eye, three sisters who shared one eye among themselves. (Greek mythology)
- Eye of Ra, Ra was becoming old and weak and the people no longer respected him or his rule. Ra did not react well to this and decided to punish mankind by sending his Eye to find them. (Egyptian mythology)
- Balor's eye, a large eye that wreaks destruction when opened. The Cath Maige Tuired calls it a "destructive" and "poisonous" eye that no army can withstand. (Irish mythology)
- Eye of Providence, a symbol showing an eye often surrounded by rays of light or a glory and usually enclosed by a triangle. It represents the eye of God watching over mankind or divine providence.
- Þjazi's eyes, Odin took Þjazi's eyes and placed them in the night sky as stars. (Norse mythology)
- Shiva's third eye, it could burn even gods to ashes. (Hindu mythology)

=== Limbs ===
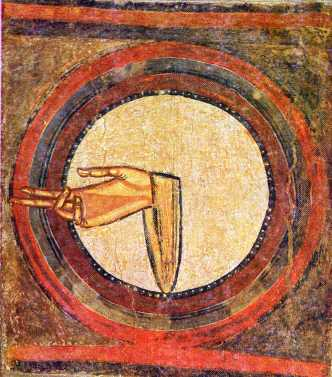
Hand of God

- Hand of Glory, a severed pickled hand of a man who was hanged alive. Said to have the power to unlock any door and, if a candle was placed within made from some body part of the same person, would freeze in place anyone who it was given to. (European folklore)
- Týr's hand, which was bitten off by Fenrir. (Norse mythology)
- Hand of God (also Manus Dei and Dextera domini/dei), ", a motif in Jewish and Christian art, especially of the Late Antique and early medieval periods, when depiction of Jehovah or God the Father as a full human figure was considered unacceptable. The hand, sometimes including a portion of an arm, or ending about the wrist, is used to indicate the intervention in or approval of affairs on Earth by God, and sometimes as a subject in itself. (Christian mythology/Jewish mythology)
- Aurvandils-tá (Aurvandill's toe), the god Thor tosses Aurvandill's toe which had frozen into the sky to form a star called Aurvandils-tá. (Norse mythology)

=== Hair, feathers and skin ===
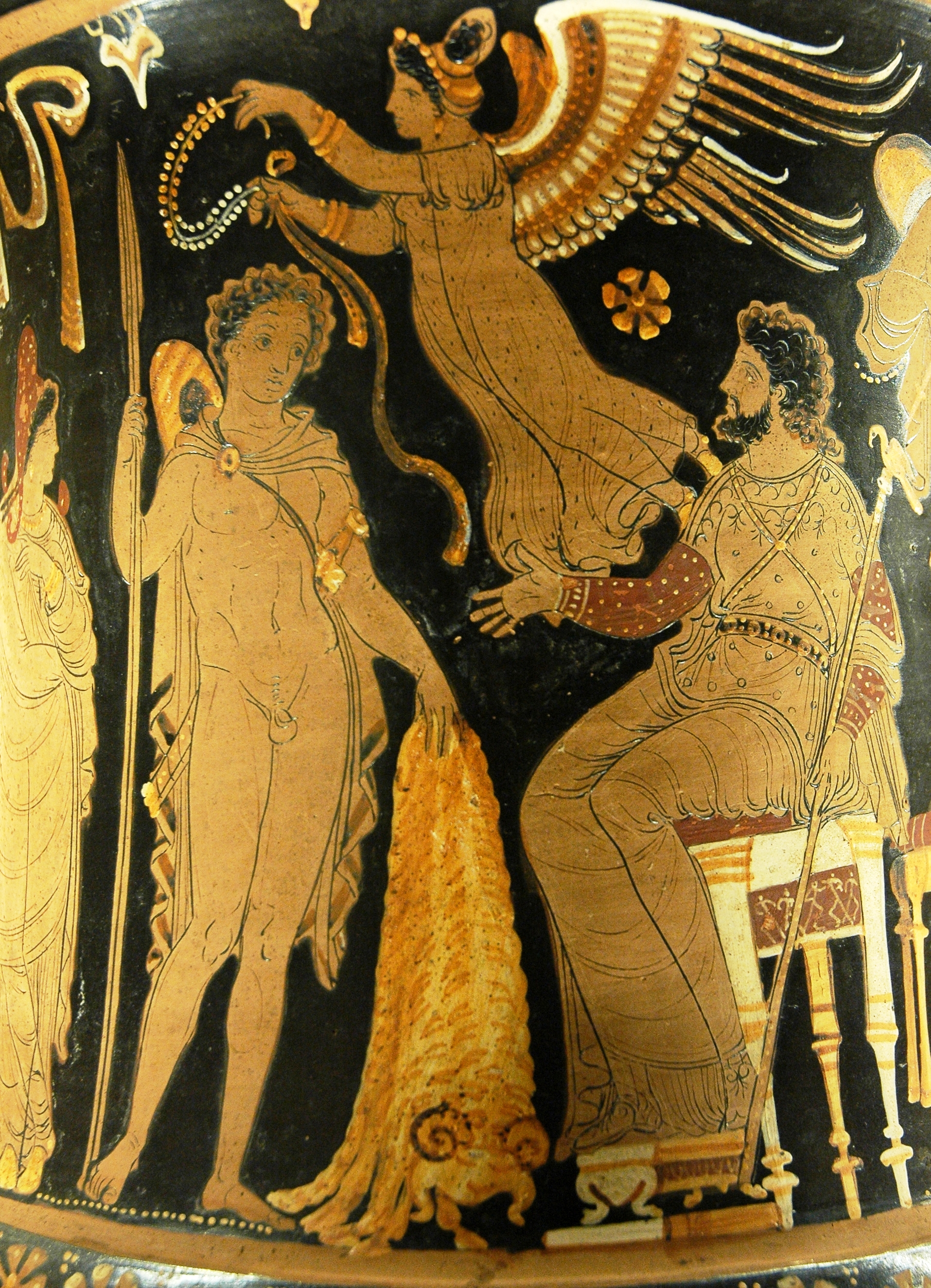
Jason returns with Golden fleece

- Golden Fleece, sought by Jason and the Argonauts. The fleece of the golden winged ram, which was sought by Jason and the Argonauts. (Greek mythology)
- Firebird's plumage, the feathers of a Firebird that glows brightly emitting red, orange, and yellow light, like a bonfire that is just past the turbulent flame. The feathers do not cease glowing if removed, and one feather can light a large room if not concealed. (Slavic mythology)
- Feathers of Simurgh, the legendary Simurgh gave three of her feathers to Zal, the Persian hero and also father of Rostam, so that whenever he needed the guidance or help of Simurgh, he could burn one of the feathers and Simurgh came to his aid. (Persian mythology)
- Feather of Ma'at (also Feather of Truth), her ostrich feather was the measure that determined whether the souls of the departed would reach the fields of Aaru successfully. The hearts of the dead were said to be weighed against her single feather in the Hall of Two Truths. (Egyptian mythology)
- Peacock's feather, the peacock was the patron bird of the Goddess Hera. According to myth, she adorned the tail of a peacock with Argus's eyes on its feathers in his honor, symbolizing all-seeing knowledge and the wisdom of the heavens. (Greek mythology)
- Leviathan's hide, could be turned into everlasting clothing or impenetrable suits of armor. (Jewish mythology)
- Nemean lion's hide, the lion could not be killed with mortal weapons because its golden fur was impervious to attacks. (Greek mythology)
- Selkie's skin, selkies are said to live as seals in the sea but shed their skin to become human on land. If a man steals a female selkie's skin, she is in his power and is forced to become his wife. If she finds her skin she will return to her true home in the sea. (Irish folklore)
- Coma Berenices (Berenice's hair), Berenice II of Egypt dedicated her hair to Aphrodite for her husband's safe return from Syria, and placed it in the temple of the goddess at Zephyrium. The hair had been carried to the heavens and placed among the stars. (Egyptian mythology)
- Ymir's hair, Odin, Vili and Vé used his hair for the trees. (Norse mythology)
- Ymir's eyebrows , Odin, Vili and Vé used his eyebrows to create the middle realm in which humans live, Midgard. (Norse mythology)

=== Blood and flesh ===
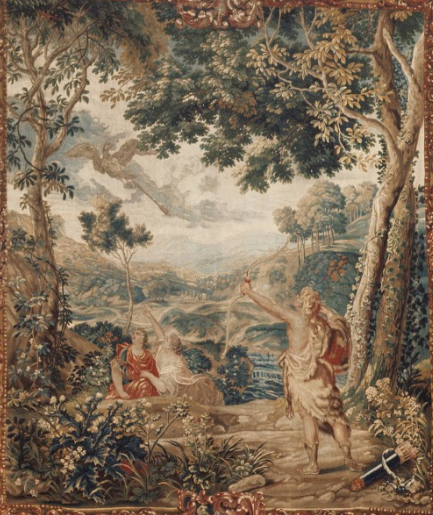
Heracles would use arrows dipped in the Hydra's poisonous blood to kill other foes during his Labours, such as Stymphalian birds and the giant

- Hydra's poisonous blood, Heracles would use arrows dipped in the Hydra's poisonous blood to kill other foes during his Labours, such as Stymphalian birds and the giant Geryon. (Greek mythology)
- Ningyo's flesh, the flesh is pleasant-tasting and anyone who eats it will attain remarkable longevity. (Japanese mythology)
- Fafnir's blood, Sigurd bathed in dragon's blood that conferred him invulnerability. He also drank some of Fafnir's blood and gained the ability to understand the language of the birds. (Norse mythology)
- Blood of Christ, the blood shed by Jesus Christ on the Cross. (Christian mythology)
- Ichor, the ethereal golden fluid that is the blood of the gods. (Greek mythology)
- Ymir's flesh, Odin, Vili and Vé fashioned the Earth from his flesh. (Norse mythology)
- Ymir's blood, Odin, Vili and Vé used his blood to form the ocean. (Norse mythology)

=== Bones and horns ===
- Unicorn horn (also Alicorn), the detached horn of a unicorn was thought to have many healing properties and antidote's virtues were attributed to the unicorn's horn. (European folklore)
- Dragon's teeth, in the legends of the Phoenician prince Cadmus and in Jason's quest for the Golden Fleece. In each case, the dragons are real and breathe fire. Their teeth, once planted, would grow into fully armed warriors. (Greek mythology)
- Camahueto's horn, the most valuable part of a Camahueto is their single horn, machis will use the horn for curing many kinds of illnesses. (Chilote mythology)
- Ymir's bones, Odin, Vili and Vé used his bones the make the hills. (Norse mythology)

=== Organs ===
- Valknut (also Hrungnir's Heart), Hrungnir's head, heart, and shield were made of stone. His heart had a peculiar shape, it was triangular due to which both the Valknut and the Triquetra have been called Hrungnir's heart. (Norse mythology)
- Fafnir's heart, which was roasted and consumed by Sigurd, giving him the gift of prophecy. (Norse mythology)
- Ymir's brain, which was used by Odin, Vili and Vé to make the clouds. (Norse mythology)
- Uranus's genitals, which fell on the ocean and formed Aphrodite, a nymph who later on became the goddess of beauty after being introduced to at Olympus (Greek mythology)

== Containers ==
- Basket of Existence, a raffia basket containing the divine ingredients that were to be used by Obatala to create the universe. It was stolen by his fellow orisha Oduduwa before he could do so. (Yoruba mythology)
- Óðrerir, refers either to one of the vessels that contain the mead of poetry (along with Boðn and Són) or to the mead itself. (Norse mythology)
- Pot of Gold, which is used by leprechauns to store away all their coins at the end of the rainbow. (Irish mythology)
- Hamper of Gwyddno Garanhir, Gwyddno Garanhir possessed a hamper which would multiply food: if one was to put food for one man in the basket and open it again, the food was found to be increased a hundredfold. (Welsh mythology)
- Horn of Brân Galed, the Horn of Brân Galed from the North is said to have possessed the magical property of ensuring that "whatever drink might be wished for was found in it". (Welsh mythology)
- Pandora's box (also Pandora's pithos), a large jar given to Pandora which contained all the evils of the world. Pandora opened the jar and all the evils flew out, leaving only Hope inside once she had closed it again. (Greek mythology)
- Excalibur's scabbard, was said to have powers of its own. Injuries from losses of blood, for example, would not kill the bearer. In some telling, wounds received by one wearing the scabbard did not bleed at all. (Arthurian legend)
- Osiris's coffin, a beautifully carved coffin made by Set. Osiris was tricked by Set to enter the chest, and was enclosed inside it by 72 accomplices of Set. Set flung the coffer in the Nile so that it would drift far away. (Egyptian mythology)
- Purple Gold Red Gourd, a powerful magic gourd that sucks anyone who speaks before it inside and melts them down into a bloody stew. (Chinese mythology)
- Trojan Horse, a wooden horse where a select force of men hide inside during the Trojan War, the subterfuge that the Greeks used to enter the city of Troy and win the war. (Greek mythology)
- Ark of bulrushes, a container which carried the infant Moses. (Christian mythology/Jewish mythology)

=== Bags ===
- Bag of Mysteries, the pouch containing the secrets that were supposed to be the reward of the spirit responsible for the creation of the world. It was originally given by Olorun to Obatala, who was mandated by Him to serve that function, but was subsequently stolen by his brother/sister/spouse Oduduwa when he/she usurped his position as creator spirit. This and the simultaneous theft of the Basket of Existence (see above) later led to a war between them. (Yoruba mythology)
- Bag of Wind, Aeolus gave Odysseus a tightly closed leather bag full of the captured winds so he could sail easily home to Ithaca on the gentle West Wind. (Greek mythology)
- Corrbolg, a bag crafted by Manannán mac Lir from the skin of Aoife who had been transformed into a crane at the time of her death. It was later given to Conaire Mór and then eventually to Cumhall mac Trénmhóir and finally Fionn Mac Cumhaill. The crane bag contained a variable amount of items depending on if the tide was high or low. (Irish mythology)
- Qiankun Dai, one of the ten ancient artifacts, the universe bag or cosmos bag is a bag belonging to Maitreya that is able to fit all of heaven and earth inside. (Chinese Mythology)
- Kibisis, the sack in which the mythical hero Perseus carried the severed head of the monster Medusa. (Greek mythology)
- Santa's bag, carries a bag full of presents for children. (Modern folklore)

=== Cups and chalices ===
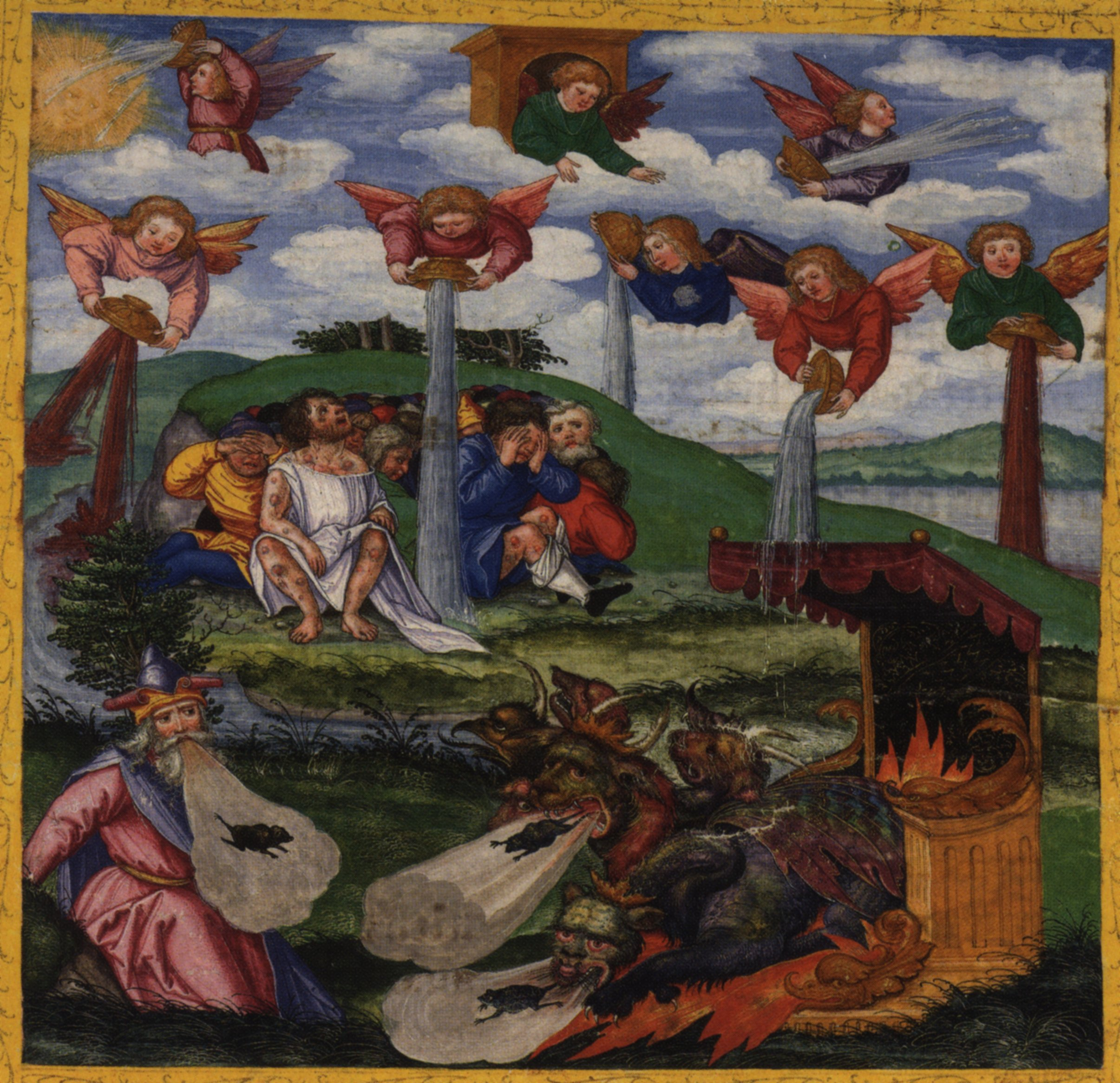
The Giving of the Seven Bowls of Wrath / The First Six Plagues, Revelation 16:1–16. Matthias Gerung, c. 1531

- Cup of Jamshid (Jām-e Jam), a cup of divination that was long possessed by rulers of ancient Persia and was said to be filled with an elixir of immortality. (Persian mythology)
- Nanteos Cup, a medieval wood mazer bowl attributed with the ability to heal those who drink from it. (Christian mythology)
- Holy Grail, a dish, plate, stone, or cup that is part of an important theme of Arthurian literature. (Arthurian legend/Christian mythology)
- Holy Chalice, the vessel which Jesus used at the Last Supper to serve the wine. (Christian mythology)
- Crater (Cup), identified with the cup of the god Apollo. (Greek mythology)
- Seven bowls, seven angels are thus given seven bowls of God's wrath, each consisting of judgements full of the wrath of God. These seven bowls of God's wrath are poured out on the wicked and the followers of the Antichrist after the sounding of the seven trumpets. (Christian mythology)

=== Lamps and lanterns ===
- Lantern of Diogenes, carried by the Cynic philosopher Diogenes of Sinope to aid in his fruitless search for an honest man. (Greek philosophy)
- Magic Lamp, an oil lamp that can be rubbed to summon a genie who grants wishes. (Arabic mythology)

== Sculptures ==
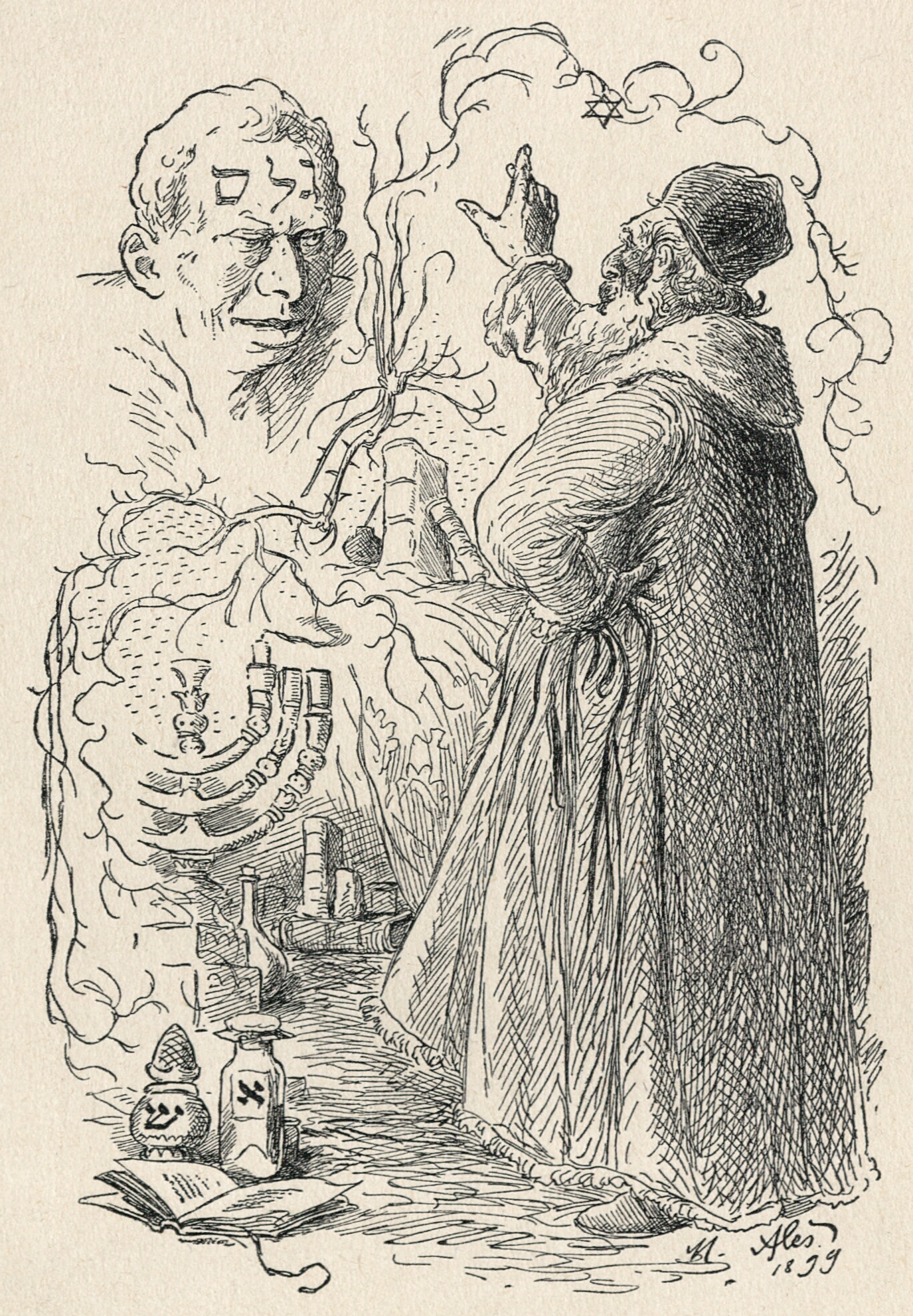
Golem and Loew

- Palladium, a wooden statue that fell from the sky. As long as it stayed in Troy, the city-state could not lose a war. (Greek mythology)
- Ushabti, a funerary figurine used in Ancient Egypt. Ushabtis were placed in tombs among the grave goods and were intended to act as servants or minions for the deceased, should they be called upon to do manual labor in the afterlife. (Egyptian mythology)
- Ikenga, a statue that bestows its owner with super strength. (Igbo mythology)
- Obelisk, a tall, four-sided, narrow tapering monument which ends in a pyramid-like shape or pyramidion at the top. The obelisk symbolized the sun god Ra, and during the brief religious reformation of Akhenaten was said to be a petrified ray of the Aten, the sundisk. It was also thought that the god existed within the structure. (Egyptian mythology)
- Galatea, a statue carved of ivory by Pygmalion of Cyprus, which the goddess Aphrodite brought to life before uniting the couple in marriage. (Greek mythology)
- Golem, an animated anthropomorphic being that is magically created entirely from inanimate matter (specifically clay or mud). The word was used to mean an amorphous, unformed material in Psalms and medieval writing. There are many tales differing on how the golem was brought to life and afterwards controlled. (Jewish folklore)
- Terracotta Army, a collection of terracotta sculptures depicting the armies of Qin Shi Huang, the first Emperor of China. The figures include warriors, chariots and horses whose purpose was to protect the emperor in his afterlife. (Chinese mythology)

== Mirrors ==
- Oshun's mirror, a mirror that the river spirit Oshun keeps upon her person and uses as her symbol as the goddess of beauty. (Yoruba mythology)
- Smoking mirror, the mirror used by the god Tezcatlipoca to see the whole cosmos. (Aztec mythology)
- Yata no Kagami, a mirror representing wisdom that was offered to the goddess of the sun, Amaterasu. (Japanese mythology)
- Archimedes's mirror, used by Archimedes to focus sunlight onto ships attacking Syracuse, causing them to catch fire. (Greek mythology)
- Logun Ede's mirror, given as a gift from his mother, Oshun. (Yoruba mythology)
- Snowwhite's stepmother's mirror, a talking mirror that serves Snow White's stepmother by answering her questions. (German folklore)

== Dispensers ==
- Sampo (also Sammas), a magical artifact constructed by Ilmarinen that brought good fortune to its holder. (Finnish mythology)
- Skatert-Samobranka (Magic Tablecloth), a magic tablecloth is spread on the ground, saying the magic words and food and drink aplenty will appear. When finished eating, rolling up all the dirty plates, cutlery, and crumbs into the tablecloth and they magically disappear. (Russian folklore)
- Halter of Clydno Eiddyn, belonged to Clydno Eiddyn (Cebystr Clydno Eiddin). It was fixed to a staple at the foot of his bed. Whatever horse he might wish for, he would find in the halter. The Halter of Clydno Eiddyn was also called The Handy Halter, for it summons fine horses. (Welsh mythology)
- Akshaya Patra, a wonderful vessel given to Yudishtira by the Lord Surya which provided a never-ending supply of food to the Pandavas every day. (Hindu mythology)
- Crock and Dish of Rhygenydd Ysgolhaig, whatever food might be wished for in them, it would be found on them. It belonged to Rhygenydd the Cleric. (Welsh mythology)
- Cornucopia (also Horn of Plenty), the horn of the goat-nymph Amalthea from which poured an unceasing abundance of nectar, ambrosia, and fruit. (Greek mythology)
- Manna machine, a machine described within the Zohar writings that is similar to chlorella algae processing of today. (Jewish mythology)
- Akshaya Tunir, an inexhaustible quiver of arrows belonging to Arjuna. (Hindu mythology)

== Bridges ==
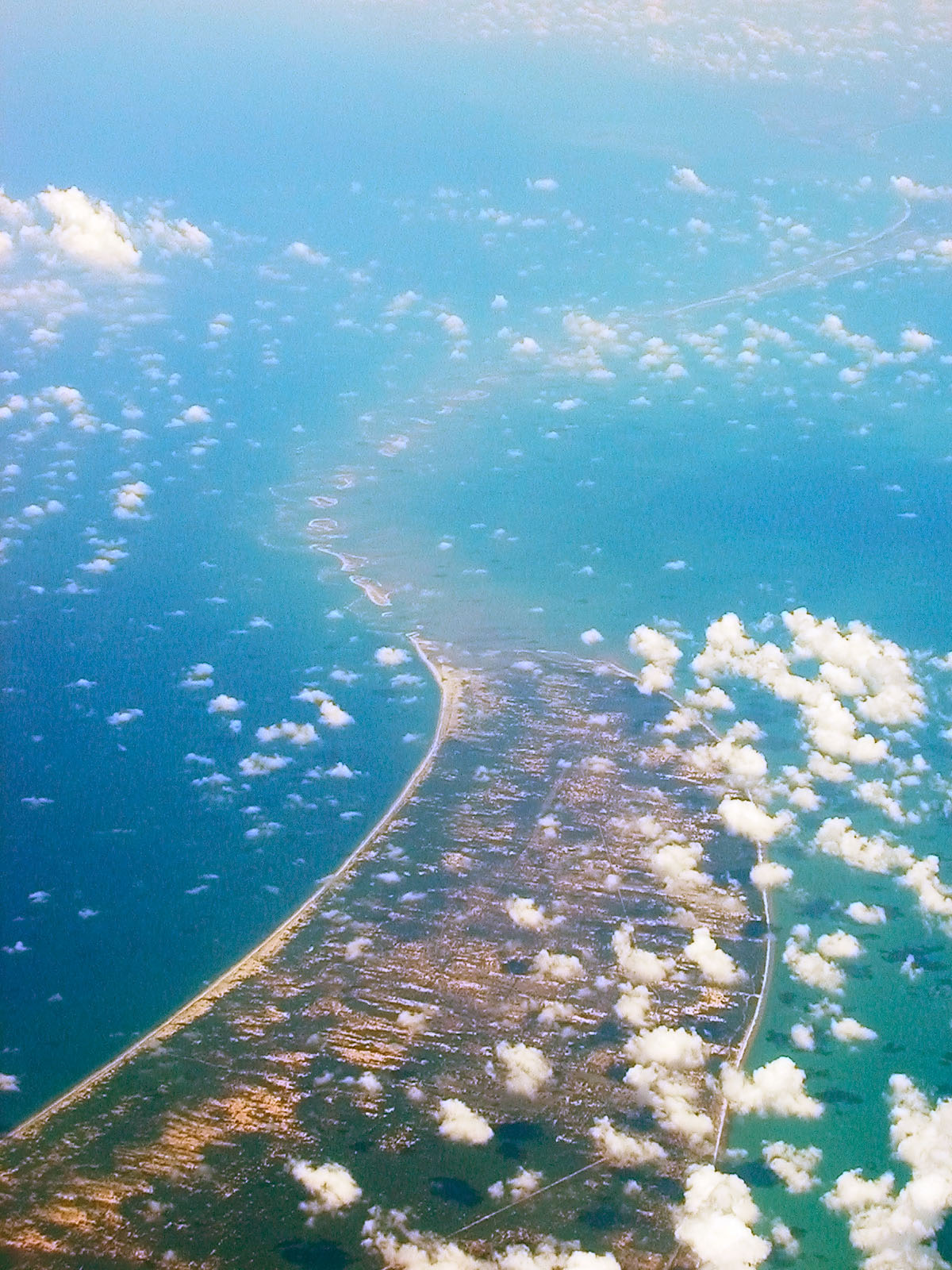
Adam's Bridge also called as Rama Setu

- As-Sirāt, a narrow bridge which every person must pass on the Yawm ad-Din ("Day of the Way of Life" i.e. Day of Judgment) to enter Paradise. (Islamic mythology)
- Bifröst, a burning rainbow bridge that reaches between Midgard (the world) and Asgard, the realm of the gods. (Norse mythology)
- Chinvat Bridge (also Bridge of the Requiter), a sifting bridge which separates the world of the living from the world of the dead and is guarded by two four-eyed dogs. (Zoroastrianism)
- Gjallarbrú (Gjöll Bridge), a covered bridge which spans the river Gjöll and must be crossed in order to reach Hel. (Norse mythology)
- Rama Setu (also Rama's Bridge), a floating bridge across the sea constructed by the apes Nala and Nila in the epic poem Ramayana. (Hindu mythology)
- Ame-no-ukihashi (Floating Bridge of Heaven), Izanagi and Izanami went to the bridge between heaven and earth to churn the sea below with Amenonuhoko. (Japanese mythology)

== Columns ==
- Djed, Isis asked for the pillar in the palace hall from the king and queen of Byblos in Lebanon, and upon being granted it, extracted the coffin from the pillar. She then consecrated the pillar, anointing it with myrrh and wrapping it in linen. This pillar came to be known as the pillar of djed. (Egyptian mythology)
- Stambha (also Skambha), a cosmic column which joins the heaven (Svarga) and the earth (prithvi). (Hindu mythology)
- Column of the Flagellation, the column which Jesus was tied to during the Flagellation of Christ, kept in the Basilica of Saint Praxedes in Rome. (Christian mythology)
- Pillar of heaven, four pillars held Heaven and the goddess Nüwa repaired the pillars after the time when Heaven and Earth were in disruption. (Chinese mythology)
- Pillar of salt, Lot's wife was turned into a pillar of salt when she looked back at the cities of Sodom and Gomorrah as they were destroyed. (Christian mythology)
- Pillars of Hercules, Hercules raised two pillars at the Strait of Gibraltar when he passed by during one of his ten labours. The tenth labour was to obtain the Cattle of Geryon. (Greek mythology)
- Ame-no-mihashira (Heavenly Pillar), Izanagi and Izanami came down from heaven and spontaneously built a central support column called the Ame-no-mihashira which upheld the "hall measuring eight fathoms" that the gods caused to appear afterwards. (Japanese mythology)

== Gates ==
- Gates of Alexander, a legendary barrier supposedly built by Alexander the Great to keep the uncivilized barbarians of the north from invading the land to the south. (Medieval legend)
- Gates of hell, various places on the surface of the world that have acquired a legendary reputation for being entrances to the underworld. Often they are found in regions of unusual geological activity, particularly volcanic areas, or sometimes at lakes, caves or mountains.
- Pearly gates, a conceptual entry to Heaven. (Christian mythology)
- Torii, the world was plunged into darkness and chaos. The wrath of Amaterasu, the Goddess of the Sun, led her to retreat to a cave in Amano-Iwato. To make her come out again, the Gods thought over several solutions and decided to set a perch with roosters at the entrance of the cave. They would then sing eternally. Intrigued by their songs, the Amaterasu walked out of the cave, and the world was again bathed in light. Later, people decided to build bird perches at the entrances of shrines. (Japanese mythology)
- Gates of Tartarus, a gate flanked by adamantine columns, a substance so hard that nothing can cut through it, akin to diamond. (Roman mythology)

== Nets ==
- Indra's net, one of the weapons of the sky-god Indra, used to snare and entangle enemies. The net also signifies magic or illusion. (Hindu mythology)
- Rán's net, a net in which she tried to capture men who ventured out on the sea. Her net is also mentioned in Reginsmál and in the Völsunga saga, where she lends it to Loki so that he can capture Andvari. (Norse mythology)
- Ogun's net, the unbreakable net that Ogun used to trap his wife Oya and her lover Shango when he caught them engaging in sexual activity. He subsequently dragged them, while still bound, before Olorun for judgement. In the versions of this myth from the Yoruba diaspora, the wife involved is Oshun. (Yoruba mythology)
- Sobek's net, Sobek caught the Four sons of Horus in a net in the Nile river. (Egyptian mythology)
- Hephaistos' net

== Weighing scales ==
- Libra (Weighing Scales), held by Dike or Astraea, the goddess of justice. (Greek and Roman mythology)
- Scale of Maat, Anubis weighed the person's heart on a scale against the feather of Maat. If the heart is lighter than the feather, the person is allowed to pass into the afterlife. If not, the heart is eaten by Ammit. (Egyptian mythology)
- Scale of justice, Themis was portrayed carrying scales. (Greek mythology)
- Mul Zibanu (Scales or Balance), which were held sacred to the sun god Shamash, who was also the patron of truth and justice. (Mesopotamian mythology)
- Famine's pair of scales, the third of the Four Horsemen of the Apocalypse rides on a Black Horse is Famine, and he who sat on it had a pair of scales in his hand. (Christian mythology)

== Sharpening stones ==
- Odin's whetstone, Baugi had nine thralls who killed each other in their desire to possess Odin's magical sharpening stone. (Norse mythology)
- Whetstone of Tudwal Tudglyd, sharpens the blade of a fine warrior. It shall draw blood from any enemy of its user if its user be brave; if its user shall be cowardly, than the blade shall not be sharpened and draw no blood whatsoever. (Welsh mythology)

== Wheels ==
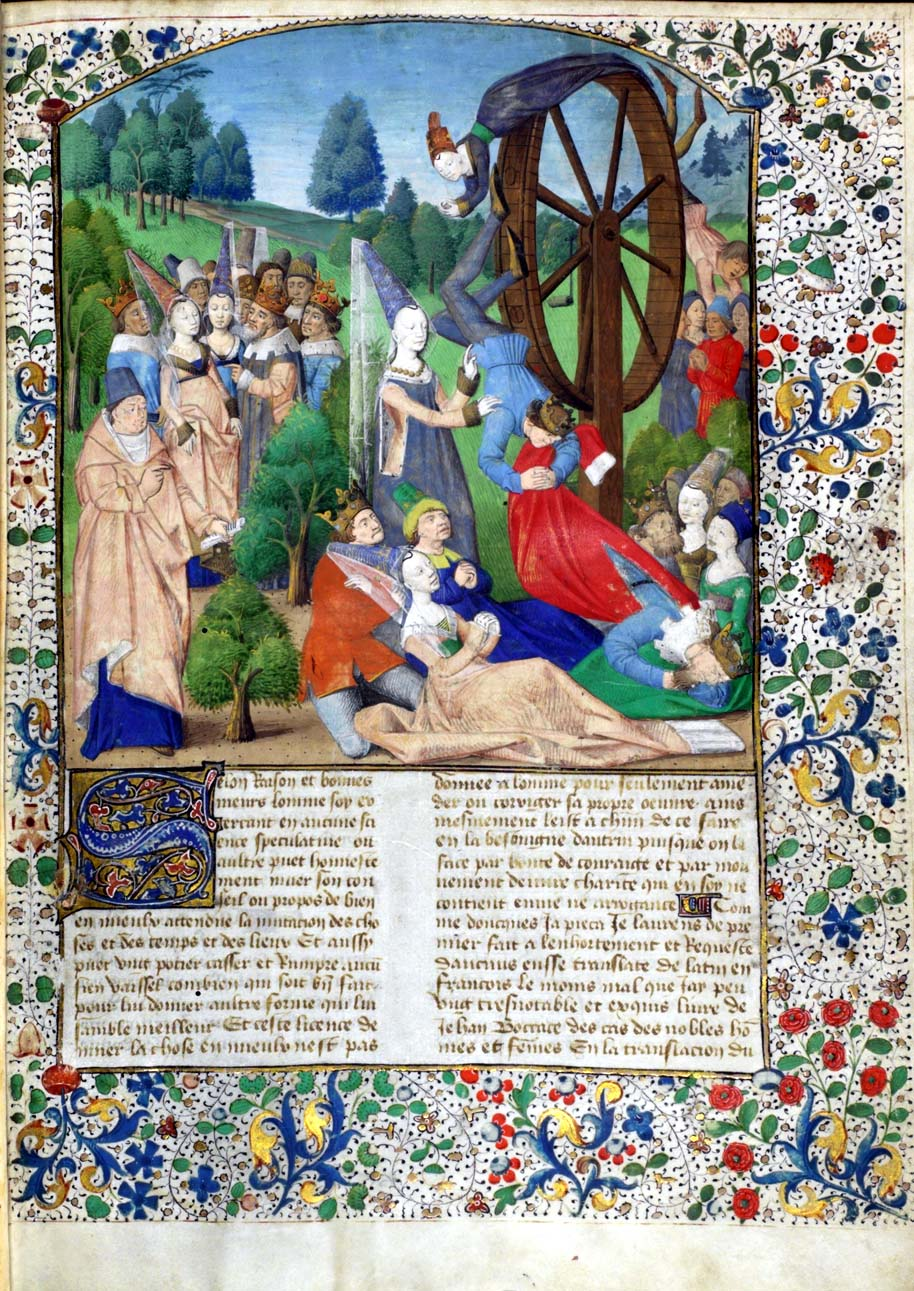
Fortune Wheel

- Rota Fortunae (Wheel of Fortune), a concept referring to the capricious nature of Fate. The wheel belongs to the goddess Fortuna, who spins it at random, changing the positions of those on the wheel – some suffer great misfortune, while others gain windfalls. (Greek mythology)
- Wheel of time (also wheel of history and Kalachakra), is a concept found in several religious traditions and philosophies, which regard time as cyclical and consisting of repeating ages. (Hindu mythology)
- Wheel of fire, which Ixion was bound to as punishment for lusting after Zeus's wife, Hera. (Greek mythology)

== Buildings ==
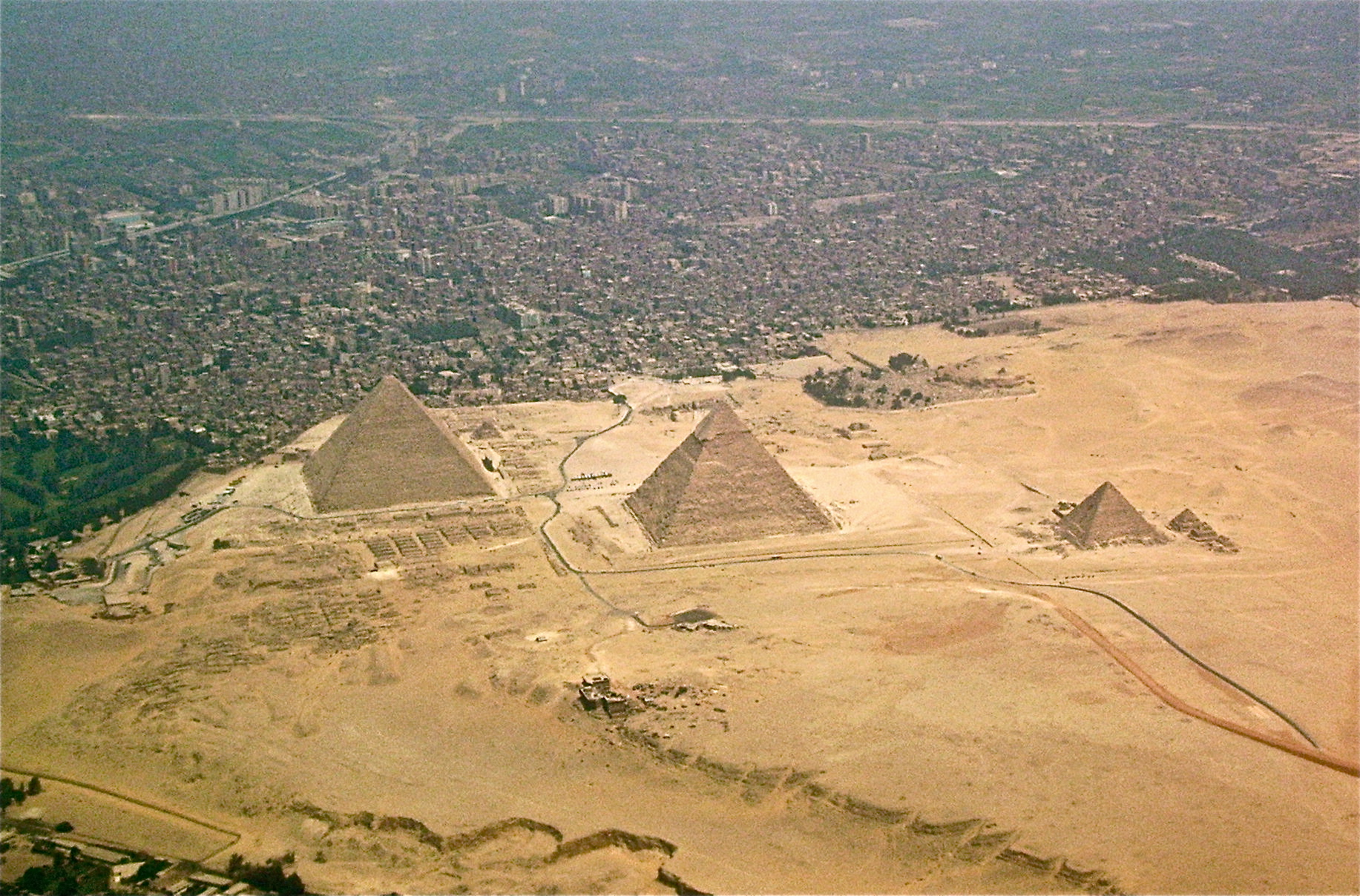
Giza pyramids

- Pyramid, a belief that the ancient Egyptian pyramids and objects of similar shape can confer a variety of benefits. Among these assumed properties are the ability to preserve foods, sharpen or maintain the sharpness of razor blades, etc. (Egyptian mythology)
- World Mill (also Heavenly Mill and Cosmic Mill), a theme suggested as recurring in Indo-European and other mythologies. It involves the analogy of the cosmos or firmament and a rotating millstone. (Proto-Indo-European religion)
- Tower of Babel, a united humanity agreed to build a tower "tall enough to reach heaven"; seeing this, God, confounded their speech so that they could no longer understand each other and scattered them around the world. (Jewish mythology/Christian mythology)
- Heorot (Hall of the Hart), a mead-hall described in the Anglo-Saxon epic Beowulf as "the foremost of halls under heaven". It served as a palace for King Hroðgar, a legendary Danish king of the sixth century. (Anglo-Saxon mythology)
- Ryūgū-jō (Dragon Palace Castle), undersea palace of Ryūjin, the dragon god of the sea. Depending on the version of the legend, it is built from red and white coral, or from solid crystal. (Japanese mythology)
- Maleperduis, Reynard the Fox's principal hideaway, which is full of holes which Reynard can open and shut to elude his enemies. (Medieval legends)
- Caer Dathyl, a fortress in Arfon in northern Gwynedd referred to in the Four Branches of the Mabinogi, the Tale of Math fab Mathonwy. (Welsh mythology)
- Caer Sidi (also Caer Siddi), a legendary otherworld fortress mentioned in Middle Welsh mythological poems in the Book of Taliesin. (Welsh mythology)
- Chicken-legged hut, Baba Yaga lives in a house standing on chicken legs, which enables the house to move about in accordance with Baba Yaga's wishes. When her house moves it spins while emitting a screeching noise. (Russian folklore)
- Soria Moria Castle, the three princesses live in Soria Moria Castle, and only the West Wind knew where the castle was located. (Scandinavian folklore)
- Santa's workshop, the legendary workshop where Santa Claus is said to make the toys and presents, given out at Christmas. (Elf (film))

== Wings ==
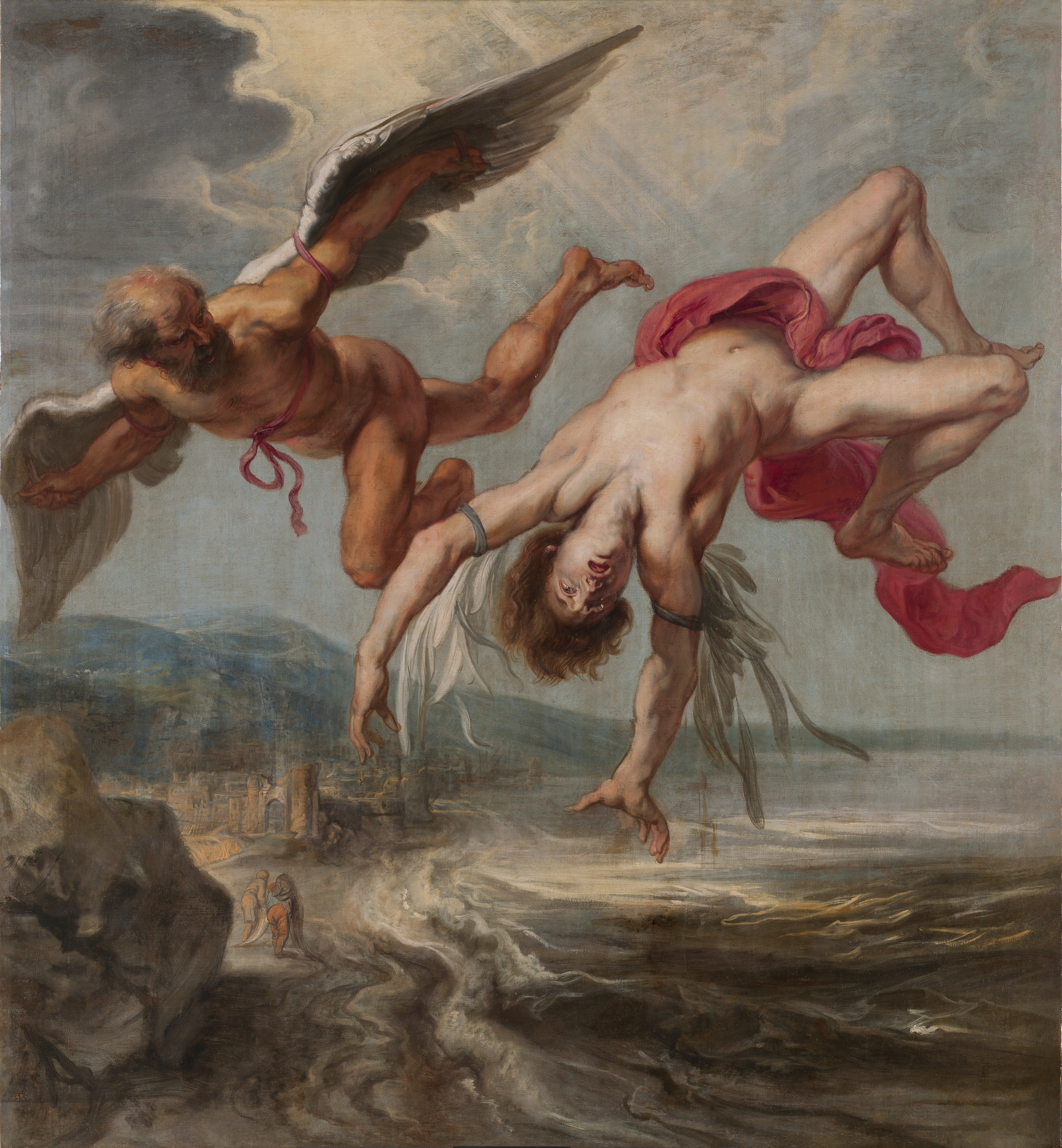
The fall of Icarus

- Icarus' wings, which were made by Daedalus out of wax and bird feathers.
- Egil's wings, Völund is held captive at Nidung's court. To help his brother, Egil shoots birds and collects their feathers, of which Völund makes a pair of wings and flies away. (Norse mythology)

== Astronomical objects ==
- Nibiru, a pseudoscientific proposed outer planet within the Solar System, described by Zecharia Sitchin.
- Planet X, a hypothetical planet, now disproven, proposed in 1906 by Percival Lowell to have existed beyond the planet Neptune.
- Sun, the earliest understanding of the Sun was that of a disk in the sky, whose presence above the horizon creates day and whose absence causes night. In the Bronze Age, this understanding was modified by assuming that the Sun is transported across the sky in a boat or a chariot, and transported back to the place of sunrise during the night passing through the underworld. In many cultures, such as Aboriginal and Native American legends, the raven stole the sun and placed it in the sky.
- Counter-Earth (also Antichthon), a hypothetical planet always on the other side of the Sun from Earth.
- Kolob, a star or planet described in the Book of Abraham. It is the heavenly body nearest to the Throne of God. (Book of Mormon)
- Neith, a hypothetical natural satellite of Venus reportedly sighted by Giovanni Cassini in 1672 and by several other astronomers in following years.
- Chiron, the name given to a supposed moon of Saturn sighted by Hermann Goldschmidt in 1861. It has since been determined that no such moon exists.
- Themis, William H. Pickering announced the discovery of a tenth satellite of Saturn. The photographic plates on which it supposedly appeared, thirteen in all, spanned a period between April 17 and July 8, 1904. However, no other astronomer has ever confirmed Pickering's claim.
- Phaeton, an hypothetical planet hypothesized by the Titius–Bode law to have existed between the orbits of Mars and Jupiter, the destruction of which supposedly led to the formation of the asteroid belt (including the dwarf planet Ceres).
- Tyche, an hypothetical gas giant located in the Solar System's Oort cloud, first proposed in 1999 by astrophysicists John Matese, Patrick Whitman and Daniel Whitmire of the University of Louisiana at Lafayette.
- Vulcan, a small hypothetical planet that was proposed to exist in an orbit between Mercury and the Sun. The 19th-century French mathematician Urbain Le Verrier hypothesized that peculiarities in Mercury's orbit were the result of another planet.
- Vulcanoid, a hypothetical population of asteroids that orbit the Sun in a dynamically stable zone inside the orbit of the planet Mercury. They are named after the hypothetical planet Vulcan, whose existence was disproven in 1915 with the advent of general relativity. So far, no vulcanoids have been discovered, and it is not yet clear whether any exist.
- Planet V, a hypothetical fifth terrestrial planet posited by NASA scientists John Chambers and Jack J. Lissauer to have once existed between Mars and the asteroid belt.
- Nemesis, a hypothetical red dwarf or brown dwarf, originally postulated in 1984 to be orbiting the Sun at a distance of about 95,000 AU (1.5 light-years), somewhat beyond the Oort cloud, to explain a perceived cycle of mass extinctions in the geological record, which seem to occur more often at intervals of 26 million years.
- Lilith, a fictitious invisible second moon of Earth, supposedly about the same mass as the Earth's Moon, proposed in 1918 by astrologer Walter Gorn Old.
- Star of Ishtar (also Star of Inanna), a symbol of the ancient Sumerian goddess Inanna and her East Semitic counterpart Ishtar. Because Ishtar was associated with the planet Venus, the star is also known as the Star of Venus. (Mesopotamian mythology)
- Winged sun, a symbol associated with divinity, royalty and power. (Egyptian mythology)

== Torture devices ==
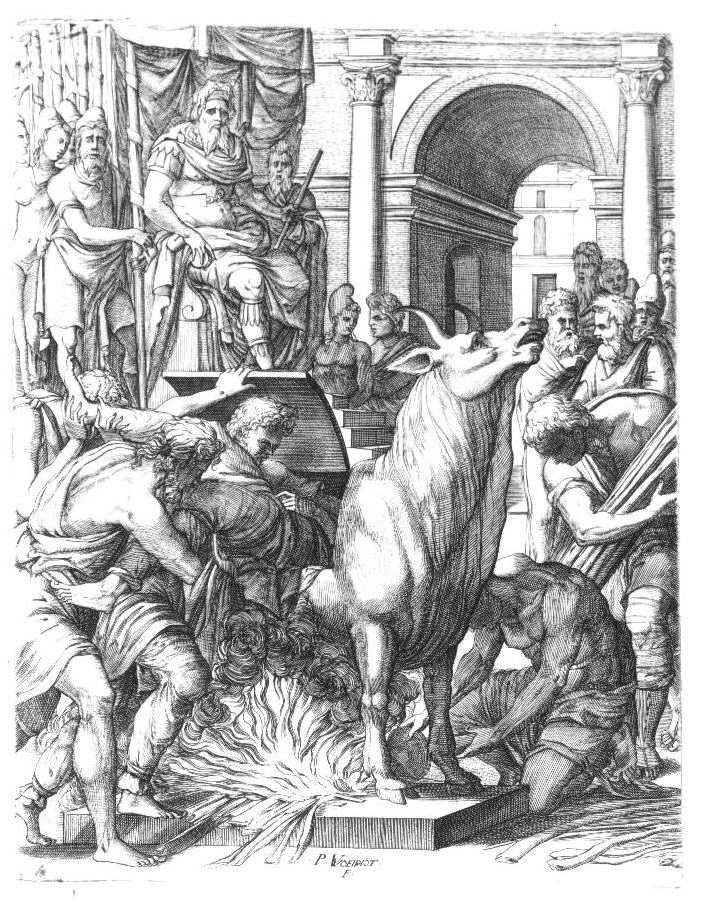
Perillos being forced into the brazen bull that he built for Phalaris

- Brazen bull (also Bronze bull or Sicilian bull), an alleged torture and execution device invented by Perillos of Athens, who offered it to Phalaris, the tyrant of Akragas, Sicily, as a new means of executing criminals.
- Paolao, a legendary torture device created by the wicked fox spirit Daji. It was a tall bronze cylinder heated with charcoal, but if one fell off they would die. With no other alternatives one was forced to dance atop the cylinder until they died. (Chinese Mythology)

== Tools ==
- Holy Nails, the nails with which Christ was crucified. (Christian mythology)
- Rati, a drill or auger that was used by Odin during his quest to obtain the mead of poetry. (Norse mythology)
- Reginnaglar (Old Norse God Nails), are nails used for religious purposes. (Norse mythology)

== Miscellaneous ==
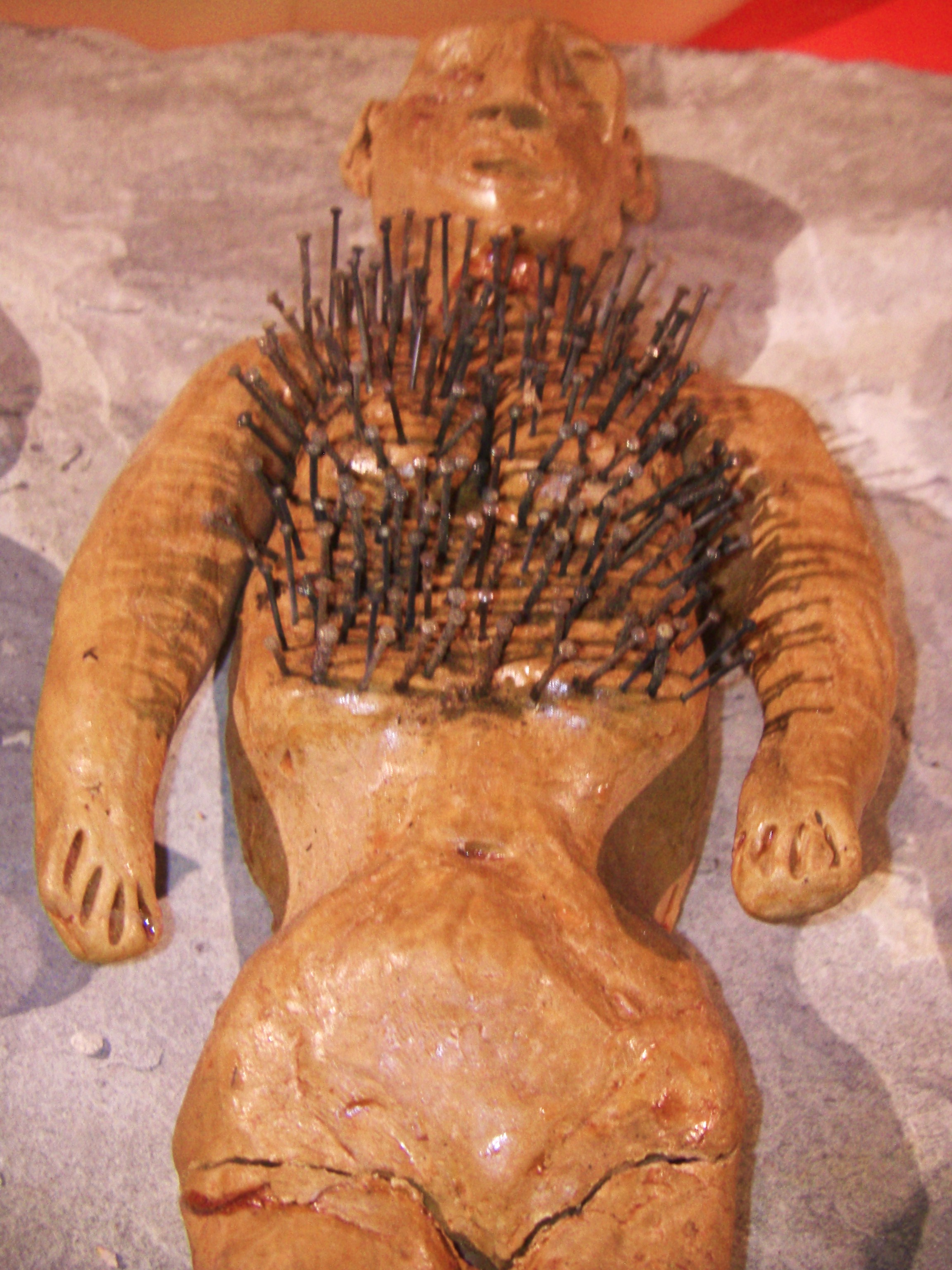
Voodoo doll with pins in it, Museum of Witchcraft

- Chessboard of Gwenddoleu ap Ceidio, a large chess board made of gold with pieces of silver and crystal. The pieces play by themselves if set up correctly. (Welsh mythology)
- Neith's loom, which Neith uses to weave all of existence into being. (Egyptian mythology)
- Father Time's hourglass, carrying an hourglass representing time's constant movement. Many believe that Father Time, like the Grim Reaper, is constantly watching humans and has each and every one of their hourglasses slowly decreasing, sand casually slipping through the hands of time.
- Bangu, a bell in Glasgwm Church which was gifted by Saint David. Once a woman took the bell to the nearby town of Rharadr. Her husband was imprisoned in the castle and she believed that if she rang the bell he would be released. But the guards seized it and chased her out of town. That night the town was destroyed by fire, and the only part of it which escaped the flames was the wall on which the sacred bell was hanging. (Medieval legend)
- Voodoo doll, an effigy into which pins are inserted. Although it comes in various different forms, such practices are found in the magical traditions of many cultures across the world. (English folklore)
- Dreamcatcher, the Ojibwe storytellers speak of the Spider Woman, known as Asibikaashi; she took care of the children and the people on the land. Eventually, the Ojibwe Nation spread across North America and it became difficult for Asibikaashi to reach all the children. So the mothers and grandmothers would weave magical webs for the children, using willow hoops and sinew, or cordage made from plants. The dreamcatchers would filter out all bad dreams and only allow good thoughts to enter our mind. Once the sun rises, all bad dreams just disappear. (Anishinaabe mythology)
- Ibong Adarna's droppings, said to turn living beings into stone upon contact. (Philippine mythology)
- Kave's apron, according to legend, a Persian blacksmith made a battle flag by hanging his smith's apron from a spear, and used it to rally the people against the wicked king, Zahak. (Persian mythology)
- Koschei's needle, Koschei cannot be killed by conventional means targeting his body. His soul is hidden separate from his body inside a needle, which is in an egg, inside of a duck, inside of a hare, in an iron chest buried under a green oak tree, which is on the island of Buyan. (Slavic folklore)
- Shirikodama, Kappas can gain power by taking human's shirikodama, a mythical ball said to contain the soul. (Japanese mythology)
- Crystal skull, some individuals believe in the paranormal claim that crystal skulls can produce a variety of miracles.
- Vasilisa's doll, Vasilisa's mother gave her a tiny wooden doll with instructions to give it a little to eat and a little to drink if she were in need. (Russian folklore)
- Sheelah's brush (also Sheelagh's brush or Sheila's brush), the alleged wife of Saint Patrick who would sweep the winter away and gives one last snowstorm after Saint Patrick's Day. (Irish folklore)
- Jacob's ladder, a ladder leading to heaven that was featured in a dream Jacob had during his flight from his brother Esau in the Book of Genesis. (Abrahamic religions)
- Vase of Soissons, legendary sacred vase, probably in precious metal.

=== From Greek mythology ===
- Winnowing Oar, an object that appears in Books XI and XXIII of Homer's Odyssey.
- Athena's bridle, Polyeidos told Bellerophon to sleep in the temple of Athena. While he slept, he dreamed that Athena set a golden bridle beside him. He awoke and found the bridle he dreamt about in his hands. Afterwards, he went to the meadow Pegasus was grazing at, and was able to bridle and tame Pegasus without difficulty.
- Talos, a giant bronze automaton to protect Europa in Crete from pirates and invaders.

=== From Norse mythology ===
- Svefnthorn (Sleep Thorn), used to put an adversary into a deep sleep from which they would not awaken for a long time.
- Friggerock (Frigg's distaff), the Orion's Belt asterism within the constellation of Orion was once known as "Frigg's Distaff". To explain this attribution, some scholars have pointed out that the constellation is on the celestial equator and thus the stars rotating in the night sky may have been associated with Frigg's spinning wheel.

=== From Christian mythology ===
Early Hebrew Conception of the Universe

- Firmament, the structure above the atmosphere, conceived as a vast solid dome according to the Biblical cosmology. According to the Genesis creation narrative, God created the firmament to separate the "waters above" the earth from the "waters below" the earth.
- True Cross, the name for the physical remnants which, by a Catholic church tradition, are believed to be from the cross upon which Jesus was crucified.
- Shroud of Turin (also Turin Shroud), a length of linen cloth bearing the image of a man, is believed by some to be the burial shroud of Jesus of Nazareth.
- Sudarium of Oviedo (also Shroud of Oviedo), a bloodstained piece of cloth that is claimed to be the cloth wrapped around the head of Jesus Christ after he died.
- Image of Edessa, a holy relic consisting of a square or rectangle of cloth upon which a miraculous image of the face of Jesus had been imprinted.
- Holy Sponge, a sponge dipped in vinegar (or in some translations sour wine), most likely posca, a favorite beverage of Roman soldiers, and offered to Christ to drink during the crucifixion.

=== From the Book of Mormon ===
- Liahona, a compass-like device given by God to the prophet Lehi and his family to help them navigate through the wilderness. It was powered by faith and obedience to God and if anyone in the party lost faith or sinned, it would stop working until that person repented.
- Title of Liberty, a battle standard used by Captain Moroni to rally the Nephites to arms against the armies of Amalickiah. It was made from Moroni's torn cloak, upon which he wrote, "In memory of our God, our religion, and freedom, and our peace, our wives, and our children".
