= List of mythological objects (Hindu mythology) =

The following is a list of various Historical objects described in Hindu literature.

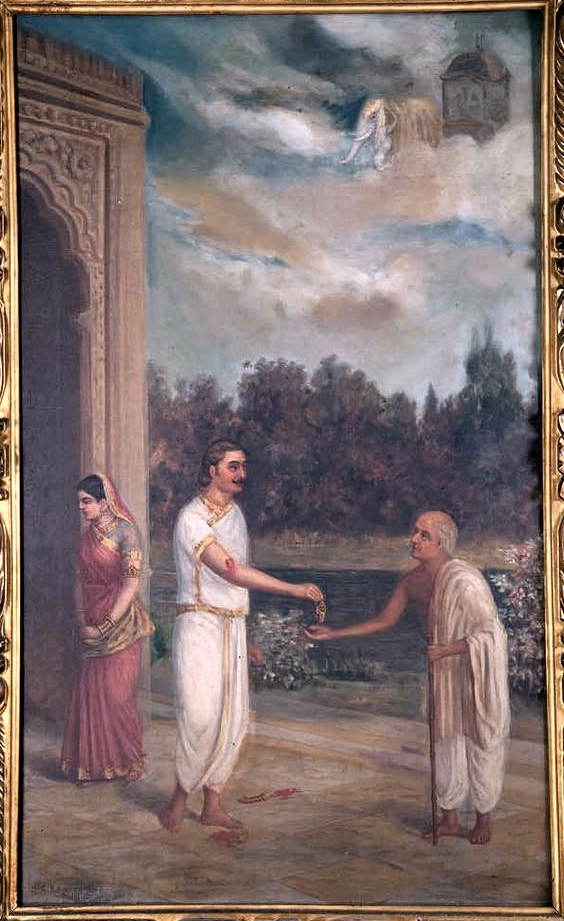
Karna offers his armour to Indra, disguised as an old man

== Armour ==
- Karna Kavacha - The armour of Karna that was granted to him by his father Surya at birth, offering him virtual invulnerability.
- Brahma Kavacha - The armour of Brahma which will make its wielder couldn't harm by any weapon. In Ramayana Ravana and Atikaya, in Mahabharata, * Arjuna and Duryodhana used this.
- Shiva Kavacha - The armour of Shiva which will make its wielder invincible.
- Indra Kavacha : Granted by Indra to Arjuna, making him invulnerable
- Varaha Kavacha : Granted by Varaha (Vishnu's boar avatar) to Bhima, offering protection.

== Vessels ==
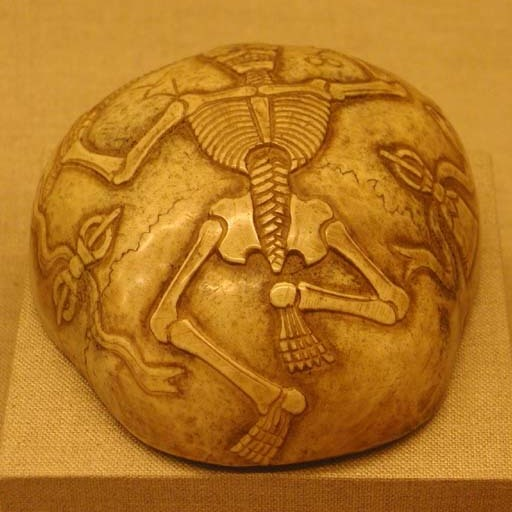
Kapala skull cup

- Kalasha - the kalasha is considered a symbol of abundance and "source of life" in the Vedas. It is referred to as "overflowing full vase" in the Vedas. The kalasha is believed to contain amrita, the elixir of life, and thus is viewed as a symbol of abundance, wisdom, and immortality. The kalasha is often seen in Hindu iconography as an attribute, in the hands of Hindu deities like the creator god Brahma, the destroyer god Shiva as a teacher, and the goddess of prosperity Lakshmi.
- Kamandalu, kamandal, or kamandalam - an oblong water pot made of a dry gourd (pumpkin) or coconut shell, metal, wood of the Kamandalataru tree, or from clay, usually with a handle and sometimes with a spout. The kamandalu is used in Hindu iconography, in depiction of deities related with asceticism or water. It is, thus, viewed as a symbol of ascetism in Hinduism. Adi Shankaracharya’s ashtotaram hymn praises Shiva whose hand is adorned with the kamandalu. Other deities like the fire-god Agni and the preceptor of the gods, Brihaspati, are depicted carrying the kamandalu.
- Kapala - (Sanskrit for "skull") or skullcup is a cup made from a human skull used as a ritual implement (bowl) in both Hindu and Buddhist Tantra.
- Kumbha - a type of pottery in India. It symbolises the womb, thus it represents fertility, life, generative power of human beings and sustenance and is generally associated with devis, particularly Ganga.
- Akshaya Patra - Akshayapatra (means an inexhaustible vessel), is an object from Hindu theology. It was a wonderful vessel given to Yudishtira by the Lord Surya which provided a never-failing supply of food to the Pandavas every day.
- Akshaya Tunira - the inexhaustible quiver of arrows of Arjuna, offered to him by Agni.

== Flags ==
- Garudadhvaja - The flag of Vishnu.
- Indradhvaja - The flag of Indra.
- Kakkadhvaja - The flag of Jyestha.
- Kapidhvaja or Vanaradhvaja - The flag of Arjuna.
- Makaradhvaja - The flag of Kamadeva.
- Kukkutadhvaja - The flag of Kartikeya.
- Vrishadhvaja - The flag of Shiva.

== Flora ==
=== Plants ===
- Ausadhirdipyamanas - These are healing plants capable of phosphorescence. They are used for healing and rejuvenations in battle. These are used by the Ashvins.
- Eraká grass - The grass that grew from the cast away powdered iron-bolt belonging to Samba. It was used to destroy the Yadu race, as it miraculously turned into an iron-bolt in the hands of its wielders.
- Kusha grass - The Kusha grass is specifically recommended by Krishna in the Bhagavad Gita as part of the ideal seat for meditation.
- Padma - The lotus plays a central role in Indian religions such as Hinduism, Buddhism, Sikhism, and Jainism. Hindus revere it with the gods Vishnu, Brahma, and to a lesser degree Kubera, as well as the goddesses Lakshmi and Saraswati. They are regarded as an exemplar of divine beauty and purity.
- Saugandhika flower - This was a lotus flower that was sought after by Bhima (for Draupadi) during the Pandavas exile. It was found in Kubera's pond.
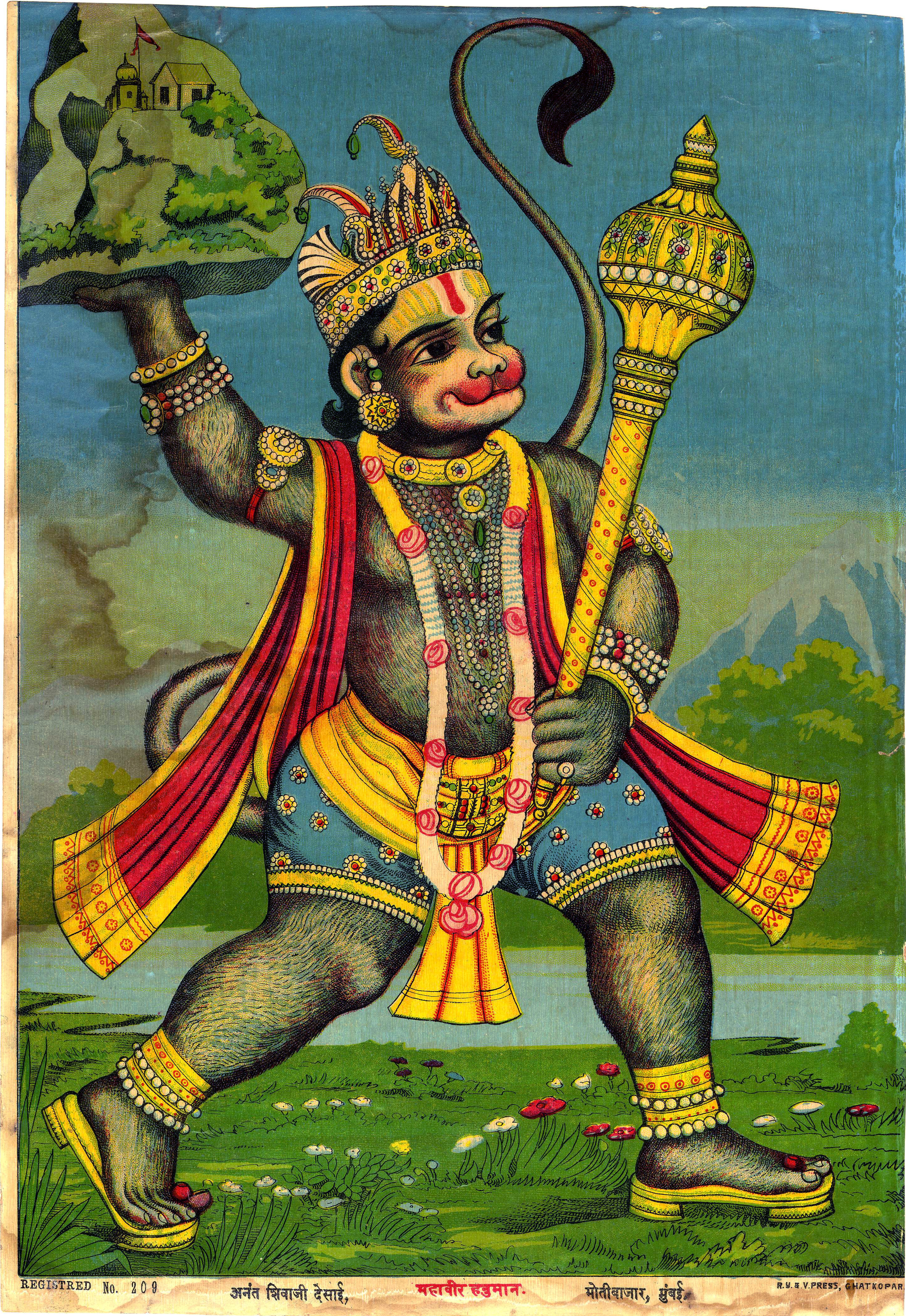
  Hanuman retrieves Sanjeevani by taking the entire mountain
- Sanjeevani - Sanjeevani is a magical herb which has the power to cure any malady. It is believed that medicines prepared from this herb could revive a dead person.
- Tulasi - The holy basil is a sacred plant in Hindu belief. Hindus regard it as an earthly manifestation of the goddess Tulasi; As the incarnation of Lakshmi, she is regarded as a great worshipper of the god Vishnu.

=== Trees ===
- The Tree of Jiva and Atman - This tree appears in the Vedic scriptures as a metaphysical metaphor concerning the soul.
- Amalika - The veneration of the amla tree in particular is due to the belief that the god Vishnu resides in and near the tree, particularly on Amalaka Ekadashi.
- Ashoka tree - The ashoka tree is closely associated with the yakshis, the nature spirits.
- Atti - In the Atharvaveda, the fig tree is given prominence as a means for acquiring prosperity and vanquishing foes.
- Bilva tree - This is a sacred tree and used to worship Shiva.
- Kadamba - The kadamba is mentioned in the Bhagavata Purana. In North India, it is associated with Krishna while in the south it is known as "Parvati’s tree". The kadamba tree is also associated with a tree deity called Kadambariyamman.

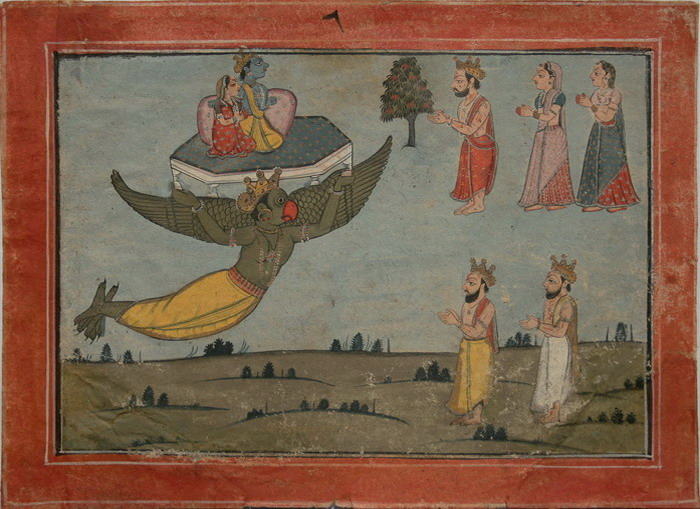
Krishna and Satyabhama steal Indra's Parijata tree

- Parijata - The divine flowering tree with blossoms that never fade or wilt - taken to Indraloka by the devas.
- Sala tree - In Hindu tradition, the sala tree is said to be favoured by Vishnu. It is also associated with salabhanjika or shalabhanjika (also known as madanakai, madanika, or shilabalika).
- Akshayavata (Indestructible Banyan Tree) - It is a sacred fig tree. The sage Markandeya asked Narayana to show him a specimen of the divine power. Narayana flooded the entire world for a moment, during which only the Akshayavata could be seen above the water level.
- Kalpavriksha (also Kalpataru, Kalpadruma or Kalpapādapa) - It is a wish-fulfilling divine tree in Hindu mythology.
- Ashvattha (also Assattha) - A sacred tree for the Hindus and has been extensively mentioned in texts pertaining to Hinduism, mentioned as 'peepul' (Ficus religiosa) in Rig Veda mantra I.164.20. Buddhist texts term the tree as Bodhi tree, a tree under which Gautama Buddha meditated and gained enlightenment.

== Jewellery ==
- Keyur - Keyur is the golden jewellery, worn by Krishna on his arm (armlet), over the biceps.
- Kiriti - The celestial diadem, presented by Indra to Arjuna.

Kundala

- Karna Kundala - The indestructible ear-rings of Karna made from amrita grants him immortality and protection from any kinds of poison and diseases (was present at his birth).
- Makarakundala - Makara shaped ear-rings are sometimes worn by the Hindu gods, for example Shiva, the Destroyer, or the Preserver-god Vishnu, the Sun god Surya, and the Mother Goddess Chandi and also Lord Vitthal wears Makara Kundala.
- Shiva Kundala - The Hindu God Shiva wears two earrings or Kundalas. Traditional images of Shiva depict the two earrings named - Alakshya and Niranjan. Alakshya is believed to be one that cannot be shown by any sign. Niranjan is said to be one that cannot be seen by mortal eyes.

== Garland|Mala ==
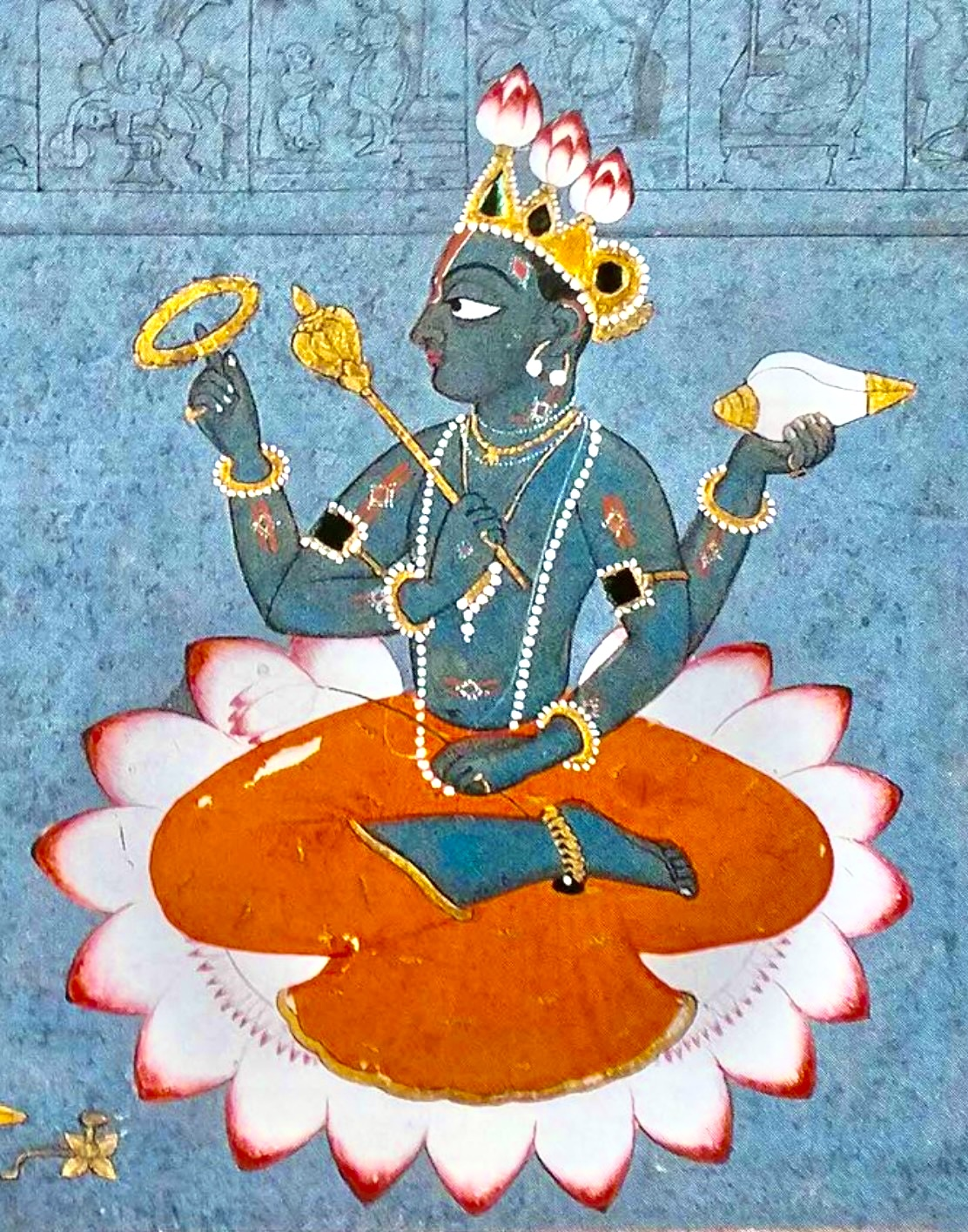
Vishnu wearing the vaijayanti-mala

- Akshamala - garland of Brahma.
- Padma-mala - Amba performed austerities and pleased Kartikeya, the god of war. He granted Amba a garland of ever-fresh lotuses and declared that whoever wore it will destroy Bhishma.
- Khadgamala - Khaḍgamālā, Sanskrit: खड्गमाला, "Garland of the Sword".
- Mundamala (also called Kapalamala or Rundamala) - The mundamala is a garland of severed human heads and/or skulls. It is characteristic of fearsome aspects of Kali and Shiva.
- Vaijayanti-mala - Literally meaning, "the garland of victory". The Vaijayanti or Vyjayanti is a mythical flower, offered to Krishna and Vishnu in worship as a garland.

Mukuta

- Jata-mukuta (headdress formed of piled, matted hair) - Worn by gods such as Shiva, Brahma, Chamunda, Maheshvari etc.
- Karaṇḍa mukuṭa (conical basket-shaped crown) - The crown of Varahi, Brahmani.
- Kirita-makuta (tall conical crown) - The crown of Vishnu, Vaishnavi, Indrani.
- Ratna mukuta (jewelled crown) - The crown of Ganesha, remover of obstacles.

Mani

- Ashwathama's Gem - Ashwathama had a valuable gem or Mani, set on his forehead, the wearer of which ceases to have any fear from weapons or disease or hunger, and ceases to have any fear of gods, Danavas and Nagas.
- Chandra-Kānta - 'The moon-stone' . A gem or stone said to be formed from the congealed rays of the moon. It is also called Manī-chaka.
- Chintamani - a wish-fulfilling jewel, anything wished by holding it in the hands can be availed.
- Kaustubha - Is a divine jewel or "Mani", which is in the possession of Lord Vishnu.
- Nagamani - The gem that lies on the nagaraja Vasuki's head.
- Syamantaka (also Syamantakamani and Shyamantaka Jewel) - The most famous jewel that is supposed to be blessed with magical powers.
- Vaidurya - most precious of all stones, sparkling beauty beyond compare, the stone worn by the goddess Lakshmi

== Instruments ==
Goddess Saraswati depicted playing the veena

=== Drums ===
- Damaru or damru (a small two-headed drum) - The damru is known as the instrument of the deity Shiva, and is said to have been created by Shiva in order to produce the spiritual sounds by which the whole universe was created and regulated.
- Mridangam or tannumai in Tamil (wooden double-headed drum) - Nandi is said to have played the mridangam during Shiva's primordial tandava dance, causing a divine rhythm to resound across the heavens. The mridangam is thus also known as "Deva Vaadyam" or "Divine Instrument".

=== Wind instruments ===
- Nandni Vardhanam - The Conch of Satyaki.
- Panchajanya - a Shankha conch shell of the Hindu god Vishnu.
- Shankha - A conch shell which is of ritual and religious importance in both Hinduism and Buddhism. The Shankha is a sacred emblem of the Hindu preserver god Vishnu. It is still used as a trumpet in Hindu ritual, and in the past was used as a war trumpet.
- Yogesha Nadam - The conch of Shiva.
- Venu - The venu (a bamboo transverse flute) is associated with Krishna, who is often depicted playing it. Also one of the form of Devi Matangi as Venu Shyamala.

=== String instruments ===
- Mahathi - The veena of Narada (a Vedic sage).
- Saraswati veena - The veena of Saraswati, Hindu goddess of knowledge, music, arts, wisdom and learning.
- Rudra veena - As Rudra is a name for the Hindu god Shiva, rudra vina literally means "the veena dear to Shiva".

== Substances ==
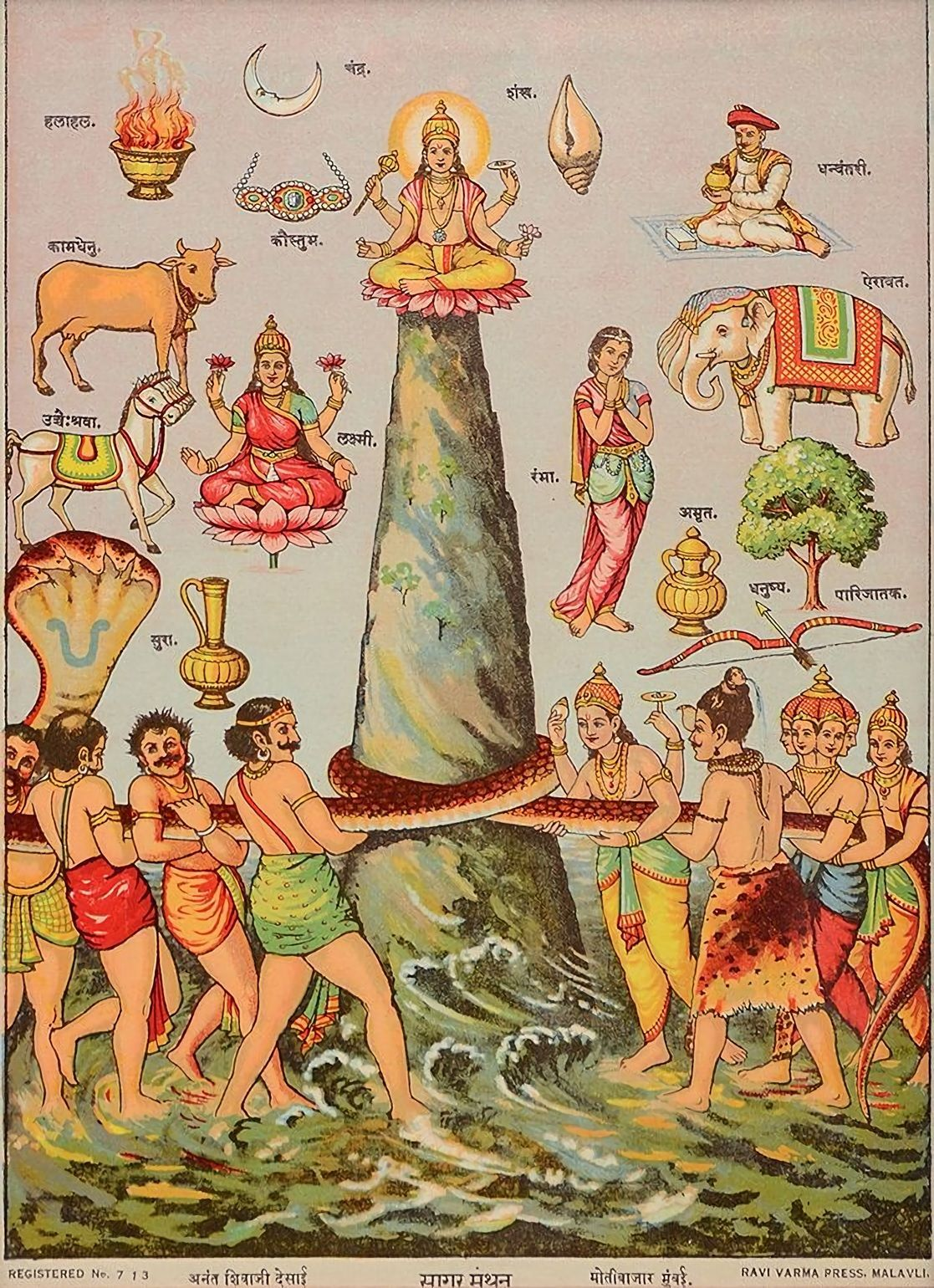
Poster depicting the Samudra Manthana

- Amrita - The nectar produced from the Samudra Manthana, which upon consuming, granted the gods immortality.
- Halahala (also called 'kalakuta') - The Samudra Manthana process released a number of things from the Ocean of Milk. One was the lethal poison known as Halahala. This terrified the gods and demons because the poison was so powerful that it could destroy all of creation. Shiva consumed the poison in an act to protect the universe.
- Soma (Sanskrit) or Haoma (Avestan) - It is described as being prepared by extracting juice from the stalks of a certain plant. In both Vedic and Zoroastrian tradition, the name of the drink and the plant are the same, and also personified as a divinity, the three forming a religious or mythological unity.

== Treasures ==
- Navaratna - The sacred nine gems or treasures.
- Nidhi - The nine treasures (navanidhi) belonging to Kubera, the god of wealth.
- Ratnas - The fourteen treasures produced during the Samudra Manthana.

== Vehicles ==
=== Chariots ===
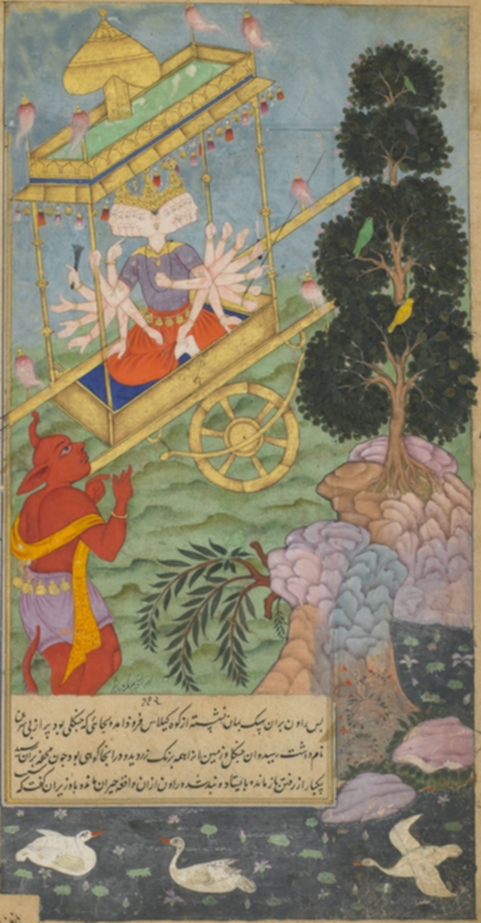
Ravana rides his Vimana, Pushpaka.

- Yayati's chariot - A divine chariot which could travel in any direction unimpeded, employed by King Yayati.
- Rahu's chariot - The deity rides a chariot drawn by eight black horses.
- Surya's chariot - The chariot of Surya, charioteered by Aruna and drawn by seven horses.

=== Vahana ===
- Vahana - It denotes the being, typically an animal or mythical entity, a particular Hindu deity is said to use as a vehicle. In this capacity, the vahana is often called the deity's "mount".

=== Vimana ===
- Hansa Vimana - a flying machine/ personal plane of Lord Brahma, it is driven by swans and is completely white in colour.
  - Pushpaka Vimana or Dandu Monara - Pushpaka was originally made by Vishvakarma for Brahma, the Hindu god of creation; later Brahma gave it to Kubera, the god of wealth; but it was later stolen, along with Lanka, by his half-brother, king Ravana.

== Weapons ==
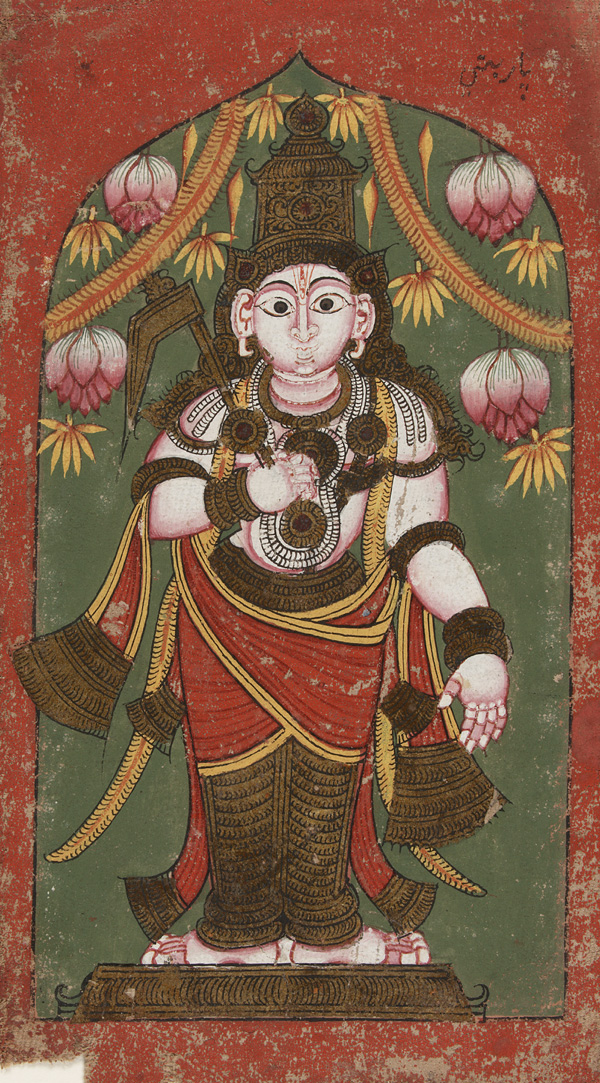
Balarama holding his famous halayudha

- Anrita - The name of one of the mystical weapons delivered to Ráma by Viswámitra, as mentioned in the Rámáyana.
- Ayudhapurusha - The anthropomorphic depiction of a divine weapon in Hindu art. Ayudhapurushas are sometimes considered as partial incarnates of their divine owners.
- Indra's net - The net was one of the weapons of the sky-god Indra, used to snare and entangle enemies. The net also signifies magic or illusion.

=== Shastra ===
- Ankusha - An elephant goad that is one of the eight auspicious objects known as Astamangala. Ankusha is also an attribute of many Hindu gods, including Ganesha.
- Balachita - A plough used as a weapon by Balarama, brother of Krishna.
- Chentu - A horse whip which looks like a crooked stick, and is a typical attribute of Ayyanar, Krishna in his aspect as Rajagopala, and Shiva with Nandi

Danda

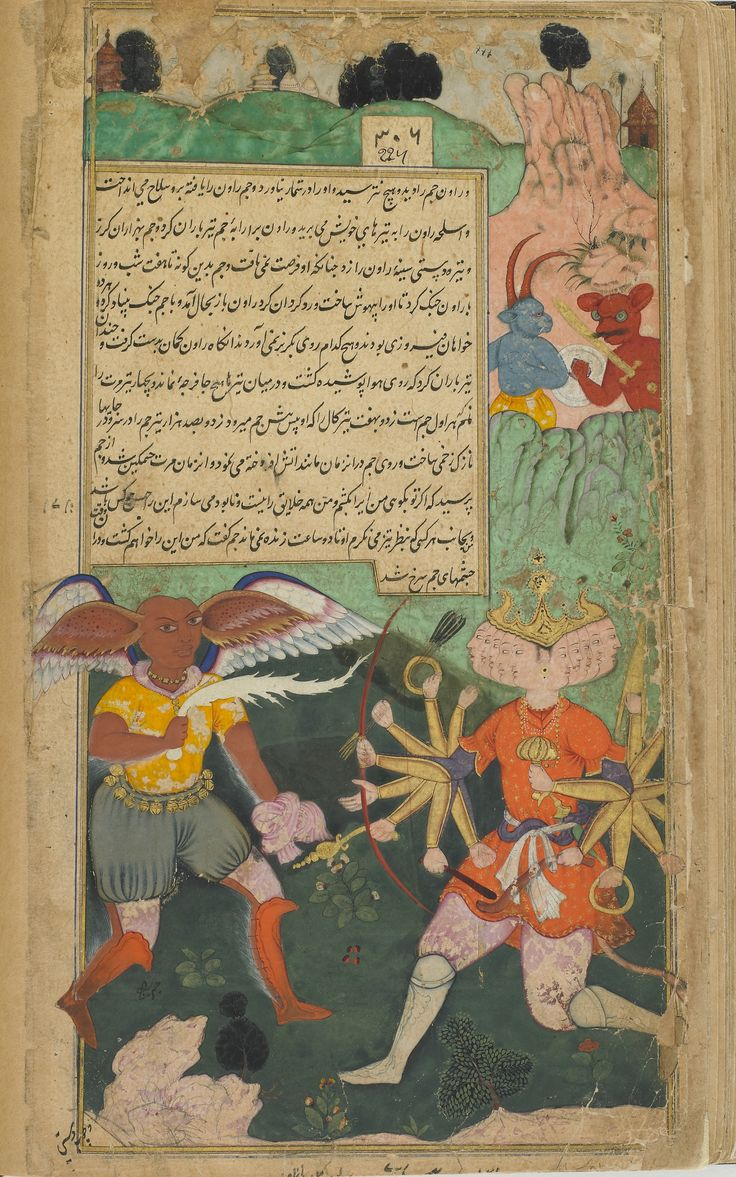
Yama advances to smite Ravana with the weapon of death i.e. Kaladanda

- Brahmadanda - The rod of Brahma (also known as Meru-danda). The Brahmadanda is capable of nullifying the effects of any divine weapon, no matter how destructive. If hurled, the impact of this weapon is excruciatingly lethal to even the celestials.
- Kaladanda - the staff of Death is a special and lethal club used by the God Yama or God of Naraka or Hell in Hinduism. It was the ultimate weapon; once fired it would kill anybody before it no matter what boons he had to protect himself.
- Kankaalam - The deadly Pounder weapons that are wielded by demons
- Kankanam - Weapons that are wielded by demons, Rod for the elimination of those very demons.
- Kapaalam - Weapons that are wielded by demons, Rod for the elimination of those very demons
- Khaṭvāṅga - In Hinduism, the god Shiva - Rudra carried the khatvāṅga as a staff weapon and are thus referred to as khatvāṅgīs.
- Saunanda - The mushala (cylindrical rod), weapon of Balaram.

Gada

- Ekasha Gada - The mace of Lord Shiva. A blow from the weapon is the equivalent of being hit by a million elephants.
- Shooradharam - the main weapon of the Hindu monkey god Hanuman, son of Añjanā.
- Kaumodaki - Kaumodaki is the gada (mace) of the Hindu god Vishnu
- Mace of Bhima - It was presented by Mayasura. It was used by Danavas King Vrishaparva.
- Modaki Mace - The Beater mace
- Shibika (a club) - The weapon of Kubera, god of wealth.
- Shikhari Mace - The tower of Protection mace

Khaḍga

- Aruval - Tamils revere the weapon, a type of billhook, as a symbol of Karupannar. (Tamil history)
- Asi (also Sword of Drona) - a legendary sword in Hinduism.
- Chandrahas - Sword of Lord Shiva. The divine sword Chandrahas (literally the laughter of the moon but referring to the shape formed by a crescent moon which resembles a smile) was given to Ravana by Lord Shiva, who was pleased by Ravana's intense devotion. Ravana gave this sword to Indrajit on different occasions especially to fight against Devas.
- Girish - A special sword of Shiva with unique characteristics.
- Indra Kaakam - The sword of Indra; having a crescent shaped tip.
- Khanda - The khanda is a symbol of Shiva. Khanda often appears in Hindu, Buddhist and Sikh scriptures and art.
- Kharga - The Sword of Kali, which slaughters demons indiscriminately and without mercy.
- Nandaka - Is the sword of the Hindu god, Vishnu.
- Nistrimsha - The sword of Pradyumna, son of Krishna.
- Pattayudha - The divine sword of Lord Virabhadra, commander of Lord Shiva's Armies.

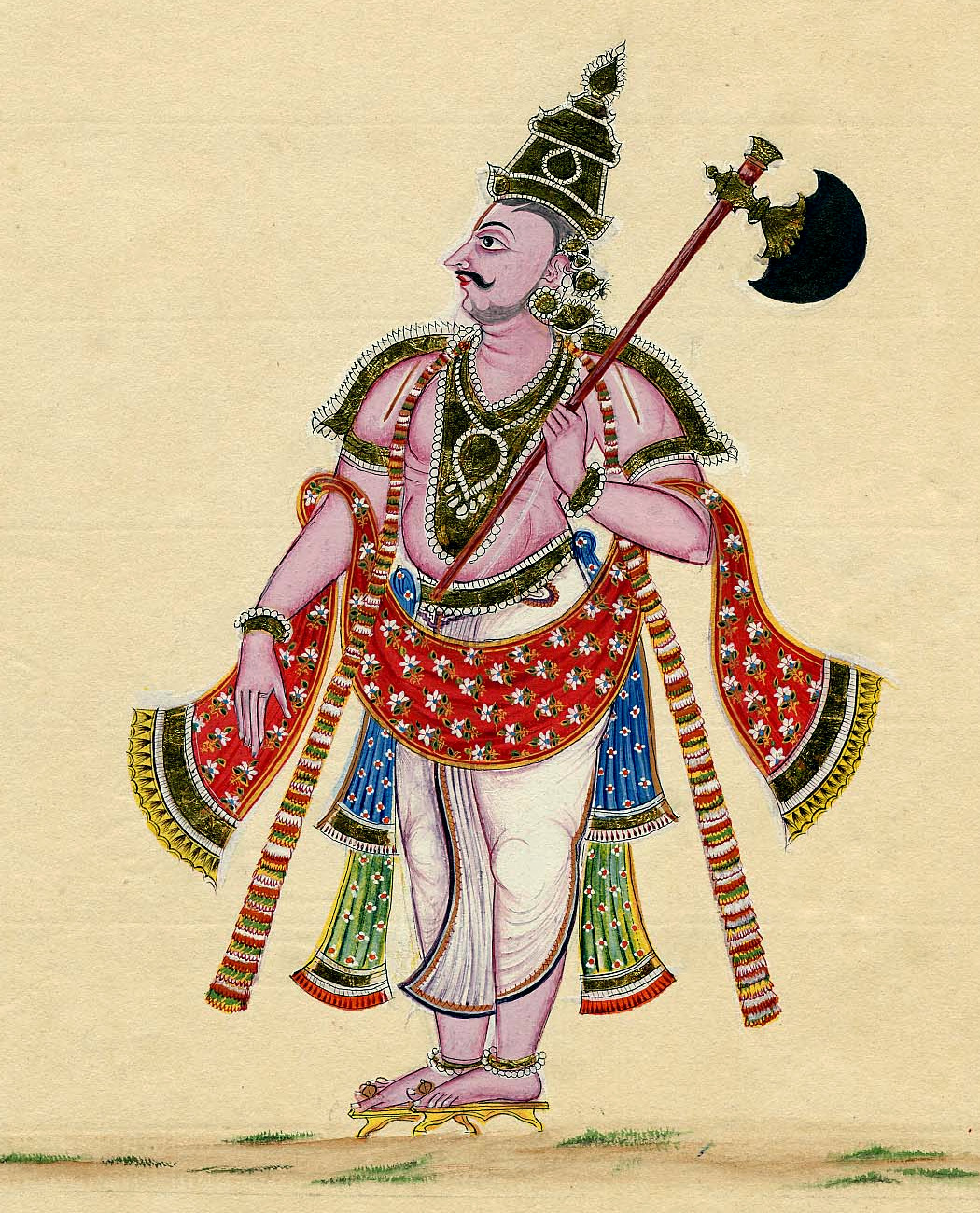
Parashurama holding Axe

Parashu

- Parashu - The parashu is an Indian battle-axe. It is generally wielded with two hands but could also be used with only one. It is depicted as the primary weapon of Parashurama (the 6th Avatar of Lord Vishnu).
- Sakthi - A Hatchet-like weapon, seen in Ganesha's iconography.
- Tanka - The axe of Indra, God of thunder.

Pasha

- Dharma Paasha - The pasha of Lord Dharma.
- Ganesha Paasha - The pasha of Ganesha.
- Kaala Paasha - The pasha of Time.
- Naga Pasha - Pasha of The Nagas. Upon impact, this weapon would bind the target in the coils of living venomous snakes.
- Shiva Parham - A long noose (of Shiva) from which even the Gods can't escape from.
- Varuna Paasha - Pasha of Varuna, god of water. Can hook any beings be they Deva, Asura or human. Impossible to escape from the hook of this weapon.
- Yama Paasha - Pasha of Yama, god of death. It arrests and plucks out the life force of any living being. Except for the Trimurti's, no being can escape from this weapon.

Shula

- Vel - Vel is a divine javelin (spear) associated with the Hindu war god Murugan. It is foremost of all weapons in Hinduism. Adi shakti herself turned to vel and rested in hands of Murugan when he was about to encounter Surapadman, the mightiest of all demons. No astra or weapon is its equal as it adishakti herself who is power source of all Hindu gods.
- Jayantha Vel - A spear which contains the power of the third eye of Lord Shiva.
- Trident of Madhu - It was given as a boon by Shiva to Madhu, a Rakshasa. Then he gave it to his son Lavanasura. It was a very powerful weapon. It destroys anyone who directly fights with its master.
- Trishula - The trident of Shiva, stylized by some as used as a missile weapon and often included a crossed stabilizer to facilitate flight when thrown. Considered to be the most powerful weapon.

=== Astra ===
Kameshwarastra: Used by Sri Lalita Tripurasundari to annihilate Bhandasura

Astra

- Agneyastra - The weapon discharged would emit flames inextinguishable through normal means.
- Astra (Sanskrit: अस्त्र) is a supernatural weapon, presided over by a specific deity. Later it came to denote any weapon which was used by releasing it from one's hand (e.g. an arrow, compared to keeping it one's hand e.g. a sword {shastra}). The bearer of the weapon is called Astradhari (Sanskrit: अस्त्रधारी).
- Brahmanda Astra - It is said in the epic Mahabharata that the weapon manifests with the all five heads of Lord Brahma as its tip. Brahma earlier lost his fifth head when he fought with Lord Shiva. This weapon is said to possess the power to destroy entire solar system or Brahmand, the 14 realms according to Hindu cosmology.
- Brahmashirsha Astra - It is thought that the Brahmashirsha Astra is the evolution of the Brahmastra, and 4 times stronger than Brahmastra. The weapon manifests with the four heads of Lord Brahma as its tip. When it strikes an area it will cause complete destruction and nothing will grow not even a blade of grass, for the next 12 Brahma years (1 Brahma year = 3,110,400,000,000 Human year. It will not rain for 12 Brahma years in that area, and everything including metal and earth become poisoned.
- Brahmastra - Described in a number of the Puranas, it was considered one of the deadliest weapons, which can even destroy the world. It was said that when the Brahmastra was discharged, it was impossible to stop it until and unless you have its counterattack astra.
- Aindrastra (Indraastra)- Would bring about a rain of arrows from the sky.
- Narayanastra - The personal missile of Vishnu in his Narayana or Naraina form.
- Pashupatastra - An irresistible destructive personal weapon of Shiva and Kali, discharged by the mind, the eyes, words, or a bow.
- Samvarta Astra - Weapon belonging to Yama. Used by Emperor Bharata to annihilate thirty million gandharvas in a moment, tearing them to pieces.
- Vaishnavastra - The most powerful weapon of Lord Vishnu - capable of destroying hurled against anything. It is fastest astra. Both vaishnavastra and narayanastra are same but narayanastra can hit many targets this is for single target.
- Varunastra - A water weapon (a storm) according to the Indian scriptures, incepted by Varuna. In stories it is said to assume any weapon's shape, just like water. This weapon is commonly mentioned as being used to counter the Agneyastra.

Dhanush and Shara

- Ājagava - The bow of Rājā Māndātā and Pŗthu (see Pinaka).
- Arrow of Brahma - The arrow given by the sage Agastya to Rama (seventh avatar of Vishnu) and was used to kill Ravana.
- Arrow of Shiva - It can destroy creation. Returns to the quiver after being used.
- Gandiva - created by Brahma and given by Varuna to Arjuna on Agni's request and used by Arjuna in Mahabharat. Gandiva has 108 divine strings.
- Govardhana - A powerful bow of Vishnu. During the Mahabharata, Vishnu gave Vidura this bow.
- Indra's dart (also Vasavi Shakti) - Vasavi Shakti was used by Karna against Ghatotkacha in the Mahabharata War.
- Kaundinya's bow - A magic bow wielded by the Brahman Kaundinya I, who used it to make the Nāga princess Soma fall in love with him. (Funan)
- Kodandam - Rama's bow.
- Pinaka or (Shiva's bow), also called Ājagava - The great bow of Shiva, arrows fired from the bow could not be intercepted.
- Vijaya Dhanush (also Shiv Dhanush) - Karna possessed this bow which was given by Lord Parashurama. It is considered to be foremost among the bows in Hindu mythology as it was personally created using Lord Shiva's energy.
- Pushpa Dhanu - The bow of Kama, God of love; made of sugarcane with a string of honeybees.
- Pushpa Shar - The floral arrows of Kama
- Sharanga - the bow of the Hindu God Vishnu
- Sharkha - The bow of Krishna, 8th avatar of Vishnu.
- Teen Baan - Shiva gave Barbarika three infallible arrows (Teen Baan). A single arrow was enough to destroy all opponents in any war, and it would then return to Barbarika's quiver.

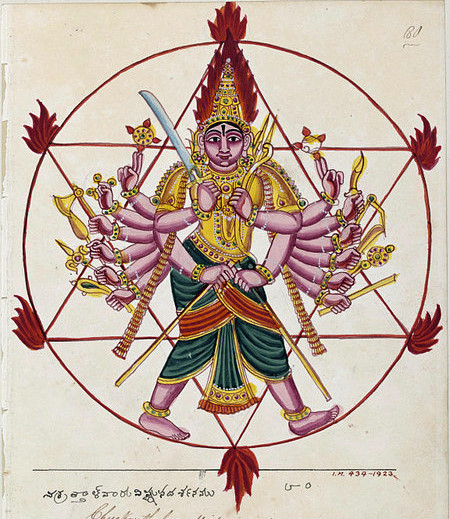
chakra as ayudhapurusha. Personification of the chakra (discus) of Vishnu

Chakra

- Danda Chakra - The punisher chakra.
- Dharma Chakra - The virtue chakra.
- Indra Chakra - The chakra of Indra
- Kaal Chakra - The Time chakra, renders the enemy in a piteous state; full with magical powers.
- Maheshwara Chakra - The Chakra of Lord Shiva.
- Sudarshana Chakra - The legendary discus of Vishnu, which cannot be stopped by anyone, except by Lord Vishnu and Lord Shiva. It has tremendous occult and spiritual powers, by which it is able to destroy anything. not effective against Karna's shield.
- Vishnu Chakra - It first sparkles with cosmic radiance, revolves with one lakh revolutions per foot.

Vajra

- Shiva Vajra - A vajra 100 times more powerful than Indra's Vajra
- Indra's Thunderbolt - A lightning thunderbolt wielded by Indra, called vajra.

== Miscellaneous ==
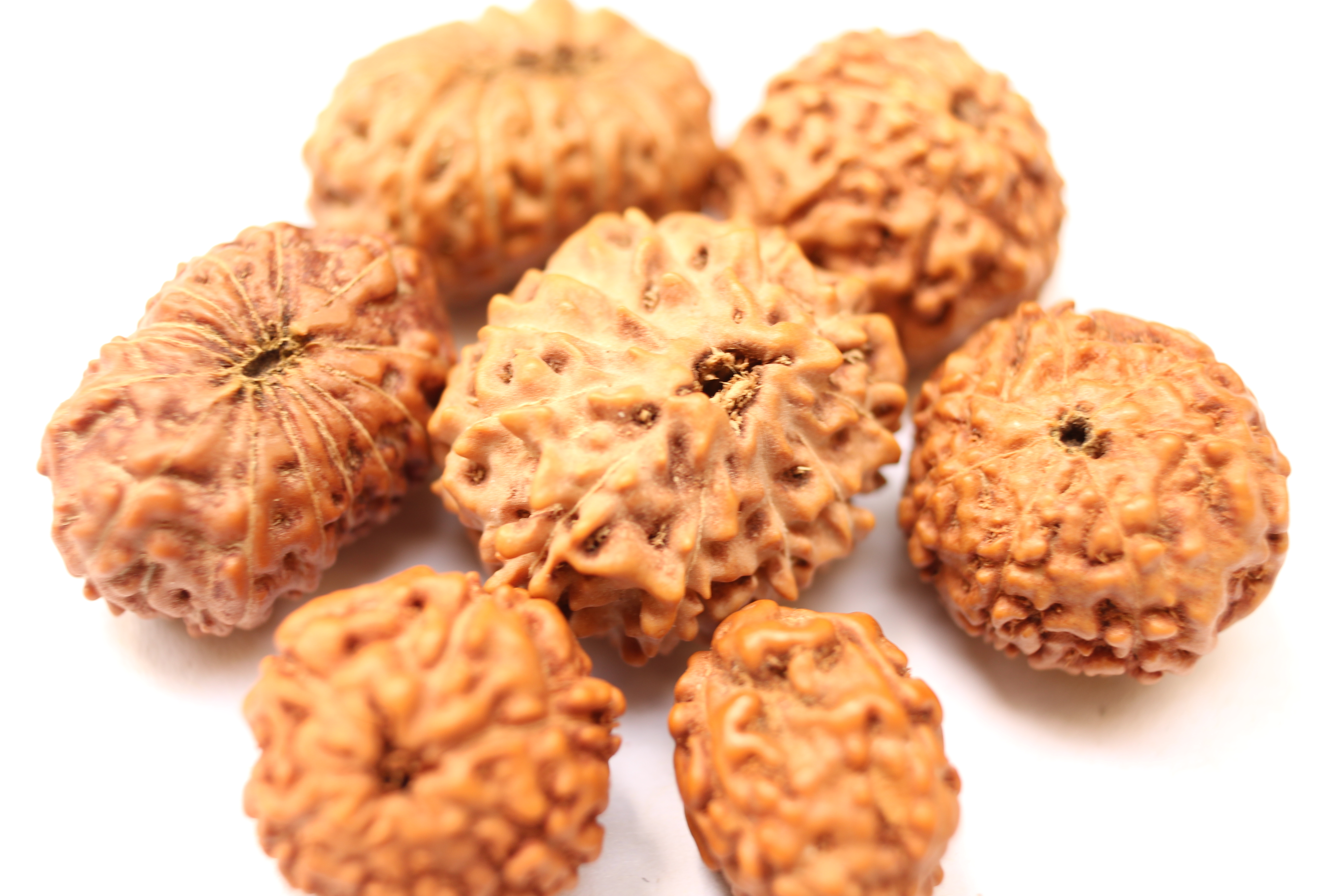
Rudraksha Beads

- Ashtamangala - The Aṣṭamaṅgala are a sacred suite of Eight Auspicious Symbols.
- Chhatra - An umbrella, according to Hinduism, is the emblem of Varuna. A number of deities are depicted with chatra, and they include Revanta, Surya, and Vamana (the 5th avatar of Vishnu).
- The Dharmachakra (IAST: dharmacakra; Pali dhammacakka; "Wheel of the Dharma"), is one of the Ashtamangala.
- Devi-Gola of the Hindus, balls which are supposed to fall from the gods or the heavens. Most likely meteors.
- Hiranyagarbha (World egg) - The source of the creation of the universe or the manifested.
- Prana - All the cosmic energy, permeating the Universe on all levels. Prana is often referred to as the "life force" or "life energy". It also includes energies present in inanimate objects.
- Rama Setu In the Ramayana, the vanaras named Nala and Nila construct a floating bridge (known as Rama Setu) across the sea, using stones that floated on water because they had Rama's name written on them.
- Rudraksha, also rudraksh, ("Rudra's/Shiva's Teardrops"), is a seed traditionally used for prayer beads in Hinduism.
- Stambha (also spelled as Skambha) - In the context of Hinduism, is believed to be a cosmic column. It is believed that the stambha functions as a bond, which joins the heaven (Svarga) and the earth (prithvi).
- Vedic amulet - In Vedic literature, fig trees often represent talismans with the udumbara fig tree having been deemed the "lord of amulets".
- Wheel of time (also known as Kalachakra) is a concept found in several religious traditions and philosophies, notably religions of Indian origin such as Hinduism, Sikhism, and Buddhism, which regard time as cyclical and consisting of repeating ages.

== See also ==
- List of mythological objects
- List of legendary creatures in Hinduism
