= Barchi =

Barchi is a surname. Notable people with the surname include:

- Fabrizio Barchi (born 1957), Italian choir conductor
- Robert L. Barchi (born 1946), American academic, physician and scientist

== See also ==
- Barchi, Marche, a city in the province of Pesaro e Urbino (Italy)
- Barchi (lance), a type of lance
- Borchi, another surname
- Barcha (surname), another surname
