= First principle =

Basic proposition or assumption

In philosophy and science, a first principle is a basic proposition or assumption that cannot be deduced from any other proposition or assumption. First principles in philosophy are from first cause attitudes and taught by Aristotelians, and nuanced versions of first principles are referred to as postulates by Kantians.

In mathematics and formal logic, first principles are referred to as axioms or postulates. In physics and other sciences, theoretical work is said to be from first principles, or ab initio, if it starts directly at the level of established science and does not make assumptions such as empirical model and parameter fitting. "First principles thinking" consists of decomposing things down to the fundamental axioms in the given arena, before reasoning up by asking which ones are relevant to the question at hand, then cross-referencing conclusions based on chosen axioms and making sure conclusions do not violate any fundamental laws. Physicists include counterintuitive concepts with reiteration.

== In formal logic ==
In a formal logical system—that is, a set of propositions that are consistent with one another—it is possible that some of the statements can be deduced from other statements. For example, in the syllogism, "All men are mortal; Socrates is a man; Socrates is mortal" the last claim can be deduced from the first two.

A first principle is an axiom that cannot be deduced from any other within that system. The classic example is that of Euclid's Elements; its hundreds of geometric propositions can be deduced from a set of definitions, postulates, and primitive notions: all three types constitute first principles.

== Philosophy ==
In philosophy, "first principles" are from first cause attitudes commonly referred to as a priori terms and arguments, which are contrasted to a posteriori terms, reasoning, or arguments, in that the former are simply assumed and exist prior to the reasoning process, and the latter are deduced or inferred after the initial reasoning process. First principles are generally treated in the realm of philosophy known as epistemology but are an important factor in any metaphysical speculation.

In philosophy, "first principles" are often somewhat synonymous with a priori, datum, and axiomatic reasoning.

=== Ancient Greek philosophy ===
In ancient Greek philosophy, a first principle from which other principles are derived is called an arche (Note: ἐξ ἀρχῆς λόγος:) and later "first principle" or "element". By extension, it may mean "first place", "method of government", "empire", "realm" or "authorities". (Note: in plural: ἀρχαί) The concept of an arche was adapted from the earliest cosmogonies of Hesiod and Orphism, through the physical theories of Pre-Socratic philosophy and Plato before being formalized as a part of metaphysics by Aristotle. Arche, (Note: /ˈɑːrki/Ancient Greek: ἀρχή) sometimes also transcribed as arkhé, is an Ancient Greek word with primary senses "beginning", "origin" or "source of action", (Note: ἐξ ἀρχῆς) from the beginning, or the original argument, "command". The first principle or element corresponds to the "ultimate underlying substance" and "ultimate indemonstrable principle".

==== Mythical cosmogonies ====
The heritage of Greek mythology already embodied the desire to articulate reality as a whole and this universalizing impulse was fundamental for the first projects of speculative theorizing. It appears that the order of "being" was first imaginatively visualized before it was abstractly thought.

In the mythological cosmogonies of the Near East, the universe is formless and empty and the only existing thing prior to creation was the water abyss. In the Babylonian creation story, Enuma Elish, the primordial world is described as a "watery chaos" from which everything else appeared. This watery chaos has similarities in the cosmogony of the Greek mythographer Pherecydes of Syros. In the mythical Greek cosmogony of Hesiod (8th to 7th century BC), the origin of the world is Chaos, considered as a divine primordial condition, from which everything else appeared. In the creation "chaos" is a gaping-void, but later the word is used to describe the space between the Earth and the sky, after their separation. "Chaos" may mean infinite space, or a formless matter which can be differentiated. The notion of temporal infinity was familiar to the Greek mind from remote antiquity in the religious conception of immortality. The conception of the "divine" as an origin influenced the first Greek philosophers. In the Orphic cosmogony, the unaging Chronos produced Aether and Chaos and made in divine Aether a silvery egg, from which everything else appeared.

==== Ionian school ====
A usual belief when analysing the earliest Pre-Socratic philosophers, is that the Ionians were material monists, and sought to explain all of nature (physis) in terms of one unifying arche. Among the material monists were the three Milesian philosophers: Thales, who believed that everything was composed of water; Anaximander, who believed it was apeiron; and Anaximenes, who believed it was air. This is considered as a permanent substance or either one or more which is conserved in the generation of rest of it. From this all things first come to be and into this they are resolved in a final state. This source of entity is always preserved. This interpretation, however, is disputed, the focus of the Milesians of believing that all was composed of one element is possibly an anachronism by Aristotle, which influenced later sources. Their focus on their elemental use is not clear even today. Although their theories were primitive, these philosophers were the first to give an explanation of the physical world without referencing the supernatural; this opened the way for much of modern science (and philosophy), which has the same goal of explaining the world without dependence on the supernatural.

Thales of Miletus (7th to 6th century BC), known as "the father of philosophy", claimed that the first principle of all things is water, and considered it as a substance that contains in it motion and change. His theory was supported by the observation of moisture throughout the world and coincided with his theory that the Earth floated on water. His ideas were influenced by the Near-Eastern mythological cosmogony and probably by the Homeric statement that the surrounding Oceanus (ocean) is the source of all springs and rivers.

Anaximander argued that water could not be the arche, because it could not give rise to its opposite, fire. Anaximander claimed that none of the elements (earth, fire, air, water) could be arche for the same reason. Instead, he proposed the existence of the apeiron, an indefinite substance from which all things are born and to which all things will return. Apeiron (endless or boundless) is something completely indefinite; and Anaximander was probably influenced by the original chaos of Hesiod (yawning abyss).

Anaximander was the first philosopher to use arche for that which writers from Aristotle onwards called "the substratum" (Simplicius Phys. 150, 22). He probably intended it to mean primarily "indefinite in kind" but assumed it also to be "of unlimited extent and duration". The notion of temporal infinity was familiar to the Greek mind from remote antiquity in the religious conception of immortality and Anaximander's description was in terms appropriate to this conception. This arche is called "eternal and ageless". (Hippolitus I,6, I;DK B2)

Anaximenes, Anaximander's pupil, advanced yet another theory. He returns to the elemental theory, but this time posits air, rather than water, as the arche and ascribes to it divine attributes. He was the first recorded philosopher who provided a theory of change and supported it with observation. Using two contrary processes of rarefaction and condensation (thinning or thickening), he explains how air is part of a series of changes. Rarefied air becomes fire, condensed it becomes first wind, then cloud, water, earth, and stone in order. The arche is technically what underlies all of reality/appearances.

==== Aristotle ====
Terence Irwin writes:

When Aristotle explains in general terms what he tries to do in his philosophical works, he says he is looking for "first principles" (or "origins"; archai):

In every systematic inquiry (methodos) where there are first principles, or causes, or elements, knowledge and science result from acquiring knowledge of these; for we think we know something just in case we acquire knowledge of the primary causes, the primary first principles, all the way to the elements. It is clear, then, that in the science of nature as elsewhere, we should try first to determine questions about the first principles. The naturally proper direction of our road is from things better known and clearer to us, to things that are clearer and better known by nature; for the things that are known to us are not the same as the things known unconditionally (haplôs). Hence it is necessary for us to progress, following this procedure, from the things that are less clear by nature, but clearer to us, towards things that are clearer and better known by nature. (Phys. 184a10–21)

The connection between knowledge and first principles is not axiomatic as expressed in Aristotle's account of a first principle (in one sense) as "the first basis from which a thing is known" (Met. 1013a14–15). For Aristotle, the arche is the condition necessary for the existence of something, the basis for what he calls "first philosophy" or metaphysics. The search for first principles is not peculiar to philosophy; philosophy shares this aim with biological, meteorological, and historical inquiries, among others. But Aristotle's references to first principles in this opening passage of the Physics and at the start of other philosophical inquiries imply that it is a primary task of philosophy.

Aristotle himself calls the law of noncontradiction "the most certain of all principles" in Metaphysics Book IV.

=== Modern philosophy ===
==== Descartes ====
Profoundly influenced by Euclid, Descartes was a rationalist who invented the foundationalist system of philosophy. He used the method of doubt, now called Cartesian doubt, to systematically doubt everything he could possibly doubt until he was left with what he saw as purely indubitable truths. Using these self-evident propositions as his axioms, or foundations, he went on to deduce his entire body of knowledge from them. The foundations are also called a priori truths. His most famous proposition is "Je pense, donc je suis" (I think, therefore I am, or Cogito ergo sum), which he indicated in his Discourse on the Method was "the first principle of the philosophy of which I was in search."

Descartes describes the concept of a first principle in the following excerpt from the preface to the Principles of Philosophy (1644):

I should have desired, in the first place, to explain in it what philosophy is, by commencing with the most common matters, as, for example, that the word philosophy signifies the study of wisdom, and that by wisdom is to be understood not merely prudence in the management of affairs, but a perfect knowledge of all that man can know, as well for the conduct of his life as for the preservation of his health and the discovery of all the arts, and that knowledge to subserve these ends must necessarily be deduced from first causes; so that in order to study the acquisition of it (which is properly called [284] philosophizing), we must commence with the investigation of those first causes which are called Principles. Now, these principles must possess two conditions: in the first place, they must be so clear and evident that the human mind, when it attentively considers them, cannot doubt their truth; in the second place, the knowledge of other things must be so dependent on them as that though the principles themselves may indeed be known apart from what depends on them, the latter cannot nevertheless be known apart from the former. It will accordingly be necessary thereafter to endeavor so to deduce from those principles the knowledge of the things that depend on them, as that there may be nothing in the whole series of deductions which is not perfectly manifest.

== In physics ==
In physics, a calculation is said to be from first principles, or ab initio, if it starts directly at the level of established laws of physics and does not make assumptions such as empirical model and fitting parameters.

For example, calculation of electronic structure using the Schrödinger equation within a set of approximations that do not include fitting the model to experimental data is an ab initio approach.

== See also ==
- Abstraction
- Brute fact
- Present
- Clean-room implementation
