= Barcha (surname) =

Barcha is a surname. Notable people with the surname include:

- Mercedes Barcha (1932–2020), Colombian author's wife
- Rodrigo García Barcha (born 1959), Colombian-Mexican television and film director, screenwriter, author, and cinematographer
- Stephan Barcha (born 1989), Brazilian show jumping rider

== See also ==
- Barchas, another surname
- Barchi, another surname
