= Fire (classical element) =

One of the four classical elements

Fire is one of the four classical elements along with earth, water and air in ancient Greek philosophy and science. Fire is considered to be both hot and dry and, according to Plato, is associated with the tetrahedron.

== Greek and Roman tradition ==
Fire is one of the four classical elements in ancient Greek philosophy and science. It was commonly associated with energy, assertiveness, and passion. In one Greek myth, Prometheus stole fire from the gods to protect otherwise helpless humans, but was punished for this act of charity. Platos' Protagoras describes how Epimetheus was tasked with equipping all animals in creation with their proper qualities, whereas Prometheus was to inspect the work, but Epimetheus gave all the best attributes to the "brute beasts", leaving humans with nothing, thus causing Prometheus to steal the flames from Hephaestus. Hesiod's Theogony, however, tells a different version of events: Prometheus had sacrificed a great ox and divided the animal in two portions, setting the meat for men and the white bones glazed in fat for Zeus. Enraged, Zeus took away their ability to make fire, causing Prometheus to steal it back from Olympus.

Fire was one of many archai proposed by the pre-Socratics, most of whom sought to reduce the cosmos, or its creation, to a single substance. Heraclitus (c. 535 BCE – c. 475 BCE) considered fire to be the most fundamental of all elements. He believed fire gave rise to the other three elements: "All things are an interchange for fire, and fire for all things, just like goods for gold and gold for goods." He had a reputation for obscure philosophical principles and for speaking in riddles. He described how fire gave rise to the other elements as the: "upward-downward path", (ὁδὸς ἄνω κάτω), a "hidden harmony" or series of transformations he called the "turnings of fire", (πυρὸς τροπαὶ), first into sea, and half that sea into earth, and half that earth into rarefied air. This concept anticipates both the four classical elements of Empedocles and Aristotle's transmutation of the four elements into one another.

This world, which is the same for all, no one of gods or men has made. But it always was and will be: an ever-living fire, with measures of it kindling, and measures going out.

Heraclitus regarded the soul as being a mixture of fire and water, with fire being the more noble part and water the ignoble aspect. He believed the goal of the soul is to be rid of water and become pure fire: the dry soul is the best and it is worldly pleasures that make the soul "moist". He was known as the "weeping philosopher" and died of hydropsy, a swelling due to abnormal accumulation of fluid beneath the skin.

However, Empedocles of Akragas (c. 495 – c. 435 BCE), is best known for having selected all elements as his archai and by the time of Plato (427–347 BCE), the four Empedoclian elements were well established. In the Timaeus, Plato's major cosmological dialogue, the Platonic solid he associated with fire was the tetrahedron, which is formed from four triangles and contains the least volume with the greatest surface area. This also makes fire the element with the smallest number of sides, and Plato regarded it as appropriate for the heat of fire, which he felt is sharp and stabbing (like one of the points of a tetrahedron).

Plato's student Aristotle (384–322 BCE) did not maintain his former teacher's geometric view of the elements, but rather preferred a somewhat more naturalistic explanation for the elements based on their traditional qualities. Fire, the hot and dry element, like the other elements, was an abstract principle and not identical with the normal solids, liquids, and combustion phenomena we experience:

What we commonly call fire. It is not really fire, for fire is an excess of heat and a sort of ebullition; but in reality, of what we call air, the part surrounding the earth is moist and warm, because it contains both vapour and a dry exhalation from the earth.

According to Aristotle, the four elements rise or fall toward their natural place in concentric layers surrounding the center of the Earth and form the terrestrial or sublunary spheres.

In ancient Greek medicine, each of the four humours became associated with an element. Yellow bile was the humor identified with fire, since both were hot and dry. Other things associated with fire and yellow bile in ancient and medieval medicine included the season of summer, since it increased the qualities of heat and aridity; the choleric temperament (of a person dominated by the yellow bile humour); the masculine; and the eastern point of the compass.

△, the alchemical symbol for fire

In alchemy, the chemical element of sulfur was often associated with fire and its alchemical symbol, and its symbol was an upward-pointing triangle. In alchemic tradition, metals are incubated by fire in the womb of the Earth, and alchemists only accelerate their development.

== Indian tradition ==
Agni is a Hindu and Vedic deity. The word agni is Sanskrit for fire (noun), cognate with Latin ignis (the root of English ignite), Russian огонь (fire), pronounced agon. Agni has three forms: fire, lightning, and the sun.

Agni is one of the most important of the Vedic gods. He is the god of fire and the acceptor of sacrifices. The sacrifices made to Agni go to the deities because Agni is a messenger from and to the other gods. He is ever-young, because the fire is re-lit every day, yet he is also immortal. In Indian tradition, fire is also linked to Surya or the Sun and Mangala or Mars, and with the south-east direction.

Teukāya ekendriya is a name used in Jain tradition which refers to Jīvas said to be reincarnated as fire.

== Ceremonial magic ==
Fire and the other Greek classical elements were incorporated into the Golden Dawn system. Philosophus (4=7) is the elemental grade attributed to fire; this grade is also attributed to the Qabalistic Sephirah Netzach and the planet Venus. The elemental weapon of fire is the Wand. Each of the elements has several associated spiritual beings. The archangel of fire is Michael, the angel is Aral, the ruler is Seraph, the king is Djin, and the fire elementals (following Paracelsus) are called salamanders. Fire is considered to be active; it is represented by the symbol for Leo, and it is referred to the lower right point of the pentacle in the Supreme Invoking Ritual of the Pentacle. Many of these associations have since spread throughout the occult community.

== Tarot ==
Fire in tarot symbolizes conversion or passion. Many references to fire in tarot are related to the usage of fire in the practice of alchemy, in which the application of fire is a prime method of conversion, and everything that touches fire is changed, often beyond recognition. The symbol of fire was a cue pointing to transformation; the chemical variant was the symbol delta, which is also the classical symbol for fire. Conversion symbolized can be good, for example, refining raw crudities to gold, as seen in The Devil. Conversion can also be bad, as in The Tower, symbolizing a downfall due to anger. Fire is associated with the suit of rods/wands, and as such, represents passion from inspiration. As an element, fire has mixed symbolism: it represents energy that can be helpful when controlled but volatile if left unchecked.

== Modern witchcraft ==
Fire is one of the five elements that appear in most Wiccan traditions influenced by the Golden Dawn system of magic, and Aleister Crowley's mysticism, which the Golden Dawn in turn inspired.

== Freemasonry ==
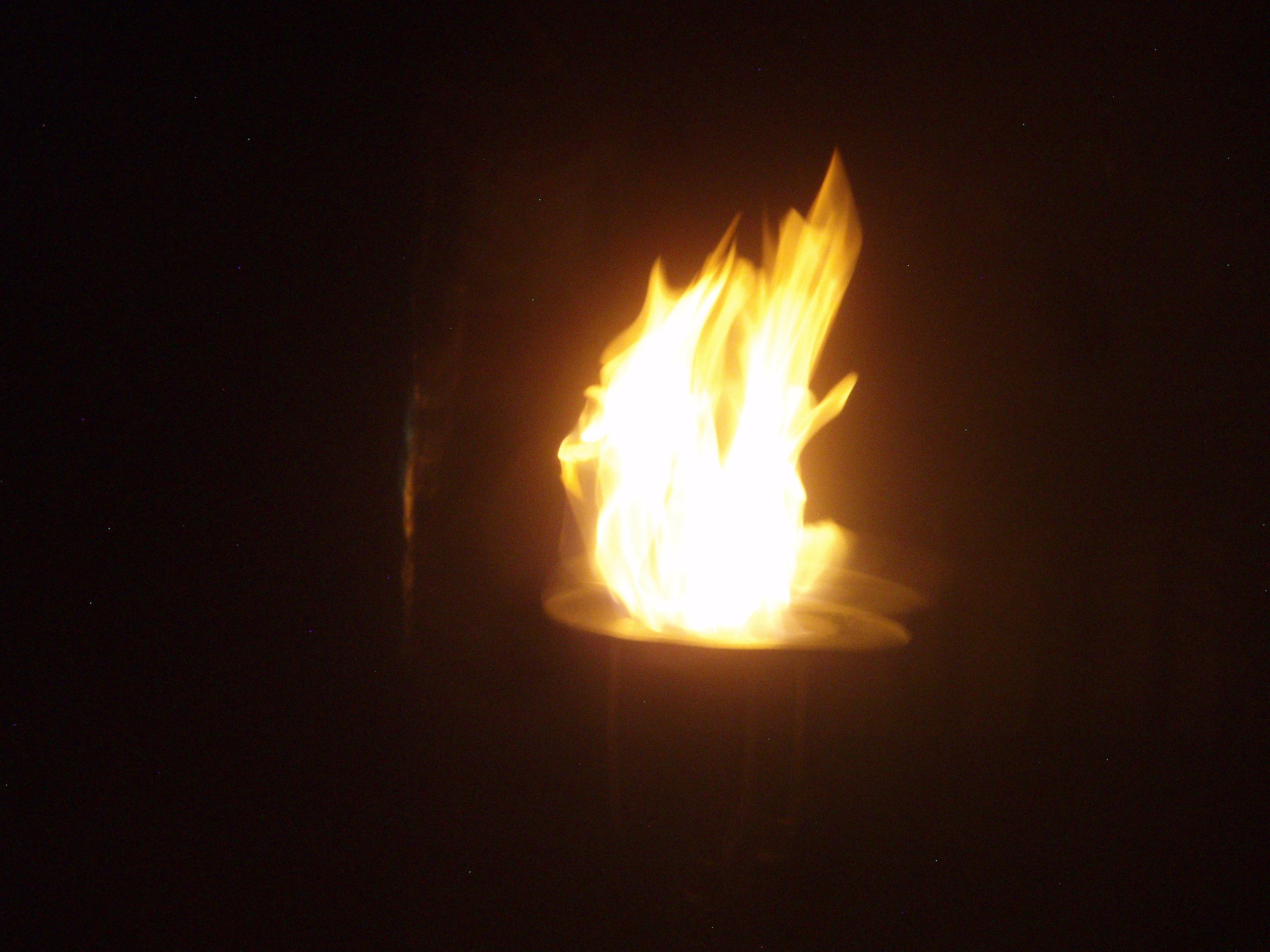
Fire during the winter solstice ceremony (Most Worshipful Grand National Mexican Lodge "Independencia No. 2") at the Tlatelolco Conventions Center (Manuel González 171, col. San Simón Tolnáhuac, del. Cuauhtémoc).

In freemasonry, fire is present, for example, during the ceremony of winter solstice, a symbol also of renaissance and energy. Freemasonry takes the ancient symbolic meaning of fire and recognizes its dual nature: creation and light on the one hand, and destruction and purification on the other.

== See also ==
- Fire
- Fire god
- Fire worship
- Pyrokinesis
- Pyromancy
- Pyromania
- Aries (astrology)
- Leo (astrology)
- Sagittarius (astrology)
