= Air (classical element) =

One of four primary substances in antiquity

Air or Wind is one of the four classical elements along with water, earth and fire in ancient Greek philosophy and in Western alchemy.

== Greek and Roman tradition ==
The four humors and their qualities

According to Plato, it is associated with the octahedron; air is considered to be both hot and wet. The ancient Greeks used two words for air: aer meant the dim lower atmosphere, and aether meant the bright upper atmosphere above the clouds. Plato, for instance writes that "So it is with air: there is the brightest variety which we call aether, the muddiest which we call mist and darkness, and other kinds for which we have no name...." Among the early Greek Pre-Socratic philosophers, Anaximenes (mid-6th century BCE) named air as the arche. A similar belief was attributed by some ancient sources to Diogenes Apolloniates (late 5th century BCE), who also linked air with intelligence and soul (psyche), but other sources claim that his arche was a substance between air and fire. Aristophanes parodied such teachings in his play The Clouds by putting a prayer to air in the mouth of Socrates.

Air was one of many archai proposed by the Pre-socratics, most of whom tried to reduce all things to a single substance. However, Empedocles of Acragas (c. 495-c. 435 BCE) selected four archai for his four roots: air, fire, water, and earth. Ancient and modern opinions differ as to whether he identified air by the divine name Hera, Aidoneus or even Zeus. Empedocles’ roots became the four classical elements of Greek philosophy. Plato (427–347 BCE) took over the four elements of Empedocles. In the Timaeus, his major cosmological dialogue, the Platonic solid associated with air is the octahedron which is formed from eight equilateral triangles. This places air between fire and water which Plato regarded as appropriate because it is intermediate in its mobility, sharpness, and ability to penetrate. He also said of air that its minuscule components are so smooth that one can barely feel them.

Plato's student Aristotle (384–322 BCE) developed a different explanation for the elements based on pairs of qualities. The four elements were arranged concentrically around the center of the universe to form the sublunary sphere. According to Aristotle, air is both hot and wet and occupies a place between fire and water among the elemental spheres. Aristotle definitively separated air from aether. For him, aether was an unchanging, almost divine substance that was found only in the heavens, where it formed celestial spheres.

=== Humorism and temperaments ===
Humour	Season	Ages	Element	Organ	Qualities	Temperament
Blood	spring	infancy	air	liver	moist and warm	sanguine
Yellow bile	summer	youth	fire	gallbladder	warm and dry	choleric
Black bile	autumn	adulthood	earth	spleen	dry and cold	melancholic
Phlegm	winter	old age	water	brain/lungs	cold and moist	phlegmatic

In ancient Greek medicine, each of the four humours became associated with an element. Blood was the humor identified with air, since both were hot and wet. Other things associated with air and blood in ancient and medieval medicine included the season of spring, since it increased the qualities of heat and moisture; the sanguine temperament (of a person dominated by the blood humour); hermaphrodite (combining the masculine quality of heat with the feminine quality of moisture); and the northern point of the compass.

=== Alchemy ===
🜁, the alchemical symbol for air

The alchemical symbol for air is an upward-pointing triangle, bisected by a horizontal line.

== Modern reception ==
The Hermetic Order of the Golden Dawn, founded in 1888, incorporates air and the other Greek classical elements into its teachings. The elemental weapon of air is the dagger which must be painted yellow with magical names and sigils written upon it in violet. Each of the elements has several associated spiritual beings. The archangel of air is Raphael, the angel is Chassan, the ruler is Ariel, the king is Paralda, and the air elementals (following Paracelsus) are called sylphs. Air is considerable and it is referred to the upper left point of the pentagram in the Supreme Invoking Ritual of the Pentagram. Many of these associations have since spread throughout the occult community.

In the Golden Dawn and many other magical systems, each element is associated with one of the cardinal points and is placed under the care of guardian Watchtowers. The Watchtowers derive from the Enochian system of magic founded by Dee. In the Golden Dawn, they are represented by the Enochian elemental tablets. Air is associated with the east, which is guarded by the First Watchtower.

Air is one of the five elements that appear in most Wiccan and Pagan traditions. Wicca in particular was influenced by the Golden Dawn system of magic and Aleister Crowley's mysticism.

== In China ==
The element air, corresponds to the element Wind in Chinese cosmological medicine and Chinese Buddhism as both these traditions have been influenced by what is traditionally called the early Heaven arrangements of ancient philosophical works, such as the I Ching , or the Bagua and their applications.

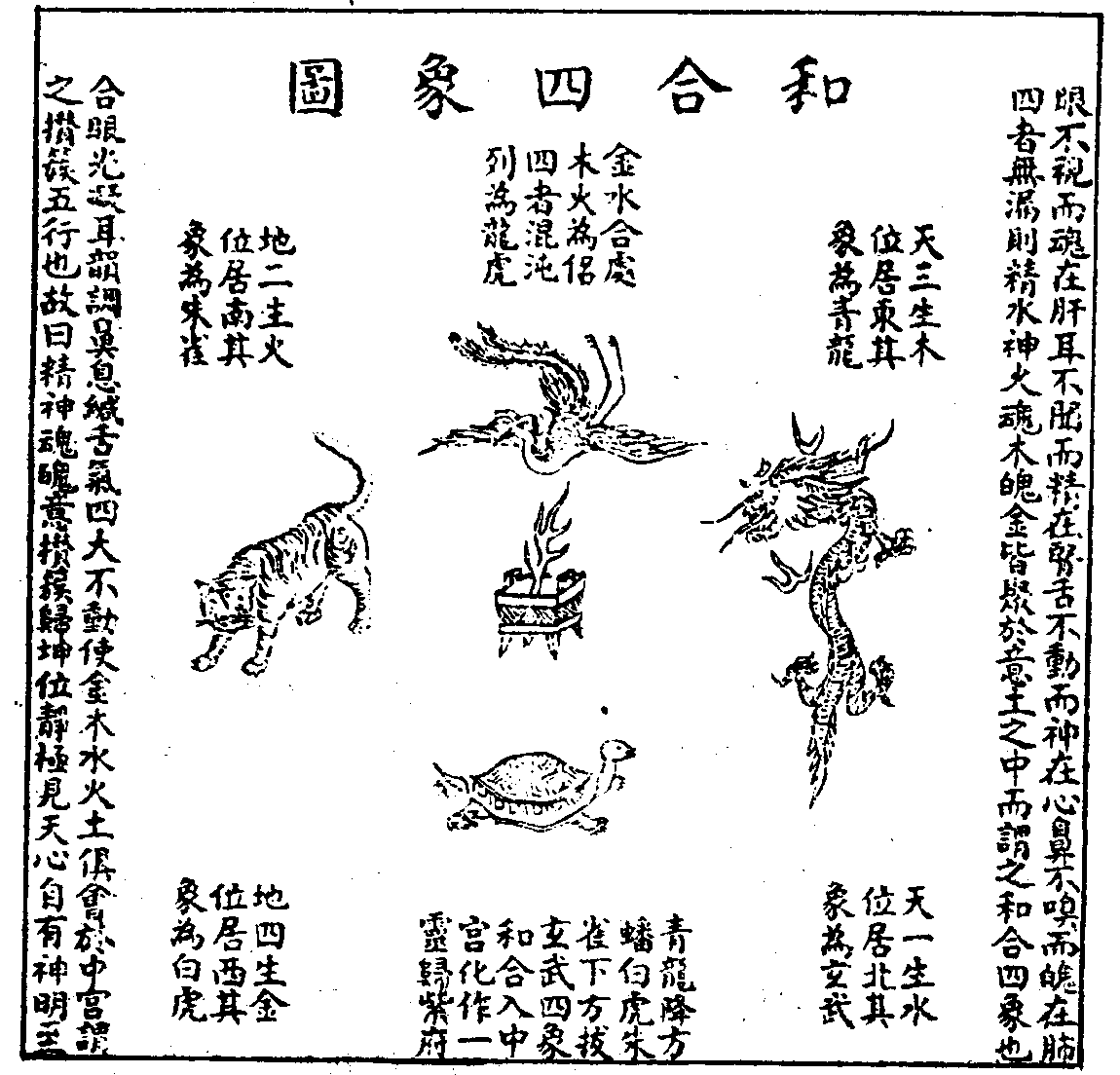
Neidan Illustration of Bringing Together the Four Symbols 和合四象圖, 1615 Xingming guizhi

Many mistakenly have equated the element of air with the latter heaven arrangement of the Wuxing philosophy therefore the element of metal, others with wood (Xùn 巽) due to the elemental association of wind.

== In India ==
Air (Sanskrit: vāyu) is recognized in Indian Buddhism as one of the mahābhūta. According to the Abhidhammattha Sangaha:

The air element (vāyodhātu) is the principle of motion and pressure. Its characteristic is distension (vitthambana), its function is to cause motion in the other material phenomena, and it is manifested as conveyance to other places. Its proximate cause is the other three great essentials. It is experienced as tangible pressure.

=== In Jainism ===
According to Jain beliefs, the element air is inhabited by one-sensed beings or spirits called vāyukāya ekendriya, sometimes said to inhabit various kinds of winds such as whirlwinds, cyclones, monsoons, west winds and trade winds. Prior to reincarnating into another lifeform, spirits can remain as vāyukāya ekendriya from anywhere between one instant to up to three-thousand years, depending on the karma of the spirits.

== In Ancient Egypt ==
Enlil was the god of air in ancient Sumer. Shu was the ancient Egyptian deity of air and the husband of Tefnut, goddess of moisture. He became an emblem of strength by virtue of his role in separating Nut from Geb. Shu played a primary role in the Coffin Texts, which were spells intended to help the deceased reach the realm of the afterlife safely. On the way to the sky, the spirit had to travel through the air as one spell indicates: "I have gone up in Shu, I have climbed on the sunbeams."

== See also ==
- Atmosphere of Earth
- Sky deity
- Wind deity
- Gemini (astrology)
- Aquarius (astrology)
- Libra (astrology)
