= Sublunary sphere =

Region in the geocentric cosmos below the Moon

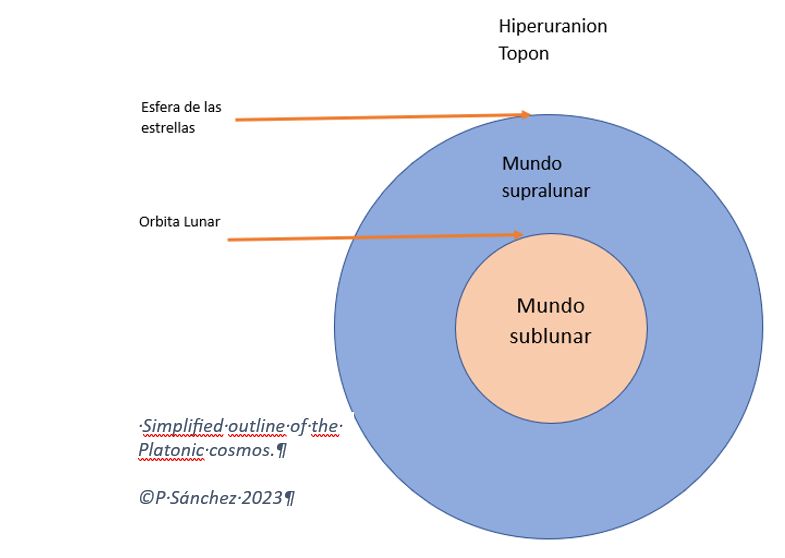
Simplified outline of the sublunary sphere

In Aristotelian physics and Greek astronomy, the sublunary sphere is the region of the geocentric cosmos below the Moon, consisting of the four classical elements: earth, water, air, and fire.

The sublunary sphere was the realm of changing nature. Beginning with the Moon, up to the limits of the universe, everything (to classical astronomy) was permanent, regular and unchanging—the region of aether where the planets and stars are located. Only in the sublunary sphere did the powers of physics hold sway.

== Evolution of concept ==
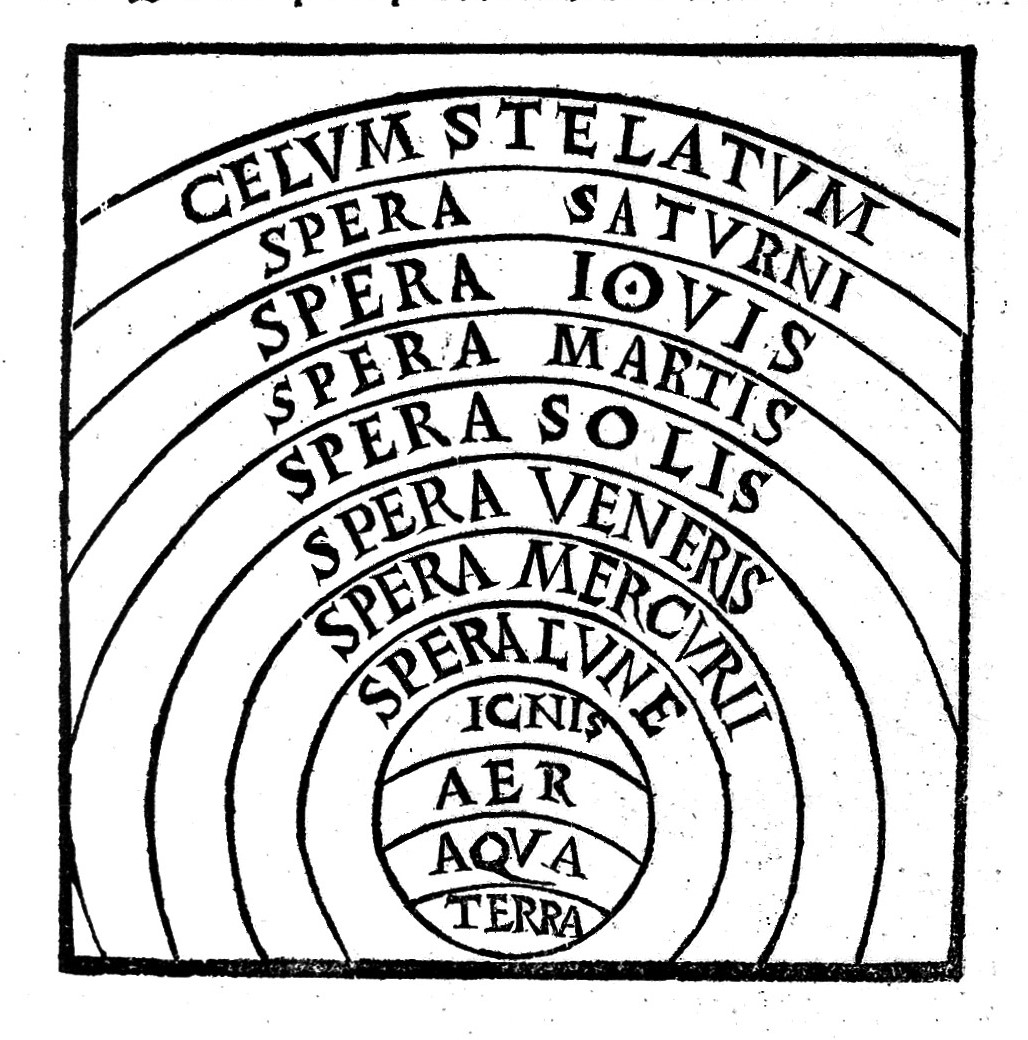
The seven heavens and the sublunar spheres, from an engraving of Albertus Magnus' Philosophia naturalis

Plato and Aristotle helped to formulate the original theory of a sublunary sphere in antiquity, the idea usually going hand in hand with geocentrism and the concept of a spherical Earth.

Avicenna carried forward into the Middle Ages the Aristotelian idea of generation and corruption being limited to the sublunary sphere. Medieval scholastics like Thomas Aquinas, who charted the division between celestial and sublunary spheres in his work Summa Theologica, also drew on Cicero and Lucan for an awareness of the great frontier between Nature and Sky, sublunary and aetheric spheres. The result for medieval/Renaissance mentalities was a pervasive awareness of the existence, at the Moon, of what C. S. Lewis called "this 'great divide' ... from aether to air, from 'heaven' to 'nature', from the realm of gods (or angels) to that of daemons, from the realm of necessity to that of contingence, from the incorruptible to the corruptible".

However, the theories of Copernicus began to challenge the sublunary/aether distinction. In their wake, Tycho Brahe's observations of a new star (nova) and of comets in the supposedly unchanging heavens further undermined the Aristotelian view. Thomas Kuhn saw scientists' new ability to see change in the 'incorruptible' heavens as a classic example of the new possibilities opened up by a paradigm shift.

== Literary offshoots ==
Dante envisaged Mt. Purgatory as being so high that it reached above the sublunary sphere, so that "These slopes are free from every natural change".

Samuel Johnson praised Shakespeare's plays as "exhibiting the real state of sublunary nature, which partakes of good and evil, joy and sorrow, intermingled".

== See also ==
- Celestial spheres
- Firmament
- Sphere of fire
- Unmoved mover
