= Coro Musicanova =

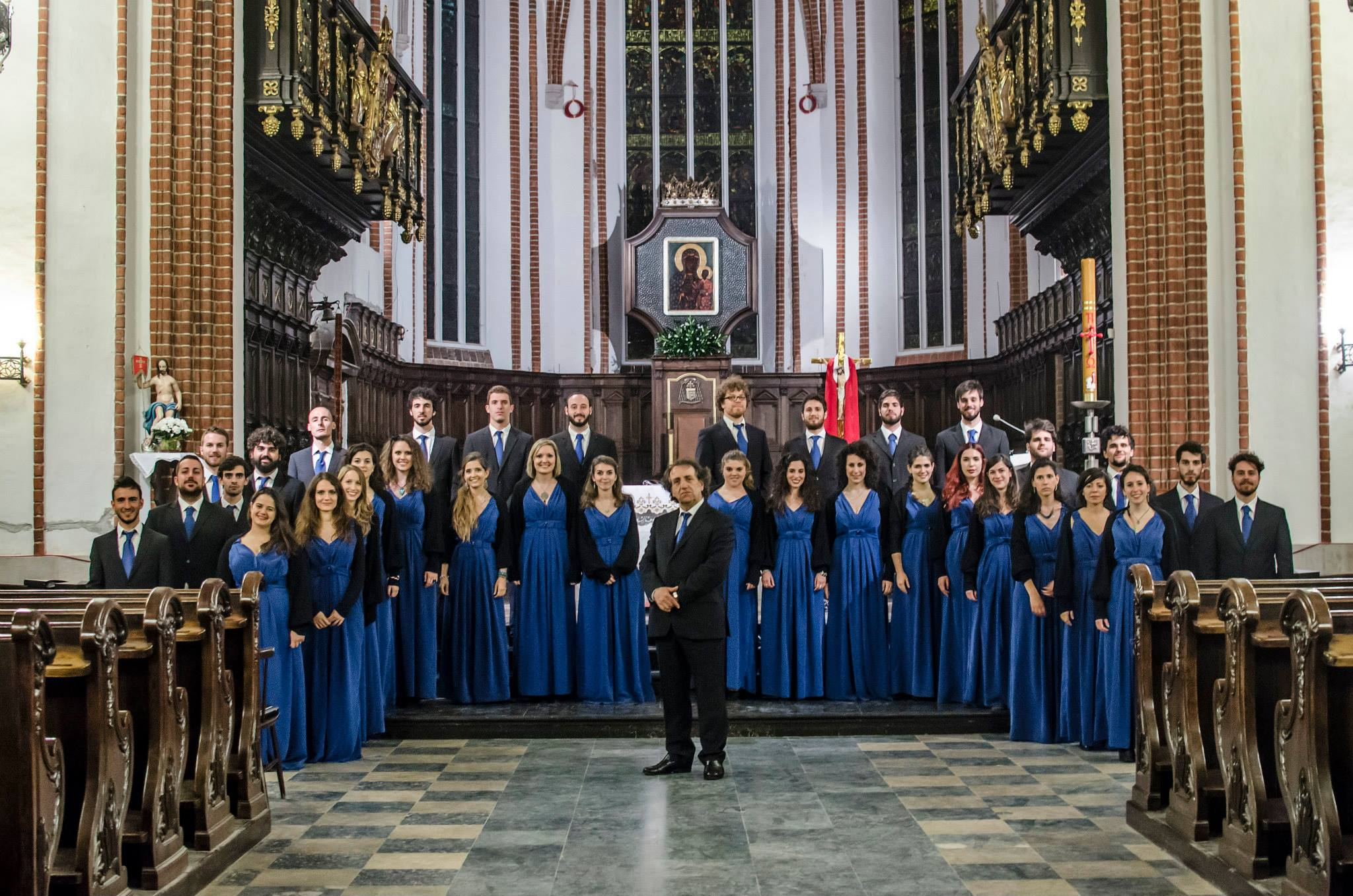
Coro Musicanova

Coro Musicanova (Musicanova Choir) is an Italian polyphonic choir from Rome conducted by maestro Fabrizio Barchi.

== Profile ==
Musicanova was formed in 1999, as a consolidation of the activity by the San Filippo youth choir. The choir has collaborated with composers such as Ennio Morricone, Leo Brouwer and Marco Frisina, and with the Italian pop stars Andrea Bocelli and Mina.

In 2017 Coro Musicanova won the Grand Prix of the 46th Florilège Vocal de Tours, gaining access to the 2018 edition of the European Grand Prix for Choral Singing.
