= Borchi =

Borchi is a surname. Notable people with the surname include:

- Alessandra Borchi (born 1983), Italian track cyclist
- Stefano Borchi (born 1987), Italian racing cyclist

== See also ==
- Barchi, another surname
