= Earth (classical element) =

Classical element in ancient Greek philosophy and science

Earth is one of the classical elements, in some systems being one of the four along with air, fire, and water.

== European tradition ==
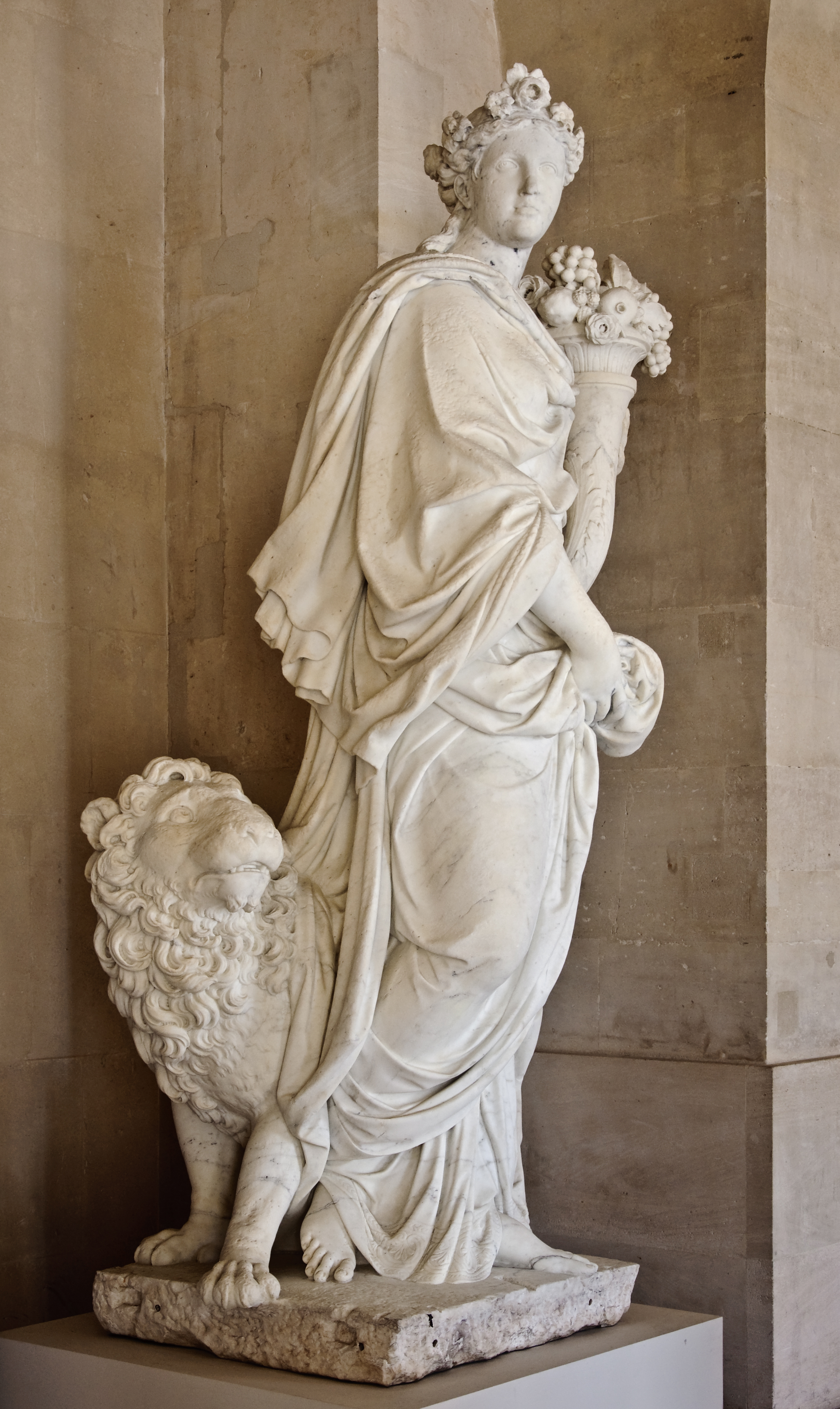
Earth (1681) by Benoît Massou, a statue of the Grande Commande, with allegorical attributes inspired by Cesare Ripa’s Iconologia.

Earth is one of the four classical elements in ancient Greek philosophy and science. It was commonly associated with qualities of heaviness, matter and the terrestrial world. Due to the hero cults, and chthonic underworld deities, the element of earth is also associated with the sensual aspects of both life and death in later occultism.

Empedocles of Acragas (c. 495 – c. 435 BCE) proposed four archai by which to understand the cosmos: fire, air, water, and earth. Plato (427–347 BCE) believed the elements were geometric forms (the platonic solids) and he assigned the cube to the element of earth in his dialogue Timaeus. Aristotle (384–322 BCE) believed earth was the heaviest element, and his theory of natural place suggested that any earth–laden substances, would fall quickly, straight down, towards the center of the cosmos.

In Classical Greek and Roman myth, various goddesses represented the Earth, seasons, crops and fertility, including Demeter and Persephone; Ceres; the Horae (goddesses of the seasons), and Proserpina; and Hades (Pluto) who ruled the souls of dead in the Underworld.

In ancient Greek medicine, each of the four humours became associated with an element. Black bile was the humor identified with earth, since both were cold and dry. Other things associated with earth and black bile in ancient and medieval medicine included the season of fall, since it increased the qualities of cold and aridity; the melancholic temperament (of a person dominated by the black bile humour); the feminine; and the southern point of the compass.

🜃, the alchemical symbol for earth

In alchemy, earth was believed to be primarily dry, and secondarily cold, (as per Aristotle). Beyond those classical attributes, the chemical substance salt, was associated with earth and its alchemical symbol was a downward-pointing triangle, bisected by a horizontal line.

== Hindu tradition ==
Prithvi (Sanskrit: pṛthvī, also pṛthivī) is the Hindu earth and mother goddess. According to one such tradition, she is the personification of the Earth itself; according to another, its actual mother, being Prithvi Tattwa, the essence of the element earth.

As Prithvi Mata, or "Mother Earth", she contrasts with Dyaus Pita, "father sky". In the Rigveda, earth and sky are frequently addressed as a duality, often indicated by the idea of two complementary "half-shells." In addition, the element Earth is associated with Budha or Mercury who represents communication, business, mathematics and other practical matters.

Jainism mentions one-sensed beings or spirits believed to inhabit the element earth sometimes classified as pṛthvīkāya ekendriya.

== Ceremonial magic ==
Earth and the other Greek classical elements were incorporated into the Golden Dawn system. Zelator is the elemental grade attributed to earth; this grade is also attributed to the Sephirot of Malkuth. The elemental weapon of earth is the Pentacle. Each of the elements has several associated spiritual beings. The archangel of earth is Uriel, the angel is Phorlakh, the ruler is Kerub, the king is Ghob, and the earth elementals (following Paracelsus) are called gnomes. Earth is considered to be passive; it is represented by the symbol for Taurus, and it is referred to the lower left point of the pentagram in the Supreme Invoking Ritual of the Pentagram. Many of these associations have since spread throughout the occult community.

It is sometimes represented by its Tattva or by a downward pointing triangle with a horizontal line through it.

== Modern witchcraft ==
Earth is one of the five elements that appear in most Wiccan and Pagan traditions. Wicca in particular was influenced by the Golden Dawn system of magic, and Aleister Crowley's mysticism which was in turn inspired by the Golden Dawn.

== Other traditions ==
Earth is represented in the Aztec religion by a house; to the Hindus, a lotus; to the Scythians, a plough; to the Greeks, a wheel; and in Christian iconography; bulls and birds.

== See also ==
- Earth
- Gaia (mythology)
- Mother goddess
- Mother nature
- Pherecydes of Syros
- Capricorn (astrology)
- Virgo (astrology)
- Taurus (astrology)
