= Barcha =

Type of pole weapon

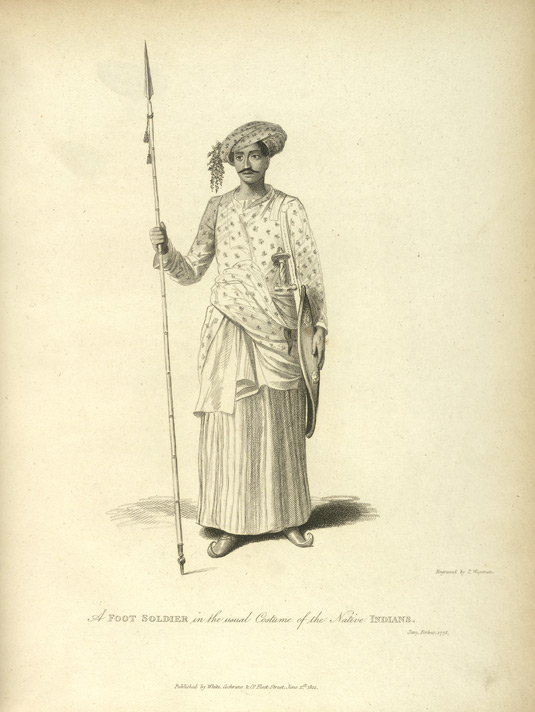
Soldier with a barsha

A barcha, barsha or brchha is a type of lance with a wooden handle, once common in South Asia (the word itself is Hindi). They were common in the 16th century.

== Use in combat ==
The weapon found itself very handy with the emerging Marathas in the early seventeenth century. It was lighter to carry in the mountainous terrain and easier to manufacture. A skilled spearman (bhalaeet) could keep a heavily armed foot soldier at bay. With his slashing and thrusting motions, he could inflict much damage while surrounded by a number of swordsmen. The illustrious use of this weapon is recorded in the last stages of Third Battle of Panipat by the Maratha general Sadashivrao Bhau. Another version of this weapon is the ballam, a javelin effectively used to bring down infantry and cavalrymen at a distance.

== Use in magic ==
The barcha is also considered a magical weapon used in a shaman's education. Along with purbe, a wooden ritual knife, and thudung, a drum, the lance was taught to the guru's student through participation in rituals. Variations of the barcha include the snake-like Nagini Barcha and the hand-shaped Karpa Barcha. Nagini Barcha was identified as the weapon used by the Sikh warrior Bachittar Singh during the siege of Lohgarh.

== See also ==
- Bagh nakh
- Chakram
- Katar
- Trishula

== Bibliography ==
- Balfour, Edward (1885). The Cyclopædia of India and of Eastern and Southern Asia. London: Bernard Quaritch.
- Mayaram, Shail (2003). Against History, Against State: Counterperspectives from the Margins. New York: Columbia University Press.
