= Water (classical element) =

One of four primary substances in antiquity

Water is one of the classical elements in ancient Greek philosophy along with air, earth and fire, in the Asian Indian system Panchamahabhuta, and in the Chinese cosmological and physiological system Wu Xing. In contemporary esoteric traditions, it is commonly associated with the qualities of emotion and intuition.

== Greek and Roman tradition ==
Water was one of many archai proposed by the Pre-socratics, most of whom tried to reduce all things to a single substance. However, Empedocles of Acragas (c. 495 – c. 435 BC) selected four archai for his four roots: air, fire, water and earth. Empedocles' roots became the four classical elements of Greek philosophy. Plato (427–347 BC) took over the four elements of Empedocles. In the Timaeus, his major cosmological dialogue, the Platonic solid associated with water is the icosahedron which is formed from twenty equilateral triangles. This makes water the element with the greatest number of sides, which Plato regarded as appropriate because water flows out of one's hand when picked up, as if it is made of tiny little balls.

Plato's student Aristotle (384–322 BC) developed a different explanation for the elements based on pairs of qualities. The four elements were arranged concentrically around the center of the Universe to form the sublunary sphere. According to Aristotle, water is both cold and wet and occupies a place between air and earth among the elemental spheres.

▽, the alchemical symbol for water

In ancient Greek medicine, each of the four humours became associated with an element. Phlegm was the humor identified with water, since both were cold and wet. Other things associated with water and phlegm in ancient and medieval medicine included the season of Winter, since it increased the qualities of cold and moisture, the phlegmatic temperament, the feminine and the western point of the compass.

In alchemy, the chemical element of mercury was often associated with water and its alchemical symbol was a downward-pointing triangle.

== Indian tradition ==
Ap (áp-) is the Vedic Sanskrit term for water, in Classical Sanskrit occurring only in the plural, āpas (sometimes re-analysed as a thematic singular, āpa-), whence Hindi āp. The term is from PIE h_{x}ap water.

In Hindu philosophy, the term refers to water as an element, one of the Panchamahabhuta, or "five great elements". In Hinduism, it is also the name of the deva, a personification of water, (one of the Vasus in most later Puranic lists). The element water is also associated with Chandra or the moon and Shukra, who represent feelings, intuition and imagination.

According to Jain tradition, water itself is inhabited by spiritual Jīvas called apakāya ekendriya.

== Ceremonial magic ==
Water and the other Greek classical elements were incorporated into the Golden Dawn system. The elemental weapon of water is the cup. Each of the elements has several associated spiritual beings. The archangel of water is Gabriel, the angel is Taliahad, the ruler is Tharsis, the king is Nichsa and the water elementals are called Ondines. It is referred to the upper right point of the pentagram in the Supreme Invoking Ritual of the Pentagram. Many of these associations have since spread throughout the occult community.

== Modern witchcraft ==
Water is one of the five elements that appear in most Wiccan traditions. Wicca in particular was influenced by the Golden Dawn system of magic and Aleister Crowley's mysticism, which was in turn inspired by the Golden Dawn.

== See also ==
- Water
- Sea and river deity
- Cancer (astrology)
- Scorpio (astrology)
- Pisces (astrology)
