= Barchas =

Barchas is a surname. Notable people with the surname include:

- Elizabeth Prelogar (born 1980; née Elizabeth Margaret Barchas), American lawyer
- Jack Barchas (born 1935), American psychiatrist
- Patricia Barchas (1934–1993), American behavioral neuroscientist
