= Murgleys =

Murglais, Murgleis or Murgleys, (possibly "Death brand") is the sword of Ganelon, a traitorous French (Frankish) count and nemesis to the titular hero of the epic La chanson de Roland (The Song of Roland).

According to the French version, its "golden pommel (l'orie punt)" (Note: While Brault renders Ganelon's L'orie punt as "golden hilt" at v. 466, the comparison has been made that Charlemagne's Joyeuse also has a "l'orie punt", construed as "pommel", and possibly both are gilded pieces, rather than only Ganelon's being solid gold.) held some kind of a holy "relic". (Note: Song of Roland, v. 607) (Note: Cf. Scholod: "every one of the major Christian heroes, including Ganelon, possesses his 'hallowed' blade".)

In the Middle High German adaptation (Konrad der Pfaffe's Rolandslied) the sword is called Mulagir, touted to be the "best short sword in all of France", (Note: The original text, v. 1584, gives "Mulagir daz beste sachs (A text), or "Mulagir daz mere sahs (S text), and while " seax" would be cognate to MHG sachs/sahs, the term sahs is glossed in Lexer simply as "long knife or short sword", and Thomas's English rendering here gives "excellent short sword".) described as having a carbuncle on its pommel that shone bright by night, forged by a smith named Madelger in Regensburg. It had belonged to Naimes who brought it out of his fiefdom of Bavaria and presented it to Karl(Charlemagne), but unfortunately Ganelon took possession of it and carried it to the Saracen side. (Note: Rolandslied vv. 1568–1609. Wesle, Carl, ed. (1986), Das Rolandslied des Pfaffen Konrad, 3tte Auflage besorgt von Peter Wapnewski (3 ed.), Tübingen: Max Niemeyer Verlag, pp. 80–83.)

== Nomenclature ==
=== Forms ===
Anglo-Norman: Murglies, Murgleis (vv. 346, 607 Oxford ms.), Franco-Italian: uncoded: Mordea Old Norse: Muraglais (Note: The form Mordée is given by Langlois.) Middle High German: Mulagir

In editions: Murgie, Morgie Morglès (Moncrieff tr.).

=== Etymology ===
Dorothy L. Sayers, a translator of The Song of Roland suggests the sword means "Death brand" (cf. § Similarly named swords below). Belgian scholar Rita Lejeune gave the meaning "Moorish sword", (Note: mor (French: maure+glais (Provençal, meaning "glaive, gladius"), Lejeune (1950), p. 163, quoted by Scholod.) but Arabist James A. Bellamy proposed the Arabic etymology māriq ʾalyas meaning "valiant piercer".

== Similarly named swords ==
At least three swords bearing the similar name Murglaie occur in other chansons de geste.

- Murglaie - sword of Elias, the Swan Knight of the Crusades cycle,
- Murglaie - sword of Cornumarant, the Saracen king of Jerusalem, taken by Baudouin de Syrie (the historical Baldwin I of Jerusalem). It subsequently belonged to the title character of Le bastard de Bouillon
- Murglaie - sword of Boeve de Haumtone; better known as Morglay of Bevis of Hampton.

Note that "Morglay" has been given the etymology morte "death" + "glaive" coinciding with the conjectural meaning of "Death brand" for Ganelon's sword, proposed by Sayers.
