= List of magical weapons =

This is a list of magical weapons from fiction and folklore. A magical weapon is one that is directly described as such in the work, or one that has obvious fantastic or supernatural qualities.

== In folklore ==
- Trident – Weapon usually attributed to water deities in Western Culture, such as Poseidon. In Hinduism, it is the weapon of Shiva, known as trishula (Sanskrit for "triple-spear").
- Sword Kladenets – a fabulous magic sword in some Old Russian fairy tales.
- Dyrnwyn – Sword of Rhydderch Hael in Welsh legend; When drawn, it blazed with fire; if drawn by a worthy man, the fire would help him in his cause, but its fire would burn the man who drew it for an unworthy purpose.
- Hrunting and Nægling – Beowulf's magical swords.
- Shamshir-e Zomorrodnegar – Legendary Persian sword.
- Skofnung – sword of legendary Danish king Hrólf Kraki.
- Thunderbolt – as wielded by various mythological deities such as Zeus.
- Vajra – A composite weapon made from the bones of a willing sage used by Indra.
- Sharur – the enchanted talking mace of Ninurta, Sumerian god

=== Arthurian legend ===
- Excalibur – The sword King Arthur got from the Lady of the Lake.
- Caliburn – Another name for Excalibur, but in some versions of the legends is the sword King Arthur pulled from the stone.
- Marmiadoise, it is also known as Mamyadoise. Marmiadoise is a sword said to originally belong to the greek deity Hercules and was later given to his descendants, this sword would eventually be used by King Rions until he was killed by King Arthur during a battle. This sword would later be adopted by Arthur himself as he considered it to be superior when compared to the Excalibur.
- Clarent – King Arthur's sword of peace. Also known as the Coward's Blade as it is the sword Mordred, his son, stole and later used to kill King Arthur.
- Carnwennan – King Arthur's dagger.
- Galatine – Gawain's sword granted by the Lady of the Lake said to make the wielder invincible under the sunlight.
- Pridwen (also Wynebgwrthucher) – The shield of King Arthur. Shares its name with the boat he sailed on to reach Avalon.
- Rhongomiant – King Arthur's Spear.
- The Sword with the Red Hilt - used by Sir Balin, Sir Galahad, and Sir Lancelot. Any unworthy knight who wields it extensively is cursed to kill the man he loves most. Balin unknowingly kills his brother with it.
- The continuously bleeding lance which maimed the Fisher King is said to have dark powers.
- The Sword with the Strange Hangings - It once belonged to David and may only be drawn from its scabbard by Galahad, the worthiest of knights.

=== Chinese folklore ===
- Ru Yi Jing Gu Bang – Magical staff wielded by the Monkey King Sun Wukong in the Chinese classic novel, Journey to the West.

Some weapons in Chinese folklore do not, strictly speaking, have magical properties, but are forged with materials or methods that are unique in the context of the story.

- Green Dragon Crescent Blade – Exceptionally heavy guandao wielded by Guan Yu in the Romance of the Three Kingdoms; forged with the blood of a green dragon.
- Gan Jiang and Mo Ye – Legendary Chinese twin swords named after their creators.

=== Indian mythology ===
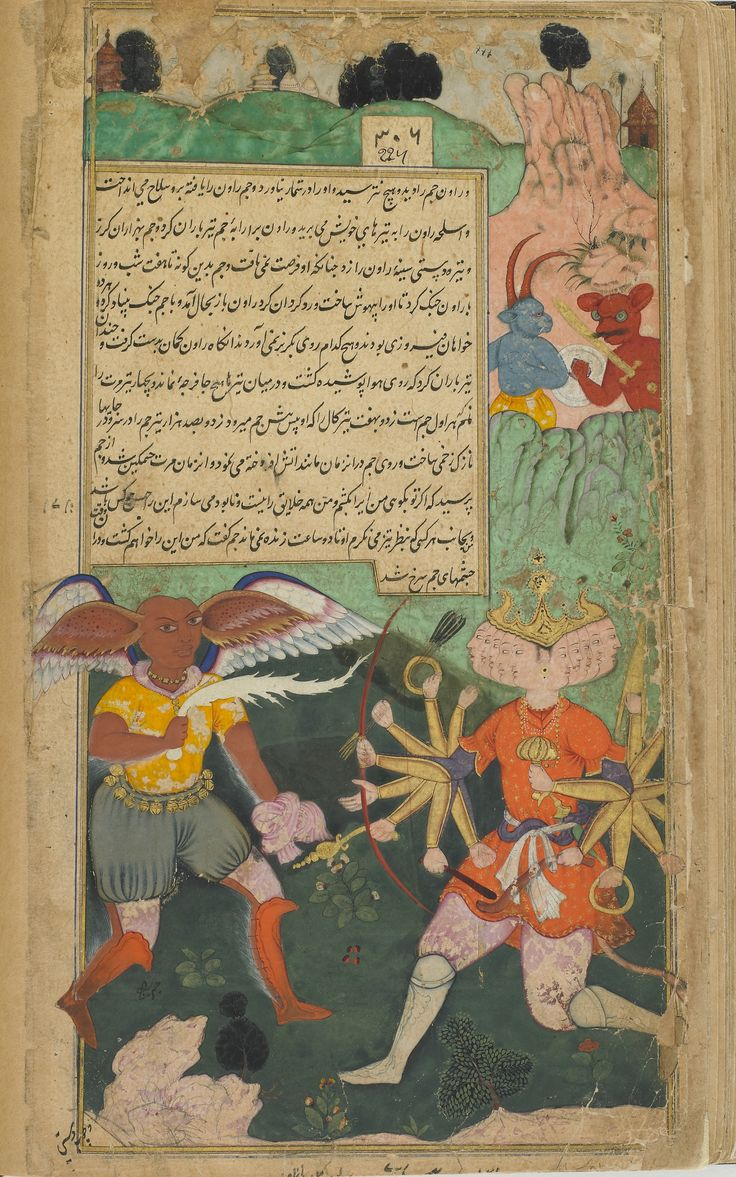
Yama advances to smite Ravana with the weapon of death.

- Arrow of Brahma – The arrow given by the sage Agastya to Rama (seventh avatar of Vishnu) and was used to kill Ravana.
- Asi – A legendary divine lotus sword created in ancient times as the first weapon to destroy the enemies of the gods and restore dharma.
- Astra – Divine celestial weapons with devastating impacts which could be invoked by reciting mantras and forming hand signs.
- Chandrahansa – In the Hindu epic Ramayana, the Chandrahansa sword is an indestructible sword that Lord Shiva gifts Ravana.
- Chentu - A horse whip which looks like a crooked stick, and is a typical attribute of Aiyanar, Krishna in his aspect as Rajagopala, and Shiva with Nandi.
- Gada – A mace used by the Ape God Hanuman.
- Gandiva – An indestructible bow with 100 strings created by Brahma and later used by Arjuna.
- Halayudha – A plough used as a weapon by Balarama.
- Kaladanda – the staff of Death is a special and lethal club used by the God Yama or God of Naraka or Hell in Hindu mythology. It was the ultimate weapon; once fired it would kill anybody before it no matter what boons he had to protect himself.
- Kaumodaki – The Gada (mace) of the Hindu god Vishnu.
- Kaundinya's bow – A magic bow wielded by the merchant Brahmin Kaundinya I, who used it to make the Nāga princess Queen Soma fall in love with him.
- Khaṭvāṅga – In Hinduism, the god Shiva-Rudra carried the khatvāṅga as a staff weapon and are thus referred to as khatvāṅgīs.
- Kodandam – Rama's bow.
- Mace of Bhima – A club that was presented by Mayasura. It was a weapon of Danava King Vrishaparva.
- Nandaka – Nandaka or Nandaki is the sword of the Hindu god Vishnu.
- Parashu – The parashu is the weapon of the god Shiva who gave it to Parashurama, sixth avatar of Vishnu, whose name means "Rama with the axe".
- Pasha – A supernatural weapon depicted in Hindu iconography. Hindu deities such as Ganesha, Yama and Varuna are depicted with the pasha in their hands. The pasha is used to bind a foe's arms and legs or for hunting animals.
- Pattayudha – The divine sword of Lord Virabhadra, commander of Lord Shiva's armies.
- Pinaka – The great bow of Shiva, arrows fired from the bow could not be intercepted.
- Sharanga – The bow of the Hindu God Vishnu.
- Sharkha – The bow of Krishna, eight avatar of Vishnu.
- Pinākapani (Shiva's bow) – A bow given by Shiva to Janaka and broken by Rama during Sita's swayamvara.
- Sudarshana Chakra – The legendary discus of Vishnu, which cannot be stopped by anyone, except by Lord Vishnu and Lord Shiva. It has tremendous occult and spiritual powers, by which it is able to destroy anything.
- Teen Baan – Shiva gave Barbarika three infallible arrows (Teen Baan). A single arrow was enough to destroy all opponents in any war, and it would then return to Barbarika's quiver.
- Trident of Madhu – It was given as a boon by Shiva to Madhu, a Rakshasa. Then he gave it to his son Lavanasura. It was a very powerful weapon. It destroys anyone who directly fights with its master.
- Trishula – The trident of Shiva, stylized by some as used as a missile weapon and often included a crossed stabilizer to facilitate flight when thrown. Considered to be the most powerful weapon.
- Vajra – A lightning thunderbolt wielded by Indra, the god of rain and thunderstorms.
- Vasavi Shakti – The magical dart of Indra. Used by Karna against Ghatotkacha in the Mahabharata War.
- Vel – Vel is a divine javelin (spear) associated with the Hindu war god Karthikeya.
- Vijaya – The bow of Karna, one of the greatest hero of the Hindu epic Mahabharata. The bow of Indra is also called Vijaya.

=== Islamic mythology ===
- Zulfiqar – A sword belonging to Ali ibn Abi Talib.

=== Irish mythology ===
- Fragarach – Sword of the god of the seas Manannan mac Lir and later Lugh in Irish legend; it was said to be a weapon that no armour could stop.
- Caladbolg – Two-handed sword of Fergus mac Róich in Irish legend; said to make a circle like an arc of rainbow when swung, and to have the power to cleave the tops from the hills.
- Moralltach (Great Fury) – a highly lethal sword belonging to Aengus, which left no stroke or blow unfinished at the first trial. Aoegus eventually gave to his foster-son Diarmuid Ua Duibhne along with a second sword of less power, the Beagalltach (Little Fury).
- Gáe Buide and Gáe Dearg – Spears of Diarmuid Ua Duibhne, given to him by Aengus. They were said to inflict wounds from which none could recover.
- Claíomh Solais – Sword of Nuada, the king of the gods in Irish mythology; in legend, the sword glowed with the light of the sun and was irresistible in battle, having the power to cut his enemies in half.
- Gáe Bulg – Spear of Cúchulainn; made from the bones of a sea monster.
- Spear of Lugh – Spear of Lugh, the champion of the gods in Irish mythology.

=== Japanese folklore ===
- Ame-no-nuhoko – Japanese halberd which formed the first island.
- Kusanagi – Legendary Japanese sword. Can also be considered as Kusanagi-No-Tsurugi.
- Muramasa – The katana forged by famous swordsmith Muramasa, it was rumored that it was a demonic sword that can curse the wielder to murder people. It also said that the demonic sword rumor was made by Ieyasu Tokugawa, the 1st Shogun of the Tokugawa Shogunate because he hated those swords made by Muramasa.
- Tonbogiri – One of three legendary spears created by the famed swordsmith Muramasa. It is said to be so sharp that a dragonfly landing on the edge would be instantly cut in half. This is the origin of the name, which means "Dragonfly Cutter".
- Honjo Masamune – A legendary and real Japanese sword (with alleged mythical abilities), created by Japan's greatest swordsmith, Goro Nyudo Masamune. The Masamune sword is by far the most referenced Japanese sword in popular fiction, ranging through books, movies and computer games.
- Murasame – A magical katana that mentioned in fiction Nansō Satomi Hakkenden, it said the blade can moist itself to wash off the blood stain for keeping it sharp.

=== French mythology ===
- Almace – The sword of Archbishop Turpin.
- Durendal – Indestructible sword of Roland.
- Hauteclere – The sword of Oliver.
- Joyeuse – Charlemagne's personal sword.
- Cortain or Cortana – The sword of Ogier the Dane.
- Murgleys - The sword of Ganelon.
- Flamberge, or Froberge - The sword of Renaud de Montauban.

=== Norse mythology ===
- Angurvadal (Stream of Anguish) – A magical sword of Viking, and later Frithiof. The sword was inscribed with Runic letters, which blazed in time of war, but gleamed with a dim light in time of peace.
- Dáinsleif – King Högni's sword that gave wounds that never healed and could not be unsheathed without killing a man.
- Dragvandil – The sword of Egill Skallagrímsson.
- Forseti's axe (also Fosite's axe) – A golden battle axe that Forseti (or Fosite in the Frisian mythology) used to save the old sages of the wreck and then threw the axe to an island to bring forth a source of water.
- Freyr's sword – A magic sword which fought on its own. It might be Lævateinn.
- Gambanteinn – A sword which appears in two poems in the Poetic Edda
- Gram – Sword of the hero Sigurd from Norse mythology, also known as Nothung in the Ring cycle
- Gríðarvölr – A magical staff given to Thor by Gríðr so he could kill the giant Geirröd.
- Gungnir – Odin's spear created by the dwarf Dvalinn. The spear is described as being so well balanced that it could strike any target, no matter the skill or strength of the wielder.
- Hǫfuð – The sword of Heimdallr, the guardian of Bifröst.
- Hrotti – Hrotti is a sword in the Völsung cycle (Fáfnismál, Völsunga saga, 20). It was a part of Fáfnir's treasure, which Sigurðr took after he slew the dragon.
- Lævateinn – A weapon mentioned in Fjölsvinnsmál by Sophus Bugge. Ostensibly forged by Loki.
- Legbiter – The sword of Magnus III of Norway.
- Mistilteinn – The magical sword of Þráinn, the draugr, later owned by Hromundr Gripsson. It could never go blunt.
- Mjölnir – The hammer of Thor. It was invulnerable and when thrown it would return to the user's hand.
- Quern-biter – Sword of Haakon I of Norway and his follower, Thoralf Skolinson the Strong, said to be sharp enough to cut through quernstones.
- Ridill (also Refil) – Sword of the dwarf Regin.
- Skofnung – The legendary sword of Danish king Hrólf Kraki. It was renowned for supernatural sharpness and hardness, as well as for being imbued with the spirits of the king's twelve faithful berserker bodyguards.
- The Sword of Surtr – The weapon the fire giant Surtr wields in the battle of Ragnarok. The Prose Edda calls it a flaming sword, although in the Poetic Edda merely it is described only as a "bright blade."
- Tyrfing – A sword made by dwarves in the Elder Edda. It would kill a man when drawn and would eventually kill its wielder.

=== Spanish folklore ===
- Tizona – the sword of El Cid, it frightens unworthy opponents, as shown in the heroic poem Cantar de Mio Cid.
- Colada – the other sword of El Cid, as Tizona its power depends on the warrior that wields it.
- The lance of Olyndicus – wielded by the Celtiberians' war chief Olyndicus, who fought against Rome. According to Florus, he wielded a silver lance that was sent to him by the gods from the sky.

=== Vietnamese folklore ===
- Thuận Thiên Kiếm (Sword of Heaven's Will), the mythical sword of the Vietnamese Emperor Lê Lợi, given to him by the Dragon King (Long Vương), who used it to liberate Vietnam from Ming occupation after ten years of fighting from 1418 until 1428. According to the legend, after defeating Ming China, Emperor Lê Lợi was boating on the Hoàn Kiếm Lake (in Hanoi) when a Golden Turtle God (Kim Qui) surfaced and asked for his magic sword.

== In novels ==
- Ice - A Valyrian steel greatsword owned by house Stark in A Song of Ice and Fire a Book series by George R.R. Martin. A sword notable for its large size and large history.
- Grayswandir – The magic sword wielded by Corwin in The Chronicles of Amber by Roger Zelazny. Sister blade of Werewindle.
- Ruyi Jingu Bang – A magical staff wielded by Sun Wukong in Journey to the West.
- Sword of Gryffindor – In the Harry Potter series, a sword that was previously owned by Godric Gryffindor. It has the power to reveal itself to any worthy Gryffindor student in a time of need. In the novels, it reveals itself to Harry and Neville Longbottom during dire situations.
- The Sword of Shannara – The sword enchanted by the druids to reveal truth in Terry Brooks novels.
- The Sword of Truth – The sword wielded by the Seeker of Truth in the Terry Goodkind novels.
- Callandor - an unbreakable sword made of crystal, "The Sword That is Not a Sword" is also a powerful aid to channeling (magic) in the Wheel of Time series.

=== The works of J. R. R. Tolkien ===
- Anglachel – One of the two swords forged by Eöl the Dark Elf out of a black iron meteorite. It is said to be able to cleave any iron from within the earth. Anglachel appears to be a sentient sword that speaks on occasion and has some will of its own.
- Glamdring, Orcrist and Sting – High-Elven swords; glow with a blue or white flame when Orcs are near. These are obtained during the events of The Hobbit and are carried respectively by Gandalf, Thorin Oakenshield and Bilbo Baggins. Sting is later passed onto the latter's nephew Frodo Baggins.
- Morgul-blade – Magical poisoned dagger wielded by Nazgûl.
- Caudimordax – This sword cannot be sheathed when a dragon comes within five miles of its bearer's presence.
- Andúril/Narsil – The sword of Elendil that was used by Isildur to cut the One Ring from Sauron (Narsil) reforged several ages later by Elrond (Andúril); the reforging of the shards was foretold as a sign of the coming of the true King of Gondor.
- Aiglos – The spear with which the Elven king Gil-galad went to war.

=== The works of Michael Moorcock ===
- Mournblade – An enchanted blade from Michael Moorcock's Elric stories, twin to Stormbringer.
- Kanajana – The sword of Erekose.
- The Runestaff – A magical staff in Moorcock's Dorian Hawkmoon novels which preserves the Cosmic Balance.
- Stormbringer – One of the two vampiric black runeswords inherited by the Melnibonean kings. Wielded by Elric of Melnibone.
- The Sword of the Dawn – A magical blade in Moorcock's Dorian Hawkmoon novels.

=== In Dungeons & Dragons ===
- Dragonlances – In the Dragonlance novels and roleplaying supplements, a dragonlance is a weapon created for defeating evil dragons.
- Whelm – A hammer introduced in White Plume Mountain. Whelm can only be wielded by a dwarf. It can create shockwaves, and returns to the wielder's hand once thrown.
- Axe of the Dwarvish Lords - Powerful weapon first introduced to the game in 1976. A dwarf who possesses the axe increases their innate abilities.

== In popular culture ==
- The Lasso of Truth – a weapon wielded by DC Comics superhero Wonder Woman that forces anyone it captures into submission; compelling its captives to obey the wielder and tell the truth.
- The Power Rings – used by members of the DC Comics superheroes, the Green Lantern Corps, and others
- The Power Sword and the Sword of Protection – He-Man. Twin swords wielded by Prince Adam and his sister Adora in the Masters of the Universe cartoons and toy line.
- The Sword of Triton - Blackbeard's sword, later wielded by Hector Barbossa with magical properties that first appears in the 2011 film Pirates of the Caribbean: On Stranger Tides. According to the film's visual guide, the Sword of Triton was forged in the lost city of Atlantis as well as commands and channels unearthly and mystical power that brings dead matter to life. The Pirates of the Caribbean Online website states that the sword was forged by the sea deity Triton himself and that it has passed from one ancient mariner to another until falling into Blackbeard's possession. In On Stranger Tides, Blackbeard uses the sword to ensnare the mutinous crew of the Queen Anne's Revenge by the ship's ropes and unleash Greek fire upon mermaids at Whitecap Bay. It is revealed that Blackbeard attacked the Black Pearl, which led Barbossa to claim Blackbeard's ship and sword. Barbossa used the sword's magical properties to control the wind, as well as the ship's rigging, and sailed the Revenge to Tortuga. In the 2017 sequel Dead Men Tell No Tales, it is revealed that the Black Pearl was trapped in the bottle "five winters" earlier before Barbossa stabs the bottle with the sword, restoring the miniaturized Pearl to its original size. Although it was not clarified onscreen, Terry Rossio's unproduced screenplay for Dead Men Tell No Tales reveals the sword's powers comes from Rhysis, one of the three Pearls of Neptune, which commanded the winds of the sea and was hidden inside the sapphire that was embedded into the hilt of the Sword. The Pearl rules the winds of the ocean, and everything associated with the wind, including the ships at sea, their rigging and sails.
- The Lightsaber (Star Wars) - an energy sword powered by a rare Force-attuned crystal (also known as Kyber Crystal), which can only be used to its full potential by those skilled enough in the Force to wield it. Each lightsaber is constructed by its wielder as a rite of passage, making each one of them unique. Lightsabers are used by the Jedi, an order of Force-using peacekeepers, and their evil counterpart, the Sith.
- The Darksaber (Star Wars) - a variant on the Lightsaber which symbolically turns its wielder into "Mandalore", the rightful ruler of the Mandalorians. It can only be claimed by challenging its wielder in single combat, and using it takes its toll on an inexperienced or reluctant wielder.

== See also ==
- Magic ring
- Magic sword
  - Flaming sword
- Wand
