= Fabrizio Barchi =

Italian choir conductor

Fabrizio Barchi

Fabrizio Barchi (born 1957 in Ostia, Rome) is an Italian choir conductor.

== Profile ==
Barchi’s career as a choir conductor began in 1979 while still completing his studies at the Pontifical Institute of Sacred Music of Rome. Since then he has been conducting several choirs both in musical associations and schools. Besides the Coro Musicanova, his choirs include the Primavera treble choir (Coro di voci bianche Primavera), the Eos female choir (Coro Femminile Eos), the Iride choir (Coro Iride) and the high school choirs Primo Levi and Enriques, with whom he has been awarded many prizes during the years. His work at the local and national level includes collaborations with important composers such as Ennio Morricone, artistic direction of festivals and regional choral associations, an intense involvement as vice-conductor of the musical chapel of St. John Lateran and holder of the chair of Choral Conductorship at the Conservatory Lorenzo Perosi of Campobasso.

== See also ==
- Coro Musicanova
