= Skofnung =

Sword of legendary Danish king Hrólf Kraki

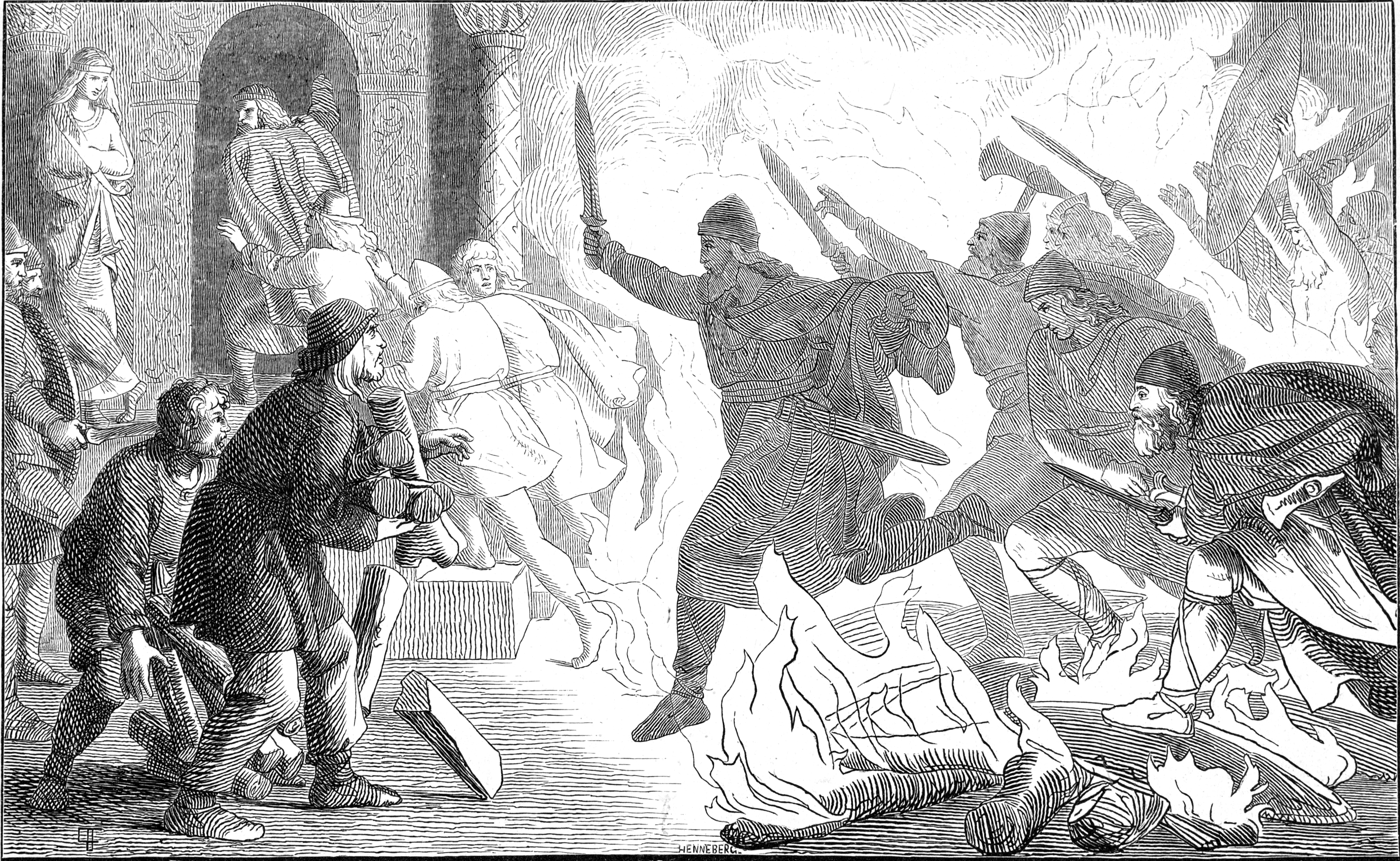

Skofnung (Old Norse: Skǫfnungr) is in medieval Icelandic literature the sword of legendary Danish king Hrólf Kraki. According to Hrólfs saga kraka, it was "the best of all swords that have been carried in northern lands."

== Portrayal ==
Skofnungr appears in a saga unrelated to Hrólfr: it is said that an Icelander, Skeggi of Midfirth (or Miðfjarðar-Skeggi), who was chosen by lot to break into a gravemound and plunder it, recovered the sword while doing so. Other similar incidents are found in Norse literature, such as Grettir the Strong's recovery of a sword from a burial mound. Events concerning the recovery of Skofnung are related in chapters 9 and 10 of Kormáks saga. Kormak borrows Skofnung from Skeggi for his duel with Bersi, who carries another magical sword, Hviting. Skeggi gives Kormak meticulous instructions for handling the sword, such as keeping the pommel away from the sun. Kormak disregards Skeggi's instructions and ultimately loses the duel to Bersi.

Skofnungr also appears in Laxdœla saga, where it has come into the possession of Eiðr of Áss. Eiðr is the son of Skeggi, who had originally taken Skofnungr from Hrólf Kraki's grave. The sword is handed down from Eiðr to his kinsman Þorkell Eyjólfsson. Eiðr lends the sword to Þorkell to kill the outlaw Grímr, who has killed Eiðr's son. Þorkell fights Grímr, but the two became friends, and Þorkell never returns the sword to Eiðr.

Skofnungr is briefly lost when Þorkell's ship capsizes while sailing around Iceland and all of those on it drown. The sword sticks fast in some of the ship's timbers and washes ashore. It is thus recovered at some point by Þorkell's son Gellir, as he is mentioned carrying it with him later in the saga. Gellir dies in Denmark returning from a pilgrimage to Rome and is buried at Roskilde, and it seems Skofnungr is buried with him (near where the sword was recovered from the burial mound in the first place), as the saga says that Gellir had the sword with him "and it was not recovered afterward".

According to Eiðr of Áss in chapter 57 of Laxdœla saga, the sword is not to be drawn unless a battle is imminent, and the sun must never shine on the sword's hilt. This is in accordance with many other ancient superstitions, such as the Eggjum stone in Norway. Eiðr also says that any wound made by Skofnungr will not heal unless rubbed with the Skofnungr Stone, which Eiðr gives to Þorkell Eyjólfsson along with the sword. The sword was not to be drawn if a woman was nearby.

While Tyrfing, a Norse sword with magical properties, "could never be held unsheathed without being the death of a man, and it had always to be sheathed with blood still warm upon it," no such characteristic is attributed to Skofnung in literature.
