= Arrow of Brahma =

Weapon in Hindu mythology, a symbol of which is used in rituals

The Arrow of Brahma is from Hindu writings. It is also an implement in a ritual of the Theravada Buddhists.

== Hindu mythology ==
In Hindu mythology, the god Rama (Ramachandra) faced the demon king of Sri-Lanka, Ravana. Rama shot arrows and knocked off each of Ravana's ten heads, but new ones grew immediately. The new heads doubled Ravana's strength. Finally, Rama fired the arrow of Brahma that had been imparted to him by Agastya, a sage and heavenly historian, while Rama, Sita, and Lakshmana were exiled in Dandaka Forest. The arrow of Brahma burst Ravana's navel which contained the elixer, and returned to Rama's quiver. Ravana was destroyed and Rama was able to return home in victory.

=== Appearance ===
The arrow of Brahma that Rama shot had feathers of winds. The points were sun and flames. The shaft was Mount Meru, the hub of the universe and where Brahma lived.

=== Role in the Yaktovil Ritual ===
The yaktovil is a lengthy, complex ritual that prevents malevolent, supernatural beings from overpowering patients. The ritual is performed by Theravada Buddhists in Sinhala communities in Sri Lanka. During the ritual, a straight branch with one end in the shape of an arrowhead referred to as the 'arrow of Brahma' is used as a ritual implement.

== See also ==
- Brahmastra

== Sources ==
- Reynolds, Frank; Carbine, Jason A. The Life of Buddhism, Life of Religion- Volume 1. Berkeley University of California Press.
