= Chentu =

- Type: Whip
- Place of origin: India

A chentu (Tamil: செண்டு) is a horse whip which looks like a crooked stick, and is a typical attribute of Aiyanar, Krishna in his aspect as Rajagopala, and Shiva with Nandi. The attribute of chentu, which is etymologically derived from a Tamil word, generally appears in Southern India, especially in Hindu images of Tamil Nadu state, India.

According to mythology, as mentioned in the "Sendal-Bandal" of the Thiruvilayadal Purana that Shiva gave Ugrapandiyan the weapon of Chendu, and that Pandiyan struck the eroded Mount Meru with that weapon, removing its eroded surface. Silappadhikaram mentiions that Karikala Chola invaded the north and conquered it, and that the Himalayas were carved by a tiger.
