= Holger Danske (disambiguation) =

Holger Danske, or Ogier the Dane, is a legendary character appearing in medieval chansons de geste.

Holger Danske may also refer to:

- Holger Danske (resistance group) a Danish resistance group of World War II
- Holger Danske (opera), a 1789 Danish opera with music by F.L.Æ. Kunzen and Jens Baggesen
- MS Holger Danske, a car- and passenger ferry between Oslo, Norway and Denmark 1961-1989.
