= Otgar =

Otgar, Otger or Odgar is a Germanic masculine given name (from Proto-Germanic *Audawakraz). It may refer to:

- Saint Otger (fl. 8th century), missionary
- Autchar (fl. 8th century), Frankish nobleman
- Otgar of Mainz, archbishop (826–847)
- Otgar, bishop of Eichstätt (847–880)
- Hoger (died 906), abbot and music theorist
- Otgar, founding abbot of Saint-Pons-de-Thomières (937–940)
- Otgar, bishop of Speyer (962–970)
- Otger of Girona, Catalan count (c. 862 – c .872)
- Otger Cataló, figure of Catalan legend

== See also ==
- Hoger
- Ogier (disambiguation)
