= Ogier the Dane =

Legendary Knight of Charlemagne

- Matter of France character
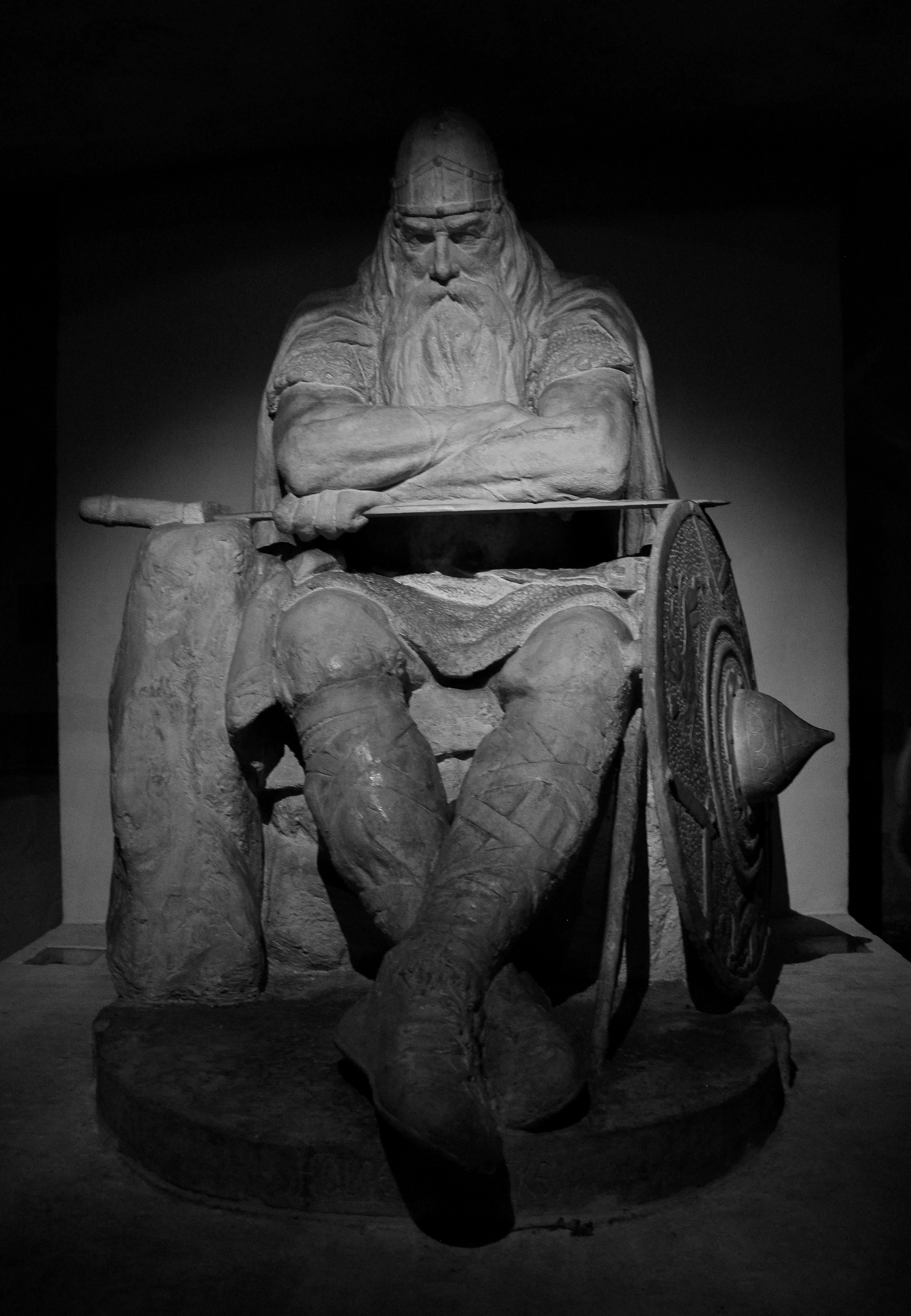
- Hans Peder Pedersen-Dan's statue of Holger Danske in the casemates at castle Kronborg
- First appearance: The Song of Roland
- Based on: Autchar (Otker), Adalgis, Othgerius Francus

In-universe information
- Occupation: Knight (paladin)
- Weapon: Cortain
- Family: Father: Gaufroi (var. Gaudefroy, Geoffroy, Geoffroi); Mother: Passerose; Danemonde; Gloriande; Step-mother: Belissent
- Significant others: Daughter of castellan of Saint-Omer (Mahaut, Guymer, Belicène); daughter of king of England (Clarice); Morgan le Fay
- Children: Baudouin; Meurvin
- Nationality: Danish

Ogier the Dane (French: Ogier le Danois, Ogier de Danemarche; Danish: Holger Danske) is a legendary paladin of Charlemagne who appears in many Old French chansons de geste. In particular, he features as the protagonist in La Chevalerie Ogier (c. 1220), which belongs to the Geste de Doon de Mayence ("cycle of the rebellious vassals"; Doon is Ogier's grandfather).

The first part of this epic, the enfance[s] (childhood exploits) of Ogier, is marked by his interrupted duel against the courteous Saracen king Caraheu, from whom he obtains the sword Cortain, to fight a fresh Saracen opponent Brunamont, whom he beats to win the horse Broiefort. In the second part occurs the momentous scene of Prince Charlot murdering his son Baudouin over a chess match, turning Ogier into a rebel with cause, seeking refuge with the King of Lombardy and warring with Charlemagne for many years, until he is eventually reconciled when a dire need for him emerges after another Saracen incursion. Ogier loses his beloved old horse in battle, but conquers Bauçant from his opponent (cf. § Horses and equipment).

In the 14th century, the decasyllabic epic was expanded into a romance, now describing Ogier's further adventures in the Orient and his visit to Avalon as lover of the fay Morgan, his return to France after centuries, and the instantaneous loss of youth when the magic of the fay's ring wears off. The introduction of the Ogier character into the Arthurian world, including his dealings with Arthur himself and the Cath Palug of Welsh lore (Capalus in French writings), was also related in Jean d'Outremeuse's Mirrors of History. Later in the 14th century an Alexandrines version of the romance appeared, as well as a prose adaption printed from a few years before 1500.

In Scandinavia, he was first known as Oddgeir danski in the Old Norse prose translation of the first part of Chevalerie Karlamagnús saga III. Later he became more widely known as Olger or Holger Danske, and was given the pedigree of being Olaf son of King Gøtrik in a 16th-century Danish translation of the French romance in print. Holger Danske's fight with the savage "Burman" was sung in Danish and Swedish balladry. Holger Danske has also become a Danish folklore hero of the "Barbarossa" or sleeping hero type, and eventually a symbol of Danish identity and patriotism as well as anti-German nationalism.

His character is a composite based on an historical Autchar, who was aligned with king Desiderius of Lombardy against Charlemagne, and a Lombardian king Adalgis. The legend of a certain Othgerius buried in Meaux is also incorporated into the Chevalerie.

== Name ==
Ogier the Dane's first appearance (spelled Oger) in any work is in Chanson de Roland (c. 1060), where he is not named as one of the douzepers (twelve peers or paladins) of Charlemagne, although he is usually one of the twelve peers in other works. In the poeticized Battle of Roncevaux Pass, Ogier is assigned to be the vanguard and commands the Bavarian Army in the battle against Baligant in the later half. He plays only a minor part in this poem, and it is unclear what becomes of him, but the Pseudo-Turpin knows of a tradition that Ogier was killed at Roncevaux.

There is a mention of almost comparable antiquity in the Nota Emilianense written in Medieval Spanish (Old Castilian) (now dated to c. 1065–1075) where the warrior bears the nickname "Ogier of the short sword" (Oggero spata curta).

== Historical references ==
The Ogier character is generally believed to be based on Autcharius/Otker, (Note: "Autcharius" is the spelling as occurs in the Vita Hadriani (biography of Pope Adrian I in the Liber Pontificalis, "Otkerus" in a work by Notker Balbulus, a monk of St. Gall (fl. 885).) a Frankish knight who had served Carloman and escorted his widow and young children to Desiderius, King of Lombardy, but eventually surrendered to Charlemagne. (Note: Knud Togeby objected to identifying with Autcharius, and proposed Audacar who led Charlemagne's troops in Bavaria.) The Ogier character could also have been partly constructed from the historical Adalgis (or Adelgis, Algisus), son of Desiderius, who played a similar role. (Note: The exploits of "Algisus" is given full account in the Chronicon novaliciense.) The chanson de geste does parallel this, and Ogier does seek refuge with the Lombardian king Didier or Désier (as Desiderius is styled in French).

An unrelated Othgerius (Otgerius), a benefactor buried at the Abbey of Saint Faro in Meaux in France, (Note: Bédier's characterization was that this Othgerius had no distinction besides having donated some parcels of land to the abbey and being buried there (Voretzsch (1931), p. 209).) became connected with Ogier by a work called Conversio Othgeri militis (ca. 1070–1080) written by the monks there. This tradition is reflected in the chanson of Ogier, which states that the hero was buried at Meaux (cf. § Legend at Meaux).

There is no Ogier of consequence in Danish history; at least, no Ogier as such appears in Saxo Grammaticus's Gesta Danorum. However, the Danish work Holger Danskes Krønike (1534) by Christiern Pedersen transformed Ogier into the son of King Gøtrek of Denmark, namely Oluf son of Gøtrek. (Note: There are various spellings: "Godfred", etc.) (Note: The "Fortale" of the original begins "Gøttrick Kong Olger danskis fader]" and later states "Der effter lod kong Gøttrick forsamble de ypperste herrer oc frwer i riget/ ath de skulde vere hanss faddere/ Saa lod han cristne Olger och kallede hannem Oluff/ Men ieg vil kalle hannem Olger (Then he was baptized and christened Oluf, but I shall call him Ogier)"; also in Hanssen's edition.)

According to the Chronicon Sancti Martini Coloniensis (c. 1050) which purports to tell the early history of the Great St. Martin Church, Cologne, "Olgerus, dux Daniæ" ("Olger, War-Leader of the Danes"), one assisting Emperor Charlemagne, was a great benefactor to the St. Martin monastery pillaged by the Saxons in 778, serving to rebuild. However, this is not a contemporary record and may just be poetic fiction.

== Legend in France ==
Besides the earliest sporadic mention in Chanson de Roland, a full career of Ogier from youth to death is treated in La Chevalerie Ogier de Danemarche, a 13th-century assonanced poem of approximately 13,000 lines, (Note: 13,058 in the Barrois edition, less in Eusebi's edition.) attributed to Raimbert de Paris, preserved in six manuscripts. (Note: The five manuscripts BADMP, known to Cerf, plus 1 more (ms. S).) (Note: Manuscript A, the BnF ms. fr. 24403 contains Ogier on f. 174r-277v according to the catalogues, but the digital view of f.174 is followed by a hand-copy in cursive hand on paper to replace the lost original. The famed chess scene painting occurs at 199v.) It relates Ogier's early years, his rebellion against Charlemagne and eventual reconciliation. This is now considered a retelling. (Note: Bédier called it a "remaniement (reworking)", but this term is also used by Keller to refer to the Alexandrine version.) Ogier in a lost original "Chevalerie Ogier primitive" (Note: Bédier's term.) is thought to have fought alongside the Lombards because Charlemagne attacked at the Pope's bidding, as historically happened in the Siege of Pavia (773–74), that is, there was no fighting with the Saracens (i.e. Muslims) as a prelude to this.

The legend that Ogier fought valiantly with some Saracens in his youth is the chief material of the first branch (about 3,000 lines (Note: 3102 lines in Barrois's edition.)) of Raimbert's Chevalerie Ogier. This is also recounted in Enfances Ogier (c. 1270), a rhymed poem of 9,229 lines by Adenet le Roi. The story of Ogier's youth develops with close similarity in these two works starting at the beginning, but they diverge at a certain point when Raimbert's version begins to be more economical with the details.

In the 14th-century and subsequent versions of the romance, Ogier travels to the Avalon ruled by King Arthur and eventually becomes paramour of the fairy Morgan (the earliest known mention of her as his lover is in Brun de la Montaigne). This is how the story culminates in Roman d'Ogier, a reworking in Alexandrins written in the 14th century, as well as its prose redaction retitled Ogier le Danois (Ogyer le Danois) printed in a number of editions from the late 15th century onwards. The Alexandrines version may contain some vestiges of the lost 12th-century Chevalerie Ogier. It is also possible that Ogier the Dane has first appeared in the Arthurian context as the Saxon prince Oriolz (Note: Different variants of his name include Orels, Oriels, Oriens, Orient, Orients, Orienx, Oriles, Oriol, Oriols, and Oriolts.) the Dane (de Danemarche), sometimes known as the Red Knight, in the 13th-century Vulgate Merlin and its English adaptation Arthour and Merlin.

There are also several texts that might be classed as "histories" which refer to Ogier. Girart d'Amiens' Charlemagne contains a variant of Ogier's enfances. Philippe Mouskes's Chronique rimée (c. 1243) writes on Ogier's death. Jean d'Outremeuse's Ly Myreur des Histors writes of Ogier's combat with the capalus (chapalu), which is a giant cat monster known from the Arthurian cycle.

=== Horses and equipment ===
==== Broiefort ====
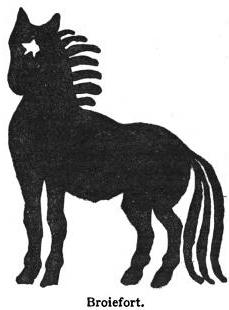
Broiefort, horse won by Ogier form his Saracen opponent Brunamont —Lucien Laforge, in Butts, Mary (1913) Les infortunes d'Ogier le Danois

In Chevalerie Ogier, Ogier wins the horse Broiefort (Note: Prose romance spells as Broifort, or Broiffort.) (Note: Bulfinch spells as Beiffror, matching Count Tressan's spelling Beiffror, (other horse names match as well).) from his Saracen opponent Brunamont (cf. § Chevalerie Ogier). (Note: Befoli (var. bifolen, Befolen) is the name of Burnament's horse in the saga, and it was a horse "which had shed its teeth four times") The horse is described as "all black, with a starred forehead" (cf. fig. right), and a young foal with its teeth shed (and regrown) four times over. (Note: On the interpretation that it is not four teeth, cf. Grimm and the saga version.)

In the combat, he is provided with the sword Corte/Cortain (Note: Corte (vv. 1663, 2965, 8596, etc.) in ChO, but later more usually Cortain (vv. 1860, 1883, 2701, 2828, etc.). Cf. Langlois.) by Caraheu. Brunamont also owned Nebuchadnezzar's helmet or sword (sword owned by Nabugodonosor) according to variant mss. of Chevalerie Ogier. (Note: Mss. ADM, v. 2730).) (Note: Likewise, in Karlamagnús saga III, Ch. 37 the heathen Burnament owned a "sword which had belonged to King Nebuchadnessar" (Old Norse: Nabogodonosor). Brunamont is seen armed with this sword and riding Befoli into duel against Oddgeir;)

Years later, Ogier is brought out of confinement, when a fresh Saracen wave of attack requires his help. Turpin had secreted away his weapons and equipment, but did not grasp the whereabouts of Broiefort, and subsequently, Charlemagne's horse (one given him by Balant, (Note: Barrois ed. (1842), vv. 10425–7, where base text gives "conquered from" ("le bon ceval corant que je conqis à l'amiraus Balant") but the footnoted ms. A reading of "ke me dona li messagiers [Balant]" is preferred in order to match L'Aspremont where Balan gives Charles a white horse.)≈Blanchart[?] (Note: Charlemagne's Blanchard is spared from the test according to Bulfinch, but, Count Tressan's retelling gives "Charles lui fit amener les plus vigoureux chevaux de son écurie, & jusqu'à Blanchard son cheval de bataille", which could be construed as "up to and including Blanchard among the most vigorous horses of his stable". Charlemagne does in fact ride on Blanchart in Chevalerie Ogier Branch II and Branch IV I)) and also Didier's Pennevaire were tested, but none could withstand the weight of Ogier. (Note: Barrois ed. (1842), Penevaire, v. 10455. Cf. also digital copy of ms. A.) But Broiefort had been kept at the monastery of St. Faro (Abbaye Saint-Faron de Meaux), and horse and master are reunited.

==== Baucent ====
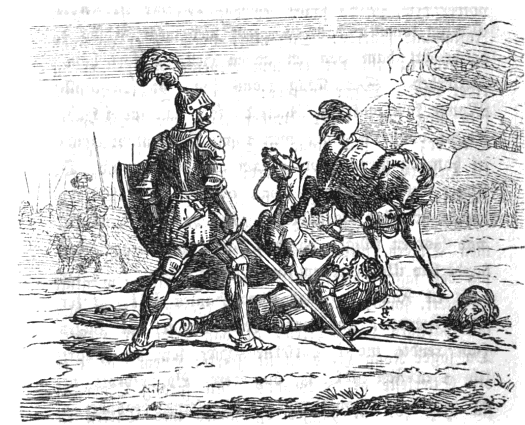
Olger Danske beheads Justamund as Bussant has killed opponent's horse. —By W. Marstrand, in Hanssen ed. (1842) Olger Danskes Krønike

Baucent or Bauçant (Note: Bauçant is mentioned first at v. 7321.) is the horse which Ogier conquers from Brehier/Braiher/Bréhus of Africa (Note: Barrois ed. (1842) Analyse, p. xcii: L'Africain Bréhus 9796; the text tells his territory stretches from Africa, including Babylone (Cairo), to Damascus, and even includes Saxony. Barrois employs other spellings in analyse: his cabin: "Cabane de Braiher 11148"; his injury and hurtling: "Braiher blessé, 11389; hurlement 11396"; sliced (with Corte): "Pourfend Brahier [sic]" 11487; mortal wound: "Braiher blessé à mort 11776". Ludlow initially notes the spelling variations as: "Brehus (or Brehier)", p. 292. Langlois's entry is under "Brehier des Tour de Mont Argüe".) after defeating him in a decisive duel. Ogier loses his old horse Broiefort in the process, but now gains a new warhorse (cf. § Chevalerie Ogier). The name means "black and white" or "piebald". (Note: Gaudefroy (1880) 1: 602, s.v. "baucent" apud Heebøll-Holm (2013)) (Note: The term bauçant signifies a pied or piebald coat, which appears to be the usage in this work, but some hold the term to mean balzan (splashed white).)

Bulfinch's retelling mistakenly transposes the name Marchevallee here, which is in concert with Tressan who replaces the horse's name with Marchevallée but this is a mistake. As discussed below, Marchevalée is a horse won from a different character called Nordin, sultan of Babylone (Cairo), as recounted in what used to be called the chanson de geste fragment La Délivrance d'Ogier le Danois.

In the romance, when Ogier combats Bréhus/Bruhier's brother Justamon[t], the battle begins with the recognition that Ogier is mounting the very horse taken from the opponent's brother. There ensues a pitched battle by sword off-horse, Ogier bats down the enemy's sword, but Justamont reciprocates by knocking down Courtain, and they are interlocked, until they each draw their swords, and Ogier strikes off Justamont's arm. In the meanwhile their horses fought, and Bouchant gave such a kick with the hind legs that it perforated straight through the heart of Brun de Surie ("Brown of Syria"). Ogier chided that the other shall never ride Brun again, Justamont has time to repartee he needs not ride it since he intends to inherit (Bouchant) from his brother, but at that point his head is struck off (cf. fig. right).

==== Marchevalée ====
Marchevalée (modernized: Marchevallée), marceualee was formerly the prized horse of Noradin, (Note: Noradin is the typical westernized spelling of Nur al-Din.) the soudan of Babylone (Cairo), but was captured by Ogier's nephew Gautier and made a gift of the horse to Ogier (cf. § Contents of the romance).

==== Papillon ====
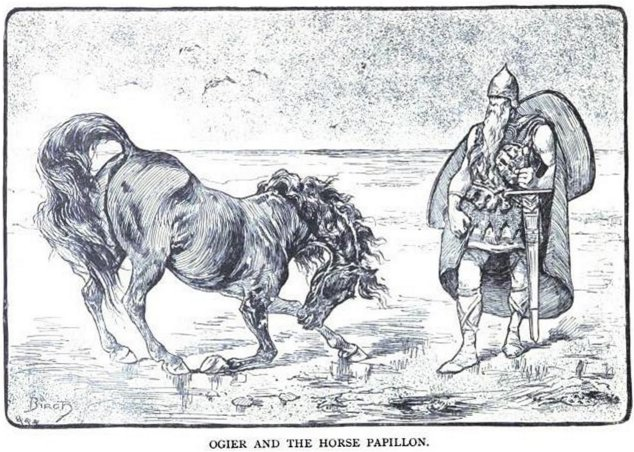
Ogier and the fairy horse Papillon. —Illustration by R. B. Birch in Baldwin (1899) Story of Roland

Papillon, in the romance version of the tale, is the horse which Ogier obtains in the fairyland of Avalon. Papillon had been a prince of the luitons (lutins), but conquered by King Arthur, he was condemned to remain speechless in the form of horse for 300 years, after which he is promised to be able to wear his fairy crown once again.

When the fay Morgue (Morgan) consents to letting Ogier return to France after 200 years to aid them against Saracens, Papillon is provided to accompany the knight. Papillon startles everyone with its prowess, "opening his mouth so wide it was like a furnace, spewing two dragons, causing everyone to flee". (Note: Rigaud (1579), p. 450, Chapter [54] "Comment Ogier partit de Faerye..": "Adonc papillon.. ouvrit la gueulle si grande qu'il sembloit que de sa gorge fust une fournaise, & tantost jetta deux dragons de sa gorge tant que toul le monde s'ensuyoit".) When Ogier negotiates to engage in a close fight with the enemy Saracen leader Florion (and the amiral of Nubia), they stipulate that Ogier cannot ride the wicked horse Papillon for the contest. Ogier attempts to comply by riding Blanchard, but Papillon will not have it, and strangles the royal white horse to take its place, having changed color from black to white to deceive everyone about the switch. (Note: Rigaud (1579), pp. 473–474, Chapter [56] " Comment le Roy de France saillist.. ..": "Papillon... le mua de noir en blanc..; il estrãgla blãchart..; avoit tué blanchart le bon cheval du Roy...".)

=== Legend at Meaux ===
Mausoleum of the Abbey of St. Faro, Meaux
View entire right half / view entire illustration (from 1735 edition).

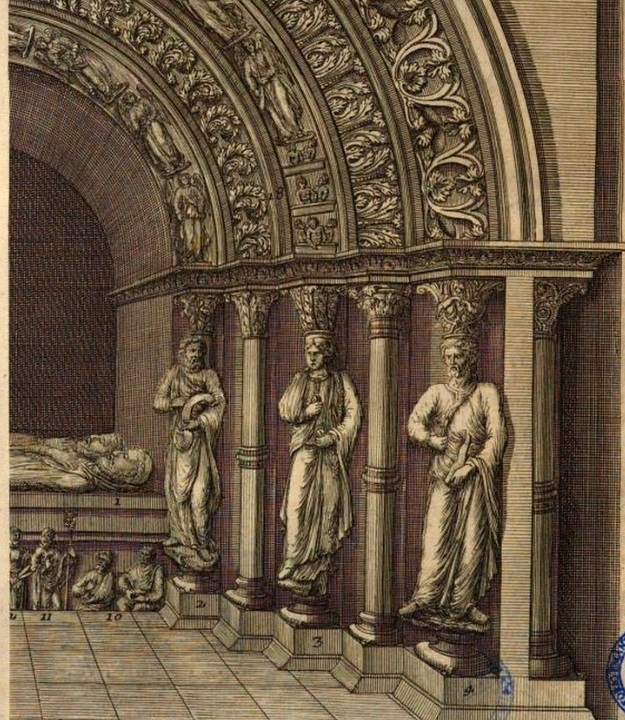
Othgerius/Ogier is one of two reclining tomb effigies on the sarcophagus at center.

―Acta Sanctorum Ordinis S. Benedicti (1677 edition)

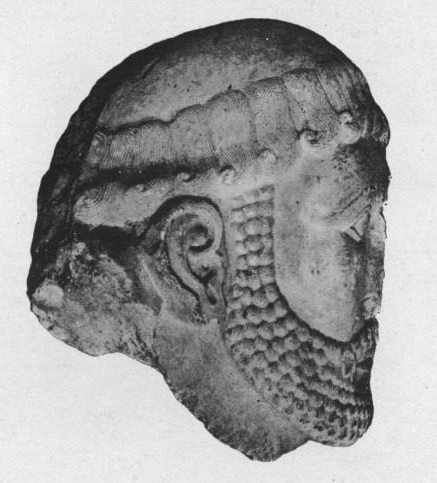
Ogier head

A legend of Conversio Othgeri militis was invented by the monks at the Abbey of Saint Faro at Meaux around 1070–1080. It claimed Othgerius Francus ("Frankish") to be the most illustrious member of Charlemagne's court after the king himself, thus making him identifiable with Ogier the Dane. (Note: Various references cite this document ("Conversion of Othger") as being one (purportedly) about Ogier. Cerf even refers to the document as Conversio Ogeri militis ("Conversion of Ogier").) He was buried in the abbey in a mausoleum built for him. His remains were placed in a sarcophagus lidded with his recumbent tomb effigy lying next to that of Saint Benedictus, and the chamber was enshrined with erect statues of various figures from the Charlemagne Cycle. A stone head later found in Meaux was determined to be Ogier's head from comparisons with these incunabula etchings. This stone head can still be viewed today.

This document was first commented on by Jean Mabillon in his Acta Sanctorum Ordinis S. Benedicti, printed editions of which include a detailed illustration of the mausoleum at St. Faro. The statues at the mausoleum even included la belle Aude, affianced to Roland, with one of the inscriptions there (according to Mabillon) claiming that Aude was Ogier's sister. (Note: Togeby (1966), p. 113 states it differently, that the inscriptions agree with the chanson Girart de Vienne where Aude is Oliver's sister. But Mabillon can be quoted thus: "...forsan ab Auda matre, Otgerii nostri sorore, Rotlando nupta".) It underwent restoration in 1535 by the Italian Gabriele Simeoni. (Note: Pointed out by Philipp August Becker, citing Alexis Mallon.) That mausoleum is no longer preserved, but an illustration of the interior was printed in editions of Mabillon's Acta Sanctorum Ordinis S. Benedicti.

=== Chevalerie Ogier ===
Ogier is the main character in the poem La Chevalerie Ogier de Danemarche (written c. 1200–1215). The work consists of twelve parts (or "branches") (Note: Analyse, pp. xcix–c has only the XI. heading, but in the text proper XII begins v. 12495. Togeby (1969), p. 46 and Renier (1891), p. 396 states Barrois edited into "douze branches".) of varying lengths. (Note: Barrois ed. (1842) Analyse, pp. lxxi-c; Summaries by Renier (1891), pp. 397–404; Hist. Litt. France (1895), pp. 643–659; Ludlow (1865), pp. 247ff and 299–300) (Note: Barrois edited the text divided into theses branches, and made the determinations on where the divisions by the dropped capital letters in one of the manuscripts (ms. B).) Attributed to Raimbert de Paris, in assonant decasyllabic, edited by Barrois (1842) in 13,058 verses, (Note: Togeby counts the lines in the original Chevalerie as 13,856 verses, which the longer decasyllabic romance expands by c. 17,000 verses. Poulain-Gautret counts around 13,650 lines (from the Arsenal ms. in Alexandrines).) based on ms. B. with occasional readings from ms. A. (Note: Cf. Arlima re manuscripts.)

In the first branch of the poem (sometimes referred to as the Les enfances Ogier portion (Note: Voretzsch divided the work into five chapters, and his first chapter, Les enfances Ogier was the same as Branch I, vv. 1–3100 (of the Barrois edition).)), (the motherless (Note: In Gaufrey (the chanson de geste about Ogier's father), Ogier's mother Passerose died after giving birth. In the Alexandrine verse version, Geoffroy's wife is called Danemonde who dies after bearing Ogier.)) Ogier is introduced as the "forhostaged" son of Godefroy of Denmark/Godfrey/Gaufroi (Note: But the father's name Godefroy is styled Geoffroy in the mise en prose Ogier (1498) and hence "Geoffroy" by Thomas Bulfinch in his retelling, as well as by later commentators ("Geoffroi de Danemark", son of Don de Mayence or Geoffrey, eldest son of "Doolin of Mayence". The latter spellings are confusingly the same as that of "Geoffroi d'Anjou" (Joffori d'Angiers v. 335).)) in the land of Charlemagne (v. 5), but as the king holds court at Saint-Omer at Easter, his envoys return from Godefroy with shaven moustaches and beards. Charles vows revenge (vv. 7–25) and confines Ogier to a castle-fort, but there he becomes intimate with the castellan's daughter, who bears him a son, named Baldwinet (Old French: Bauduinet, dim. of Baudouin). The poem predicts this child is destined to be killed using by Prince Charlot, alluding to the cause of later rift between Charlemagne and the grieving Ogier (vv. 26–90).

Back in the palace, Charlemagne summons the castellan to bring Ogier, and vows to have Ogier dismembered in revenge of the ambassadors, (Note: In this chanson de geste version it hardly seems killing a hostage is commensurate to shaving the facial hairs of messengers. But the prose version exacerbates the "disfigurement" into the slicing off of their lower lips and turning their noses upside-down. In Count Tressan's retelling Geoffroy of Denmark mistreats the messengers with the barbarity of the scion of Odin inflicted on them, leaving them maimed (défigurés. Bulfinch dispenses with the gore saying Geoffroy merely gave a defiant answer, while E. M. Wilmot-Buxton's 1910 anthology tells that Godefroy "slit their ears and noses,..") and Ogier blames his father Godefroy and stepmother Belissent for his woes (vv. 100–117). (Note: After years have passed, the father Geoffroy of Denmark becomes derelict in paying fresh homage to Charlemagne, because he has developed new love interest and the hostaged Ogier and his dead mother Gloriande has become a fuzzy memory according to Tressan. Bulfinch however describes the deliberate failure of homage on the machinations of Ogier's step-mother acting in interest for her son Guyon. Note that in the interim, Ogier is having dalliances with the castellan's daughter whom Tressan calls Belicène (!).) Ogier pleads innocence (vv. 118–122), but the vassals' support (vv. 124–155) and the queen's (v. 156) are to no avail.

When Charles (Charlemagne), at the Pope's request, launches a war campaign against Saracens invading Rome, Ogier is there initially as an unarmed bystander. But when the French suffer a setback, Ogier joins the fray, seizing the flag (oriflamme (Note: p. lxxi "Alori porte l'Oriflamme 438"; The king asks who will take it, and Alori volunteers: Qui donrai-jo m'oriflambe a porter?»/Dist Aloris «Sire, moi la donés, vv. 437–438.)) and arms from a fleeing standard-bearer, Alory. (Note: According to the closing chapter of the saga adaptation, "Oddgeir was his standard-bearer as long as they both lived".) Ogier comes waving the oriflamme to succor King Charles, and for his deeds, "Ogier is knighted by the king, who girds him with his own sword". Next, Ogier accepts the challenge of single combat from the Saracen warrior Karaheut of India, (Note: "Karaheut" in Ludlow (1865) and Voretzsch (1931), p. 209; The courtois "Karaheu" in Togeby (1969), p. 51. Langlois, Table des noms, p. 132, lists "Caraheu, Craheut, Karaheu, Karaheut, Karaheult, Kareeu". "Karahues" and "Karahuel" are also used.) but enemies interrupt and abduct Ogier. Karaheut protests for Ogier's release, to no avail, and loses his engagement to the amiral's daughter Gloriande (Glorianda). The amiral then decides his daughter should marry the brutish warrior Brunamont of Maiolgre, (Note: Mallorca according to Ludlow, but there may not be consensus on this.) but she is unwilling, and appoints the captured Ogier as her champion to fight on her behalf. Ogier, armed with Karaheut's sword Cortain (or Corte, Cortana, etc.), (Note: In the saga version, Karvel supplies Oddgeir with the sword Kurtein.) clips off the ear, then arm, and finally cuts down Brunamont and confiscates the horse Broiefort. Brunamont is struck dead by Ogier, who ties his head to the cruppers, and takes his horse, (Note: "La conquist-il Broiefort l'aduré" (v. 3089). The saga version also states the horse (Befoli) was taken by Oddgeir. In the Chevalerie Ogier, the capture.) Brunamont's defeat proved decisive, the Saracens were routed, with the fleeing amiral (Corsuble) cut down dead by Naimes, and Danemon killed by Ogier. (Note: Barrois ed. (1842), p. lxxij: "L'Emir en suite, 3023; mort 3035. Ogier tue Danemon 3041. texte: "Namles va férir l'amirant (3031).. Grant cop (3033).. mort sanglant (3035)") Charles provides 60 ships, 30 barge-boats, 20 dromons loaded with goods and provision for Caraheu, Gloriande, and Sadoine to go home.

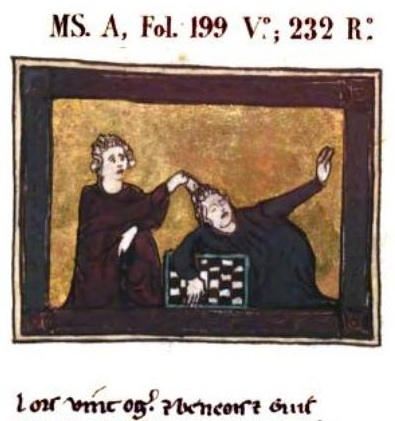
Prince Charlot kills Ogier's son over chess. —Barrois ed. (1842). Based on the painting in MS. A, BnF fr. 24403

In the second branch, (Note: Voretzsch's Chapter 2 "La partie d'éschecs" or "the chess portion" corresponded to Branch II, vv. 3101–3472.) Ogier's son Bauduinet (Baldwinet) is slain by Charlot over a game of chess. (Note: The miniature of the scene occurs in the Paris manuscript, and also a replica was printed in the Barrois edition, as shown →fig. below.) (Note: The Talbot Shrewsbury Book copy of Ogier le Danois fol. 86r-154v has a miniature features the same scene (combines "Charlemagne receiving homage" with "Baudoin is killed with a chess board") at the beginning fol. 86r, this is the only painting for this work in this manuscript.) (Note: Cf. miniature of the murder of Baudouinet in the Paris copy of Vérard's prose editions, BNF, Vélins 1125, f. e 1v.) (Note: In the Petit Laurens edition, c. 1495, a woodcut of the chess scene. An identical woodcut appears in Vérard's Merlin, having appropriated it from Jean de Vingle's edition of Ogier dated 1498, as Fabry-Tehranchi explains.) Ogier attacks Charlot and demands his life in revenge, resulting in his banishment. Ogier is given safe haven by King Didier of Pavia (Note: Based on the historical Desiderius, as aforemetioned.) in Lombardy.

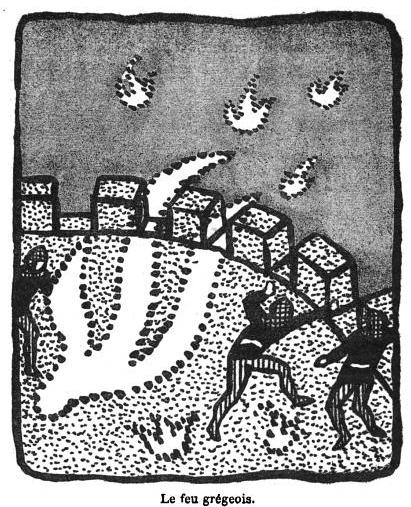
Greek fire —Lucien Laforge, in Butts, Mary (1913) Les infortunes d'Ogier le Danois

Ogier strengthens the fortifications at Castelfort (Chastel Fort) and Mont Quevrel in Lombardy. In the subsequent branches, (Note: Branch III, vv. 3472–5864, was Voretzsch's Chapter 3. "La guerre de Lombardie", or "The War in Lombardy"; Voretzsh combined Branches IV–VIII as Chapter 4. "Castelfort" (vv. 5865–9551).) Ogier holes up at the Chastelfort (Château-fort) on the Rhône, and sustains attacks by siege engines like the mangonel, but Ogier's squire Benoit fights back using Greek fire (see fig. right). Ogier continues his wars with Charlemagne (alone, after losing his squire Benoit/Bennet), enduring for seven years, then is taken prisoner for another seven years.

After the notice that Ogier entered his 7th year of imprisonment, (vv. 9761–5) the ninth branch begins, (Note: Branch IX, vv. 9794–11040. Voretszh combines Branches IX–XII into Chapter 5, La guerre des Saxons(vv.9552–12346).) and renewed attack by the Saracens, led by Brehus (or Brehier) forces Charlemagne to seek Ogier's help. Ogier is released, a series of tests conducted to find a horse that can bear his weight under saddle, but he crushes all of the best horses from Charlemagne's stable (including a gift horse from Balant; cf. Blanchard) and named horses (cf. § Broiefort). After all the commotion, Ogier is reunited with his old war horse Broiefort, which had been under the care of monks at St. Faro (cf. § Legend at Meaux above) (vv.9796–10380, 10381–10450).

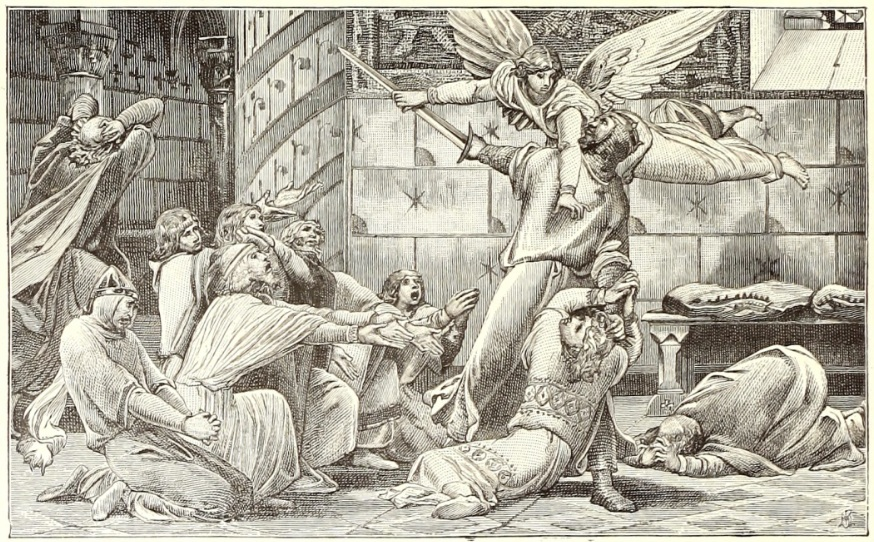
Ogier's execution of Charlot stopped by angel. —From Léon Gautier ed. Chevalerie (1884), design by Luc-Olivier Merson

The warhorse is ready, but Ogier refuses to fight unless Prince Charlot's life is forfeit for murdering his son. Charlemagne is flummoxed, but receives stern advice from Duke Naimes that the fate of Christendom rests on it, and he himself had pardoned Ogier for killing his son Bertram (Bertran v. 10842). But just when Ogier was about to strike Charlot down with Cortain Archangel Michael appears and stops the sword, giving Charlot only a buffet instead (vv. 10451–11038) (Note: Incunabula printed book editions of prose also preserves the angel scene: Rigaud (1579), p. 233: "Comment.. Charlemaigne fut contrainct de liurer son filz Charlot à Ogier... & comment l'Ange ainsi qu'il vouloit coupper la teste de Charlot luy retint le bras".) (cf. image left (Note: Illustrations of the angel staying Ogier's sword hand can be found in Gautier (1884), p. 608, Pedersen & Hanssen ed. (1842), p. 139, etc.)). Here ends the ninth branch, which the editor Barrois says is the end of the poem as originally written by Raimbert, the rest of the portion being later expansions.

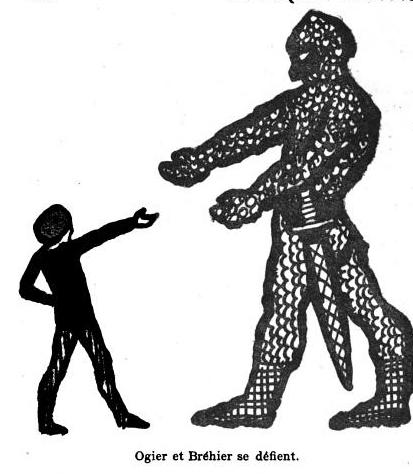
Ogier faces Bréhier —Lucien Laforge, in Butts, Mary (1913) Les infortunes d'Ogier le Danois

In the tenth branch, Ogier actually fights the giant, King Brehier/Braiher/Bréhus of Africa, who measures an unreal 17 feet (5.2 m) in height, bears a sword of Galant's make worth three times as much as Ogier's sword Corte. and mounted on Bauçant ("black and white"). Ogier's horse Broiefort is sadly killed, but Ogier strikes off his foe's head (vv. 11039–11856). When the eleventh branch commences, Ogier makes trophy of the horse Bauçant (vv. 11857–11947).

Branch XI (vv. 11882–12494) mainly concerns the Saracens vengefully attacking, embroiling an English princess whom Ogier saves, followed by Ogier sustaining the fight alone against thousands of enemies (cf. below). Then in Branch XII, Charlemagne presents Ogier with the English princess's hand in marriage, also granting him County of Hainaut and Duchy of Brabant as fiefdoms (vv. 13007–13031; 13040–1). The Saracens had made an incursion into Hainaut Province (now in Belgium. v. 11880), and the daughter of Angart (Edgar), king of England lusted after by twenty Saracens, Ogier comes to her rescue.

The particulars of the post-Brehier warring is skipped over by the aforementioned above-cited summaries, (Note: And the abridged translation by Butts reduces it to "les Sarrasins.. attquent l'armée de Charles: grande est la mêlée et le combat terrible..." (ellipsis hers) omitting also the mention of the English princess.) but the chanson names a series of Saracen enemies who show up and Ogier exchanges blows with his Corte and new horse Bauçant. (Note: An excerpt of the enemies are: "Sarrasin né de Perse" 11907, "Turc.. Helpin .. fix..roi d'Aumarie/ & cinq Turc " 11954–5, 11958; "Belias l'Esclavon 12132 ="Bélians [roi de Cordres et Aquiton] li fix Méliaton 12152–3; "Floirens li niés Méliaton" 12132; Belias/Beliant rides: "sus Pennevaire 12157, Penevaire 12186 1220"; Insoré[s] (son of Brehier, cf. note below) 12615, 12917 Hertu rois des Saisnes (Saxony) 12268 (cf. note below) who rides Saut-Perdu 12274; Sorbarés, Malcus, Méliatons, l'amiraus Raburs, 12303–4, etc.) Ogier fends well against paynims by the hundreds and even thousands (vv. 12438–9). It appears that rest of the French were oblivious, as Charlemagne was asleep when he dreams of his greyhound being attacked by leopards (vv. 12446–52). the English maiden describes Ogier's situation as "Païen l'encauchent, plus sont de dex millier (being hotly pursuit by paynims by the tens of thousands)" (v. 12468), and presses Charlemagne on what to do about it.

Branch XII (vv. 12494–13058) opens with idyllic verses on the month of May, (Note: Cf. Butts's abridged translation.) but there follows a long flashback by Ogier and others on the warring that occurred. Branch XII closes with the note Ogier that and his squire Benoit/Bennet are interred at Meaux (vv. 13054–5).

The above summary of the branch also overlooks the significance of the fact this attack was rallied, among others, by Insoré (Ysoré, Isoré) the son of Brehier. (Note: Insoré[s] is the reading in Barrois 12615, 12917, etc. In the text, Brahier d'Aufique has passed on the crown to him (vv. 12615-7). But Cloetta (1907), pp. 542–543, having privately consulted Voretzsch, was informed that Insoré was a rogue reading in ms. B (Tours manuscript) which Barrois employed, and "Ysoré/Isoré" was the probably normal reading.) In another work, Moniage Guillaume, recension I, there is an Ysoré the prince of Saxony who engages in the siege of Paris in revenge for his father Bruhier being killed by Ogier, and the argument is made that this is the same personage. (Note: Wilhelm Cloetta who edited the recensions of the Moniage Guillaume emphasizes that in Chevalier Ogier, Bruhier was not only lord of Africa and Damascus, but Saxony as well. However, note that the Saracen army also includes a "king of Saxony" (also "Rois fu des Saisnes") called Hertu 12268, Hertéus 12294.) Either way Ysoré becomes a key figure in the continuations.

=== Enfances Ogier ===
Adenet le Roi (d. c. 1300) composed Enfances Ogier by reworking only the first branch of the Chevalerie Ogier (upto the duel with Brunamont (Note: Chevalerie v. 3007, Karlamagnús saga ch. 45, Adenet v. 4097, according to Togeby.)) for the first half of his work, then crafted a second half (c. 4000 lines) not in, or rather different from Chevalerie. (Note: Bovy (1898) for instance argued a second possibility that both Raimbert and Adenet worked off a common earlier version, so that the old manuscript that Adenet pretends to have found at St. Denis, at the beginning of the poem, must have been a "primitive" version different from Raimbert.)

Thus in Adenet, is only after the duel with Brunamont that Carahuel gives the sword Cortain to Oggier. (Note: Although note in Barrois's analyse of Chevalerie says it twice: the gift of the sword is made before the duel ("Caraheu donme sp épée a Ogier, 2700") then Ogier is said to have won the horse and sword afterwards ("Ogier gagne Broiefort et Courtain 3089").) The subsequent kills of Corsuble by Naimes and then of Danemon by Ogier in Raimbert (cf. above) is changed to Ogier killing Danemon followed by Charlemagne lodging Joyeuse in Corsuble's head Adenet. This change of sequence allows Adenet to interpose a scene of Corsuble lamenting the death of his son.

Adenet also elucidates a clear reason for the grievance with the Danes, namely Gaufroi of Danemarche had warred against Constance of Hungary, Charlemagne's aunt causing damages, which led to the imposition of tribute and taking of hostage. Later, when the dust settles, the ill will between the houses is mended by the double marriage of Gaufroi with Constance, and his daughter with her son. Ogier's love interest, the castellan of Saint-Omer's daughter is here named Mahaut (var. Mahaus), who bears him Badouin. (Note: Adenet le Roi, Enfances Ogier. Mahaut 7853, 7866, 7954; Mahaus 7857, 7868, et analyse.)

=== Decasyllabic Roman d'Ogier ===
Modified verse versions were produced in the 14th century. The decasyllabic remaniement Roman d'Ogier appeared (31000vv., early 14th cent. or c. 1310 or c. 1350) which survived in only one unique copy (ms. P, BnF français, 1583) according to Knud Togeby. (Note: Though an imperfect copy may be identified in the Saint-Germain-en-Laye fragment (designated ms. S fragment in Arlima.) which was the base ms. for Prévost de Longpérler (1884) La Délivrance d'Ogier le Danois.) Since this work is more than twice the size of Chevalerie Ogier edited by Barrois, this article treats it as a separate work of romance, in accordance with Togeby (Note: Even though manuscript studies still discuss the ABMDP manuscripts regardless of length as variants of the same decasyllabic Chevelerie. Arlima gives ABMDP plus fragment S as variants of Chevelerie en décasyllabes. Barry Cerf also discuss ABMPV as evolution of the same work, though PV is a generation down in the branching scheme (see stemma,).) The longer manuscript is expanded at the beginning by some 1370 verses, enough to indicate that the compiler intended to create "entirely new version of the story". Togeby then lists the suites as "Ogier en Orient" (53 leaves, c. 6900 verses), "Ogier chez la fée Morgue" (17 leaves, c. 2200 verses), and "Retour d"Ogier" (60 leaves, c. 7800 verses.

This reworking develops the plot of Ogier being invited to Avalon by Morgue la Fee (Morgan le Fay). It also introduces the situation of Ogier, preserved in the youth of a 30-year old, returns from Avalon to Paris after 200 years, and is stymied like an idiot. He subsequently loses the fairy ring that maintained his youth and transforms into an old man.

=== Alexandrine Roman d'Ogier ===
Later another remaniement in Alexandrines (dodecasyllables) appeared, designated by Togeby as Roman d'Ogier en Alexandrins (29000vv., mid-14th cent. or c. 1335) (Note: Reworking or "refacimento" was the term employed by Pio Rajna as well as by Paton (rifacimento), equivalent to French remaniement. But this means "reworking", and the term has been indiscriminately applied to other works, not necessarily the Alexandrine version.) of 29,000 verses (Note: For a list of excerpts and summary, see Paton (1903), p. 75 notes 2 and 7.) appeared, datable to c. 1335, extant in three manuscript redactions, (Note: MS. P" or Paris, l'Arsenal 2985 (ant. 190-191), "L" or London, Talbot Shrewsbury Book (MS. Royal 15 E vi.), and "T" or Turin, Biblioteca Nazionale L. IV, 2, (ant. G.I.38).) plus a fourth, (Note: Chantilly 490.) and this too expanded upon the Chevalerie of Raimbert, by adding an Avalon adventure (about 18,000 verses). The Alexandrine version as a whole remains unedited still today, according to the 2015 editors of the first fifteen laisses.

The Alexandrine version represented an intermediate stage between the decasyllabic romance and the later prose rendering. As to lineage, Doon de Mayence's eldest son Gauffroy (var. Gaudeffroy) (Note: Togeby (1969), p. 151 reads Geoffroy or Jeoffroy.) conquered the (supposedly pagan) Danemarche and took the princess Danemonde for his queen (vv. 44–52) (Note: Ogier's mother is named Passerose in Gaufrey.) When she became pregnant she grew so large as if she were carrying two twins, and when she died while delivering Ogier (vv. 89–97). Gauffroy remarries with Germaine de Vanbiz (v. 109) (Note: Thus read in text, but occurs in the notes as Vaubiz [sic]（de Variterbis C, de Baudis L). But the digitalized page at BnF can be consulted.) (Note: Or Togeby (1969), p. 151: Jeoffrey prend une autre femme (à qui texte n'attribue pas de nom), laquelle lui donne un fils, Guion" (Jeoffrey remarries with an unnamed woman)) (compare Belissent in both the expanded decasyllabic (Note: Belissent (var. Helissent), décasyllabes,) and Raimbert's Chevalerie Ogier (Note: Confusingly, in the Alexandrine Belissent is used as the name of castellan's daughter with whom Ogier engages in love, echoed by " Belicène" in Verard's 1498 printed prose romance. Also Belicène in Tressan and Belicene in Bulfinch.)). Here, Ogier's lover is named Guymer, who bears Ogier the son Badouïn out of wedlock. (Note: Alexandrins v. 426, et: "Pour l’amour Baudouïn dont il reçupt dommage,/Qu’en la fille Guymer – il l’ot sens marïage –, 465" v. 464–465.)

In the Alexandrine version, Ogier's fate with Morgan (Morgue) is set in motion while he is still a newborn in his crib. Six fées (fays) visit the baby, each with a gift, and Morgan's gift is longevity and life living with her. (Note: Hist. Litt. France (1842) ascribed the addition of the fairies at Ogier's crib to Italian writers in the XVth century.) As for the other fays, Gloriande promises he shall be the finest knight in Christendom, Sagremoire (Note: Reading emended to Sagremone by modern editors, though not completely outruling Meyer's reading. The digitalized page at BnF can be consulted.) that he shall miss no battle, Foramonde that he be undefeated in combat, another ("white fay with the fleur-de-lis (fee blanche con fleur de liz") fulfillment of love, Beatrix granted him the gift of sweetness and grace. Morgan vowed he would never die until after he becomes her lover. (Note: Quoted from ms. Arsenal, 2985 (olim fr. 190, 191) in Meyer ed. (1875) Brun de la montaigne.) (Note: Paraphrased by Togeby (note he places a ! next to Gloriande). Gloriande is the amiral's daughter and sister of Danemon in ChO. In Tressan, Gloriande is Dannemont's daughter who marries Geoffroy of Denmark and dies giving birth to Ogier, rather than the mother being Danemonde.)

After a further career in the Orient (Acre, Babylone), Ogier is brought by the fay Morgan to Avalon to live with her, as predicted, and a son M[e]urvin is born. Ogier yearns to return to France but centuries have passed (the plot is analyzed in detail under § Contents of the romance below).

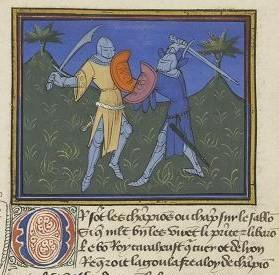
Caraheust against the giant Lagoullafre (l'Engoulaffre (Note: Lagoullafre in poem, Engoulaffre in prose.)) —Romand d'Ogier en Alexandrins, Chantilly ms., f. 192v.

Overall, it is noted that the first half of the Alexandrines reworking is more or less faithful to the original work by Raimbert; one embellishment that does occur in this portion is the love development between Ogier and Didier's queen Aigremonde. (Note: Suard (1969), pp. 57, 58, 60, cf. Bull. Soc. Rencesvals (5)) In the second half, or the continuation portion, Ogier remains an important figure, but is no longer a solo act, as characters such as his nephew Gautier, and Caraheust, reintroduced from Branch I, perform actions of considerable significance in the plot. (Note: Suard (1969) apud Bull. Soc. Rencesvals (5)) In the Alexandrine version, Caraheu's engages in a duel against Lagoullafre (l'Engoulaffre Babillant, cf. image right), and it had been messaged to him by God that should he be victorious, it should be taken as sign he should convert to Christianity.

=== Prose romance in print ===
The prose rendering appeared in the 15th century, and first printed (editio princeps) being the Lyons 1496 edition by Jean de Veral, probably followed y the Paris edition of Antoine Vérard (c. 1498 (Note: Sans date, but date certified by its dedication to Louis XII upon his crowning. But technically, the terminus ante quem is October 1499, and the USTC lists it as [1499].)). There is also a third early printed issue, Paris, Petit Laurens, also sans date, but approximately dated to c. 1495.

For the c. 1498 edition, there are three known copies printed on vellum, of which the Turin copy is particularly luxuriant, and issued as a facsimile edition by Knud Togeby (1967). The Turin exemplar is a presentation copy, printed on vellum instead of paper, and painted with full color miniatures to replace woodcuts at the beginning of each of 57 chapters. It alone has the dedicatory prologue to Louis XII, (Note: Prologue; also transcribed by the Nouveau Repertoire ed. Timelli et al.) which allows for its more or less precise dating to the monarch's crowning 1498, together with a miniature of the genuflecting Vérard presenting the book to the monarch. The copy is held by the Turin National University Library (shelfmark XV.V.183). Some outer quires are handwritten in script resembling typeset to replace some leaves. (Note: So it is partly hand-copied manuscript. Not to be confused with the ms. of Alexandrine poem also held by the same Turin institution.)

There are several other copies extant around the world, (Note: Besides the Turin, Winn (1997), p. 371 lists: Chantilly, MC 1351 (IV. G. 28); Cologne, USB; London, BL IB 41217 (vel); New York, PML ChL f1540; Paris. BN Rés. Vélins 1125 (impf.)) The copy of Henry VII of England (British Library C.22.c.1/IB 41217) is also on vellum, with miniatures in the style of the Master of Jacques de Besançon. The Paris BN copy is on vellum, too. (Note: Cf. miniature of the murder of Baudouinet in the Paris copy of Vérard's prose editions, BNF, Vélins 1125, f. e 1v.) The Pierpont Morgan Library copy in New York is on paper, and bears a [semi-]unique frontispiece (Note: The frontispiece may be unique among Vérard imprints, but it is clearly the same woodcut as the fronticepiece of the Petit Laurens edition (c. 1595/1596).) of Ogier at birth. (Note: This woodcut is reproduced in the Catalog vol. II (1907) as pointed out by Winn, captioned "the cradling of Ogier". Thus this copy 58 illustrations from 13 woodcuts, that is to say, the archetypical scenes of Baudouin's murder and the angel's stoppage of sword are used only once, but the mélée or duel woodcuts are reused several times, or more than dozen times over.)

=== Contents of the romance ===
The fairy-related parts of the Alexandrine romance at the beginning and later laisses were summarized by Keightley (1850) [1828]. Summary of the printed prose have been given by Rodolfo Renier (1891).

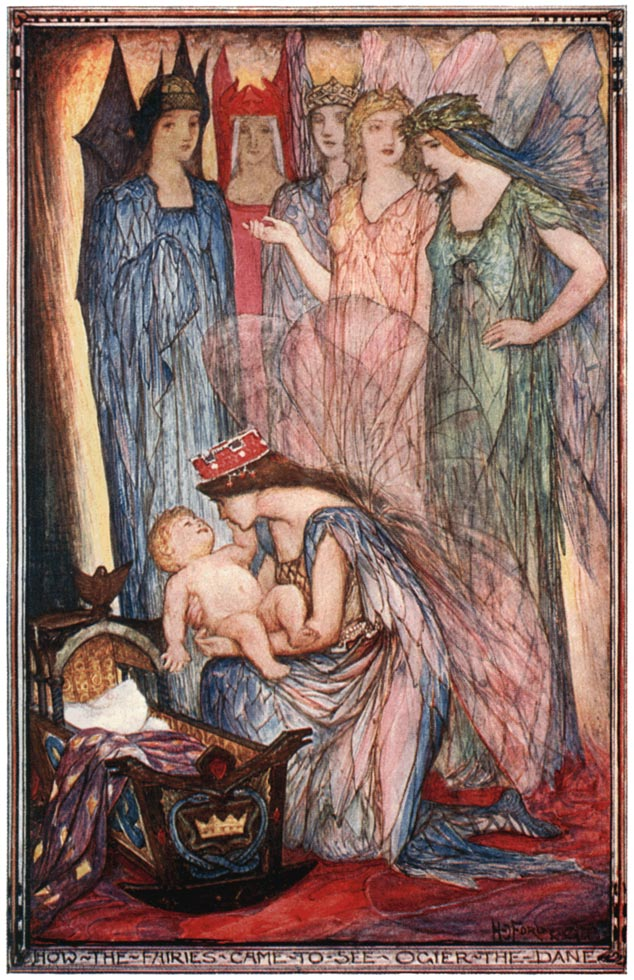
How the Fairies Came to See Ogier the Dane by Henry Justice Ford (1921) "And then the sixth fairy, the youngest and the most beautiful of all, who was none other than Morgan le Fay, the Queen of Avalon, caught up the child, and danced about the room in rapturous joy."

The first chapter of the prose edition names "Gloriande, Palestine, Pharamonde, Melior, Presine, Morgue". (Note: "six belles dames.. lesquelles on nõme faees.. & l'une d'elles nõmee Gloriãde.. Palestine.. Pharamõde.. cinq𐾂esme nõmee Presine.. sixiesme nõmee Morgue", from facsimile.) (Note: However, Togeby states the names occur as "Gloriante, etc. [rest same as above]", and Renier concurs on "Gloriante" spelling where in lieu of giving chapter 1 title, paraphrases its content in Italian.) (Note: In Rigaud (1579) the gift-giving of the six fays are given in the Prologue, pp. 5–6, but the content and the name spellings match.) Ogier's meeting with the fays at birth binds his fate with Morgue/Morgan who becomes his lover in Avalon at a later turn in the prose redaction, as already iterated for the Alexandrine version.

But still while in the mortal world, Ogier has an enhanced career embellished by the romancers. Not only does Ogier save the daughter of the king of England (Note: Vérard ed. (1498) Ch. 30, pp. 354–388) and marries Princess Clarice, (Note: Vérard ed. (1498) Ch. 31, pp. 388–391. Summary by Renier (1891), p. 482) (Note: Vérard ed. (1498) pp. 387–[391]; apud.) (Note: As happens in Chevalerie Ogier, though she is not named.) but Ogier goes to England and becomes its king of England, (Note: Vérard ed. (1498) [Ch. 31] pp. [391]–394; apud) thereafter he visits his younger brother the King Guyon of Denmark and his nephew Gautier. (Note: Vérard ed. (1498) Ch. 31, pp. 388–391; into Ch. 32 [pp. 391–394] (of 391–416)) (Note: Vérard ed. (1498), pp. 387–394 apud Suard (1969), p. 56) However, Ogier having received God's decree to go to Acre and defend it, entrusts the rule of England to Bertrand de Bruyt, but at Charles's court Bertrand pretends Ogier to have perished in an attempt to marry Clarice. Ogier's nephew Gautier arrives to expose the lie, and accepting a duel for justice, (Note: Vérard ed. (1498) Ch. 32, pp. [396–416] of 391–393; Ch. 33, pp. 393–416. Summary by Renier (1891), p. 482) (Note: Vérard ed. (1498), pp. 396–[416]apud Suard (1969), p. 56) wins and the traitor is hanged. (Note: Vérard ed. (1498) Ch. 34, pp. [416–419] of 416–420. Summary by Renier (1891), p. 482) (Note: Vérard ed. (1498), pp. [416]–419 apud Suard (1969), p. 56)

The work enters into the so-called "Ogier en Orient" portion of the suite as described above when Ogier, as anticipated, travels east to succor the Christian cause and eventually accept kingship over Acre. The particulars at beginning can be found in the cited summaries. (Note: Vérard ed. (1498) Ch. 35–37) (Note: Vérard ed. (1498), pp. 396–419; 420-463 apud Suard (1969), p. 56) Ogier arrives in Acre suffering from a great food shortage, wpecifically with the God-given mission to defeat Justamont, but first eliminates King Cormorant. (Note: Vérard ed. (1498) Ch. 35, pp. 420–431; Ch. 36 "Comment Ogier descomfist le roy Cormorant..", pp. 431–446. Summary by Renier (1891), p. 482.) (Note: Vérard ed. (1498), pp. 420-[446] apud Suard (1969), p. 56) Ogier defeats Justamont, a giant and brother of Bruhier (in a vicious fight involving their horses; cf. § Baucent above). But Ysoré (Bruhier's son, Justamont's nephew), Murgalant, and Moysan wage a battle of vengeance, in which King John is killed, and Ogier is elected the new king. (Note: Vérard ed. (1498) Ch. 37 "Comment Ogier saillit d"Acre pour combatre le geant Justamon et comme il le vainquit en champ.. Et comme le roy Jehan fut occis..", pp. 446–463. Summary by Renier (1891), p. 482.) (Note: Vérard ed. (1498), pp. [446]-463; apud Suard (1969), p. 56) However when Ogier seeks to make pilgrimage to the Holy Sepulchre he is tricked by two Knights Templar who lost relatives to Ogier, and Ogier is nearly conveyed into the hands of Isoré, son of Bruhier, who must certainly bear a profound grudge. But the ship goes astray, (Note: Vérard ed. (1498) Ch. 38, pp. 463–490. Summary by Renier (1891), p. 482.) (Note: Vérard ed. (1498), earlier portion of pp. 464–511 apud Suard (1969), p. 56) and Ogier is salvaged by some fisherman. In the foreign land of Babylone, Ogier blackens his face and pretends to be a Moor, and serves as a warrior under Noradin, the soudan of Babylone (Cairo). Ogier captures Engoullaffre (l'Engoulaffre Babillant, another brother of Bruhier. cf. § Alexandrine Roman d'Ogier (Note: Note that Engoullaffre is Lagoulaffre in the Alexandrines, and fought by Caraheust, as in figure above.)), but discovers Christians in Noradin's prison. Ogier reencounters Caraheu among Noradin's generals, who cautions him against the soudan. (Note: Vérard ed. (1498) Ch. 39 "Comment Ogier vanquit l'Engoullaffre en champ..", pp. 490–501. Summary by Renier (1891), pp. 482–483.) (Note: Vérard ed. (1498), middle portion of pp. 464–511 apud Suard (1969), p. 56) Ogier now captures King Moisant/Moysant in battle, but his identity is divulged, and thrown in to prison together with Moisant. (Note: Vérard ed. (1498) Ch. 40 "Comment Ogier print le roy Moysant..", pp. 501–515. Summary by Renier (1891), p. 483.) (Note: Vérard ed. (1498), later portion of pp. 464–511 apud Suard (1969), p. 56)

This supplies the missing prelude to where the surviving portion of the so-called La Délivrance d'Ogier le Danois begins (Note: Touched upon in annotation above re Marchevalée.) (i.e., the imperfect copy of the decasyllabic romance continuation), where Moisant hears the voice of the angel promising his deliverance (that sets up for his later conversion to Christianity (Note: Vérard ed. (1498) Ch. 49, pp. 598–622)). Caraheu discovers Ogier's fate, and fetches an army led by Ogier's nephew Gautier, (Note: Vérard ed. (1498) Ch. 41, pp. 515–519 to Ch. 47, pp. 580–590. Or pp. 511–592) and amidst intertwining plots, (Note: One side story has Ogier's younger brother Guyon leaving Denmark hoping to meet Ogier in Acre but betrayed by the Knights Templar and handed over to the custody of King Murgalant in Jerusalem.) (Note: Another side story is that Gautier is in mutual love with Moysant's daughter Clarette-Clarice ("Clarette" in poem changed to Clarice, but latter confusing with Ogier's wife's name), who gets Christianized.) who finally triumphs and takes the sultan Noradin prisoner, so that he can negotiate Ogier and Moysant's release. (Note: Vérard ed. (1498) Ch. 41., pp. 515–519 to Ch. 49, pp. 598–624 Or pp. 593–622) Gautier, having also captured the sultan's horse Marchevalée, had ridden it and decided it will be a gift to his uncle Ogier, so that when the sultan (Noradin) offers increasingly enormous riches to ransom himself and his horse Marchevalée (escalating to 100 maidens, 100 helms, 100 gyrfalcons, etc. to the hauberk of St. George), the return of his horse is still refused. (Note: Togeby discusses the parallel in the Danish version, where the sultan is named Norandin and the horse he bargains for is Marcewal or Marceual/Marceval.)

Thus this Marchevalée figures in the Alexandrines as the third horse (of four) ridden by Ogier, after Bauchant. It recurs in the prose printed text also, e.g. "marceualee" in the 1579 edition, from which it is seen that its owner is "Soudan Noradin" of Babylone. (Note: This is echoed in the Danish translation, where Holger Danske whose mounts were: "Briford, killed by Sultan Bruher, Bussant, lost on Rhodes, or Sultan Norandin 's Marceval not to mention Holger's last, monstrous and biting horse, who was in reality a transformed king, Papilio".)

Ogier already had a wife Clarice, daughter of the king of England; (Note: Vérard ed. (1498) Ch. 47, chapter heading, and summary.) now she has her baptized and has a marriage ceremony with her in Jerasulem, which the Christians also now control. (Note: Vérard ed. (1498) Ch. 47, pp. 580–590) After seeing to Gautier ruling Babylone, Ogier plans to accompany Caraheu so he can be baptised as Acaire (Note: Suard's summary has "Ogier qui désire accompagner Caraheu, devenu Acaire par le baptême, en Inde" as if Caraheu is already baptized, but Ogier had "given" Caraheu the name Acaire for baptism, which was what Ogier learned through divine revelation ("le nom de Caraheu a son baptesme on le nomma Acaire.. par revelation divine Ogier luy mist ce nom").) but their ships get separated, and while Caraheu carries on with Gloriande, achieves his baptism, and converts his homeland of India, while Ogier's shipmates are all killed, and he drifts on a boat towards the attraction of the magnetic castle of lodestone, called the Castle Avallon (where Morgue/Morgan awaits). (Note: "chasteau d'Aymant qu'on nomme le chasteau d'Auallon"; Keightley (1850), p. 46: "Tant nagea.. chastel daymant.. etc.", etc.) (Note: The Petit Laurens edition (c. 1595) shows a woodcut of the ship, and 2 pages after, the paragraph with drop capital "E", " Et tant nagea.. cahsteau [sic] day-mant quon nomme le chasteau dAuallon" The identical woodcut occurs in the Vérard paper edition.) (Note: Keightley uses "loadstone" spelling, but modern commentator uses standardized "a lodestone reef".)

Ogier becomes Morgan's lover as anticipated, and spends his days in Avalon. He is given the lutin prince-turned-horse (cf. § Papillon) to ride, and in this prose version, ring to maintain the youth of a 30-year old, and a crown of forgetfulness (so he cares no more about the material world). Ogier also assists King Arthur in fairyland by facing the lutin turned monster, Capalu[s]/Chapalu for which cf. Cath Palug § Ogier.

Oblivious to Ogier, in the material world, Noradin and others recover rule over major points in the Orient such as Babylone and Acre. Years pass, and Ogier and Morgan together bear a son named Meurvin (var. Murvin, Marlyn). (Note: Regarding the romance of Meurvin himself in his own right, cf. § Meurvin continuation below.) But after 200 years, the threat to Christendom is adjudged to be so dire, that Morgan lifts Ogier's crown of forgetfulness to restore his memory, and sends him back to aid France.

In the Alexandrine version, Ogier is allowed to France after more than 200 years, sent along with the lutin horse he rode in fairyland, and given a firebrand which must not be allowed to be burnt down for him to remain alive (Note: Ward, loc. cit., notes the firebrand is a motif seen in the legend of Meleager.) (and this is preserved in the prose as well) Ogier arrives during the reign of King Philip, whom he outlives, and when pressed by the king's widow to marry him, whereupon he throws a brand into the fire, and conveyed by cloud back to the mortal world near Montpellier. But the life Ogier tries to forfeit is salvaged by Morgan.

Similarly in the prose, Morgan lets the squire Benoit and the horse Papillon accompany Ogier, and also hands him the firebrand on which his life depends, but the brand plays no role. (Note: "tison". The brand is not mentioned beyond this point.) Morgan carries the party on a cloud, (Note: "sourdit un nuee". Cf. Keightley (1850), p. 50) and deposits them at a large city, which is Montpellier. Ogier thinks he can visit his uncle Girard de Rousillon, but he is long dead, and attempting to convince the people of the current he is really Ogier causes a scuffle that kills Benoit, who is interred at St. Faro's Abbey. The abbot of St. Faro called upon to exorcise the fire-spewing Papillon discover the secret of the youth-giving ring when he admiringly removes it. Ogier succors the king who is besieged at Chartres; Papillon helps by spewing fire and dragons to the marvel of all. The queen makes amorous advances to Ogier which he rebuffs, but while his was dozing off, the queen and Lady Senlis also discovers Ogier will turn into a wrinkled old man with his ring taken off of him. This lady is of age and covets the ring, sending assassins at Ogier. Though the French were faring poorly, Ogier rescues the prisoners, and suggests to the enemy leader Florion to settle the war by close battle. The amiral of Nubia wants to join on their side, and wishes to stipulate Ogier no longer ride Papillon, but Papillon changes color to deceive them. The Saracens are defeated and Florion converts. Ogier is prompted to tell his story, but just as he was about to breach his promise to keep Avalon secret, the ring falls off him, and grew old, while Count Geoffroy who puts it on regains youth, and wants to keep it for good. But Morgan comes to restore the ring to the Dane, and admonishes him not to talk about Avalon again. The conclusion differs slightly here: when the widowed queen presses Ogier to marry him, Ogier seeks the advice of the abbot of St. Faro who assents to the match, but a lady dressed in white (Fay Morgan) spirits Ogier away, and no one knows what has become of him, though people are sure he still lives.

==== Meurvin continuation ====
Meurvin became the subject of a lengthy Renaissance era romance, Roman de Meurvin, fils d'Oger le Danois (1531), where Meurvin via his son Oriant becomes the ancestor of the Swan Knight, Lohengrin. The work, also issued under the title Histoire du Preux et Vaillant Chevalier Meurvin (1540), thus staked the claim that Ogier was an ancestor of Godfrey of Bouillon, the historical crusader king of Jerusalem, who was allegedly descended from the Swan Knight according to the romances.

== Legend in Italy ==
In the beginning of Luigi Pulci (1432-1484)'s verse romance Morgante (1478), Canto I, strophe 17, Ugier il Danese (var. Uggiero, Uggieri il Danese) has his sword Cortana and his horse Rondello stolen by Orlando (Roland) while these were in the keeping of Ugier's wife Ermelina/Ermellina. The beginning potions of this work has been translated by Lord Byron. (Note: The name Rondel[lo] means "swallow", and matches the name of Buovo d'Antona.) Pulci also mentions that authorities other than himself claim Ugier still lives in some sunken cave, fully armed and mounted on a horse, together with the lore that Charlemagne had thrown Orlando's sword Durindana in the water, and the sword rises up above surface on the anniversary of the battle (of Roncesvalles).

== Legend in Scandinavia ==
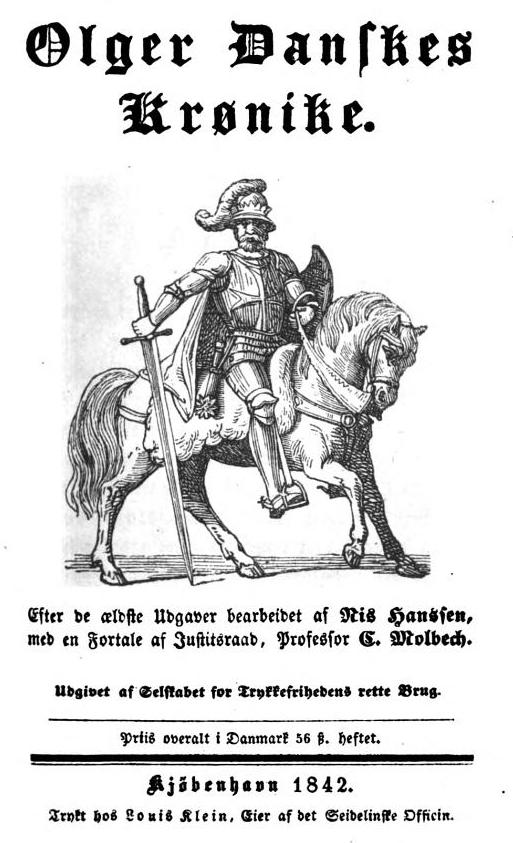
Frontispiece by W. Marstrand, in Hanssen (1842) Olger Danskes Krønike

The early form of the chanson de geste was translated in the 13th century into Old Norse as Oddgeirs þáttr danska ("Short story of Oddgeir danski"), Branch III of the Karlamagnús saga (c. 1240). This third branch of the saga is somewhat similar to Adenet's version, in that it adapts the first branch of the Chevalerie Ogier up to the duel with Brunamont (Old Norse: Brunament) to form the first 45 chapters, but diverges thereafter creating its own ending for the remaining nine chapters.

Later, an early Danish translation or abridgement of most branches of the saga was compiled under the title Karl Magnus krønike (some ms. copies date to 1480).

The 16th-century Olger Danskes krønike was Kristiern Pedersen's Danish translation based on the printed version of the French prose romance Ogier le Danois, which he started while in Paris in 1514–1515, probably completed during his second sojourn in 1527, and printed in 1534 in Malmö. Pedersen also fused the romance with Danish genealogy, thus making Ogier the son of Danish king Gøtrik (Godfred). The Danish version preserves, for example, the prologue of the newborn Ogier being visited by the six fays, except that in Pedersen's version, the fays (Danish: Feer) are replaced by Vetter (sing. vætte, i.e. "wights"). For the most part, the Danish adaptation follows the original French prose closely.

=== Scandinavian ballads ===
The Danish ballad "Holger Danske og Burmand" (DgF 30, TSB E 133) recounts the fight between the hero and Burmand. It exists in four variants (ABCD). (Note: Version A (Karen Brahe's ms.), Grundtvig (1853), pp. 391–393) Burmand is a Mohammedan is caricatured as monstrous, eating the flesh of Christians and drinking their blood in variants B (Note: Version B (Svaning's ms.), Grundtvig (1853), pp. 393–394 in 22 strophes: Str. 11 is translated "He will eat nothing else / than the meat of a Christian man.." by Layer.) (and D (Note: Version D (originally pub. Vedel), Grundtvig (1853), pp. 395–397 in 33 strophes. Str. 19 in D is translated at stanza 17 by Prior as "naught.. will eat, /But flesh from a Christian.." /And nothing will drink.. But blood with a poison blent", where Prior's first 20 stanzas of which is from D.)), and explicitly called a troll in variant D. (Note: Version D, Str. 13 is translated "Troll is here.. and he is called black Burmand" by Layer; placed in stanza 11 by "King Burman, the swarthy trold" by Prior (from D).)

The ballad type is also attested in Swedish (SMB 216) and likewise tells the story of how Holger Dansk is released from prison to fight against a troll by the name of Burman.

=== Hero in art ===
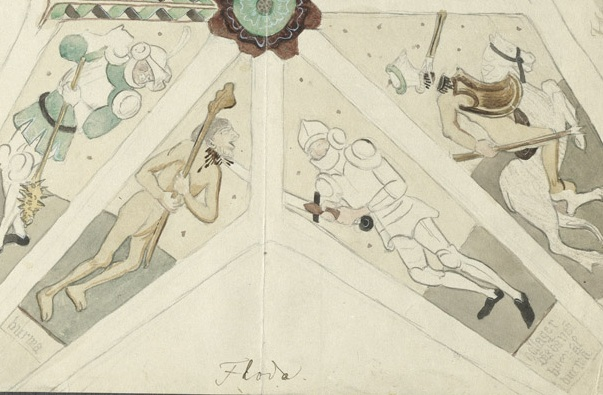
Holger Danske thrusting sword into Burmand. —Watercolor sketch of fresco painting at Floda kyrka church, Sweden.

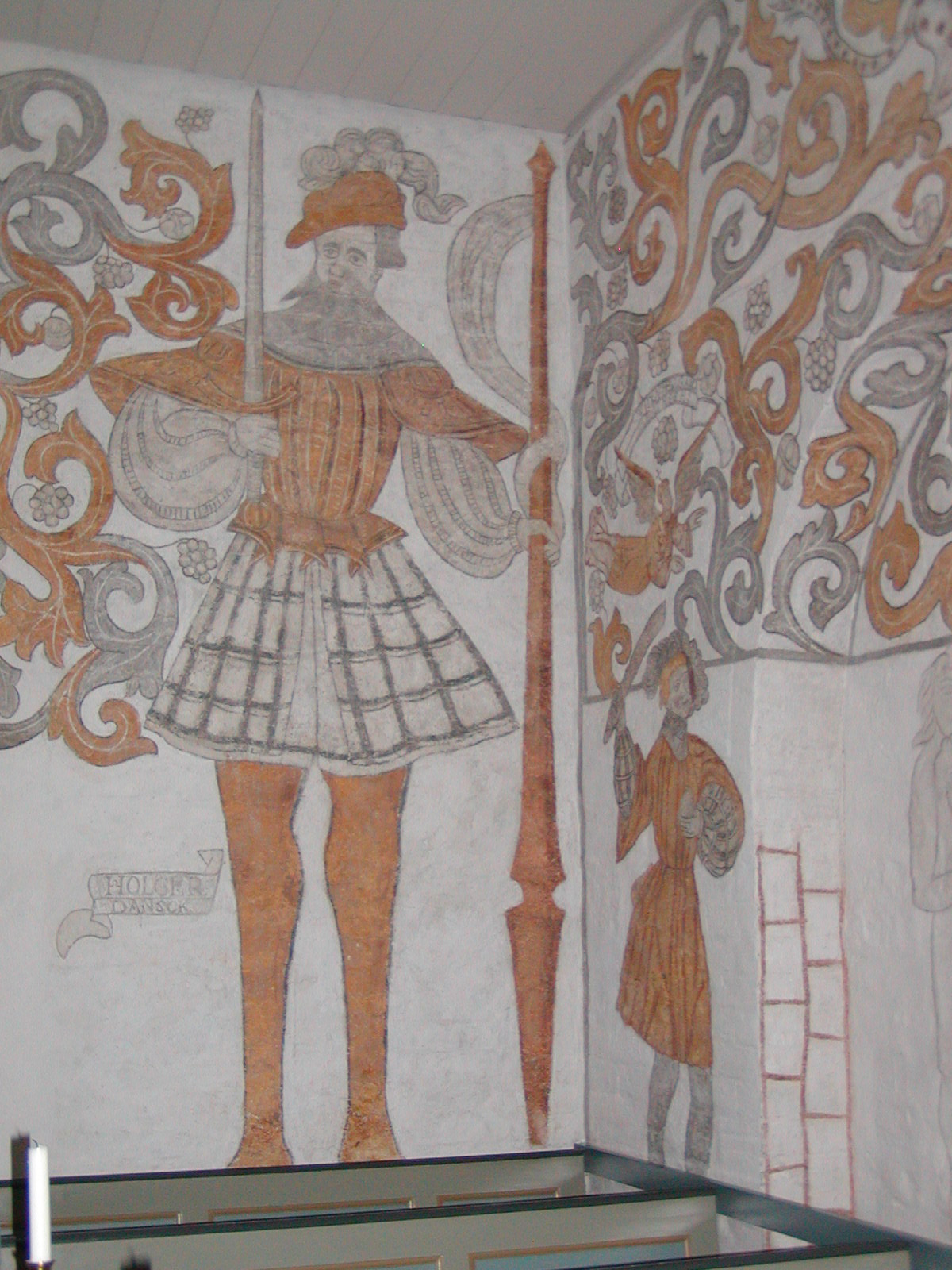
Ogier in a 16th-century mural in Skævinge, Denmark

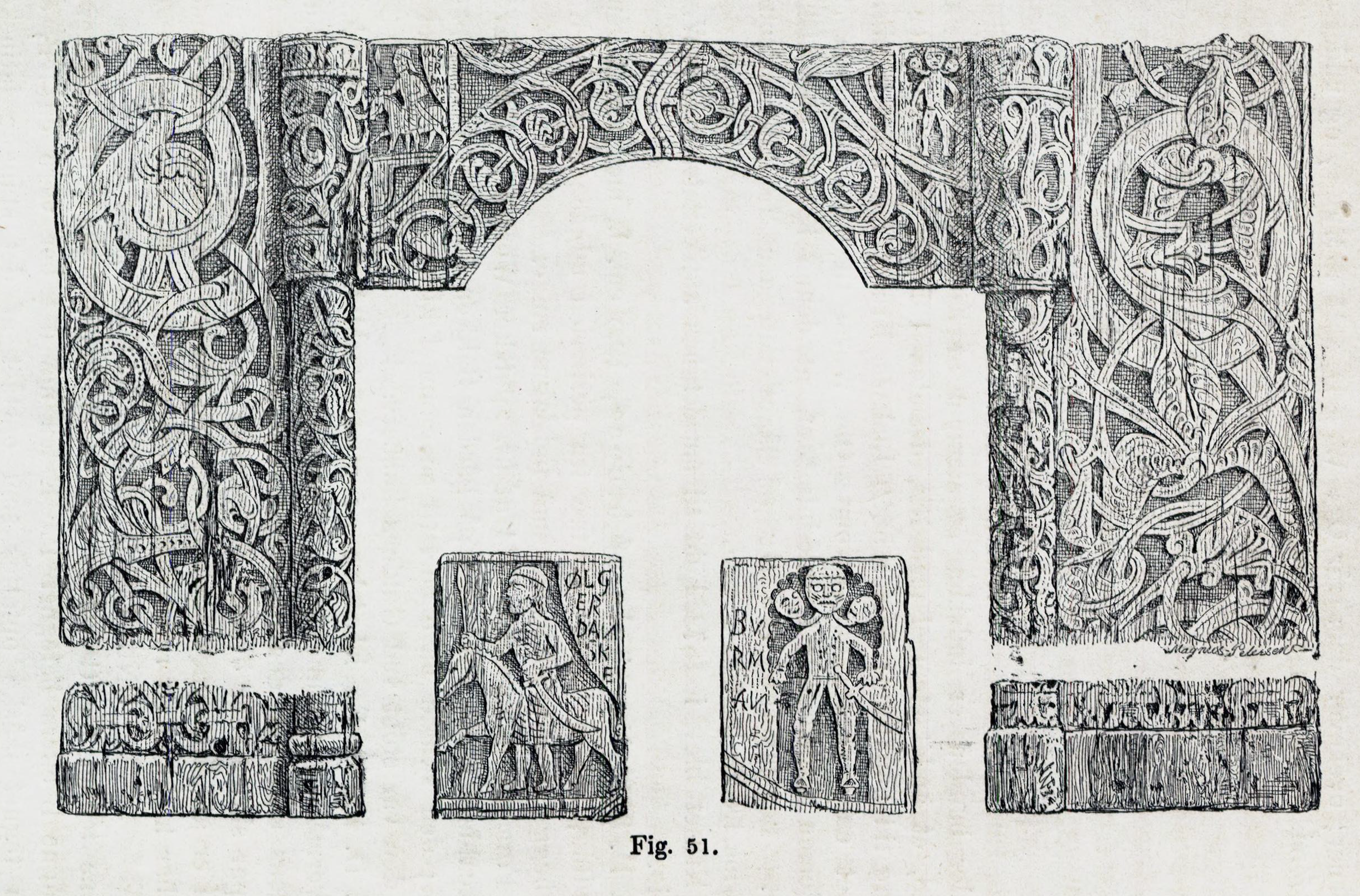
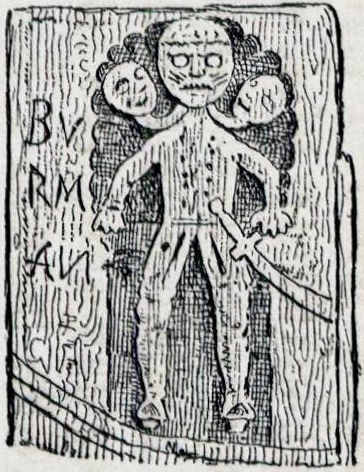
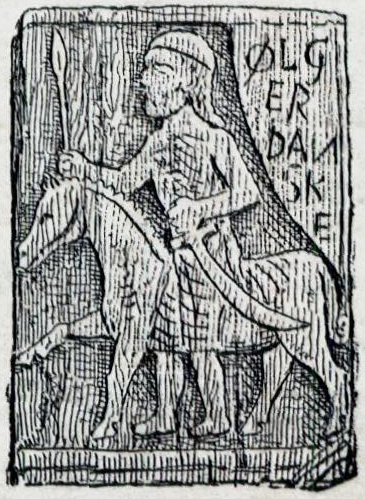
Norwegian stave church portal with Ølger Danske and Burman (enlarged view at center).
—Purchased by Det Kgl. Museum for Nordiske Oldsager in 1861

The hero's popularity led to him being depicted on 15th- and 16th-century paintings in two churches in Denmark and Sweden. The Holger Danske and Burman painted on the ceiling of Floda Church in Sweden are attributed to Albertus Pictor around 1480 (cf. image left). It also includes the text Holger Dane won victory over Burman; this is the burden of the Danish and Swedish ballad, but the painting predates other written texts for this ballad.

There is also an portal removed from an old stave church in Norway, acquired by the then-Det Kgl. Museum for Nordiske Oldsager in 1861 (now part of National Museum of Denmark. There were later additions made to this portal in order to accommodate a wider door, which included labeled carvings of Ølger Danske and Burman (cf. image right). The merchant who sold it purported to be the Reinli Stave Church which he said was long demolished, but this provenance was disputed because that church still stood (and still stands). Nicolaysen guessed it to be from the ruined stave church at Öde (cf. Øyjar Chapel) in Røn parish.

For the plaster sculpture at Kronberg Castle cf. § Kronberg Castle below.

== Literary analysis ==
The motif in the Ogier romance of "life inseparably tied with firebrand", i.e., motif-index "E 765.1.1 life bound up with candle"; or "765.1.2 (torch)" is paralleled by the Norse "Tale of Nornagest".

The motif is also familiar from the classical Greek tale about Meleager.

The connections to the Scottish tradition concerning Thomas the Rhymer's journey to Elphame (Fairyland) and the ballad of Tam Lin have been pointed out, but Francis James Child went so far as to assert these were derivatives of the Ogier romance.

== Modern era ==
=== Kronborg Castle ===
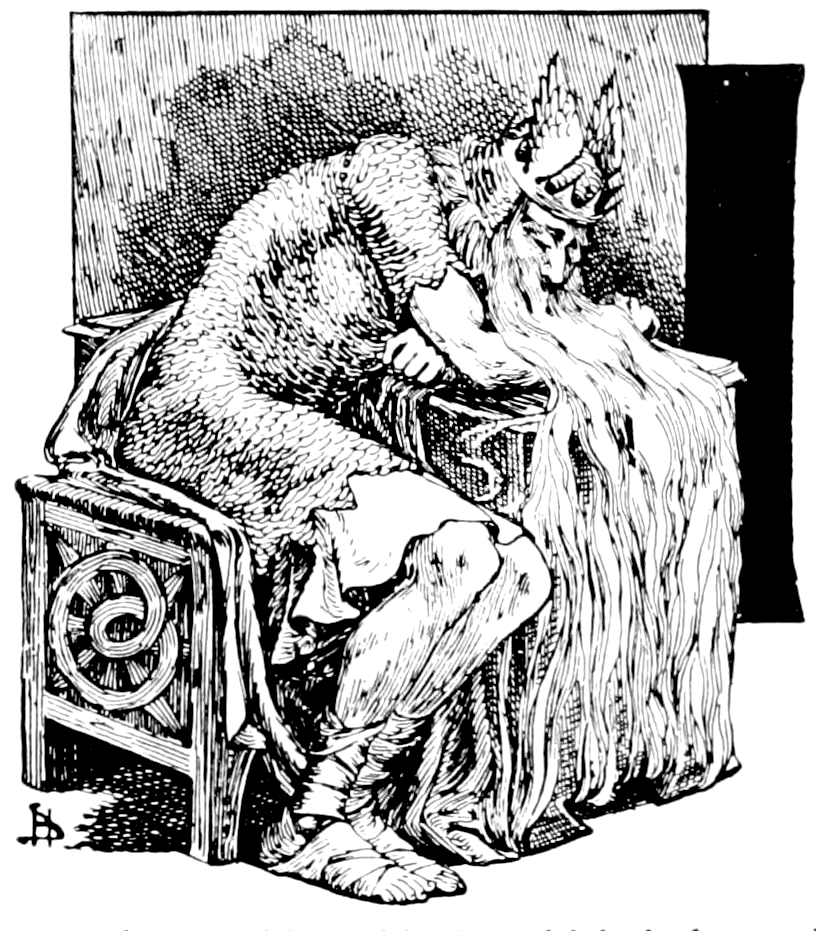
The sleeping Ogier in Helen Stratton's illustration for The Fairy Tales of Hans Christian Andersen (1899)

Ogier in Danish legend is said to dwell in Kronborg Castle, his beard grown down to the floor. He will sleep there until the day when the country of Denmark is in the greatest peril, at which time he will awaken and save the nation. This is a common folklore motif, classed as Type 1960.2, "The King Asleep in the Mountain". Thomas Keightley (1834) records the rumour that the clanging of armour could still be heard "under the castle of Cronberg" [sic].

The legend is described in fuller detail by J. M. Thiele (1843). A condemned criminal (a slave) is sent down to investigate the noise and report his findings, in exchange of pardon. The man finds a group of warriors clad in iron sitting at a table, and the man at the edge (Holger Danske) rises up, breaking the table, for his beard had grown into it. Holger asks the slave for his hand, and the man is clever enough to hold out an iron bar instead, for Holger crushes it, leaving a mark. Impressed (that the slave withstood his clenching handshake), Holger quips "I'm glad there are still men left in Denmark." (Note: Hence the rumour that Holger Danske is not really dead but only sleeping.)

According to the tour guides of Kronborg Castle, legend has it that Holger sat down in his present location after walking all the way from his completed battles in France. It was popularized by the short story "Holger Danske" written by Hans Christian Andersen in 1845.

The Hotel Marienlyst in Helsingør commissioned a statue of Holger Danske in 1907 from the sculptor Hans Peder Pedersen-Dan. The bronze statue was outside the hotel until 2013, when it was sold and moved to Skjern. The bronze statue was based on an original in plaster. The plaster statue was placed in the vaults at Kronborg Castle, also in Helsingør, where it became a popular attraction in its own right. The plaster statue was replaced by a concrete copy in 1985.

=== Dormant Holger elsewhere ===
Thiele gives other versions and similar legends about Holger elsewhere, e.g., that he sits in wait under Møgeltønder waiting for a time when Christendom is in need.

Another version is attached to the slopes of Rönneberga backar outside Landskrona in south Sweden (formerly a part of Denmark), an excavated burial mound found was named Höljer Danskes hög ("Holger Danske's hill"), and legends says Holger who was once king sits in the middle of it.

=== Other Danish folktales ===
Popular legend has it that whenever the Danish military is in dire need, Holger Danske will appear with his red shield at the forefront to lead the troops, Holger having gained immortality or an incorruptible body after partaking of a certain fruit in India.

One tall tale of Holger Danske's gigantic stature tells of his visit to Bagsværd (Note: Spelt "Bagsvœr". Located in North Zealand and now part of Greater Copenhagen.) to have a new suit of clothing made, but he was so gigantic, men had to stand on ladders to measure him. One of the tailors accidentally clipped Holger's ear with his scissor while trying to make a measuring-mark, and Holger who felt tickled mistook this to be a flea bite and crushed the unlucky man.

Another giant tale asserts that a certain witch gave Holger Danske a pair of spectacles (eyeglasses) that could see through the earth. When Holger lay flat on the ground and used it, it left two deep holes that filled up with water, and became a landmark near Copenhagen.

=== Danish patriotic works and resistance movement ===
The 1789 opera Holger Danske, composed by F.L.Æ. Kunzen with a libretto by Jens Baggesen, had a considerable impact on Danish nationalism in the late 18th century. It spawned the literary "Holger feud", which revealed the increasing dissatisfaction among the native Danish population with the German influence on Danish society. Danish intellectual Peter Andreas Heiberg joined the feud by writing a satirical version entitled Holger Tyske ("Holger the German") ridiculing Baggesen's lyrics. Ogier is also regarded as the symbol of national identity in Bernhard Severin Ingemann's 1837 epic poem Holger Danske.

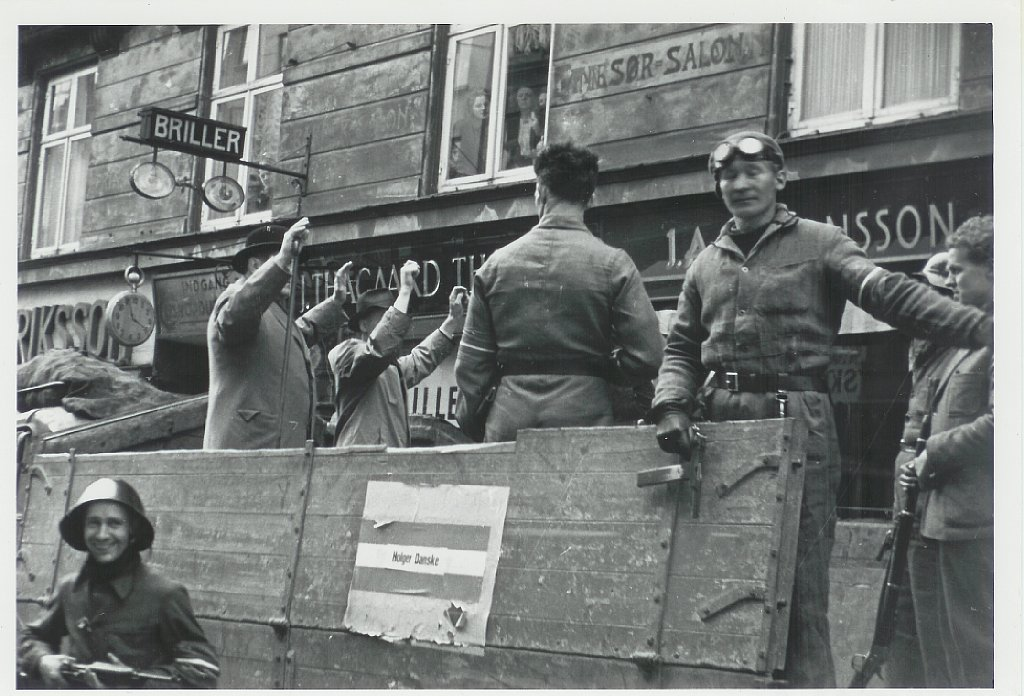
Holger Danske members arresting suspected Danish collaborators during the Liberation of Denmark

During the 1940-1945 German occupation of Denmark, a patriotic presentation of Kunzen's opera in Copenhagen became a manifestation of Danish national feeling and opposition to the occupation. The largest armed group of the Danish resistance movement in World War II, Holger Danske, was named after the legend.

=== Other modern culture ===
- G. K. Chesterton's The Ballad of the White Horse (1911) includes a character named Ogier the Dane as one of the chiefs among Danes attacking Wessex. Similarly, 'Ogier the Dane' is the archetypal name used to signify Danish invaders who have overrun Sussex in Rudyard Kipling's poem "The Land" (1916).
- Ogier is the protagonist of The Viking (1951) by Edison Marshall, where he is portrayed as the child of Ragnar Lodbrok via his rape of the Northumbrian noblewoman Enid, mother of Aella of Northumbria; his chief rival is his paternal half-brother Hastein.
- The protagonist of Poul Anderson's fantasy novel Three Hearts and Three Lions (1961), WWII Danish resistance member named Holger Carlsen, time warps and discovers that he is Ogier of the legend.
- There has been a ferry named MS Holger Danske. It is featured in Per Petterson's novel I Curse the River of Time (2001). (Note: Translated into English by Charlotte Barslund from the Norwegian. The ferry sails between Norway and Denmark.)
- There is an Ogier story event in the strategy video game Crusader Kings II.
- Vernon Lee's short story "A Wicked Voice" posits an opera called Ogier the Dane which the lead character Magnus attempts to finish under duress.

== See also ==
- Otger Cataló, a legend in Catalonia
