= Otakar =

Otakar is a Czech masculine given name. It was derived from the German name Ottokar, which was derived from the medieval Germanic name Audovacar. Notable people with the name include:

== Arts and entertainment ==
- Otakar Brousek Sr. (1924–2014), Czech actor
- Otakar Bystřina (1861–1931), pen name for a Czech writer and lawyer
- Otakar Černý (1943–2021), Czech sports journalist and TV presenter
- Otakar Diblík (1929–1999), Czech industrial designer
- Otakar Hollmann (1894–1967), Czech pianist
- Otakar Jeremiáš (1892–1962), Czech composer, conductor and pedagogue
- Otakar Lebeda (1877–1901), Czech painter
- Otakar Kraus (1909–1980), Czech-British opera singer and pedagogue
- Otakar Kubín (1883–1969), Czech painter and sculptor
- Otakar Mařák (1872–1939), Czech opera singer
- Otakar Ostrčil (1879–1935), Czech composer and conductor
- Otakar Sedloň (1885–1973), Czech painter
- Otakar Ševčík (1852–1934), Czech violinist and pedagogue
- Otakar Šín (1881–1943), Czech composer, theoretician and pedagogue
- Otakar Slavík (1931–2010), Czech painter and draughtsman
- Otakar Španiel (1881–1955), Czech sculptor and engraver
- Otakar Švec (1892–1955), Czech sculptor
- Otakar Vávra (1911–2011), Czech film director, screenwriter and pedagogue
- Otakar Zich (1879–1934), Czech composer and aesthetician

== Sports ==
- Otakar Hemele (1926–2001), Czech footballer
- Otakar Hořínek (1929–2015), Czech sport shooter
- Otakar Janecký (born 1960), Czech ice hockey player
- Otakar Kouba (1906–?), Czech canoeist
- Otakar Lada (1883–1956), Czech fencer
- Otakar Mareček (1943–2020), Czech rower
- Otakar Německý (1902–1967), Czech Nordic skier
- Otakar Nožíř (1917–2006), Czech footballer
- Otakar Škvajn (1894–1941), Czech footballer
- Otakar Švorčík (1886–1955), Czech fencer
- Otakar Vejvoda (born 1972), Czech ice hockey player
- Otakar Vindyš (1884–1949), Czech ice hockey player

== Other ==
- Otakar Batlička (1895–1942), Czech adventurer, journalist and resistance fighter
- Otakar Borůvka (1899–1995), Czech mathematician
- Otakar Hostinský (1847–1910), Czech historian and musicologist
- Otakar Hromádko (1909–1983), Czech journalist and military leader
- Otakar Jaroš (1912–1943), Czech military leader
- Otakar Motejl (1932–2010), Czech lawyer and politician
- Otakar Odložilík (1899–1973), Czech historian and archivist
- Otakar Pertold (1884–1965), Czech Indologist, religious studies historian and ethnologist

== See also ==
- Ottokar I of Bohemia, king of Bohemia (Czech: Přemysl Otakar I.)
- Ottokar II of Bohemia, king of Bohemia (Czech: Přemysl Otakar II.)
- Otakars, medieval dynasty in Styria
- Ottakar's, bookshop chain
