= Audovacar =

Masculine Germanic given name

Audovacar (from Proto-Germanic *Audawakraz) is a masculine Germanic name.

Composed of the roots aud- (wealth) and -wakar (awake), it may be translated "warden of riches" or "watchman of property" and is a kenning for lord. The name is attested in many variations. The first root may appear as Aut-, Ad-, Ud-, Od-, Ot- or Oth- and is attested as a name on its own, Aud, in the 3rd century AD. The name Otto is a derivative.

The medieval German form was Ottokar, whence the Czech form Otakar. The Czech name Žiroslav (Polish Żyrosław) has the same meaning. The Greek name Plutarch also means "lord of wealth".

== Attested forms ==
These forms are mentioned in Dopsch 1980.

- Audacar
- Audacrus
- Audaccrus
- Audgarius
- Audagarius
- Autcharius
- Aotackar
- Odowakar
- Odakar
- Odacrus
- Otachar
- Otacar
- Otacarus
- Otakar
- Otgarius
- Otgar
- Otger
- Othgar
- Otkger

== Famous people ==
- Adovacrius (5th century), Saxon leader in Gaul
- Odoacer (d. 493), barbarian king of Italy
- Autchar (8th century), Frankish diplomat
- Eadwacer, character from the 9th-century Old English poem "Wulf and Eadwacer"

== Bibliography ==
- Boiché, Olga Khallieva (2018). "Old English ead in Anglo-Saxon Given Names: A Comparative Approach to Anglo-Saxon Anthroponomy". In Peter Petré; Hubert Cuyckens; Frauke D'hoedt (eds.). Sociocultural Dimensions of Lexis and Text in the History of English. John Benjamins. pp. 15–40. doi:10.1075/cilt.343.01boi.
- Dopsch, Heinz (1980). "Die steirischen Otakare: Zu ihrer Herkunft und ihren dynastischen Verbindungen" (PDF). In Gerhard Pferschy (ed.). Das Werden der Steiermark. Die Zeit der Traungauer. Frestschrift zur 800. Wiederkehr der Erhebung zum Herzogtum. pp. 75–139.
