= Hoger =

Hoger is a German male name (from Latin Hogerus) and a surname. Notable people with the name include:

== Given name ==
- Hoger (abbot) (died 906), abbot of Verden and Helmstedt

== Surname ==
- Hannelore Hoger (1942–2024), German actress and director
- Sam Hoger (born 1980), US mixed martial artist

== See also ==
- Höger (surname)
