= Friedrich Ludwig Æmilius Kunzen =

German composer and conductor

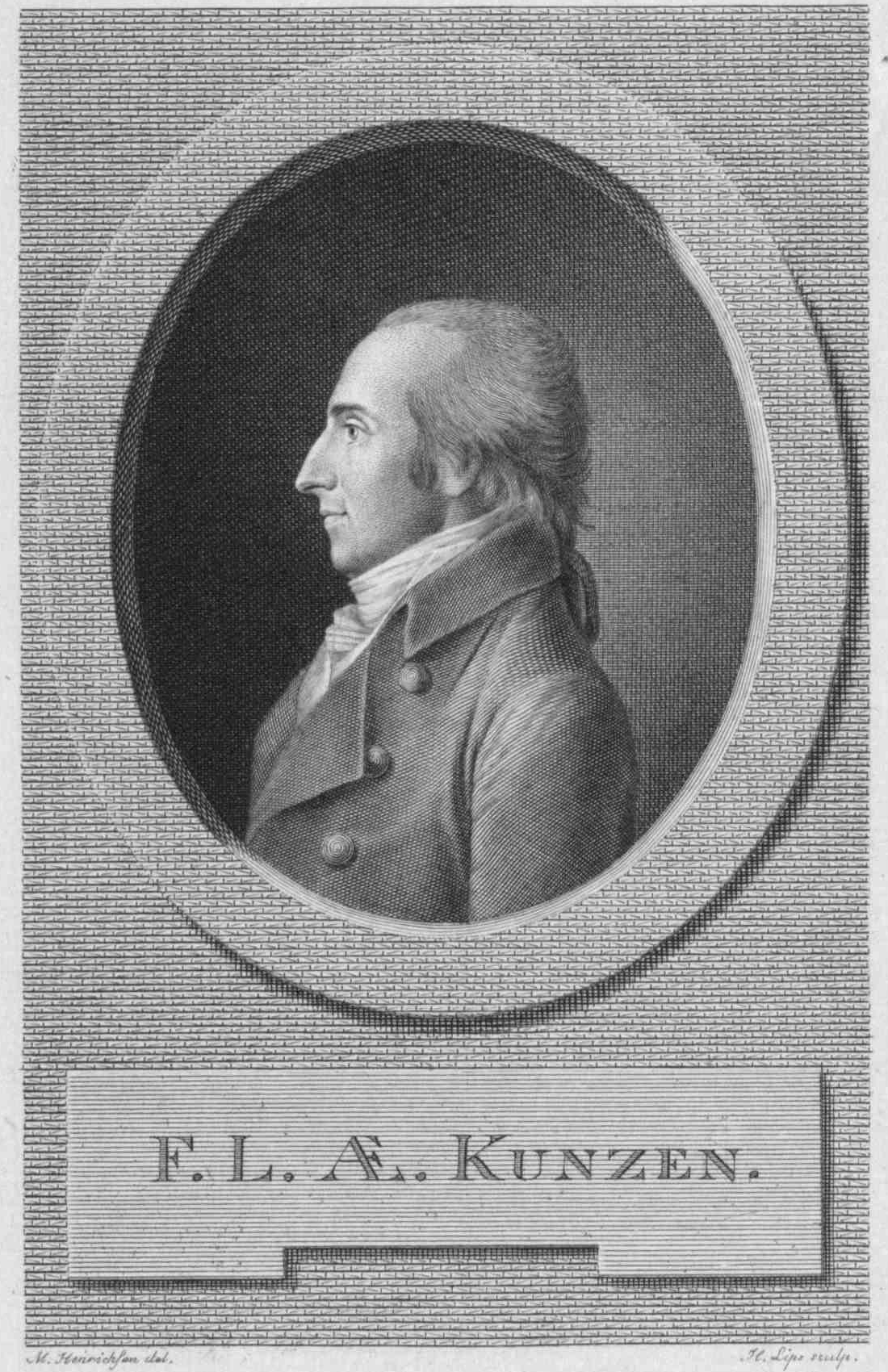
Engraving of Kunzen by Johann Heinrich Lips

Friedrich Ludwig Æmilius Kunzen (24 September 1761 – 28 January 1817) was a German composer and conductor who lived and worked for much of his life in Denmark.

== Life ==
He was born in Lübeck, where his father, Adolph Carl Kunzen, was an organist and his grandfather, Johann Paul Kunzen (1696-1757), had composed for the Hamburg Opera in the 1720s. In 1781 he began studying law in Kiel, but his true love was music, and in 1784, encouraged by composer Johann Abraham Peter Schulz, he moved to Copenhagen to pursue a musical career.

He performed as a pianist at court and in clubs, and in the next few years had successes with a memorial cantata for Count Otto Thott and music for the marriage of Crown Princess Louise Auguste to Frederik Christian II, Duke of Augustenborg, as well as theatre music. In 1788 he met the young author Jens Baggesen, and the two collaborated on the opera Holger Danske, which premiered the following year, causing the "Holger Feud," as a result of which Kunzen temporarily left the country. For the next two years he lived in Berlin.

From 1792 until 1794 he worked as musical director of the new Frankfurter National-Theater, where he put on Mozart's Don Giovanni and The Magic Flute. During his stay in Frankfurt he married one of the foremost singers of the era, Johanna Margaretha Antonetta Zuccarini (1766-1842).

In 1794 he and his wife moved to Prague, where he worked as an opera director; the following year he was offered the position of musical director of the Royal Orchestra in Copenhagen; he immediately accepted and returned with his wife to his beloved city in 1795. His obligations were numerous, his salary poor, and his enthusiasm about Mozart was met with indigenous scepticism. As a consequence, Cosi fan tutte failed spectacularly in 1798. However, he had successes with Don Giovanni (1807) and Die Entführung aus dem Serail (1813).

Aside from an occasional composition for the court and city, he composed the oratorio Opstandelsen (The Resurrection, 1796), the grand opera Erik Ejegod (1798), and various hymns and Singspiele. In 1809, he was appointed professor, and in 1811 he was honoured as a Knight of the Order of the Dannebrog and appointed a member of the Royal Swedish Academy of Music. On 28 January 1817, he suffered a stroke and died after an argument with Jens Baggesen over a plagiarism controversy concerning the opera Trylleharpen (The Magic Harp), which had been performed in 1806 in Vienna and Hamburg in German as Ossians Harfe, but without success.
