= Ottokar =

Ottokar is the medieval German form of the Germanic name Audovacar.

People with the name Ottokar include:

- Two kings of Bohemia, members of the Přemyslid dynasty
  - Ottokar I of Bohemia (c. 1155–1230)
  - Ottokar II of Bohemia (c. 1223–1278)
- Four Styrian margraves, members of the Otakar dynasty
  - Ottokar I of Styria (died 1075)
  - Ottokar II of Styria (died 1122)
  - Ottokar III of Styria (died 1164)
  - Ottokar IV, Duke of Styria (1163–1192)
- Ottokar Chiari (1853–1918), Austrian laryngologist
- Ottokar Czernin (1872–1932), Austro-Hungarian diplomat
- Ottokar Domma (1924–2007), German journalist and writer
- Ottokar Fischer (1873–1940), Austrian magician
- Ottokar Lorenz (1832–1904), Austrian-German historian and genealogist
- Ottokar Nováček (1866–1900), Austro-Hungarian violinist
- Ottokár Prohászka (1858–1927), Hungarian Roman Catholic theologian and bishop
- Ottokar Runze (1925–2018), German film producer
- Ottokar Tumlirz (1856–1928), Austrian physicist
- Ottokar Weise (fl. 1900), German Olympic sailor

Fictional characters

- King Ottokar IV of Syldavia, from the Tintin comic book King Ottokar's Sceptre
- The prince in Carl Maria von Weber's opera Der Freischütz

== See also ==
- Otakar
- King Ottocar: His Rise and Fall, a play by Franz Grillparzer
