= Autchar =

Autchar (also Otachar or Otgar) was a Frankish nobleman. He served Pippin III as a diplomat in 753 and followed Carloman I after the division of the kingdom in 768. In 772, refusing to accept Carloman's brother Charlemagne as king, he went into exile in the Lombard kingdom with Carloman's widow and sons. He was captured when Charlemagne invaded the kingdom in 773. His role in the fall of the Lombard kingdom was the subject of legendary embellishment a century later and in the chansons de geste he evolved into the figure of Ogier the Dane.

== Family ==
Autchar belonged to a Frankish family long established around Mainz in the Rhineland, and which by 750 was active around the Tegernsee in Bavaria. It is not known to which branch of the family Autchar belonged, but it was probably the Bavarian one. The surviving sources do not allow a full reconstruction of the family's relationships, and it is not even possible to identify how many distinct persons were named Autchar, a common name.

In 762 or 765, an Autchar, with his brother Adalbert, founded Tegernsee Abbey in Bavaria. The same brothers also founded the monastery of Sankt Pölten after the defeat of the Avars in 791. It is not certain, however, that this Autchar is the duke.

Duke Autchar may have been related to Archbishop Wilchar. Both served Carloman and both had trans-Alpine careers.

== Career ==
Autchar first appears in a source in 751 acting alongside Abbot Fulrad.

Autchar was one of Pippin III's most trusted men. In the late summer or early fall of 753, Autchar and Bishop Chrodegang were sent to Rome to escort Pope Stephen II back to Francia for negotiations with Pippin. This was the second embassy that year. The first, led by Abbot Droctegang in the spring, had elicited a letter from the pope addressed to Pippin, his sons and "those glorious men, our sons, all the dukes of the people of the Franks". The mission of Duke Autchar was a response to the pope's request. Autchar and Chrodegang arrived in Rome just as Stephen was preparing to go to Pavia to negotiate with the Lombard king Aistulf. They left with him for Pavia and ultimately Francia on 14 October.

Autchar took part in Pippin's invasion of the Lombard kingdom in 756. In 760, Pope Paul I referred to him as a "most glorious duke" (gloriosissimus dux). After Pippin's death in 768, Autchar served Carloman until the latter's death on 4 December 771. In 769, Carloman sent Autchar to the court of Duke Tassilo III of Bavaria on a "fact-finding mission" and the duke accompanied Tassilo on a visit to the court of the Lombard king, Desiderius. At Bolzano, on the return trip to Bavaria, Autchar subscribed as a witness to Tassilo's charter of foundation for Innichen Abbey.

On Carloman's death, rather than join the magnates led by Archbishop Wilchar in doing homage to Charlemagne, Autchar went into exile in Italy along with Carloman's widow, Gerberga, and his two sons. The exiles, probably including other Carloman loyalists, initially stayed at the royal court in Pavia, where may have arrived as early as February 772. They may have hoped, as King Desiderius did, that the pope would anoint Carloman's son's as kings.

Autchar accompanied Desiderius later in 772 when he marched on Rome in an attempt to force the pope's hand. According to the Liber pontificalis, when he had gotten as far as Viterbo, Pope Adrian I sent emissaries to warn that "neither he, nor any of the Lombards, nor Autchar the Frank either" should enter papal territory again on pain of excommunication. Autchar also accompanied the Lombard army when Desiderius went out to meet the Frankish army when Charlemagne crossed the Alps in 773. When the army of Bernard appeared to their rear, the Lombards and Autchar retreated to Pavia. According to the Liber pontificalis, however, Desiderius' son Adelchis took "Autchar the Frank and Carloman's wife and sons with him and entered Verona, because that city is the strongest of all the Lombards' cities." Only after he began besieging Pavia did Charlemagne learn that the exiles were at Verona. According to the Liber pontificalis, Charlemagne led a small band of specially picked troops to Verona and "as soon as he got there, Autchar and Carloman's wife and sons immediately handed themselves over of their own free wills". Autchar may have arranged the surrender of Verona at the same time. He seems to have either subsequently escaped or been released, for he was with Desiderius in Pavia when the Lombards surrendered. According to the Chronicle of Moissac, Charlemagne then sent him into exile.

Autchar had been restored to favour by 778. He may have been the count of the land between the Enns and the Vienna Woods. If he was the same Autchar who founded Sankt Pölten after 791, he was probably also the commander, alongside Graman, of the victorious army against the Avars at the battle of the Ybbsfeld in 788. He would have been an old man by that time.

== Legend ==
Autchar was already the subject of legends when Notker the Stammerer wrote his Gesta Karoli (Deeds of Charles) in the 880s. Otkerus, as Notker spells his name, climbs the highest tower in Pavia with King Desiderius as the siege begins. The kings keeps asking if Charlemagne has arrived as the army surrounding them grows. Otkerus keeps answer "not yet" until finally a thunderstorm heralds Charlemagne's arrival. Although the exchange with Desiderius is a piece of storytelling, Notker's description of Autchar as "a military expert and very well-acquainted with strategy and the composition of the siege trains" is likely accurate.

== Bibliography ==
- Bachrach, Bernard (2013). Charlemagne's Early Campaigns (768–777): A Diplomatic and Military Analysis. Brill.
- Barbero, Alessandro (2004) [2000]. Charlemagne: Father of a Continent. Translated by Allan Cameron. University of California Press.
- Bowlus, Charles R. (1985). "Prosopographical Evidence Concerning Moravia's Location". Medieval Prosopography. 6 (1): 1–21. JSTOR 45015423.
- Bowlus, Charles R. (1995). Franks, Moravians, and Magyars: The Struggle for the Middle Danube, 788–907. University of Pennsylvania Press.
- Brunner, Karl (1979). Oppositionelle Gruppen im Karolingerreich. Böhlau.
- Dequin, Horst F. E. (1996). Otakar, Gegenspieler und Getreuer Karls des Großen: Personengeschichtliche und genealogische Beiträge zur Reichsgeschichte von den Merowingern bis zu den Ottonen. Westerhorn.
- Dopsch, Heinz (1980). "Die steirischen Otakare: Zu ihrer Herkunft und ihren dynastischen Verbindungen" (PDF). In Gerhard Pferschy (ed.). Das Werden der Steiermark. Die Zeit der Traungauer. Frestschrift zur 800. Wiederkehr der Erhebung zum Herzogtum. pp. 75–139.
- Fried, Johannes (2016) [2013]. Charlemagne. Translated by Peter Lewis. Harvard University Press.
- Kats, J. M. J. G.; Claszen, D. (2012). Chronicon Moissiacense Maius: A Carolingian World Chronicle From Creation until the First Years of Louis the Pious (MA thesis). Leiden University.
- McKitterick, Rosamond (2008). Charlemagne: The Formation of a European Identity. Cambridge University Press.
- Nelson, Janet L. (2019). King and Emperor: A New Life of Charlemagne. Penguin.
- Noble, Thomas F. X. (1984). The Republic of St. Peter: The Birth of the Papal State, 680–825. University of Pennsylvania Press.
- Partner, Peter (1972). The Lands of St. Peter: The Papal State in the Middle Ages and the Early Renaissance. University of California Press.
- Zöllner, Erich (1945–46). "Zur Bedeutung der älteren Otachare für Salzburg, St. Pölten und Wien". Neues Jahrbuch der Heraldisch-genealogischen Gesellschaft: 21–39.
