= Otakar Pertold =

Otakar Pertold (born in Jaroměř 21 March 1884, died 3 May 1965 in Prague) was a Czech Indologist, religious studies historian and ethnologist, generally considered the pioneer of Asian religious studies in Czechoslovakia. From 1934, he was Professor of Religious Studies at Charles University. A member of many learned bodies, he was a prolific author and among English readers is best known for his work on Sri Lanka.
