= Höger =

Höger is a German surname. Notable people with the surname include:

- Inge Höger (born 1950), German politician
- Johann Friedrich Höger (1877–1949), German architect
- Karel Höger (1909–1977), Czech film actor
- Karl Höger (1897–1975), German footballer and coach
- Marco Höger (born 1989), German footballer
- Rudolf Alfred Höger (1877–1930), Austrian painter

== See also ==
- Werner Hoeger (born 1954), American scientist
