= Holger Danske (opera) =

Opera by Friedrich Ludwig Æmilius Kunzen

Holger Danske (lit. Ogier the Dane) is the title of a 1789 Syngespil opera based on the Oberon myth, with music by F.L.Æ. Kunzen and a Danish libretto by Jens Baggesen.

== Synopsis ==
The opera is set in the time of Charlemagne, and the action revolves around the quarrel of Oberon, King of the Fairies, and Titania, Queen of the Sylphs. They have sworn an oath that they will reconcile only if they can find a human couple who will remain true to each other despite all perils and temptations; after centuries of painful separation, they find this couple in young prince Holger, one of Charlemagne's knights, and Rezia, the daughter of Sultan Buurman in Baghdad. Holger has killed one of Charlemagne's sons in self-defense, and his punishment is to cut off a lock of the sultan's beard and kiss his daughter in public.

Act One opens with Oberon singing of his longing for Titania. Then Holger and his squire Kerasmin, in a forest in Lebanon, meet Oberon, who promises Holger his help and gives him a magic horn that can force others to dance; Holger tries it on Kerasmin to punish him for his hard words about Oberon. Then the two travel on to Babylon. The act ends with Rezia awakening from a dream in which Holger appears to her as her true bridegroom; she is in despair, because that day she is to marry Langulaffer, Prince of the Lebanon.

Act Two begins in Buurman's palace, where the marriage of his daughter is about to be celebrated; Holger and Kerasmin interrupt the ceremony, Holger and Rezia recognize each other from their dreams and embrace joyfully; a fight breaks out, and Kerasmin blows the horn and forces everyone to dance ecstatically until they drop from exhaustion, at which point Holger snips a lock from Buurman's beard, and Oberon appears and drives the Turks away.

Act Three opens with Titania lamenting her separation from Oberon; she has a vision of Holger and Rezia being menaced by death. Three fairies enter and report that the ship that was to take the young couple to Europe had been wrecked on the coast of Tunis, where they were sold as slaves to the court of the Sultan Bobul. Holger is working as a gardener for the Sultana Almansaris, who tries unsuccessfully to seduce him and angrily tells her guard to take him to be burned at the stake. Meanwhile, Rezia, now called Palmine and part of the sultan's harem, fights off his advances and says she would rather die in flames than submit. The two are chained together and about to be burned in the public square, but Oberon and Titania appear and free the pair, and Holger once more uses the horn to make his enemies dance until they are helpless. Both fairy and human couples are united at last, and the opera ends with a chorus of joy.

== Holger Feud and the opera's later history ==
Holger Danske is now considered one of the masterpieces of Danish opera, but when it opened on 31 March 1789 it sparked off a heated controversy, the "Holger Feud," having nothing to do with the merits of the opera itself. There had been considerable tension over the influence and attitudes of Germans in Denmark since the rise and fall of Johann Friedrich Struensee almost two decades earlier; nationalists like the leading reviewer Knud Lyhne Rahbek attacked Baggesen and his German collaborator, and opponents of opera in general like the witty satirist Peter Andreas Heiberg joined in.

Baggesen was so unnerved by the attacks that he requested the opera be withdrawn after only six performances, and he and Kunzen left the country; though both returned and had success in Denmark later, the opera was never again performed in their lifetimes, to the distress of critics like Peter Grønland, who in 1792 praised the opera highly and said he could not understand why it was "no longer performed." Ole Kongsted writes of the later fate of the opera:

"One performance of the first act at a Royal Orchestra Widows' Pension Fund concert in 1804 made no impact, and the opera was never again part of the repertoire of the Royal Theatre. The work lay hidden away until Kunzen's biographer Martienssen had it performed in 1912 at the Cecilia Society.

Then it was forgotten again until it was performed a few times at the Royal Theatre in 1941; Poul Kanneworff directed, Harald Lander did the choreography, and Johan Hye-Knudsen conducted. In the same version, the opera was then repeated in 1944, and — oddly enough — it was now considered, 150 years later, to be a national Danish manifestation against the German occupation.

Nils Schiørring — the greatest expert on Danish musical history — thought that Holger Danske must be considered "the most significant musicodramatic work that saw the light of day in the country in the 1700s."

== Sources ==
- Libretto booklet accompanying Dacapo CD release of opera, Copenhagen, 1995.
