= Jens Baggesen =

Danish poet (1764–1826)

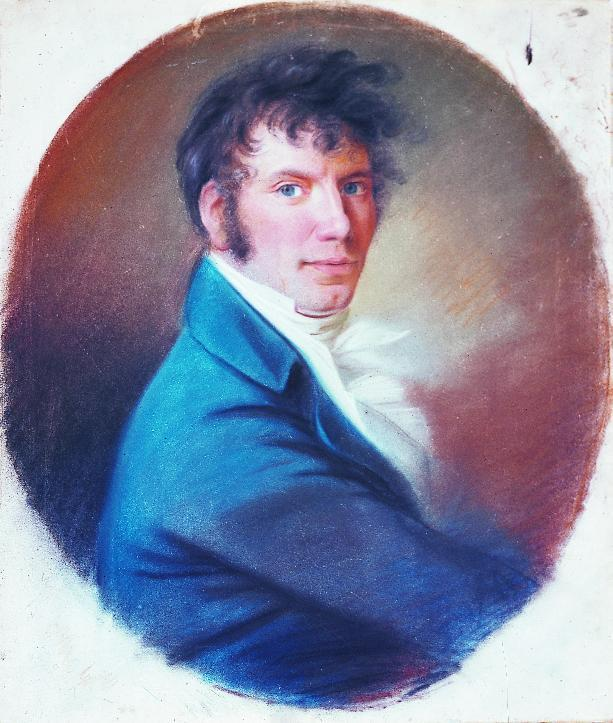
- Jens Baggesen, pastel by Christian Horneman made during a visit to Copenhagen in 1806 from Paris where Baggesen lived at the time
- Born: Jens Immanuel Baggesen; 15 February 1764; Korsør, Denmark
- Died: 3 October 1826 (aged 62); Hamburg, German Confederation
- Occupation: Poet
- Writing career
- Notable works: Labyrinten "Da Jeg Var Lille"
- Movement: Romanticism

Signature
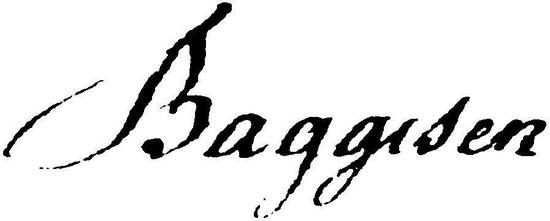

Jens Immanuel Baggesen (15 February 1764 – 3 October 1826) was a major Danish poet, librettist, critic, and comic writer.

== Life ==
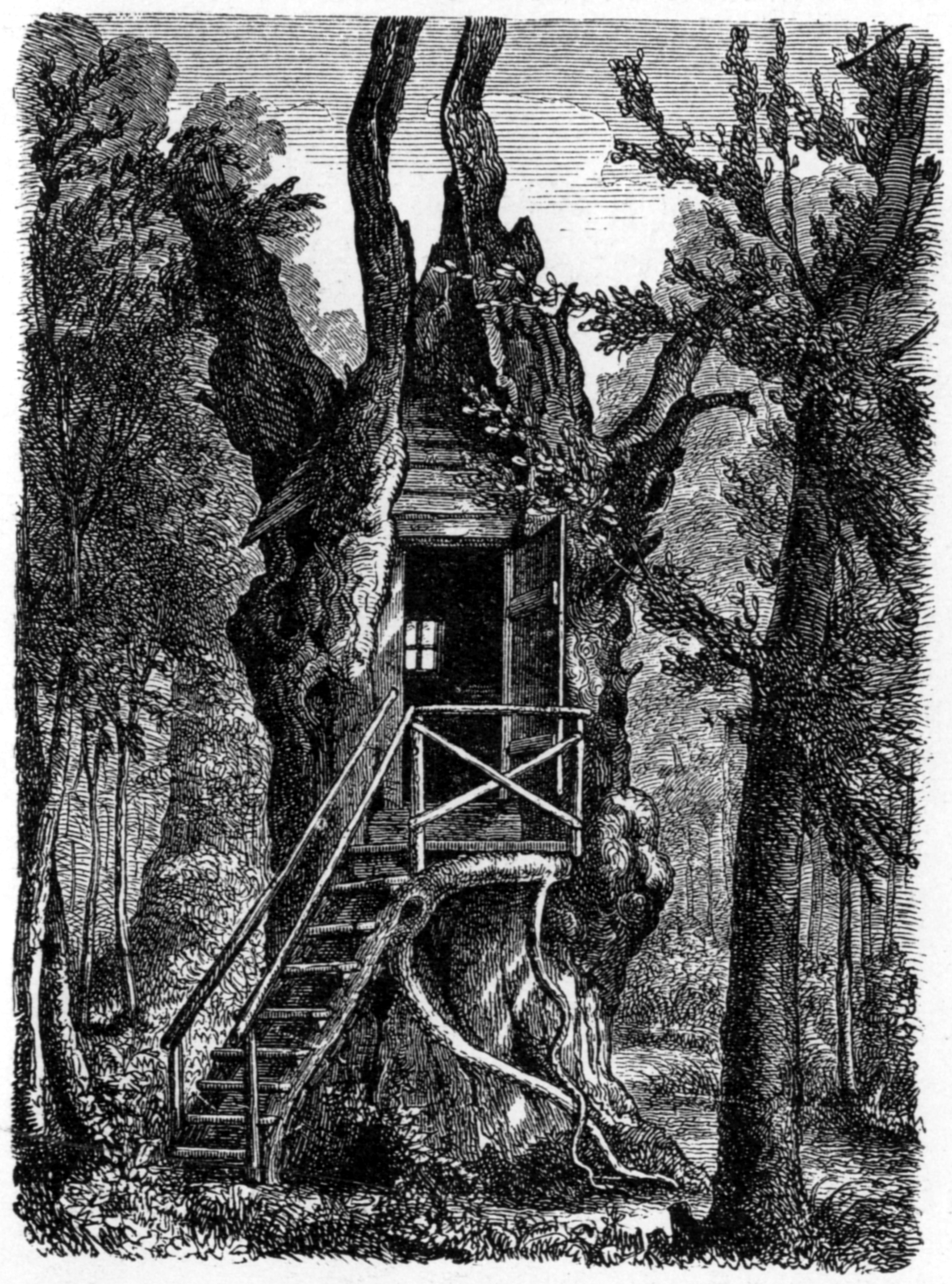
"Baggesen's Oak" (Baggesens Eg) at Christianssæde manor on Lolland in Denmark, which inspired the poet's Landforvandlingen

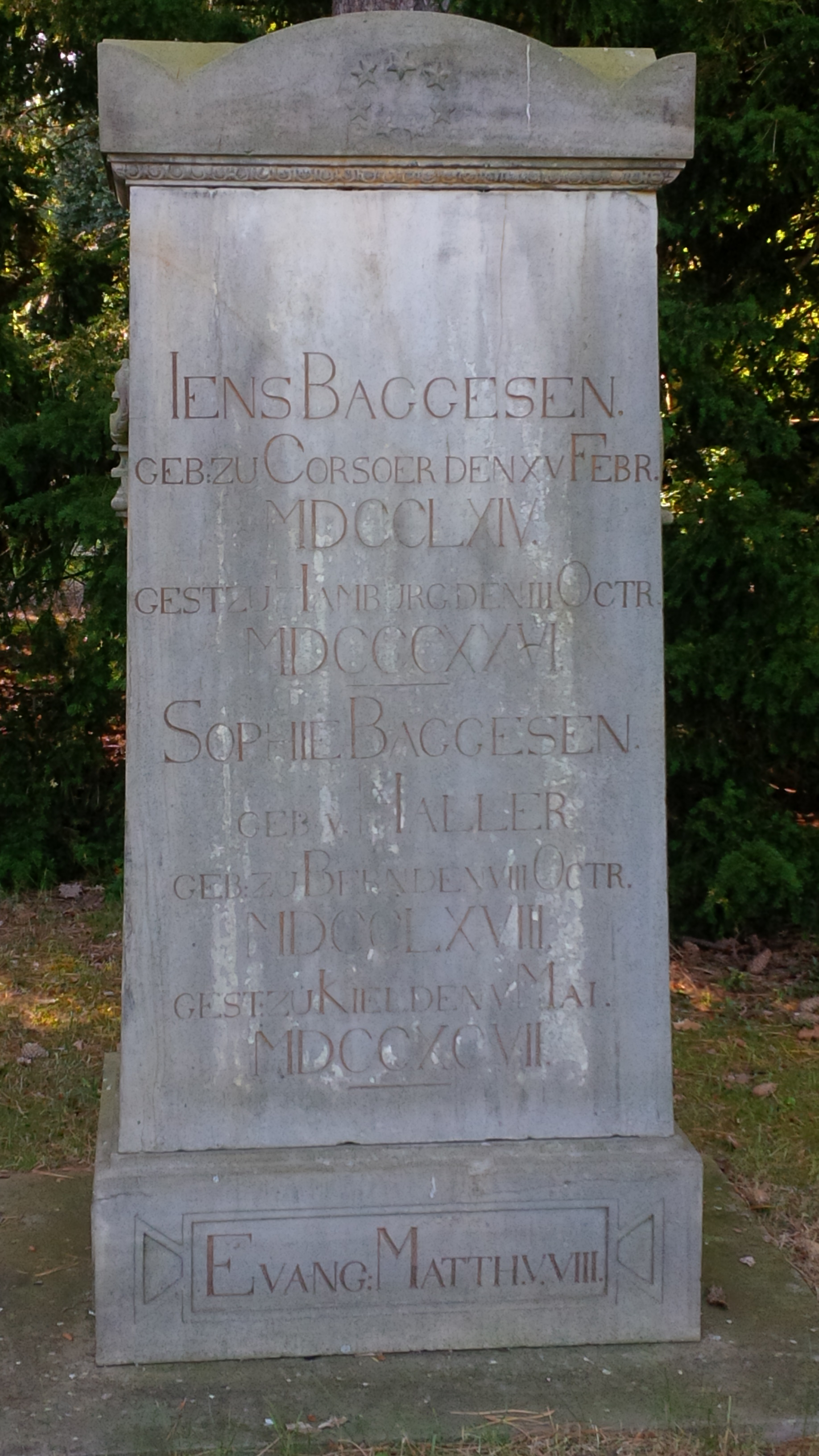
Baggesen's grave at Eichhof Cemetery in Kiel, Germany.

Baggesen was born at Korsør on the Danish island of Zealand on February 15, 1764. His parents were very poor, and he was sent to copy documents at the office of the clerk of Hornsherred District before he was twelve. He was a melancholy, feeble child, and he attempted suicide more than once. By dint of indomitable perseverance, he managed to gain an education; in 1782, he entered the University of Copenhagen.

His first work—a verse Comical Tales broadly similar to the later Broad Grins of Colman the Younger—took the capital by storm and the struggling poet found himself a popular favorite at age 21. He then tried more serious lyric poetry and his tact, elegant manners, and versatility gained him a place in the best society. In March 1789, his success collapsed when his opera Holger Danske was received with mockery of its many faults and a heated nationalist controversy over Baggesen's association with Germans. He left Denmark in a rage and spent the next years in Germany, France, and Switzerland.

In 1790, he married at Bern and began to write in German. He published his next poem Alpenlied ("Alpine Song") in that language, but brought the Danish Labyrinten ("Labyrinth") as a peace offering upon his return to Denmark in the winter. It was received with unbounded homage. Over the next twenty years, he published volumes alternately in Danish and German and wandered across northern Europe before settling principally in Paris. His most important German work during this period was the 1803 idyllic hexameter epic called Parthenais.

Upon his 1806 visit to Copenhagen, he found the young Oehlenschläger hailed as the great poet of the day and his own popularity on the wane. He then stayed, engaging in one abusive literary feud after another, most with the underlying issue that Baggesen was determined not to allow Oehlenschläger to be considered a greater poet than himself. He finally left for Paris in 1820, where he lost his second wife and youngest child in 1822. Suffering a period of imprisonment for his debts, he fell at last into a hopeless melancholy madness. Having slightly recovered, he determined to see Denmark once more, but died en route at the Freemasons' hospital in Hamburg on October 3, 1826. He was buried at Kiel.

== Legacy ==
Baggesen's many-sided talents achieved success in all forms of writing, but his political, philosophical, and critical works fell out of favor by the mid-19th century. His satire is marred by his egotism and passions, but his comic poems are deathless. His finished and elegant style was very influential on later Danish literature, in which he is regarded as the major figure between Holberg and Oehlenschläger. His greatest success, however, has proven to be the simple song Da Jeg Var Lille ("There Was a Time when I Was Very Little") which was known by heart among Danes a century after his death. It outlived all of his epics.

There is a statue of Baggesen on Havnepladsen in Korsør, unveiled on 6 May 1906 by Professor Vilhelm Andersen. The local Best Western hotel is also named after him.
