= Hucbald =

Benedictine monk and music theorist (c. 850 – 930)

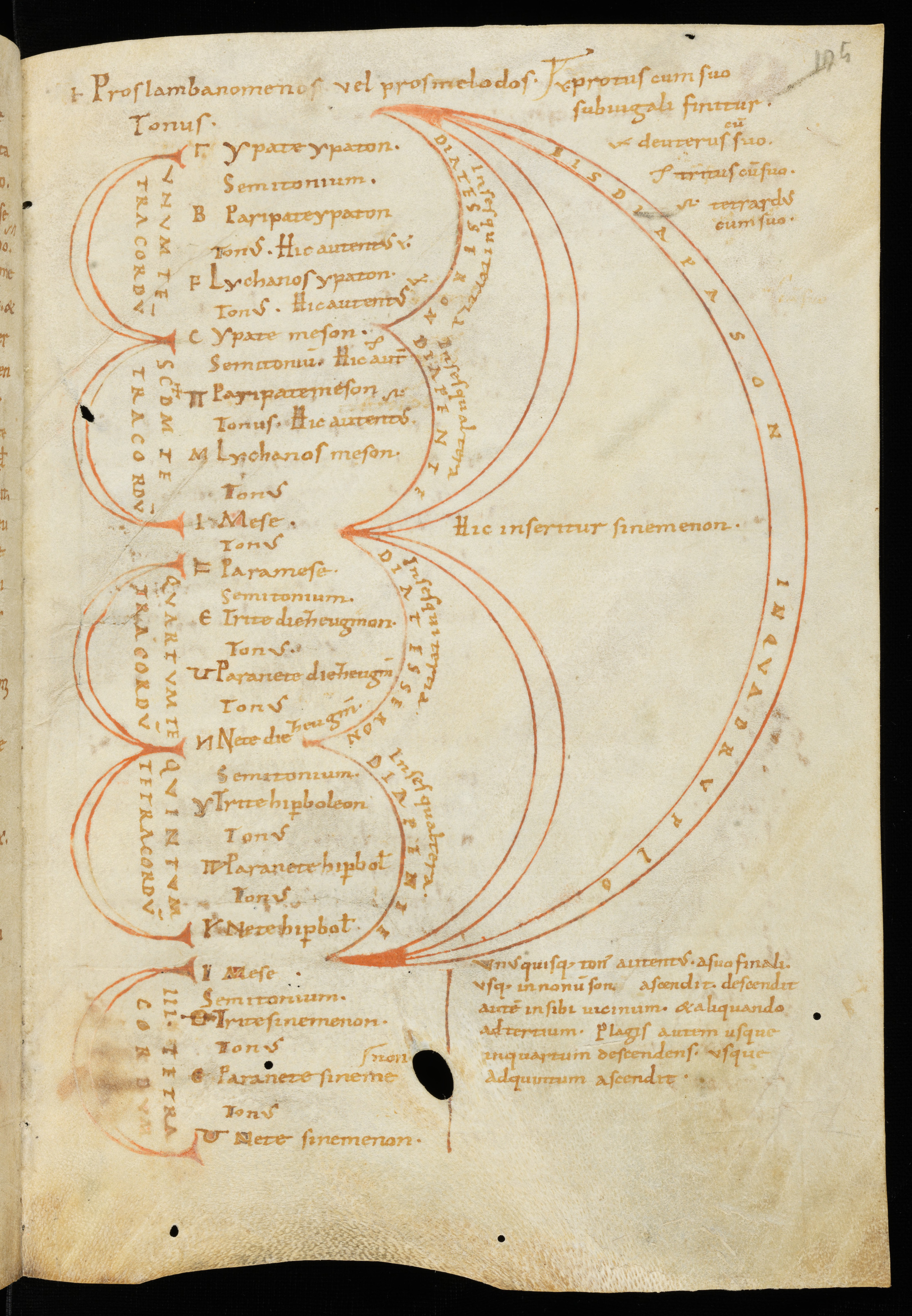
Hucbald's Musica, page 125 in the Codex 169(468) from the Abbey library of Saint Gall

Hucbald (c. 840 or 850 – 20 June 930; also Hucbaldus or Hubaldus) was a Benedictine monk active as a music theorist, poet, composer, teacher, and hagiographer. He was long associated with Saint-Amand Abbey, so is often known as Hucbald of St Amand. Deeply influenced by Boethius' De Institutione Musica, Hucbald's (De) Musica, formerly known as De harmonica institutione, aims to reconcile ancient Greek music theory and the contemporary practice of Gregorian chant with the use of many notated examples. Among the leading music theorists of the Carolingian era, he was likely a near contemporary of Aurelian of Réôme, the unknown author of the Musica enchiriadis, and the anonymous authors of other music theory texts Commemoratio brevis, Alia musica, and De modis.

== Life ==
Born in northern France, about 840 or 850, Hucbald studied at Elnone Abbey (later named Saint-Amand Abbey, after its 7th-century founder) where his uncle Milo was chief master of studies (scholasticus), in the diocese of Doornik. He made rapid progress in the sciences of the quadrivium, including that of practical music, and, according to a laudatory 11th-century biographical account, at an early age composed a hymn in honour of St Andrew, which met with such success as to excite the jealousy of his uncle. It is said that Hucbald in consequence was compelled to leave Saint-Amand and to seek protection from the bishop of Nevers.

He was also a companion of studies of such future masters as Remigius of Auxerre and Heiric of Auxerre, perhaps as a disciple of the court philosopher Johannes Scottus Eriugena. In 872 he was back again at Saint-Amand as the successor in the headmastership of the monastery school of his uncle, to whom he would have been presumably reconciled. Between 883 and 900 Hucbald went on several missions to reform and reconstruct schools of music damaged or destroyed by the Norman, including those of St. Bertin and Rheims. In 900, however, he returned to Saint-Amand, where he remained until his death on 20 June 930.

== Works ==
=== Music theory ===
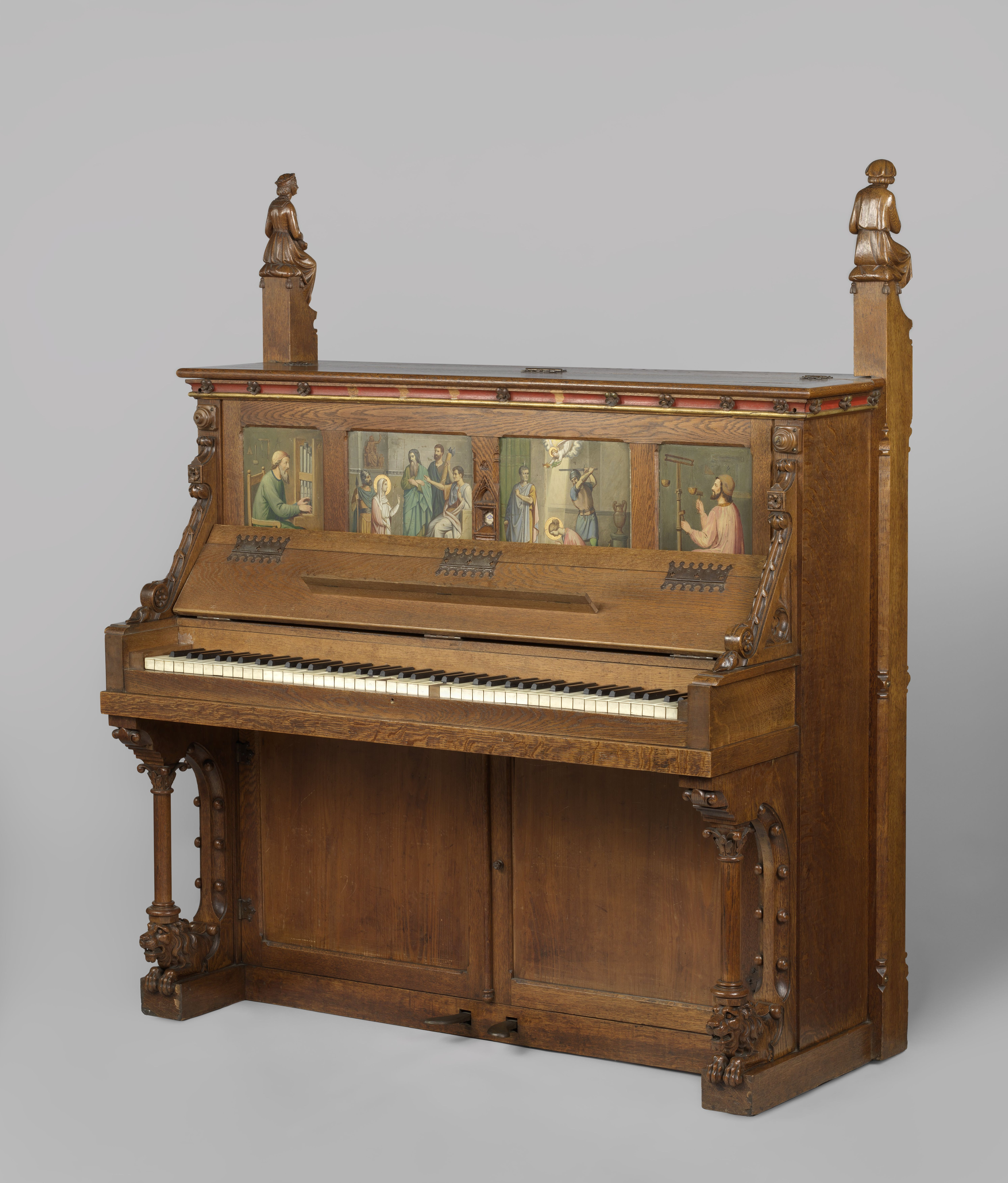
A 19th century piano depicting Hucbald (far left) among other Christian and musical figures.

The only theoretical work which can positively be ascribed to Hucbald is his Musica (formerly known as De harmonica institutione), probably written about 880. The work shows considerable influence from the writings of Boethius, and by extension Ptolemy.

The Musica enchiriadis, published with other writings of minor importance in Gerbert's Scriptores de Musica, and containing a complete system of musical science as well as instructions regarding notation, has now been proved to have originated elsewhere about the same time and to have been the work of unknown writers belonging to the same intellectual milieu. This work is celebrated chiefly for an essay on a new form of notation described today as Daseian notation and its readable transmission of the first record of Western polyphonic music.

=== Compositions ===
A few sacred compositions can be somewhat securely attributed to Hucbald, some are found in the Winchester Troper and Sarum antiphoner. Literary sources suggest that he wrote many other now lost works.

=== Other works ===
In addition to his musical works, Hucbald also wrote literary poetry intended to be read rather than sung. Two poems in classical Latin hexameters survive. One is the remarkable Ecloga de calvis, a poem of 146 lines in praise of baldness, in which every word begins with the letter C (the first letter in the word calvus, "bald"). The catalogue of illustrious bald men includes kings, generals, poets, doctors, and even the apostle Paul. Although the poem was probably written during the reign of Charles the Bald, there is no evidence to support the common assumption that it was dedicated to him, and a separate 54-line prefatory poem that precedes the work in the manuscripts explicitly dedicates it to Hatto, the archbishop of Mainz. The Ecloga de calvis circulated widely during the Renaissance: at least six printed editions are known from the first half of the 16th century, and Erasmus in one of his dialogues recommends recitation of its alliterative lines as a cure for stuttering.

The other hexameter work, De diebus Aegyptiacis, is a short astrological poem listing the days of ill omen in each month of the year. Hucbald also wrote a number of prose saint's lives.

== Sources ==
- This article incorporates text from a publication now in the public domain: Chisholm, Hugh, ed. (1911). "Hucbald". Encyclopædia Britannica. Vol. 13 (11th ed.). Cambridge University Press. p. 847.
- Chartier, Yves (2001). "Hucbald of St Amand". Grove Music Online. Oxford: Oxford University Press. doi:10.1093/gmo/9781561592630.article.13475. (subscription, Wikilibrary access, or UK public library membership required)
- Manitius, Max (1911). Geschichte der lateinischen Literatur des Mittelalters I: Von Justinian bis zur Mitte des zehnten Jahrhunderts. Munich: Beck. pp. 588–594.
- Palisca, Claude V., ed. (1978). Hucbald, Guido, and John on music: Three Medieval Treatises. Translated by Babb, Warren. Index of chants by Alejandro Enrique Planchart. New Haven and London: Yale University Press. ISBN 978-0-300-02040-3.
- Raby, F. J. E. (1934). A History of Secular Latin Poetry in the Middle Ages, vol. 1. Oxford: Clarendon Press. pp. 249–250.
- Sheerin, Daniel J. (1980). "A Carolingian Cure Recovered: Erasmus' Citation of Hucbald of St. Amand's Ecloga de Caluis". Bibliothèque d'Humanisme et Renaissance. 42 (1): 167–171. JSTOR 20676067.
- Weakland, Rembert (January 1956). "Hucbald as Musician and Theorist". The Musical Quarterly. 42 (1). Oxford University Press: 66–84. JSTOR 740475.
- Winterfeld, Paul von (1899). Poetae Latini Aevi Carolini IV.1. Berlin: Weidemann. pp. 261–275. (In the series Monumenta Germaniae Historica.)
- "Hucbald | French music theorist | Britannica". Encyclopædia Britannica. Chicago: Encyclopædia Britannica, Inc. 1 January 2021. Archived from the original on 27 August 2021.
