= Planchart =

Planchart is a surname. Notable people with the surname include:

- Alejandro Planchart (1935–2019), Venezuelan-American musicologist, conductor, and composer
- Enrique Planchart (1937–2021), Venezuelan mathematician and academic
- Manuel Planchart (born 1942), Venezuelan sprinter
