= Enchiriadis =

Enchiriadis may refer to:

- Musica enchiriadis (Music Manual), a 9th-century music theory treatise
- Scolica enchiriadis (Commentary on the Manual), an extension of the above treatise
- a Spanish record label founded by Raúl Mallavibarrena director of Musica Ficta (Spain)
