= Neume =

System of medieval musical notation

A sample of Kýrie Eléison XI (Orbis Factor) from the Liber Usualis. Listen to it interpreted.

A neume (/njuːm/; sometimes spelled neum) is the basic element of Western and some Eastern systems of musical notation prior to the invention of five-line staff notation.

The earliest neumes were inflective marks that indicated the general shape but not necessarily the exact notes or rhythms to be sung. Later developments included the use of heightened neumes that showed the relative pitches between neumes, and the creation of a four-line musical staff that identified particular pitches. Neumes do not generally indicate rhythm, but additional symbols were sometimes juxtaposed with neumes to indicate changes in articulation, duration, or tempo. Neumatic notation was later used in medieval music to indicate certain patterns of rhythm called rhythmic modes, and eventually evolved into modern musical notation. Neumatic notation remains standard in modern editions of plainchant.

== Etymology ==
The word neume entered the English language in the Middle English forms newme, nevme, neme in the 15th century, from the Middle French neume, in turn from either medieval Latin pneuma or neuma, the former either from ancient Greek πνεῦμα pneuma ('breath') or νεῦμα neuma ("sign"), or else directly from Greek as a corruption or an adaptation of the former.

== Early history ==
Although chant was probably sung since the earliest days of the church, for centuries it was transmitted only orally.

The earliest known systems involving neumes are of Aramaic origin and were used to notate inflections in the quasi-emmelic (melodic) recitation of the Christian holy scriptures. As such they resemble functionally a similar system used for the notation of recitation of the Qur'an, the holy book of Islam. This early system was called ekphonetic notation, from the Greek ἐκφώνησις ekphonesis meaning quasi-melodic recitation of text.

Around the 9th century neumes began to become shorthand mnemonic aids for the proper melodic recitation of chant. A prevalent view is that neumatic notation was first developed in the Eastern Roman Empire. This seems plausible given the well-documented peak of musical composition and cultural activity in major cities of the empire (now regions of southern Turkey, Syria, Lebanon and Israel) at that time. The corpus of extant Byzantine music in manuscript and printed form is far larger than that of the Gregorian chant, due in part to the fact that neumes fell into disuse in the west after the rise of modern staff notation and with it the new techniques of polyphonic music, while the Eastern tradition of Greek orthodox church music and the reformed neume notation remains alive today.

Slavic neume notations ("Znamenny Chant") are on the whole even more difficult to decipher and transcribe than Byzantine or Gregorian neume notations.

== Western plainchant ==
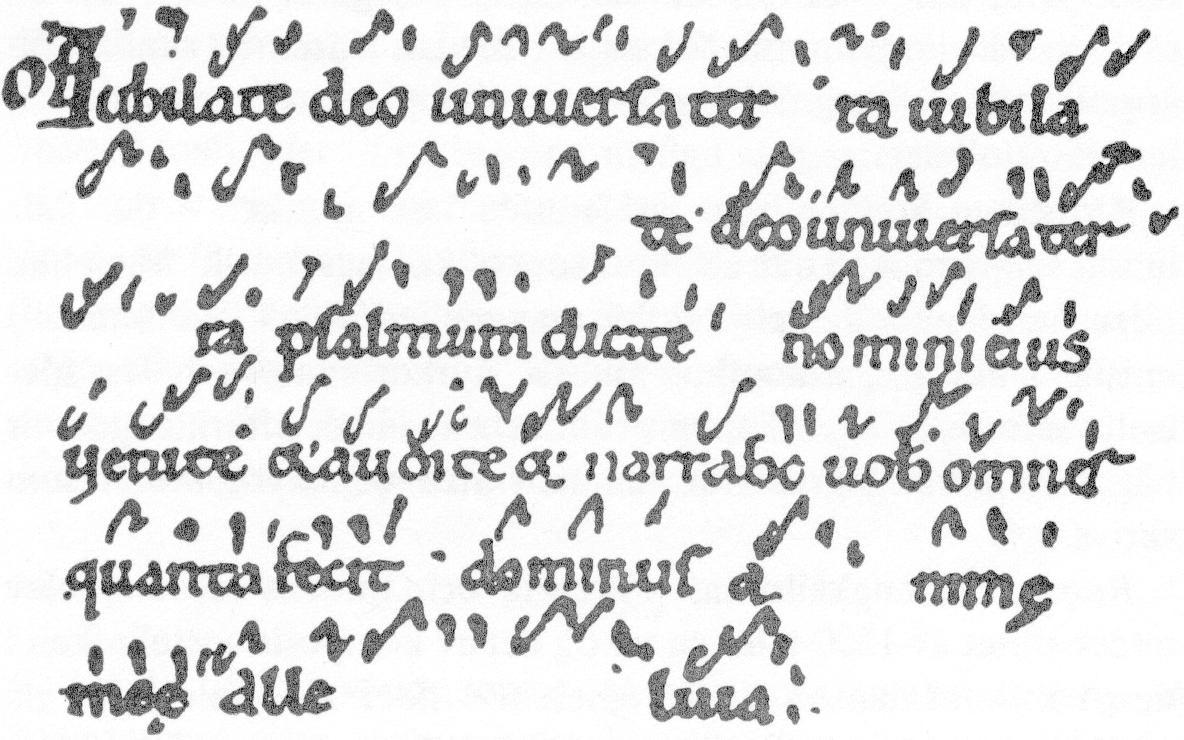
"Iubilate deo universa terra" shows psalm verses in mixed shapes between St Gall and palæo-Frankish

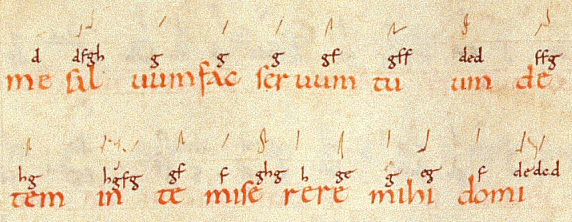
Adiastematic central French neumes combined with letter notation in a full tonary about 1000 from the Abbey Saint Benigne de Dijon

The earliest Western notation for chant appears in the 9th century. These early staffless neumes, called cheironomic or in campo aperto, appeared as freeform wavy lines above the text. Various scholars see these as deriving from cheironomic hand-gestures, from the ekphonetic notation of Byzantine chant, or from punctuation or accent marks. Each syllable of the text had a corresponding neume that indicated the note pattern to be sung. This could simply be a single note, or one of a number of melodic patterns. Cheironomic neumes indicated changes in pitch and duration within each syllable, but did not specify the pitches of individual notes, the intervals between pitches within a neume, or the relative starting pitches of different syllables' neumes. They were mnemonics, reminding singers of how the melody was sung, but do not contain enough information to reconstruct the actual music. For this reason, a significant quantity of early western plainchant, such as the Mozarabic chant of the Iberian peninsula, can only be reconstructed conjecturally because it survives only as cheironomic neumes.

There is evidence that the earliest Western musical notation, in the form of neumes in campo aperto (without staff-lines), was created at Metz around 800, as a result of Charlemagne's desire for Frankish church musicians to retain the performance nuances used by the Roman singers.

Presumably these were intended only as mnemonics for melodies learned by ear. The earliest extant manuscripts (9th–10th centuries) of such neumes include:

- Messine or Lotharingian neumes (from the monastery of Metz and Laon in northeast France)
- Protoaquitanian and Aquitanian neumes (southern France, also used in Spain)
- Saint Gall neumes in Switzerland and North of Lake Constance (Reichenau) up to the present day, medieval Germany and Austria
- Nonantolan neumes in Veneto and Emiglia Romagna
- Breton neumes in Brittany and northern France (developing versus central French notation with Gallican shapes)
- Palæo-Frankish neumes (between the 10th and 11th centuries)
- Central French neumes in Cluny, Nevers, Fleury, Chartres, Burgundy and Normandy, but also Norman Sicily, partly with square forms on staff
- Ambrosian neumes of Milan and Lake Como region (later on staff with one coloured line for alternation)

With the 11th century even adiastematic neumes were heightened, William of Volpiano's use of letter notation (here called "digraphic notation") had only an impact at those monasteries in Normandy where he was active as founding abbot, but it was not used in later Norman foundations in Italy:

- "Beneventan" heightened neumes and script (sometimes in combination with one written or scratched line), on staff since 12th century (Tuscany, Frosinone, Benevent, Rome, Apulia, Croatia and Dalmatia)
- Anglo-Saxonian heightened adiastematic neumes used in the 11th-century manuscripts of the Winchester Troper (close to central French neumes)
- Cistercian notation with staff since 12th century (Veneto, France and Central Europe)
- Square notation on red staff since 13th century (Paris and many monastic scriptoria)
- Gothic or Hufnagel notation on black staff since 13th century

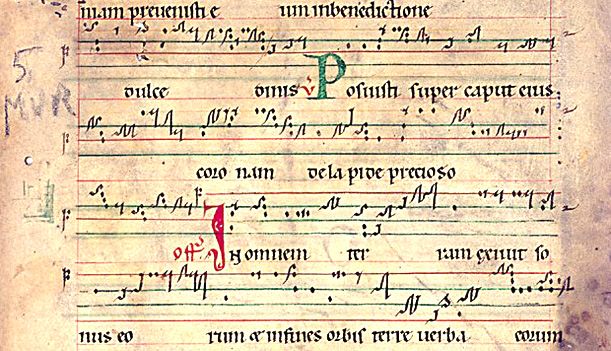
Cistercian neumes, St. Denis/St. Evrault, North France, 12th century. (Quon)iam prevenisti eum in benedictione and Offertorium. In omnem terram exivit sonus. Variation of the letter F to the left of each line.

In the early 11th century, Beneventan neumes (from the churches of Benevento in southern Italy) were written at varying distances from the text to indicate the overall shape of the melody; such neumes are called heightened or diastematic neumes, which showed the relative pitches between neumes. Despite this limitation, there have been recent advances in the interpretation of Beneventan neumes which hold out the possibility of at least tentative reconstruction of the chants. A few manuscripts from the same period use digraphic notation in which note names are included below the neumes. Shortly after this, one to four staff lines—an innovation traditionally ascribed to Guido d'Arezzo—clarified the exact relationship between pitches. One line was marked as representing a particular pitch, usually C or F. These neumes resembled the same thin, scripty style of the chironomic notation. By the 11th century, chironomic neumes had evolved into square notation. In Germany, a variant called Gothic neumes continued to be used until the 16th century. This variant is also known as Hufnagel notation, as the used neumes resemble the nails (Hufnägel in German) one uses to attach horseshoes.

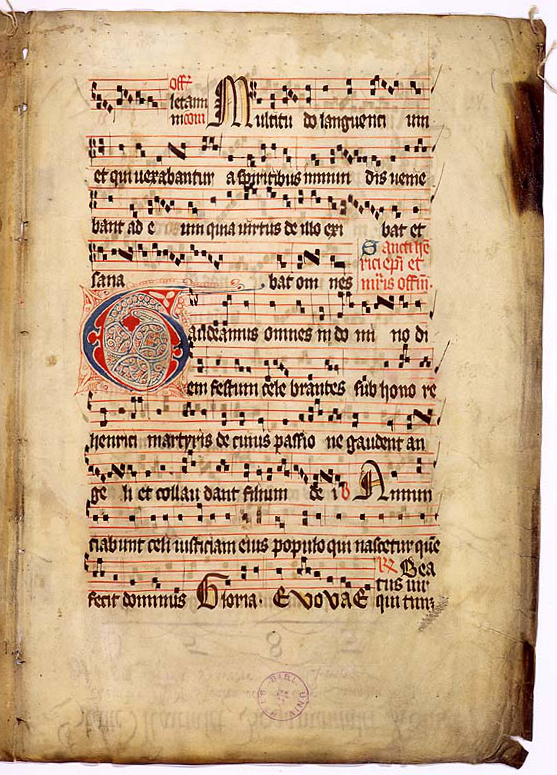
"Gaudeamus omnes", from the Graduale Aboense, was scripted using square notation.

By the 13th century, the neumes of Gregorian chant were usually written in square notation on a staff with four lines and three spaces and a clef marker, as in the 14th–15th century Graduale Aboense shown here. In square notation, small groups of ascending notes on a syllable are shown as stacked squares, read from bottom to top, while descending notes are written with diamonds read from left to right. In melismatic chants, in which a syllable may be sung to a large number of notes, a series of smaller such groups of neumes are written in succession, read from left to right. A special symbol called the custos, placed at the end of a system, showed which pitch came next at the start of the following system. Special neumes such as the oriscus, quilisma, and liquescent neumes, indicate particular vocal treatments for these notes. This system of square notation is standard in modern chantbooks.

== Solesmes notation ==
Various manuscripts and printed editions of Gregorian chant, using varying styles of square-note neumes, circulated throughout the Catholic Church for centuries. Some editions added rhythmic patterns, or meter, to the chants. In the 19th century the monks of the Benedictine abbey of Solesmes, particularly Dom Joseph Pothier (1835–1923) and Dom André Mocquereau (1849–1930), collected facsimiles of the earliest manuscripts and published them in a series of 12 publications called Paléographie musicale. They also assembled definitive versions of many of the chants, and developed a standardized form of the square-note notation that was adopted by the Catholic Church and is still in use in publications such as the Liber Usualis (although there are also published editions of this book in modern notation).

As a general rule, the notes of a single neume are sung to one syllable of the text. All three pitches of a three-note neume, for example, must all be sung on the same syllable. There may be cases where neumes are used to notate polyphonic music; Richard Crocker has argued that in the special case of the early Aquitanian polyphony of the St. Martial school, neumes must have been "broken" between syllables to facilitate the coordination of parts. However, a single syllable may be sung to so many notes that several neumes in succession are used to notate it. The single-note neumes indicate that only a single note corresponds to that syllable. Chants that primarily use single-note neumes are called syllabic; chants with typically one multi-note neume per syllable are called neumatic, and those with many neumes per syllable are called melismatic.

== Rhythmic interpretation ==
The Solesmes monks also determined performance practice for Gregorian chant based on their research. Because of the ambiguity of medieval musical notation, the question of rhythm in Gregorian chant is contested by scholars. Some neumes, such as the pressus, do indicate the lengthening of notes. Common modern practice, following the Solesmes interpretation, is to perform Gregorian chant with no beat or regular metric accent, in which time is free, allowing the text to determine the accent and the melodic contour to determine phrasing. By the 13th century, with the widespread use of square notation, it is believed that most chant was sung with each note getting approximately an equal value, although Jerome of Moravia cites exceptions in which certain notes, such as the final notes of a chant, are lengthened.

The Solesmes school, represented by Dom Pothier and Dom Mocquereau, supports a rhythm of equal values per note, allowing for lengthening and shortening of note values for musical purposes. A second school of thought, including Wagner, Jammers, and Lipphardt, supports different rhythmic realizations of chant by imposing musical meter on the chant in various ways. Musicologist Gustave Reese said that the second group, called mensuralists, "have an impressive amount of historical evidence on their side" (Music in the Middle Ages, p. 146), but the equal-note Solesmes interpretation has permeated the musical world, apparently due to its ease of learning and resonance with modern musical taste.

== Illustrations ==
Examples of neumes may be seen here: "Basic & Liquescent Aquitanian Neumes" (archive from 10 June 2006, accessed 12 September 2014), , .

=== Clefs ===
Neumes are written on a four-line staff on the lines and spaces, unlike modern music notation, which uses five lines. Chant does not rely on any absolute pitch or key; the clefs are only to establish the half and whole steps of the hexachord: "ut", "re", "mi", "fa", "sol", "la". The clef bracketing a line indicates the location "ut" in the case of the C clef, or "fa" in the case of the F clef as shown:

C clef
F clef

=== Single notes ===
Punctum ("point")
Virga ("rod")
Bipunctum ("two points")

The virga and punctum are of identical length. The virga is used to indicate a note within a group on which the main stress – the ictus – falls. Scholars disagree on whether the bipunctum indicates a note twice as long, or whether the same note should be re-articulated. When this latter interpretation is favoured, it may be called a repercussive neume.

=== Two notes ===
Clivis ("by slope")	Two notes descending
Podatus or Pes ("foot")	Two notes ascending

When two notes are one above the other, as in the podatus, the lower note is always sung first.

=== Three notes ===
Scandicus ("climbing")	Three notes ascending
Climacus ("climactic")	Three notes descending
Torculus ("twisted")	low-high-low (up-down)
Porrectus ("raised")	high-low-high (down-up)

The fact that the first two notes of the porrectus are connected as a diagonal rather than as individual notes seems to be a scribe's shortcut.

=== Compound neumes ===
Several consecutive neumes can be grouped together for a single syllable, and some of these combinations have specific names. These are two examples:

Praepunctis	a note appended to the beginning is praepunctis; this example is a podatus pressus because it involves a repeated note
Subpunctis	One or more notes appended at the end of a neume; this example is a scandicus subbipunctis

=== Other basic markings ===
Flat	Same meaning as modern flat; only occurs on B, and is placed before the entire neume, or group of neumes, rather than immediately before the affected note. Its effect typically lasts the length of a word and is reinserted if needed on the next word.
Custos	This mark occurs at the end of a staff. It indicates what the first note of the next staff will be, as an aid to singers.
Mora	Like a dot in modern notation, lengthens the preceding note, typically doubling it

=== Interpretive marks ===
The interpretation of these markings is the subject of great dispute among scholars.

Vertical episema (vertical stroke)	Indicates a subsidiary accent when there are five or more notes in a neume group. This marking was an invention of the Solesmes interpreters, rather than a marking from the original manuscripts.
Horizontal episema (horizontal stroke)	Used over a single note or a group of notes (as shown), essentially ignored in the Solesmes interpretation; other scholars treat it as indicating a lengthening or stress on the note(s).
Liquescent neume (small note)	Can occur on almost any type of neume pointing up or down; usually associated with certain letter combinations such as double consonants, consonant pairs, or diphthongs in the text. For example, in the Agnus Dei of the plainchant Missa XI (Missa Orbis factor), the first syllables of the words tollis and mundi are notated using liquescent neumes. So the second note of the neume would be used to sing the second 'l' of tollis and the 'n' of mundi.
Quilisma (squiggly note)	Always as part of a multi-note neume, usually a scandicus, this sign is a matter of great dispute; the Solesmes interpretation is that the preceding note is to be lengthened slightly.

Other interpretations of the quilisma:

- Shake or trill—William Mahrt of Stanford University supports this interpretation. This interpretation is also put into practice by the Washington Cappella Antiqua, under the direction of Patrick Jacobson.
- Quarter-tone or accidental. The support for this interpretation lies in some early digraphic manuscripts that combine chironomic neumes with letter-names. In places where other manuscripts have quilismas these digraphs often have a strange symbol in place of a letter, suggesting to some scholars the use of a pitch outside the solmization system represented by the letter names.

There are other uncommon neume shapes thought to indicate special types of vocal performance, though their precise meaning is a matter of debate:

- The trigon. The orthodox Solesme interpretation of this obscure three-note neume is a unison plus a third below, but there are other possibilities. It appears to have originated at St. Gall, though it is also widespread in French chant sources from the 10th and 11th centuries. It has been proposed that it may have a microtonal meaning, but there is "an admitted lack of conclusiveness in the arguments in favor of notes smaller than a semitone."
- The distropha and tristropha are groups of two and three apostrophes, usually of the same pitch. They probably differed from normal repeated notes (virgae or puncta) in the way they were sung. Although there is some doubt on the matter, most modern writers accept Aurelian of Réôme's description of a staccato reiteration.
- The oriscus is a single-note neume, usually found added as an auxiliary note to another neume. The name may derive from either the Greek horos (limit) or ōriskos (little hill). Its intended manner of performance is not clear. Although a microtonal interpretation has been suggested, there is possible contradicting evidence in the Dijon tonary, Montpellier H. 159.
- The pressus is a compound neume, usually involving an initial neume followed by an oriscus and a punctum. The initial neume may be a virga (in which case the virga + oriscus may be together called a virga strata), in which case the pressus indicates three notes; if the initial neume is a pes, then the compound indicates a four-note group. Just as with the oriscus itself, the interpretation is unsure. When chant came to be notated on a staff, the oriscus was normally represented as having the same pitch as the immediately preceding note.

There are also litterae significativae in many manuscripts, usually interpreted to indicate variations in tempo, e.g. c = celeriter (fast), t = tenete (hold) (an early form of the tenuto), a = auge (lengthen, as in a tie). The Solesmes editions omit all such letters.

== Other functions ==
Neumes were used for notating other kinds of melody than plainchant, including troubadour and trouvère melodies, monophonic versus and conductus, and the individual lines of polyphonic songs. In some traditions, such as the Notre Dame school of polyphony, certain patterns of neumes were used to represent particular rhythmic patterns called rhythmic modes.

== Other types ==
- Ekphonetic neumes annotating the melodic recitation of (Christian) holy scriptures.
- Neumes of Byzantine music – in several stages, old Byzantine, middle Byzantine, late Byzantine and post-Byzantine, and neo-Byzantine (reformed).
- Neumes of Slavic chant (Slavic neumes or "Znamenny Chant").
- Mozarabic or Hispanic neumes (Spain), also called Visigothic script. These neumes have not been deciphered, but the Mozarabic liturgy varies somewhat from the Roman rite.
- Catalan notation.
- Daseian notation – an early form of Western music notation used in 9th and 10th-century music theory treatises.
- Buddhist chant uses a type of neume.

== Digital notation ==
Because notation software usually focuses on modern European music notation, software that allows the user to use neumes is rare.

- Gregorio is a software especially written for that purpose. With its own GABC-Syntax and together with LuaTeX it provides high quality output of square notation neumes and also St. Gall neumes.
- Finale can be enhanced with Medieval 2, a third-party package devoted to early music and especially neumes.
- Lilypond is able to produce output using neumes.
- Some open fonts for neumes are available, which can be used by common office software or scorewriters.

== See also ==
- Mensural notation
- Musical notation
- Znamenny Chant
