= Daseian notation =

9th-century form of music notation

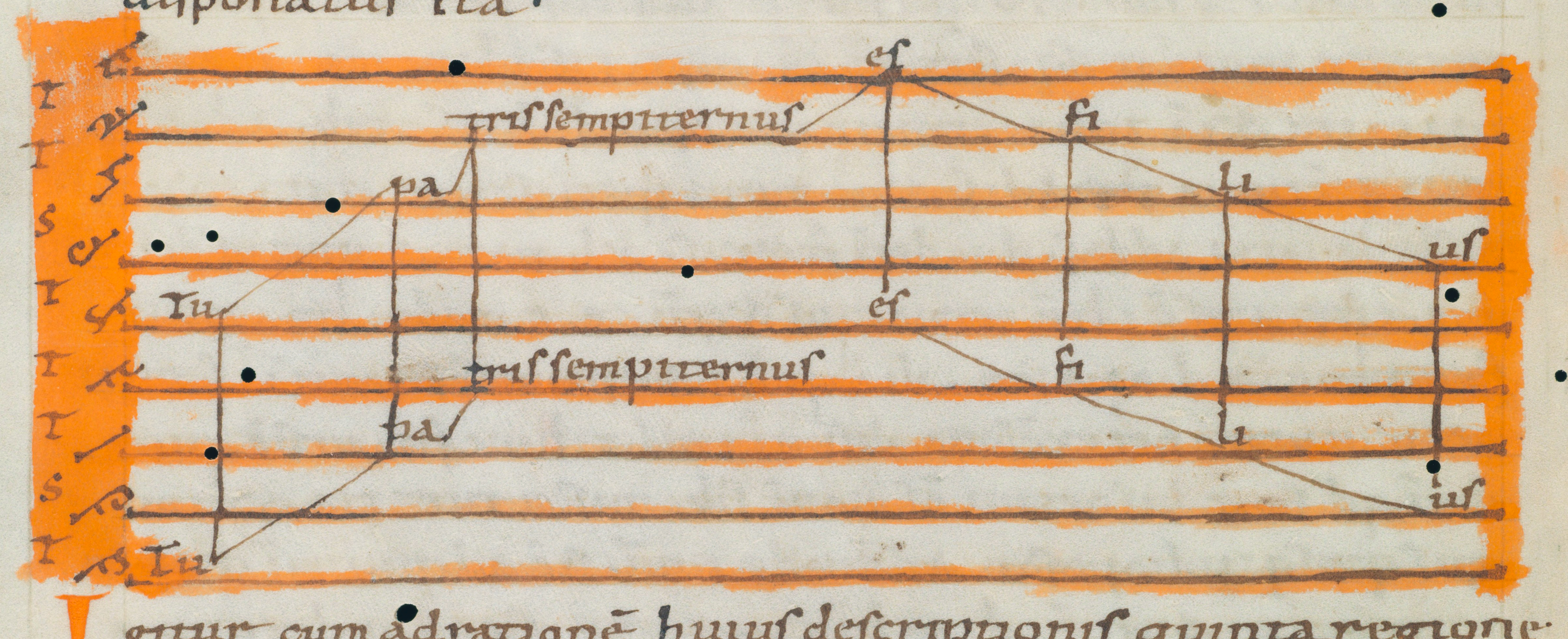
Tu patris sempiternus es filius from Te Deum written in Daseian notation. The Daseian signs are at the far left of the staff.

Daseian notation (or dasian notation) is the type of musical notation used in the ninth century anonymous musical treatises Musica enchiriadis and Scolica enchiriadis. The music of the Musica enchiriadis and Scolica enchiriadis, written in Daseian notation, are the earliest known examples of written polyphonic music in history.

== Usage ==
Musicologist Willi Apel has called the notation "a mediaeval imitation of the ancient Greek notation". The treatises themselves refer to it as "dasia"; the word derives from the Greek daseia, which refers to "rough breathing" at the start of a word in spoken prosody.

Daseian notation makes use of a staff of varying numbers of lines, from four to as many as eighteen, as well as a system of four shapes which are rotated in various ways to represent the full gamut of eighteen pitches used in the treatises. These eighteen pitches are based on a system of four repeating tetrachords, resulting in the following scale: G A B♭ c | d e f g | a b c' d' | e' f♯' g' a' | b' c♯''. This scale does not correspond to any known performance practice. When it is used to construct polyphonic music, as directed in the treatises, it results in a number of written tritones, which were considered undesirable by theorists in performance and were probably mistakes of the author or else implied the system was transposable to C D E♭ F | G A B♭ c | d e f g | a b c' d' | e' f♯' or d e f g | a b c' d' | e' f♯' g' a' | b' c♯'' d” e” | f♯'' g♯'' when necessary.

The notational signs were then placed at the far left of the staff (similar in placement to modern clef), and some illustrations are supplemented with "T" and "S" in between the signs so as to clarify the placement of semitones. Syllables of the spoken words were then written on the staff lines (see example above). If the pitch changed, the word syllables would be raised or lowered to a different staff line. This was used to notate organum in two, three and four-voice styles.

In addition to the Enchiriadis treatises, this notation is also used in the Commemoratio brevis de tonis et psalmis modulandis treatise and De organo (dictis autem, prout potuimus). However, despite the wide circulation of the Enchiriadis treatises, this notation was not widely used in practical sources. Music manuscripts of the ninth and tenth centuries record almost exclusively monophonic music, and even the extant sources of polyphonic music, such as the Winchester Troper, are written in unheightened neumes. This would continue until the development of the widely used staff system of Guido of Arezzo in the eleventh century.

Philipp Spitta was the first modern musicologist to correctly interpret this notation, in an 1889 publication.

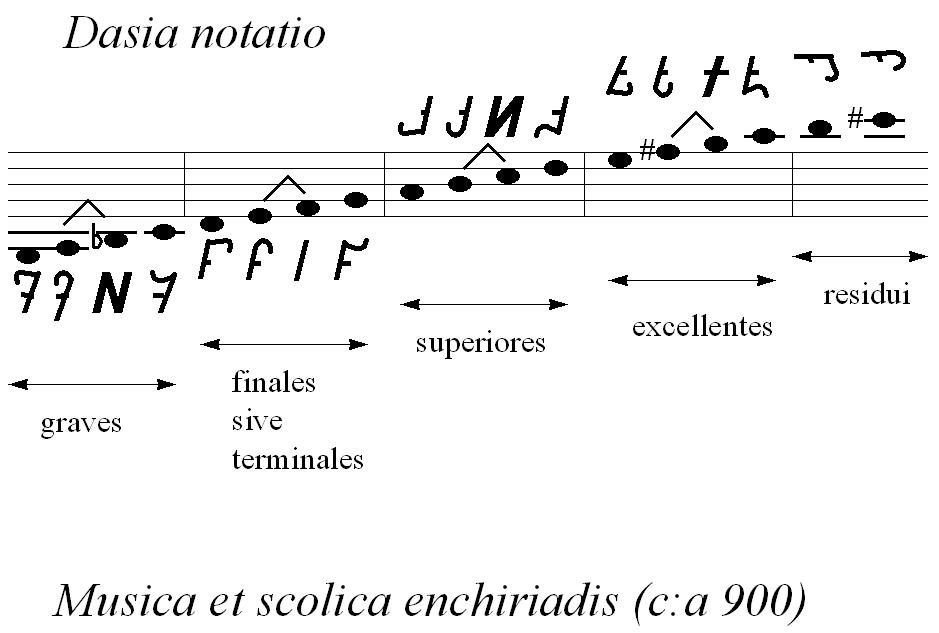
Daseian notation and its modern equivalents.

== See also ==
- Musica enchiriadis
- Scolica enchiriadis
- Tonary
