= Hoger (abbot) =

Hoger (Latin: Hogerus; died 906) was the abbot of Werden and Saint Ludger in Helmstedt from 898 until 902.

From Duke Otto I of Saxony, he acquired the field in the Herzfeld where the body of Saint Ida was buried.

He has also been tentatively assigned the authorship of the Musica enchiriadis, the first musical treatise on polyphony in the Western tradition.

== Bibliography ==
- Engel, Heinrich. Ruhrchristen. Geschichte und Geschichten von Ludgerus und den Liudgeriden, von Reichsäbten und Pfarrern in Werden an der Ruhr. Essen: Schmitz, 1997. ISBN 3-932443-04-7.
- Torkewitz, Dieter. "Zur Entstehung der Musica und Scolica Enchiriadis", Acta Musicologica, 69, 2 (1997): 156–81.
- Torkewitz, Dieter. Das älteste Dokument zur Entstehung der abendländischen Mehrstimmigkeit. Eine Handschrift aus Werden an der Ruhr. Das „Düsseldorfer Fragment“ (Archiv für Musikwissenschaft, Beiheft 44). Stuttgart: Steiner, 1999. ISBN 3-515-07407-4.
