= Ganga (music) =

Type of singing

Ganga (Cyrillic: Ганга) is a type of singing that originated from rural Dinaric mountain region. It is most commonly found in the regions of Herzegovina and Dalmatia, but it can also be found to an extent in western Bosnia, Lika, Kordun and rural areas of north-west Montenegro. It is characterized by a lone singer singing a single line of lyrics, followed by others joining in, using a vocal style that is best described as a wail.

Ganga has historically been closely associated with the region of Herzegovina, where it has developed as a strong sense of cultural identity. To ensure its survival, both Bosnia and Herzegovina and Croatia have taken measures to protect ganga as part of their cultural heritage and encourage its performance.

== Description ==
Ganga is an expressive form of singing. Although both men and women regularly perform ganga, it is extremely unusual for them to perform together, although it was not unusual for Catholic and Muslim men to perform together. Ganga is culture is mainly situated in small towns and villages.

Ganga is a dissonant form of singing, using two clashing notes to project sound over long distances. For example, if one person is singing a C note, a second person sings either a half-step above or below (B or C♯). Ganga is traditionally sung by sheepherders across stretches of valleys, for long-distance communication with each other.

== History ==
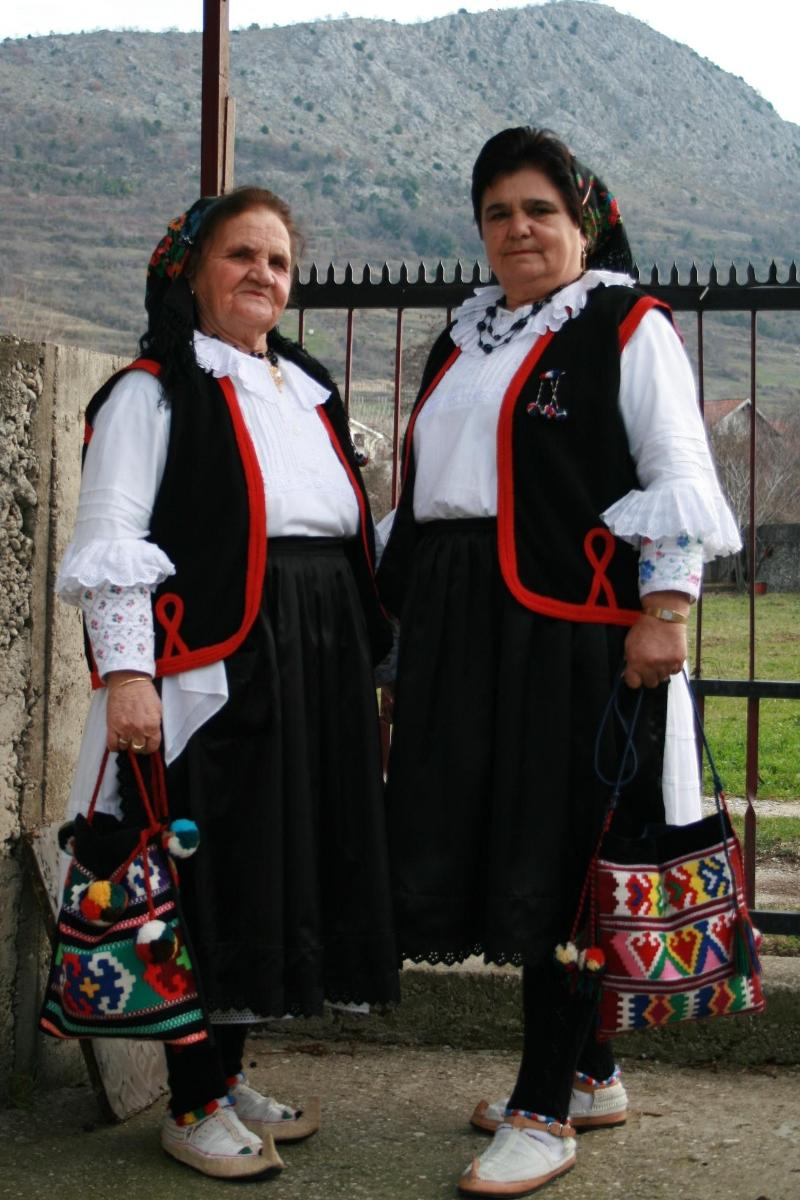
Female ganga performers from the Ljubuški, Bosnia and Herzegovina-based cultural group "Radišići"

Ganga is a remnant of the archaic polyphonic singing style that can be found throughout the Dinaric region. Over time, local populations developed their own variety of the old-style singing, such as the throat-shaking style of singing ojkanje from Dalmatia, the izvika cry from western Serbia, or the iso-polyphony of Albania and North Macedonia. In the early 20th century, priest and musicologist Branko Marić theorized that the term "ganga" derived from the Albanian word kënga which means "song", a possible remnant from the ancient Illyrians. However, others have dismissed the theory and suggested it's derived from the sounds emitting from the performers' voice (gn-gn or gan-gan).

Ganga performers historically sang about things pertaining to them, from the hardships of peasant work to the joys one finds in life. Because of its roots in the rural mountains, ganga has often been viewed by larger society as an oldfashioned or primitive tradition. More recent renditions of ganga have begun to address political issues, frequently adopting overtly nationalistic overtones and incorporating themes from wars and conflict. Several popular Croatian musicians have incorporated some Ganga into their work, such as folk singer Mate Bulić and pop stars Nina Badrić and Severina, the latter with her Eurovision song entry.

Since 2009, ganga has been protected by the Croatian Ministry of Culture to preserve and encourage its study. In 2014, Croatia and Bosnia and Herzegovina partnered to start a joint project in the development of their common cultural heritage based on Bećarac and Ganga" – the forms of folk songs protected as intangible cultural heritage. It is part of a larger cross-border cooperation program funded by the European Union for restoration and preservation of cultural and historical heritage. In 2019, the town of Tomislavgrad in Bosnia and Herzegovina named a square after ganga in recognition of its role as part of the town's cultural heritage.

== See also ==
- Music of Bosnia and Herzegovina
