= Werden Abbey =

Abbey in Essen-Werden, Germany

Coordinates: 51°23′17″N 7°00′17″E

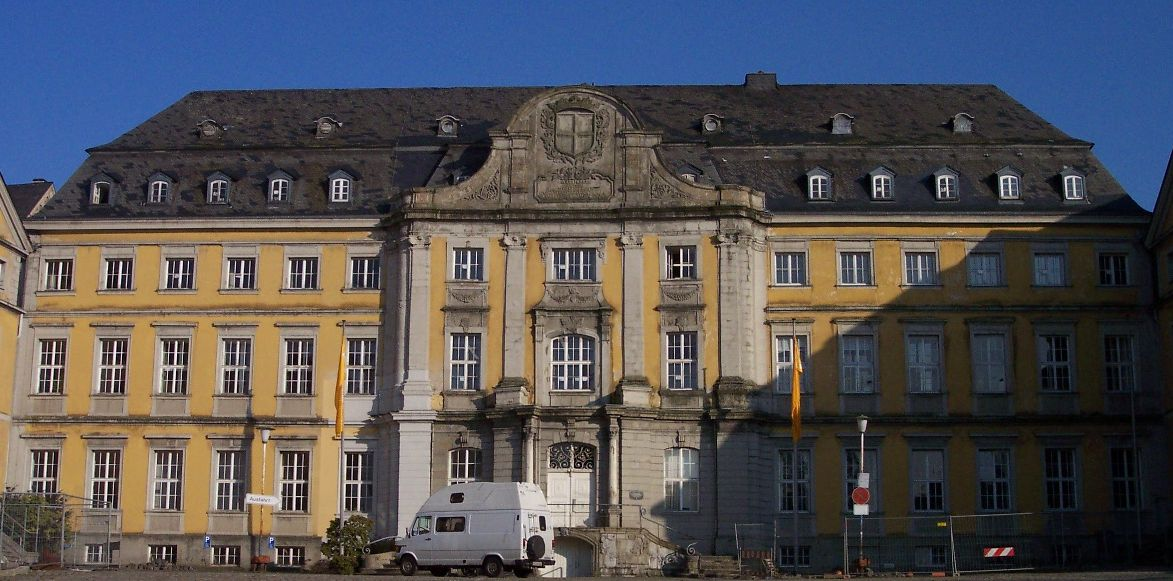
- Main building of the former abbey
- Interactive map of Werden Abbey

Monastery information
- Order: Benedictine
- Established: 799

People
- Founder: Saint Ludger

Site
- Location: Essen-Werden, Germany

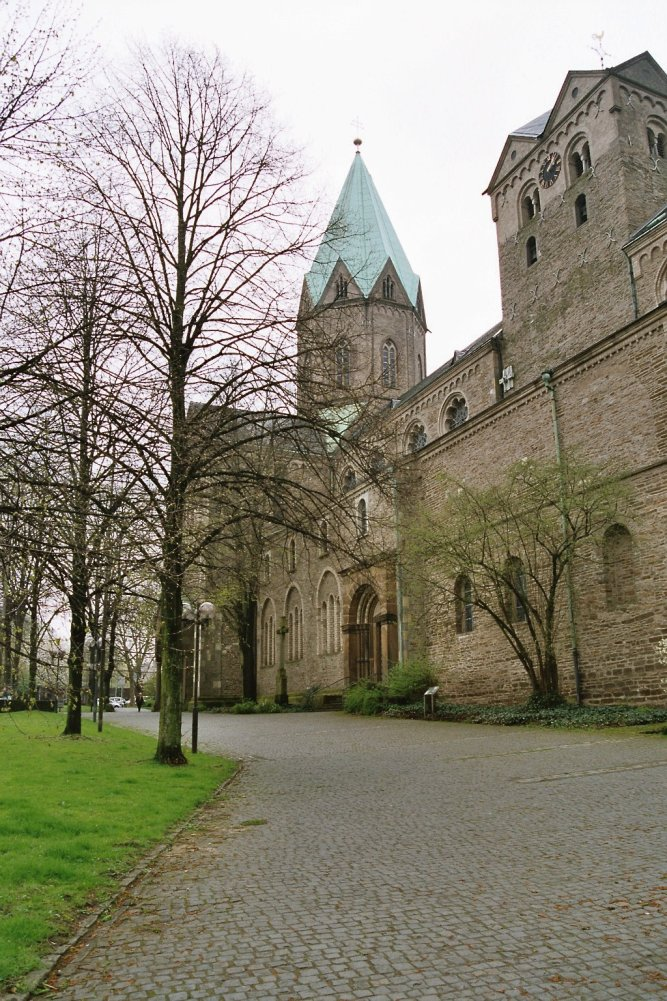
St Ludger's basilica in Werden

Werden Abbey (German: Kloster Werden) was a Benedictine monastery in Essen-Werden (Germany), situated on the Ruhr.

== Foundation of the abbey ==
Near Essen Saint Ludger founded a monastery in 799 and became its first abbot. The little church which Saint Ludger built here in honor of Saint Stephen was completed in 804 and dedicated by Saint Ludger himself, who had meanwhile become Bishop of Münster. Upon the death of Ludger on 26 March 809, the abbacy of Werden passed by inheritance first to his younger brother Hildigrim I (809–827), then successively to four of his nephews: Gerfried (827–839), Thiadgrim (ruled less than a year), Altfried (839–848), Hildigrim II (849–887). Under Hildigrim I, also Bishop of Châlons-sur-Marne, the new monastery of Helmstedt in the Diocese of Halberstadt was founded from Werden. It was ruled over by a provost, and remained a dependency of Werden till its secularization in 1803.

Werden was a wealthy abbey with possessions in Westphalia, Frisia, eastern Saxony and around the abbey itself, where it had a territory of 125 km^{2}.

On 22 May 877, under Hildigrim II, the monastery, which up to that time had been the property of the family of Saint Ludger, obtained Imperial immediacy, which amounted to the right of free abbatical election and immunity. Henceforth the abbots of Werden were imperial princes and had a seat in the Imperial Diet. The abbey church of Werden, destroyed by fire in 1256, was rebuilt in the late-Romanesque style (1256–75). Two of the most obscure yet intriguing men to hold seats of authority in Werden Abbey (found in the Archives in North Rhine-Westphalia), were Abt Johann I., (1330–44) and Abt Johann II. von Arscheid (Arscheyt, Arschott-Brabant), (1344–60). Thereafter the monastery began to decline to such an extent that under Abbot Conrad von Gleichen (1454–74), who was a married layman, the whole community consisted of only three men, who divided the possessions of the abbey among themselves. After a complete reform, instituted in 1477, by Abbot Adam von Eschweiler of the Bursfelde Congregation, Werden continued in existence until its secularization in 1803.

== Early modern times ==
Problems arose after the Reformation, when the Vögte (lords protectors) of the abbey were the Protestant rulers of Brandenburg, who had inherited the neighbouring County of the Mark.

The construction of Baroque abbey buildings, textile production and coal mining formed the economic basis of the territory of Werden in the 18th century.

== End of the abbey ==
During the secularization in 1803 the abbey and its territory became part of Prussia, but three years later it was incorporated into the Grand Duchy of Berg. In 1815 it became Prussian again, as part of the Rhine Province.

The buildings are now used by the Folkwang Hochschule.

== List of superiors and abbots ==
Name	Years of office	Date of death	Notes
Ludgerid superiors
Liudger	ca 800–809	26 March 809
Hildegrim I	809–827	19 June 827
Gerfried	827–839	12 September 839
Thiatgrim	839–840	8 February 840
Altfried	840–849	22 April 849
Hildegrim II	855/64–886	21 December 886
Elected abbots
Andulph	887–ca 888	12 March 888
Hembil	888–891?
Adaldag	892?	8 July 892
Odo	bis 898
Hoger	898–902
Hildebrand	902–910
Adalbrand	910–916	2 March 916
Wéris	916–930	5 November 930
Wigger	930–940	14 August 940
Wigo	ca 940–945	20 March 945
Reinher	945–962	1 February 962
Engelbert	962–971	9 August 971
Folkmar	971–974
Liudolf	974–983
Werinbert I.	983–1001	8 October 1001
Ratbald von Volmarstein	1001–1015	9 April 1015
Heithanrich von Altenburg	1015–1030	11 November 1030
Bardo	1030–1031	10./11 June 1051
Gerold	1031–1050
Gero	1050–1063
Gilbert	1063–1066
Adalwig	1066–1080	27 October 1081
Otto I von Sappenheim	1080–1104
Adolf von der Mark	1104–1105
Rudolf von Helpenstein	1105–1112
Liudbert von Isenberg	1112–1119	8 October 1119
Berengoz von Westerburg	1119–1125	23 September 1125
Bernhard von Wevelinghoven	1125–1140	22 September 1140
Werinbert II von Schönburg	1140–1144	11 October 1144
Volmar von Bilstein	1144–1145	7 September 1145
Lambert von Gennep	1145–1151
Wilhelm I von Moers	1151–1160	23 April 1160
Adolf I	1160–1173	21 December 1173	vermutlich aus dem gräflichen Haus Altena
Wolfram von Kirchburg	1173–1183	9 July 1183
Heribert I von Berg	1183–1197	16 July 1197
Heribert II von Büren	1197–1226	23 July 1226
Gerhard von Grafschaft	1226–1249	12 November 1249
Albert von Goer	1251–1257	13 September 1257
Albero von Tecklenburg	1257–1277	16 June 1277
Otto II von Warburg	1278–1288	5 July 1288
Heinrich I von Wildenburg	1288–1310
Wilhelm II von Hardenberg	1310–1330	18 May 1330
Johann I von Hernen	1330–1343	15 December 1343
Johann II von Arscheid	1343–1360	3 October 1360
Heinrich II von Wildenburg	1360–1382	12 September 1382
Johann III von Spiegelberg	1382–1387	20 December 1387
Bruno von Rennenberg	1387–1398
Adolf III von Spiegelberg	1398–1438	11 January 1438
Johann IV Stecke	1438–1452	2 September 1454
Konrad von Gleichen	1452–1474
Adam von Eschweiler	1474–1476		Administrator
Theodor Hagedorn	1476–1484	30 August 1484
Antonius Grimholt	1484–1517	13 June 1517
Johannes von Groningen	1517–1540	8 July 1540
Hermann von Holten	1540–1572	20 October 1572
Heinrich Duden	1573–1601	5 April 1601
Konrad Kloedt	1601–1614	6 June 1614
Hugo Preutaeus	1614–1646	24 June 1646
Heinrich Dücker	1646–1667	19 June 1667
Adolf Borcken	1667–1670	4 August 1670
Ferdinand von Erwitte	1670–1705	17 April 1706
Coelestin von Geismar	1706–1718	early 1718	1714–1718 Präsident der Bursfelder Kongregation
Theodor Thier	1719–1727	4 November 1727
Simon von Bischopinck zu Telgte	1727	1727
Benedikt von Geismar	1727–1757	29 August 1757
Anselm Sonius	1757–1774	28 October 1774
Johannes Hellersberg	1774–1780	26 March 1780
Bernhard Bierbaum	1780–1798	6 March 1798
Beda Savels	1798–1802	12 August 1828
