= Scolica enchiriadis =

Anonymous 9th-century treatise on music

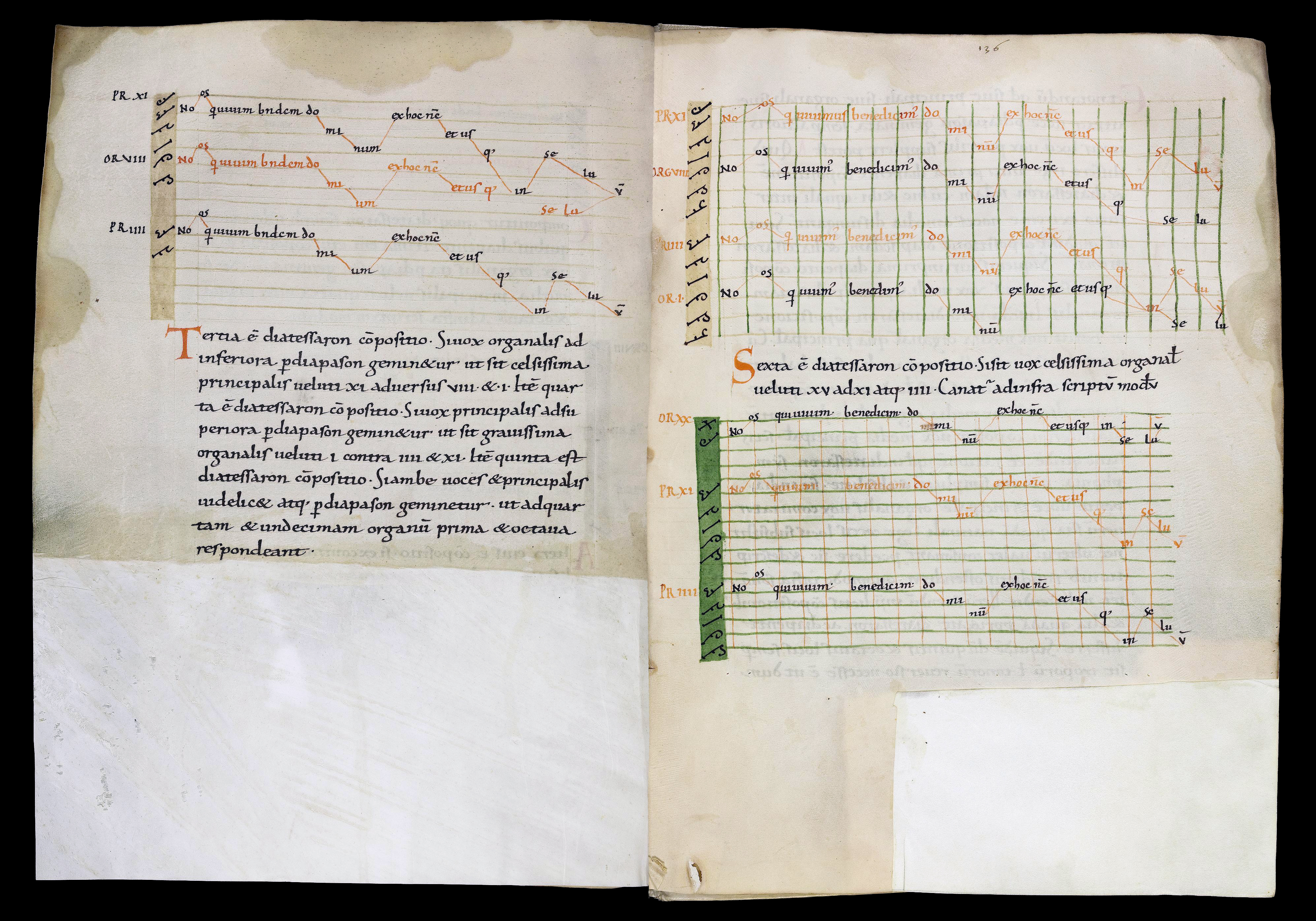
Scolica enchiriadis, excerpt from a manuscript written around 1000.

Scolica enchiriadis is an anonymous ninth-century music theory treatise and commentary on its companion work, the Musica enchiriadis. These treatises were once attributed to Hucbald, but this is no longer accepted.

The Scolica enchiriadis is written as a tripartite dialogue, and despite being a commentary on the Musica enchiriadis, it is nearly three times as long. Much of the theory discussed by the treatise is indebted to Augustinian conceptions of music, especially its affirmations of the importance of mathematics to music as kindred disciplines of the quadrivium. Later sections draw heavily on the music theory of Boethius and Cassiodorus, two early medieval authors whose works on music were widely read and circulated hundreds of years after their death. The treatise makes use of the monochord to explain interval relations. The treatise also discusses singing technique, ornamentation of plainchant, and polyphony in the style of organum.

The scale used in the work, which is based on a system of tetrachords, appears to have been created solely for use in the work itself rather than taken from actual musical practice. The treatise also uses a very rare system of notation, known as Daseian notation. This notation has a number of figures which are rotated ninety degrees to represent different pitches.

A critical edition of the treatises was published in 1981, and an English translation by Raymond Erickson in 1995.

== See also ==
- Daseian notation
- Tonary
