= Ojkanje =

Polyphonic folk singing in Croatia

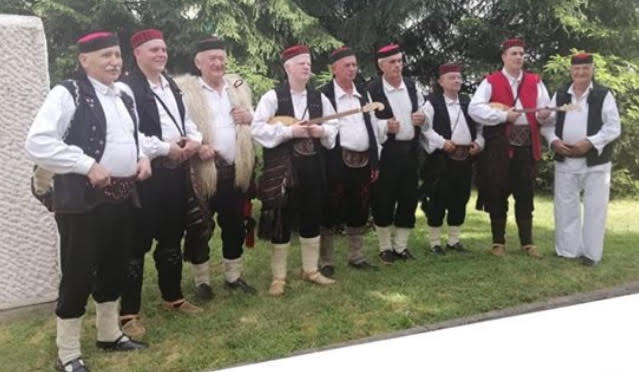
- HKUD Široka Kula from Gospić performing ličko ojkanje
- Stylistic origins: Croatian music
- Typical instruments: Human voice

Ojkanje singing
- UNESCO Intangible Cultural Heritage
- Country: Croatia
- Reference: 00320
- Region: Europe and North America

Inscription history
- Inscription: 2010 (5th session)
- List: Need of Urgent Safeguarding

Ojkanje is a tradition of polyphonic folk singing in Croatia characteristic for the regions of the Dalmatian hinterland, Velebit, Lika, Kordun, and Karlovac. As described in The Harvard Dictionary of Music: "The ojkanje is a particular style of singing melisma with a sharp and prolonged shaking of the voice on the syllables oj or hoj."

In 2010, it was inscribed as Ojkanje singing in UNESCOs List of Intangible Cultural Heritage in Need of Urgent Safeguarding.

== Geographical extent ==
Historically, ojkanje is found in the regions of the Dalmatian hinterland, Velebit, Lika, Kordun, and Karlovac, belonging to the Dinaric area, along with several neighbouring micro-regions. Dalmatian hinterland area is considered as main home of the ojkanje style and from there was expanded to other parts of Croatia. Migrations from the Dinaric region during the 16th and 17th century probably introduced this style of singing to Adriatic islands as well migration of Bunjevci from same area to Vojvodina and Hungary. The solo singing type of ojkanje is associated most with the Lika region and surrounding Karlovac, while two-part singing is dominant in the wider area of the Croatian coast and its hinterland. Specific types of ojkanje singing can be found between the rivers of Krka and Cetina (Drniška Krajina), in the regions of Ravni Kotari and Bukovica, in the Cetinska Krajina between Svilaja and Moseč, and the hinterlands of Trogir and Kaštela. The mountainous landscape of Lika the Dalmatian hinterland proved ideal for the cultivation of ojkanje.

Similar styles of polyphonic singing can be found throughout the Dinaric region of the Balkans, such as ganga, found mainly in Herzegovina and inland Dalmatia, and izvika from the Zlatibor area in Serbia. These enduring musical traditions show a connecting link among the populations of the mountainous regions. Owing to emigration, ojkanje groups can now be found in western Serbia and to a smaller extent, Bosnia and Herzegovina.

== Description ==
The main significance with ojkanje is that it is not simply a genre of singing, but a very specific voice-shaking technique originating from the throat. Ojkanje has been described as "free beat singing" that is created deep in the throat and has been steeped in the culture of various local communities. There are two main ways of performing: individually, or more commonly, with a group. Lyrics usually cover topics such as love, social or local issues, and politics.

- Solo singing, also known as "travel singing" (putničko, kiridžijsko) or "solitary singing" (samačko) has several different variants depending on the region. One example from the Konavle region is the ustresalica, a shaking type of singing which has died out amongst the community. In Lika, the rozganje type of singing was popular, and is currently kept alive by local folklore groups in the Karlovac region.
- Two-part singing can be performed by men or women with two or more people. It is prevalent in the area of the Croatian coast and the Dalmatian hinterland . In group singing, the song lasts as long as the lead singer can hold their breath. The name ojkalica, which is the name used for this type of singing in the area in the hinterland of Šibenik and the villages of Vrlika and Kijevo. Further along the Dalmatian hinterland there are various traditional vocal styles of Ojkanje singing. In Ravni Kotari and Bukovica, the local style of singing is called orzenje (the Serbian Orthodox population calls it orcenje, orcanje or groktanje). Furthermore, when performed by men, the singing is known as treskavica, or starovinsko ("old-style") today, and when performed by women it is known as vojkavica. Treskavica is also used in the hinterlands of Trogir and Kaštela, but is called grgešanje in Grebaštica, a village north of Primošten. In northern Poljice the locals continue to perform the kiridžijsko style of singing.

== History ==
Ojkanje singing originated in its form in the Dinaric region. It especially thrived among the rural population of the Dalmatian hinterland and surrounding regions.

Ivan Lovrić (1756—1777) mentions ojkanje as part of Morlach culture.

In the beginning of the 20th century, the Croatian Peasant Party began organizing folklore festivals which focused on rural traditions through their charitable wing. Traditional dancing, music, regional costumes were the main focus, especially in the 1920s and 1930s, with Ojkanje singing being an important addition.

In 2008, ojkanje singing was nominated by the Croatian Ministry of Culture for inscription on the UNESCO Urgent Safeguarding list. 2010, it was inscribed in UNESCOs List of Intangible Cultural Heritage in Need of Urgent Safeguarding as representative of Croatia.

In 2012 it was included into the national register of the intangible cultural heritage of Serbia.

== Modern day ==
Over the years, Ojkanje singing was passed down from generations, with singers learning directly from their accomplished predecessors. However, the last century has seen significant changes in the traditional rural life, with younger generations migrating to cities and modern ways overtaking certain traditional practices, resulting in the decline of Ojkanje singing.

Many folklore groups have been performing to keep Ojkanje singing alive. A prominent group, "KUD Promina" from Oklaj was formed by five locals from the area to preserve and perform their region's local Ojkanje singing, and their success insured them an appearance in the official video on UNESCO's website. Other cultural groups (KUDs) noted by UNESCO that are active in preserving Ojkanje are "Sveta Magareta" from Velika Jelsa near Karlovac, "Gacka" from Ličko Lešće, "Radovin" from Radovin, "Sveti Nikola Tavelic" from Lišane Ostrovičke, and notable people from Srijane (near Trilj) and Kokorici (near Vrgorac). Croatian public television has aired numerous programs on ojkanje groups and reviving the custom among young people. Examples of other groups include "KUD Petrova Gora - Kordun" Beograd, and "KUD Kordun - Inđija", formed by ethnic Serbs from the Kordun region of Croatia, but now perform throughout Serbia. There are numerous festivals and cultural events throughout the region that display Ojkanje singing to the public. The village of Prigrevica in Sombor, Serbia, and other places in Vojvodina settled by Military Frontiersmen has the musical tradition of Ojkanje.

== See also ==
- UNESCO Intangible Cultural Heritage Lists
- Klapa, a capella style from maritime Dalmatia
