= Enrique Planchart =

Venezuelan mathematician (1937–2021)

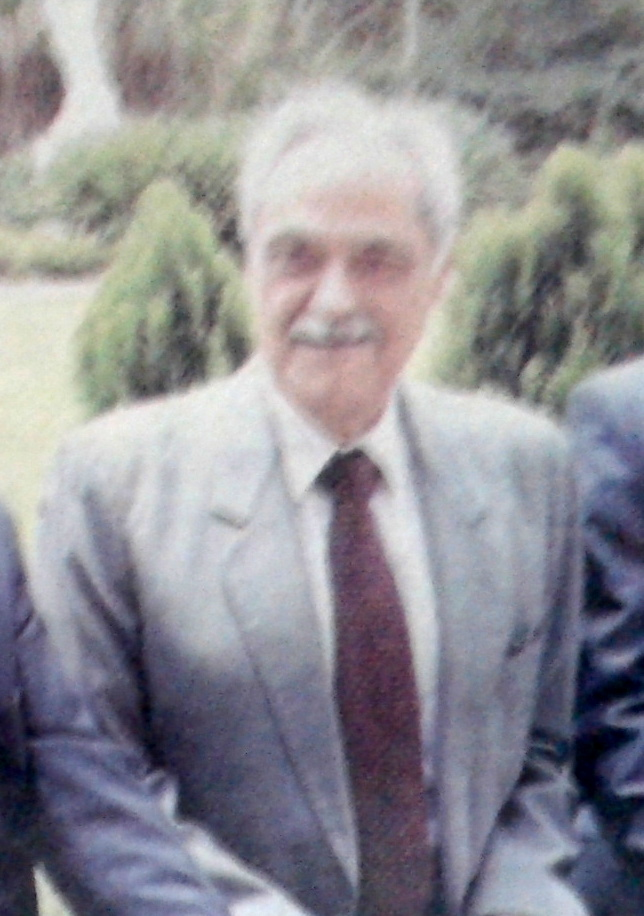
Enrique Planchart

Enrique Aurelio Planchart Rotundo (3 April 1937 – 27 July 2021) was a Venezuelan mathematician and academic. He was rector of Simón Bolívar University in Caracas from 2009 until his death in 2021.

== Career ==
Planchart graduated as a Bachelor of Science from the Central University of Venezuela and obtained his Doctorate in Mathematics from the University of California, Berkeley, where he was also a visiting professor in its Department of Mathematics between 1986 and 1987. From 1973 he was part of the Department of Pure and Applied Mathematics of the Simón Bolívar University.

While at Simón Bolívar University, between 1989 and 1999 he directed the National Center for the Improvement of Science Education, and from 1999 he directed the Equal Opportunities Program (PIO). In 1989 he was awarded the National Council for Scientific and Technological Research Award.

Throughout his scientific career, Planchart published nine books and nine journal articles and gave thirty lectures.
