= Alejandro Planchart =

Venezuelan-American musicologist, conductor, and composer (1935–2019)

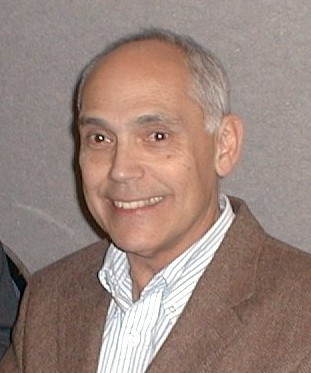
Planchart at the American Musicological Society meeting of 2002

Alejandro Enrique Planchart (29 July 1935 – 28 April 2019) was a Venezuelan-American musicologist, conductor, and composer. He was considered to be one of the leading scholars on the music of Guillaume Du Fay; more broadly, he was a specialist on music of the Middle Ages and early Renaissance music.

== Life and career ==
Alejandro Enrique Planchart was born in Caracas, Venezuela on 29 July 1935. He moved to the United States to study at Yale University, where he received the degrees of Mus.B. (1958) and Mus.M. (1960). He received his Ph.D. at Harvard University in 1971, with a dissertation on the medieval English manuscript source, the Winchester Troper, later turned into a two-volume study with edition. He taught at Yale for several years and founded the Cappella Cordina, an early-music ensemble that blended undergraduates, graduate students and members of the community. In 1977 he joined the faculty at the University of California, Santa Barbara and re-established the Cappella there. He was made Professor Emeritus of the University of California in 2006. His Festschrift, "Qui musicam in se habet": Essays in Honor of Alejandro Enrique Planchart, co-edited by Anna Zaruznaya, Bonnie Blackburn, and Stanley Boorman, was published by the American Institute of Musicology in 2015. Planchart continued to publish many articles and scholarly editions following retirement, including the magisterial two-volume, Guillaume Du Fay: The Life and Works (Cambridge University Press, 2018). He died on April 28, 2019, in Santa Barbara, California.

Among his numerous publications are entries in the New Grove Dictionary of Music and Musicians (both the 1980 edition and the 2001 edition) on Cristóbal de Morales, Clemens non Papa, Guillaume Du Fay, St. Martial, St. Gall, Venezuelan places and musicians, and other topics. In addition, he conducted numerous live performances and recording sessions, mostly of early music, many on the Lyrichord and Musical Heritage Society labels.

== Sources ==
- Biography at Early Music America
- Grove Music Online, ed. L. Macy (Accessed August 30, 2006), (subscription access) (While it contains no specific biography, Planchart wrote numerous articles for this publication, and many of his writings are referenced there)
