= Izvika =

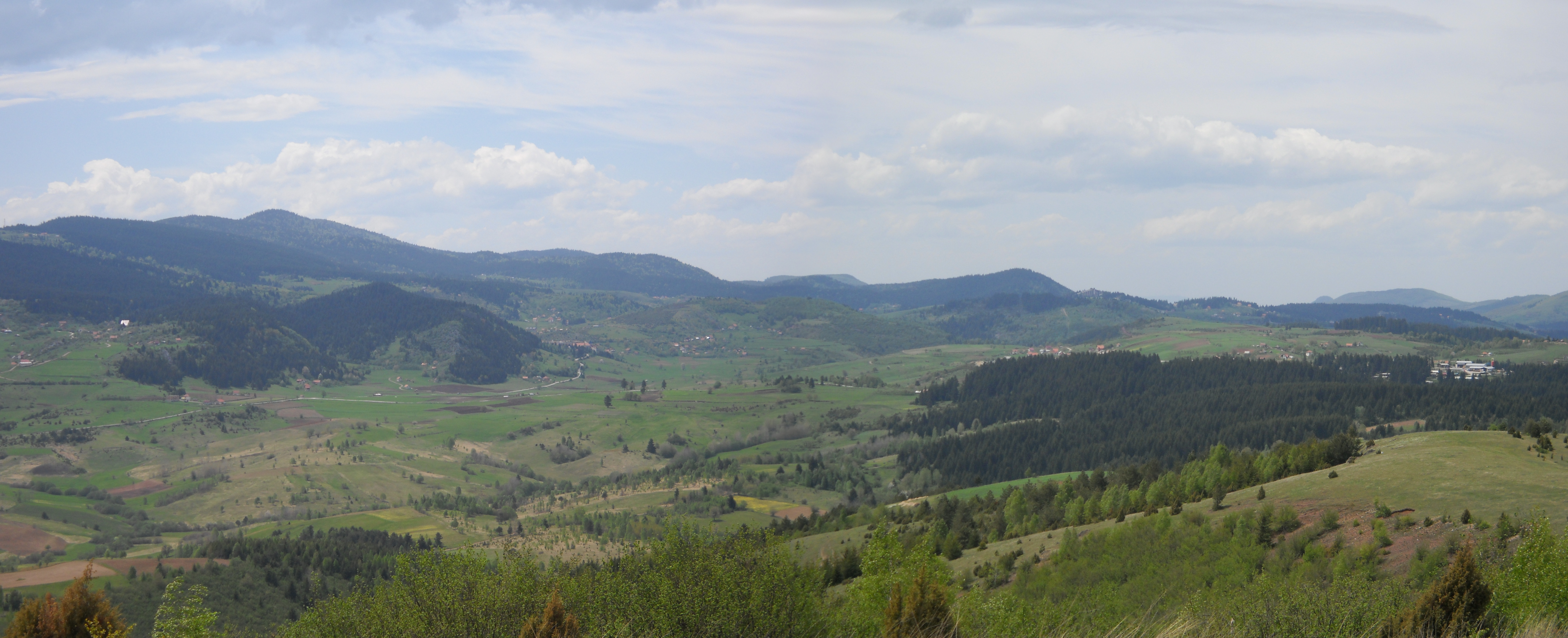
- View of the Zlatar mountains
- Stylistic origins: Traditional singing
- Typical instruments: Vocal

Izvika (Serbian Cyrillic: извика, "clamor, cry out, shout"), or kajda (кајда, from Turkish "melody"), glas (глас, Slavic "voice") or naglas (наглас), arija (арија, from Italian "air"), are names for traditional biphonic and polyphonic folk singing in Serbia found in several styles, such as in the Zlatibor region in western Serbia where it is known as izvika, in Vlasotince in southeastern Serbia where it is known as izvikački, and central Serbia where it is known as iz glasa. It is part of the traditional singing in heterophonic drone vocal form. It is sung in a duet or group, by both males and females. It is inscribed in the Cultural Heritage List of Serbia.

In the Zlatibor District in western Serbia, the tradition is found in villages in the municipalities of Arilje, Bajina Bašta, Ivanjica, Kosjerić, Nova Varoš, Požega, Priboj, Prijepolje, Užice and Čajetina. There are two styles in the Zlatibor region, the izvika or kajda, and the na bas ("on bass") or arija.

There are specific melodies to the singing depending on event, such as žetelačke (agricultural), čobanske (shepherding), sijelske (social gathering), slavske (feast days), svadbarske (weddings), etc.

A kolo folk dance, sakajdo, traditionally accompanies the singing in the Zlatibor region.

== See also ==
- Ojkanje
- Singing to the Gusle

== Sources ==
- Poznanović, Radoslav-Rade; Vlahović, Petar (1988). Création traditionelle populaire orale de la région de Užice. Etnografski institut Srpske akademije nauka i umetnosti.
- Opštinska zajednica obrazovanja (1978). Simpozijum seoski dani Sretena Vukosavljevića. Vol. 5–7. Opštinska zajednica obrazovanja.
- Vasić, Olivera; Pantelić, Nikola (1990). Narodne igre i zabave u titovoužičkom kraju. Srpska akademija nauka i umetnosti. p. 32. ISBN 9788675870029.
- Vasiljević, Miodrag A. (1960). Народне мелодије Лесковачког краја. Naučno delo.
- Radić, Violeta (2021). "Dan posvećen "pevanju na struju"". World Music Serbia.
- Нематеријално културно наслеђе Србије. "Певање из вика" [Clamor singing]. Нематеријално културно наслеђе Србије.
