= Musica enchiriadis =

Anonymous 9th-century treatise on music

Section of a 10th-century Musica enchiriadis manuscript explaining the diapason

Musica enchiriadis is an anonymous musical treatise authored during the 9th century. It is the first surviving attempt to set up a system of rules for polyphony in western art music. The treatise was once attributed to Hucbald, but this is no longer accepted. Some historians once attributed it to Odo of Cluny (879–942). It has also been attributed to Abbot Hoger (d. 906). This music theory treatise, along with its companion text, Scolica enchiriadis, was widely circulated in medieval manuscripts, often in association with Boethius' De institutione musica.

It consists of nineteen chapters; the first nine are devoted to notation, modes, and monophonic plainchant. Chapters 10–18 deal with polyphonic music. The author here shows how consonant intervals should be used to compose or improvise the type of early medieval polyphonic music called organum, an early style of note-against-note polyphony; several examples of which are included in the treatise. Scolica enchiriadis also observes that some melodies should be sung "more quickly" (celerius), others "more slowly" (morosius). The 19th chapter of Musica enchiriadis relates the legend of Orpheus.

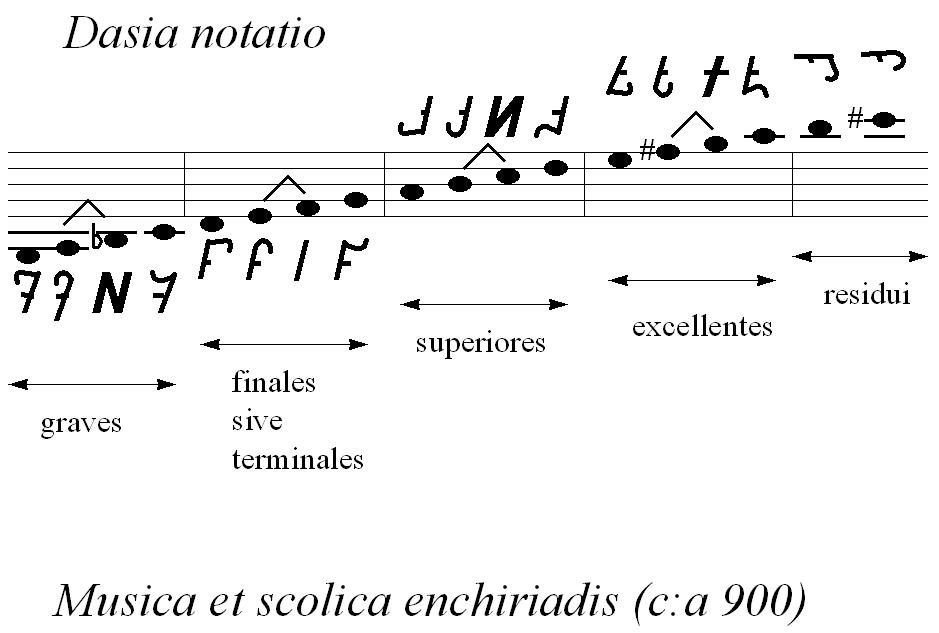
The notation used in Musica enchiriadis. The scale comprises four tetrachords. The symbols indicating the notes are rotated and mirrored depending on the tetrachords. A modern transcription of the notes is below.

The scale used in the work, which is based on a system of tetrachords, appears to have been created solely for use in the work itself, rather than taken from actual musical practice. The treatise also uses a very rare system of notation, known as Daseian notation. This notation has a number of figures which are rotated 90 degrees to represent different pitches.

A critical edition of the treatises was published in 1981, and an English translation by Raymond Erickson in 1995.

== See also ==
- Daseian notation
- Tonary
