= Winchester Troper =

English music manuscript, dated c. 1000

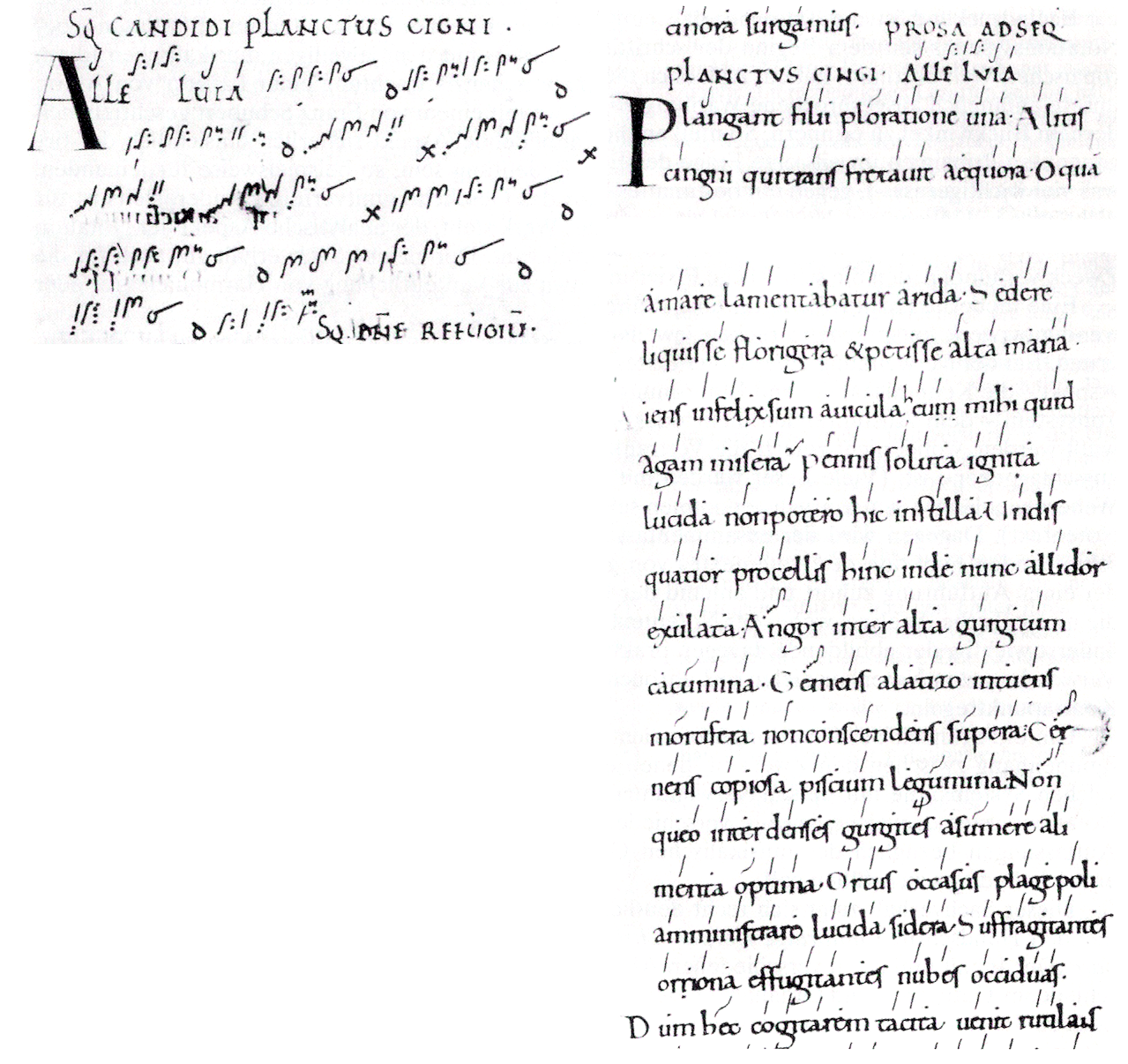
Pages from the manuscript in the Bodleian Library.

The Winchester Troper refers to two eleventh-century manuscripts of liturgical plainchant and two-voice polyphony copied and used in the Old Minster at Winchester Cathedral in Hampshire, England. The manuscripts are now held at Cambridge, Corpus Christi College 473 (Corpus 473) and Oxford, Bodleian Library Bodley 775 (Bodley 775). The term "Winchester Troper" is best understood as the repertory of music contained in the two manuscripts. Both manuscripts contain a variety of liturgical genres, including Proper and Ordinary chants for both the Mass and the Divine Office. Many of the chants can also be found in other English and Northern French tropers, graduals, and antiphoners. However, some chants are unique to Winchester, including those for local saints such as St. Æthelwold and St. Swithun, who were influential Bishops of Winchester in the previous centuries. Corpus 473 contains the most significant and largest surviving collection of eleventh-century organum (i.e. polyphony). This polyphonic repertoire is unique to that manuscript (Bodley 775 contains no polyphony).

== Manuscripts ==
In the late nineteenth century, Walter Frere and the Solesmes monks were the first to refer to these manuscripts as the "Winchester Troper." Despite the implications of the name, the manuscripts are not identical, not part of a set (such as Volume 1 and Volume 2), and contain liturgical genres other than tropes. The term "Winchester Troper" can refer to either manuscript or to the repertory of the two as a collective.

=== Dating ===
The dating of the two manuscripts has been subject of debate. The core repertory of Corpus 473 was likely copied in the 1020s-1030s. Bodley 775 was possibly copied in the 1050s. However, scholars disagree about the dating of the possible exemplars on which Bodley 775 was based. Perhaps Bodley 775 was copied directly from a now lost exemplar dating from the late 970s or 980s. Therefore, the manuscript is retrospective because it reflects practices different than those at the time it was copied. On the other hand, Bodley 775 may have been copied from two preexisting manuscripts: a late tenth-century gradual and a troper of a possibly later date. This hypothesis considers both the retrospective characteristics of Bodley 775 and its status as a later manuscript than Corpus 473. Bodley 775 was not modeled after Corpus 473.

Each manuscript contains additional chants copied by scribes throughout the eleventh century. Although the core of each manuscript reflects a connection to Northern France, the supplementary chants copied by scribes in the latter half of the eleventh century exhibit a very strong Norman influence. In 1066, William, Duke of Normandy, conquered England, strengthening the cultural connection between northern France and England. As a result, chant in England began to reflect this new political reality. This influence is especially strong in the later sequences of the Winchester Troper; increasing Norman influence did not impact the Alleluia series. Thus, while the core of each manuscript dates to Anglo-Saxon England, they also contain some post-Conquest music.

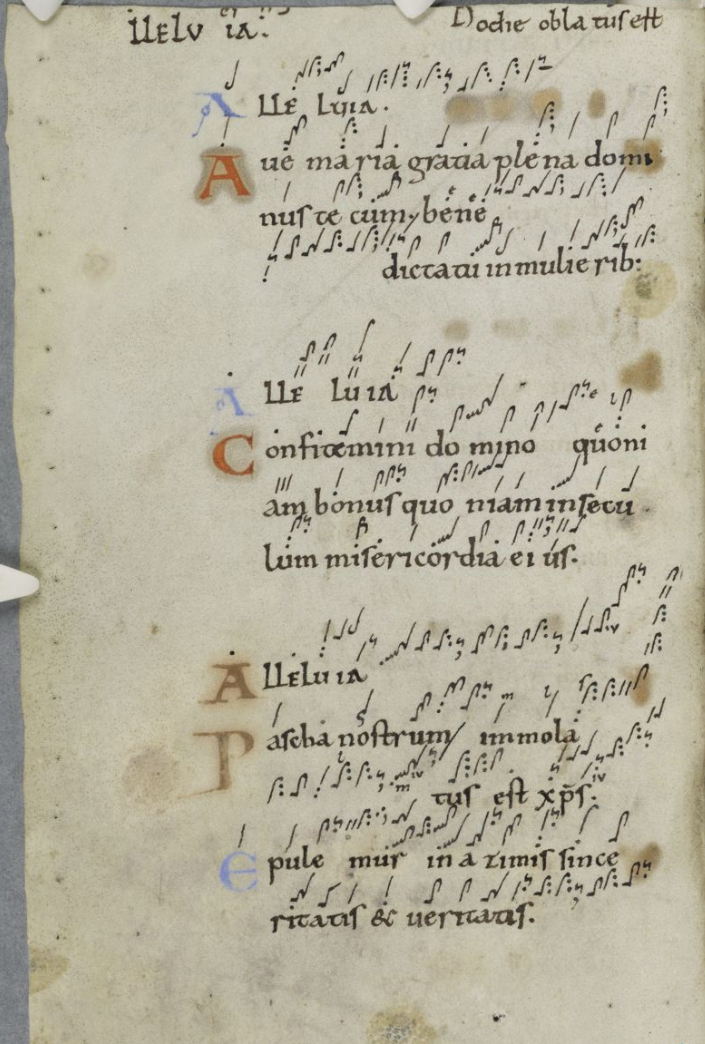
The Winchester Troper held at Cambridge, Corpus Christi College 473. Pictured is folio 3 v., which contains Alleluias for Epiphany, Purification of the Blessed Virgin Mary, and the Easter season.

=== Physical description ===
Corpus 473 contains 199 folios of parchment with dimensions of 140/145 x 90/93 mm. The final folio dates to the sixteenth century and is not original to the manuscript. The complete manuscript was rebound and conserved in 2004. It is written mostly in dark brown ink with colored capitals; the handwriting is Caroline minuscule. Corpus 473 may have been used by the succentor or cantor of the Old Minster and Bodley 775 by its cantor.

Bodley 775 contains 191 folios of parchment of the size 273 x 167 mm. The manuscript retains its eleventh-century binding, consisting of two quarter-cut oak boards covered in whittawed skin. The first quire (ff. 1-7^{v}, col. 1 seven) is a later eleventh-century addition and is misbound, with the original sequence of leaves being 1-3, 5, 6, 4, 7. The remainder of the book is organized in quires of 8, with half sheets appearing in quires 3, 12, 14, 16, 20 and 23. It is written in black and brown ink with red rubrics and colored initials. Some proses were subsequently erased and cannot be recovered.

Although Wulfstan the Cantor was once thought to have a direct role in the copying of these manuscripts (and perhaps even composing the organa of Corpus 473), more recent dating makes this impossible because the manuscripts are now believed to have been copied after Wulfstan's death. The organa were possibly composed by several people at Winchester and represented the best attempts at improvised polyphony that were deemed worthy of memory.

== Overview of contents ==
Corpus 473 and Bodley 775 share much of the same music for many of the same feasts, but there are some notable differences between the contents and organization of the two manuscripts. Corpus 473 contains the voces organales (Latin: organal voices) to 174 organa, making it the largest extant collection of liturgical polyphony in the eleventh century, while Bodley 775 contains no such organa. Both manuscripts contain both proper and ordinary tropes for the Mass and Divine Office, proses, and sequences. In Corpus 473, different genres are grouped into different gatherings. Within each genre, the chants are organized according to the liturgical calendar. The organization of Bodley 775 is not nearly as systematic. Although pieces of similar genres are generally grouped together, each genre is not placed in a distinct fascicle, and chants are sometimes mistakenly placed out of liturgical order or under the incorrect rubric. Unlike Corpus 473, Bodley 775 separates the tropes for feasts of the Temporale and Sactorale. Corpus 473 contains only half of an Alleluia cycle; it is possible that a gathering containing the second half of the cycle has been lost. The two tables below list the general contents of the two manuscripts. However, because later additions were often copied wherever there was available space, not every piece is accounted for in the tables. For instance, in Corpus 473 two proses, copied in the late eleventh century, are located at the end of the early eleventh century Alleluia cycle and are not listed below.

Contents of Corpus 473
Genre	Gathering	Folio	Quantity
Alleluia cycle	1	1-8	44
Proper tropes	2-6	9-54	
Ordinary tropes and tonary	7-9	55-80	4 Kyrie tropes 10 Kyries (one is later) 17 Gloria tropes 6 Sanctus tropes 1 Sanctus 6 Agnus dei tropes
Sequences	10	81-88	52
Proses	11-15	89-134	51
Organa	16-21	135-190	174
Later material	22	191-198v	

Contents of Bodley 775
Genre	Gathering	Folio	Quantity
Later material	1	1r-7v	
Proper tropes	2-8	8r-61v	
Ordinary tropes	8-10	62r-76r	4 Kyrie tropes 11 Kyries 13 Gloria tropes 6 Sanctus tropes 2 Sanctus 6 Agnus dei tropes
Alleluia cycle	10-11	76v-87v	107 (core repertory) 4 (late 11th c.)
Tract cycle	12-13	88r-97r	25
Offertory cycle (with verses)	13-16	97v-121v	100
Sequences	16-17	121r-129r	51
Proses	17, 18-24	130r-190v	11 (late 11th through early 12th c.) approx. 64 (core repertory, some erased) 14 (late 11th through early 12th c.)

== Tropes ==
The Winchester Troper is partly a troper (i.e. a book of tropes). It contains Gregorian chant and tropes, which are musical or textual (or both) expansions of Gregorian chant. Corpus 473 and Bodley 775 contain several introit tropes for feasts of St. Swithun, a ninth century Bishop of Winchester. Some of the introit tropes for St. Swithun are unique to this repertory. St. Swithun is also represented in Offertory and Communion tropes. Both manuscripts contain tropes for various Sanctorale and Temporale feasts, including Christmas, Advent, Epiphany, Pentecost, All Saints, St. Stephen, St. Gregory, and the Innocents. Other local saints, like St. Æthelwold and St. Justus (Iustus), are also represented.

The two manuscripts contain nearly the same proper tropes with some significant exceptions. Bodley 775 contains fewer Communion and Offertory tropes than Corpus 473. Generally, trope repertories across Europe shrank during the eleventh century, meaning the lower number of tropes in Bodley 775 could reflect a later stage of compilation than Corpus 473. This corroborates the claim that Bodley 775 is based on an earlier gradual but a more recent troper, possible one that dates after Corpus 473. Between the two manuscripts, 37 tropes are almost certainly English in origin, while another 48 are of probable English origin. Some of these tropes are also found in other English or North French sources, but many are unique to Winchester. It is often difficult to determine the origin of a specific chant and is subject to interpretation.

== The organa and their reconstruction ==
Corpus 473 contains 174 organal parts of two-part organum pieces, the largest surviving collection of eleventh century polyphony. The polyphony consists of two voices, a vox principalis (Latin plural, voces principales; English, principal voice[s]) and a vox organalis (Latin plural, voces organales; English, organal voice[s]). The vox principalis is a previously composed chant; the vox organalis is a newly composed part in counterpoint with the chant. The organal voices seem to follow a general contour below the principal voices, beginning with parallel movement in fourths, then oblique movement (including the use of holding tones), then meeting in unison at points of ocursus. The gatherings of Corpus 473 dedicated to organa contain only the voces organales. Singers would have performed the principal voice from a different gathering, another manuscript, or, more likely, from memory. Among the genres that receive organal treatment are troped and untroped Mass Ordinary chants, tracts, sequences, Mass Proper tropes, Alleluias, and Office Responsories.

Because the notation consists of adiestematic neumes, which indicate the melodic contour but not precise pitches, the organal voices were long considered to be indecipherable. However, Andreas Holschneider and, more recently, Susan Rankin have published reconstructions of some of the organa. To reconstruct the organa, Rankin matches the organal voice with a chant melody. To determine the best match, she examines the notation of the organal voice against various chant melodies that use the same text. Theoretical rules found in treatises, such as Musica enchiriadis and Guido of Arezzo's Micrologus, are necessary to reconstruct the organal voice. Significantly, the neume shapes and contour of the organal voice sometimes break from the theory. Because Corpus 473 contains multiple organal harmonies to the same melodic gesture, the monks at Winchester exercised a certain degree of compositional freedom when writing organa. Rankin suggests that the composer(s) of organa were engaged in a creative and aesthetic practice, a different conclusion from Holschneider's assessment that the organal voice was precisely bound to the rules of theory.

== Bibliography ==
=== Recordings ===
- "Christmas in Royal Anglo-Saxon Winchester," Herald AV Publications, HAVPCD151, sung by the Schola Gregoriana of Cambridge, directed by Mary Berry.
- "Music for a King: The Winchester Troper," AECD 1436, sung by Discantus, directed by Briggite Lesne.

=== Manuscripts ===
- Cambridge, Corpus Christi College 473.
- Oxford, Bodleian Library Bodley 775.

=== Scholarship ===
Arlt, Wulf (1993). "Stylistic Layers in Eleventh-Century Polyphony: How Can Continental Sources Contribute to Our Understanding of the Winchester Organa?". In Rankin, Susan; Hiley, David (eds.). Music in the Medieval English Liturgy: Plainsong & Mediaeval Music Society Centennial Essays. Oxford: Clarendon Press.

Frere, Walter Howard (1894). The Winchester troper from MSS. of the Xth and XIth centuries with other documents illustrating the history of tropes in England and France. London: Henry Bradshaw Society.

Handschin, J. (January 1936; April 1936). "The Two Winchester Tropers". Journal of Theological Studies. 37. nos. 145-146.

Hiley, David; Rankin, Susan, eds. (1993). Music in the Medieval English Liturgy. Plainsong & Mediaeval Music Society Centennial Essays. Oxford: Clarendon Press. ISBN 0-19-316125-7.

Hiley, David (1990). "Editing the Winchester Sequence Repertory of ca. 1000". In Dobszay, László; Halász, Péter; Mezei, János; Prószéky, Gábor (eds.). Cantus Planus: Papers Read at the Third Meeting, Tihany, Hungary 19-24 September 1988. Budapest: Hungarian Academy of Sciences Institute for Musicology.

Hiley, David (1994). "Changes in English Chant Repertories in the Eleventh Century as Reflected in the Winchester Sequences". In Chibnall, Marjorie (ed.). Anglo-Norman Studies XVI. Proceeding of the Battle Conference 1993. Rochester, NY: Boydell Press.

Hiley, David (1995). “The Repertory of Sequences at Winchester.” In Boone, Graeme M. (ed). Essays on Medieval Music on Honor of David G. Hughes. In Boone, Greame M. (ed.). Isham Library Papers 4. Cambridge, MA: Harvard University Press.

Hiley, David (1998). “The English Benedictine Version of the Historia Sancti Gregorii and the Date of the ‘Winchester Troper’ (Cambridge, Corpus Christi College, 473).” In Dobszay, László (ed.). Cantus Planus: Papers Read at the Seventh Meeting, Sopron, 1995. Budapest: Hungarian Academy of Sciences Institute for Musicology.

Huglo, Michel (1993). Rankin, Susan; Hiley, David (eds.). Music in the Medieval English Liturgy: Plainsong & Mediaeval Music Society Centennial Essays. Oxford: Clarendon Press.

Holschneider, Andreas (1968). Die Organa von Winchester : Studien zum ältesten Repertoire polyphoner Musik. Hildesheim: G. Olms.

Planchart, Alejandro Enrique (1977). The Repertory of Tropes at Winchester. 2 Vols. Princeton: Princeton University Press.

Rankin, Susan (1993). "Winchester Polyphony: The Early Theory and Practice of Organum". In Rankin, Susan; Hiley, David (eds.). Music in the Medieval English Liturgy: Plainsong and Mediaeval Music Society Centennial Essays. Oxford: Clarendon Press.

Rankin, Susan (2007). The Winchester Troper: Facsimile Edition and Introduction. London: Stainer and Bell. ISBN 0-85249-894-2.

Rankin, Susan (2008). “Music for a Late Anglo-Saxon Benedictine Abbey: The Winchester Troper.” British Academy Review, no. 11.

Rankin, Susan (2015). "Organa dulcisona docto modulamine compta: Rhetoric and Musical Composition in the Winchester Organa". In Zayaruznaya, Anna; Blackburn, Bonnie J.; Boorman, Stanley (eds.). Qui musicam in se habet: Studies in Honor of Alejandro Enrique Planchart. Middleton, Wisconsin: American Institute of Musicology.
