= Polyphony =

Simultaneous lines of independent melody

Sample of polyphony
A bar from J.S. Bach's "Fugue No.17 in A flat," BWV 862, from Das Wohltemperierte Clavier (Part I), a famous example of contrapuntal polyphony.

Polyphony (/pəˈlɪfəni/ pə-LIF-ə-nee) is a type of musical texture consisting of two or more simultaneous lines of independent melody, as opposed to a musical texture with just one voice (monophony) or a texture with one dominant melodic voice accompanied by chords (homophony).

In the Western musical tradition, the term polyphony is usually used to refer to music of the late Middle Ages and Renaissance. Baroque forms such as fugue, which might be called polyphonic, are usually described instead as contrapuntal. Also, as opposed to the species terminology of counterpoint, polyphony was generally either "pitch-against-pitch" (sometimes called "point-against-point") or a sustained-pitch in one part with melismas in another. In all cases the concept was probably what Margaret Bent (1999) calls "dyadic counterpoint", with each part being written generally against one other part, with parts modified at the end if necessary. This point-against-point concept is opposed to "successive composition", where voices were written in an order with each new voice fitting into the previous construction.

The term polyphony is also sometimes used more broadly, to describe any musical texture that is not monophonic. Such a perspective considers homophony as a sub-type of polyphony.

== Antecedents ==
Polyphony in traditional music has a wide, if uneven, distribution among the peoples of the world. Most polyphonic regions of the world are in sub-Saharan Africa, Europe and Oceania. There are two contradictory approaches to explaining the origins of vocal polyphony: the Cultural Model and the Evolutionary Model. According to the Cultural Model, the origins of polyphony are connected to the development of human musical culture; polyphony came about as the natural development of primordial monophonic singing; this leads to polyphonic traditions gradually replacing monophonic traditions. According to the Evolutionary Model, polyphonic singing is connected to earlier stages of human evolution, as an important part of a hominid defence system, and traditions of polyphony are gradually disappearing all over the world.

== Origins of written polyphony ==
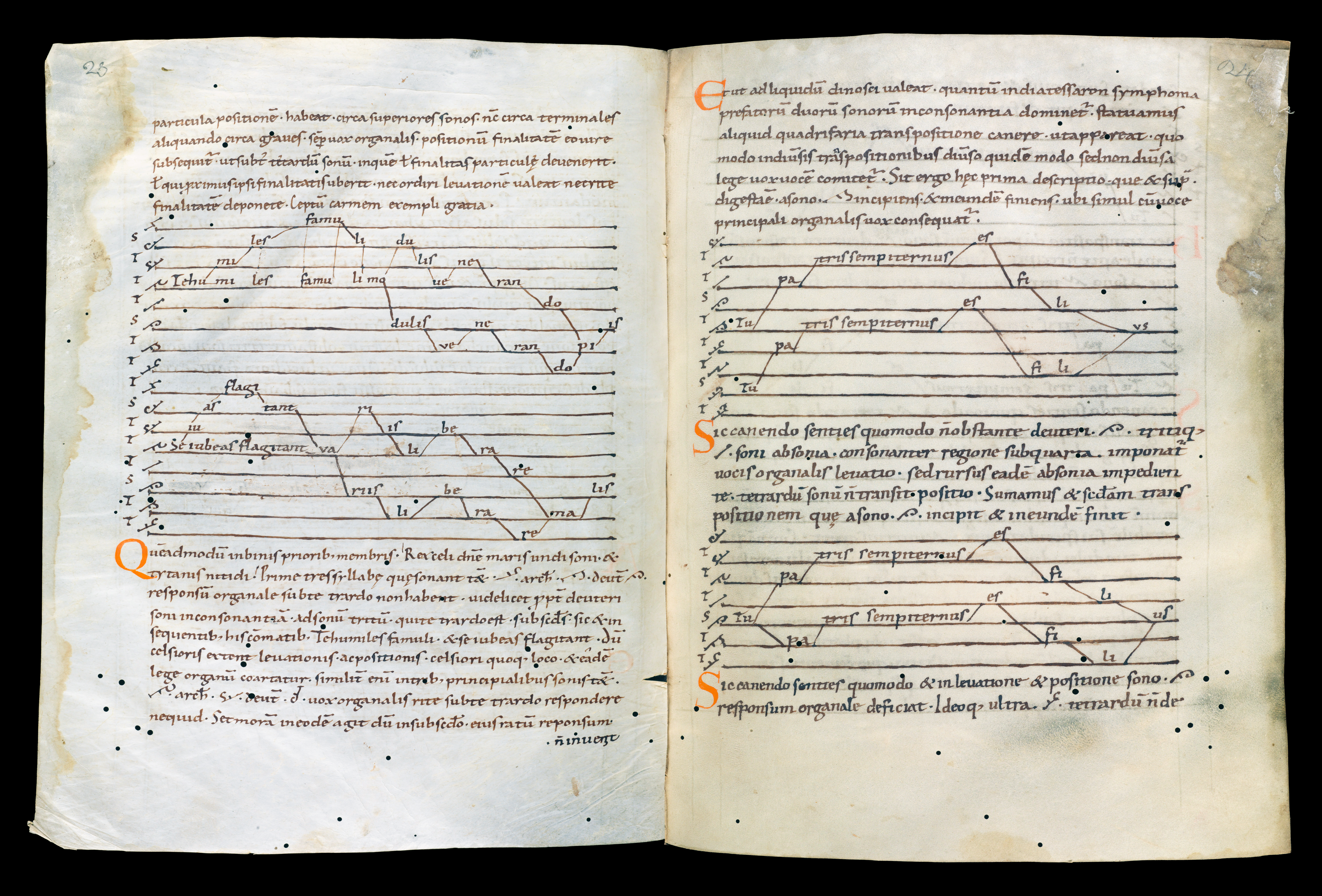
Polyphony in a 10th-century manuscript of Musica enchiriadis

Although the exact origins of polyphony in the Western church traditions are unknown, the treatises Musica enchiriadis and Scolica enchiriadis, both from c. 900, are usually considered the oldest extant written examples of polyphony. These treatises provided examples of two-voice note-against-note embellishments of chants using parallel octaves, fifths, and fourths. Rather than being fixed works, they indicated ways of improvising polyphony during performance. The Winchester Troper, from c. 1000, is generally considered to be the oldest extant example of notated polyphony for chant performance, although the notation does not indicate precise pitch levels or durations. A two-part antiphon to Saint Boniface recently discovered in the British Library, is thought to have originated in a monastery in north-west Germany and may be earlier, having been dated to the early tenth century.

== European polyphony ==
=== Historical context ===
European polyphony rose out of melismatic organum, the earliest harmonization of the chant. During the 12th century, composers such as Léonin and Pérotin developed the organum that had been introduced centuries earlier, and added a third and fourth voice to the now homophonic chant. In the 13th century, the chant-based tenor was becoming altered, fragmented, and hidden beneath secular tunes, obscuring the sacred texts, as composers continued to develop polyphonic techniques. The lyrics of love poems might be sung above sacred texts in the form of a trope, or the sacred text might be placed within a familiar secular melody. The oldest surviving piece of six-part music is the English rota Sumer is icumen in (c. 1240).

=== Western Europe and Roman Catholicism ===
European polyphony rose prior to, and during the period of the Western Schism. Avignon, the seat of popes and then antipopes, was a vigorous center of secular music-making, much of which influenced sacred polyphony.

The notion of secular and sacred music merging in the papal court also offended some medieval ears. It gave church music more of a jocular performance quality supplanting the solemnity of worship they were accustomed to. The use of and attitude toward polyphony varied widely in the Avignon court from the beginning to the end of its religious importance in the 14th century.

Harmony was considered frivolous, impious, lascivious, and an obstruction to the audibility of the words. Instruments, as well as certain modes, were actually forbidden in the church because of their association with secular music and pagan rites. After banishing polyphony from the Liturgy in 1322, Pope John XXII warned against the unbecoming elements of this musical innovation in his 1324 bull Docta sanctorum patrum. In contrast Pope Clement VI indulged in it.

The oldest extant polyphonic setting of the mass attributable to one composer is Guillaume de Machaut's Messe de Nostre Dame, dated to 1364, during the pontificate of Pope Urban V. The Second Vatican Council said Gregorian chant should be the focus of liturgical services, without excluding other forms of sacred music, including polyphony.

==== Notable works and composers ====
- Tomás Luis de Victoria
- William Byrd, Mass for Five Voices
- Thomas Tallis, Spem in alium
- Orlandus Lassus, Prophetiae Sibyllarum
- Guillaume de Machaut, Messe de Nostre Dame
- Geoffrey Chaucer
- Jacob Obrecht
- Palestrina, Missa Papae Marcelli
- Josquin des Prez, Missa Pange Lingua
- Gregorio Allegri, Miserere

=== Protestant Britain and the United States ===
English Protestant west gallery music included polyphonic multi-melodic harmony, including fuguing tunes, by the mid-18th century. This tradition passed with emigrants to North America, where it was proliferated in tunebooks, including shape-note books like The Southern Harmony and The Sacred Harp. While this style of singing has largely disappeared from British and North American sacred music, it survived in the rural Southern United States, until it again began to grow a following throughout the United States and even in places such as the United Kingdom, Germany, Poland, and Australia, among others.

=== Balkan region ===
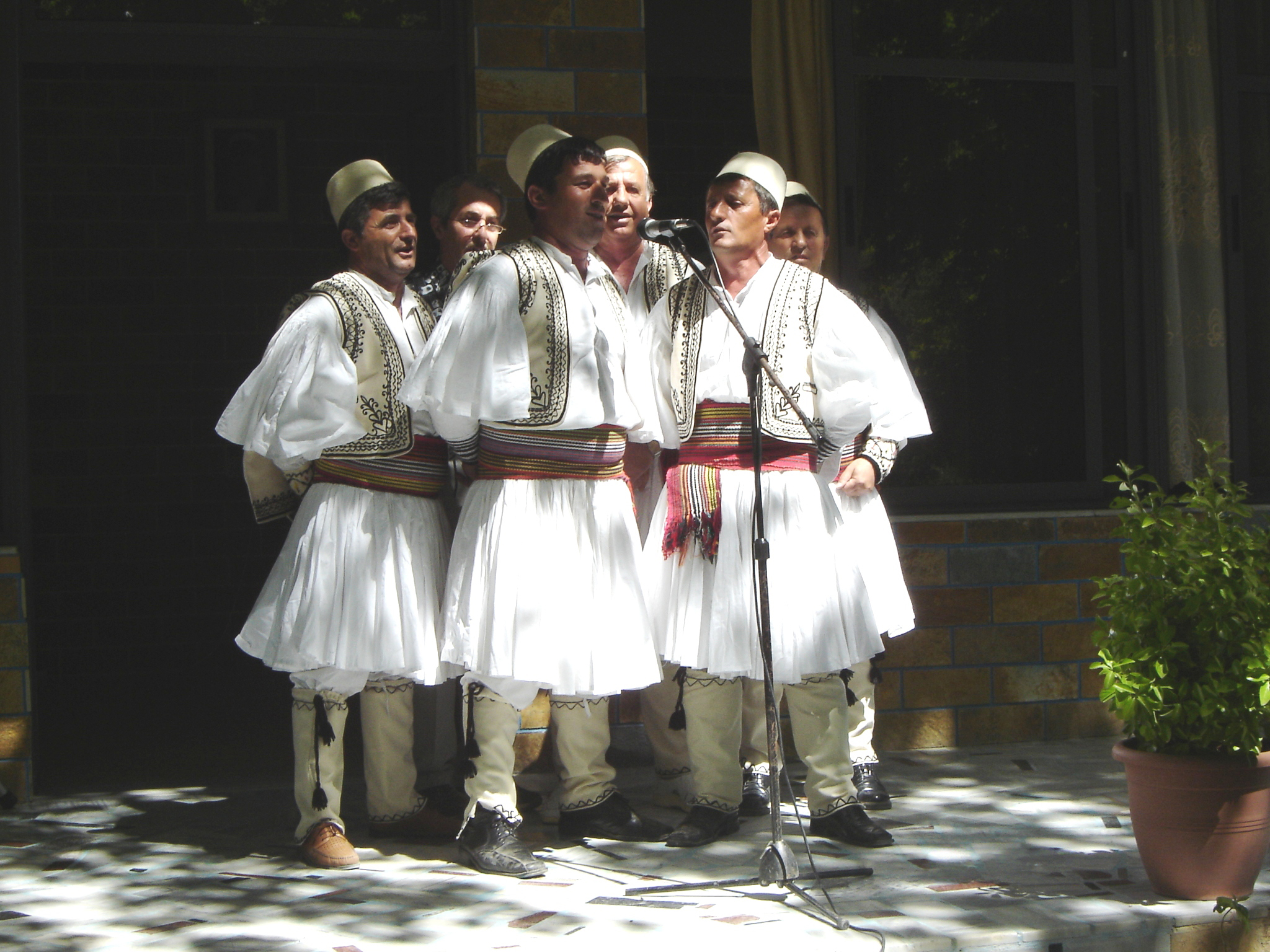
Albanian polyphonic folk group wearing qeleshe and fustanella in Skrapar

Polyphonic singing is traditional folk singing of this part of southern Europe. It is also called ancient, archaic or old-style singing.

- Byzantine chant
- Ojkanje singing, in Croatia, Serbia and Bosnia and Herzegovina
- Ganga singing, in Croatia, Montenegro and Bosnia and Herzegovina
- Bosnian root music in the Podrinje region of Bosnia and Herzegovina
- Epirote singing, in northern Greece and southern Albania (see below)
- Iso-polyphony, in southern Albania (see below)
- Gusle singing, in Serbia, Montenegro, Bosnia and Herzegovina, Croatia and Albania
- Izvika singing, in Serbia
- Dvuglas singing in Southern Bulgaria: woman choirs in Shopluk (Bistritsa Babi) and in Rhodopes (Nedelino), as well as men choirs in Bansko, Pirin Macedonia

Incipient polyphony (previously primitive polyphony) includes antiphony and call and response, drones, and parallel intervals.

Balkan drone music is described as polyphonic due to Balkan musicians using a literal translation of the Greek polyphōnos ('many voices'). In terms of Western classical music, it is not strictly polyphonic, due to the drone parts having no melodic role, and can better be described as multipart.

The polyphonic singing tradition of Epirus is a form of traditional folk polyphony practiced among Aromanians, Albanians, Greeks, Bulgarians and ethnic Macedonians in southern Albania and northwestern Greece. This type of folk vocal tradition is also found in North Macedonia and Bulgaria.

Albanian polyphonic singing can be divided into two major stylistic groups as performed by the Tosks and Labs of southern Albania. The drone is performed in two ways: among the Tosks, it is always continuous and sung on the syllable 'e', using staggered breathing; while among the Labs, the drone is sometimes sung as a rhythmic tone, performed to the text of the song. It can be differentiated between two-, three- and four-voice polyphony.

In Aromanian music, polyphony is common, and polyphonic music follows a set of common rules.

The phenomenon of Albanian folk iso-polyphony (Albanian iso-polyphony) has been proclaimed by UNESCO a "Masterpiece of the Oral and Intangible Heritage of Humanity". The term iso refers to the drone, which accompanies the iso-polyphonic singing and is related to the ison of Byzantine church music, where the drone group accompanies the song.

=== Corsica ===
The French island of Corsica has a unique style of music called Paghjella that is known for its polyphony. Traditionally, Paghjella contains a staggered entrance and continues with the three singers carrying independent melodies. This music tends to contain much melisma and is sung in a nasal temperament. Additionally, many paghjella songs contain a picardy third. After paghjella's revival in the 1970s, it mutated. In the 1980s it had moved away from some of its more traditional features as it became much more heavily produced and tailored towards western tastes. There were now four singers, significantly less melisma, it was much more structured, and it exemplified more homophony. To the people of Corsica, the polyphony of paghjella represented freedom; it had been a source of cultural pride in Corsica and many felt that this movement away from the polyphonic style meant a movement away from paghjella's cultural ties. This resulted in a transition in the 1990s. Paghjella again had a strong polyphonic style and a less structured meter.

=== Sardinia ===
Cantu a tenore is a traditional style of polyphonic singing in Sardinia.

== Caucasus region ==
=== Georgia ===
Polyphony in the Republic of Georgia is arguably the oldest polyphony in the Christian world. Georgian polyphony is traditionally sung in three parts with strong dissonances, parallel fifths, and a unique tuning system based on perfect fifths. Georgian polyphonic singing has been proclaimed by UNESCO an Intangible Cultural Heritage of Humanity. Popular singing has a highly valued place in Georgian culture. There are three types of polyphony in Georgia: complex polyphony, which is common in Svaneti; polyphonic dialogue over a bass background, prevalent in the Kakheti region in Eastern Georgia; and contrasted polyphony with three partially improvised sung parts, characteristic of western Georgia. The Chakrulo song, which is sung at ceremonies and festivals and belongs to the first category, is distinguished by its use of metaphor and its yodel, the krimanchuli and a "cockerel’s crow", performed by a male falsetto singer. Some of these songs are linked to the cult of the grapevine and many date back to the eighth century. The songs traditionally pervaded all areas of everyday life, ranging from work in the fields (the Naduri, which incorporates the sounds of physical effort into the music) to songs to curing of illnesses and to Christmas Carols (Alilo). Byzantine liturgical hymns also incorporated the Georgian polyphonic tradition to such an extent that they became a significant expression of it.

=== Chechens and Ingushes ===
Chechen and Ingush traditional music can be defined by their tradition of vocal polyphony. Chechen and Ingush polyphony is based on a drone and is mostly three-part, unlike most other north Caucasian traditions' two-part polyphony. The middle part carries the main melody accompanied by a double drone, holding the interval of a fifth around the melody. Intervals and chords are often dissonances (sevenths, seconds, fourths), and traditional Chechen and Ingush songs use sharper dissonances than other North Caucasian traditions. The specific cadence of a final, dissonant three-part chord, consisting of fourth and the second on top (c-f-g), is almost unique. (Only in western Georgia do a few songs finish on the same dissonant c-f-g chord.)

== Oceania ==
Parts of Oceania maintain rich polyphonic traditions. The peoples of New Guinea Highlands including the Moni, Dani, and Yali use vocal polyphony, as do the people of Manus Island. Many of these styles are drone-based or feature close, secondal harmonies dissonant to western ears. Guadalcanal and the Solomon Islands are host to instrumental polyphony, in the form of bamboo panpipe ensembles. Europeans were surprised to find drone-based and dissonant polyphonic singing in Polynesia. Polynesian traditions were then influenced by Western choral church music, which brought counterpoint into Polynesian musical practice.

== Africa ==
Numerous Sub-Saharan African music traditions host polyphonic singing, typically moving in parallel motion. While the Maasai people traditionally sing with drone polyphony, other East African groups use more elaborate techniques. The Dorze people, for example, sing with as many as six parts, and the Wagogo use counterpoint. The music of African Pygmies (e.g. that of the Aka people) is typically ostinato and contrapuntal, featuring yodeling. Other Central African peoples tend to sing with parallel lines rather than counterpoint. In Burundi, rural women greet each other with akazehe, a two-part interlocking vocal rhythm. The singing of the San people, like that of the pygmies, features melodic repetition, yodeling, and counterpoint. The singing of neighboring Bantu peoples, like the Zulu, is more typically parallel. The peoples of tropical West Africa traditionally use parallel harmonies rather than counterpoint.

== See also ==
- Micropolyphony
- Polyphonic Era
- Venetian polychoral style
