= 1534 in poetry =

List of years in poetry	(table)
- … 1524; 1525; 1526; 1527; 1528; 1529; 1530; 1531; 1532; 1533; 1534; 1535; 1536; 1537; 1538; 1539; 1540; 1541; 1542; 1543; 1544 …
- In literature 1531 1532 1533 1534 1535 1536 1537
- Art; Archaeology; Architecture; Literature; Music; Philosophy; Science; +...

Nationality words link to articles with information on the nation's poetry or literature (for instance, Irish or France).

== Events ==
- Louise Labé met Clément Marot in the salon of William Scève's brother Maurice.

== Works published ==
- John Lydgate, published anonymously, Life of St. Alban and St. Amphibalus, translated from French into English

== Births ==
Death years link to the corresponding "[year] in poetry" article:

- June 3 – Hosokawa Fujitaka 細川藤孝, also known as Hosokawa Yūsai 細川幽斎 (died 1610), a Japanese, Sengoku period feudal warlord and poet
- October 18 – Jean Passerat (died 1602), French political satirist and poet
- Also:
- March 19 – Joseph of Anchieta (died 1597), Spanish Jesuit poet and playwright
  - George Gascoigne, birth year uncertain (died 1577), English poet
  - Lucas de Heere (died 1584), Flemish portrait painter, poet and writer
  - Fernando de Herrera (died 1597), Spanish
  - Rabbi Isaac Luria (died 1572), Jewish mystic and poet in Palestine

== Deaths ==
Birth years link to the corresponding "[year] in poetry" article:

== See also ==
- Poetry
- 16th century in poetry
- 16th century in literature
- French Renaissance literature
- Renaissance literature
- Spanish Renaissance literature
