= 16th century in poetry =

== Works published ==
- Hamzah Fansuri writes in the Malay language.
- The compilation of Romances de los Señores de Nueva España, a collection of Aztec poetry (including pre-Columbian works).

== Births and deaths ==
=== England ===
- John Skelton (c. 1460–1529)
- George Gascoigne (1535–1578)
- Sir Walter Raleigh (1552–1618)
- Edmund Spenser (1552–1599)
- Sir Philip Sidney (1554–1586)
- Christopher Marlowe (1564–1593)
- William Shakespeare (1564–1616)
- John Donne (c. 1572–1631)
- Ben Jonson (c. 1572–1637)
- Robert Herrick (1591–1674)
- George Herbert (1593–1633)
- Young William (c. 1395-1433)

=== France ===
- Jean Molinet (1435–1507), French poet, chronicler, and composer
- Olivier de la Marche (1426–1501), French poet and author
- Clément Marot (1496–1544)
- Marguerite de Navarre (1492–1549)
- Bonaventure des Périers (c. 1501 – 1544)
- Louise Labe (1526–1566)
- Maurice Sceve (1511–1564)
- Pierre de Ronsard (1524–1585)
- Joachim du Bellay (1525–1560)
- Jean de Sponde (1557–1595)
- Jean de la Ceppede (1550–1622)
- Agrippa d'Aubigne (1550–1630)
- François de Malherbe (1555–1628)

==== French-language Swiss ====
- Théodore-Agrippa d'Aubigné (1552–1630)
- Simon Goulart (1583–1628)

=== Germany ===
- Erasmus Alberus (c. 1500–1553)
- Johann Valentin Andreae (1586–1654)
- Johann Beltz (1529–1584)
- Sebastian Brant (1457 or 1458 – 1521)
- Conrad Celtis (1459–1508)
- Nikolaus Decius (1485 – after 1546)
- Johann Fischart (1546 or 1547 – 1591)
- Hans Folz (1435/1440 – 1513)
- Sebastian Franck (1499 – 1542 or 1543)
- Konrad Gesner (1516–1565)
- Johann Heermann (1585–1647)
- Nikolaus Herman (c. 1500–1561)
- Mathias Holtzwart (c. 1540 – after 1589)
- Anna Ovena Hoyer (1584–1655)
- Ulrich von Hutten(1488–1523)
- Georg List (1532–1596)
- Ambrosius Lobwasser (1515–1585)
- Martin Luther (1483–1546)
- Philipp Melanchthon (1497–1560)
- Thomas Müntzer (c. 1489–1525)
- Philipp Nicolai (1556–1608)
- Martin Opitz (1597–1639)
- Jakob Regnart (between 1540 and 1545 – 1599)
- Adam Reusner (1471/1496 – 1563/1582)
- Bartholomäus Ringwaldt (1532 – c. 1599)
- Hans Sachs (1494–1576)
- Paulus Schede Melissus (1539–1602)
- Johann Hermann Schein (1586–1630)
- Johannes Secundus (1511–1536)
- Friedrich Spee von Langenfeld (1591–1635)
- Paul Speratus (1484–1581)
- Josua Stegmann (1588–1632)
- Georg Rodolf Weckherlin (1584–1653)
- Michael Weiße (1588–1634)
- Diederich von dem Werder (1584–1657)
- Christoff Wirsung (c. 1500–1571)
- Julius Wilhelm Zincgref (1591–1635)
- Georgius Agricola (1554–1630)

==== German-language Swiss ====
- Nicholas Manuel (1484–1530)

=== Italy ===
- Benedetto Cariteo (1450–1514)
- Teofilo Folengo (1491 – 1574)
- Lodovico Ariosto (1474–1533), also a Latin poet
- Torquato Tasso (1544–1595)
- Pietro Bembo (1470–1547), Cardinal and influential critic
- Vittoria Colonna (1492–1547)
- Gaspara Stampa (c. 1523–1554), woman poet
- Antonio Sebastiano Minturno (1559–1565), writer and poet

=== Japan ===
- Arakida Moritake 荒木田守武 (1473–1549), the son of Negi Morihide, and a Shinto priest; said to have excelled in waka, renga, and in particular haikai
- Hosokawa Fujitaka 細川藤孝, also known as Hosokawa Yūsai 細川幽斎 (1534–1610), a Sengoku period feudal warlord who was a prominent retainer of the last Ashikaga shōguns; father of Hosokawa Tadaoki, an Oda clan senior general; after the 1582 Incident at Honnō-ji, he took the Buddhist tonsure and changed his name to "Yūsai"; but he remained an active force in politics, under Shōguns Toyotomi Hideyoshi and Tokugawa Ieyasu
- Satomura Shokyu 里村昌休 (1510–1552), Japanese leading master of the linked verse renga after the death of Tani Sobuko in 1545
- Sōgi 宗祇 (1421–1502), Japanese Zen monk who studied waka and renga poetry, then became a professional renga poet in his 30s
- Tani Soyo 谷宗養 (1526–1563), renga poet; a rival of Satomura Joha; son of Tani Sobuko
- Yamazaki Sōkan 山崎宗鑑, pen name of Shina Norishige (1465–1553), renga and haikai poet, court calligrapher for Shōgun Ashikaga Yoshihisa; became a secluded Buddhist monk following the shōgun's death in 1489

=== Latin ===
- Battista Spagnoli (1447–1516), Italian
- Giovanni Pontano (1429–1503), Italian
- Michael Marullus (c. 1453–1500), Italian
- Jacopo Sannazaro (1458–1530), Italian
- Andrea Navagero (1483–1529), Italian
- Girolamo Fracastoro (1483–1553), Italian
- Marcantonio Flaminio (1498–1550), Italian
- Marco Girolamo Vida (1485–1566), Italian
- Conrad Celtis (1459–1508), German
- Salmon Macrin (1490–1557), French
- Joannes Secundus (1511–1536), Dutch
- Lodovico Ariosto (1474–1533), Italian who also published poetry in Italian
- Joachim Du Bellay (c. 1525–1560), Frenchman who also published poetry in French
- Jan Kochanowski (1530–1584), Pole who also published poetry in Polish
- Maciej Kazimierz Sarbiewski (1595–1640), Polish Jesuit and poet
- Jacob Balde (1604–1668), German Jesuit and poet

=== Mexico ===
- Ayocuan Cuetzpaltzin (mid 15th-early 16th centuries) wise man, poet, white eagle from Tecamachalco
- Cacamatzin (1483-1520), tlatoani (ruler or lord) of Texcoco (altepetl) and poet
- Tecayehuatzin of Huexotzinco (second half of 15th to early 16th century), poet and philosopher (Huexotzinco was a semi-independent state, alternately loyal to the Aztec Empire or to Tlaxcala.)
- Temilotzin (end of 15th century-1525), born in Tlatelolco (altepetl) and Tlatoani of Tzilacatlan
- Xicotencatl I (1425-1522) tlatoani of Tizatlan (Tlaxcala)

=== Netherlands ===
- Barlaeus, also known as Kaspar van Baerle (1584–1648)
- Suster Bertken (1426 or 1427–1514)
- Anna Bijns (1493–1575)
- Adriaen Valerius (1570/1575–1625)
- Joost van den Vondel (1587–1679), Dutch writer considered the most prominent Dutch poet and playwright of the 17th century

=== Ottoman Empire ===
- Bâkî (باقى) (1526–1600)
- Fuzûlî (فضولی) (c. 1483–1556)
- Hayâlî (خيالى) (c. 1500–1557)
- Necati (died 1509)
- Selim II (1524–1574), sultan and poet
- Suleyman the Magnificent (ca. 1495–1566)
- Tashcali Yahya Bey (died 1582)
- Ruhi-i Bagdadi (died 1605)
- Nef'i (1582–1635)
- Seyhulislam Yahya (1552–1644)
- Pir Sultan Abdal (c. 1480–1550)

=== Persian language ===
- Sheikh Bahaii, Scientist, architect, philosopher, and poet (1546–1620)
- Vahshi Bafghi

=== Poland ===
- Biernat of Lublin (c. 1465 – after 1529)
- Mikolaj Rej (1505–1569)
- Jan Kochanowski (1530–1584)
- Mikolaj September Szarzynski (c. 1550 – c. 1581)
- Sebastian Grabowiecki (ca. 1543–1607)
- Sebastian Fabian Klonowic (ca. 1545–1602)
- Szymon Szymonowic (1558–1629)
- Daniel Naborowski (1573–1640)
- Kasper Miakskowski (1550–1622)

=== Portugal ===
- Garcia de Resende (c. 1470–1536)
- Gil Vicente (c. 1465 – c. 1536), poet and playwright
- Francisco de Sá de Miranda (c. 1481–1558)
- Bernardim Ribeiro (1482–1552)
- Cristovao Falcao (1518 – c. 1557)
- Luís de Camões (c. 1524–1580)
- Diogo Bernardes (c. 1530 – c. 1605), brother of Frei Agostinho da Cruz
- Frei Agostinho da Cruz (1540–1619), brother of Diogo Bernardes
- Francisco Rodrigues Lobo (c. 1580–1621)
- Antonio de Ferreira
- Mellin de Saint Gelais (1491–1558)

=== Slovakia ===
- Martin Rakovský (1535–1579)
- Ján Silván (1493–1573)
- Pavel Kyrmezer (birth year not known – 1589)
- Vavřinec Benedikt z Nudožer (Laurentio Benedictino Nudozierino) (1555–1615)
- Ján Filický ( c. 1585–1623)
- Ján Bocatius (1569–1621)
- Jakub Jakobeus (1591–1645)
- Martin Bošňák (birth year not known – 1566)
- Štefan Komodický (16th century)
- Eliáš Láni (1570–1618)
- Daniel Pribiš (1580–1645)
- Juraj Tranovský or Tranoscius (1592–1637)

=== South Asia ===
- Akho (1591–1659), Gujarati-language poet, Vedantist and radical
- Bhalam (c. 1426–1500), Gujarati-language poet
- Sant Eknath संत एकनाथ or Eknāth; the epithet "sant" संत is traditionally given to persons regarded as thoroughly saintly (1533–1599), Marathi-language poet and scholar
- Sant Tukaram संत तुकाराम (birth-year estimates range from 1577–-1609 – died 1650), Marathi-language poet
- Krishnadevaraya (died 1529), king of the Vijayanagara Empire and Sanskrit-language poet
- Annamacharya శ్రీ తాళ్ళపాక అన్నమాచార్య (1408–1503), mystic saint composer of the 15th century, widely regarded as the Telugu-language pada kavita pitaamaha (grand old man of simple poetry); husband of Tallapaka Tirumalamma
- Molla, also known as "Mollamamba", both popular names of Atukuri Molla (1440–1530) Telugu-language poet who wrote Telugu Ramayan; a woman
- Potana, born Bammera Pothana (1450–1510), Telugu-language poet best known for his translation of the Bhagavata Purana from Sanskrit; the book is popularly known as Pothana Bhagavatham
- Habba Khatun
- Meerabai (मीराबाई) (1498–1547), alternate spelling: Meera, Mira, Meera Bai; Hindu poet-saint, mystical poet whose compositions, extant version of which are in Gujarati and a Rajasthani dialect of Hindi, remain popular throughout India
- Gosvāmī Tulsīdās तुलसीदास, also known as "Tulasī Dāsa" and "Tulsidas" (1532–1623) Awadhi poet and philosopher

=== Spain ===
- Juan Boscán (c. 1490–1542)
- Garcilaso de la Vega (1503–1536)
- Diego Hurtado de Mendoza (1503–1575)
- Hernando de Acuña (c. 1520–1580)
- Baltasar del Alcázar (1590–1616)
- Francisco de Aldana (1537–1578)
- Gutierre de Cetina (1520 – c. 1557)
- Cristóbal de Castillejo (c. 1490–1550)
- Luis de León (1527–1591)
- San Juan de la Cruz (1542–1591)
- Alonso de Ledesma (1562–1623)
- Lope de Vega (1562–1635), playwright and poet
- Fernando de Herrera (1534–1597)
- Luis Barahona de Soto (1548–1595)
- Pedro de Espinosa (1578–1650)
- Francisco de Rioja (1583–1659)
- Francisco de Medrano (1570–1607)
- Alonso de Ercilla (1533 – c. 1596)

=== Other ===
- Chŏng Ch'ŏl (1536–1593), Korean poet
- Hwang Jin-i (1522–1565), Korean poet
- Song Tŏkpong (1521-1578), Korean poet
- Judah Leone Modena, also known as: Leon Modena or Yehudah Aryeh Mi-modena (1571–1648), a rabbi, orator, scholar, teacher and poet
- Israel ben Moses Najara (c. 1555 – c. 1625), Hebrew poet in Palestine
- Ali-Shir Nava'i, also known as "Nizām al-Din"; pen name "Navā'ī" Persian: نوایی, meaning "the weeper" (1441 – 1501), Central Asian politician, mystic, linguist, painter, and poet of Chaghatai origin who was born and lived in Herat, in modern-day Afghanistan; his Chagatai language (Middle Turkic) poetry has led many throughout the Turkic-speaking world to consider him the founder of early Turkic literature, and the Uzbeks claim him as their national poet

== See also ==
- 16th century in literature
- Castalian Band
- Dutch Renaissance and Golden Age literature
- Elizabethan literature
- English Madrigal School
- French Renaissance literature
- Renaissance literature
- Spanish Renaissance literature
- University Wits

== Decades and years ==
1490s	1490	1491	1492	1493	1494	1495	1496	1497	1498	1499
1500s	1500	1501	1502	1503	1504	1505	1506	1507	1508	1509
1510s	1510	1511	1512	1513	1514	1515	1516	1517	1518	1519
1520s	1520	1521	1522	1523	1524	1525	1526	1527	1528	1529
1530s	1530	1531	1532	1533	1534	1535	1536	1537	1538	1539
1540s	1540	1541	1542	1543	1544	1545	1546	1547	1548	1549
1550s	1550	1551	1552	1553	1554	1555	1556	1557	1558	1559
1560s	1560	1561	1562	1563	1564	1565	1566	1567	1568	1569
1570s	1570	1571	1572	1573	1574	1575	1576	1577	1578	1579
1580s	1580	1581	1582	1583	1584	1585	1586	1587	1588	1589
1590s	1590	1591	1592	1593	1594	1595	1596	1597	1598	1599
1600s	1600	1601	1602	1603	1604	1605	1606	1607	1608	1609
