= 1511 in poetry =

This article covers 1511 in poetry. Nationality words link to articles with information on the nation's poetry or literature (for instance, Irish or France).

== Works published ==
- Anonymous, The Friar and the Boy, publication year uncertain (sometime between 1510–1513); a popular fabliau; Great Britain
- Jean Lemaire de Belges, La Concorde des deux langages, referring to the French and Italian languages, urging cultural unity; Belgian Walloon poet writing in French
- John Lydgate, The Governance of Kings, also known as Secrets of the Old Philisoffres, translated from Aristotle's secreta secretorum; Lydgate's last work (see also Robert Copland's Secreta secretorum 1528); Great Britain
- Cancionero general, anthology of Spanish poetry, published by Hernando del Castillo (revised several times in the 16th century)

== Births ==
Death years link to the corresponding "[year] in poetry" article:

- November 15 – Joannes Secundus (died 1536), Dutch, Latin-language poet

== Deaths ==
Birth years link to the corresponding "[year] in poetry" article:

- Matthias Ringmann (born 1482), German cartographer and humanist poet

== See also ==
- Poetry
- 16th century in poetry
- 16th century in literature
- French Renaissance literature
- Grands Rhétoriqueurs
- Renaissance literature
- Spanish Renaissance literature
