= 1573 in poetry =

This article covers 1573 in poetry. Nationality words link to articles with information on the nation's poetry or literature (for instance, Irish or France).

== Works published ==
- Cristóbal de Castillejo, Works of Castillejo Expurgated by the Inquisition, published posthumously in Madrid, Spain
- Philippe Desportes, Les premières œuvres de Philippe Desportes, which had circulated widely in manuscript form and were largely love poems (in imitation of minor Italian poets), including "Les Amours de Diane", "les Amours d’Hippolyte", "Élégies", France
- Johann Fischart (writing under the pen name "Hultrich Elloposcleron") and another author, The Flea Hunt, a burlesque; a flea complains to Jupiter about the hard treatment it receives from women; Fischart wrote the second part, in which women reply and are defended; Germany
- George Gascoigne, A Hundred Sundry Flowers, Great Britain
- Torquato Tasso, Aminta, pastoral verse drama, Italy
- Pontus de Tyard, Nouvell'Œuvres poétiques, France

== Births ==
- December 21 – Mathurin Régnier (died 1613), French satirical poet, nephew of Philippe Desportes
- Also:
  - Thomas Heywood, born about this year (died 1641), English playwright, actor and miscellaneous author
  - Richard Johnson (died 1659), English romance writer, playwright and poet
  - Daniel Naborowski (died 1640), Polish
  - Martin Peerson born sometime from 1571 to this year (died December 1650 or January 1651), English composer, organist and virginalist writing hymns, madrigals and other sacred and secular music
  - Samuel Rowlands, born about this year (died 1630), English author of pamphlets in prose and verse

== Deaths ==
- February – William Lauder (born 1520), Scottish cleric, playwright and poet
- July – Étienne Jodelle (born 1532), French poet and playwright
- November – Giovanni Battista Giraldi, who gave himself the nickname "Cinthio", also rendered "Cynthius", "Cintio" or, in Italian, "Cinzio" (born 1504), Italian novelist, writer, poet and playwright
- Also:
  - Brne Karnarutić (born 1515), Croatian Renaissance poet and writer
  - Andrea Rapicio (born 1533), Italian, Latin-language poet
  - Ján Silván (born 1493), Slovak

== See also ==
- Poetry
- 16th century in poetry
- 16th century in literature
- Dutch Renaissance and Golden Age literature
- Elizabethan literature
- French Renaissance literature
- Renaissance literature
- Spanish Renaissance literature
