= Uziel =

Uziel or Uzziel (עֻזִּיאֵל, עוזיאל) is documented as a Jewish family name in early 15th century Spain.

Notable people with this surname include:

- Ben-Zion Meir Hai Uziel
- Isaac Uziel
- Jacob Uziel
- Joseph Uziel
- Judah Uziel
- Oren Uziel
- Samuel Uziel
- Yonatan Uziel
- David Uziel

== See also ==
- (the father of) Jonathan ben Uzziel
- Hayyim ben Abraham Uziel
- Samuel ben Joseph Uziel
- Uziel Gal, designer of the Uzi submachine gun
- Uzi
- Uziel (angel)
