= 1583 in poetry =

Nationality words link to articles with information on the nation's poetry or literature (for instance, Irish or France).

== Events ==
- Sir Philip Sidney is knighted
- William Shakespeare's first daughter Susanna is born

== Works published ==
=== France ===
- Jean de Sponde, a Latin translation of Homer, with commentaries
- Philippe Desportes, Dernièrs Amours, which increased the author's fame; France
- Catherine Des Roches, also known as "Catherine Fradonnet", and her mother, Madeleine Des Roches, France:
  - La Puce de Madame Des Roches (collection of verse)
  - Secondes Oeuvres, Poitiers: Nicolas Courtoys

=== Great Britain ===
- Robert Greene, Mamillia (Part 2 published in 1593 Mamillia: The triumph of Pallas
- William Hunnis, Seven Sobs of a Sorrowful Soul
- Richard Robinson, The Auncient Order, Societie, and Unitie Laudable, of Prince Arthure, and his Knightly Armory of the Round Table, translated from the French of La devise des armes des Chevaliers de la Table Ronde, a treatise on heraldry published in Paris in 1546; adapted by the author to advertise a popular society of archers, Prince Arthur and the London Round Table; Edmund Spenser's schoolmaster, Richard Mulcaster, was a member

== Births ==
- March 3 – Edward Herbert (died 1648), Anglo-Welsh soldier, diplomat, historian, poet and religious philosopher
- November 24 – Juan Martínez de Jáuregui y Aguilar (died 1641), Spanish poet, scholar and painter
- Robert Aylett (died 1655), English lawyer and religious poet
- William Basse (died 1653/1654), English
- John Beaumont (died 1627), poet
- Hugo Grotius (died 1645), Dutch jurist, philosopher, theologian, Christian apologist, playwright, and poet
- Ishikawa Jozan 石川丈山 (died 1672), Japanese poet and intellectual
- Francisco de Rioja (died 1659), Spanish
- Aurelian Townshend born about this year (died c. 1643), English poet and playwright

== Deaths ==
- January 1 – François de Belleforest (born 1530), French poet and translator
- date unknown – Alexander Arbuthnot (born 1538), Scottish poet
- date unknown – Pey de Garros (born 1525), French

== See also ==
- Poetry
- 16th century in poetry
- 16th century in literature
- Dutch Renaissance and Golden Age literature
- Elizabethan literature
- French Renaissance literature
- Renaissance literature
- Spanish Renaissance literature
- University Wits
