= 1503 in poetry =

Nationality words link to articles with information on the nation's poetry or literature (for instance, Irish or France).

== Events ==
- Italian poet Ludovico Ariosto begins writing Orlando Furioso (earliest version published in 1516; first complete version published 1532)

== Works published ==
- Anonymous, Sir Tryamour, publication year uncertain; written in the late 14th century
- William Dunbar, The Thrissil and the Rois, Scotland, a political allegory honoring Margaret Tudor, whose marriage to James IV of Scotland had been negotiated with the help of Dunbar
- Jean Lemaire de Belges, La Plainte du Désiré, Belgian Walloon poet living in and published in France

== Births ==
Death years link to the corresponding "[year] in poetry" article:

- June 28 – Giovanni della Casa (died 1556), Italian poet and critic; Latin-language poet
- November 17 – Agnolo di Cosimo, better known as "Il Bronzino" or "Agnolo Bronzino" (died 1572), Italian Mannerist painter and poet
- Nicholas Bourbon in this year or 1505 (died 1550), French court preceptor and poet
- Diego Hurtado de Mendoza (died 1575), Spanish
- Benedetto Varchi, some sources say he may have been born this year, others say his birth year is either this year or 1502 (died 1565), Italian, Latin-language poet
- Garcilasco de la Vega (died 1536), Spanish
- Thomas Wyatt, born about this year (died 1542), English lyric poet and diplomat

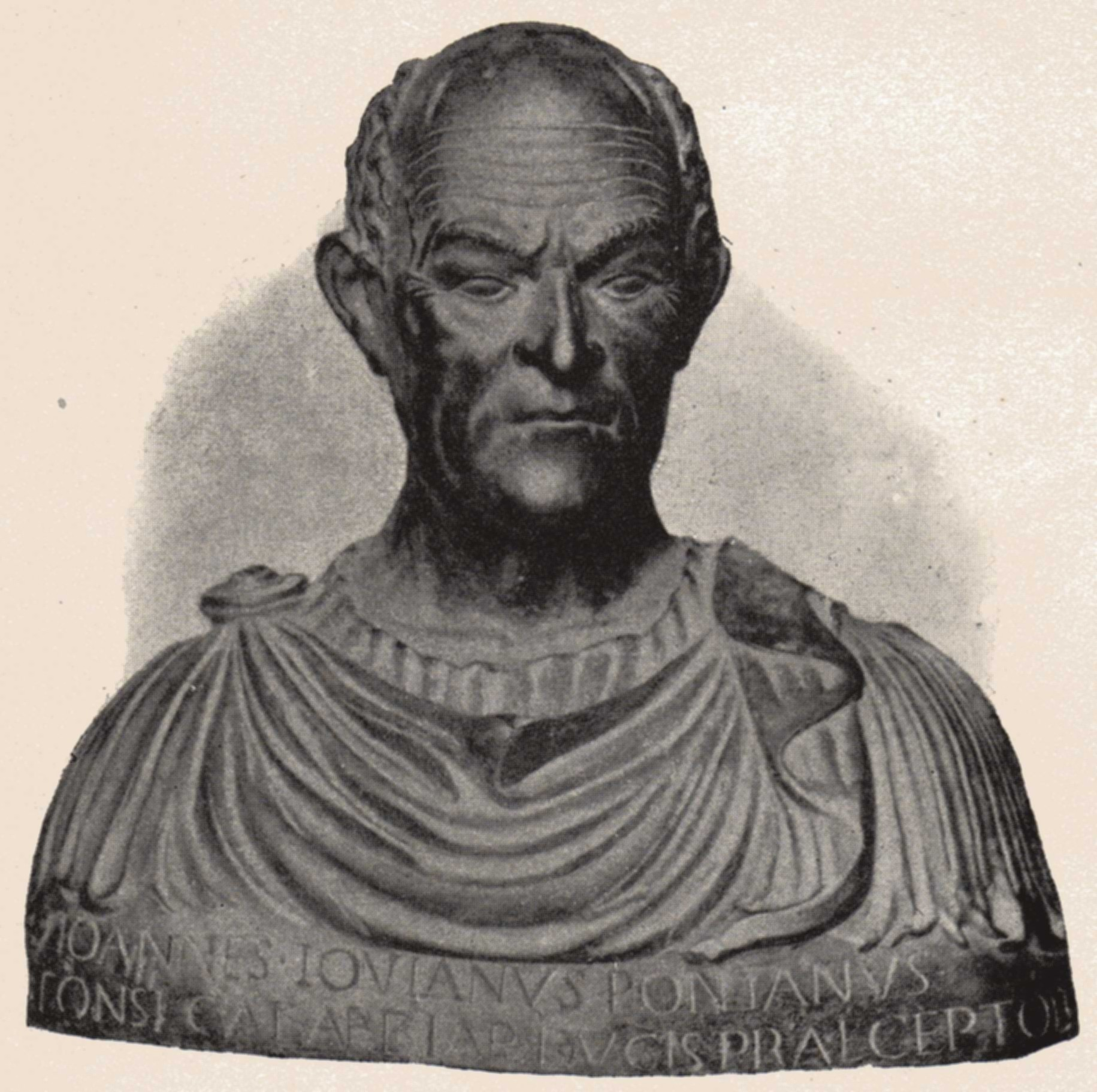
Giovanni Pontano, also known as "Iovanus Pontanus"

== Deaths ==
Birth years link to the corresponding "[year] in poetry" article:

- Antonio Bonfini (born 1434), Italian humanist and poet
- Alessandro Braccesi (born 1445), Italian, Latin-language poet
- Matteo Canale (born 1443), Italian, Latin-language poet
- Gian Giacomo della Croce died this year or later (born c. 1450), Italian, Latin-language poet
- Iovianus Pontanus, also known as Giovanni Gioviano Pontano, (born 1426), Italian, Latin-language poet
- Annamacharya శ్రీ తాళ్ళపాక అన్నమాచార్య (born 1408), mystic saint composer of the 15th century, widely regarded as the Telugu pada kavita pitaamaha (grand old man of simple poetry); husband of Tallapaka Tirumalamma

== See also ==
- Poetry
- 16th century in poetry
- 16th century in literature
- French Renaissance literature
- Grands Rhétoriqueurs
- Renaissance literature
- Spanish Renaissance literature
