= 1578 in poetry =

This article covers 1578 in poetry. Nationality words link to articles with information on the nation's poetry or literature (for instance, Irish or French).

== Works published ==
=== Great Britain ===
- Thomas Blenerhasset, The Seconde Part of the Mirrour for Magistrates (see A Myrroure for Magistrates (Mirror for Magistrates) 1559)
- Thomas Proctor, editor, A Gorgious Gallery, of Gallant Inventions, including contributions by Proctor, Owen Raydon, Thomas Churchyard, Thomas Howell, Clement Robinson and Jasper Heywood
- Thomas Churchyard, A lamentable and pitifull Description of the wofull warres in Flanders, including two poems (see also his The Miserie of Flaunders, Calamite of Fraunce, Misfortune of Portugall, Unquietnes of Ireland, Troubles of Scotlande: and the Blessed State of Englande 1579)
- John Rolland, The Sevyn Sages, Scotland

=== France ===
- Rémy Belleau, Oeuvres complètes, an edition of his collected works, containing the verse comedy La Reconnue (composed about 1563), published posthumously (died 1577)
- Guillaume Belliard, Le premier livre des Poèmes Paris: Claude Gauthier
- Antoine de Cotel, Premier Livre des mignardes et gaies poésies
- Philippe Desportes, an edition of his works; France
- Catherine Des Roches, also known as "Catherine Fradonnet", Oeuvres, Paris: Abel L'Angelier published this year and in 1579, France
- Esbatement moral des animaux, a version of Aesop's Fables, illustrated by Marcus Gheeraerts the Elder
- Jean de Boyssières, Les Premières Œuvres
- Guillaume de Salluste Du Bartas, Première semaine ou création du monde, a biblical and scientific epic poem which established the author's fame as a poet, attempted to inventory human knowledge in an encyclopedic way and in a didactic and religious framework; translated into several languages and reprinted in 25 editions over the next 25 years; inspired or admired by d'Aubigne, Tasso, John Milton and, later, Johann Goethe; Paris: Gadoulleau et Febvrier.
- Pierre de Ronsard:
  - Les Amours d’Hélène
  - Oeuvres, the fifth, revised edition of his collected works (the first was published in 1560). New poems in this edition include Sur la Mort de Marie, the sonnets for Astrée and the Sonnets pour Hélène.

=== Other ===
- Alonso de Ercilla, La Araucana, an epic poem about the conquest of Chile; the first part originally appeared in 1569, the second part was published for the first time this year (together with the first part), the third part was published with the first and second parts in 1589; Spain
- Jan Kochanowski, Poland:
  - Psalterz Dawidów ("David's Psalter"), a free paraphrasing of the Psalms
  - Odprawa postów greckich ("The Dismissal of the Grecian Envoys")

== Births ==
- Between December 1578 and February 1579 – Natshinnaung (executed 1613), Toungoo prince, poet and musician
- March 2 – George Sandys (died 1644), English traveller, colonist and poet, seventh and youngest son of Church of England Archbishop Edwin Sandys
- August 24 – John Taylor "The Water Poet" (died 1653), English
- Also:
  - Pedro de Espinosa born (died 1650), Spanish
  - Henry Peacham the Younger (died 1643), English poet and writer

== Deaths ==
- Date not known – Francisco de Aldana died (born 1537), Spanish
- Date not known – Thomas Drant died about this year (birth year unknown), English poet and translator
- Date not known – Song Tŏkpong (born 1521), Korean poet

== See also ==
- Poetry
- 16th century in poetry
- 16th century in literature
- Dutch Renaissance and Golden Age literature
- Elizabethan literature
- French Renaissance literature
- Renaissance literature
- Spanish Renaissance literature
