= 1607 in poetry =

This article covers 1607 in poetry. Nationality words link to articles with information on the nation's poetry or literature (for instance, Irish or France).

== Works ==
- Samuel Daniel, Certaine Small Workes, the fourth collected edition of his works
- John Davies, Yehovah Summa Totalis; or, All in All, and, the Same for Ever; or, An Addition to Mirum in Modum
- Michael Drayton, The Legend of Great Cromwel
- Thomas Ford, Musicke of sundrie kindes
- Sir John Harington, translator (from the Latin of Johannes de Mediolano's Regimen sanitatis Salernitanum), The Englishmans Doctor; or, The Schole of Salerne
- Robert Jones, The First Set of Madrigals (verse and music)
- Gervase Markham, Rodomonths Infernall; or, The Divell Conquered, translated from Philippe Desportes' French translation of Ariosto's Orlando Furioso
- Samuel Rowlands:
  - Democritus; or, Doctor Merry-man his Medicines, Against Melancholy Humors
  - Diogines Lanthorne

== Births ==
- March 12 – Paul Gerhardt (died 1676), German hymn writer
- March 8 – Johann von Rist (died 1667), German
- April 13 (bapt.) – Robert Chamberlain (died 1660), English poet and dramatist
- November 1 – Georg Philipp Harsdorffer (died 1658), German poet and translator
- November 5 – Anna Maria van Schurman (died 1678), Dutch
- date unknown
  - Alaol (died 1673), Bengali
  - Václav František Kocmánek (died 1679), Czech poet, author and historian
  - 1607/1608: Salabega (died unknown), Oriyan religious poet

== Deaths ==
- May – Sir Edward Dyer (born 1543), English courtier and poet
- c. May – Thomas Newton (born c. 1542), English physician, poet and translator
- June – Thomas Newton (born c. 1542), English physician, clergyman, poet, author and translator
- July 7 – Penelope Rich, Lady Rich (born 1563), English noblewoman, inspiration for Sir Philip Sidney's "Stella"
- September 18 – Abraham Fleming (born c. 1552), English poet, translator and antiquarian
- Also:
  - Henry Chettle, death year uncertain (born c. 1560), English playwright, writer and poet
  - Dinko Ranjina (born 1536), Croatian
