= 1565 in poetry =

Nationality words link to articles with information on the nation's poetry or literature (for instance, Irish or France).

== Events ==
- Torquato Tasso enters the service of Cardinal Luigi d'Este at Ferrara.

== Works published ==
=== England ===
- Robert Copland, The Seven Sorrows That Women Have When Theyr Husbandes Be Deade, publication year uncertain
- Arthur Golding, translated from the Latin of Ovid (Books 1–4), Metamorphoses (see also Metamorphosis [Books 1–15])
- Barnabe Googe, translation (from Marcello Palingenio Stellato's Zodiacus vitae [c. 1528]), The Zodiac of Life (see also editions of 1560, 1561)

=== France ===
- Rémy Belleau, Bergerie, mix of prose and verse, including Avril; revised and expanded 1572; France
- Pierre de Ronsard:
  - Abrégé de l'art poétique français, a handbook intended for beginners in poetry; French criticism
  - Élegies, Mascarades, et Bergerie

=== Other ===
- Jan Kochanowski, Chess ("Szachy"), published either this year or in 1564; Polish

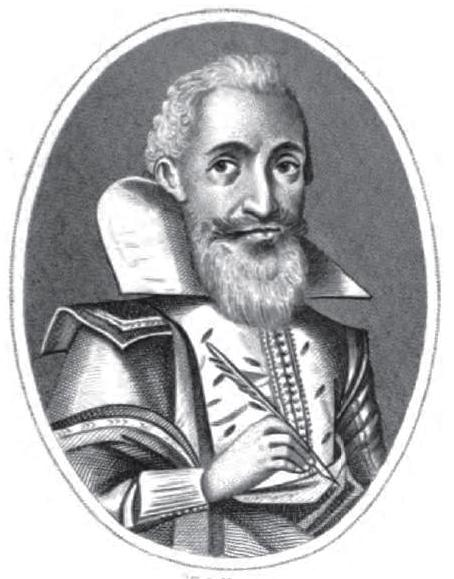
John Davies of Hereford, born this year

== Births ==
Death years link to the corresponding "[year] in poetry" article:

- September 28 – Alessandro Tassoni (died 1635), Italian
- Also:
  - Cheng Jiasui (died 1643), Chinese landscape painter and poet
  - John Davies of Hereford, birth year uncertain (died 1618), English
  - Francis Meres (died 1647), English churchman, author, critic and poet
  - Konoe Nobutada (died 1614), Japanese courtier and man of letters known as a poet, calligrapher, painter and diarist
  - Andrzej Zbylitowski (died 1608), Polish poet

== Deaths ==
Birth years link to the corresponding "[year] in poetry" article:

- October 14 - Sir Thomas Chaloner the elder (born 1521), English
- December 13 - Konrad Gesner (born 1516), German
- Benedetto Varchi, (born 1502 or 1503), Italian, Latin-language poet
- Approximate date - Hwang Jini (born 1522), Korean kisaeng

== See also ==
- Poetry
- 16th century in poetry
- 16th century in literature
- Dutch Renaissance and Golden Age literature
- Elizabethan literature
- French Renaissance literature
- Renaissance literature
- Spanish Renaissance literature
