= 1587 in poetry =

Nationality words link to articles with information on the nation's poetry or literature (for instance, Irish or France).

== Events ==
- Jean-Antoine de Baif awarded the Golden Apollo by the Jeux Floraux de Toulouse, in France
- French King Henri of Navarre sends Guillaume Du Bartas on a diplomatic mission to Scotland and England.

== Works published ==
=== Great Britain ===
- Thomas Churchyard, The Worthiness of Wales, mostly verse
- Angel Day, Daphnis and Chloe, prose and poetry; a translation from the French of Jacques Amyot
- George Gascoigne, The Whole Woorkes of George Gascoigne Esquyre, posthumously published (see also A Hundreth Sundrie Flowres 1573, The Posies of George Gascoigne 1575)
- George Turberville, Tragicall Tales, translations from Mambrino Roseo and Boccaccio's Decameron
- George Whetstone, Sir Philip Sidney, his Honourable Life, his Valiant Death, and his True Vertues, in verse (see "Deaths" section)

=== Other ===
- François de Malherbe, Les Larmes de Saint Pierre, presented to Henry III of France, a florid, mannered poem which the author later disowned, France
- Cristóbal de Virués, El Monserrate, Spain
- Jean Papire Masson, a book on the lives of Dante, Petrarch and Boccaccio, published in Paris, France

== Births ==
Death years link to the corresponding "[year] in poetry" article:

- September 18 – Francesca Caccini (died 1641), Italian early Baroque composer, singer, lutenist, poet and music teacher
- October 18 – Lady Mary Wroth (died c. 1651), English poet
- November 17 – Joost van den Vondel (died 1679), Dutch writer considered the most prominent Dutch poet and playwright of the 17th century
- Also:
  - Francis Kynaston (died 1642), English courtier, poet and translator
  - Yun Sŏndo (died 1671), Korean poet and government official

== Deaths ==
Birth years link to the corresponding "[year] in poetry" article:

- February 8 – Mary, Queen of Scots (born 1542), deposed queen regnant and occasional French-language poet, executed
- November – Madeleine Des Roches (born c. 1520) and her daughter, Catherine Des Roches (born 1542), both died of an epidemic on the same day; together they collectively published French prose and poetry; the two hosted a literary circle which included Scévole de Sainte-Marthe, Barnabé Brisson, René Chopin, Antoine Loisel, Claude Binet, Nicolas Rapin and Odet de Turnèbe
- date not known – George Whetstone died about this year (born c. 1544), English playwright, poet and author (see "Works published" section)

== See also ==
- Poetry
- 16th century in poetry
- 16th century in literature
- Dutch Renaissance and Golden Age literature
- Elizabethan literature
- French Renaissance literature
- Renaissance literature
- Spanish Renaissance literature
- University Wits
