= 1555 in poetry =

This article covers 1555 in poetry. Nationality words link to articles with information on the nation's poetry or literature (for instance, Irish or France).

== Works published ==
=== France ===
- Joachim du Bellay, Les Regrets, France
- Jean Antoine de Baïf, Amour de Francine
- Louise Labé, Œuvres complètes ("Complete Works"), including her prose "Débat de Folie et d'Amour", three elegies and 24 sonnets (one in Italian), as well as 24 poems in her honor by others; published by the noted Lyon printer, Jean de Tournes; the first edition ran through two printings; reprinted again in 1556, with spelling corrections; her sonnets have been often republished and translated
- Jacques Peletier du Mans, L'Art poetique ("The Art of Poetry"), French criticism
- Pierre de Ronsard:
  - Les Hymnes, addresses and panegyrics
  - Les Amours de Marie
  - La Continuation des Amours
  - Mélanges
- Pontus de Tyard, Livre des vers lyriques
- Jean Vauquelin de la Fresnaye, Foresteries

=== Great Britain ===
- John Heywood, Two Hundred Epigrammes (see also An Hundred Epigrammes 1550; A Fourth Hundred of Epigygrams 1560, Works 1562
- Mirror for Magistrates, anthology of poems about great historical figures of England, first edition; published by John Weyland, who was apparently denied a license to publish by the Lord Chancellor Stephen Gardiner, effectively suppressing the work and putting Weyland out of business (the book was revived and published in 1559, third edition 1563, fourth edition 1574, another edition 1610)
- Henry Lovel, eighth Baron Morley, The Truyumphes of Fraunces Petrarke, publication year uncertain; translated from the Italian of Petrarch's Trionfi

=== Other ===
- Girolamo Fracastoro, also known as "Fracastorius", Collected Works, including poems and Naugerius, criticism

== Births ==
Death years link to the corresponding "[year] in poetry" article:

- Heinrich Meibom (died 1625), German historian and poet
- Keshavdas (died 1617), Sanskrit scholar and Hindi poet
- François de Malherbe born (died 1628), French
- Israel ben Moses Najara born about this year (died c. 1625), Hebrew poet in Palestine
- Vavřinec Benedikt z Nudožer, also known as Laurentio Benedictino Nudozierino (died 1615), Slovak
- Gabriel Lobo Lasso de la Vega (died 1615), Castilian Spanish poet, playwright and historian
- Thomas Watson (died 1592), English lyrical poet who wrote in English and Latin

== Deaths ==
Birth years link to the corresponding "[year] in poetry" article:

- Sir David Lindsay (born 1490), Scottish

== See also ==
- Poetry
- 16th century in poetry
