= 1552 in poetry =

This article covers 1552 in poetry.

== Works ==
=== French ===
- Jean Antoine de Baïf, Les Amours de Méline
- Joachim du Bellay, XIII Sonnets de l'honnête amour, influenced by Pontus de Tyard
- Nostradamus, Centuries, a book of prophecies presented in rhymes
- Pierre de Ronsard, France:
  - Fifth Book of Odes (see also first four books 1550)
  - Les Amours de P. de Ronsard Vandomoys, Ensemble de Bocages, sonnets
  - Oeuvres de l'invention de l'Auteur

=== Other ===
- Thomas Churchyard, A Myrrour for Man
- Nostradamus, also known as Michel de Notredame or Michel de Nostredame, Centuries, a book of rhymed prophecies

== Births ==
- January 22 – Walter Ralegh, born 1554 according to some sources (executed 1618), English soldier, politician, courtier, explorer, poet, historian and spy
- February 8 – Agrippa d'Aubigné (died 1630), French poet, soldier, propagandist and chronicler
- Also:
  - Jean Bertaut (died 1611), French
  - Abraham Fleming (died 1607), poet, translator and antiquarian
  - Alonso de Ledesma, born this year, according to many sources, or 1562, according to many others (died 1623), Spanish
  - Edmund Spenser, born about this year (died 1599), English
  - Seyhulislam Yahya (died 1644), Ottoman Empire
  - Cvijeta Zuzorić (died 1648), Ragusan

== Deaths ==
- Bernardim Ribeiro (born 1482), Portuguese
- Satomura Shokyu 里村昌休 (born 1510), Japanese leading master of the linked verse renga after the death of Tani Sobuko in 1545
- Alexander Barclay (born 1476), English/Scottish poet
- Giglio Gregorio Giraldi (born 1479), Italian scholar and poet

== See also ==
- Poetry
- 16th century in poetry
- 16th century in literature
- Dutch Renaissance and Golden Age literature
- French Renaissance literature
- Renaissance literature
- Spanish Renaissance literature
