= 1521 in poetry =

This article covers 1521 in poetry. Nationality words link to articles with information on the nation's poetry or literature (for instance, Irish or France).

Her lothly lere [unwanted complexion]

Is nothing clear,
But ugly of cheer,
Droopy and drowsy,
Scurvy and lousy;
Her face all bowsy [bloated by drink]
Comely crinkled,
Wondersly wrinkled,
Like a roast pig's ear,
Bristled with hear. [hair]

-- Lines 12-21, "The Tunnyng of Elynour Rummyng" by John Skelton. The poem is thought to have been first published this year.

== Works published ==
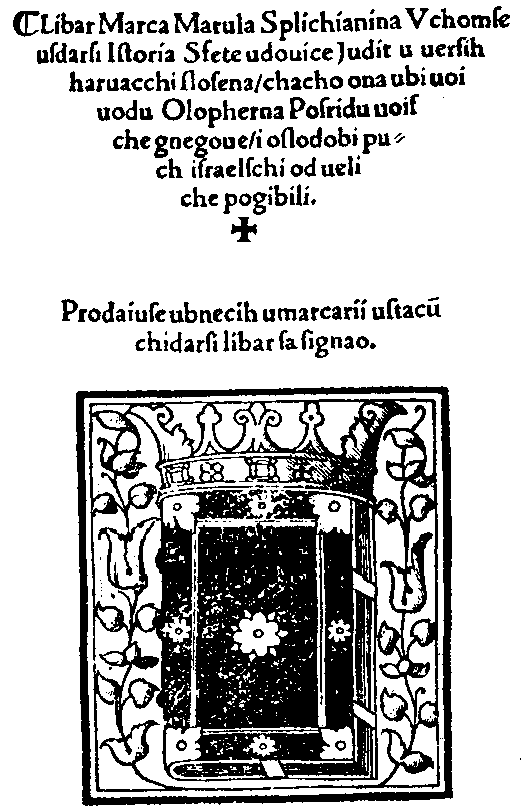
Cover of the first edition of Marko Marulić's Judita

- Anonymous, A boke of a Ghoostly fader ("A Book of a Ghostly Father"), London: Wynkyn de Worde 1520 has also been suggested as the most likely year of publication)
- Anonymous, Christmas Carols, including "A caroll of huntynge" and "A carol bringyng in the bores heed"
- Alexander Barclay, The Boke of Codrus and Mynalcas, the author's "Fourth Eclog" (see also Eclogues 1530, Fifth Eclogue 1518)
- Henry Bradshaw, The Life of St. Werburgh
- Andrew Chertsey, The Passyon of Oure Lorde, translated from French with additional verses interspersed in the text
- Robert Copland, English:
  - Introductory poem to The Passyon of Our Lorde, London: Wynkyn de Worde
  - Introductory verse to The Myrrour & the Chyrche, London: Wynkyn de Worde
- Marko Marulić, Judita ("Judith"), Croatian poem, a landmark in Croatian literature, printed in Venice by Guglielmo da Fontaneto on August 13, and published three times during the author's life (written in 1501)
- John Skelton, "The Tunnyng of Elynour Rummyng", publication year uncertain (reprinted in Skelton's Certain Books 1545)

== Births ==
Death years link to the corresponding "[year] in poetry" article:

- Anne Askew born about this year, also spelled "Anne Ayscough" (died 1546), English poet and Protestant martyr who was persecuted as a heretic; the only woman on record to have been tortured in the Tower of London, before being burnt at the stake
- Sir Thomas Chaloner the elder (died 1565), English
- Jorge de Montemayor, year uncertain (died 1561), Portuguese novelist and poet, who wrote almost exclusively in Spanish
- Pontus de Tyard born about this year (died 1605), French, poet and priest, a member of "La Pléiade"
- Song Tŏkpong (died 1578), Korean poet
- Xu Wei (died 1593), Chinese painter, poet and dramatist

== Deaths ==
Birth years link to the corresponding "[year] in poetry" article:

- May 10 – Sebastian Brant (born c.1457), German

== See also ==
- Poetry
- 16th century in poetry
- 16th century in literature
- French Renaissance literature
- Renaissance literature
- Spanish Renaissance literature
