= 1585 in poetry =

Nationality words link to articles with information on the nation's poetry or literature (for instance, Irish or France).

== Events ==
- Irish poet Tuileagna Ó Maoil Chonaire composes the poem Labhram ar iongnaibh Éireann.
- On the death of Pierre de Ronsard, Philippe Desportes became "recognized indisputably as France's greatest living poet," according to 20th century scholar Bernard Weinberg.
- At the order of the Inquisition, a collection of verses ("canczuni") in Italian and Maltese published by Maltese Dominican friar Pasquale Vassallo in 1584 is burned for its allegedly 'obscene' content.

== Works published ==
- Giordano Bruno, Italy:
  - L’Infini de l’univers et les mondes
  - De gli eroici furori ("The Heroic Enthusiasts"), a sonnet sequence and commentaries concerning the philosophy of love and love as a means of mystical ascent; dedicated to Sir Philip Sidney
  - Cabala del Cavallo pegaseo

== Births ==
- January 31 – Daniel Schwenter (died 1636), German Orientalist, polymath, poet and librarian
- March 16 – Gerbrand Bredero (died 1618), Dutch poet and playwright
- October 11 – Johann Heermann (died 1647), German poet and hymn writer
- November 1 – Jan Brożek (died 1652), Polish mathematician, astronomer, physician, poet, writer, musician and rector
- December 13 – William Drummond of Hawthornden (died 1649), Scottish poet
- Also:
  - Elizabeth Cary, Viscountess Falkland, née Elizabeth Tanfield (died 1639), English poet, translator and dramatist
  - Ján Filický born about this year (died 1623), Slovak poet
  - Fang Weiyi (died 1668), Chinese woman poet

== Deaths ==
- Paolo Giovio, birth year not known, Italian, Latin-language poet
- Ambrosius Lobwasser died (born 1515), German
- December 27 – Pierre de Ronsard (born 1524), French

== See also ==
- Poetry
- 16th century in poetry
- 16th century in literature
- Dutch Renaissance and Golden Age literature
- Elizabethan literature
- French Renaissance literature
- Renaissance literature
- Spanish Renaissance literature
- University Wits
