= 1520 in poetry =

This article covers 1520 in poetry. Nationality words link to articles with information on the nation's poetry or literature (for instance, Irish or France).

== Works published ==
=== Great Britain ===
- Anonymous, publication year conjectural, Alexander the Great
- Anonymous, A boke of a Ghoostly fader ("A Book of a Ghostly Father"), London: Wynkyn de Worde; (1521 has also been suggested as the most likely year of publication)
- John Constable, Epigrammata
- Robert Copland, L'enuoy of Robert Coplande, London: Wynkyn de Worde
- Anonymous, publication year conjectural, The Squire of Low Degree, also known as Undo Your Dore, written about 1500
- Anonymous, Terens in Englysh, a translation of Terence, Paris
- Christopher Goodwyn, A Lytell Prosses, London: Wynkyn de Worde
- William Hendred, publication year conjectural, The Pilgrimage of Mankind
- John Lydgate, publication year conjectural, Testament
- William Walter (poet), The Spectacle of Louers, London: Wynkyn de Worde

=== Other ===
- Ulrich von Hutten, Aufwecker der teutschen Nation, a satiric poem, the author's earliest work in German

== Births ==
Death years link to the corresponding "[year] in poetry" article:

- Hernando de Acuña born about this year (died 1580), Spanish
- Giovanni Bona de Boliris (died 1572), Humanist, poet and writer, who wrote in Latin and Italian
- Thomas Churchyard, birth year uncertain (died 1604), English author and poet
- Natalis Comes (died 1582), Italian mythographer, poet and historian
- Pernette Du Guillet (died 1545), French
- William Lauder, year uncertain (died 1573), Scottish cleric, playwright, and poet
- Madeleine Des Roches born about this year (died 1587), French author and poet who published works jointly with her daughter, Catherine Des Roches; the two also hosted a literary salon which included Scévole de Sainte-Marthe, Barnabé Brisson, René Chopin, Antoine Loisel, Claude Binet, Nicolas Rapin and Odet de Turnèbe
- Alexander Scott (died 1582/1583), Scottish
- Georg Thym born about this year (died 1560), German teacher, poet and writer

== Deaths ==
Birth years link to the corresponding "[year] in poetry" article:

- William Dunbar, death year uncertain (born c. 1460), Scottish
- William Hendred (born 1470), English

== See also ==
- Poetry
- 16th century in poetry
- 16th century in literature
- Dutch Renaissance and Golden Age literature
- French Renaissance literature
- Grands Rhétoriqueurs
- Renaissance literature
- Spanish Renaissance literature
