= 1536 in poetry =

Nationality words link to articles with information on the nation's poetry or literature (for instance, Irish or France).

== Works ==
- Bernardino Daniello, La poetica, criticism
- Anonymous, Jack Upland, publication year uncertain; misattributed to Geoffrey Chaucer
- Robert Copland, The Hye Way to the Spyttell Hous, translation from the French of Robert de Balsac's, Le chemin de l'ospital, this poem is part of the "vagabond" literature of this period; the hospital referred to is St. Bartholomew's Hospital in London
- Lancelot de Carle, Épistre Contenant le Procès Criminel Faict à l'Encontre de la Royne Anne Boullant d'Angleterre (A Letter Containing the Criminal Charges Laid Against Queen Anne Boleyn of England), published 1545
- Clément Marot, Psaumes, translation of the Psalms from the Bible into French
- Aonio Paleario, De immortalitate animarum

== Births ==
Death years link to the corresponding "[year] in poetry" article:

- Chŏng Ch'ŏl, who wrote under the pen names "Kyeham" and "Songgang" (died 1593), Korean statesman and poet
- Thomas Sackville, 1st Earl of Dorset (died 1608), English statesman and poet
- Jean Vauquelin de la Fresnaye, 1606, French
- Dinko Ranjina (died 1607), Croatian
- Scévole de Sainte-Marthe (died 1623), French poet

== Deaths ==
Birth years link to the corresponding "[year] in poetry" article:

- March 1 – Bernardo Accolti (born 1465), Italian
- October 14 – Garcilaso de la Vega (born 1501) Spanish soldier and poet
- Also:
  - Giannantonio Flaminio (born 1464), Italian, Latin-language poet
  - Cecilia Gallerani (born 1473), Italian, Latin-language poet, a mistress of Ludovico Sforza
  - Garcia de Resende (born c. 1470), Portuguese
  - Johannes Secundus (born 1511), Dutch or German, Latin-language poet
  - Gil Vicente, died about this year (born c. 1465), Portuguese poet and playwright

== See also ==
- Poetry
- 16th century in poetry
- 16th century in literature
- Dutch Renaissance and Golden Age literature
- French Renaissance literature
- Renaissance literature
- Spanish Renaissance literature
