= 1592 in poetry =

This article covers 1592 in poetry. Nationality words link to articles with information on the nation's poetry or literature (for instance, Irish or France).

== Works published ==
=== Great Britain ===
- Nicholas Breton, The Pilgrimage to Paradise
- Thomas Churchyard, A Handful of Gladsome Verses: Given to the Queenes Majesty at Woodstocke
- Henry Constable, Diana, sonnets (see also Diana 1594)
- Samuel Daniel, Delia, sonnets; dedicated to the Countess of Pembroke (see also Delia and Rosamond Augmented 1594)
- Gabriel Harvey, Three Letters, and Certaine Sonnets: Especially touching Robert Greene, and other parties, by him abused, poetry and prose; also published this year, the related Foure Letters and Certain Sonnets (see also Three Proper, and Whittie, Familiar Letters 1580)
- Richard Johnson, The Nine Worthies of London, poetry and prose
- Edmund Spenser, Daphnaïda. An Elegy upon the death of the noble and vertuous Douglas Howard, Daughter and heire of Henry Lord Howard, Viscount Byndon, and wife of Arthure Gorges Esquier (although one source states the work was first published in London in January of this year, another states the book was published in 1591)
- William Warner, Albions England: The Third Time Corrected and Augmented, third edition, with 9 books (see also Albions England 1586, second edition 1589, fourth edition 1596, fifth edition 1602, A Continuance of Albions England 1606)

=== Other ===
- Jean de Sponde, a Latin translation of Hesiod, with commentaries; France

== Births ==
Death years link to the corresponding "[year] in poetry" article:

- January 16 (bapt.) – Henry King (died 1669), English poet and bishop
- March – Pedro Bucaneg (died 1630), blind Filipino poet, called the "Father of Ilokano literature"
- April 9 – Juraj Tranovský, also known as "George" (instead of Juraj) or (Latinized version) "Tranoscius" (died 1637), Czech and Slovak hymnwriter, sometimes called the father of Slovak hymnody and the "Luther of the Slavs"
- May 8 – Francis Quarles (died 1644), English
- August 1 – François le Métel de Boisrobert (died 1662), French
- December 7 – Ingen (died 1673), Chinese Linji Chan Buddhist monk, poet, and calligrapher
- Also:
  - Wang Duo (died 1652), Chinese calligrapher, painter and poet
  - Arnauld de Oihenart (died 1668), Basque historian and poet
  - Emanuele Tesauro (died 1675), Italian rhetorician, dramatist, Marinist poet and historian

== Deaths ==
Birth years link to the corresponding "[year] in poetry" article:

- February 10 – Patrick Adamson (born 1537), Scottish divine, archbishop of St Andrews, diplomat and Latin-language poet
- September 3 – Robert Greene (born 1558), English author best remembered for a posthumously-published pamphlet containing a polemic attack on William Shakespeare
- September 26 (bur.) – Thomas Watson (born 1555), English lyrical poet

== See also ==
- Poetry
- 16th century in poetry
- 16th century in literature
- Dutch Renaissance and Golden Age literature
- Elizabethan literature
- English Madrigal School
- French Renaissance literature
- Renaissance literature
- Spanish Renaissance literature
- University Wits
