= 1630 in poetry =

This article covers 1630 in poetry. Nationality words link to articles with information on the nation's poetry or literature (for instance, Irish or France).

== Works published ==
=== Great Britain ===
- William Davenant, Ieffereidos
- John Donne, A Help to Memory and Discourse, including The Broken Heart and part of "Song" ("Go and catch a falling star ...")
- Michael Drayton, The Muses Elizium
- Thomas May, A Continuation of Lucan's Historicall Poem Till the Death of Julius Caesar (see also Lucan's Pharsalia 1626, 1627)
- Diana Primrose, A Chaine of Pearle; or a memoriall of the peerless graces, and heroick vertues of Queene Elizabeth
- Francis Quarles, Divine Poems
- Thomas Randolph, Aristippus; or, The Joviall Philosopher, published anonymously
- Nathanael Richards, The Celestiall Publican
- Alexander Ross, Three Decads of Divine Meditations
- John Taylor, All the Workes of John Taylor the Water-Poet

=== Other ===
- José Pellicer de Salas y Tovar, Complete Readings of the Works by Luis de Góngora y Argote, criticism; Spain

== Births ==
Death years link to the corresponding "[year] in poetry" article:

- January 17 – Sultan Bahu (died 1691), Muslim Sufi saint and poet
- April 28 – Charles Cotton (died 1687), English poet and writer
- Francisco Ayerra de Santa María (died 1708), Puerto Rico's first native born poet

== Deaths ==
Birth years link to the corresponding "[year] in poetry" article:

- March – Thomas Bateson, also spelled "Batson" or "Betson" (born 1570), English-born writer of madrigals
- April 29 – Théodore-Agrippa d'Aubigné (born 1552), French poet, soldier, propagandist and chronicler
- November 19 – Johann Hermann Schein died (born 1586), German
- Also:
  - Pedro Bucaneg (born 1592), blind Filipino poet, "Father of Ilokano literature"
  - Gian Domenico Cancianini (born 1547), Italian, Latin-language poet
  - Samuel Rowlands, died about this year (born c. 1570), English pamphleteer, poet and satirist
  - Jacob Uziel (born unknown), Spanish physician and poet

== See also ==
- Poetry
- 16th century in poetry
- 16th century in literature
