= 1561 in poetry =

This article covers 1561 in poetry. Nationality words link to articles with information on the nation's poetry or literature (for instance, Irish or French).

== Works published ==
=== England ===
- Thomas Blundeville, translated from the Latin of Plutarch, Three Morall Treatises, first two treatises in verse
- Geoffrey Chaucer, The Woorkes of Geffrey Chaucer, edited by John Stow, based on the Tynne edition of 1532; see also Thomas Speght's edition of the Workes 1598)
- Barnabe Googe, translated from Marcello Palingenio Stellato's Zodiacus vitae [c. 1528]), The Zodiac of Life, Books 1–4, published in Latin and English (see also The Zodiac of Life 1560, 1565)

=== Other ===
- Jan Blahoslav, author and editor, Šamotulský kancionál ("Šamotulský hymn-book"), a "cantionale" or hymn-book; a Czech poet published in Polish (see also Ivančice hymn-book 1564, a revised edition)
- Julius Caesar Scaliger, Poetices libri septem ("Seven Books of Poetics"), Italian critic published in Lyon, France, very influential, but derivative criticism

== Births ==
Death years link to the corresponding "[year] in poetry" article:

- January 22 – Francis Bacon (died 1626), English philosopher, statesman, scientist, lawyer, jurist, author and poet
- April 8 – Dominicus Baudius (died 1613), Dutch Neo-Latin poet, scholar and historian
- July 11 – Luis de Góngora (died 1627), Spanish lyric poet
- October 27 – Mary Herbert (died 1621), English poet, translator, patron, hostess of a literary salon, and sister of Philip Sidney
- Also:
  - Gaspar Aguilar (died 1623), Spanish poet and dramatist
  - Bernardo de Balbuena (died 1627), Spanish-born Latin American poet
  - Henry Lok birth year uncertain (died 1608), English
  - Nicolas de Montreux (died 1608), French nobleman, novelist, poet, translator and dramatist
  - Robert Southwell year of birth uncertain (died 1595), English Jesuit priest and poet

== Deaths ==
Birth years link to the corresponding "[year] in poetry" article:

- John Calvin (born 1509), Swiss, French-language Protestant religious leader who wrote hymns
- George Cavendish, (born either 1500 or 1494), English
- Nikolaus Herman (born c. 1500), German
- Olivier de Magny (born 1529), French
- Jorge de Montemayor (born 1521), Portuguese novelist and poet, who wrote almost exclusively in Spanish

== See also ==
- Poetry
- 16th century in poetry
- 16th century in literature
- Dutch Renaissance and Golden Age literature
- Elizabethan literature
- French Renaissance literature
- Renaissance literature
- Spanish Renaissance literature
