= 1566 in poetry =

This article covers 1566 in poetry. Nationality words link to articles with information on the nation's poetry or literature (for instance, Irish or France).

== Works published ==
=== England ===
- Peter Beverley, The Historie of Ariodanto and Ieneura
- Thomas Churchyard:
  - Churchyard's Round
  - Churchyardes Farewell
  - Churchyardes Lamentacion of Freyndshyp
- Thomas Drant, translation (from the Latin of Horace's Ars Poetica) A Medicinable Morall (see also Horace his Arte of Poetrie 1567)

== Births ==
Death years link to the corresponding "[year] in poetry" article:

- October 6 (birth year uncertain) — Marie de Gournay, also known as Marie le Jars, demoiselle de Gournay (died 1645), French writer, author of feminist tracts and poet; a close associate of Michel de Montaigne; buried in the Saint-Eustache Church in Paris
- November 26 – Francesco Bracciolini (died 1645), Italian
- Also:
  - Giambattista Basile (died 1632), Italian poet, courtier and collector of fairy tales
  - Thomas Bastard (died 1618), English poet and clergyman
  - John Hoskins (died 1638), English poet, classicist and judge
  - Luisa Carvajal y Mendoza (died 1614), Spanish aristocrat, religious poet and author and Catholic missionary to England

== Deaths ==
Birth years link to the corresponding "[year] in poetry" article:

- April 25 – Louise Labé (born ca. 1524), French
- September 5, 6 or 7 – Suleyman the Magnificent (born ca. 1495), Ottoman Empire sultan and poet
- September 7 – Martin Bošňák (born ca. 1500), Slovak
- September 27 – Marco Girolamo Vida (born 1485), Italian, Latin-language poet
- October 31 – Richard Edwardes (or Edwards, born 1525), English poet and playwright
- November 17 – Annibale Caro (born 1507), Italian

== See also ==
- Poetry
- 16th century in poetry
- 16th century in literature
- Dutch Renaissance and Golden Age literature
- Elizabethan literature
- French Renaissance literature
- Renaissance literature
- Spanish Renaissance literature
