= 1548 in poetry =

Nationality words link to articles with information on the nation's poetry or literature (for instance, Irish or France).

== Works published ==
=== Great Britain ===
- Princess Elizabeth, Mirror of the Sinful Soul (translation of Marguerite de Navarre, Miroir de l'âme pécheresse)
- Sir David Lindsay (also spelled "David Lyndsay"), The Tragical Death of David Beton Bishoppe of Sainct Andrews, publication year uncertain
- Luke Shepherd:
  - Antipus
  - Doctour Doubble Ale, publication year uncertain; an anti-Catholic poem
  - John Bon and Mast Person, publication year uncertain; the author was imprisoned twice on account of this work
  - Pathos, publication year uncertain
  - The Upcheering of the Mass

=== Other ===
- Luigi Alamanni, Girone il Cortese, a poetical romance; Italian writer published in Paris, France
- Anna Bijns, Refrains, Netherlands, second edition (prior edition 1528, subsequent edition 1567)
- Francisco Robortelli, In Aristotelis poeticam explicationes, commentary reinterpreting Aristotle's Poetics for the humanist; Florence; criticism, (second edition 1555), Italy
- Thomas Sébillet Art poëtique françoys, on French verse; criticism

== Births ==
Death years link to the corresponding "[year] in poetry" article:

- Luis Barahona de Soto (died 1595), Spanish poet and physician
- Juraj Baraković (died 1628), Croatian Renaissance poet from Zadar
- Giles Fletcher, the Elder (born 1548 or 1549) (died 1611), English poet and diplomat
- Edward Grant (died 1601), English scholar, poet, and headmaster of Westminster School
- Cornelis Ketel (died 1616), Dutch Mannerist painter, poet, and orator
- Jean de La Ceppède (died 1623), French poet
- Karel van Mander (died 1606), Flemish-born Dutch painter and poet
- Geoffrey Whitney (died 1601), English poet
- Ma Xianglan (died 1604), Chinese artist, playwright, poet, and calligrapher

== Deaths ==
Birth years link to the corresponding "[year] in poetry" article:

- Zâtî (born 1471), Turkish poet who taught and greatly influenced Bâkî
- John Bellenden (born 1500), English
- Johannes Dantiscus (born 1485), bishop and poet known as the Father of Polish Diplomacy

== See also ==
- Poetry
- 16th century in poetry
- 16th century in literature
- French Renaissance literature
- Renaissance literature
- Spanish Renaissance literature
