= 1523 in poetry =

Nationality words link to articles with information on the nation's poetry or literature (for instance, Irish or France).

== Works published ==
- Alexander Barclay, The Mirror of Good Manners, publication year uncertain, translated from Dominic Mancini's De quatuor virtutibus, in English and Latin; London: Richard Pynson
- Hans Sachs, die Wittenbergische Nachtigall, allegorical story in verse in praise of Luther
- John Skelton, The Garland of Laurel

== Births ==
Death years link to the corresponding "[year] in poetry" article:

- February 20 – Jan Blahoslav (died 1571), Czech poet and translator
- Approximate date – Girolamo Maggi (died 1572), Italian scholar, jurist, poet, military engineer, urban planner, philologist, archaeologist, mathematician and naturalist

== Deaths ==
Birth years link to the corresponding "[year] in poetry" article:

- Stephen Hawes, death year uncertain, birth year unknown; English
- Ulrich von Hutten (born 1488), German
- Faustino Perisauli (born 1450), Italian, Latin-language poet
- Tang Yin died this year, according to some sources, or 1524 according to others (born 1470), Chinese poet, painter and calligrapher

== See also ==
- Poetry
- 16th century in poetry
- 16th century in literature
- French Renaissance literature
- Renaissance literature
- Spanish Renaissance literature
