= 1596 in poetry =

This article covers 1596 in poetry. Nationality words link to articles with information on the nation's poetry or literature (for instance, Irish or France).

From your confessor, lawyer and physician,
Hide not your case on no condition

— From Sir John Harington, A New Discourse of a Stale Subject, called the Metamorphosis of Ajax

== Works published in English ==
- Anonymous, King Edward the Fourth and the Tanner of Tamworth, a ballad
- Thomas Campion, Poemata
- Thomas Churchyard, A Pleasant Discourse of Court and Wars
- Henoch Clapham, A Briefe of the Bible
- Peter Colse, Penelopes Complaint; or, A Mirrour for Wanton Minions
- Anthony Copley, A Fig for Fortune
- Roger Cotton:
  - An Armour of Proofe: Brought from the tower of David, to fight against Spannyardes, and all enimies of the trueth
  - A Spirituall Song: Conteining an historicall discourse from the infancie of the world, until the present time
- Sir John Davies, published anonymously, Orchestra; or, A Poem of Dauncing
- John Dickenson, The Shepheardes Complaint
- Michael Drayton:
  - Mortimeriados, a long poem on the Wars of the Roses, in ottava rima (revised as The Barrons Wars 1603)
  - The Tragicall Legend of Robert Duke of Normandy: [with] The legend of Maltilda; The legend of Piers Gaveston
- Bartholomew Griffin, Fidessa, a sequence of sonnets
- Sir John Harington, A New Discourse of a Stale Subject, called the Metamorphosis of Ajax (also known by the shorter title Metamorphosis of Ajax), a satire for which Harrington was banished from the English court
- Gervase Markham, The Poem of Poems; or, Sions Muse
- Christopher Middleton, The Historie of Heaven
- William Smith, Chloris; or, The Complaint of the Passionate Despised Shepheard
- Edmund Spenser:
  - Colin Clouts Come Home Againe
  - Fowre Hymnes, published with the second edition of Daphnaida 1591
  - Prothalamion; or, A Spousall Verse in Honour of the Double Marriage of Ladie Elizabeth and Ladie Katherine Somerset
  - The Second Part of the Faerie Queene: Containing the fourth, fifth and sixth books (books 1–3 first published in 1590; see also Faerie Queene 1609)
- William Warner, Albions England, fourth edition (12 books); see also Albions England 1586, second edition 1589, third edition 1592, fifth edition 1602, A Continuance of Albions England 1606

== Works published in other languages ==
- Francisco Rodrigues Lobo, Romances
- Alonso Pinciano, Filosofía antigua poética ("Antique Poetic Philosophy"), Spanish criticism

== Births ==
- September 4 – Constantijn Huygens (died 1687), Dutch poet and composer
- September – James Shirley (died 1666), English poet and playwright
- Xiao Yuncong (died 1673), Chinese landscape painter, calligrapher, and poet

== Deaths ==
- October 3 – Florent Chrestien (born 1540), French satirist and Latin poet
- Bargeo (born 1517), Italian, Latin-language poet
- Georg List (born 1532), German
- Henry Willobie (born 1575), English
- Ou Daren (born 1516), Ming dynasty poet and scholar

== See also ==
- Poetry
- 16th century in poetry
- 16th century in literature
- Dutch Renaissance and Golden Age literature
- Elizabethan literature
- English Madrigal School
- French Renaissance literature
- Renaissance literature
- Spanish Renaissance literature
- University Wits
