= 1616 in poetry =

Nationality words link to articles with information on the nation's poetry or literature (for instance, Irish or France).

== Events ==
- February 1 – King James I of England grants Ben Jonson an annual pension of 100 marks, making him de facto poet laureate.

== Works published ==
=== Great Britain ===
- William Browne, Britannia's Pastorals. The Second Booke (see also Book 1, 1613; both books published together 1625)
- George Chapman, translator:
  - The Divine Poem of Musaeus. First of all Books, translated from Musaeus', De Herone et Leandro (Hero and Leander)
  - The Whole Works of Homer, publication year uncertain (see also Seaven Bookes of the Iliades of Homer 1598, Homer Prince of Poets 1609, The Iliads of Homer 1611, Homers Odysses 1614, Twenty-four Bookes of Homers Odisses 1615)
- Ben Jonson:
  - To Celia
  - On my first Sonne
  - The Workes of Beniamin Ionson (the first folio collection, including Epigrams and The Forest)
- Robert Southwell, S.J., S. Peters Complaint. And Saint Mary Magdalens Funerall Teares, "By R.S. of the Society of Jesus" (see also Marie Magdalens Funeral Teares 1591 and Saint Peters Complaint 1595)

=== Other ===
- Agrippa d'Aubigné, Les Tragiques, France
- Georg Rudolf Weckherlin, Odes and Songs, Germany

== Births ==
Death years link to the corresponding "[year] in poetry" article:

- March 13 – Joseph Beaumont (died 1699), English clergyman, academic and poet
- July 10 – Antonio del Castillo y Saavedra (died 1668), Spanish Baroque painter, sculptor and poet
- October 11 – Andreas Gryphius (died 1664), German poet and dramatist
- Also:
  - Christen Aagaard (died 1664), Danish poet and professor
  - Johann Klaj (died 1656), German poet
  - Sokuhi Nyoitsu (died 1671), Chinese Buddhist monk, poet and calligrapher
  - Ye Xiaoluan, Chinese poet and daughter of poet Shen Yixiu; her sisters, Ye Wanwan and Ye Xiaowan are also poets

== Deaths ==
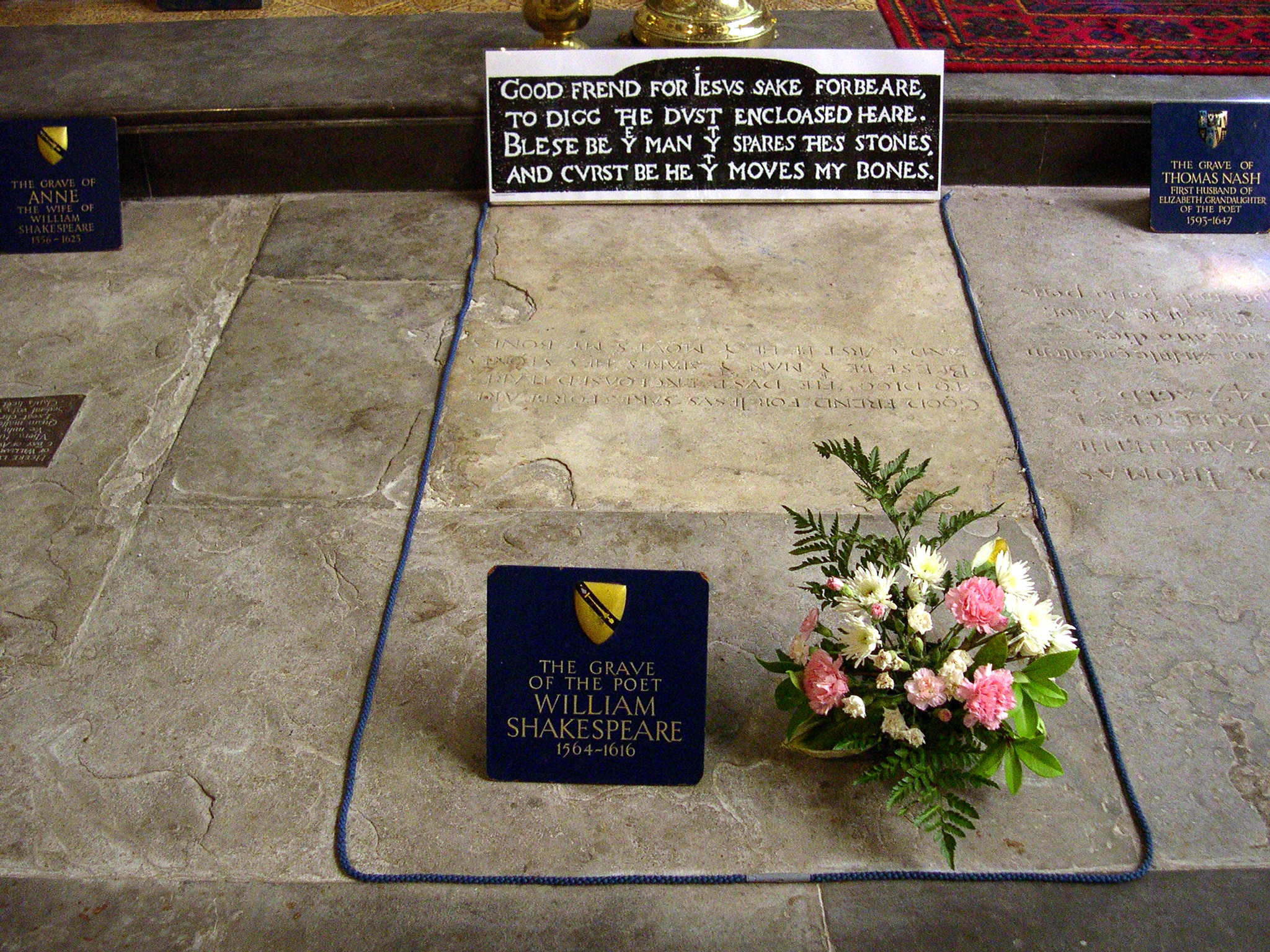
The grave of the poet William Shakespeare at Holy Trinity Church, Stratford-upon-Avon

Birth years link to the corresponding "[year] in poetry" article:

- March 6 – Francis Beaumont (born 1584), English playwright and poet
- March 18 – Cornelis Ketel (born 1548), Dutch Mannerist painter, poet and orator
- April 22 (Gregorian calendar) – Miguel de Cervantes (born 1547), Spanish novelist, poet and playwright
- April 23 (Julian calendar) – William Shakespeare (born 1564), English playwright and poet, widely regarded as the greatest writer in the English language

== See also ==
- Poetry
- 16th century in poetry
- 16th century in literature
