= 1604 in poetry =

This article covers 1604 in poetry. Nationality words link to articles with information on the nation's poetry or literature (for instance, Irish or France).

== Works ==
=== Great Britain ===
- Sir William Alexander:
  - Aurora
  - A Paraenesis to the Prince (to Henry, Prince of Wales)
- Thomas Bateson, Cantus (the first English madrigals)
- Nicholas Breton, The Passionate Shepheard, or The shepheardes love... With many excellent conceited poems and pleasant sonnets, fit for young heads to passe away, written under the pen name "Bonerto"
- Thomas Churchyard, Churchyards Good Will, on the death of John Whitgift, Archbishop of Canterbury
- John Cooke, Epigrames
- Thomas Dekker, Newes from Graves-end: Sent to Nobody, published anonymously
- Michael Drayton:
  - Moyses in a Map of his Miracles
  - The Owle
  - A Paean Triumphall
- Samuel Rowlands, Looke to it: for, Ile Stabbe Ye
- Anthony Skoloker, Daiphantus, or the Passions of Love

=== Other ===
- Bernardo de Balbuena, La Grandeza Mexicana ("Mexico's Grandeur"), Spanish poet and churchman at this time in Mexico
- Jean Vauquelin de La Fresnaye, Discours pour servir de Préface sur le Sujet de la Satyre ("Discourse Serving as a Preface on the Subject of Satire") published from this year through 1605

== Births ==
- January 4 – Jakob Balde (died 1668), German scholar, poet and teacher
- July 8 – Heinrich Albert (died 1651), German composer and poet
- August 4 – François Hédelin (died 1676), French abbé of Aubignac and Meymac, poet and playwright
- October 16 – Assoucy (died 1677), French musician and burlesque poet
- November 23 (bapt.) – Jasper Mayne (died 1672), English clergyman, translator, minor poet and dramatist
- Also:
  - Charles Cotin (died 1681), French abbé, philosopher and poet
  - Girolamo Graziani (died 1675), Italian poet
  - Philippe Habert (died 1637), French poet
  - Cheng Zhengkui (died 1670), Chinese landscape painter and poet

== Deaths ==
- April 1 – Thomas Churchyard (born c. 1520), English poet and author
- June 24 – Edward de Vere, 17th Earl of Oxford (born 1550), English courtier, playwright, poet, sportsman, patron of numerous writers, and sponsor of at least two acting companies
- October 8 – Janus Dousa (born 1545), Dutch statesman, historian, poet and philologist
- November – Thomas Storer (born c. 1571), English poet
- Also – Ma Xianglan (born 1548), Chinese artist, playwright, poet and calligrapher; a woman
