= 1547 in poetry =

This article covers 1547 in poetry. Nationality words link to articles with information on the nation's poetry or literature (for instance, Irish or France).

== Works published ==
=== France ===
- Joachim du Bellay, À la ville du Mans
- Antoine Héroët, Opuscules d'amour par Héroet, La Borderie et autres divins poetes ("Booklets of Love by Heroet, La Borderie and other divine poets"), including Héroët's Complainte d'une dame nouvellement surprise d'amour; published in Lyon, France
- Marguerite de Navarre, Les Marguerites de la Marguerite des princesses, long devotional poem
- Maurice Scève, La Saulsaye, églogue de la vie solitaire ("The Willow Grove: Eclogue of the Solitary Life"), a pastoral poem consisting of a debate between two shepherds on the subject of the differences between town and country and on the court

=== Other ===
- Martynas Mažvydas, Catechismus ("The Simple Words of Catechismus"), the first printed Lithuanian book, includes a dedication in Latin "To the Great Duchy of Lithuania", two prefaces: in Latin (in prose), and in Lithuanian (in verse), a catechism, and the book of songs; the rhymed preface in Lithuanian, "The Appeal of The Small Book Itself Unto Lithuanians and Samogitians", has been called "the first authentic verse in Lithuanian"
- Tullia d'Aragona, Rime, Italy
- Giangiorgio Trissino, L'Italia liberata dai Goti ("The Deliverance of Italy from the Goths"), epic poem, Italy

== Births ==
Death years link to the corresponding "[year] in poetry" article:

- Sheikh Bahaii (died 1621), Persian scientist, architect, philosopher, and poet
- Gian Domenico Cancianini (died 1630), Italian, Latin-language poet
- Miguel de Cervantes (died 1616), Spanish novelist, poet, and playwright
- Faizi (died 1595), Indian poet laureate of the Emperor Akbar
- Johann Fischart born this year or 1546 (died 1591), German
- Martin Moller (died 1606), German poet and mystic
- Philipp Nicodemus Frischlin (died 1590), German philologist, poet, playwright, mathematician and astronomer
- Richard Stanihurst, also spelled "Richard Stanyhurst" (died 1618), Irish alchemist, translator, poet and historian
- Maciej Stryjkowski (died 1593), Polish-Lithuanian historian, writer and poet
- Roemer Visscher (died 1620), Dutch merchant and writer, especially of epigrams and emblemata

== Deaths ==
Birth years link to the corresponding "[year] in poetry" article:

- January 18 – Pietro Bembo (born 1470), Italian cardinal, poet and writer
- January 19 – Henry Howard, Earl of Surrey, (born c. 1517), English poet and aristocrat, executed for treason
- February 25 – Vittoria Colonna (born 1490), Italian noblewoman and poet
- October or November – John Redford (born c. 1500), English composer, poet and playwright
- Also:
  - Lazare de Baïf (born 1496), French poet, diplomat and humanist
  - Meerabai मीराबाई (born 1498), alternate spelling: Meera, Mira, Meera Bai; Indian, Hindu poet-saint, mystical poet whose compositions, extant version of which are in Gujarati and a Rajasthani dialect of Hindi, remain popular throughout India

== See also ==
- Poetry
- 16th century in poetry
- 16th century in literature
- French Renaissance literature
- Renaissance literature
- Spanish Renaissance literature
