= 1628 in poetry =

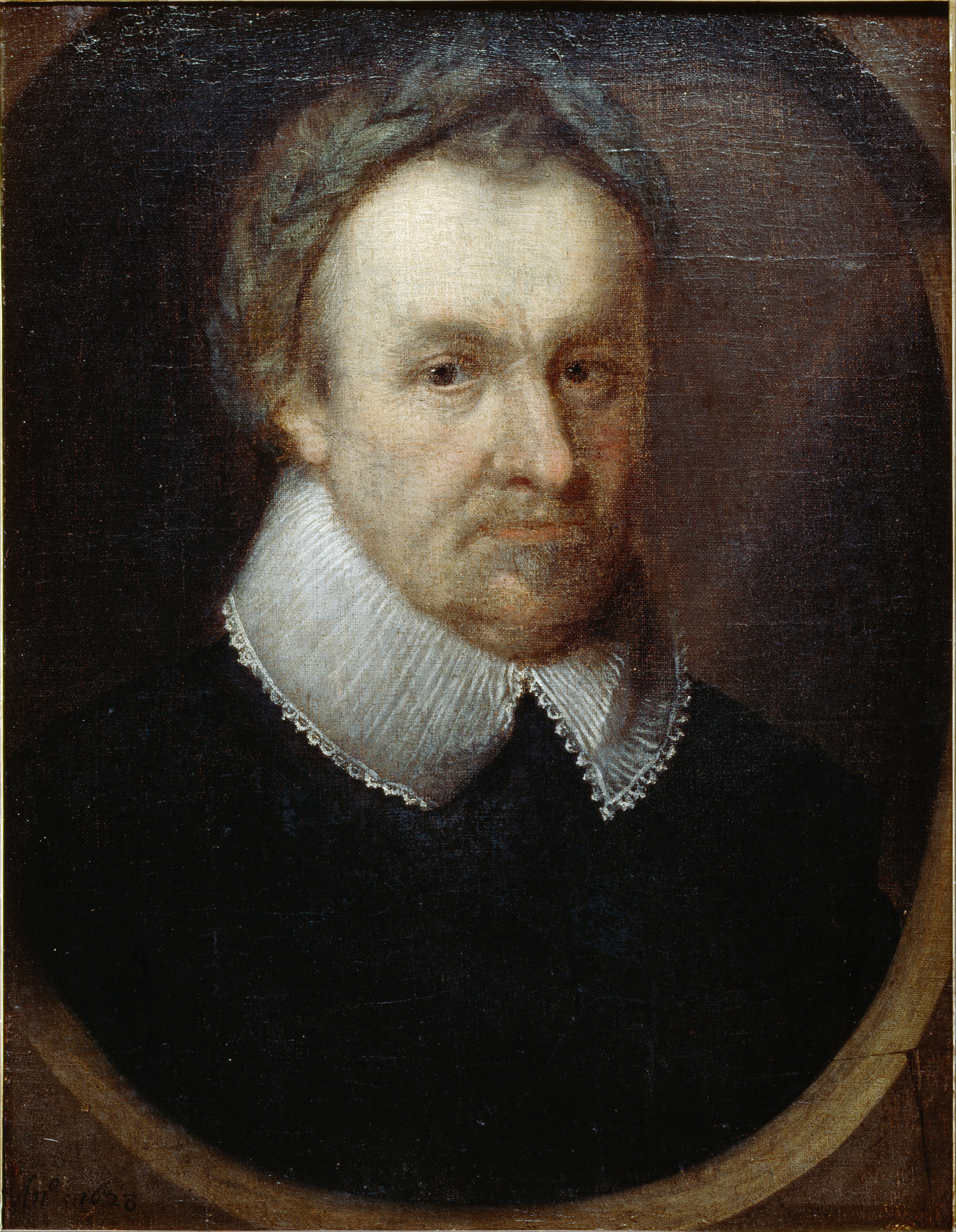
English poet Michael Drayton this year

This article covers 1628 in poetry. Nationality words link to articles with information on the nation's poetry or literature (for instance, Irish or France).

== Works published ==
=== Great Britain ===
- John Clavell, A Recantation of an Ill Led Life; or, A Discoverie of the High-way Law
- Phineas Fletcher, Brittain's Ida, published anonymously; has been attributed to Edmund Spenser and Giles Fletcher the younger
- Robert Gomersall, The Levites Revenge
- Robert Hayman, Qvodlibets ("What you will"), the first book of English poetry written in what would become Canada, written by the Proprietary Governor of Bristol's Hope colony in Newfoundland
- Thomas May, translator, Virgil's Georgicks Englished
- Henry Reynolds, Torquato Tasso's Aminta Englisht
- George Wither, Britain's Remembrancer: Containing a narration of the plague lately past (see also Haleluiah 1641)

=== Other ===
- Luis de Góngora, a calf-bound, de luxe, three-volume edition of the author's works, authorized and compiled in collaboration with Antonio Chacón y Ponce de León in 1620, considered to be the most authoritative version of Gongora's works. The "publication" here was the book's presentation to the Conde-Duque de Olivares

== Births ==
Death years link to the corresponding "[year] in poetry" article:

- January 30 – George Villiers, 2nd Duke of Buckingham (died 1687), English statesman and poet
- Bahinabai (died 1700), Varkari female poet-saint from Maharashtra
- François Colletet (died 1680), French
- Zbigniew Morsztyn (died 1689), Polish poet

== Deaths ==
Birth years link to the corresponding "[year] in poetry" article:

- February – Christopher Brooke, English poet, lawyer and politician
- February 3 – Simon Goulart (born 1543) Swiss, French-language clergyman, writer and poet
- February 5 (bur.) – Christopher Middleton, (born c. 1560), English poet and translator
- August 1 – Juraj Baraković (born 1548), Croatian Renaissance poet from Zadar
- September 30 – Fulke Greville, 1st Baron Brooke (born 1554), English poet, dramatist and statesman
- October 16 – François de Malherbe (born 1555), French

== See also ==
- Poetry
- 16th century in poetry
- 16th century in literature
