= 1526 in poetry =

This article covers 1526 in poetry. Nationality words link to articles with information on the nation's poetry or literature (for instance, Irish or France).

== Works published ==
=== Great Britain ===
- Geoffrey Chaucer, posthumously published:
  - The Canterbury Tales, the Pynson edition (see Canturbyry Tales 1477)
  - The House of Fame, publication year uncertain, Pynson edition (see also The House of Fame 1483)
  - Troilus and Criseyde, publication year uncertain, published anonymously, Pynson edition (see also Troilus and Criseyde 1483)

=== Italy ===
- Giorgio Anselmo, six books of epigrams, octavo volumes, Parma; in Latin
- Teofilo Folengo, writing under the pen name "Limerno Pitocco (Merlin the Beggar) da Mantova", Orlandino, a poem of eight cantos, written in rhymed octaves
- Jacopo Sannazaro:
  - De Partu Virginis ("The Virgin's Childbirth"), epic, religious poem
  - Piscatoria ("Piscatorial Eclogues"), five books are extant and a fragmentary version of a sixth book

=== Other ===
- Shin Maha Rahtathara, Kogan Pyo, Burma

== Births ==
Death years link to the corresponding "[year] in poetry" article:

- Mahmud Abdülbâkî (محمود عبد الباقى), known by his pen name "Bâḳî" (باقى), Ottoman Turk (died 1600)
- Tani Soyo 谷宗養 (died 1563), Japanese renga poet; a rival of Satomura Joha; son of Tani Sobuko

== Deaths ==
Birth years link to the corresponding "[year] in poetry" article:

- Jean Marot died about this year (born c. 1450), French poet and father of poet Clément Marot

== See also ==
- Poetry
- 16th century in poetry
- 16th century in literature
- French Renaissance literature
- Renaissance literature
- Spanish Renaissance literature
