= 1527 in poetry =

This article covers 1527 in poetry. Nationality words link to articles with information on the nation's poetry or literature (for instance, Irish or France).

== Works published ==
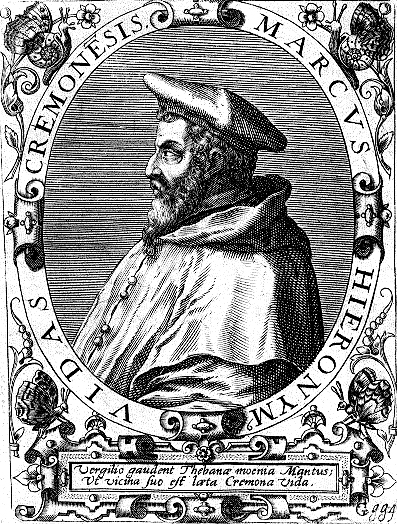
Marco Girolamo Vida

- Pietro Aretino, Sonetti Lussuriosi ("Sonnets of lust" or "Aretino's Postures"), to accompany an edition of Raimondi's erotic engravings, I Modi, Italy
- John Skelton, Skelton Laureate Agaynste a Comely Coystrowne, publication year uncertain; also contains "Upon a Dead Man's Head" and "Womanhood, Wanton ye want", England
- Gian Travers, Chianzun dalla guerra dagl Chiaste da Müs, Putèr variety of Romansh language, Switzerland
- Marco Girolamo Vida, also known as "Hieronymus Vida", Italy:
  - De arte poetica ("The Art of Poetry"), tract on poetic theory partly inspired by Horace
  - Scacchia, Ludus ("The Game of Chess"), about the creation of chess as a way for the mythological Greek god Mercury to win over Caissa; involves a chess game between Apollo and Mercury in the presence of the other gods; a 658-line poem in Virgilian hexameters, translated into many languages over the centuries (an unauthorized, 742-line version appears in 1525 with some different names; in 1763 the English author and poet Sir William Jones publishes another chess poem involving the characters of Mercury and Caissa)

== Births ==
Death years link to the corresponding "[year] in poetry" article:

- Luis de Leon (died 1591), Spanish mystic and poet
- Łukasz Górnicki, (died 1603), Polish humanist, writer, poet, secretary and chancellor of Sigismund August of Poland

== Deaths ==
Birth years link to the corresponding "[year] in poetry" article:

- Andrea Fulvio (born 1470), Italian Renaissance humanist, poet and antiquarian
- Niccolò Machiavelli (born 1469), Italian philosopher, writer, poet, musician, and politician
- Šiško Menčetić (born 1457), Croatian poet and Ragusan nobleman
- Panfilo Sasso (born 1450), Italian, Latin-language poet

== See also ==
- Poetry
- 16th century in poetry
- 16th century in literature
- French Renaissance literature
- Renaissance literature
- Spanish Renaissance literature
