= 1522 in poetry =

This article covers 1522 in poetry. Nationality words link to articles with information on the nation's poetry or literature (for instance, Irish or France).

== Works published ==
- Biernat of Lublin, Zywot Ezopa ("The Life of Aesop"), published about this year, Poland
- Robert Copland, Ipomadon, publication year uncertain; derived from the Anglo-Norman Ipomedon (c. 1190) of Hue de Rotelande
- Thomas Murner, Of the Great Lutheran Fool, a verse satire against Martin Luther; the "Great Lutheran fool" is a personification of all those who were misled by Lutheranism; the author's most famous work; Germany

== Births ==
Death years link to the corresponding "[year] in poetry" article:

- Approximate date
  - Joachim du Bellay (died 1560), French poet
  - Siôn Tudur (died 1602), Welsh language poet

== Deaths ==
Birth years link to the corresponding "[year] in poetry" article:

- June 30 – Johann Reuchlin (born 1455), German humanist scholar and poet
- September – Gavin Douglas (born c. 1474), Scottish poet and bishop

== See also ==
- Poetry
- 16th century in poetry
- 16th century in literature
- French Renaissance literature
- Renaissance literature
- Spanish Renaissance literature
