= 1524 in poetry =

This article covers 1524 in poetry. Nationality words link to articles with information on the nation's poetry or literature (for instance, Irish or France).

== Works published ==
- Robert Copland, Epilogue to the Syege of Rodes self-published in London; Great Britain

== Births ==
Death years link to the corresponding "[year] in poetry" article:

- May 28 – Selim II (died 1574), Ottoman Turkish sultan and poet
- September 11 – Pierre de Ronsard (died 1585), French prince des poètes
- Date unknown – Thomas Tusser (died 1580), English chorister, agriculturalist and poet
- Approximate year
  - Luís de Camões, also known as "Luiz Camoes" (died 1580), Portuguese national poet
  - Louise Labé (died 1566), French poet
  - Girolamo Parabosco (died 1577), Italian poet and musician

== Deaths ==
Birth years link to the corresponding "[year] in poetry" article:

- January 5 – Marko Marulić (born 1450), Croatian poet and Christian humanist, known as "the Crown of the Croatian Medieval Age" and the "father of the Croatian Renaissance"; He signed his works as "Marko Marulić Splićanin" ("Marko Marulić of Split"), "Marko Pečenić", "Marcus Marulus Spalatensis", or "Dalmata"
- January 7 – Tang Yin died this year, according to some sources, or 1523 according to others (born 1470), Chinese poet, painter and calligrapher
- Giovanni Aurelio Augurelli (born 1456), Italian, Latin-language poet
- Francesco Negri (humanist) died this year or sometime later (born 1452), Italian, Latin-language poet

== See also ==
- Poetry
- 16th century in poetry
- 16th century in literature
- French Renaissance literature
- Renaissance literature
- Spanish Renaissance literature
