= 1671 in poetry =

Nationality words link to articles with information on the nation's poetry or literature (for instance, Irish or France).

== Events ==
- Antoinette du Ligier de la Garde Deshoulières awarded the first prize given for poetry by the Académie française

== Works published ==
- Anonymous, Westminster-Drollery; or, A Choice Collection of the Newest Songs & Poems Both at Court & Theaters (second part published in 1672)
- John Milton, Paradise Regain'd: A poem [...] To which is added Samson Agonistes, published in May (Samson Agonistes published separately in 1681)

== Births ==
Death years link to the corresponding "[year] in poetry" article:

- April 6 – Jean-Baptiste Rousseau (died 1741), French poet and epigrammatist
- September 7 – Antoine Danchet (died 1748), French playwright, librettist and dramatic poet
- September 28 – Sarah Dixon (died 1765), English poet
- November 6 – Colley Cibber (died 1757), English actor-manager, playwright and Poet Laureate

== Deaths ==
Birth years link to the corresponding "[year] in poetry" article:

- April 30 – Fran Krsto Frankopan (born 1643), Croatian poet and politician (executed)
- September 28 – Jean de Montigny (born 1636), French philosophic writer and poet
- Pierre Le Moyne (born 1602), French Jesuit poet
- Sokuhi Nyoitsu (born 1616), Chinese Buddhist monk, poet and calligrapher
- Yun Sŏndo (born 1587), Korean poet and government official

== See also ==
- Poetry
- 17th century in poetry
- 17th century in literature
- Restoration literature
