= 1510 in poetry =

This article covers 1510 in poetry. Nationality words link to articles with information on the nation's poetry or literature (for instance, Irish or France).

== Works published ==
=== Great Britain ===
- Anonymous, Merlin, based on the second of two versions of the Middle English romance Arthur and Merlin, itself derived ultimately from the Old French prose Merlin, part of the Arthurian Vulgate Cycle of the early 13th century
- Stephen Hawes, year uncertain, The Example of Vertu, publisher: Wynkyn de Worde
- John Lydgate, Proverbs, publication year uncertain; posthumously published; written c. 1431–1438; consists for the most part on extracts from The Fall of Princes 1494
- Sir Thomas More, The Life of Johan Picus Erle of Myrandula, publication year uncertain, a life of Giovanni Pico della Mirandola, Italian humanist and philosopher and member of the Platonic Academy in Florence

=== Other ===
- Jean Marot, Voyage de Gênes, France
- La grant danse macabre (approximate date)

== Births ==
Death years link to the corresponding "[year] in poetry" article:

- Arnoldus Arlenius (died 1582), Dutch humanist philosopher and poet
- Giovanni Darcio, born about this year (died after 1554), Italian, Latin-language poet
- Sebestyén Tinódi Lantos (died 1556), Hungarian lyricist, epic poet, political historian, and minstrel
- Martynas Mažvydas (died 1563), author and editor of the first printed book in the Lithuanian language, including the first poetry
- Thomas Phaer (also spelled Phaire, Faer, Phayre, and Phayer), born about this year (died 1560), English lawyer and translator of poetry
- Anton Francesco Ranieri (died 1560), Italian, Latin-language poet
- Satomura Shokyu 里村昌休 (died 1552), Japanese leading master of the linked verse renga after the death of Tani Sobuko in 1545
- Luigi Tansillo (died 1568), Italian poet of Petrarchan sonnets and Marinist style
- Robert Wedderburn born about this year (died c. 1554), Scottish

== Deaths ==
Birth years link to the corresponding "[year] in poetry" article:

- Guillaume Coquillart (born c. 1450), French
- Giovanni Cotta (born c. 1480), Italian, Latin-language poet
- Pothana (born 1450), Telugu poet best known for his translation of the Bhagavata Purana from Sanskrit to Telugu

== See also ==
- Poetry
- 16th century in poetry
- 16th century in literature
- French Renaissance literature
- Grands Rhétoriqueurs
- Renaissance literature
- Spanish Renaissance literature
