= 1516 in poetry =

This article covers 1516 in poetry. Nationality words link to articles with information on the nation's poetry or literature (for instance, Irish or France).

== Works published ==
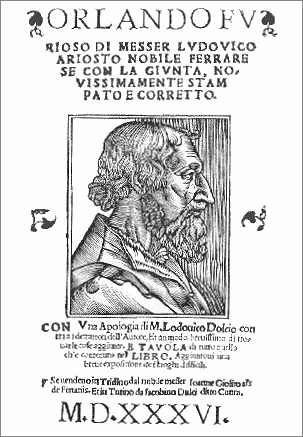
Title page, Ariosto's Orlando Furioso

- Ludovico Ariosto, Orlando Furioso, earliest published version (see also 1532), Italy
- Robert Fabyan, Chronicle, London: Richard Pynson, publisher; Great Britain
- Baptista Mantuanus, Italian poet writing in Latin published in France:
  - Agellaria
  - De sacris diebus, 12 books, explaining the various saints' days of the church calendar, published in Lyon
- Garcia de Resende, editor, Cancioneiro Geral ("General Songbook"), anthology, Portugal

== Births ==
- March 26 – Konrad Gesner (died 1565), Swiss, German-language naturalist, bibliographer and poet
- April 23 – Georg Fabricius (died 1571), German poet, historian and archaeologist
- unknown - Ou Daren (died 1596 in poetry), Ming dynasty poet and scholar.

== Death ==
- March 22 – Baptista Mantuanus, also known as "Battista Mantovano" and "Johannes Baptista Spagnolo" (born 1447), Italian Carmelite reformer, humanist and Latin-language poet
- Ugolino Verino (born 1438), Italian, Latin-language poet

== See also ==
- Poetry
- 16th century in poetry
- 16th century in literature
- French Renaissance literature
- Grands Rhétoriqueurs
- Renaissance literature
- Spanish Renaissance literature
