= 1564 in poetry =

This article covers 1564 in poetry. Nationality words link to articles with information on the nation's poetry or literature (for instance, Irish or France).

== Works published ==
- Jan Blahoslav, author and editor, Ivančice hymn-book, a revised edition of the (Protestant) Polish-language Šamotulský kancionál ("Šamotulský hymn-book") 1561, Czech
- Helius Eobanus Hessus, Idyls, German writing in Latin, third revised edition, Frankfort (see also first edition 1509)
- Jan Kochanowski, Chess (Szachy), published either this year or in 1565, Polish

== Births ==
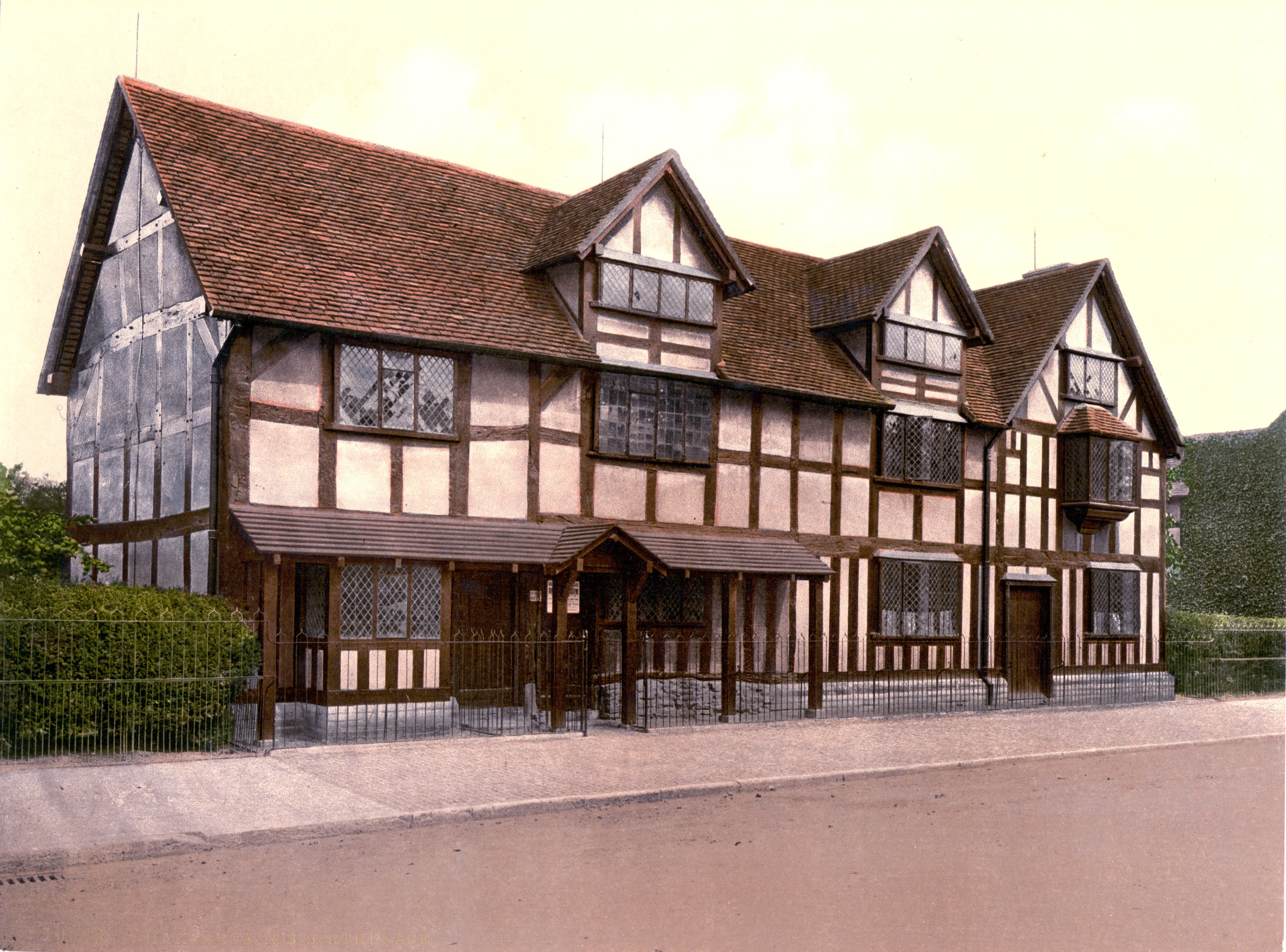
Shakespeare's birthplace, as seen sometime from 1890 –1905)

Death years link to the corresponding "[year] in poetry" article:

- February 26 – baptism date of Christopher Marlowe (died 1593), English dramatist and poet
- April 26 – baptism date of William Shakespeare (died 1616), English dramatist and poet (traditional birthdate April 23)
- Date unknown – Henry Reynolds (died 1632), English poet, schoolmaster and literary critic

== Deaths ==
Birth years link to the corresponding "[year] in poetry" article:

- February 18 – Michelangelo (Michelangelo di Lodovico Buonarroti Simoni) (born 1475), Italian painter, sculptor, architect, poet and engineer
- June 17 – Atagi Fuyuyasu (born 1528), Japanese samurai and poet
- Purandara Dasa (born 1484), Hindu composer of Carnatic music and Kannada poetry
- Rupa Goswami (born 1489), Hindu devotional teacher, poet, and philosopher
- Gruffudd Hiraethog (born unknown), Welsh language poet and scholar
- Maurice Sceve, death year uncertain (born c. 1501), French

== See also ==
- Poetry
- 16th century in poetry
- 16th century in literature
- Dutch Renaissance and Golden Age literature
- Elizabethan literature
- French Renaissance literature
- Renaissance literature
- Spanish Renaissance literature
