= 1608 in poetry =

Nationality words link to articles with information on the nation's poetry or literature (for instance, Irish or France).

== Events ==
- Scottish poet Arthur Johnston goes to Italy to study medicine at Padua.

== Works ==
- Clarinda, Discurso en loor de la poesía (Discourse in Praise of Poetry), poem by pseudonymous Peruvian female poet published in Spain
- Henry Peacham the younger, The More the Merrier: Containing: threescore and odde haad-lesse epigrams
- Samuel Rowlands, Humors Looking Glasse
- Robert Tofte, Ariosto's Satyres (authorship is claimed by Tofte in The Blazon of Jealousie (1615) although Gervase Markham's name is on the title page)

== Births ==
- June – Sir Richard Fanshawe (died 1666), English diplomat, translator, and poet
- December 8 – Vendela Skytte (died 1629), Swedish poet and lady of letters
- December 9 – John Milton (died 1674), English poet and writer
- December 20 (bapt.) – Sir Aston Cokayne (died 1684), English poet and playwright
- Also:
  - Menahem Lonzano (born unknown), Palestinian Masoretic and midrashic scholar, lexicographer and poet
  - Vaman Pandit (died 1695), Marathi scholar and poet of India
  - Samarth Ramdas (died 1681), Marathi saint and religious poet
  - Tukaram (died 1650), Sant (Saint) and spiritual poet during a Bhakti movement
  - Chen Zilong (died 1647), Chinese poet of the Tang School

== Deaths ==
- February 16 – Nicolas Rapin (born 1535), French magistrate, royal officer, translator, poet and satirist
- February 26 – Sir Thomas Craig (born c. 1538), Scottish jurist and poet
- April 19 – Thomas Sackville, 1st Earl of Dorset (born 1536), English statesman and poet
- July 26 – Pablo de Céspedes (born 1538), Spanish painter, poet and architect
- September – Mary Shakespeare, née Arden (born c. 1537), mother of English poet and dramatist William Shakespeare
- October 26 – Philipp Nicolai (born 1556), German poet and composer
- Also:
  - George Bannatyne (born 1545), Scottish collector of poems
  - Henry Lok (born c. 1553), English
  - Nicolas de Montreux (born c 1561), French nobleman, novelist, poet, translator and dramatist
  - Jean Vauquelin de la Fresnaye (born 1536), French
  - Andrzej Zbylitowski (born 1565), Polish
