= 1574 in poetry =

Nationality words link to articles with information on the nation's poetry or literature (for instance, Irish or France).

== Events ==
- Guillaume de Salluste Du Bartas begins work on his major poem, Semaine. It is published in France in 1577.
- Tulsidas begins work on his major poem, Ramcharitmanas.

== Works published ==
- Guillaume de Salluste Du Bartas, La Muse chrétienne, a theoretical work that advocates a Christian poetry; published along with several didactic poems, including Judith, Uranie and Le Triomphe de la foi, Bordeaux, France
- The Mirror for Magistrates (anthology)
- Pierre de Ronsard, La Franciade, France
- Mellin de Saint-Gelais, Œuvres ("Works"), France

== Births ==
- July 1 – Joseph Hall (died 1656), English bishop, satirist, moralist, and poet
- Also:
  - Gerolamo Aleandro (died 1629), Italian, Latin-language poet
  - Richard Barnfield (died 1620), English poet,
  - Nicholas Bourbon (died 1644), French clergyman and neo-Latin poet
  - Nicolas Coeffeteau (died 1623), French theologian, poet and historian
  - John Day born about this year (died c. 1640), English poet and playwright
  - Feng Menglong (died 1645), Chinese writer and poet
  - William Percy (died 1648), English poet

== Deaths ==
- June 17 – Louis Des Masures (born c. 1515), French
- December – Selim II (born 1524), Ottoman Empire sultan and poet
- Also:
  - Rocco Boni, Italian, Latin-language poet
  - Girolamo Amalteo of Oderzo (born 1507), Italian poet who wrote in Latin

== See also ==
- Poetry
- 16th century in poetry
- 16th century in literature
- Dutch Renaissance and Golden Age literature
- Elizabethan literature
- French Renaissance literature
- Renaissance literature
- Spanish Renaissance literature
