= 1593 in poetry =

This article covers 1593 in poetry. Nationality words link to articles with information on the nation's poetry or literature (for instance, Irish or France).

== Works published ==
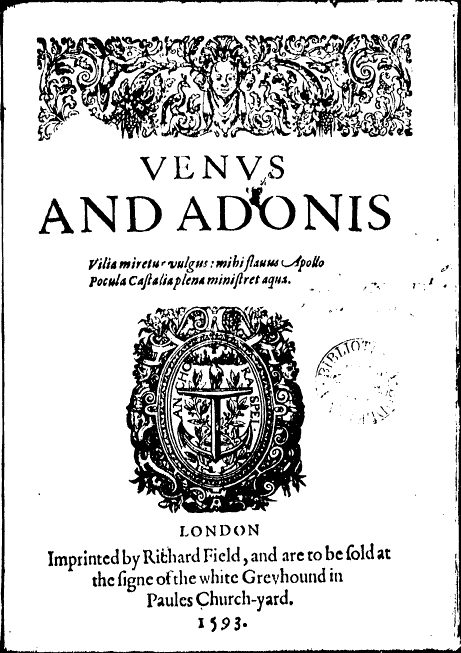
Title page of the first quarto edition of Shakespeare's Venus and Adonis, published this year

- Anonymous, The Phoenix Nest, anthology with poems by Thomas Lodge, Nicholas Breton, Sir Walter Ralegh and others; three elegies on Sir Philip Sidney, the "Phoenix" of the title, open the volume
- Barnabe Barnes, Parthenophil and Parthenophe, contains sonnets, madrigals, elegies and odes
- Anthony Chute, Beauty Dishonoured, written under the title of Shore's Wife
- Henry Constable, Spirituall sonnettes, to the honour of God: and hys saintes, written but unpublished at this time
- Michael Drayton, Idea: the shepheards garland, Fashioned in nine eglogs
- Giles Fletcher, the Elder, published anonymously, Licia, or Poemes of Love
- Robert Henryson, published anonymously, The Testament of Cresseid, first appeared in Thynne's edition of Chaucer's works in 1532
- Thomas Lodge, Phillis: Honoured with pastorall sonnets, elegies and amorous delights
- Henry Lok, Sundry Christian Passions Contained in Two Hundred Sonnets (see also Ecclesiastes 1597)
- Thomas Morely, Cazonets; or, Little Short Songs to Three Voyces verse and music (see also Cazonets 1597)
- George Peele, The Honour of the Garter
- William Shakespeare, Venus and Adonis, probably the author's first published work and printed from his own manuscript; in the author's lifetime his most frequently reprinted work (second edition, 1594)
- Torquato Tasso, Gerusalemme conquistata, a rewriting of the author's Gerusalemme liberata of 1581, Italy

== Births ==
Death years link to the corresponding "[year] in poetry" article:

- April 3 – George Herbert (died 1633), Welsh poet, orator and priest
- June 24 – Abraham von Franckenberg (died 1652), German mystic, author, poet and hymn-writer
- Also:
  - Barten Holyday (died 1661), English clergyman, author and poet

== Deaths ==
Birth years link to the corresponding "[year] in poetry" article:

- January 12 – Amadis Jamyn (born 1538), French poet
- August 19 – Antonio Veneziano (born 1543), Italian poet who wrote in the Sicilian language
- May 30 – Christopher Marlowe (born 1564), English playwright, poet and translator; killed at Deptford
- Also:
  - Chŏng Ch'ŏl, who wrote under the pen names "Kyeham" and "Songgang" (born 1536), Korean statesman and poet
  - Abraham Fraunce (born between 1558 and 1560), English poet
  - Judah Moscato (born 1530), Italian rabbi, poet and philosopher
  - Maciej Stryjkowski (born 1547), Polish-Lithuanian historian, writer and poet
  - Xu Wei (born 1521), Chinese painter, poet and dramatist

== See also ==
- Poetry
- 16th century in poetry
- 16th century in literature
- Dutch Renaissance and Golden Age literature
- Elizabethan literature
- English Madrigal School
- French Renaissance literature
- Renaissance literature
- Spanish Renaissance literature
- University Wits
