= 1509 in poetry =

This article covers 1509 in poetry. Nationality words link to articles with information on the nation's poetry or literature (for instance, Irish or France).

== Works published ==
=== Great Britain ===
- Anonymous, Richard Coeur de Lion, written about 1300, a mix of historical and romance elements
- Antoine de la Sale, The Fyftene Joyes of Maryage, anonymously published, publisher: Wynkyn de Worde; a translation of the original work
- Alexander Barclay, The Shyp of Folys of the Worlde, also known as The Ship of Fools, translated mostly from Latin and French versions of the satire Narrenschiff, also known as Stultifera Navis ("Ship of Fools") 1494 by Sebastian Brandt (see also Henry Watson version published this year); London: Wynkyn de Worde
- Stephen Hawes:
  - The Convercyon of Swervers London: Wynkyn de Worde
  - A Joyfull Medytacyon to all Englande, on the coronation of Henry VIII; London: Wynkyn de Worde
  - The History of Graunde Amour and la Bel Pucel, conteining the knowledge of the Seven Sciences and the Course of Mans Life in this Woride or The Pastyme of Pleasure
- Henry Watson, The Shyppe of Fooles, translated from J. Drouyn's French prose version of Sebastian Brandt's 1494 satire Narrenschiff, also known as Stultifera Navis ("Ship of Fools"; see also Alexander Barclay's version published this year)

=== Other ===
- Laurentius Corvinus publishes Copernicus' Latin translation of the Letters, Byzantine Greek poetry by Theophylactus Simocatta
- Helius Eobanus Hessus, Idyls, German writing in Latin (see also third revised edition 1564, Frankfort)
- Jean Marot, Le Voyage de Venise; France

== Births ==
Death years link to the corresponding "[year] in poetry" article:

- April 25 – Thomas Vaux, (died 1556), English court poet
- July 10 – John Calvin (died 1561), French Protestant religious leader and hymnodist
- August 3 – Étienne Dolet (died 1546), French writer, poet and humanist
- Date not known
  - Annibale Cruceio (died 1577), Italian, Latin-language poet
  - Kanaka Dasa (died 1609), Indian Kannada poet, philosopher, musician and composer from Karnataka

== Deaths ==
Birth years link to the corresponding "[year] in poetry" article:

- Pietro Antonio Piatti died this year or later (born c. 1442), Italian, Latin-language poet
- Juraj Šižgorić (born c. 1440/5), Croatian, Latin-language poet

== See also ==
- Poetry
- 16th century in poetry
- 16th century in literature
- French Renaissance literature
- Grands Rhétoriqueurs
- Renaissance literature
- Spanish Renaissance literature
