= 1641 in poetry =

Nationality words link to articles with information on the nation's poetry or literature (for instance, Irish or France).

== Events ==
- Charles de Sainte-Maure, duc de Montausier presented Guirlande de Julie, a manuscript of 41 madrigals to Julie d'Angennes this year (although the manuscript was not published in full until 1729 in poetry); five of the madrigals were written by Sainte-Maure; the other authors were Georges de Scudéry, Germain Habert, Desmarets de Saint-Sorlin, Valentin Conrart, Chapelain, Racan, Tallemant des Réaux, Antoine Godeau, Robert Arnauld d'Andilly and Simon Arnauld de Pomponne; France

== Works published ==
=== Great Britain ===
- Thomas Beedome, Poems Divine, and Humane
- John Day, The Parliament of Bees, verse drama, first known edition, published posthumously
- Martin Parker, The Poet's Blind Mans Bough; or, Have Among You My Blind Harpers
- Sir Thomas Urquhart, Epigrams: Divine and Moral
- George Wither, Haleluiah; or, Britans [sic] Second Remembrancer (see also Britains Remembrancer 1628)

=== Other ===
- Marie de Gournay, also known as Marie le Jars, demoiselle de Gournay, Les Avis et presents, including a feminist tract, translations, moral essays and verse; second revision (original version, Ombre 1626; revised and retitled, 1634), France

== Births ==
Death years link to the corresponding "[year] in poetry" article:

- February 4 – Jerolim Kavanjin (died 1714), Croatian poet
- April 8 (bapt.) – William Wycherley (died 1716), English playwright and poet
- June 15 – Bernard de la Monnoye (died 1728), French lawyer, poet, philologue and critic

== Deaths ==
Birth years link to the corresponding "[year] in poetry" article:

- January 11 – Juan de Jáuregui (born 1583), Spanish poet, scholar and painter
- August 16 – Thomas Heywood (born sometime early 1570s), English playwright, actor, poet and author
- August – Sir William Vaughan (born 1575), Welsh writer, poet and colonial investor
- Francesca Caccini (born 1587), Italian early Baroque composer, singer, lutenist, poet and music teacher
- Arthur Johnston (born c. 1579), Scottish poet and physician

== See also ==
- Poetry
- 17th century in poetry
- 17th century in literature
- Cavalier poets in England, who supported the monarch against the puritans in the English Civil War
