= Václav František Kocmánek =

Czech poet, author, and historian

Václav František Kocmánek (1607–1679) was a Baroque poet, writer, and historian of great synthesis from Bohemia.

After the White Mountain (1620 ), converted to Catholicism. Prakticky celý život působil jako učitel v Praze. Practically all his life he worked as a teacher in Prague.
