= Joseph Uziel =

Italian scholar and rabbi

Joseph Uziel (died 1572 in Ferrara) was an Italian scholar and rabbi. He was a pupil of Isaac Aboab of Castile, and left a responsum, which is included in the collection of Joseph di Trani (i. 39).
