= Samuel ben Joseph Uziel =

Samuel ben Joseph Uziel (16th–17th century) was a rabbi and physician of Spanish extraction who officiated as rabbi at Salonica, where he also practised medicine.
