= Samuel Uziel =

Italian Talmudist scholar and rabbi

Samuel Uziel was a Talmudist and scholar of the 17th century, rabbi of Livorno. He is mentioned in a responsum in the collection Mayim Rabbim of Raphael Meldola.
