= 1606 in poetry =

This article covers 1606 in poetry. Nationality words link to articles with information on the nation's poetry or literature (for instance, Irish or France).

== Works ==
=== English ===
- Samuel Daniel, The Queenes Arcadia: A pastoral tragecomedie
- John Davies, Bien Venu: Greate Britaines welcome to hir greate friendes, and deere breathren, the Danes
- Thomas Dekker, The Double PP: a Papist in Armes, published anonymously
- Michael Drayton's Poems Lyrick and Pastorall, including "The Ballad of Agincourt"
- John Ford, Fames Memoriall; or, The Earle of Devonshire Deceased, on the death of Charles Blount
- John Hind, Eliosto Libidinoso, contains some verse
- Philip Howard, Earl of Arundel, A Foure-Fould Meditation, of the Foure Last Things, also has been ascribed to Robert Southwell ("RS"), but The Concise Oxford Chronology of English Literature states Howard wrote it
- King James Version of the Bible
- Samuel Rowlands, A Terrible Battell Betweene the Two Consumers of the Whole World: Time and Death
- William Warner, A Continuance of Albions England, sixth edition, containing books xiv-xvi

=== Other languages ===
- Jean Passerat, Recueil des oeuvres poétiques de Ian Passerat augmenté de plus de la moitié, outre les précédentes impressions, edited by Jean de Rougevalet, Paris: Morel, published posthumously, France

== Births ==
- c. February 28 - Sir William Davenant (died 1668), English poet and playwright
- March 3 - Edmund Waller (died 1687), English poet and politician
- May 3 - Lorenzo Lippi (died 1664), Italian painter and poet
- Also:
  - Karacaoğlan (died 1680), Turkish folk poet and ashik
  - Johannes Khuen (died 1675), Bavarian priest, poet and composer
  - Junije Palmotić (died 1657), Ragusan dramatist and poet
  - Samarth Ramdas (died 1682), Indian Marathi saint and religious poet
  - Thomas Washbourne (died 1687), English clergyman and poet

== Deaths ==
- March 2 - Martin Moller (born 1547), German poet and mystic
- May 13 (bur.) - Arthur Golding (born 1535), English translator of prose and poetry
- May 22 - José de Sigüenza (born 1544), Spanish historian, poet and theologian
- September 2 - Karel van Mander (born 1548), Flemish-born Dutch painter and poet
- October 5 - Philippe Desportes (born 1546), French
- November 20 (bur.) - John Lyly (born 1553), English writer, dramatist and poet
- Also:
  - Baltasar del Alcázar (born 1530), Spanish
  - Simwnt Fychan (born 1535), Welsh language poet and genealogist
