= 1571 in poetry =

This article covers 1571 in poetry. Nationality words link to articles with information on the nation's poetry or literature (for instance, Irish or France).

== Works published ==
- John Barbour, publication year conjectural, The Brus, written 1376, posthumously published
- George Colclough, The Spectacle to Repentance
- Robert Henryson The Morall Fabillis of Esope the Phrygian, compylit in eloquent, & ornate scottis meter, translation in verse of Aesop's Fables, published in Edinburgh, Scotland; new edition of a work originally published in 1450; the title page states: "Newlie corectit, and vendicat, fra mony errouris, quhilkis war ouer sene in the last prenting, quhair baith Lynes, and haill versis war left owt. Inprinted att Edinburgh be me Thomas Bassandyne, dwelland at the nether bow (anno.) 1571"
- Edward de Vere, 17th Earl of Oxford:
  - "Letter to Bartholomew Clerke", a poem
  - "Letter to Bedingfield", a poem
- Jan van der Noot, Het Bosken

== Births ==
Death years link to the corresponding "[year] in poetry" article:

- Barnabe Barnes, baptised March 6; birth year disputed, 1568 and 1569 are also asserted (died 1609), English
- Trifone Bencio, flourished sometime after this year, Italian, Latin-language poet
- Judah Leone Modena, also known as Leon Modena or Yehudah Aryeh Mi-modena (died 1648), Venetian-born rabbi, orator, scholar, teacher and Hebrew-language poet
- Thomas Storer born about this year (died 1604), English

== Deaths ==
Birth years link to the corresponding "[year] in poetry" article:

- July 17 – Georg Fabricius (born 1516), German poet and historian
- November 24 – Jan Blahoslav (born 1523), Czech poet and translator
- date not known – Lodovico Castelvetro (born c. 1505), Italian literary critic

== See also ==
- Poetry
- 16th century in poetry
- 16th century in literature
- Dutch Renaissance and Golden Age literature
- Elizabethan literature
- French Renaissance literature
- Renaissance literature
- Spanish Renaissance literature
