= 1528 in poetry =

This article covers 1528 in poetry. Nationality words link to articles with information on the nation's poetry or literature (for instance, Irish or France).

== Works published ==
=== Great Britain ===
- Anonymous, The Jaeste of Syr Gawayne, publication year uncertain, Arthurian romance adapted from two episodes in the First continuation of Chretien de Troyes's Percival, ou le Conte del Graal
- William Barlowe and William Roy, Read Me and Be Not Wroth/ The Burial of the Mass
- John Skelton:
  - Diverse Ballads, publication year uncertain
  - A Replication

=== Other ===
- Giorgio Anselmo, Georgii Anselmi Nepotis, Epigrammaton Libri Septem; Sosthyrides Palladis Peples Aeglogue Quatuor, an octavo volume, Venice; Italian poet writing in Latin (see also, "Deaths", below)
- Anna Bijns, Refrains, Netherlands, first edition (subsequent editions in 1548 and 1567)
- Marcello Palingenio Stellato's Zodiacus vitae ("The Zodiac of Life"), Latin-language poem by an Italian (translated into English as The Zodiac of Life by Barnabe Googe, with parts published 1560 1561, 1565)

== Births ==
Death years link to the corresponding "[year] in poetry" article:

- November 2 – Petrus Lotichius Secundus, born Peter Lotz (died 1560), German scholar and Latin-language poet
- Rémy Belleau (died 1577), French
- Birbal, born Maheshdas Bhat (died 1586), Indian poet, wit and Grand Vizier of the Mughal court of Emperor Akbar
- Jean-Jacques Boissard (died 1602), French antiquary and Latin-language poet
- Henri Estienne (died 1598), French philologist, poet and humanist
- António Ferreira (died 1569), Portuguese
- Atagi Fuyuyasu (安宅 冬康) (died 1564), Japanese samurai and poet
- Phùng Khắc Khoan (died 1613), Vietnamese military strategist, politician, diplomat and poet

== Deaths ==
Birth years link to the corresponding "[year] in poetry" article:

- Giorgio Anselmo, (born 1458 or earlier), Italian physician and Latin-language poet; grandson of another Giogrio Anselmo, an Italian mathematician and astronomer (died 1440) (see also "Works", above)

== See also ==
- Poetry
- 16th century in poetry
- 16th century in literature
- French Renaissance literature
- Renaissance literature
- Spanish Renaissance literature
