= Tani Soyo =

Tani Sōyō (谷 宗養) (c. 1526–1563) was the son of Tani Sobuko. Sōyō was known as one of the most talented renga composers of his era. Being mainly known at being a rival of the famed composer, Satomura Joha, who was the leading master of the linked verse after Sōyō's death.
