= 1577 in poetry =

Nationality words link to articles with information on the nation's poetry or literature (for instance, Irish or France).

== Events ==
- December 4 – John of the Cross (Juan de Yepes) is imprisoned in Toledo, Spain. During his imprisonment he composes his Spiritual Canticle (Cántico Espiritual).

== Works published ==
=== Great Britain ===
- Nicholas Breton:
  - The Works of a Young Wit
  - A Flourish upon Fancy
- John Grange, The Golden Aphroditis, poetry and prose

=== Other ===
- Philippe Desportes, an edition of his works; France
- Guillaume Du Bartas, La Semaine, ou Création du Monde, France
- Eoghan O'Duffy, tr. by John O'Daly (1864), The Apostasy of Myler Magrath, Archbishop of Cashel, Cashel, County Tipperary. Composed as Irish bardic poetry in 1577.

== Births ==
- March – George Sandys (died 1644), English traveller, colonist and poet
- November 10 – Jacob Cats (died 1660), Dutch poet

== Deaths ==
- March 6 – Rémy Belleau (born 1528), French poet and member of La Pléiade
- April 21 – Girolamo Parabosco (born c. 1524), Italian poet and musician
- August 12 – Sir Thomas Smith (born 1513), English scholar, diplomat and poet
- October 7 – George Gascoigne (born c. 1535), English poet who died while a guest at George Whetstone's family manor of Walcot at Barnack, near Stamford, Lincolnshire; Whetstone commemorated his friend in a long elegy.
- Also:
  - Annibale Cruceio (born 1509), Italian, Latin-language poet

== See also ==
- Poetry
- 16th century in poetry
- 16th century in literature
- Dutch Renaissance and Golden Age literature
- Elizabethan literature
- French Renaissance literature
- Renaissance literature
- Spanish Renaissance literature
