= Jacob Uziel =

Jacob Uziel (died 1630 in Zante) was a physician and poet of the 17th century. He was of Spanish extraction, but emigrated to the Republic of Venice, where he became famous for his medical skill. He was the author of Dawid (Venice, 1624), an epic poem in twelve cantos, written in Italian.
