= Johannes Secundus =

16th century Neo-Latin Dutch poet

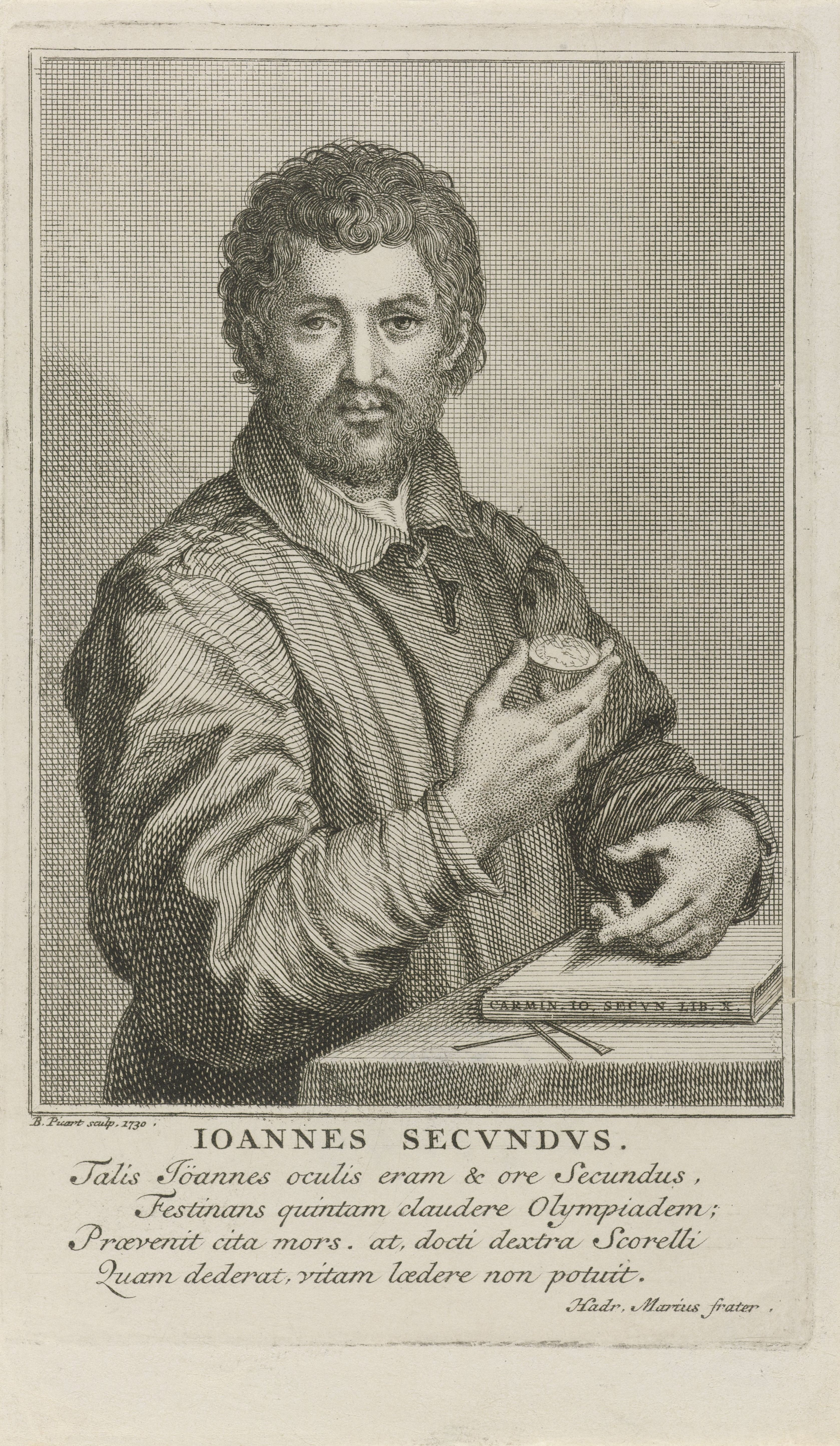
Janus Secundus

Johannes Secundus (also Janus Secundus) (15 November 1510 – 25 September 1536) was a Neo-Latin poet of Dutch nationality.

== Early life and education ==
Born Jan Everaerts in The Hague, his father Nicolaes Everaerts was a well known jurist and friend of Erasmus.

In 1528 his family moved to Mechlin, where Secundus wrote his first book of elegies. In 1532 he went to Bourges with his brother Marius to study law under Alciati. He obtained his licentia.

== Career ==
In 1533 he went to join his other brother Grudius at the Spanish court of Charles V. There he spent two years working as secretary to the Archbishop of Toledo. He returned to Mechlin because of illness, and died at Saint-Amand in September 1536 at the age of twenty-four.

== Writings ==
Secundus was a prolific writer, and in his short life he produced several books of elegies on his lovers Julia and Neaera, epigrams, odes, verse epistles and epithalamia, as well as some prose writings (epistles and itineraria).

His most famous work, though, was the Liber Basiorum (Book of Kisses, first complete edition 1541), a short collection consisting of nineteen poems in various metres, in which the poet explores the theme of the kiss in relation to his Spanish lover, Neaera. The 'Basia' are really extended imitations of Catullus (in particular poems 5 and 7) and some poems from the Anthologia Graeca; Secundus situates his poetry, stylistically as well as thematically, firmly with the Neo-Catullan tradition. Variations on the central theme include: imagery of natural fertility; the 'arithmetic' of kissing; kisses as nourishment or cure; kisses that wound or bring death; and the exchange of souls through kissing. Secundus also introduces elements of Neo-Platonism and Petrarchism into his poems.

== Musical settings and influence ==
- His poems were later set in Dutch translation as madrigals by Cornelis Tijmensz Padbrué (1631).
- Montaigne considered his Kisses the equivalent of Rabelais or The Decameron in terms of entertainment value.

== See also ==
- Ariosto
- Claudian
- Propertius
- Sannazaro
- Satyricon
