= Satomura Shōkyū =

Satomura Shōkyū (里村 昌休; 1510–1552) became the leading master of the linked verse renga after the death of Tani Sobuko in 1545. Before Sobuoko's death in 1545, Shokyu accepted the famous Jōha as a pupil during the year of 1544. During the year of 1552, Shokyu laid on his death bed, and entrusted Joho with the leadership of the Satomura school of renga and the care of his son Satomura Shoshitsu.
