= 1532 in poetry =

This article covers 1532 in poetry. Nationality words link to articles with information on the nation's poetry or literature (for instance, Irish or France).

== Works published ==
=== Great Britain ===
- Anonymous, Sir Lamwell, publication year uncertain but thought to be sometime from 1530 to this year; a version of an Authurian "fairy mistress" tale from Marie de France's Lai de Lanval, written in the second half of the 12th century
- Geoffrey Chaucer, The Works of Geffray Chauceur, edited by William Thynne (see also Woorks 1561, Workes 1598); Great Britain
- William Walter, Guistarde and Sigismonde, translation of Boccaccio's Decameron, Day 4, Tale 1, translated from a Latin version by Leonardo Bruni and edited by Robert Copland); Great Britain

=== Other ===
- Ludovico Ariosto, Orlando Furioso, first definitive version published; Italy
- Clément Marot, L’Adolescence clémentine, including many poems in formes fixes (ballades and rondeaux) as well as the long allegorical poem Le Temple de Cupidon; the author's first published collection; France
- Yamazaki Sōkan, editor, Shinseninutsukubashū, significant anthology of early Japanese haikai renga from which haiku later developed
- François Villon, Oeuvres ("Works"), first edition with commentary on the works by Clément Marot; France

== Births ==
Death years link to the corresponding "[year] in poetry" article:

- February 19 – Jean-Antoine de Baïf (died 1589), French poet and member of La Pléiade
- Lelio Bonzi (death year not known), Italian, Latin-language poet
- Étienne Jodelle (died 1573) French poet and playwright
- Dominicus Lampsonius (died 1599), Flemish humanist, poet and artist
- Georg List (died 1596), German
- Thomas Norton (died 1584), politician and poet
- Bartholomäus Ringwaldt year of death uncertain (died 1599), German
- (or 1497?) – Gosvāmī Tulsīdās तुलसीदास, also known as "Tulasī Dāsa" and "Tulsidas" (died 1623) Awadhi poet and philosopher

== Deaths ==
Birth years link to the corresponding "[year] in poetry" article:

- Juan del Encina died late this year or early 1533 (born 1468), Spanish poet, musician and playwright
- Andrzej Krzycki (born 1482), Polish archbishop, Latin prose writer and Polish-language poet often considered one of Poland's greatest humanist writers

== See also ==
- Poetry
- 16th century in poetry
- 16th century in literature
- French Renaissance literature
- Renaissance literature
- Spanish Renaissance literature
