= 1525 in poetry =

This article covers 1525 in poetry. Nationality words link to articles with information on the nation's poetry or literature (for instance, Irish or France).

== Works published ==
- Anonymous, King Alexander, publication year uncertain, written in the early 14th century; freely adapted from Thomas of Kent's Roman de toute chevalerie of the 12th century
- Pietro Bembo, Prose nelle quali si ragiona della volgar lingua (Prose della volgar lingua), the author's most influential work, a prose treatise on writing poetry in Italian; discussing verse composition in detail, including rhyme, stress, the sounds of words, balance and variety; criticism, Italy
- William Walter, Titus and Gesippus, publication year uncertain, translated from a Latin version of Boccaccio's Decameron, Day 10, Tale 8
- John Walton, The Consolation of Philosophy, translated from Boethius' The Consolation of Philosophy (see also Geoffrey Chaucer's translation of the same work, 1478 edition)
- Petrarch, edited by Allesandro Vellutello, Il Petrarco; the editor reordered the sequence of the "scattered" poems to reflect a narrative of Petrarch's life; the text would be reprinted 29 times in the 16th century; posthumous

== Births ==
Death years link to the corresponding "[year] in poetry" article:

- March 25 – Richard Edwardes, also spelled "Richard Edwards" (died 1566), English poet and playwright; a Gentleman of the Chapel Royal and master of the singing boys
- Pir Roshan (died 1582/1585), Pashtun warrior poet and intellectual also writing in Persian and Arabic
- Jan van Casembroot (died 1568), South Holland noble and poet
- Approximate date – Hans Wilhelm Kirchhof (died 1602), German Landsknecht, baroque poet and translator

== Deaths ==
Birth years link to the corresponding "[year] in poetry" article:

- May 27 – Thomas Müntzer (born c. 1489), German theologian and poet, executed
- Jean Lemaire de Belges died about this year (born c. 1473), Walloon poet and historian who lived primarily in France
- Cornelio Vitelli (born 1450), Italian, Latin-language poet

== See also ==
- Poetry
- 16th century in poetry
- 16th century in literature
- French Renaissance literature
- Renaissance literature
- Spanish Renaissance literature
