= Philippe Desportes =

French poet

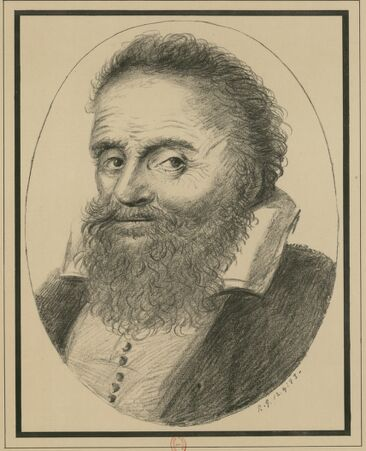
- Born: 1546; Chartres
- Died: 5 October 1606 (aged 59–60); Abbaye Notre-Dame de Bonport
- Writing career
- Genre: poetry

Philippe Desportes or Desports (1546 – 5 October 1606) was a French poet.

== Biography ==
Philippe Desportes was born in Chartres. While serving as secretary to the Bishop of Le Puy he visited Italy, where he learned Italian poetry. On his return to France he attached himself to the duke of Anjou, and followed him to Cracow on his election as king of Poland. Nine months in Poland satisfied the civilized Desportes, but in 1574 his patron became king of France as Henry III. He showered favours on the poet, who received, in reward for the skill with which he wrote occasional poems at the royal request, the abbey of Tiron and four other valuable benefices.

One example of the verse in which Desportes excelled is furnished by the villanelle with the refrain "Qui premier s'en repentira", which was on the lips of Henry, duke of Guise, just before his death. Desportes was above all an imitator; he imitated Petrarch, Ariosto, Sannazaro, and still more closely the minor Italian poets, and in 1604 a number of his plagiarisms were exposed in the Rencontres des Muses de France et d'Italie.

In his old age Desportes acknowledged his ecclesiastical preferment by a translation of the Psalms remembered chiefly for the brutal mot of Malherbe: "Votre potage vaut mieux que vos psaumes." He published in 1573 an edition of his works including Diane, Les Amours d'Hippolyte, Elegies, Bergeries, Œuvres chrêtiennes, etc.

An edition of his Œuvres, by Alfred Michiels, appeared in 1858.

== Tributes ==
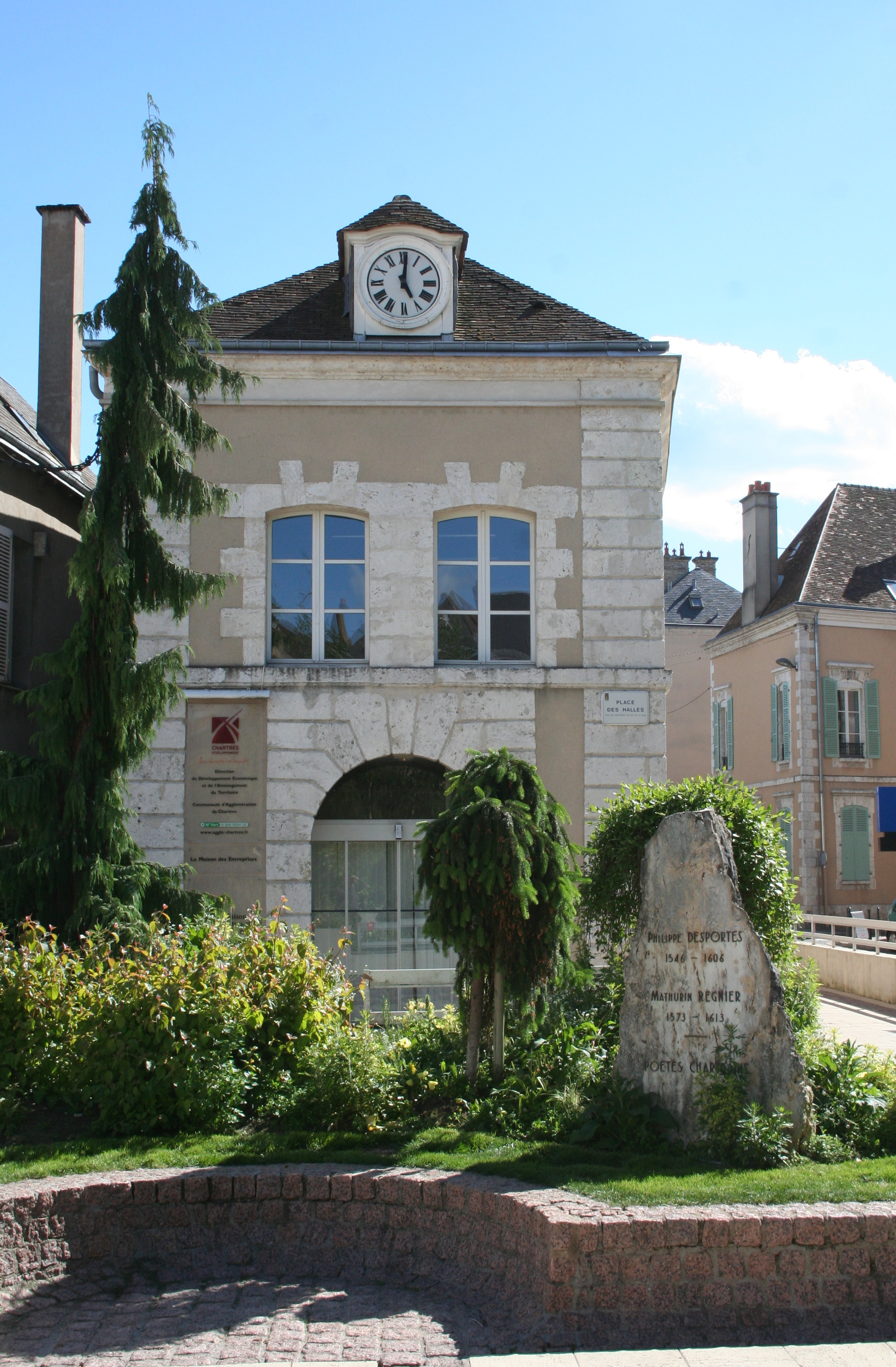
Stele, place des Halles, Chartres.

- His hometown, Chartres, pays homage to the poet by attributing to him the name of one of its roads, the rue Philippe-Desportes, which connects the street of Marshal Leclerc and that of Dr. Maunoury. In the Place des Halles, a stele is also erected in honor of the Chartrain poets Philipe Desportes and his nephew Mathurin Régnier.
