= William Walter (poet) =

William Walter (fl. 1520) was an English poet and translator. He is described on the title-pages of his books as "servaunt to Syr Henry Marney, knight, chaunceler of the duchy of Lancastre". Marney died in 1523, so it is probable that Walter's works were written earlier than is indicated by the date of publication of his first work. Possibly he is the Walter whose services in Paris were so useful to Thomas Lupset in 1528 (Letters and Papers, iv. 4022–3).

His works are:

1. Guystarde and Sygysmonde. "Here foloweth the amerous hystory of Guistarde and Sygysmonde and of theyr dolorous deth by her father, newly translated out of laten into englysshe by Wyllyam Walter, servaunt to Syr Henry Marney, knight, chaunceler of the duchy of Lancastre. Imprinted at London in Flete Strete at the sygne of the Sonne by Wynkyn de Worde. In the yere of our lords 1532." The poem was reprinted for the Roxburghe Club in 1818. It is written in seven-line stanzas, with occasional additional stanzas in the same metre inserted by Robert Copland by way of edifying comment. The Latin may be Leonardo Aretino's version of Giovanni Boccaccio's story. The poem is different from "The statelie Tragedy of Guistard and Sismond" which occurs in Certaine worthye Manuscript Poems of great Antiquitie . . . published by J. S., London, 1597; Edinburgh, 1812; but the metre is the same, and neither poem is directly from Boccaccio.
2. The Spectacle of Lovers. "Hereafter foloweth a lytell contravers dyalogue between love and councell with many goodly argumentes of good women and bad, very compendyous to all estates, newly compyled by William Walter, servaunt unto Syr Henry Marnaye, knyght, Chauncelour of the Duchy of Lancastre. Imprynted at London in Flete Strete at the sygne of the Sonne by me, Wynkyn de Worde." There is a short account of this poem, which is apparently a translation, in John Payne Collier's Bibliographical Account of Early English Literature (ii. 378, 482).
3. Tytus and Gesyppus. "Here begynneth the hystory of Tytus and Gesyppus translated out of latyn in to englyshe by Wyllyam Walter, sometymeservante to Syr Henry Marney, knyght, chaunceler of the duchy of Lancastre. Emprynted at London in the Flete Strete at the sygne of the Sonne by me, Wynkyn de Worde." The poem is described in Dibdin's edition of Typographical Antiquities by Joseph Ames, as prepared by William Herbert.
