= Women in Type =

Defunct research project

Women in Type was a three-year research project funded by the Leverhulme Trust and led by the Department of Typography & Graphic Communication at the University of Reading. The project aimed to give a sociohistorical account of the role and responsibilities of women in two type-drawing offices in the years 1910-1990. The study uncovered details of women’s pivotal role in the type design process and gives credit for their skilled work in the production of such well-known fonts as Arial, Gill Sans and Centaur, whose development is usually solely attributed to a male colleague or superior.

== Background to the study ==
The Type Archive was founded in 1992 by Susan Shaw in Stockwell, South London.

In the early 1990s, women worked in the printing industry in departments sometimes known as drawing studios, type drawing offices, or departments of typographic development. They worked together on developing and producing typefaces that were each usually attributed to a male designer. In order to unearth the careers of these overlooked women type face designers, it was decided to undertake research into their lives and careers. In 2016, a pilot study was made to establish the availability of archival records, and of key personnel for interviews, connected to two companies: the Monotype Corporation and Linotype Limited (formerly Linotype-Paul Ltd and Linotype-Hell Ltd). The scope of the study and the appropriateness of the research methodology were considered.

== Research team ==
The project was led by Fiona Ross, a specialist in type design, with principal researcher Alice Savoie, a typeface designer and lecturer, and post-doctoral assistant Helena Lekka, an independent graphic designer.

== The main study ==
Between March 2018 and November 2021, using archived company job logs, diaries, interviews, and the examination of technical drawings and typeface proofs, it was established that in the early 1900s, Monotype and Linotype predominantly employed young women in their typeface design offices. The women were often recruited as school leavers, worked for a few years and then, typically left to start their families. They worked to create typefaces from the original drawings of a designer. Some women however worked for many years in design offices which were increasingly run by women. They built expertise, and developed fonts which are well known and widely used today. Particular individuals whose contributions to the type design process have been overlooked are Dora Laing, Dora Pritchett, and Patricia Saunders. Once the research phase of the project had ended in 2021, an interactive website was launched at women-in-type.com. Insights from the data collected in the project were then also presented in follow up lecture series and symposia.

== Publications ==
The following publications resulted from the project:

- (2020) Savoie, A. 'The women behind Times New Roman: The contribution of type drawing offices to twentieth century type-making'
- (2021) Savoie, A. and Ross, F. 'Dora Pritchett, Dora Laing, Patricia Saunders…the invisible women of Monotype’s Type Drawing Office'
- (2026) Ross, F and A. Savoie '28 Women in Type: Investigating Women’s Role in Type Drawing Offices, 1910–1990'

== Follow up ==
In 2024, the Klingspor Museum held an exhibition exploring women’s roles in 20th-century type history. The exhibition catalogue featured contributions from Alice Savoie and Fiona Ross.

From 2026 onwards, the original research team have continued to maintain the technical drawings, typeface proofs, and documented histories of pivotal women on the official website. The research project has also inspired several further initiatives in the type design community.
