= Hackford =

Hackford may refer to:

== People ==
- Taylor Hackford (born 1944), American film director
- Rio Hackford (1970–2022), American film and television actor
- Bryce Hackford, American musician
- Antwoine Hackford (born 2004), English professional footballer
- David Hackford (born 1964), British windsurfer

== Places in England ==
- Hackford, Broadland, near Reepham, Norfolk
- Hackford, South Norfolk, near Hingham, Norfolk
- Hackford Road, road in Oval, Lambeth, South London

== Arts ==
- 87 Hackford Road (Van Gogh), first known work of Vincent van Gogh
