= Harry Lawrence (disambiguation) =

Harry Lawrence was a South African politician.

Harry Lawrence may also refer to:

- Harry Lawrence, publisher of The Reporter (Belize)
- Harry Lawrence (American football) (c. 1909 – 1987), American football coach
- Harry Lawrence (curler) in 1983 Labatt Brier

== See also ==
- Harry Lawrence Bradfer-Lawrence (1887–1965), antiquarian
- Harold Lawrence (1887–?), politician in Manitoba, Canada
- Henry Lawrence (disambiguation)
