= William Bolland =

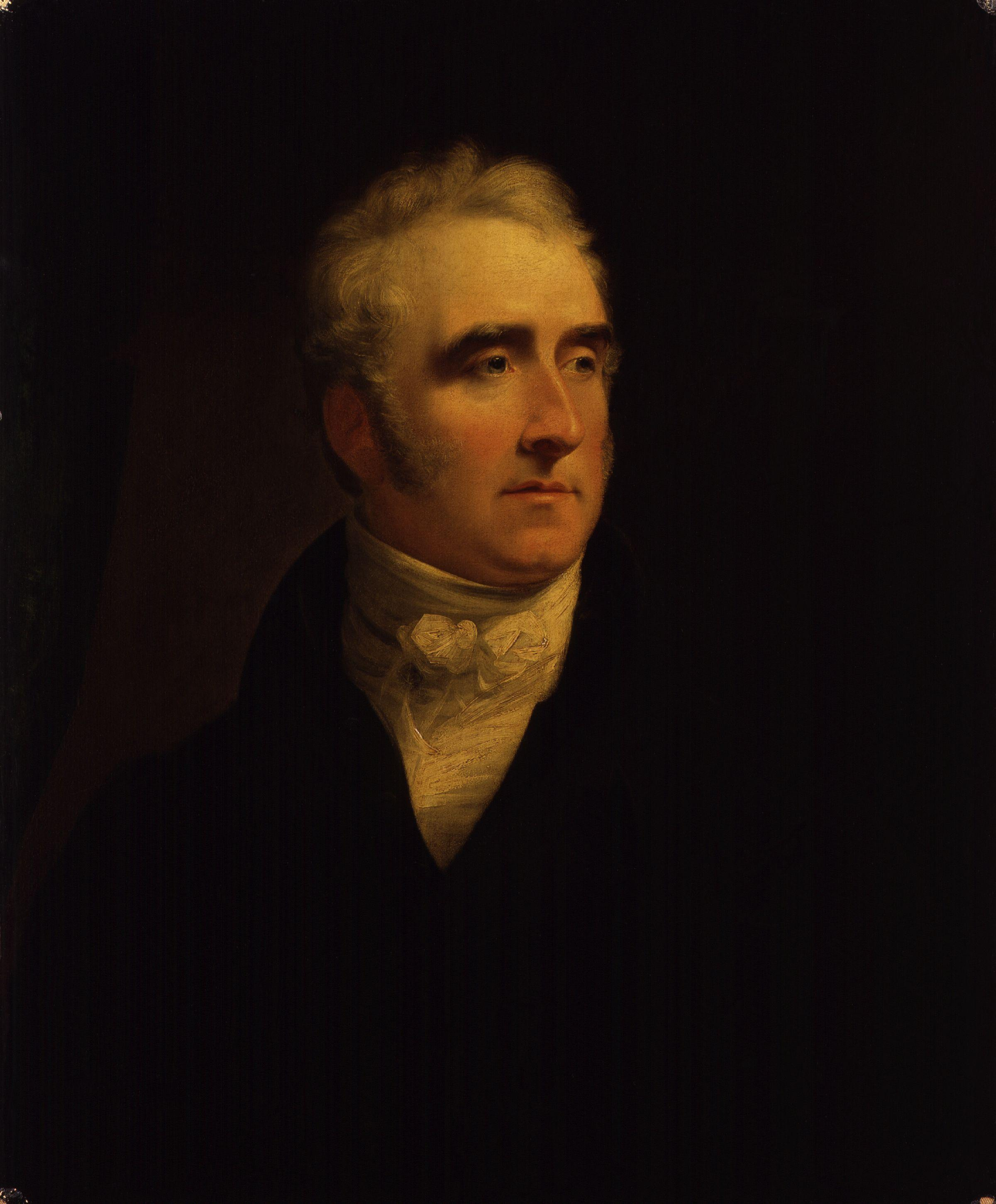
Portrait (1827) of Sir William Bolland by James Lonsdale

Sir William Bolland (1772–1840), lawyer and bibliophile, the eldest son of James Bolland, of Southwark, was educated at Reading School under Richard Valpy, and admitted a pensioner at Trinity College, Cambridge on 26 September 1789, at the age of seventeen. During his school days he wrote several prologues and epilogues for the annual dramatic performances in which the scholars took part, and for which Valpy's pupils were famous. At Cambridge he took his degree of BA in 1794, and MA in 1797. For three successive years (1797, 1798, and 1799) he won the Seatonian Prize by his poems on the respective subjects of miracles, the Epiphany, and St Paul at Athens, which were printed separately, and also included in the Seatonian Prize Poems (1808), ii. 2133-97.

Bolland adopted law as his profession and was called to the bar at the Middle Temple on 24 April 1801. Bolland practised at the Old Bailey with great success; he was thoroughly conversant with commercial law and soon became one of the four city pleaders. From April 1817 until he was raised to the bench he was recorder of Reading. He was a candidate for Common Serjeant of London in 1822, but in those days of heated political excitement was defeated by the Lord Denman. In November 1829 he was created a Baron of the Exchequer, and held that appointment until January 1839, when he resigned on account of failing health.

On 14 May 1840 he died at Hyde Park Terrace, London. On 1 August 1810, he had married his cousin Elizabeth, the third daughter of John Bolland, of Clapham.

== Works and library ==
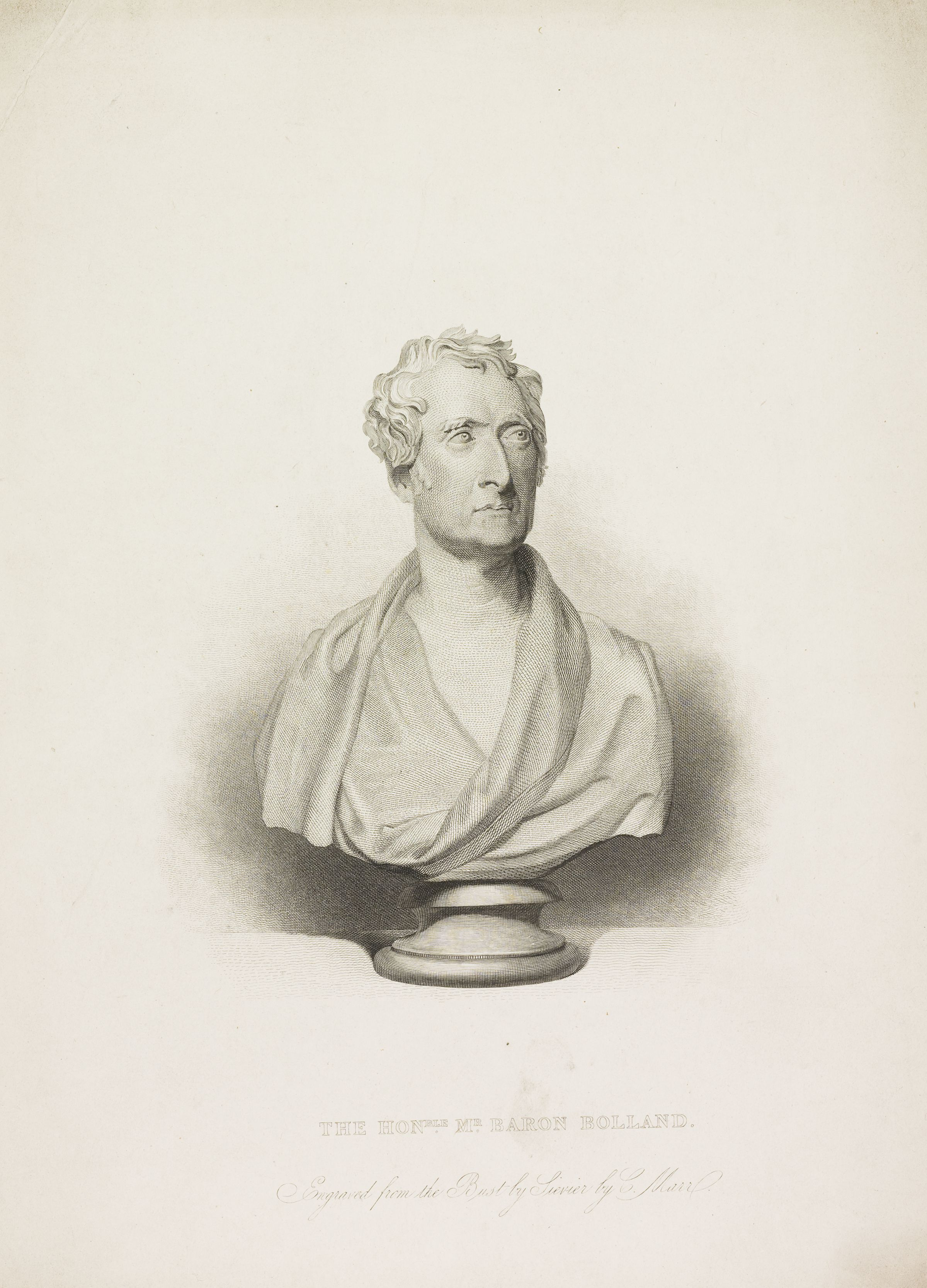
Engraving of marble bust (1830) of Baron Bolland by Robert William Sievier

An anonymous satire, "The Campaign, to his Royal Highness the Duke of York, Britannia in the year 1800 to C. J. Fox." was written by Bolland in 1800, but not issued for sale, the author confining its publicity to his friends. Although he published but little, he was known for many years as an enthusiastic student of early English literature. Thomas Frognall Dibdin dwells with unction on the pleasures of the dinner-parties of Hortensius—the fancy name by which he designated Sir William Bolland—and extols the merits of his library. It was at a dinner-party in Bolland’s house on the Adelphi Terrace that the Roxburghe Club was originated, and its first publication was his gift. This was Certain Bokes of Virgiles Aenæis turned into English meter. By the right honorable lorde, Henry, earle of Surrey. The translated books of the Aeneid were the second and fourth, and the reprint, bearing the date of 1814, though the dedication was signed 17 June 1815, was taken from a copy of the original edition of 1557, which is preserved at Dulwich College. His collections were sold in the autumn after his death, his library of about three thousand articles producing about £3,000.

A portrait by James Lonsdale is in the National Portrait Gallery. The bust of Bolland by Robert William Sievier was placed in the Wren Library of Trinity College, Cambridge.
