= Bibliomania =

Obsessive–compulsive collection of books

External videos
- Booknotes interview with Nicholas Basbanes on A Gentle Madness, October 15, 1995, C-SPAN

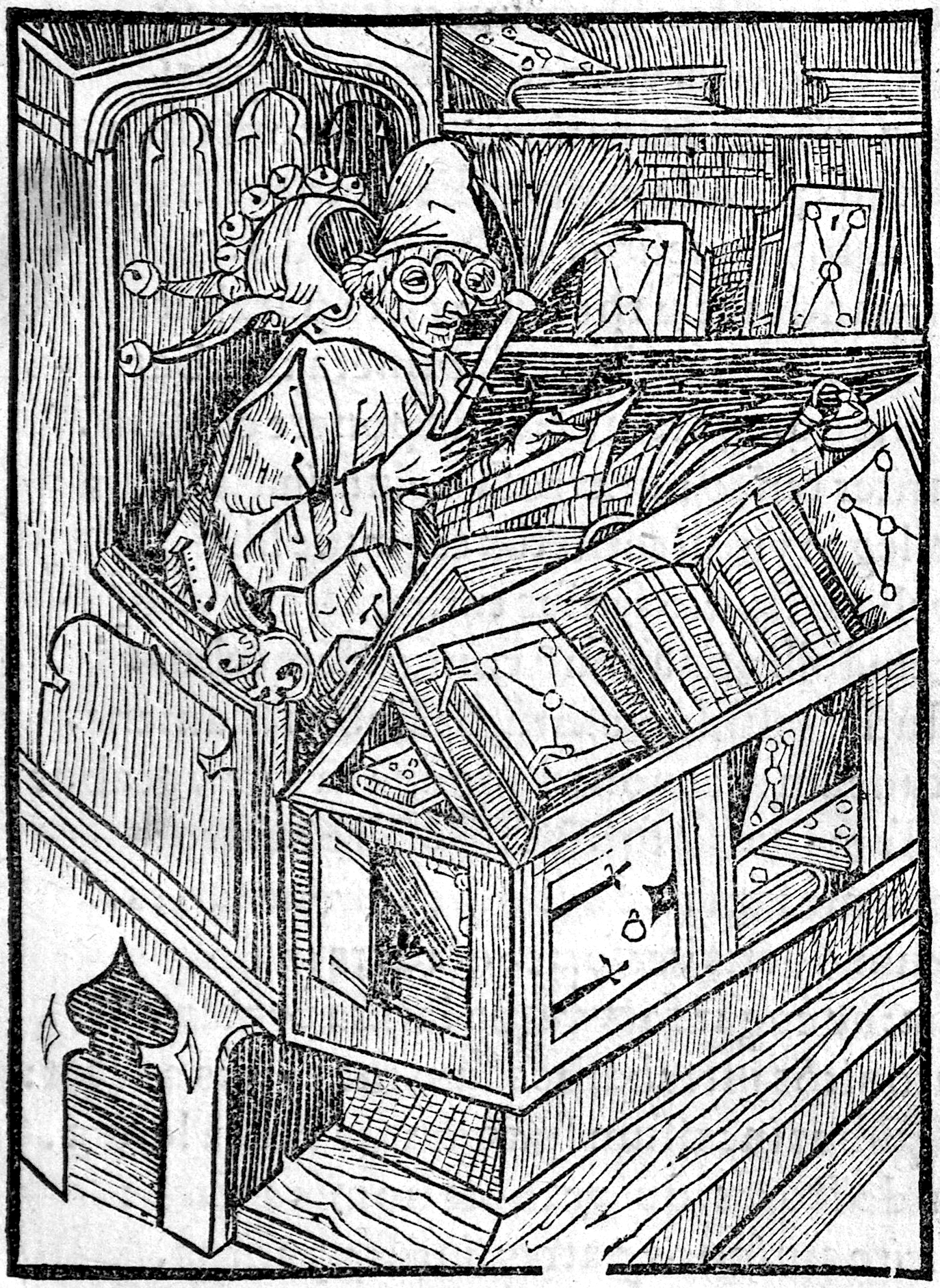
Engraving titled The Bibliomaniac from Navis Stultifera (The Ship of Fools) by Sebastian Brandt, 1497.

Bibliomania is the excessive collecting or even hoarding of books to the point where social relations or health are damaged, particularly as a symptom of obsessive–compulsive disorder.

Bibliomania is not to be confused with bibliophilia, which is the (psychologically healthy) love of books, and as such is not considered a clinical psychological disorder.

== Description ==
One of several unusual behaviors associated with books, bibliomania is characterized by the collecting of books which have no use to the collector nor any great intrinsic value to a genuine book collector. The purchase of multiple copies of the same book and edition and the accumulation of books beyond possible capacity of use or enjoyment are frequent symptoms of bibliomania. Bibliomania is a psychological disorder recognized by the American Psychiatric Association in its DSM-IV.

Bibliomaniacs are characterized as those who are obsessed with books so much so that they will go to extreme measures to obtain the books they want. Often bibliomaniacs will have multiple copies of the same book in different editions and varying conditions. Bibliomaniacs affect the buying and selling of books with their obsessive nature and have greatly increased the price of buying rare books.

== History ==
The term was coined by John Ferriar (1761–1815), a physician at the Manchester Royal Infirmary. Ferriar coined the term in 1809 in a poem he dedicated to his bibliomanic friend, Richard Heber (1773–1833). In the early nineteenth century, "bibliomania" was used in popular discourse (such as in periodical essays and poems) to describe obsessive book collectors.

In 1809, the Reverend Thomas Frognall Dibdin published Bibliomania; or Book Madness, a work described by literary critic Philip Connell as "a series of bizarre rambling dialogues which together comprised a kind of dramatized mock pathology, lavishly illustrated and, in the second edition, embellished with extensive footnotes on bibliography and the history of book collecting." The "symptoms" displayed by the bibliomaniacs in Dibdin's work include "an obsession with uncut copies, fine paper or vellum pages, unique copies, first editions, blackletter books, illustrated copies, association copies, and condemned or suppressed works".

In the late nineteenth century, book collections and collectors of note were given regular coverage as curiosities.

Holbrook Jackson was to follow the work of Ferriar and Dibdin later in the work The Anatomy of Bibliomania.

Bibliomania became quite popular during the Regency era as the desire for first edition copies of books drove prices to unobtainable levels. Because of this, bibliomaniacs made a significant impact on the sales of rare or older books in such a way that it has never truly recovered.

== People with bibliomania ==
- Stephen Blumberg, who was convicted of stealing $5.3 million worth of books.
- Sir Thomas Phillipps, 1st Baronet (1792–1872) suffered from severe bibliomania. His collection, which at his death contained over 160,000 books and manuscripts, was still being auctioned off over 100 years after his death.
- Rev. W.F. Whitcher was a 19th-century Methodist pastor who, after having stolen and rebound rare books, would assert they were rare "finds" from local booksellers.
- Lord Charles Spencer (1740–1820), a book collector who drove the bidding for a first edition copy of The Decameron to £2,260 at the auction of the family library of Roxburghe.

== See also ==
- Tsundoku
- Book collecting
- Compulsive behavior
- Mania
- Book store shoplifting
