= Nicolas Barker =

British historian of printing and books (born 1932)

Nicolas Barker OBE FBA FSA
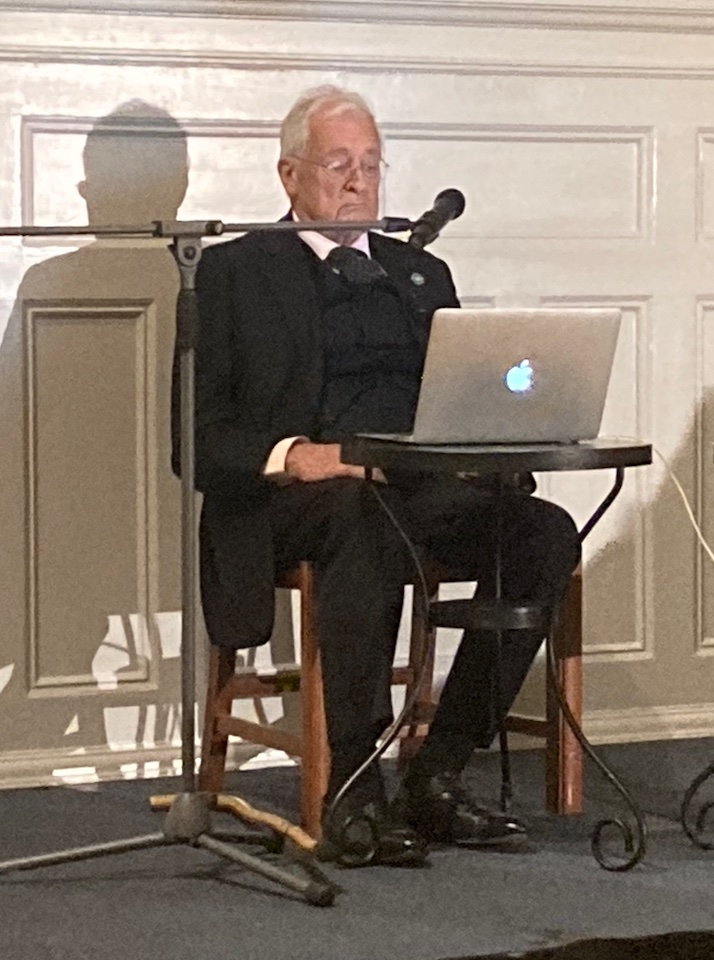
- Barker preparing to give the Beatrice Warde Memorial Lecture, November 2022
- Born: Nicolas John Barker; 1932 (age 93–94)
- Occupations: Historian of printing and books

Nicolas John Barker OBE FBA FSA (born 1932) is a British historian of printing and books. He was Head of Conservation at the British Library from 1976 to 1992.

Barker was editor of The Book Collector from 1965 to 2016 and edited The Pleasures of Bibliophily: Fifty Years of the Book Collector, an Anthology.

He was elected to the Roxburghe Club in 1970. In 2000, The Great Book of Thomas Trevilian. A Facsimile from the manuscript in the Wormsley Library. With a Study by Nicolas Barker was published for presentation to his fellow members of the Roxburghe Club. It was printed in red and black by Susan Shaw at the Merrion Press. Sir Paul Getty commissioned the reproduction.

Barker was elected a Fellow of the British Academy in 1998, and is also a Fellow of the Society of Antiquaries of London. He held the Sandars Readership in Bibliography in 1999–2000 and lectured on "Type and type-founding in Britain 1485–1720".

In 2002, he was appointed an Officer of the Order of the British Empire (OBE).

Barker gave the 2002 Panizzi Lecture at the British Library and was the A.S.W. Rosenbach Fellow at the University of Pennsylvania in 2002.

A bibliography of his work was published to mark his 80th birthday in 2012.

In November 2022, Barker delivered the Beatrice Warde Memorial Lecture at the St Bride Foundation.

== Selected works ==
- Barker, Nicolas. 1964. The Publications of the Roxburghe Club, 1814–1962. an Essay with a Bibliographical Table. Cambridge: Printed for presentation to members of the Roxburghe Club.
- Barker, Nicolas. 1968. "The Book as Artefact". The Book Collector 17 (no. 2), Summer: 143–150.
- Barker, Nicolas (1972). Stanley Morison. London: Macmillan.
- Barker, Nicolas, 1976. "Caxton's Quincentenary: Retrospect". The Book Collector 25 (no. 4), Winter: 455–480.
- Barker, Nicolas (1978). Bibliotheca Lindesiana: the Lives and Collections of Alexander William, 25th Earl of Crawford and 8th Earl of Balcarres, and James Ludovic, 26th Earl of Crawford and 9th Earl of Balcarres. London: for Presentation to the Roxburghe Club, and published by Bernard Quaritch
- Barker, Nicolas (1978). The Oxford University Press and the Spread of Learning, 1478–1978: An Illustrated History. Oxford England: Clarendon Press.
- Barker, Nicolas. (1985). "Libraries and the National Heritage: Two Views from Europe". The Book Collector 34 (no. 2): Summer: 145–172.
- Barker, Nicolas (1987). The Butterfly Books. An Enquiry into the Nature of Certain Twentieth Century Pamphlets. London: Bertram Rota.
- Barker, Nicolas (1988). Two East Anglian Picture Books.
- Barker, Nicolas (1989). Treasures of the British Library; compiled by Nicolas Barker and the curatorial staff of the British Library. New York: Harry N. Abrams ISBN 0-8109-1653-3
- Barker, Nicholas (1992). "The Author as Editor". The Book Collector 41 (no. 1), Spring: 9–27.
- Barker, Nicolas, and British Library (1993). A Potencie of Life : Books in Society : The Clark Lectures 1986–1987. London: British Library.
- Barker, Nicolas, and Basilius Besler. 1994. Hortus Eystettensis: The Bishop’s Garden and Besler's Magnificent Book. New York: H.N. Abrams.
- Barker, Nicolas. Grolier Club, Royal Oak Foundation, and Stinehour Press. (1999). Treasures from the Libraries of National Trust Country Houses. New York: Royal Oak Foundation & The Grolier Club.
- Barker, Nicolas (2000). The Great Book of Thomas Trevilian: A Facsimile of the Manuscript in the Wormsley Library. London: Published by Susan Shaw for presentation to the members of the Roxburghe Club.
- Barker, Nicolas Barker (2002). "Fifty Years On" (fifty years of The Book Collector). The Book Collector 51 (no. 4): Winter: 481–489.
- Barker, Nicolas (2003). Form and Meaning in the History of the Book. Selected Essays by Nicolas Barker. London: British Library.
- Barker, Nicolas (2003). The Pleasures of Bibliophily: Fifty Years of the Book Collector, an Anthology. Edited by Nicolas J. Barker. London: British Library; New Castle, Del.: Oak Knoll Press, 2003.
- John Carter; Nicolas Barker (2004). ABC for Book Collectors (8th ed.). Oak Knoll Press. ISBN 1584561122.
- Barker, Nicolas, and British Library (2005). Treasures of the British Library. London: British Library.
- Barker, Nicolas, "Introduction" in Cronenwett, Philip N., Kevin Osborn, and Samuel Allen Streit. 2007. Celebrating Research : Rare and Special Collections from the Membership of the Association of Research Libraries. Washington, DC: Association of Research Libraries.
- Barker, Nicolas. "Preface" in Wendorf, Richard. 2007. America’s Membership Libraries. 1st edn. New Castle, DE: Oak Knoll Press.
- Barker, Nicolas (2012). The Roxburghe Club: a bicentenary history. Cambridge: Roxburghe Club.
- Barker, Nicolas (2016). Visible Voices : Translating Verse into Script & Print, 3000 BC–AD 2000. 2016. Manchester: Carcanet.
- Barker, Nicolas (2019). At First, All Went Well ...: And Other Brief Lives. London: Bernard Quaritch.
- Barker, Nicolas (2019). The Pirie Library: A Short-Title Catalogue of the Collection of Robert S. Pirie: With Indexes of Provenances, Sources, Bindings, Armorials and Devices & a List of Prices. London: Bernard Quaritch.
- Barker, Nicolas (2020). Reginald Heber: A Letter from India.
