= William Norris (antiquarian) =

English clergyman and antiquarian

William Norris (1719–1791) was an English clergyman and antiquarian.

== Life ==
He was brother to Robert Norris. He was elected Fellow of the Society of Antiquaries on 4 April 1754, and that year began to assist Joseph Ames as secretary to the society. On Ames's death, in 1759, Norris became sole secretary, and held the post as an effective official until 1786, when he retired on account of ill-health.

He was for several years corrector for the press to Thomas Baskett, the royal printer. He died in Camden Street, Islington, in November 1791, and was buried in the burial-ground of St James, Pentonville, on 29 November.
