= Bibliomania (book) =

1809 book by Thomas Frognall Dibdin

Bibliomania; or Book Madness was first published in 1809 by the Reverend Thomas Frognall Dibdin (1776–1847). Written in the form of fictional dialogues from bibliophiles, it purports to outline a malady called bibliomania.

Title page to the 1842 edition.

Dibdin was trained and practiced as an Anglican clergyman. The founder of the Roxburghe Club of book lovers, unofficial librarian of the Spencer collection, and a flawed but prolific bibliographer, Dibdin was perhaps the genesis behind the bibliophilic neurosis that afflicted the British upper classes in the Romantic period. His Bibliomania; or Book Madness was first published in 1809, as a series of dialogues which together comprised a kind of dramatized mock pathology, lavishly illustrated and, in the second edition, embellished with extensive footnotes on bibliography and the history of book collecting. The "symptoms" exhibited by the various characters in Dibdin's eccentric book, common enough amongst the affluent collectors of his acquaintance, included an obsession with uncut copies, fine paper or vellum pages, unique copies, first editions, black letter books, illustrated copies, association copies, and condemned or suppressed works. Bibliomania's imaginary conversations made a gentle mockery of Dibdin's aristocratic patrons and fellow collectors.

== 1809 edition ==
The mock-heroic Bibliomania; or Book Madness,“excit[ed] a general curiosity in rare and precious volumes” upon its appearance (272). Dibdin also speaks of the book’s impact on the Roxburghe sale’s prices: “[T]here can be no doubt of the [Bibliomania’s] having been largely instrumental to the increase of the prices of this sale” (336). The book was in fact well known. His bestselling production, it continues to be the work by which Dibdin is best remembered. New editions appeared in 1811, 1842, 1856, 1876, and 1903, and the subscription list for the 1809 edition includes King George III, 233 others and 18 libraries.

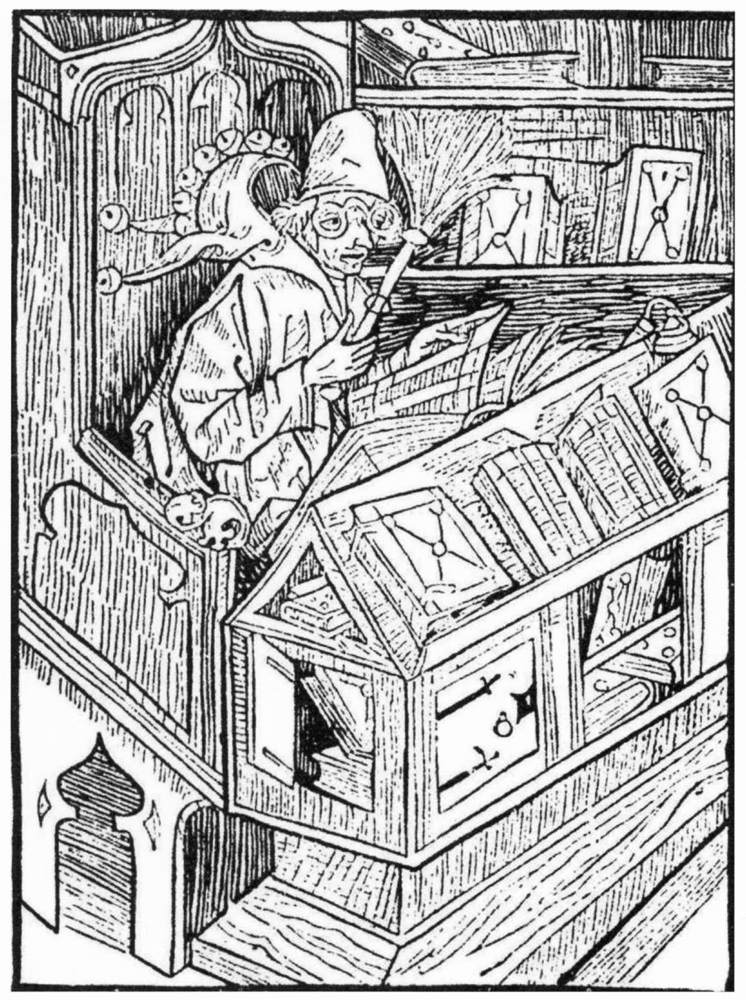
The Book Fool, a 1494 woodcut by Sebastian Brant, was published in the 1809 edition

== 1811 "edition" ==
The 1811 version of The Bibliomania or Book Madness, is actually a revision of the first and the version that brought Dibdin into public notice. This second version, while often conflated with the first, is a vastly different work. The 1809 Bibliomania is a slim mock treatise of about 80 pages purporting to diagnose and to cure the "book-disease" (even as it gives every evidence of having succumbed to the disease itself), so that it fits into the genre of literary satire. The 1811 Bibliomania, on the other hand, has not only swelled to almost 800 pages, but has turned into a peculiar generic hybrid Dibdin terms "bibliographical romance." Bibliomania; or Book Madness; A Bibliographical Romance, in Six Parts (1811) consists of dialogues on books and book-collecting conducted by a set of male characters (many based on Dibdin's actual friends), two of whom court shadowy female figures in the intervals between their more intense romancing of books.

== Influence ==
While it is a fictional work, many of the characters are modeled after Dibdin’s own friends and acquaintances. Later editions are “dedicated” to Richard Heber, one of the age’s most incurable bibliophiles.

Bibliomania was spreading as private collectors sparred in auction houses like “Book-Knights”, no doubt spurred on by the book's growing popularity. One such famous duel, said to be directly influenced by the book Bibliomania, was witnessed by Dibdin in 1812 at the Roxburghe sale. This auction lasted for forty-two consecutive days (excluding Sundays) as a trio of collectors vied for choice selections and one unique book, a Valdarfer Boccaccio, wanted even by the Emperor Napoleon himself. Silence filled the room as each of the collectors upped the price in an aristocratic bidding war. Finally it was down to two: Lord Spencer, Dibdin’s employer, and the Marquis of Blandford. The price stood at two thousand pounds when Lord Spencer bid an additional £250. As was his strategy throughout the contest, Blandford raised it an additional ten pounds which put the contest to an end. This would be the highest price ever paid for a book until J. P. Morgan purchased Mainz Psalter for $24,750 in 1884. While Lord Spencer may have lost on that day, he would soon have the last laugh when a bankrupt Blandford would be forced to sell Lord Spencer the book for a mere £918.

== Later works ==
Dibdin's work in the early part of the nineteenth century was followed by Holbrook Jackson's The Anatomy of Bibliomania in the early part of the twentieth century where Bibliomania continued as an obsession for wealthy collectors.

== Contents (1842 edition) ==
PART I. THE EVENING WALK. On the right uses of Literature

II. THE CABINET. Outline of Foreign and Domestic Bibliography

III. THE AUCTION-ROOM. Character of Orlando. Of ancient Prices of Books, and of Book-Binding. Book-Auction Bibliomaniacs.

IV. THE LIBRARY. Dr. Henry's History of Great Britain. A Game at Chess. Of Monachism and Chivalry. Dinner at Lorenzo's. Some Account of Book Collectors in England.

V. THE DRAWING ROOM. History of the Bibliomania, or Account of Book Collectors, concluded.

VI. THE ALCOVE. Symptoms of the Disease called the Bibliomania. Probable Means of its Cure.

SUPPLEMENT

CHRONOLOGICAL INDEX

BIBLIOGRAPHICAL INDEX

GENERAL INDEX
