= Robert S. Pirie =

American lawyer

Robert S Pirie (8 May 1934 – 15 January 2015) was an American lawyer.

Pirie was born in Chicago. He attended Buckley School in New York City and Hotchkiss School in Connecticut. He graduated from Harvard College and Harvard Law School. As an undergraduate he was attracted to bibliographical work in Elizabethan authors and began to collect actively in the late 1950s while a lieutenant in the United States Army stationed in Germany.

During the 1960s and early 1970s Pirie was associated with law firms in Boston. His work for the Harold Hughes election campaign during this time landed him on the master list of Nixon political opponents.

He later practiced in New York City and then served in turn as Co-Chairman and CEO of Rothschild, North America, Senior Managing Director of Bear Stearns & Co., and Vice-Chairman of Investment Banking at SG Cowen Securities Corporation. He died at the age of 80 in New York City in January 2015.

Pirie's extensive collection of rare books and manuscripts was auctioned by Sotheby's on December 2–4, 2015. In 2019 Nicolas Barker compiled The Pirie Library: A Short-Title Catalogue of the Collection of Robert S Pirie which was published by Bernard Quaritch, Ltd.
