= Roxburghe Club =

Bibliographic and publishing society in the United Kingdom

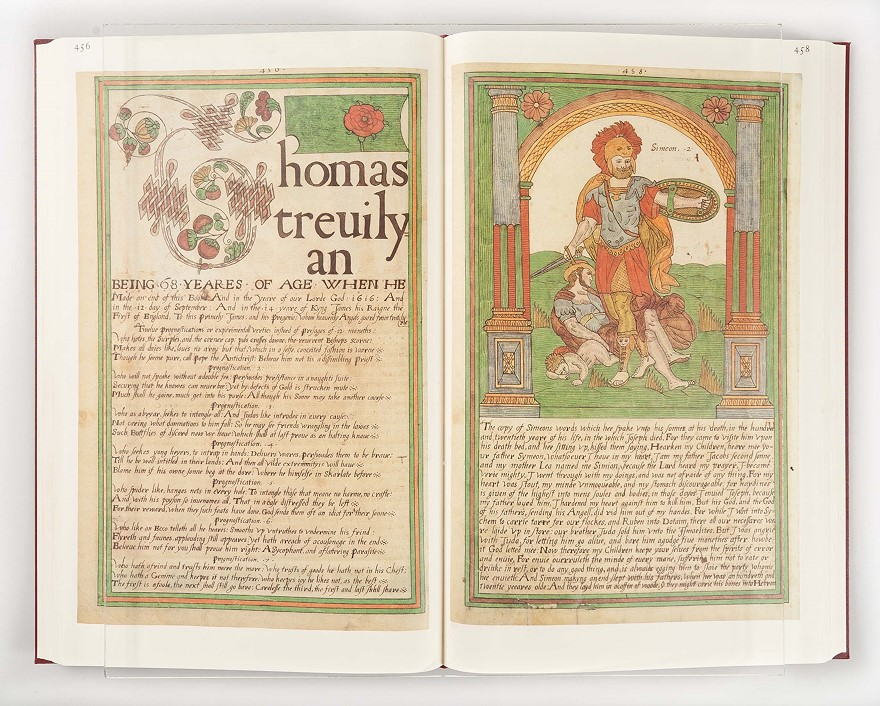
The Great Book of Thomas Trevilian, a facsimile of a manuscript of 1616, published for the Roxburghe Club in 2000

The Roxburghe Club (founded in London in 1812) is a bibliophilic and publishing society based in the United Kingdom.

== Origins ==
The spur to the Club's foundation was the sale of the enormous library of John Ker, 3rd Duke of Roxburghe (who had died in 1804), which took place over 46 days in May–July 1812. The auction was eagerly followed by bibliophiles, the high point being the sale on 17 June 1812 of the first dated edition of Boccaccio's Decameron, printed by Christophorus Valdarfer at Venice in 1471, and sold to the Marquis of Blandford for £2,260, the highest price ever given for a book at that time. (The Marquis already possessed a copy, but one that lacked 5 pages.) That evening, a group of eighteen collectors met at the St Albans Tavern, St Albans Street (later renamed Waterloo Place) for a dinner presided over by George Spencer, 2nd Earl Spencer, and this is regarded as the origin of the Roxburghe Club.

A toast drunk on that occasion has been repeated at every annual anniversary dinner since to the "immortal memory of John Duke of Roxburghe, of Christopher Valdarfer, printer of the Boccaccio of 1471, of Gutenberg, Fust and Schoeffer, the inventors of the art of printing, of William Caxton, Father of the British press [and others; and] the prosperity of the Roxburghe Club and the Cause of Bibliomania all over the world". It was decided to make the dinner an annual event: further members were admitted the following year. The club was formed by Thomas Frognall Dibdin, author of the book Bibliomania; or Book-Madness (1809), who served as its first secretary; and the club was formalised under Earl Spencer's presidency.

== Membership ==
The Club has had a total of 350 members from its foundation to 2017. The circle has always been an exclusive one, with just one "black ball" (negative vote) being enough to exclude an applicant. Since 1839 the number of members at any one time has been limited to forty.

A photograph exists of the membership in 1892, including the Prime Minister Arthur Balfour and anthropologist Andrew Lang, as well as American poet James Russell Lowell, Alfred Henry Huth, and Simon Watson Taylor. James Gascoyne-Cecil, Viscount Cranborne, was then President.

The first female member was Mary, Viscountess Eccles, elected in 1985. In 2011, the Australian comedian Barry Humphries was elected a member. The President since 1998 has been Max Egremont.

== Publications ==
The Club rapidly became more than a mere social institution. Each member was (and remains) expected to sponsor the publication of a rare or curious volume. Other volumes are published by the Club collectively. Initially the volumes were editions of early blackletter printed texts (the first, in 1814, was the Earl of Surrey's translation of parts of Virgil's Aeneid, originally printed in 1557); but from as early as 1819 they began to include texts taken from manuscript originals. The standards of scholarship are high, and the quality of printing, facsimile reproduction, and binding is lavish. Copies of each volume (in a fine binding) are presented to all members, and a limited number of extra copies (generally in a less lavish binding) may be made available for sale to non-members. From 1839, the total number of copies for each publication, including members' copies, was limited to 100. Recently, the limit was raised to 342 copies: 42 for the club, 300 for the public. The Roxburghe Club is generally recognised as the first "book club" (that is, text publication society), and was a model for many book societies that appeared later in Britain and Europe.

In 2000 the publisher Susan Shaw completed the work that she had been given by the Roxburghe Club to create a facsimile copy of "The Great Book of Thomas Trevilian" in two volumes. The book was given to the club's members. A copy of Shaw's facsimile book in 2020 was on sale for £2,200.

== Some notable members ==
A full list of the "Membership since 1812" can be found on the club website.

- Thomas Frognall Dibdin (founder member, 1812)
- Joseph Haslewood (founder member, 1812)
- Edward Vernon Utterson (founder member, 1812)
- Richard Heber (founder member, 1812)
- George Sutherland-Leveson-Gower, 2nd Duke of Sutherland (founder member, 1812)
- William Bolland (founder member, 1812)
- Henry Drury (elected 1813)
- George Hibbert (1757–1837) (elected 1816)
- Archdeacon Francis Wrangham (elected 1822)
- Sir Walter Scott (elected 1822)
- Edward Herbert, 2nd Earl of Powis (elected 1828)
- Evelyn Philip Shirley (elected 1839)
- William Edward Buckley (vice-president, 1884)
- Simon Watson Taylor (elected 1858)
- Henry Huth (d.1878) (elected 1866)
- Henry Bradshaw (elected 1866)
- John Duke Coleridge (elected 1875)
- Alfred Henry Huth (d.1910, son of Henry) (elected 1883)
- James Russell Lowell (elected 1884)
- Robert Gascoyne-Cecil, 3rd Marquess of Salisbury (elected 1884)
- Archibald Primrose, 5th Earl of Rosebery (elected 1884)
- Andrew Lang (elected 1891)
- M. R. James (elected 1909)
- William Osler (elected 1914)
- Thomas James Wise, forger and suspected thief (elected 1927)
- Sir Owen Morshead (elected 1931)
- Sir Charles Travis Clay (elected 1941)
- Sir Walter Oakeshott (elected 1949)
- Harry Lawrence Bradfer-Lawrence (elected 1954)
- Alan Noel Latimer Munby (elected 1957).
- Christopher Selby Dobson (elected 1964)
- Sir Robin Mackworth-Young (elected 1965)
- Frederick B. Adams Jr. (elected 1966)
- David Eccles, 1st Viscount Eccles (elected 1966)
- Nicolas Barker — Editor of The Book Collector (elected 1970)
- Sir Anthony R Wagner — Garter Principal King of Arms (elected 1972)
- Simon Harcourt Nowell-Smith (elected 1979)
- Mary, Viscountess Eccles (elected 1985)
- Sir John Paul Getty Jr. (elected 1988)
- Anthony Quinton (elected 1990)
- Robert Gascoyne-Cecil, 7th Marquess of Salisbury (elected 1993)
- Christopher de Hamel (elected 2001)
- Jane, Lady Roberts (elected 2003)
- Barry Humphries (elected 2011)
- Richard Ovenden (elected 2017)
- Hannah Rothschild (elected 2017)
- Alberto Manguel (elected 2021)

== See also ==
- The Philobiblon Society. A similar society which ran from 1853 to 1884, with editor Richard Monckton Milnes, 1st Baron Houghton.
