= Richard Heber =

English book-collector

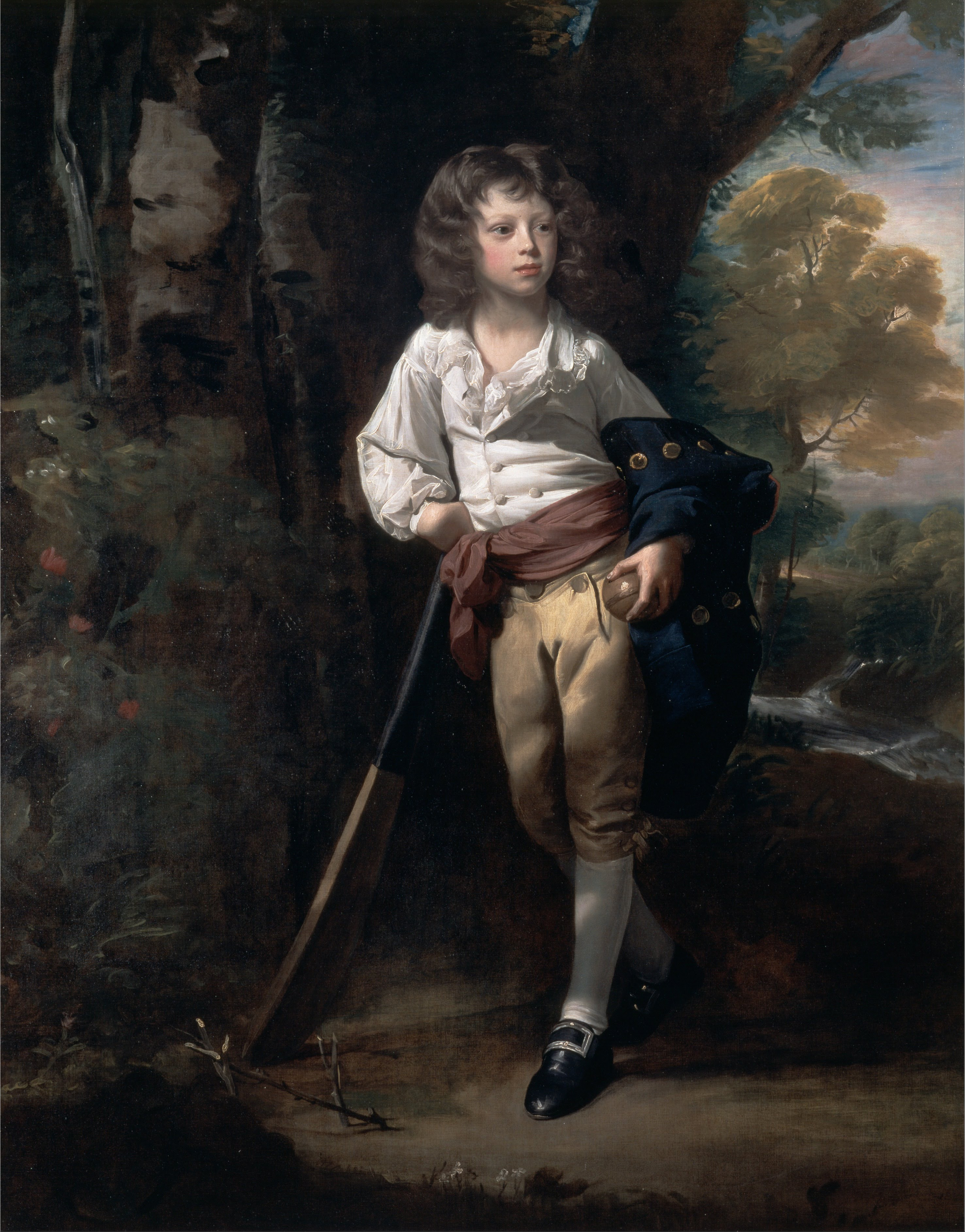
Heber as a nine-year-old boy in 1782, Portrait of Richard Heber by John Singleton Copley. Yale Center for British Art, New Haven, Connecticut.

Richard Heber (5 January 1773 – 4 October 1833) was an English book collector.

== Biography ==
He was born in Westminster, as the eldest son of Reginald Heber, who succeeded his eldest brother as lord of the manors of Marton in Yorkshire and Hodnet in Shropshire, and of Mary Baylie, his first wife. He attended Brasenose College, Oxford. At 19 he edited the works of Silius Italicus (2 vols. 12mo, 1792), and a year later prepared for the press an edition of Claudiani Carmina (2 vols., 1793).

He developed a taste for book collecting in childhood, and as an undergraduate he began to collect a purely classical library. His taste broadening, he became interested in early English drama and literature, and began his collection of rare books in these departments. Succeeding on the death of his father in 1804 to large estates in Yorkshire and Shropshire, which he considerably augmented, he forthwith devoted himself to the purchase of rare books. Heber was one of the 18 founders in 1812 of the Roxburghe Club of bibliophiles.

He possessed extensive landed property in Shropshire and Yorkshire, and was High Sheriff of Shropshire in 1821, was Member of Parliament (MP) for Oxford University from 1821 to 1826, and in 1822 was made a D.C.L. of that University. He was one of the founders of the Athenaeum Club, London.

In 1826 he and Charles Henry Hartshorne, a friend he had made through the Roxburghe Club, encountered gossip and innuendo over the nature of their relationship. John Bull hinted over two of its issues at the idea that it was sexual. Heber had abruptly left the country; Hartshorne pursued John Bull successfully through the courts.

After ransacking England for books, Heber travelled extensively on the Continent, purchasing everywhere, and leaving large depots of books in Paris, Antwerp, Brussels, Ghent, and elsewhere in the Netherlands and Germany. At booksales he sometimes purchased single volumes, sometimes whole libraries. Sir Walter Scott classed Heber's library as "superior to all others in the world"; Thomas Campbell described him as "the fiercest and strongest of all the bibliomaniacs." He did not confine himself to the purchase of a single copy of a work which took his fancy. "No gentleman," he remarked, "can be without three copies of a book, one for show, one for use, and one for borrowers." To such a size did his library grow that it overran eight houses, some in England, some on the Continent.

At his death his collection in England was estimated by Dibdin at 105,000 volumes, exclusive of many thousands on the Continent, the whole having cost upward of £180,000. Allibone in his Dictionary of Authors computes the volumes in England at 113,195, and those in France and Holland at 33,632, making a total of 146,827, to which must be added a large collection of pamphlets. This immense library was disposed of by auction after the owner's death, the sale lasting 216 days and realizing more than £60,000.

== Family ==
He was the half-brother of Reginald Heber, a bishop. After he died aged 60 in 1833, there was well-founded gossip that he had been homosexual. He was very close to another book collector named Frances Mary Richardson Currer. Currer helped Heber when he was in financial difficulties and came to aid his reputation after he died.

== Notes ==
Parliament of the United Kingdom
Preceded by Robert Peel; Sir William Scott	Member of Parliament for Oxford University; 1821–1826; With: Robert Peel	Succeeded by Robert Peel; Thomas Grimston Estcourt
