= Tsundoku =

Buying books without reading them

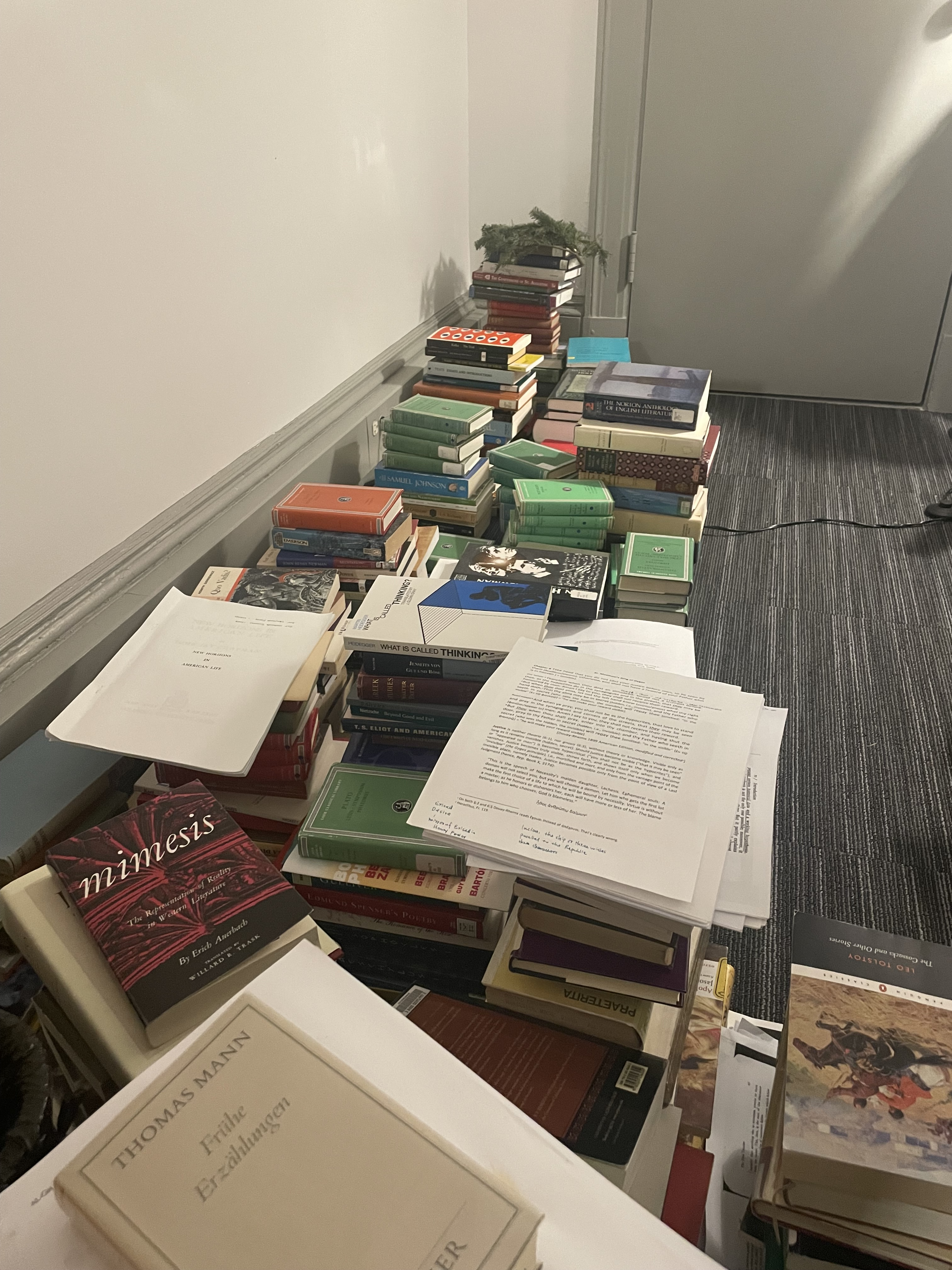
A pile of books and papers, compiled yet unread

Tsundoku (積ん読) is the phenomenon of acquiring reading materials but letting them pile up in a home without reading them. The term is also used to refer to unread books on a bookshelf meant for reading later.

The term originated in the Meiji era (1868–1912) as Japanese slang. It combines elements of the terms tsunde-oku (積んでおく; "to pile things up ready for later and leave"), and dokusho (読書; "reading books").

The American author and bibliophile A. Edward Newton commented on a similar state in 1921. The Canadian poet Robert W. Service remarked on the phenomenon in his poem, "Book Lover".

In his 2007 book The Black Swan, Nassim Nicholas Taleb popularized the term antilibrary, which was coined by Umberto Eco to characterize Jonathan Swift's description of a library in Gulliver's Travels and has been compared with tsundoku.

== See also ==
- Bibliophilia
- Bibliomania
