= Seatonian Prize =

Poetry award

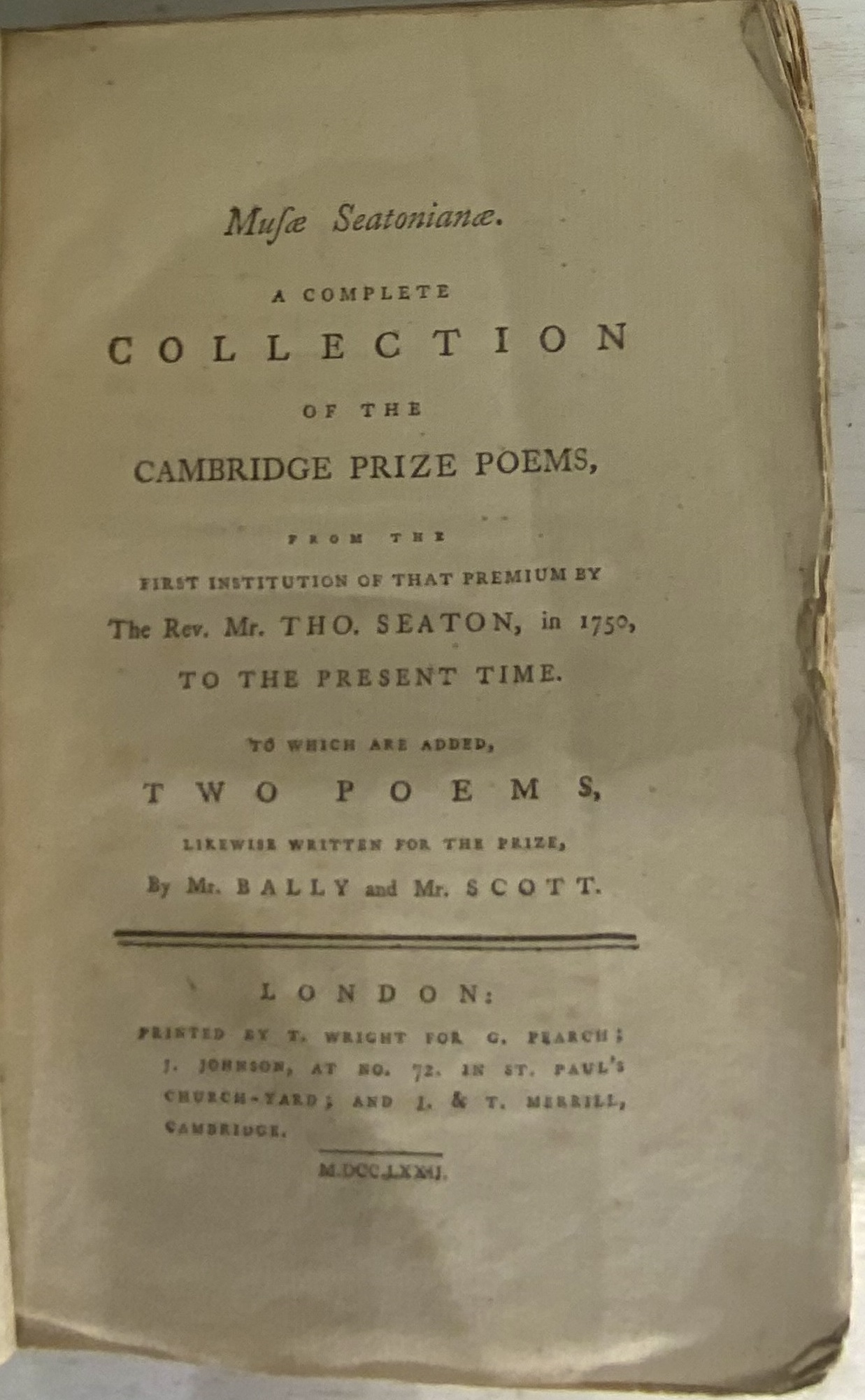
Musae Seatonianae, published 1772

The Seatonian Prize is awarded by the University of Cambridge for the best English poem on a sacred subject. This prize has been awarded annually since 1750 and is open to any Master of Arts of the university. Lord Byron referred to this prize in his 1809 poem entitled "English Bards and Scots Reviewers". The prize is still awarded annually, with a deadline of 30 September each year. It is open to all members of the Senate of the University of Cambridge, and to anyone with the status of Masters of Arts.

== Founding ==
This prize was founded by the Rev. Thomas Seaton, educated at Stamford School and a Fellow of Clare College, who died in 1741. The prize was financed by the revenue from his Kislingbury estate bequeathed to the university. His bequest was not formally accepted by the university until 1898, at which time regulations were drawn up for the administration of the Seatonian Prize by the Faculty of Divinity.

== Winners ==
The winner in the first three years was Christopher Smart. "On the Omniscience of the Supreme Being" (Cambridge, 1752) was his prize-winning "poetical essay" of that year. Smart won much credit by his success. In 1754 his fellowship was extended on condition that he continued to write for the prize. In 1759 the prize was won by Beilby Porteus for his poem on "Death", for which he is still remembered. In 1797, 1798, and 1799 the prize was won by William Bolland.

Byron's poem records the name of some of the winners:

Shall hoary Granta call her sable sons,

Expert in science, more expert at puns?

Shall these approach the Muse? ah, no! she flies,

Even from the tempting ore of Seaton's prize;

Though Printers condescend the press to soil

With rhyme by Hoare, and epic blank by Hoyle:

Not him whose page, if still upheld by whist,

Requires no sacred theme to bid us list.

Ye! who in Granta's honours would surpass,

Must mount her Pegasus, a full-grown ass;

A foal well worthy of her ancient Dam,

Whose Helicon is duller than her Cam.

In 2018, the Seatonian Prize was awarded to Colin Wilcockson of Pembroke College.

=== List of winners ===
- 1750: Christopher Smart (Pembroke) "On the Eternity of the Supreme Being"
- 1751: Christopher Smart (Pembroke) "On the Immensity of the Supreme Being"
- 1752: Christopher Smart (Pembroke) "On the Omniscience of the Supreme Being"
- 1753: Christopher Smart (Pembroke) "On the Power of the Supreme Being"
- 1754: George Bally "On the Justice of the Supreme Being"
- 1755: Christopher Smart (Pembroke) "On the Goodness of the Supreme Being"
- 1756: George Bally "On the Wisdom of the Supreme Being"
- 1757: Robert Glynn "The Day of Judgement"
- 1805: Edith Darcy "The Fall of Bethlehem"
- 1807: Charles Hoare. (St John's MA) "The Shipwreck of St. Paul"
- 1818: Alldersey Dicken, DD (1794-1871) (Fellow of Peterhouse 1816-32). Awarded for his poem, "Deborah" (Cambridge: J. Smith), which tells of the triumph of Deborah and Barak over Sisera's forces (see: Book of Judges, chapter IV).

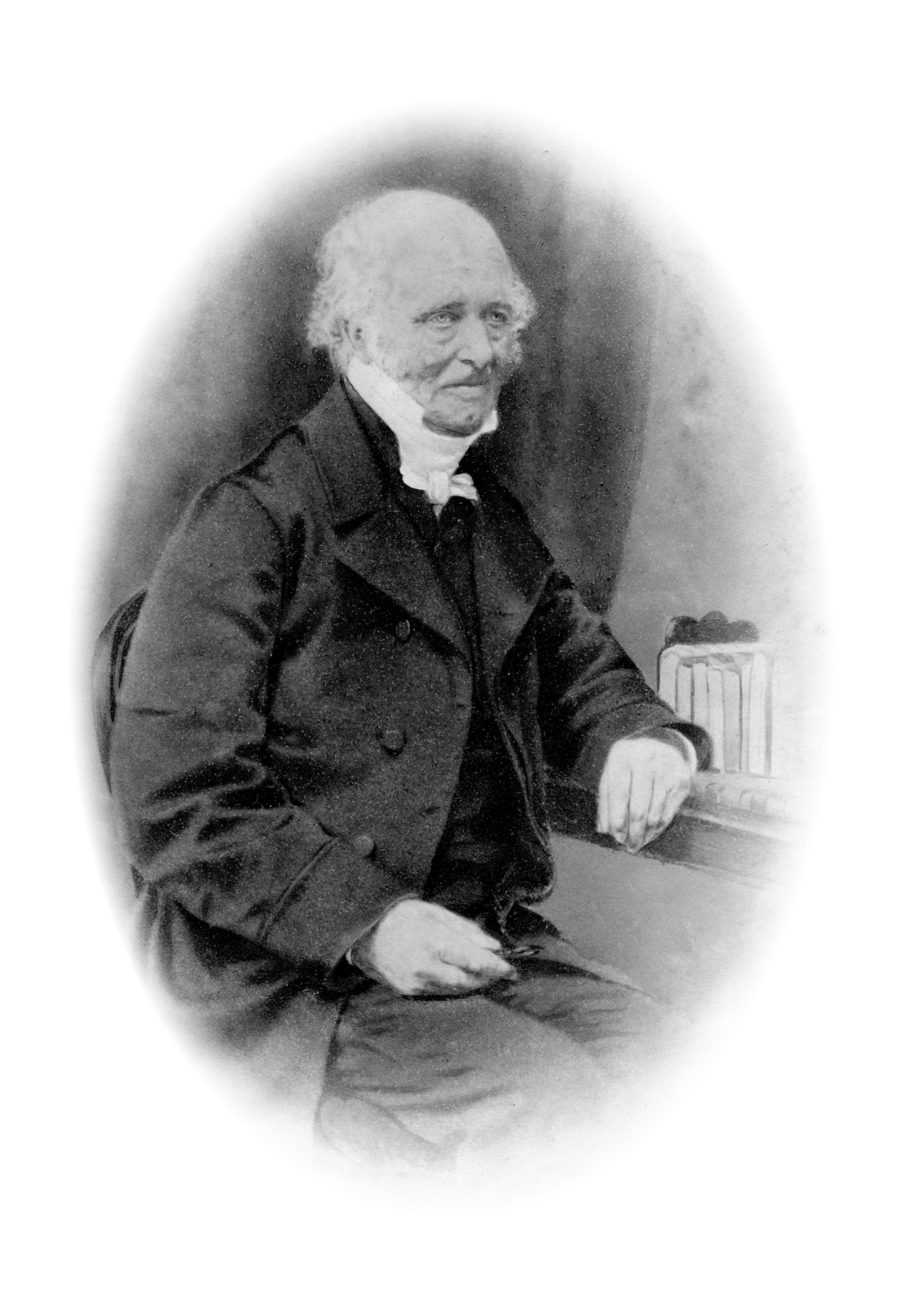
Alldersey Dicken, DD

.

- 1829: John Howard Marsden (1803-1891)(St John's MA 1829) "The Finding of Moses"
- 1902: Rev. John Hudson, Peterhouse, "Cyrus and the restoration of the Jews"
- 2017: Prof Randall Johnston, Pembroke, "O God, enfold me in the sun"
- 2018: Colin Wilcockson, Pembroke
