= Portrait of Richard Heber =

Painting by John Singleton Copley

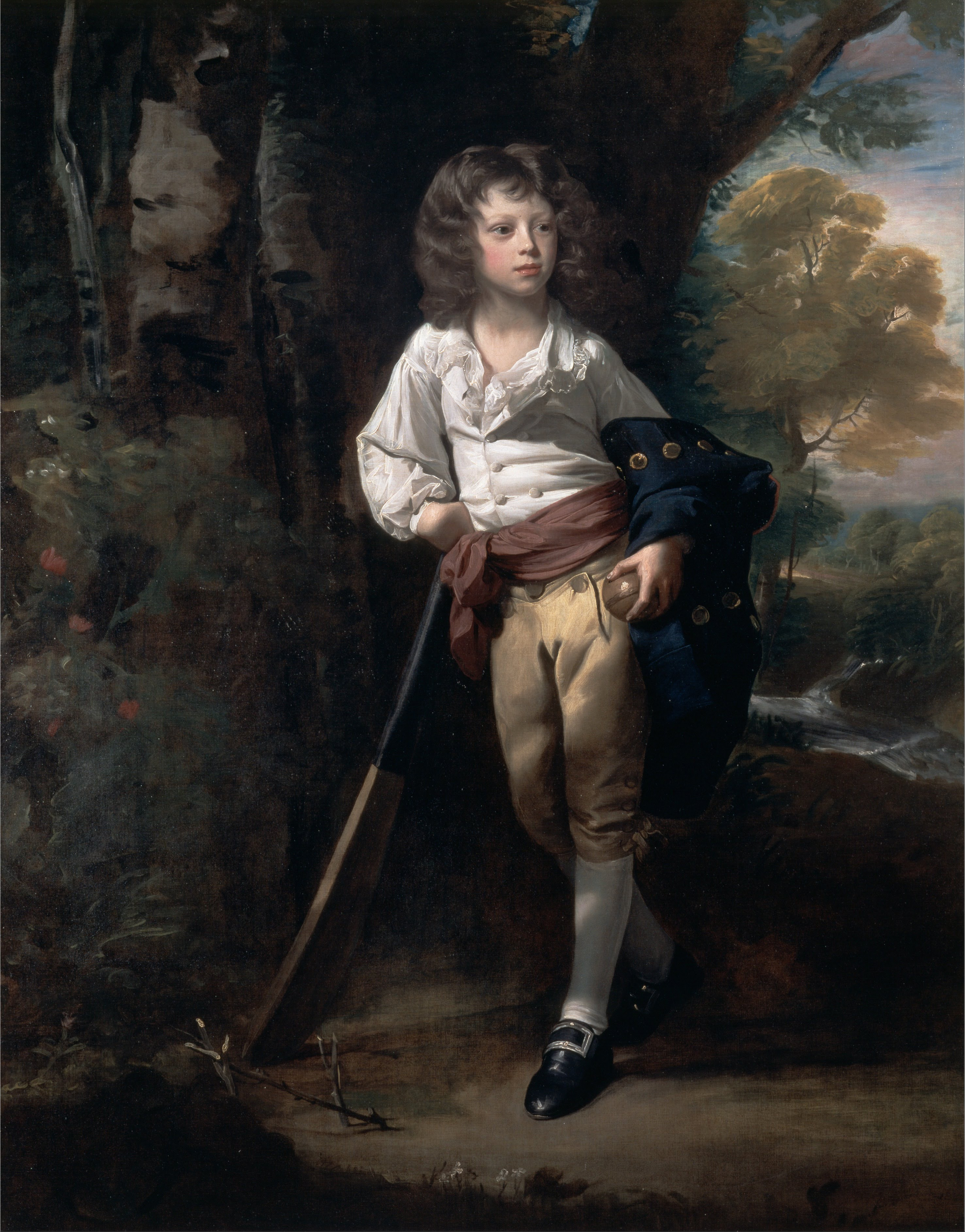
- Artist: John Singleton Copley
- Year: 1782
- Type: Oil on canvas, portrait painting
- Dimensions: 165.7 cm × 130 cm (65.2 in × 51 in)
- Location: Yale Centre for British Art; Connecticut

Portrait of Richard Heber is a 1782 portrait painting by the Anglo-American artist John Singleton Copley. It depicts Richard Heber at the age of eight, holding a cricket bat. The picture was commissioned by his father the Reverend Reginald Heber.

Heber grew up to be a Member of Parliament and a noted book collector. The Boston-born Copley has arrived in Britain in 1774 and settled there for the remainder of his career. Like his contemporary Benjamin West's The Cricketers (1763), it features a depiction of the game of cricket, growing in popularity amongst the British elite.

Today the painting is in the Yale Centre for British Art as part of the Paul Mellon Collection.

== Bibliography ==
- Kamensky, Jane. A Revolution in Color: The World of John Singleton Copley. W. W. Norton & Company, 2016.
- Prown, Jules David. John Singleton Copley: In England, 1774-1815. National Gallery of Art, Washington, 1966.
- Riess, Steven A. Sports in America from Colonial Times to the Twenty-First Century: An Encyclopedia. Taylor & Francis, 2015
