= William Herbert (bibliographer) =

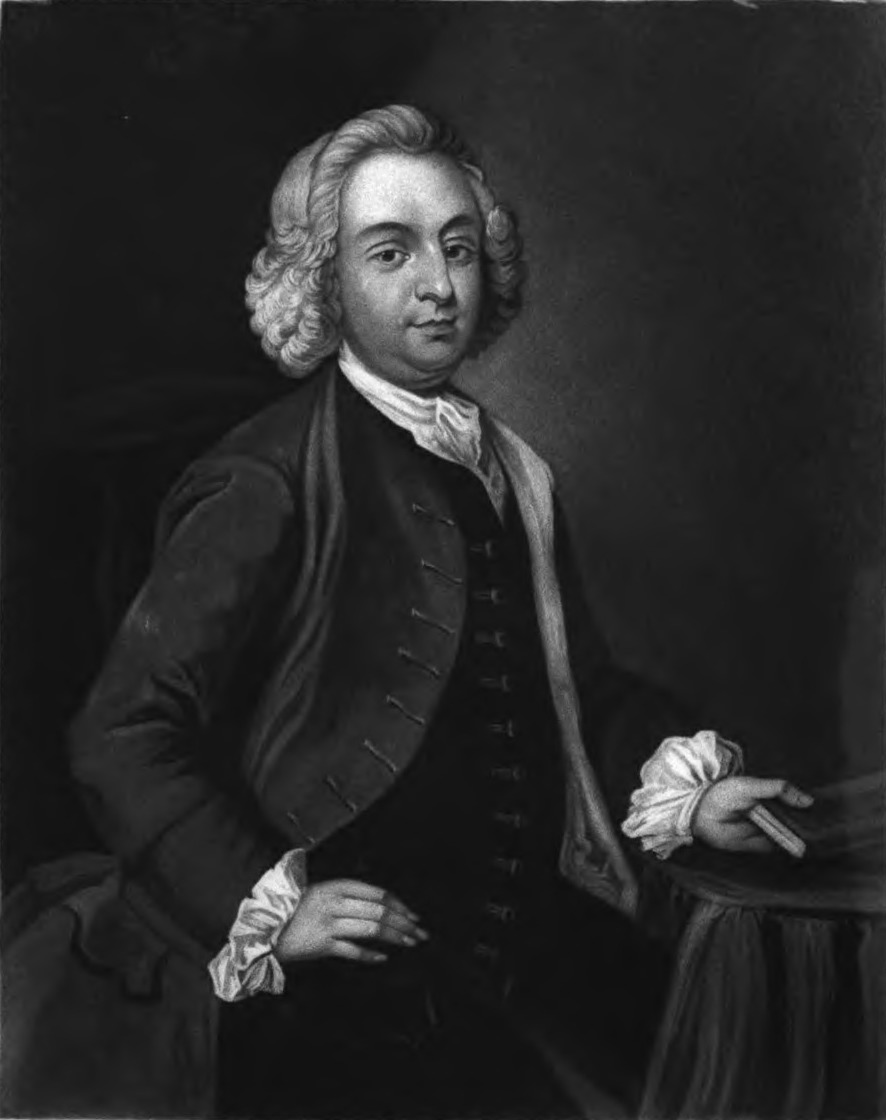
- Born: 29 November 1718; London
- Died: 18 March 1795 (aged 76)
- Occupation: Bibliographer, publisher, surveyor

William Herbert (1718–1795) was an English bibliographer, known for his revision of the Typographical Antiquities of Joseph Ames.

== Life ==
Born 29 November 1718, Herbert was educated at Hitchin, Hertfordshire. He was apprenticed to a hosier, and on the expiration of his articles took up his freedom of the city, and opened a shop in Leadenhall Street, London. He was admitted to the livery of his company and chosen a member of the court of assistants.

In order to learn the art of painting on glass, he gave up the hosiery business, but about 1748 accepted a situation as purser's clerk to three ships belonging to the East India Company. After an adventure with some French men-of-war at Tellicherry, he made a long overland journey with a small company of Indians, adopted a form of local dress, and let his beard grow. On returning to England he drew plans of settlements, for which the company gave him a grant. These plans were included in a publication issued by Bowles, a printseller, near Mercers' Chapel.

Herbert then established himself as a chart-engraver and printseller on London Bridge. A fire, which took place on the bank of the River Thames, suggested to him the plan of a floating fire engine, which was afterwards carried into practical effect. When the houses on London Bridge were pulled down, about 1758, Herbert moved to a shop in Leadenhall Street, on the site afterwards covered by an addition to the India House. After a short stay in Leadenhall Street, he moved to 27 Goulston Square, Whitechapel.

Herbert sold his business and stock to Henry Gregory for a thousand guineas, and retired to a country house at Cheshunt, Hertfordshire. He died childless, 18 March 1795, in his seventy-seventh year, and was buried in Cheshunt churchyard. He had married his first wife about the time of his residence on London Bridge. He married a second time to a niece of the Rev. Mr. Newman, pastor of the meeting in Carter Lane, a woman with money. He brought out catalogues of books, charts, and maps, and his business profits, added to his wife's income, enabled him to live well and to buy old books and manuscripts. After the death of his second wife, he married Philippa, daughter of John Croshold, mayor of Norwich, and niece of Robert Marsham of Stratton Strawless, Norfolk, who also brought him a good fortune. She died in 1808.

== Works ==
In 1758 he published, ‘at the Golden Globe, under the Piazzas, London Bridge,’ ‘A new Directory for the East Indies, with general and particular charts for the navigation of those seas, wherein the French Neptune Oriental has been chiefly considered and examined, with additions, corrections, and explanatory notes,’ a quarto volume, with folio charts. Herbert, who calls himself ‘hydrographer,’ states in the dedication to the East India Company, ‘all that has been set forth in the Neptune Oriental has been carefully examined and compared with the particular remarks and journals of ships in your honour's service, as also some country ones, besides many curious charts and plans I have been favoured with, as well as many collected whilst I was in India.’ A second and third edition, unaltered, were issued. William Nicholson supplied the practical sea-knowledge. A fourth edition, ‘with additions,’ was published by Herbert's successor in 1775; a fifth edition, ‘enlarged by S. Dunn,’ appeared in 1780.

When in Goulston Square he published the second edition of ‘The Ancient and Present State of Gloucestershire,’ by Sir Robert Atkyns (1768).

Joseph Ames's interleaved copy of his Typographical Antiquities, with the plates, blocks, and copyright, came into Herbert's possession, and in 1780 he issued proposals for a new edition, upon which he had then been engaged twenty years. He searched the registers of the Company of Stationers, worked in public and private libraries of the kingdom, and carried on correspondence with owners of rare books. Some of his letters to Cole, Steevens, Chiswell, Dalrymple, G. Mason, and others are preserved by John Nichols in his Literary Anecdotes and Illustrations. His edition of the Typographical Antiquities increased three times the size of the original of Ames. In 1785 was published the first volume; the book was favourably reviewed, the second volume appeared in 1786, and the third and concluding volume in 1790. The unfinished edition of Thomas Frognall Dibdin did not supersede it.

His library of old English books was dispersed after his death; a catalogue of some of his books was published in 1796 by his nephew, Isaac Herbert, bookseller, of 29 Great Russell Street, Bloomsbury.

== Notes ==
Attribution

This article incorporates text from a publication now in the public domain: "Herbert, William (1718-1795)". Dictionary of National Biography. London: Smith, Elder & Co. 1885–1900.
