= Antilibrary =

Unread book collection

An antilibrary is a collection of books that are owned but have not yet been read. The term was coined by Umberto Eco and popularized by Nassim Nicholas Taleb. The concept it describes has been compared to the Japanese tsundoku.

== Etymology ==
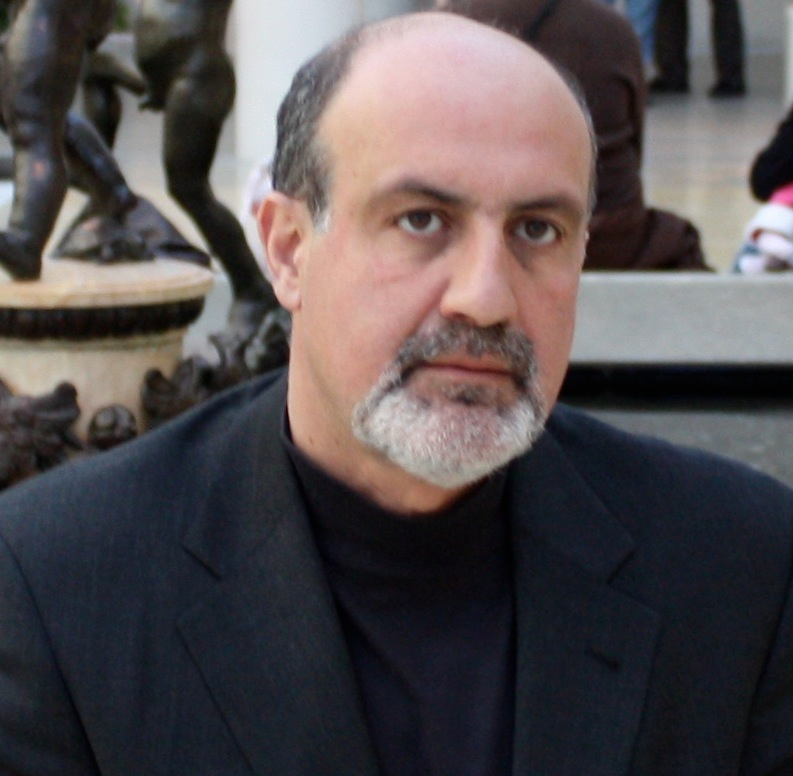
Nassim Nicholas Taleb popularized the term antilibrary

The term antilibrary was popularized by Nassim Nicholas Taleb in his book The Black Swan: The Impact of the Highly Improbable to describe the books that many people own but have not read. Taleb argued that such collections of books make people more humble and curious. He based the concept on the books kept by Umberto Eco —who invented the term "antilibrary" to describe Jonathan Swift's description of a library on Gulliver's Travels—writing that Eco "separates visitors into two categories": those who praise the size of his library and those who recognize that a library is a tool for research. Describing books that have been read as "far less valuable than unread ones", Taleb stated that "the more you know, the larger the rows of unread books. Let us call this collection of unread books an antilibrary." Taleb additionally referred to people interested in antilibraries as antischolars.

== Analysis ==
The Autumn 2015 issue of HAU: Journal of Ethnographic Theory included an editor's note which stated that "a scholar conscious of the power of his antilibrary is not concerned with treating knowledge as a property to possess or consume; rather [...] how much you don’t know—and how to find out that information when you need it." The editor, Giovanni da Col, further stated that the lower cost of open access publishing "generates more genuine possibilities of an open antilibrary".

In The New York Times in 2018, Kevin Mims compared Taleb's concept of the antilibrary to the Japanese term tsundoku, which also refers to books that have been purchased but not yet read. Mims additionally stated that "people like Taleb [...] and whoever coined the word tsundoku seem to recognize only two categories of book: the read and the unread", pointing out that many reference books are not meant to be read in their entirety and stating that he owned many biographies which he had not fully read. Writing in Big Think in 2018, Kevin Dickinson stated that the value of the antilibrary comes from the way it "challenges our self-estimation by providing a constant, niggling reminder of all we don’t know", fostering intellectual humility.
