= Henry Lawrence =

Henry Lawrence may refer to:

- Henry Lawrence (President of the Council) (1600–1664), English statesman who served as President of the English Council of State
- Henry Lawrence (Indian Army officer) (1806–1857), British soldier and statesman
- Henry F. Lawrence (1868–1950), American politician from Missouri
- Henry Lawrence (American football) (born 1951), American former American football player
- Henry Lawrence (rugby union) (1848–1902), English rugby union player
- Henry Sherwood Lawrence (1916–2004), American immunologist
- Henry Staveley Lawrence (1870–1949), governor of Bombay, 1926–1928
- Henry Lawrence (footballer) (born 2001), English association footballer

== See also ==
- Harry Lawrence (disambiguation)
