= Thomas Seaton =

The Reverend Thomas Seaton (baptised 2 October 1684 in Stamford, Lincolnshire – 18 August 1741 at Ravenstone, Buckinghamshire), was a Church of England clergyman and religious writer. Seaton died unmarried in 1741 at Ravenstone and is buried there.

== Education ==
He was educated at Stamford School and Clare College, Cambridge, graduating a BA in 1705 and a MA in 1708.

== Career ==
Seaton was elected a fellow of Clare College in 1706 and continued as a Fellow until 1721. He was ordained as a deacon in 1707 and priest of the Church of England in 1709.

He became chaplain to Daniel Finch, 2nd Earl of Nottingham. In 1713, he gained the vicarage of Madingley, Cambridgeshire, and in 1721 the city of Nottingham gave him the vicarage of Ravenstone in Buckinghamshire, which enabled him to give up his college fellowship with which he retained until his death.

In one of his works, The Conduct of Servants in Great Families (1720), he advised employers to oversee the moral conduct of their servants.

== The Seatonian Prize ==
On his death, Seaton left his estate at Kislingbury, Northamptonshire, to the University of Cambridge, with the object of funding an annual poetry prize for a poem in English on the nature of God or on another sacred subject, the judges to be the university's Vice-chancellor, the Professor of Greek, and the Master of Clare College. The Seatonian Prize has been awarded annually since 1750, apart from the years 1766, 1769, and 1771. Musae Seatonianæ includes most of the prize poems.

George Gordon, Lord Byron, another Cambridge graduate, refers to recipients of the celebrated university prize as "Seaton's sons" in his poem English Bards and Scotch Reviewers (1809).

== Publications ==
Seaton wrote several works, which included:

- The Divinity of our Saviour Proved (1719)
- The Conduct of Servants in Great Families (1720)
- The defects of the objections against the New Testament application of the prophecies in the Old exposed (1726)
- A Compendious View of the Grounds of Religion, both Natural and Revealed (1729)
