= Fiona Ross (type designer) =

British type designer, academic and linguist

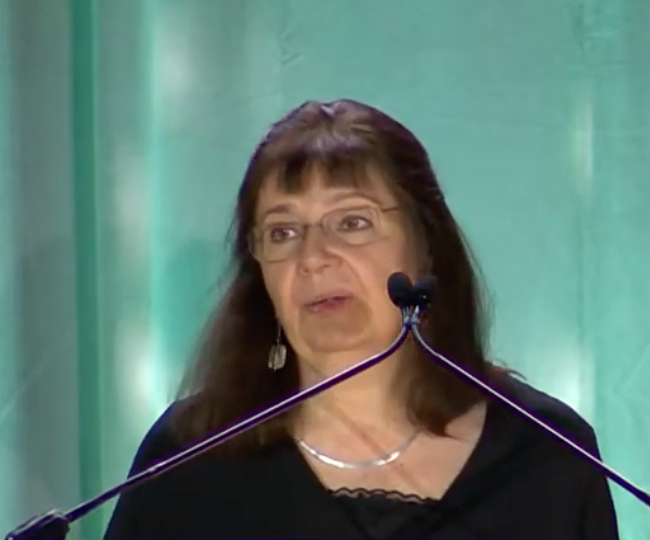
- Ross speaking at TypeCon2019 in Minneapolis, Minnesota
- Born: 1954 (age 71–72)
- Awards: 2014 SoTA Typography Award; 2018 TDC Medal

Academic background
- Education: SOAS, University of London
- Thesis: The evolution of the printed Bengali character from 1778 to 1978 (1988)

Academic work
- Institutions: University of Reading

Fiona Ross (born 1954) is a British type designer, academic and linguist. Since 2003, she has worked at the University of Reading, where she is a Professor and Lecturer in Non-Latin Typeface Design. She has received awards such as the 2014 SoTA Typography Award and the 2018 TDC Medal.

Ross was employed by Linotype's UK branch for designing fonts in non-Latin systems such as Bengali and Arabic. She received a PhD from SOAS, University of London in 1988, writing her thesis on the history of type design in the Bengali alphabet. She is a member of the Association Typographique International (ATypI) and a Fellow of the Royal Society of Arts. As of 2016, she had worked on type design in systems including: "Arabic, Hindi, Devanagari, Malayalam, Sinhala, and Thai".

From 2018 to 2021 Ross led the Leverhulme Trust funded Women in Type research project at the University of Reading.
