= Type Archive =

London museum of type founding

Coordinates: 51.4734°N 0.1157°W

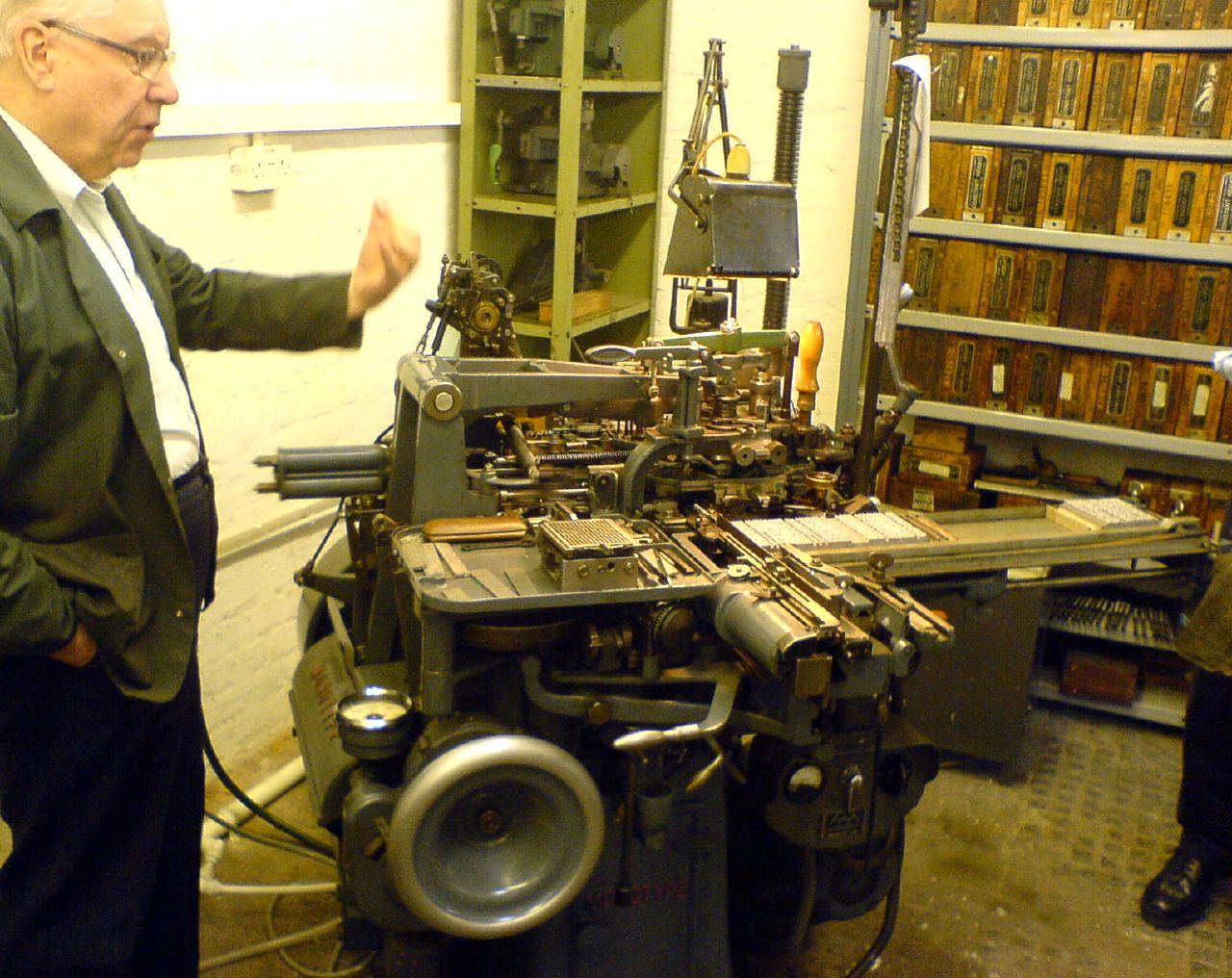
Gerry Drayton, the last surviving teacher of the Monotype School (96 years of age in 2020), behind a Monotype machine at the Type Museum, 2006

The Type Archive (formerly the Type Museum) was a collection of artefacts representing the legacy of type founding in England, whose famous type foundries and composing systems supplied the world with type in over 300 languages. The Archive was founded in 1992 by Susan Shaw in Stockwell, South London. The Archive announced in mid-2022 that it would relinquish its building and return portions of its collections to other institutions.

== Overview ==
The Type Archive was a repository of the original forms, punches, matrices and patterns of some of the most successful metal type and wood type foundries in England. It holds a historic collection of presses. The Archive estimated that its collections included over six million artefacts, though collating among sources provides a number over 10 million.

The Archive housed Monotype Hot-Metal Ltd., a group of four pensioners, formerly of the Monotype Corporation, who manufactured matrices (moulds for typecasting) for Monotype hot-metal typesetting equipment that remain in operation around the world to supply letterpress printing hobbyists and some commercial firms. The Archive offered apprenticeships and trained several individuals in matrix manufacture. These operations ended on 25 July 2022.

The Archive had no regular open hours nor scheduled availability for researchers for most of its operation. However, it conducted open houses from time to time, hosted occasional exhibitions in a gallery space, and had school groups in for printing workshops.

=== Collections ===
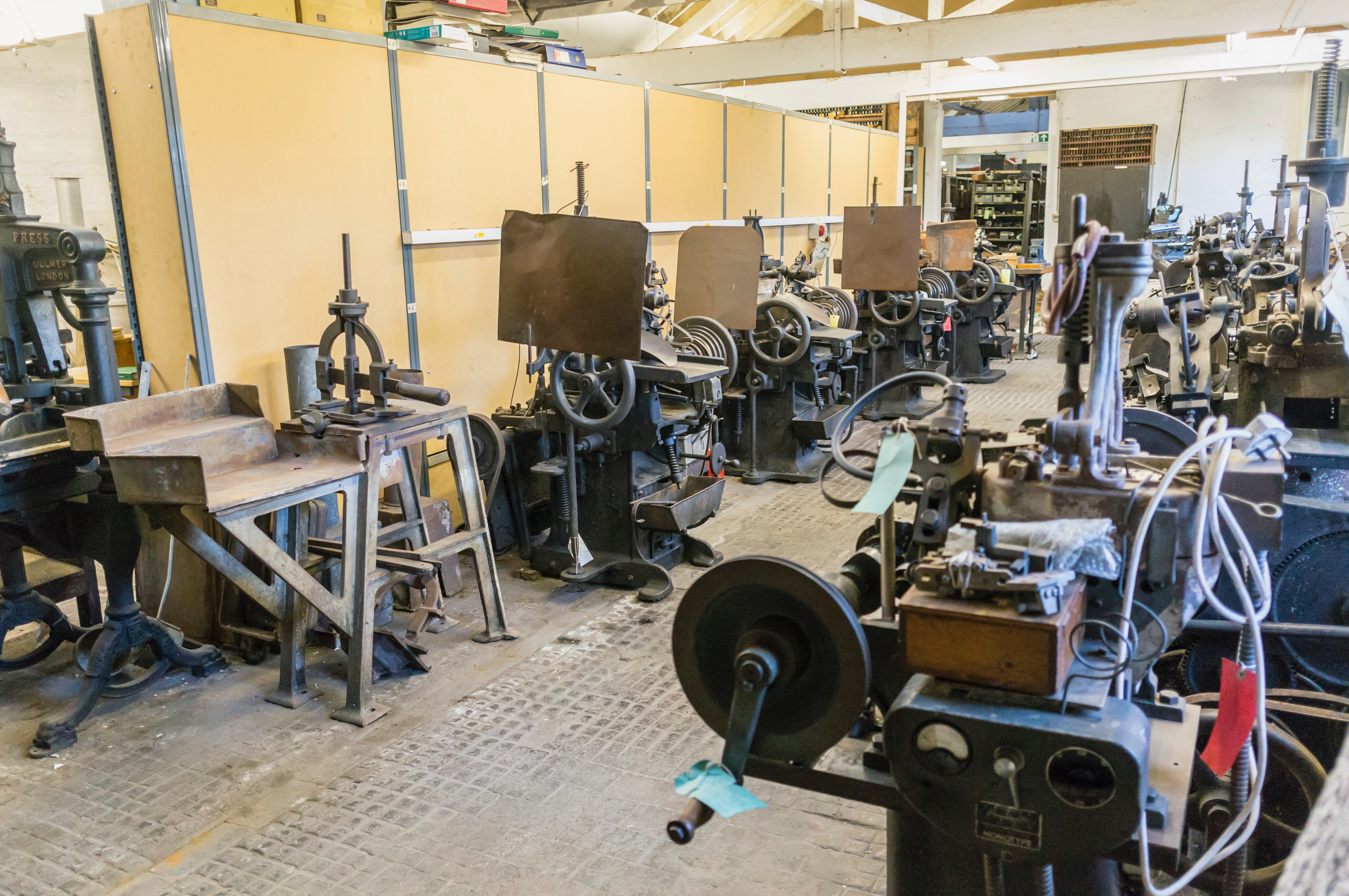
The extensive Monotype holdings of the archive were arrayed in huge vaults, including this portion full of Monotype hot-metal casting machines.

The Museum's major collections were:

- The Stephenson Blake Collection of English foundry type with industrial and hand casting equipment, which the Archive said consists of 2.5 million items. In their long trading history, Stephenson Blake & Company acquired many of the other famous-name English type foundries such as the Caslon Type Foundry. (The cataloguing of the Stephenson Blake collection obtained in 1996, was completed in 2005 by the late Justin Howes thanks to the Pilgrim Trust.) The remaining material associated with these companies resided at the Type Archive. In its announcement giving up its long-time campus, the Archive said the Victoria and Albert Museum would take custody on an interim basis.
- The Monotype Collection covers the entire history of Monotype Corporation's global supply of fine letterpress machine composition in almost all languages. The complete archive and plant of the Monotype Corporation was purchased with a National Heritage Memorial Fund (NHMF) grant in 1992. It belongs to the Science Museum, which delegated its care and operation to the Type Archive. SMG said in its 2021–2022 annual report that it would be “moving” the collection without specifying where to. (SMG estimates the collection at 6,600 items with 5 million parts.)
- The Robert DeLittle wood type manufactory – the last specialist English wood type manufacturer – comprises the patterns, pantograph (cutting equipment), tools, and some type. The Archive said the collection was purchased directly by the organisation's trustees. Its disposition has not yet been noted.

=== Entities ===
The Type Archive involves the following entities: the Type Museum Trust, which is a Registered Charity 1009198 and a Registered Museum 1101 and its subsidiary The Type Museum Limited Registered Company 3677895 (trading as Monotype Hot-Metal).

=== Location ===
The Archive was located for its 30-year history at a set of a buildings at 100 Hackford Road in Stockwell, London SW9 0QU. The buildings were once occupied by Price & King's veterinary medicine and quarantine station, sometimes housing baby elephants. This history led founder Shaw to use an elephant as a symbol of the Archive.

== Access ==
The Type Archive was run by a small team of staff and volunteers. Some were directly involved in the manufacture and provision of Monotype matrices and spare parts and employed by Monotype Hot Metal Ltd. The company had continuous orders for matrices and machine parts since it began operations from the Stockwell site. Uniquely skilled volunteers also maintained and operated the historic presses and Monotype casting machinery.

A major exhibition showcasing the work of the late Berthold Wolpe, artist, designer, calligrapher, type designer, and typographer ran from September to December 2017 through December. The Archive said around 1,000 visitors viewed the material on display. The Wolpe exhibition was arranged in conjunction with Monotype Imaging, using a combination of resources in possession of the Type Archive and the children of Berthold Wolpe.

An exhibition featuring the calligraphic work of Icelandic artist and handwriting expert, Gunnlaugur SE Briem, opened in June 2018, closing in mid-July that year.

The COVID-19 pandemic and the unrelated death of founder Susan Shaw (1932–2020) made access particularly difficult for staff, volunteers, and researchers from March 2020.

On 29 November 2021, Duncan Avery retired after over 75 years of involvement with the Monotype Corporation and then Monotype Hot-Metal Ltd.

An unsigned note on The Type Archive's website, posted in mid-2022, said the site would be relinquished and collections moved. Monotype Hot-Metal Ltd. informed its customers that it would halt its operation in July 2022.
