= Harry Lawrence Bradfer-Lawrence =

English antiquarian (1887–1965)

Harry Lawrence Bradfer-Lawrence (1 April 1887 – 19 October 1965) was an antiquarian with a particular interest in Norfolk and Yorkshire, England.

== Biography ==
He started a successful career as a Land-agent in Norfolk, interrupted only by the First World War, when he was commissioned in the Royal Navy Volunteer Reserve. In 1935, he moved to Yorkshire as land-agent to Sir William Aykroyd, Baronet of Grantley Hall. Also employed by Hammonds' brewery in Bradford, in 1942 rising to become Chairman, as well as Managing Director. He was to remain Chairman of United Breweries Limited, as Hammonds became through merger, until 1962. Residing in Ripon, at Grantley Grange and then Sharow End, he died on 19 October 1965.

== Historical interests ==
He was elected to the Norfolk and Norwich Archaeological Society in 1914, and during his years in that county contributed a number of articles to its journal Norfolk Archaeology as well as serving as a member of the Council of that Society. His association continued as vice-president until his death. Photographs taken in Norfolk by Bradfer-Lawrence are held in the Conway Library at The Courtauld Institute of Art, London, whose archive, of primarily architectural images, is being digitised under the wider Courtauld Connects project.

Elected a Fellow of the Society of Antiquaries of London in 1924, as Treasurer for twenty years from 1944, Bradfer-Lawrence served as Treasurer and contributed to improving the Society's financial management.

Bradfer-Lawrence quickly became interested in the history of Yorkshire, being accepted to membership of the Yorkshire Archaeological Society on 31 January 1936, and served on its council for many years.

He was to maintain a lively interest in all matters antiquarian and assembled a substantial collection of charters, seals, manuscripts and books, and was a member of the Roxburghe Club.

Bradfer-Lawrence was interested in the sale by auction of two 15th-century works printed by William Caxton, by the Ripon Cathedral Library in 1960, for he arranged to have photographic facsimiles made for his own library.

Both the Norfolk Record Society and the Yorkshire Archaeological Society received materials from his collection. The latter, whose extensive library and archives are in Leeds, received a substantial collection of family and estate documents, medieval charters, accounts, maps, manorial records and letters, relating to the county, originating from the 12th to the 20th century. The British Museum also holds a number of artefacts, mainly from excavations in Bawsey Norfolk, and some prints that were acquired from or donated by Bradfer-Lawrence during his lifetime. Following his death, his son, Col. P.L. Bradfer-Lawrence, and daughter, Mrs B.E. Gray deposited 47 manuscripts collected by their father with the Fitzwilliam Museum, Cambridge on long loan, some of which were later purchased by the museum. Others were sold at auction. An important manuscript from the Bradfer-Lawrence Collection at the Fitzwilliam was the subject of a book An Early Breton Gospel Book. A Ninth-Century Manuscript from the Collection of H. L. Bradfer-Lawrence by Professor Francis Wormald and Professor Jonathan Alexander.
