= Joseph Ames (author) =

English bibliographer and antiquary (1689–1759)

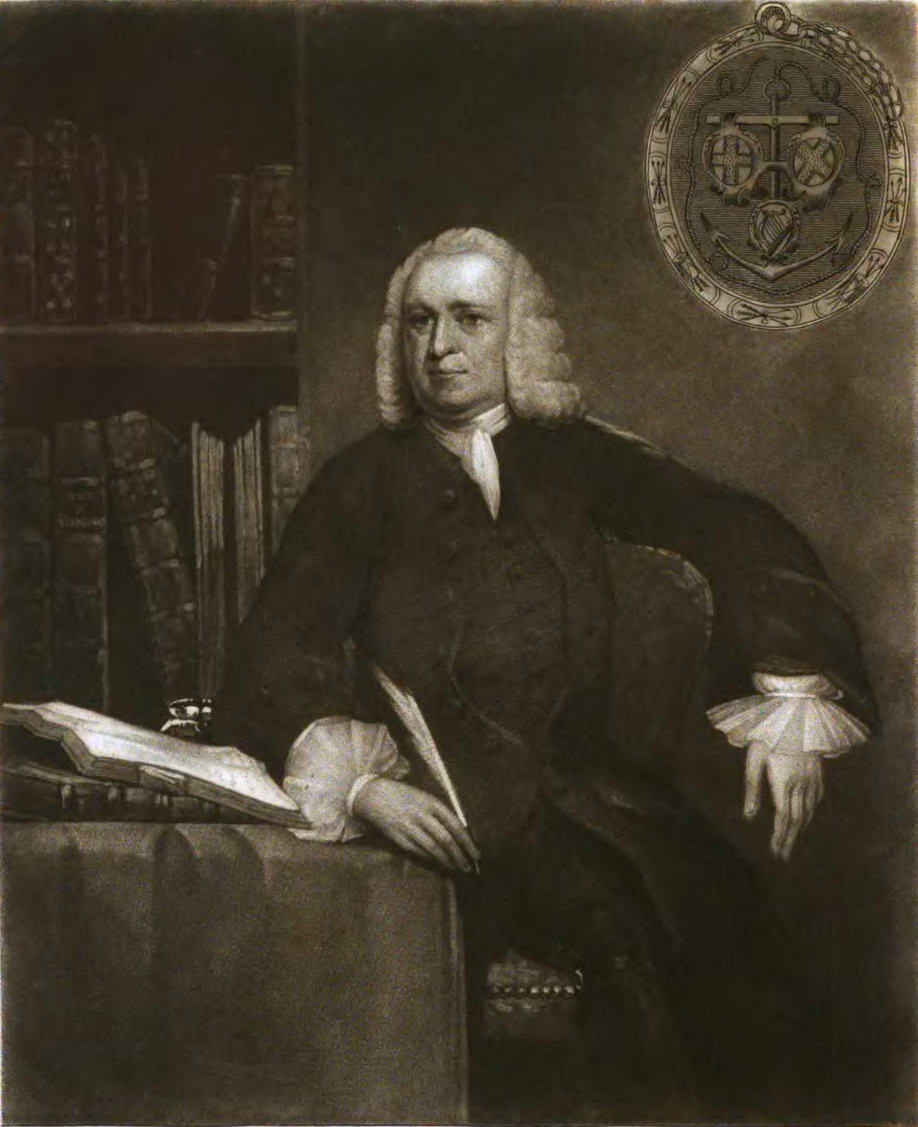
- Gravura de Joseph Ames em Typographical antiquities; or the history of printing in England, Scotland and Ireland, 1810
- Born: 23 January 1689; Great Yarmouth
- Died: 7 October 1759; London
- Occupations: Bibliographer, antiquarian, merchant, antiquarian bookseller

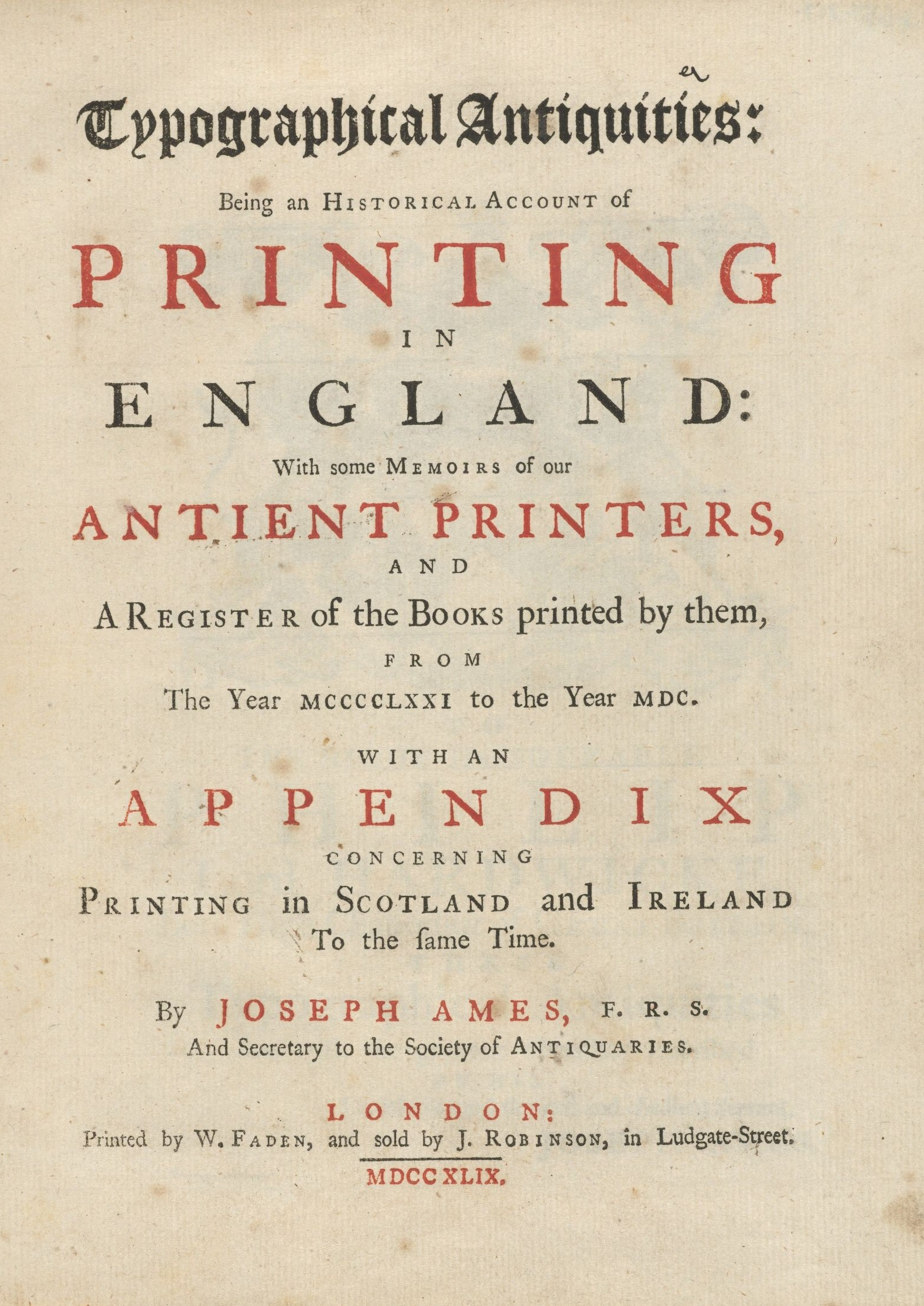
Typographical Antiquities, 1749

Joseph Ames (23 January 1689 – 7 October 1759) was an English bibliographer and antiquary. He purportedly wrote an account of printing in England from 1471 to 1600 entitled Typographical Antiquities (1749). It is uncertain whether he was by occupation a ship's chandler, a pattern-maker, a plane iron maker or an ironmonger. Though never educated beyond grammar school, he prospered in trade and amassed valuable collections of rare books and antiquities.

== Life ==
He was the eldest child of John Ames, a master in the merchant service and sixth son of Captain Joseph Ames, R.N. Joseph Ames was born at Yarmouth on 23 January 1689 and was educated at a small grammar school in Wapping. He lost his father at age 12 and three years later was apprenticed to a plane maker in King Street or Queen Street, near the Guildhall, City of London. He then moved to Wapping near the Hermitage, where his father had previously settled, and established a successful business there. In 1712 his mother died and was buried in Wapping church near her husband. Two years later Ames married Mary, daughter of William Wrayford, a merchant in Bow Lane. She died in 1734 after bearing six children, of whom only a daughter survived her.

Ames was elected a Fellow of the Society of Antiquaries in 1736 and was appointed secretary five years later; he held the position until his death, the Rev. William Norris being associated with him in 1754. He was elected a Fellow of the Royal Society in 1743, but his only contribution to the Society's Philosophical Transactions was a letter relating to a case of plica polonica in 1747.

After dining with his old friend Sir Peter Thompson, Ames was seized with an attack that brought about his death that evening, 7 October 1759, in the seventy-first year of his life. He was buried in the churchyard of St George-in-the-East.

== Reputation ==
Ames made no pretence to literary merit, and his position in the Society of Antiquaries generated a degree of antagonism. Edward Rowe Mores described him as 'an arrant blunderer' and accused him, with justification, of tearing out the title-pages of rare books in his collection. Among the works he is thought to have thus mutilated is the British Library copy of William Tyndale's 1526 New Testament, one of only two textually complete copies known. Francis Grose said that the history of printing published under his name actually was written by John Ward of Gresham College, though the materials probably were collected by Ames. William Cole thought he wrote like an illiterate and said he was an Independent by profession, but a deist in conversation. William Oldys (British Librarian, p. 374) acknowledges obligations to Ames, whom he styles 'a worthy preserver of antiquities.'

== Collector ==
Ames assembled a large collection of portraits, especially those of printers, although many were of doubtful authenticity. He also collected coins, 'natural curiosities,’ inscriptions, antiquities and rare English books and manuscripts. Many of the books were annotated by former owners, and the manuscripts included a number of valuable historical transcripts. The collection was sold in 1760 after his death by Abraham Langford.

Among the collection was an interleaved copy of the Typographical Antiquities in two volumes, with manuscript additions. The lot, which included plates, blocks, and copyright, was purchased by Sir Peter Thompson and afterwards was sold by him to William Herbert, who made use of it for his own edition of the book (1785–1790). Another edition was by Thomas Frognall Dibdin (4 vols., 1810–1819).

== Works ==
His works are:

- 'A Catalogue of English Printers, from the year 1471 to 1600, most of them at London, (without date or place), 4 pp.; the copy in the Society of Antiquaries Library is inscribed, 'Presented by Mr. Ames, 20 March 1739–40.'
- 'An Index to the Pembrokian Coins and Medals' (without date or place, ?1746), 8 pp., with device. The volume of engravings of the cabinet of coins belonging to the Earl of Pembroke, Numismata Antiqua, was brought out in 1746 without any text. Ames printed for private distribution an index of four leaves, a transcript of the names of the coins as shown upon the plates.
- 'A Catalogue of English Heads, or an account of about two thousand prints describing what is particular on each; as the name, title, or office of the person, the habit, posture, age or time when done, the name of the painter, graver, scraper, &c., and some remarkable particulars relating to their lives,’ London, 1748.
- 'Typographical Antiquities, being an historical account of printing in England, with some memoirs of our antient printers, and a register of the books printed by them, from the year 1471 to 1600, with an appendix concerning printing in Scotland and Ireland to the same time,’ London, 1749.
- 'Parentalia, or Memoirs of the Family of the Wrens, viz. of Matthew, bishop of Ely, Christopher, dean of Windsor, &c., but chiefly of Sir Christopher Wren, late surveyor-general of the royal buildings, P.R.S. &c., in which is contained, besides his works, a great number of original papers and records on religion, politics, anatomy, mathematics, architecture, antiquities, and most branches of polite literature, compiled by his son Christopher; now published by his grandson, Stephen Wren, Esq., with the care of Joseph Ames,’ London, 1750.

Ames owed his studious tastes to the Rev. John Russel of St John's, Wapping and the Rev. John Lewis. He also made the acquaintance, while attending lectures by John Theophilus Desaguliers, of Peter Thompson, a Hamburg merchant and Member of Parliament for St Albans. Lewis had made collections for a history of printing in England, and suggested to Ames that he should undertake the work. Notes sent to Ames include lists of printers and facsimiles of their marks, copies of title-pages, extracts, &c.

Samuel Palmer published a similar work; it appeared in 1732, but not to acclaim. In 1739–40 Ames circulated a preliminary list of English printers from 1471 to 1600, which included 215 names, most of them being those of London men, with the announcement: 'As the history and progress of printing in England, from 1474 to 1600, is in good forwardness for the press; if any gentleman please to send the publisher, Jos. Ames in Wappin, some account of these printers, or add others to them, or oblige him with what may be useful in this undertaking, the favour will be gratefully acknowledged.'

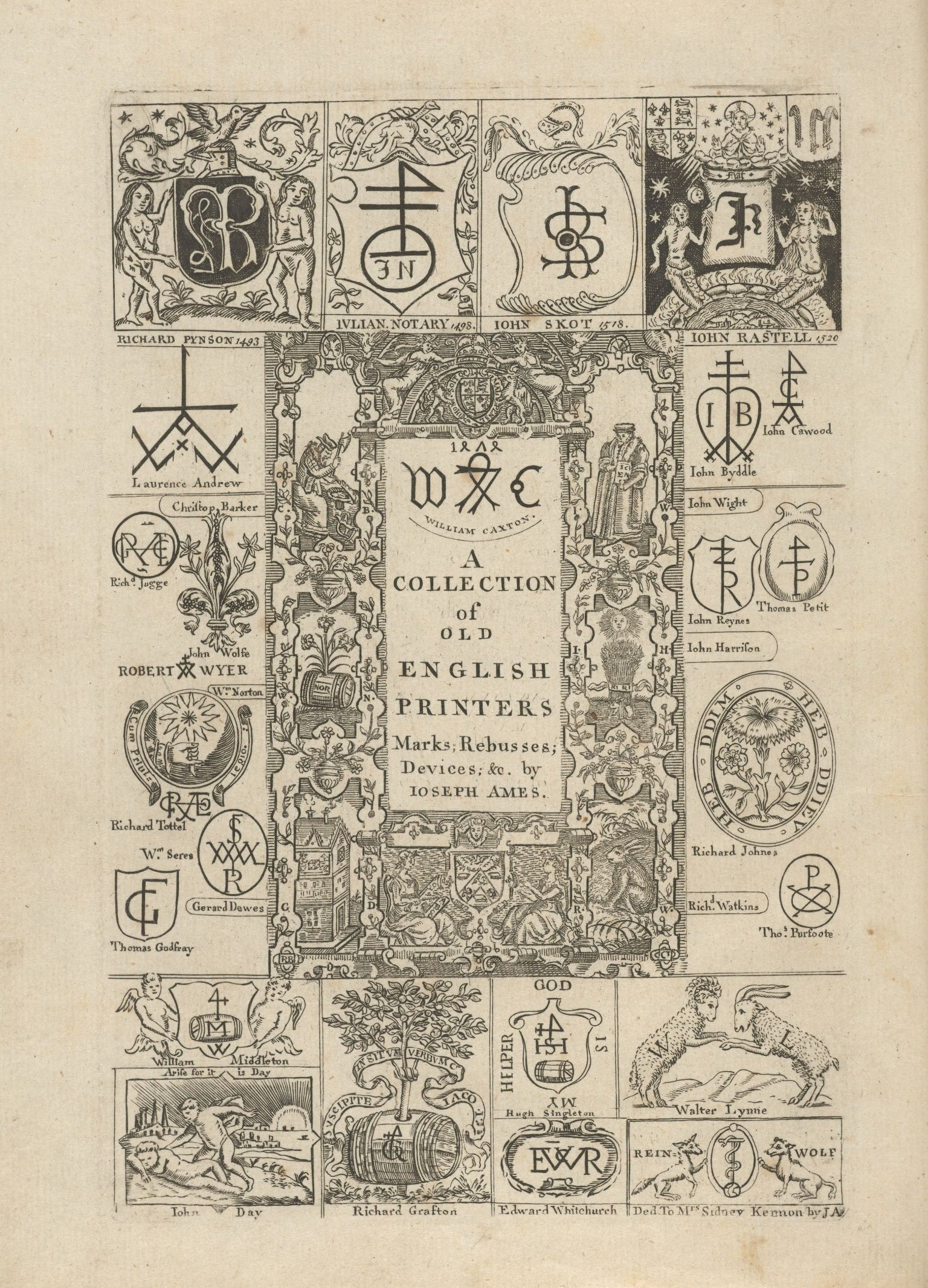
Frontispiece to Typographical antiquities (1749), showing many printers' rebuses.

In 1748[7] he printed a 'Catalogue of English Heads,’ being an index to the collection of 2,000 prints, bound in ten volumes, belonging to John Nickolls, F.R.S., the Quaker antiquary of Ware, Hertfordshire. It formed the first attempt at a general description of English engraved portraits, a work resumed by James Granger twenty years later.

In 1749, the Typographical Antiquities appeared, a quarto of over 600 pages, dedicated to Lord Chancellor Hardwicke. The original proposals contemplated only 200 copies, but 301 were subscribed for, and the list shows that the book was supported by leading antiquaries and printers. Ames owed much to the investigations of others. A portion of his extensive bibliographical correspondence with Andrew Ducarel, John Anstis, Lewis, Bishop Lyttleton, Rawlinson and others is given by John Nichols. The libraries of Lord Orford, Sir Hans Sloane, Anstis, and other friends, were used for his researches. Ames earned the gratitude of subsequent bibliographers by disregarding printed lists and consulting the title pages of the books themselves.

Parentalia (1750) was a memoir of the Wrens, undertaken in conjunction with Sir Christopher Wren's grandson, Stephen Wren. Part of his correspondence in bibliography is included in Nichols's Literary Anecdotes and Illustrations.
