= Hackford Road =

Street in Oval, London

Coordinates: 51.4759°N 0.11505°W

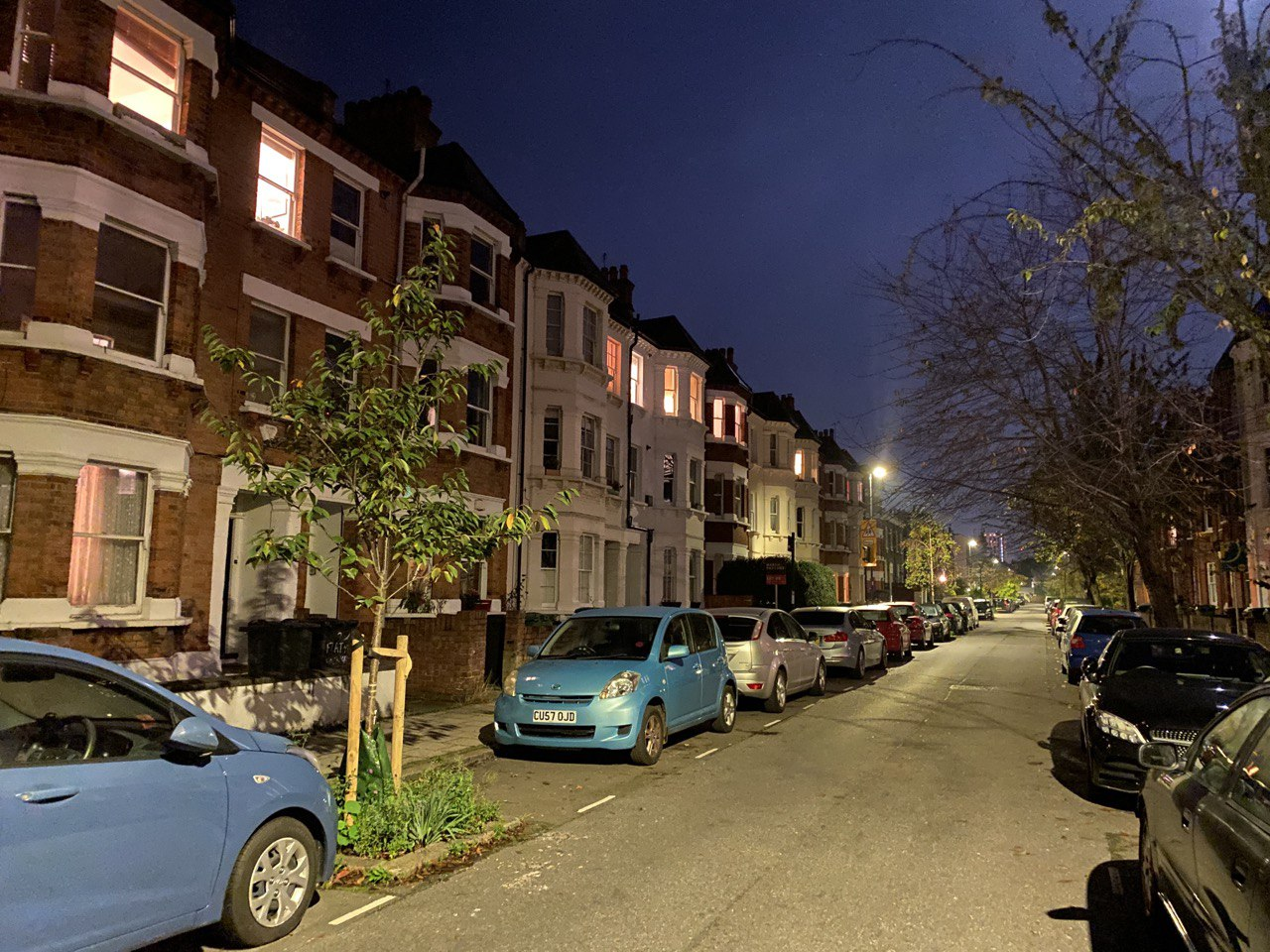
- Hackford Road in 2022
- Interactive map of Hackford Road
- Location: Oval, Lambeth, London, England

Hackford Road is a road in Oval, Lambeth, south London, England. It runs north–south and is located between Clapham Road (A3) to the west and Brixton Road (A23) to the east. To the north is the Oval tube station.

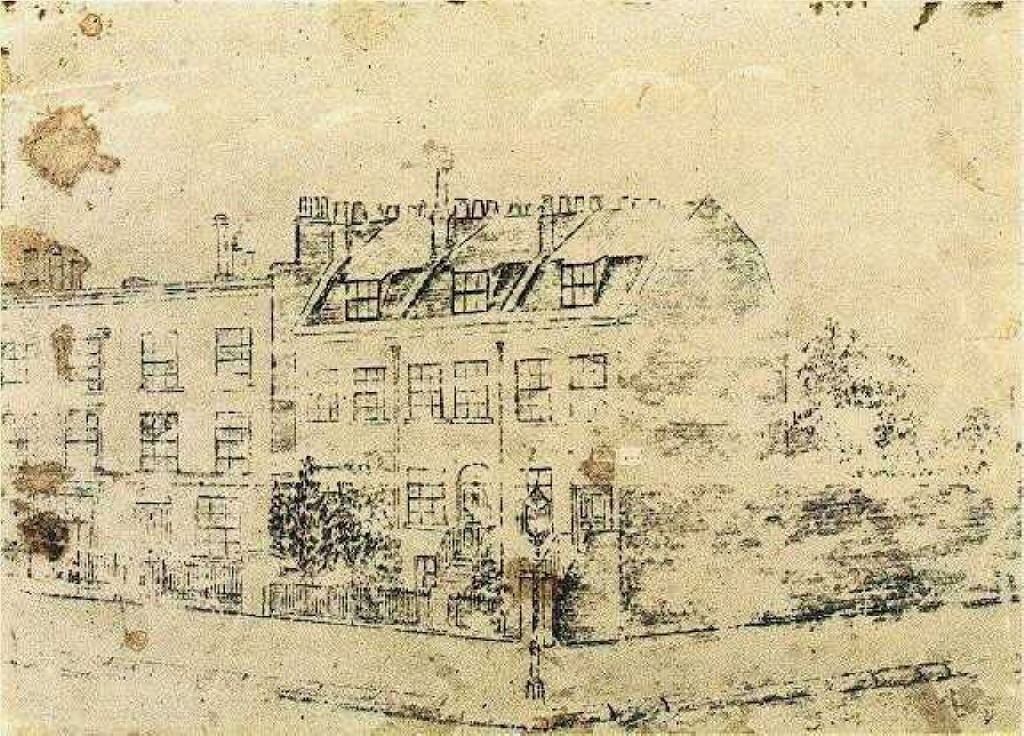
Van Gogh's drawing of 87 Hackford Road

The artist Vincent van Gogh (1853–1890) lived at 87 Hackford Road, then the house of Ursula Loyer and her daughter Eugenie, in 1873 and 1874. He wrote to his brother Theo van Gogh from this address. He arrived in London to start work at the art dealership Goupil & Co. in Southampton Street, central London, on 19 May 1873.

From August of that year, van Gogh lived in Hackford Road. His stay is now recorded with a blue plaque, installed a hundred years later in 1973. He sketched the Georgian terrace opposite Durand School in Hackford Road during the 1870s. There is a small conservation area, first designated in 1974, which includes the house where van Gogh lived.

The Type Museum, opened in 1992, is located at 100 Hackford Road, at the southern end.
