= 87 Hackford Road (Van Gogh) =

Drawing by Vincent van Gogh

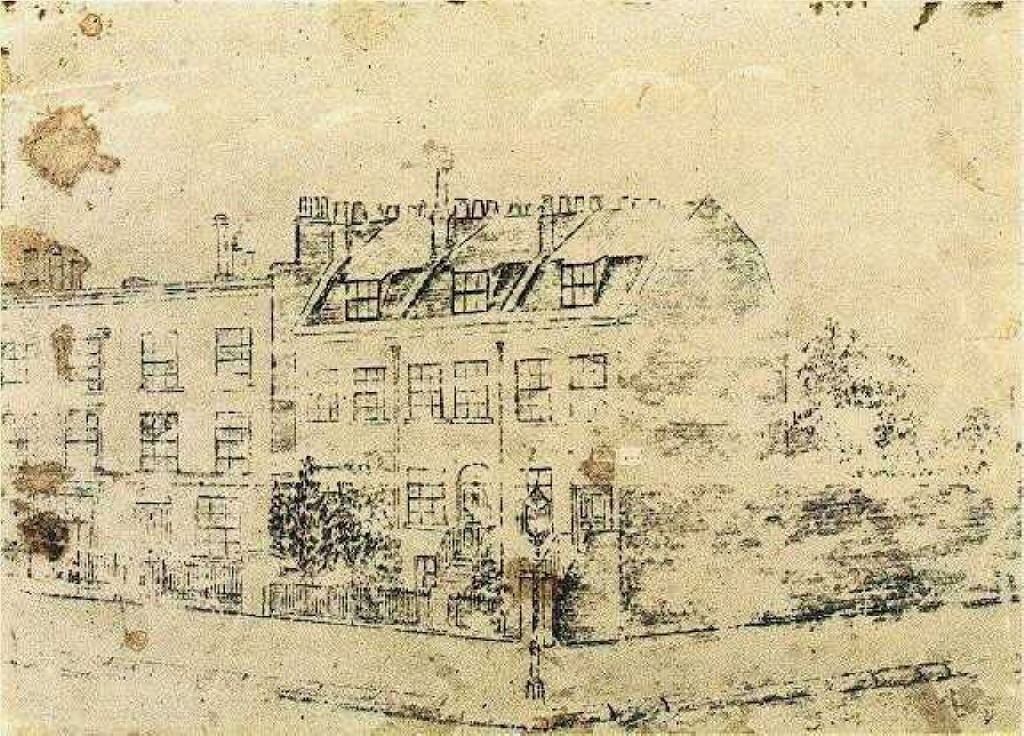
- Artist: Vincent van Gogh
- Year: 1873 or 1874
- Type: Drawing
- Medium: Pencil and chalk on paper
- Subject: Houses in Hackford Road, London, England
- Condition: Stained
- Owner: Anne Shaw

87 Hackford Road is the first known work of Vincent van Gogh, dating back to 1873 or 1874. It depicts the house where he lived while working in London. It was only recognised as his work a whole century later, in 1973.

== Background ==
Van Gogh lodged at the home of Ursula Loyer and her daughter Eugenie, at 87 Hackford Road, Stockwell, London, England, from August 1873, while working at the art dealership Goupil & Co.

He sketched the 1824-built, three-storey Georgian terrace including the house, opposite Durand School, using pencil with chalk highlights. He lettered the wall "Hackford Road" and the gate "Maison Loyer."

== Discovery ==
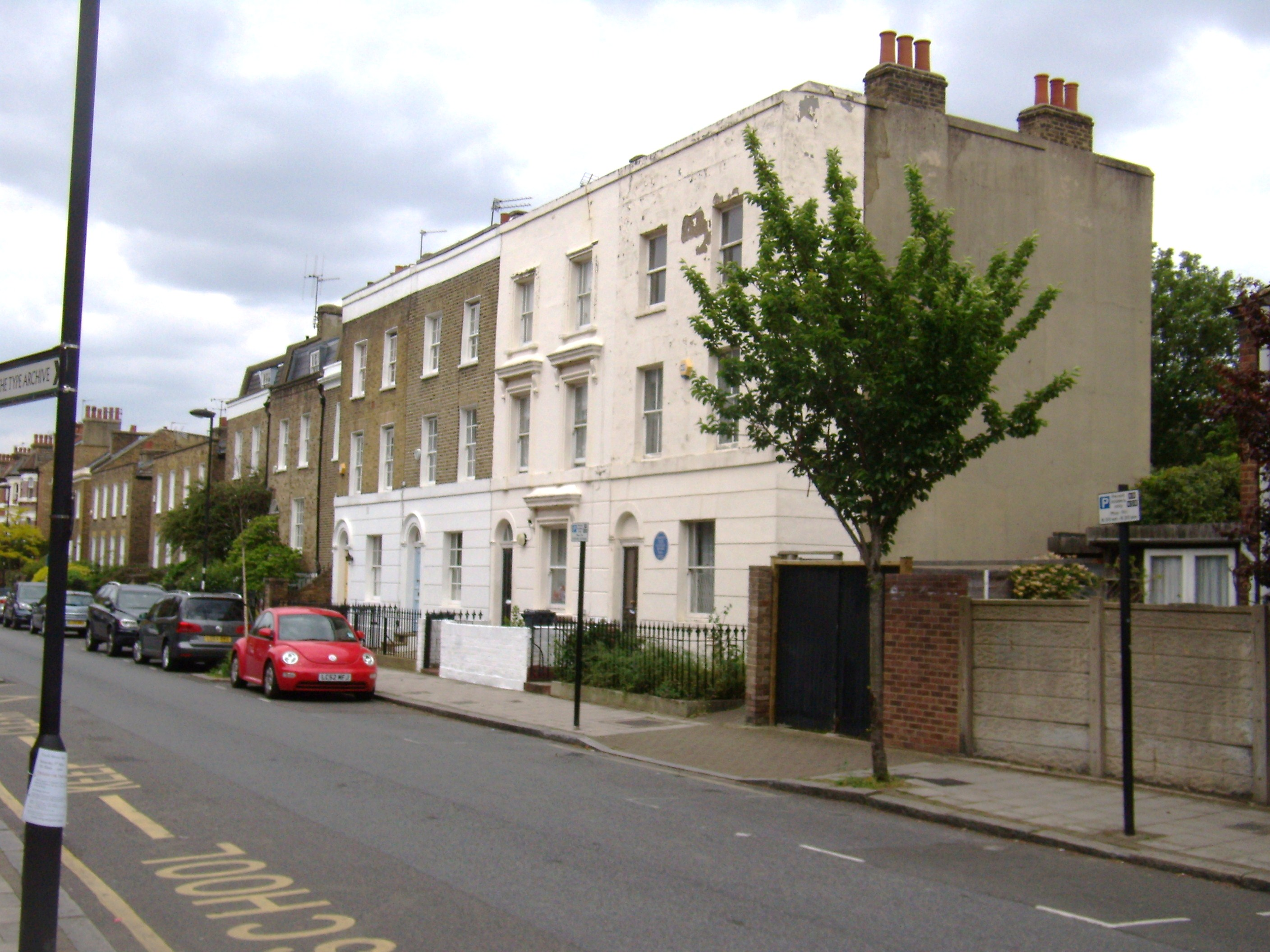
Houses in Hackford Road, in 2016; the English Heritage's blue plaque is visible on the front of number 87

In 1973, while researching an article on van Gogh, the journalist Ken Wilkie visited Eugenie's granddaughter, Kathleen Maynard, at her home in Stoke Gabriel, Devon, England. While she was showing him photographs of the Loyers and their house, he noticed a dusty, tea- or coffee-stained drawing in the box in which the photographs were kept. Maynard recalled that her father said it had been drawn by "one of my [Maynard's] Grandmother's lodgers" and "it's been up in the attic as long as I can remember".

Wilkie recognised it as depicting the house in Hackford Road, and being potentially Van Gogh's work. With Maynard's blessing, he took it to Amsterdam, where Dr Hans Jaffé, an authority on the artist working at the University of Amsterdam, authenticated it. The final paragraph of Jaffé's report read:

On the grounds of topographical evidence, the origin of the drawing, but especially on the grounds of the style in which this drawing has been made... I do not hesitate to accept the drawing shown to me as a work of Vincent van Gogh from his London period 1873–1874.

== Display ==
Maynard lent the drawing to the Van Gogh Museum in Amsterdam, for its reopening in 1973, and it remained in their care for over three decades, during which time it was exhibited there, and at the Kröller-Müller Museum and at the Barbican Centre in London. Maynard died in 2000, and in 2005 her daughter Anne Shaw requested its return; and so it remains in the possession of the original family.

== See also ==
- List of works by Vincent van Gogh
