= Susan Shaw (publisher) =

British publisher, archivist and museum founder (1932–2020)

- Born: Susan Mary Mahon; 12 August 1932; Royal Buckinghamshire Hospital, Aylesbury, England
- Died: 13 June 2020 (aged 87)
- Occupation: Publisher
- Known for: Founding the Type Archive

Susan Mary "Sue" Shaw (née Mahon; 12 August 1932 – 13 June 2020) was a British publisher, archivist and the founder of the Type Museum. Her publishing house created limited-edition books that can sell for thousands of pounds a copy.

== Life ==
Shaw was born Susan Mary Mahon on 12 August 1932 at the Royal Buckinghamshire Hospital, Aylesbury to Thomas James Mahon (1904–1981), a civil servant and tax inspector, and Constance Mary Mahon (née Peach; 1904–1982). The second of three sisters, at the time of Shaw's birth the family lived in Leighton Buzzard. Due to her father's work, the family later moved to St Albans before settling in Derby.

She loved books though did not go to university, but worked at Butlin's. She and her sister toured the continent on Vespa scooters.

She entered publishing when she applied to Penguin Books while she was employed by Derby Libraries. She worked for several of leading book publishers.

She founded the Merrion Press, which in 1960 published Wolperiana, featuring drawings made by Charles Mozley of Berthold Wolpe. There were 335 numbered copies, with 150 of them signed by the artist. Wolpe was one of her heroes. He was a Jewish German designer known for creating the Albertus typeface and 1,500 book cover designs for Faber & Faber. Shaw had also worked for many years at Faber. In 1964, she married Montague Shaw and they had two sons, Thomas and Patrick. Both children predeceased their parents.

Her second book was another about design. This time, Merrion Press created a facsimile edition of a book by Johann David Steingrüber, who was an architect. In 1773, he had published a book that featured the designs of letter-shaped houses. The book was called Architectural Alphabet and illustrated Shaw's professional approach to book design.

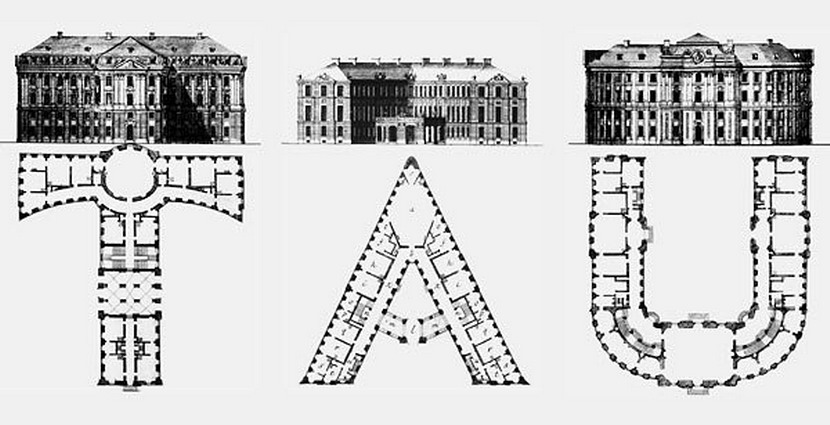
T A U - three building designs by Steingrüber from his 1773 book

In 1992, she founded the Type Museum (now called the Type Archive) in Stockwell in south London. The museum curates the manufacturing plants of type founders and letter makers in a building that was once an animal hospital. The collection was originally based on the equipment of Monotype and Shaw had to fight off suggestions that the equipment should be housed in one of the science museum's warehouses.

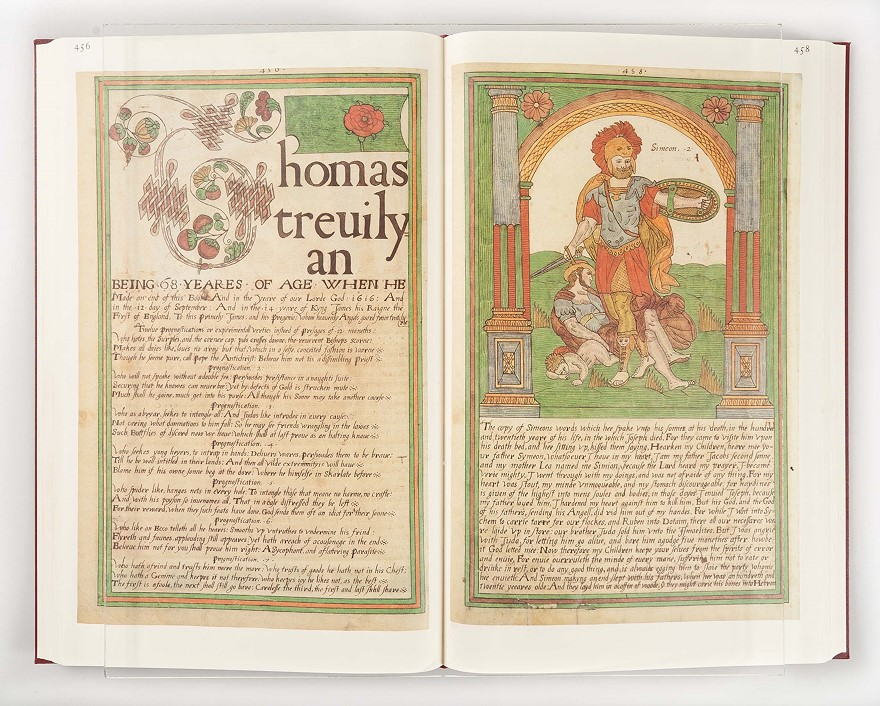
The Great Book of Thomas Trevilian

The Heritage Lottery Fund came to her aid in 1996 so that the machinery and equipment of Stephenson Blake and Robert DeLittle could be loaded up and sent to South London. The museum now has substantial collections from the Sheffield typefounders Stephenson Blake, the York wood letter makers Robert DeLittle and Monotype.

Shaw had an appreciation of design, including the work of Lucie Rie. In time, Rie gave Shaw some bowls, including her own egg cup.

In 2000, she completed the work that she had been given by the Roxburghe Club to publish a facsimile copy of The Great Book of Thomas Trevilian in two volumes, edited by Nicolas Barker. The book was to be given to the club's members. A copy of Shaw's facsimile book in 2020 was on sale for £2,200. The sellers claim that it is "perhaps" the "greatest monument to the arts of the book at the turn of the twentieth century".

In 2016, the address of the Type Archive was changed when the street where it was renamed "Alphabet Mews". When Shaw died in 2020, she was credited with keeping knowledge of "letterpress and type design alive".
