= Thomas Frognall Dibdin =

English bibliographer (1776–1847)

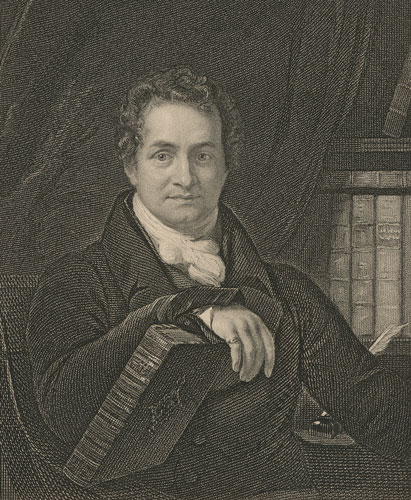
Thomas Frognall Dibdin, engraving by James Thomson after Thomas Phillips.

Thomas Frognall Dibdin (1776 – 18 November 1847) was an English bibliographer, born in Calcutta to Thomas Dibdin, the sailor brother of the composer Charles Dibdin.

Dibdin was orphaned at a young age. His father and mother died in 1780 while returning to England, and an elderly maternal aunt eventually assumed responsibility for Dibdin. He was educated at St John's College, Oxford, and studied for a time at Lincoln's Inn. After an unsuccessful attempt to obtain practice as a provincial counsel at Worcester, he was ordained a clergyman at the close of 1804, being appointed to a curacy at Kensington. It was not until 1823 that he received the living of Exning in Sussex. Soon afterwards he was appointed by Lord Liverpool to the rectory of St Mary's, Bryanston Square, which he held until his death.

The first of his numerous bibliographical works was his Introduction to the Knowledge of Editions of the Classics (1802), which brought him under the notice of the second Earl Spencer, to whom he owed much important aid in his bibliographical pursuits. The rich library at Althorp was thrown open to him; he spent much of his time in it, and in 1814–1815 published his Bibliotheca Spenceriana. As the library was not open to the general public, the information given in the Bibliotheca was found very useful, but since its author was unable even to read the characters in which the books he described were written, the work was marred by the errors which more or less characterize all his productions. This fault of inaccuracy however was less obtrusive in his series of playful, discursive works in the form of dialogues on his favourite subject, the first of which, Bibliomania (1809), was republished with large additions in 1811, and was very popular, passing through numerous editions.

To the same class belonged the Bibliographical Decameron, a larger work, which appeared in 1817. In 1810 he began the publication of a new and much extended edition of Ames's Typographical Antiquities. The first volume was a great success, but the publication was checked by the failure of the fourth volume, and was never completed. In 1818 Dibdin was commissioned by Earl Spencer to purchase books for him on the continent, an expedition described in his sumptuous Bibliographical, Antiquarian and Picturesque Tour in France and Germany (1821). In 1822 Dibdin sold 'the entire collection of original drawings, executed by Lewis, and eminent artists, for the Bibliographical, Antiquarian, and Picturesque Tour, of the Rev. Mr. Dibdin' through London auctioneer R. H. Evans (sale 11–14 February 1822). A copy of the catalogue is in Cambridge University Library at the shelfmark Munby.c.124(9), annotated with prices; the total was £568 1s 6d.

In 1824 he made an ambitious venture in his Library Companion, or the Young Man's Guide and Old Man's Comfort in the Choice of a Library, intended to point out the best works in all departments of literature. His culture was not broad enough, however, to render him competent for the task, and the work was severely criticized. For some years Dibdin gave himself up chiefly to religious literature. He returned to bibliography in his Bibliophobia, or Remarks on the Present Depression in the State of Literature and the Book Trade (1832), and the same subject furnishes the main interest of his Reminiscences of a Literary Life (1836), and his Bibliographical, Antiquarian and Picturesque Tour in the Northern Counties of England and Scotland (1838).

Dibdin was the originator and vice-president—Earl Spencer being the president—of the Roxburghe Club, founded in 1812, the first "book club".
