= Laienspiegel =

1509 German book of law

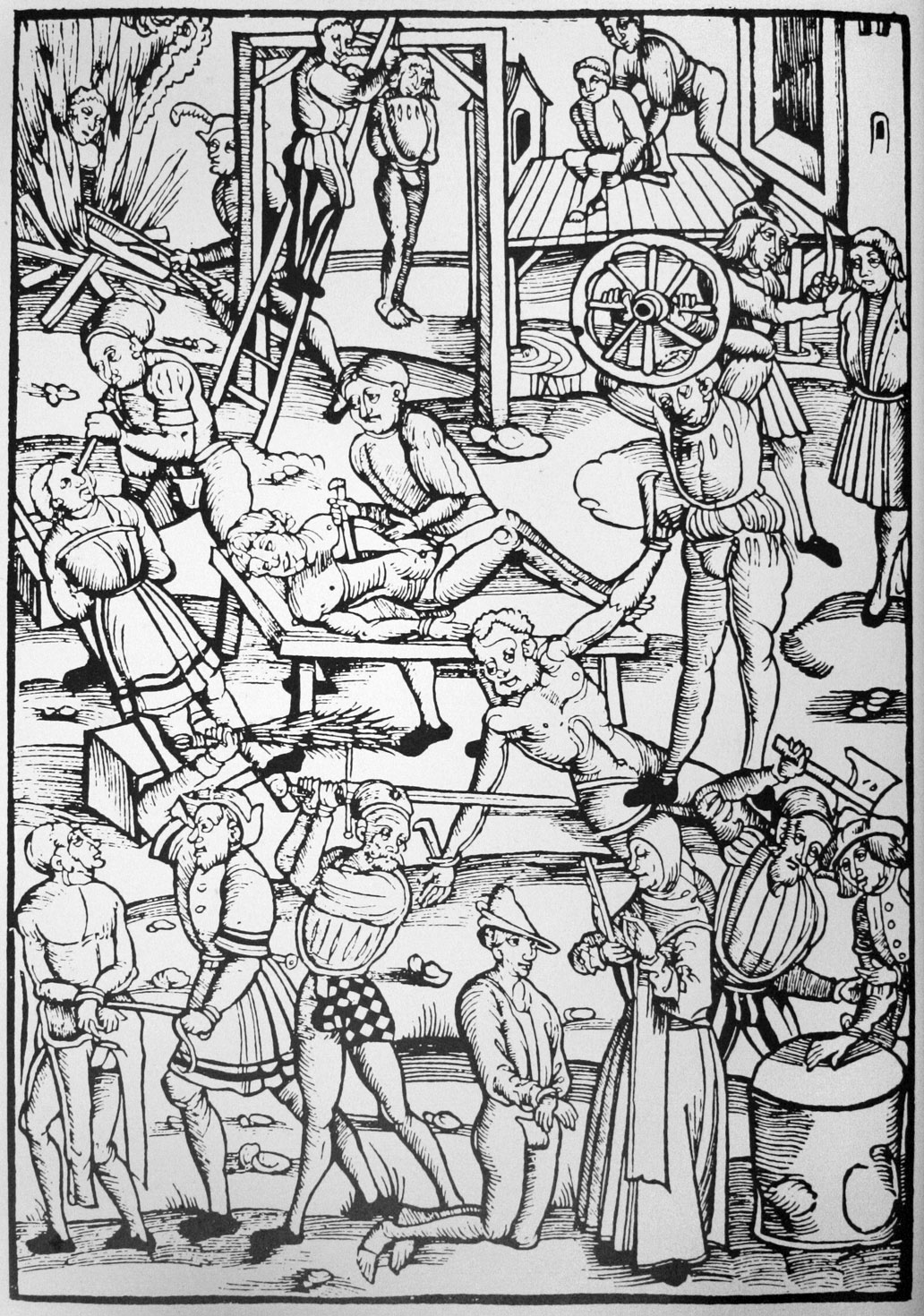
Punishing witches is an illustration from the Laienspiegel

The work commonly referred to as Laienspiegel is a book of law. It was published in Augsburg, in 1509. Its full title is ″Laijen Spiegel. von rechtmässigen ordnungen in Burgerlichen vnd peinlichen regimenten. mit allegation[en] vn[d] bewerungen auß geschribnen rechten vnnd gesatzen“.

This can be roughly translated as A layman's guide, of the correct order of civil and criminal regiments, with illustrations of written rights and laws. It was written by Ulrich Tengler, and published by Sebastian Brant. There was a second edition in 1511. The work was important enough to warrant 14 editions of its publication in the 16th century.

The work is divided in three parts. It contains private law, criminal law, and law of the public institutions. The publication is much like the Klagspiegel of 1436. Other similar works are the Malleus Maleficarum of the 15th century, and the Constitutio Criminalis Bambergensis.
