= Grobian =

Obscure term based on fictional Saint

Saint Grobian (Medieval Latin, Sanctus Grobianus) is a fictional patron saint of vulgar and coarse people. His name is derived from the Middle High German grob or grop, meaning coarse or vulgar. The Old High German cognate is gerob, gerop. The word "grobian" has thus passed into the English language as an obscure word for any crude, sloppy, or buffoonish person.

== History ==
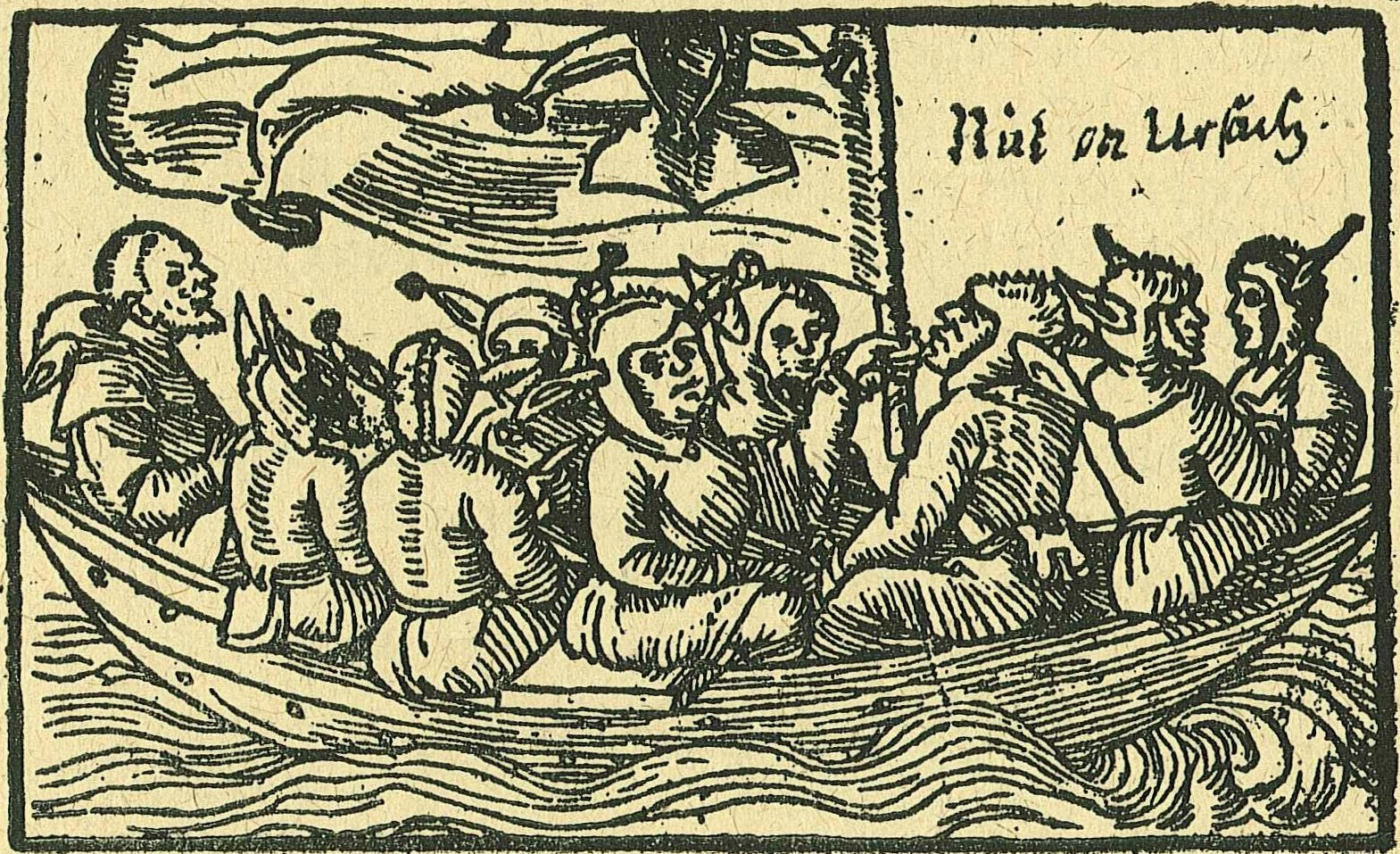
Narrenschiff

The satirist Sebastian Brant (1457–1521) conceived Saint Grobian as the patron saint of coarse manners in his famous poem Das Narrenschiff (1494). Das Narrenschiff (the ship of fools) describes the worship paid to this new saint. Sebastian Brant's allegory was translated into English by Alexander Barclay and Henry Watson as Ship of Fools, both in 1509.

Grobian is found later in several works of the period.

Friedrich Dedekind (1524–1598) published Grobianus et Grobiana: sive, de morum simplicitate, libri tres in 1554 at Cologne. Here Grobian is a counselor who teaches men on how to avoid bad manners, gluttony, and drunkenness.

Dedekind's work appeared in England in 1605 as The Schoole of Slovenrie: Or, Cato turned wrong side outward, published by one "R.F.". The "Schoole" was imagined as a place where one was instructed to use one's greasy fingers to grab at the nicest portions of any dish and snatch food belonging to fellow diners. Holding back the desire to urinate, fart, and vomit is taught to be bad for one's health; thus, one has to indulge freely in all three activities. The work also inspired Thomas Dekker's The Guls Horne-Booke (1609) and the seventeenth-century Icelandic rímur Grobbians rímur.

The German writer Melchior Meyr is the author of a work entitled Gespräche mit einem Grobian (1866).

== Sources ==
- Rod Evans, The Gilded Tongue (Cincinnati: Writers Digest Books, 2006), 59.
