= Henry Watson (printer) =

- Occupations: translator, printer
- Years active: ca. 1500-1518
- Known for: Translations out of French into English
- Notable work: The Ship of Fools, The Distaff Gospels, Valentine and Orson, The Gardeners Pastance

Henry Watson was an English translator and printer active in London during the early years of the 16th century.

== Life and works ==
Between 1500 and 1518, Watson translated books from French to English for the London-based printer Wynkyn de Worde, for whom he worked as his first apprentice, most likely between 1501 or 1502 until 1509 or 1510. After his apprenticeship, Watson was equipped by de Worde with a set of printing fonts upon leaving his apprenticeship, a practice that seemed common for de Worde. This font was sold in order to invest in a newer one, and to publish a pamphlet entitled The Gardeners Pastance together with Hugo Goes, a younger apprentice of de Worde, in 1513. This establishes Watson as the first native English stationer who was also recognized as a printer. There are no further records of Watson after 1518.

Watson translated works from French to English. For the most part, these were romances, such as his first translation Valentine and Orson, but also satirical works such as The Distaff Gospels. A translation of a part of a sermon by Bernardino da Siena survives in The Church of Evil Men and Women. In July 1509, his English prose translation of Sebastian Brant’s satirical work Ship of Fools was published by de Worde, entitled The shyppe of fooles, under the patronage of Margaret Beaufort. This was based on the French prose translation by Jean Drouyn. Just a few months later, in December 1509, another translation of the Ship by Alexander Barclay appeared. A reprint of Watson's Ship was issued 1517, suggesting that this version was more popular initially than Barclay's, which was only reprinted in 1570. The translations of the Ship of Fools proved influential on English literature, giving rise to a "whole school of fool’s literature" as well as playing an important part in the rediscovery of German literary works in England.
