= Renaissance humanism in Northern Europe =

Renaissance humanism came much later to Germany and Northern Europe in general than to Italy, and when it did, it encountered some resistance from the scholastic theology which reigned at the universities. Humanism may be dated from the invention of the printing press about 1450. Its flourishing period began at the close of the 15th century and lasted only until about 1520, when it was absorbed by the more popular and powerful religious movement, the Reformation, as Italian humanism was superseded by the papal counter-Reformation.

However, the Netherlands was influenced by humanism and the Renaissance until arguably roughly 1550.

Marked features distinguished the new culture north of the Alps from the culture of the Italians. The university and school played a much more important part than in the South according to Catholic historians. The representatives of the new scholarship were teachers; even Erasmus taught in Cambridge and was on intimate terms with the professors at Basel. During the progress of the movement new universities sprang up, from Basel to Rostock. Again, in Germany, there were no princely patrons of arts and learning to be compared in intelligence and munificence to the Renaissance popes and the Medici. Nor was the new culture here exclusive and aristocratic. It sought the general spread of intelligence, and was active in the development of primary and grammar schools. In fact, when the currents of the Italian Renaissance began to set toward the North, a strong, independent, intellectual current was pushing down from the flourishing schools conducted by the Brethren of the Common Life. In the humanistic movement, the German people was far from being a slavish imitator. It received an impulse from the South, but made its own path.

== Overview ==
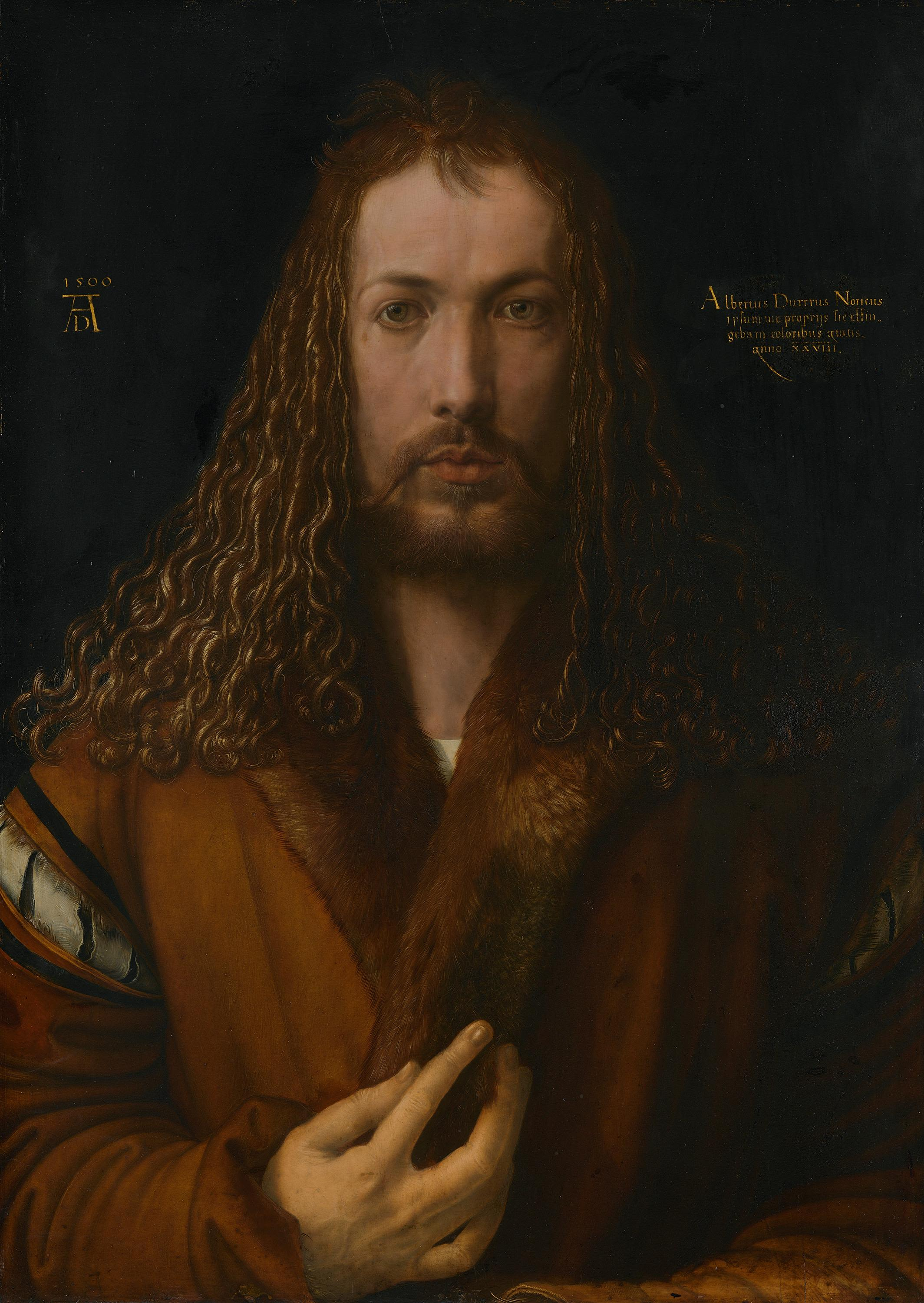
Albrecht Dürer, self-portrait, 1500

In the North, humanism entered into the service of religious progress. German scholars were less brilliant and elegant, but more serious in their purpose and more exact in their scholarship than their Italian predecessors and contemporaries. In the South, the ancient classics absorbed the attention of the literati. It was not so in the North. There was no consuming passion to render the classics into German as there had been in Italy. Nor did Italian literature, with its often relaxed moral attitude, find imitators in the North. Giovanni Boccaccio’s Decameron was first translated into German by the physician, Henry Stainhowel, who died in 1482. North of the Alps, attention was chiefly centred on the Old and New Testaments. Greek and Hebrew were studied, not with the purpose of ministering to a cult of antiquity, but to reach the fountains of the Christian system more adequately. In this way, preparation was made for the work of the Protestant Reformation. This focus on translation was a feature of the Christian humanists who helped to launch the new, post-scholastic era, among them Erasmus and Luther. In so doing, they also placed biblical texts above any human or institutional authority, an approach that emphasised the role of the reader in understanding a text for him or herself. Closely allied to the late medieval shift of scholarship from the monastery to the university, Christian humanism engendered a new freedom of expression, even though some of its proponents opposed that freedom of expression elsewhere, such as in their censure of the Anabaptists.

What was true of the scholarship of Germany was also true of its art. The painters, Albrecht Dürer (1471–1528), who was born and died at Nuremberg, Lucas Cranach the Elder (1472–1553), and for the most part Hans Holbein the Younger (1497–1543), took little interest in mythology, apart from Cranach's nudes, and were persuaded by the Reformation, though most continued to take commissions for traditional Catholic subjects. Dürer and Holbein had close contacts with leading humanists. Cranach lived in Wittenberg after 1504 and painted portraits of Martin Luther, Philip Melanchthon and other leaders of the German Reformation. Holbein made frontispieces and illustrations for Protestant books and painted portraits of Erasmus and Melanchthon.

== The Italian roots of humanism in Germany ==
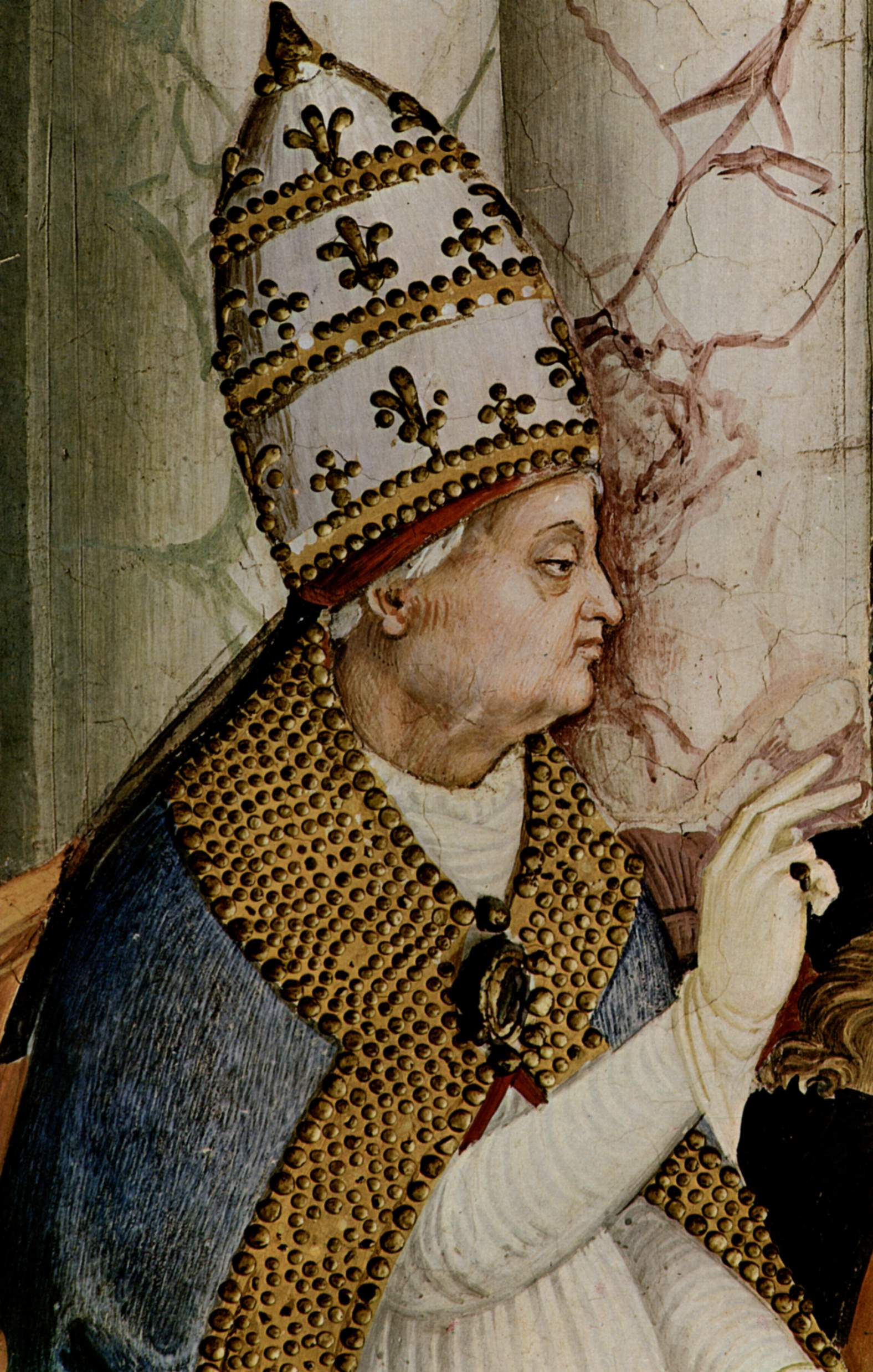
Pope Pius II

If any one individual more than another may be designated as the connecting link between the learning of Italy and Germany, it is Aeneas Sylvius. By his residence at the court of Frederick III and at Basel, as one of the secretaries of the council, he became a well-known character north of the Alps long before he was chosen pope. The mediation, however, was not effected by any single individual. The fame of the Renaissance was carried over the pathways of trade which led from Northern Italy to Augsburg, Nuremberg, Konstanz and other German cities. The visits of Frederick III and the campaigns of Charles VIII and the ascent of the throne of Naples by the princes of Aragon carried Germans, Frenchmen and Spaniards to the greater centres of the peninsula. A constant stream of pilgrims travelled to Rome and the Spanish popes drew to the city throngs of Spaniards. As the fame of Italian culture spread, scholars and artists began to travel to Venice, Florence and Rome, and caught the inspiration of the new era.

To the Italians, Germany was a land of barbarians. They despised the German people for their rudeness and intemperance in eating and drinking. Aeneas was impressed by the beauty of Vienna, though it was quite small when compared to the greatest Italian cities. However, he found that the German princes and nobles cared more for horses and dogs than for poets and scholars and loved their wine-cellars better than the muses. Campanus, a witty poet of the papal court, who was sent as legate to the Diet of Regensburg (1471) by Pope Paul II, and afterwards was made a bishop by Pope Pius II, abused Germany for its dirt, cold climate, poverty, sour wine and miserable fare. He lamented his unfortunate nose, which had to smell everything, and praised his ears, which understood nothing. Johannes Santritter, himself being a German living in Italy, admitted that Italy was slightly ahead of Germany in the humanities. However, he also contended that many Italians were jealous of German science and technology, which he considered superior taking the examples of the printing press and the work of the astronomer Regiomontanus.

Such impressions were soon offset by the sound scholarship which arose in Germany and the Netherlands. And, if Italy contributed to Germany an intellectual impulse, Germany sent out to the world the printing press, the most important agent in the history of intellectual culture since the invention of the alphabet.

== Universities ==
Before the first swell of the new movement was felt, the older German universities were already established: University of Vienna in 1365, University of Heidelberg in 1386, University of Cologne in 1388, University of Erfurt in 1392, University of Würzburg in 1402, University of Leipzig in 1409, and University of Rostock in 1419. During the last half of the 15th century, more were quickly added to this list of universities at Greifswald and Freiburg 1457, Trier 1457, Basel 1459, Ingolstadt 1472, Tübingen, Mainz 1477, and Wittenberg 1502. Ingolstadt lost its distinct existence in 1826 by incorporation in LMU Munich, and Wittenberg by removal from Halle.

Most of these universities had the four faculties, although the popes were slow to give their assent to the sanction of the theological department, as in the case of Vienna and Rostock, where the charter of the secular prince authorized their establishment. Whereas the religious influence of the age were strong, this held by no means for the social and moral habits of the students such as to call for praise. Parents, Luther said, by sending their sons to the universities, were sending them into destruction, and an act of the Leipzig university, dating from the closing of the 15th century, stated that students came forth obedient and pious from their homes, but "how they returned, only God knew", to university archives and libraries.

In the Netherlands, universities or "Latin schools" spurred on by Renaissance humanists helped the majority of people in the region become more literate than in most other European kingdoms.

== Education ==
The theological teaching was ruled by the Schoolmen, and the dialectic method prevailed in all departments. In clashing with the scholastic method and curricula, the new teaching met with many a repulse, and in no case was it thoroughly triumphant till the era of the Reformation opened. Erfurt may be regarded as having been the first to give the new culture a welcome. In 1466, it received Peter Luder of Kislau, who had visited Greece and Asia Minor, and had been previously appointed to a chair in Heidelberg, 1456. He read on Virgil, Jerome, Ovid and other Latin writers. There Agricola studied and there Greek was taught by Nicolas Marschalck, under whose supervision the first Greek book printed in Germany issued from the press, 1501. There John of Wesel taught. It was Luther's alma mater and, among his professors, he singled out Trutvetter for special mention as the one who directed him to the study of the Scriptures.

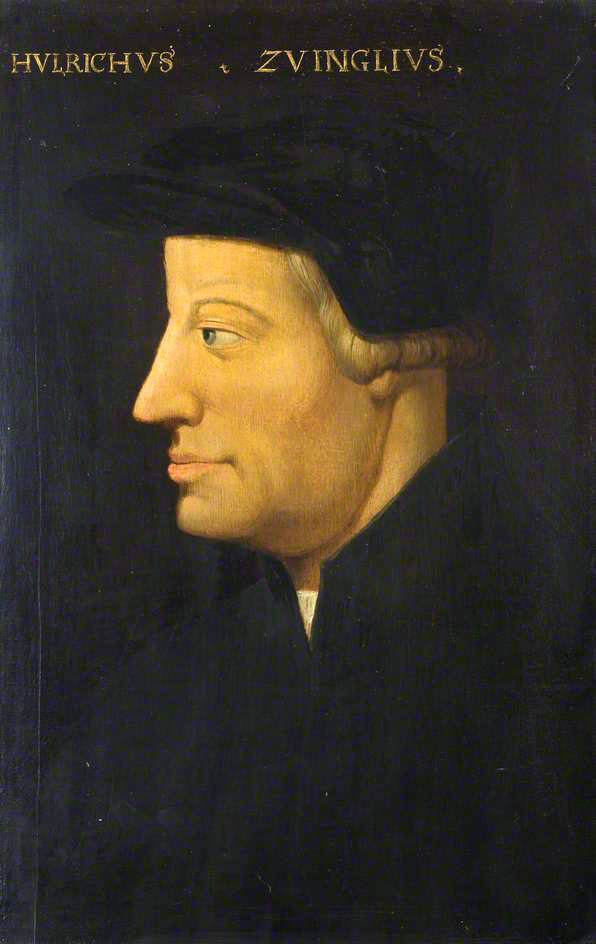
Portrait of Huldrych Zwingli by Hans Asper

Heidelberg, chartered by the elector Ruprecht I and Pope Urban VI, showed scant sympathy with the new movement. However, the elector-palatine, Philip, 1476–1508, gathered at his court some of its representatives, among them Reuchlin. Ingolstadt for a time had Reuchlin as professor and, in 1492, Conrad Celtes was appointed professor of poetry and eloquence.

In 1474, a chair of poetry was established at Basel. Founded by Pius II, it had among its early teachers two Italians, Finariensis and Publicius. Sebastian Brant taught there at the close of the century and among its notable students were Reuchlin and the Reformers, Leo Jud and Zwingli. In 1481, Tübingen had a stipend of oratoria. Here Gabriel Biel taught till very near the close of the century. The year after Biel's death, Heinrich Bebel was called to lecture on poetry. One of Bebel's distinguished pupils was Philip Melanchthon, who studied and taught in the university, 1512–1518. Reuchlin was called from Ingolstadt to Tübingen, 1521, to teach Hebrew and Greek, but died a few months later.

Leipzig and Cologne remained inaccessible strongholds of scholasticism, till Luther appeared, when Leipzig changed front. The last German university of the Middle Ages, Wittenberg, founded by Frederick the Wise and placed under the patronage of the Virgin Mary and St. Augustine, acquired a worldwide influence through its professors, Luther and Melanchthon. Not till 1518, did it have instruction in Greek, when Melanchthon, soon to be the chief Greek scholar in Germany, was called to one of its chairs at the age of 21. According to Luther, his lecture-room was at once filled brimful, theologians high and low resorting to it.

As seats of the new culture, Nuremberg and Strasbourg occupied, perhaps, even a more prominent place than any of the university towns. These two cities, with Basel and Augsburg, had the most prosperous German printing establishments. At the close of the 15th century, Nuremberg, the fountain of inventions, had four Latin schools and was the home of Albrecht Dürer the painter and his friend Willibald Pirkheimer, a patron of learning.

Popular education, during the century before the Reformation, was far more advanced in Germany than in other nations. Apart from the traditional monastic and civic schools, the Brothers of the Common Life had schools at Zwolle, Deventer, 's-Hertogenbosch and Liège in the Low Countries. All the leading towns had schools. The town of Sélestat in Alsace was noted as a classical centre. Here, Thomas Platter found Hans Sapidus teaching, and he regarded it as the best school he had found. In 1494, there were five pedagogues in Wesel, teaching reading, writing, arithmetic and singing. One Christmas the clergy of the place entertained the pupils, giving them each cloth for a new coat and a piece of money as begun with the 4th class.

Among the noted schoolmasters was Alexander Hegius, who taught at Deventer for nearly a quarter of a century, till his death in 1498. At the age of 40 he was not ashamed to sit at the feet of Agricola. He made the classics central in education and banished the old text-books. Trebonius, who taught Luther at Eisenach, belonged to a class of worthy men. The penitential books of the day called upon parents to be diligent in keeping their children off the streets and sending them to school.

== Leaders of Northern humanism ==
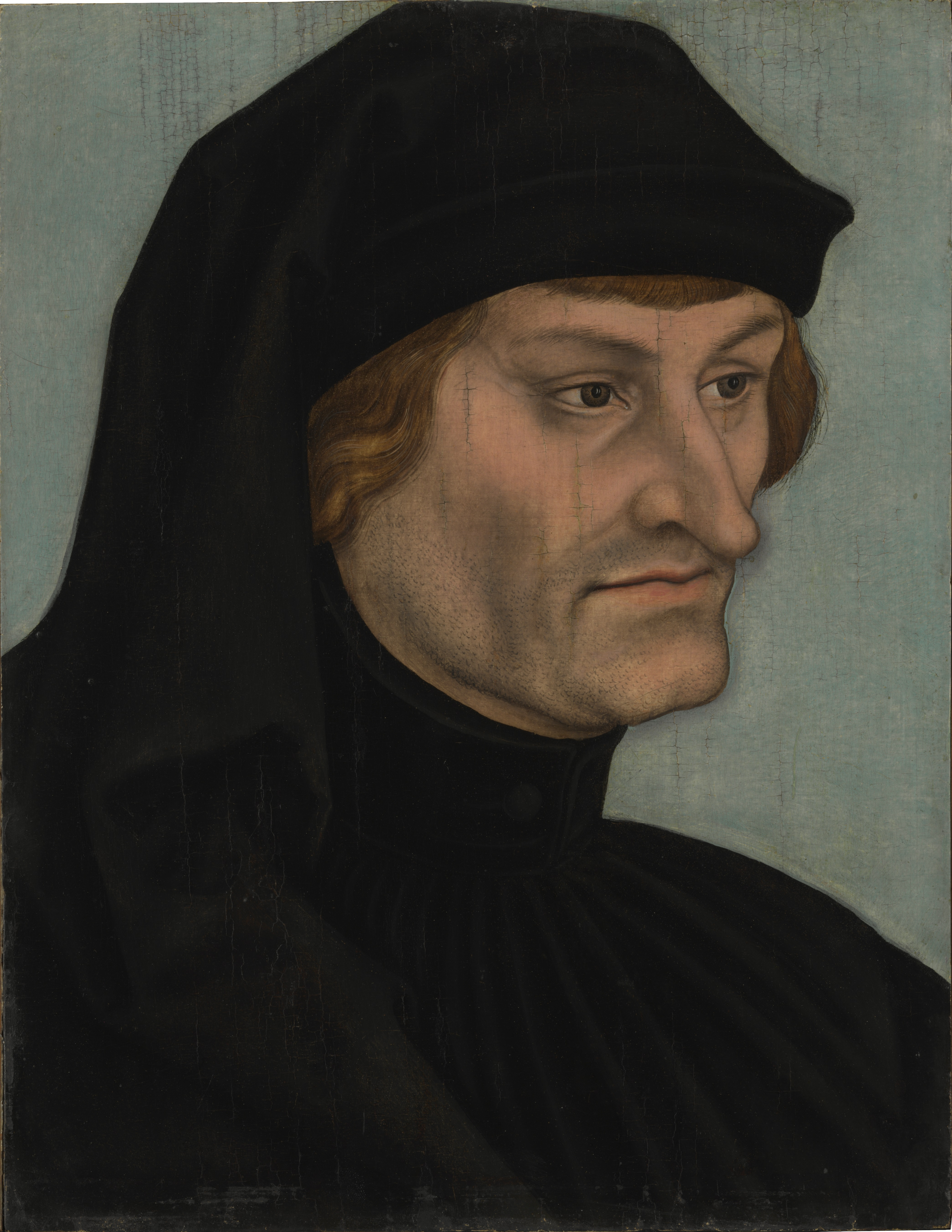
Portrait of Rudolph Agricola by Lucas Cranach the Elder, ca. 1532

The leading Northern humanists included Rudolph Agricola, Reuchlin and Erasmus. Agricola, whose original name was Roelef Huisman, was born near Groningen in 1443 and died 1485. He enjoyed the highest reputation in his day as a scholar and received unstinted praise from Erasmus and Melanchthon. He has been regarded as doing for Humanism in Germany what was done in Italy by Petrarch, the first biography of whom, in German, Agricola prepared. After studying in Erfurt, Louvain and Cologne, Agricola went to Italy, spending some time at the universities in Pavia and Ferrara. He declined a professor's chair in favor of an appointment at the court of Philip of the Palatinate in Heidelberg. He made Cicero and Quintilian his models. In his last years, he turned his attention to theology and studied Hebrew. Like Pico della Mirandola, he was a monk. The inscription on his tomb in Heidelberg stated that he had studied what is taught about God and the true faith of the Saviour in the books of Scripture.

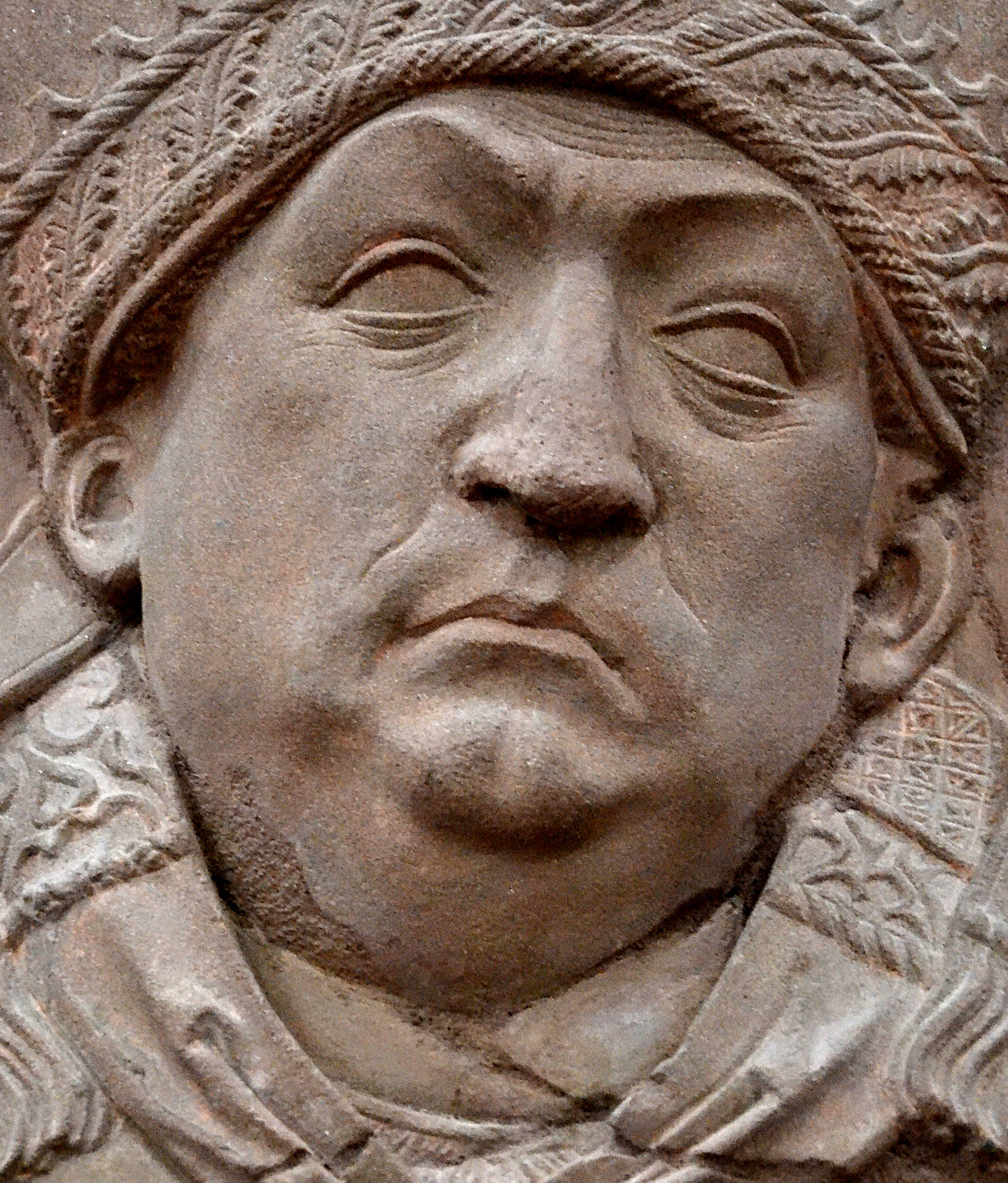
Johannes Trithemius by Tilman Riemenschneider

Another Humanist was Jacob Wimpheling, 1450–1528, of Schlettstadt, who taught in Heidelberg. He was inclined to be severe on clerical abuses but, at the close of his career, wanted to substitute for the study of Virgil and Horace, Sedulius and Prudentius. The poetic Sebastian Brant, 1457–1521, the author of the Ship of Fools, began his career as a teacher of law in Basel. Mutianus Rufus, in his correspondence, went so far as to declare that Christianity is as old as the world and that Jupiter, Apollo, Ceres and Christ are only different names of the one hidden God.

A name which deserves a high place in the German literature of the last years of the Middle Ages is John Trithemius, 1462–1516, abbot of a Benedictine convent at Sponheim, which, under his guidance, gained the reputation of a learned academy. He gathered a library of 2,000 volumes and wrote a patrology, or encyclopaedia of the Fathers, and a catalogue of the renowned men of Germany. Increasing differences with the convent led to his resignation in 1506, when he decided to take up the offer of the Lord Bishop of Würzburg, Lorenz von Bibra (bishop from 1495 to 1519), to become abbot of the Schottenkloster in Würzburg. He remained there until the end of his life. Prelates and nobles visited him to consult and read the Latin and Greek authors he had collected. These men and others contributed their part to that movement of which Reuchlin and Erasmus were the chief lights and which led to the Protestant Reformation.

== See also ==
- German new humanism
- German Renaissance
- Northern Renaissance
- Renaissance in the Low Countries

== Sources ==
- Philip Schaff, History of the Christian Church, Volume VI, 1882.
