= Alexander Barclay =

Clergyman of the Church of England

- Born: c. 1476
- Died: 10 June 1552 (aged c. 75); Croydon, Surrey
- Occupations: Poet, clergyman
- Notable work: The Ship of Fools (1509)

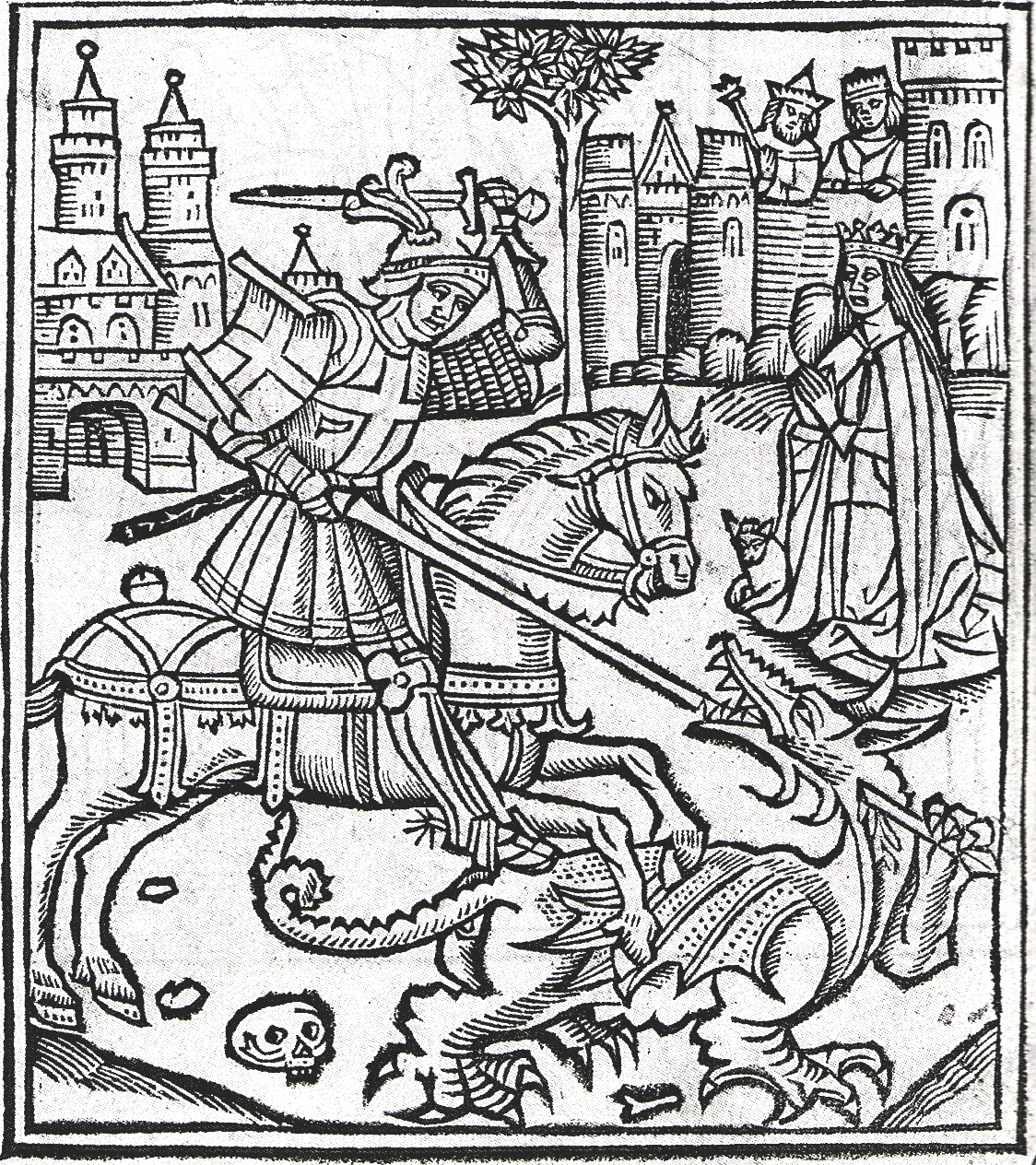
Woodcut frontispiece from Alexander Barclay's Lyfe of Seynt George (Westminster, 1515)

Dr Alexander Barclay (c. 1476 – 10 June 1552) was a poet and clergyman of the Church of England, probably born in Scotland.

== Biography ==
Barclay was born in about 1476. His place of birth is a matter of dispute, but William Bulleyn, who was a native of Ely, and probably knew him when he was in the monastery there, asserts that he was born "beyonde the cold river of Twede" (i.e., in Scotland). His early life was spent at Croydon, but it is not certain whether he was educated at Oxford or Cambridge. It may be presumed that he took his degree, as he uses the title of "Syr" in his translation of Sallust's Bellum Jugurthinum, and in his will he is called Doctor of Divinity.

From the numerous incidental references in his works, and from his knowledge of European literature, it may be inferred that he spent some time abroad. Thomas Cornish, suffragan bishop in the diocese of Bath and Wells, and provost of Oriel College, Oxford, from 1493 to 1507, appointed him chaplain of the college of Ottery St Mary, Devon. Here he wrote his satirical poem, The Ship of Fools, partly a translation from Sebastian Brant.

The death of his patron in 1513 apparently put an end to his connection with the west, and he became a monk in the Benedictine monastery of Ely. In this retreat he probably wrote his eclogues. He left Ely to join the Franciscan order. In 1520 "Maistre Barkleye, the Blacke Monke and Poete" was desired to devise "histoires and convenient raisons to florisshe the buildings and banquet house withal" at the meeting between Henry VIII and Francis I of France at the Field of the Cloth of Gold. He at length became a Franciscan friar of Canterbury.

It is presumed that he conformed with the change of religion, for he retained under Edward VI the livings of Great Baddow, Essex, and of Wokey, Somerset, which he had received in 1546, and was presented in 1552 by the dean and chapter of Canterbury to the rectory of All Hallows, Lombard Street, London. He died shortly after this last preferment at Croydon, Surrey, where he was buried on 10 June 1552.

== Works ==
The Ship of Fools was as popular in its two English dresses as it had been in Germany; published in December 1509, another Ship was published mere months before Barclay's in June by Henry Watson. It was the starting-point of a new satirical literature. In itself a product of the medieval conception of the fool who figured so largely in the Shrovetide and other pageants, it differs entirely from the general allegorical satires of the preceding centuries. The figures are no longer abstractions; they are concrete examples of the folly of the bibliophile who collects books but learns nothing from them, of the evil judge who takes bribes to favour the guilty, of the old fool whom time merely strengthens in his folly, of those who are eager to follow the fashions, of the priests who spend their time in church telling "gestes" of Robin Hood and so forth. Thus, the work is of interest as throwing light on the manners and customs of the times to which it refers.

Barclay wrote the Life of St George (c. 1515) for Thomas Howard, 3rd Duke of Norfolk with a dedication to Nicholas West. He translated the Mirrour of Good Manners (c. 1518), from the Italian of Dominic Mancini. This work was written at the command of Sir Giles Alington.

Most of Barclay's works were made in collaboration with the printer Richard Pynson. He wrote five Eclogues, part printed by Wynkyn de Worde around 1518, and printed in full in John Cawood's 1570 edition. The sources of the Eclogues include works by Aeneas Silvius Piccolomini, Baptista Mantuanus, and Jean Lemaire de Belges. The Eclogues include laments for John Alcock, John Morton, and Roger Westminster, Prior of Ely.
