= Ship of Fools (satire) =

1494 allegory by Sebastian Brant

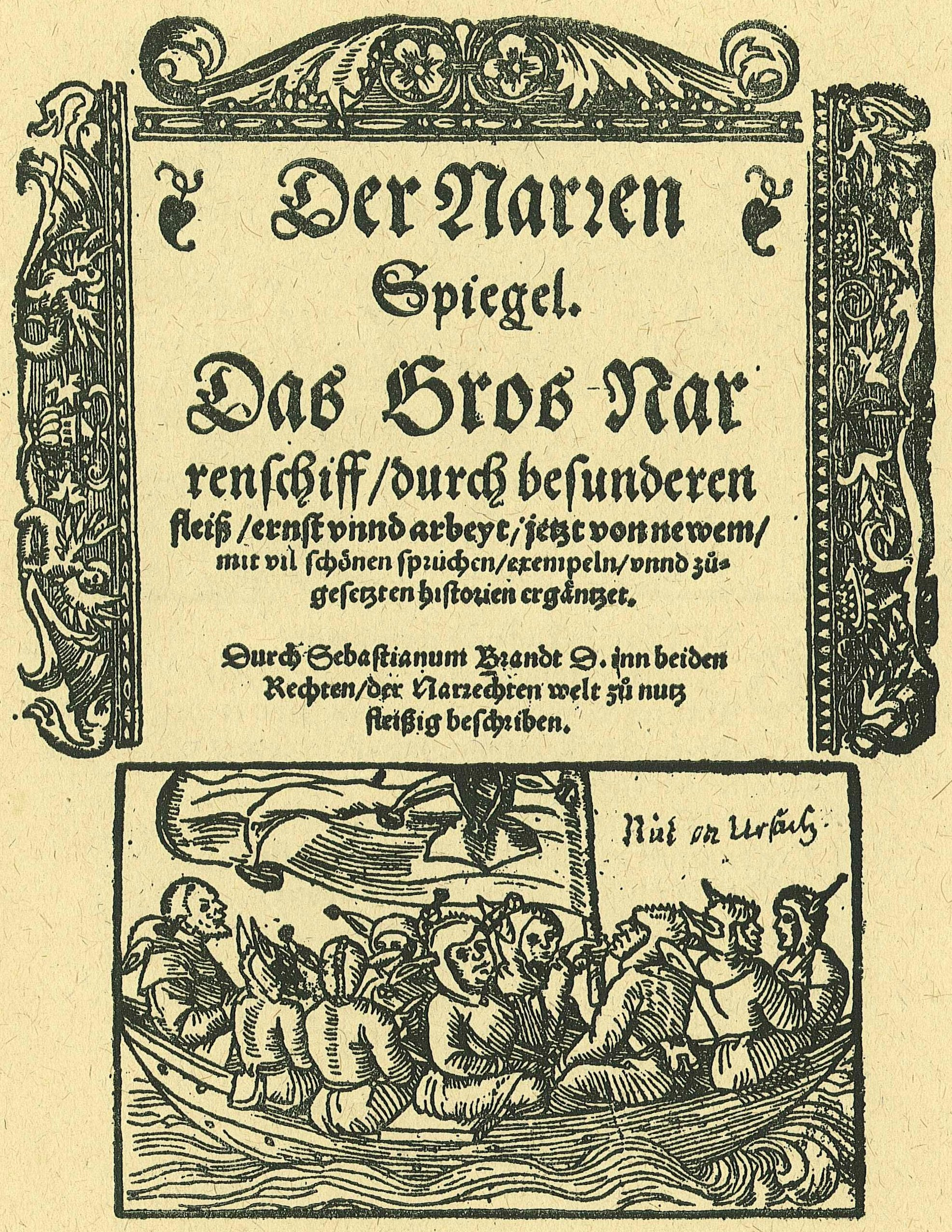
Title page of a 1549 edition of Ship of Fools.

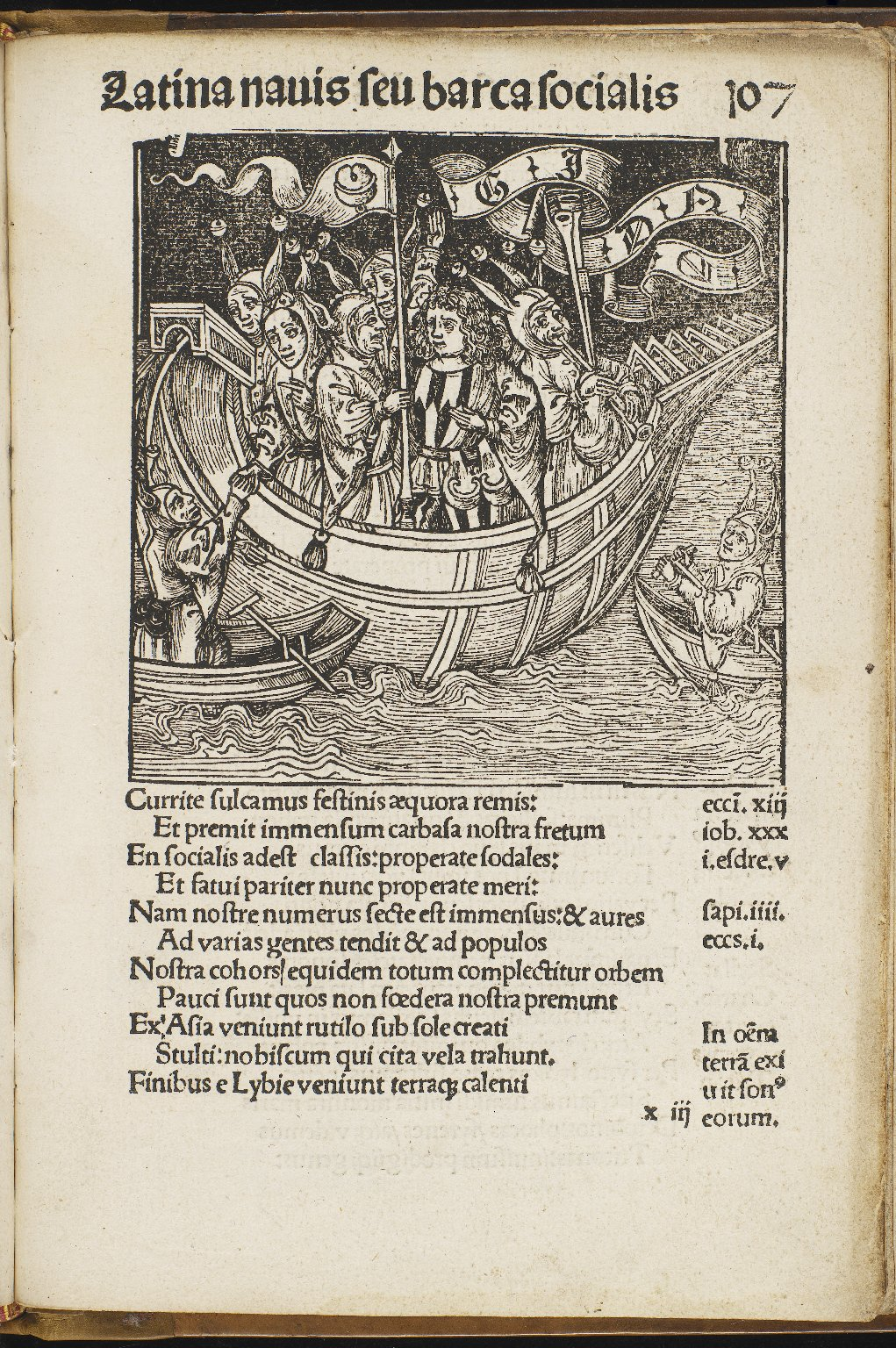
Ship of Fools (Stultifera Navis) was translated into Latin in 1497; some of the woodcuts illustrating the manuscript may have been created by Albrecht Dürer. The University of Edinburgh holds a copy of the Latin edition.

Ship of Fools (Modern German: Das Narrenschiff; Latin: Stultifera Navis; original medieval German title: Daß Narrenschyff ad Narragoniam) is a satirical allegory in German verse published in 1494 in Basel, Switzerland, by the humanist and theologian Sebastian Brant. It is the most famous treatment of the ship of fools trope and circulated in numerous translations.

== Overview ==
The Ship of Fools was published in 1494 in Basel, Switzerland, by Sebastian Brant. It was printed by Michael Furter for Johann Bergann von Olpe. The book consists of a prologue, 112 brief satires, and an epilogue, all illustrated with woodcuts. Brant takes up the ship of fools trope, popular at the time, lashing with unsparing vigor the weaknesses and vices of his time. He conceives Saint Grobian, whom he imagines to be the patron saint of vulgar and coarse people.

The concept of foolishness was a frequently used trope in the pre-Reformation period to legitimize criticism, as also used by Erasmus in his Praise of Folly and Martin Luther in his "An den christlichen Adel deutscher Nation von des christlichen Standes Besserung" (Address to the Christian Nobility). Court fools were allowed to say much what they wanted; by writing his work in the voice of the fool, Brant could legitimize his criticism of the church. The abbot of Sponheim Johannes Trithemius lamented Brant's title choice and would have preferred the book to be called Divina Satyra. He compared the work to Dante Alighieri's Divina Commedia for the use in both of their local languages. The educator Jacob Wimpfeling deemed the book worthy to be taught in school and Ulrich von Hutten praised Brant for his mixture of classical metrics with a barbarian dialect and the organization of the poetry in the Ship of Fools.

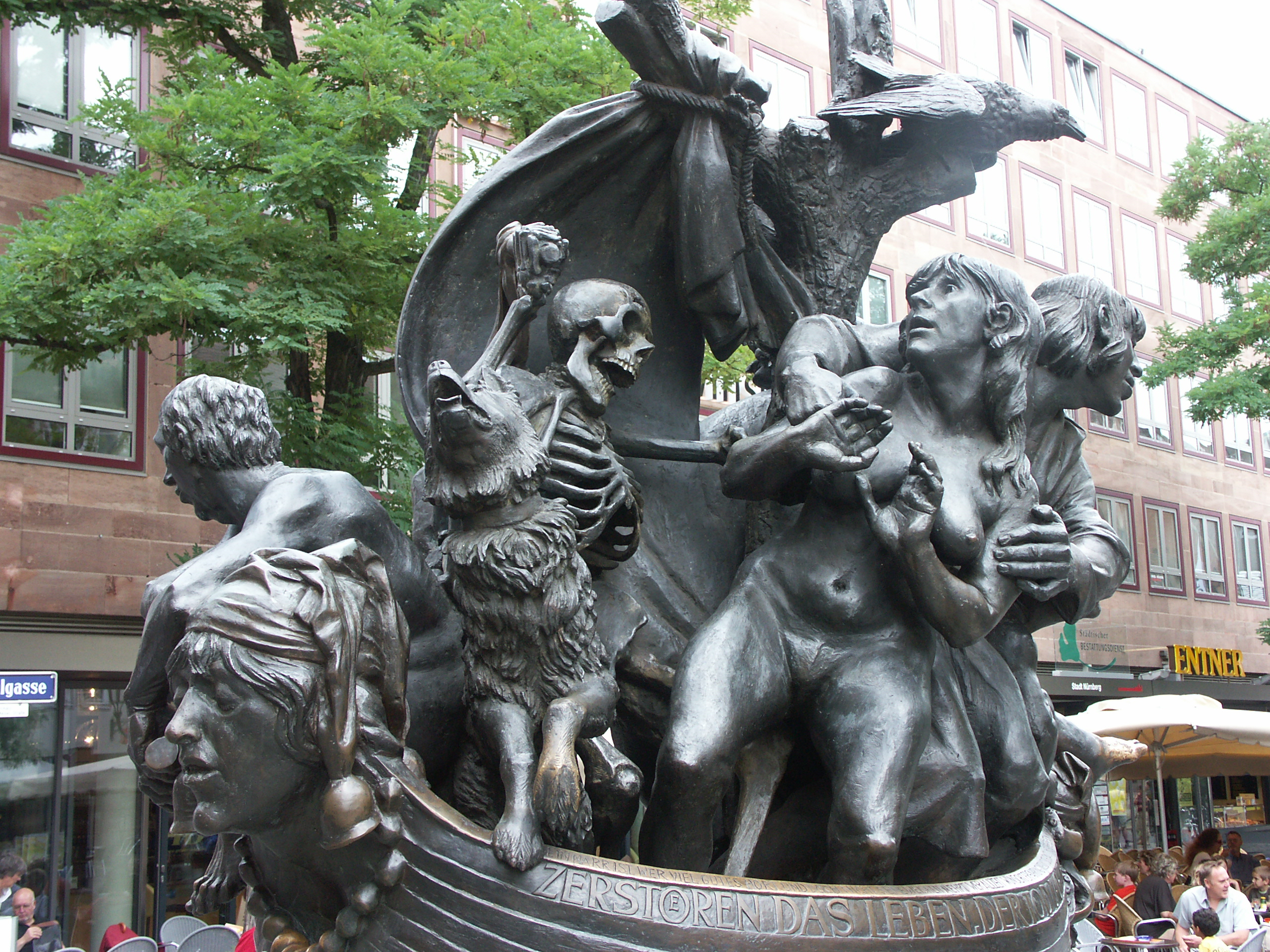
Sculpture of Jürgen Weber based on the satire, located in Nuremberg, home of Albrecht Dürer.

The work immediately became extremely popular, being published in Reutlingen, Nuremberg, Strasbourg and Augsburg, with six authorized and several unauthorized editions until 1512. Brant's own views on humanism and the new, revolutionary views on Christianity emerging in the 16th century are unclear. The debate still continues about whether Ship of Fools is itself a humanist work or just a remnant of medieval sensibilities.

The book was translated into Latin by Jakob Locher in 1497, into French by Pierre Rivière in 1497 and by Jean Drouyn in 1498, into English by Alexander Barclay and by Henry Watson in 1509.

Of the 103 woodcuts, two-thirds are attributed to the young Albrecht Dürer, and the additional wood-cuts are the work of the so-called Haintz-Nar-Meister, the gnad-her-Meister and two other anonymous artists.

An allegorical painting by Hieronymus Bosch, The Ship of Fools, a fragment of a triptych said to have been painted by Bosch between 1490 and 1500, may have been influenced by the frontispiece for the book. The painting is on display in the Louvre Museum in Paris.

== Modern interpretations ==
Some 20th-century artists, including Art Hazelwood, Dušan Kállay, István Orosz, Richard Rappaport, Brian Williams, made images based on Das Narrenschiff, or drew illustrations for contemporary editions of The Ship of Fools.

== Translations ==
=== Translations into English ===
- Barclay, Alexander (1509). The Ship of Fooles. London: Richard Pynson.
- Watson, Henry (1509). The Shyppe of Fooles. London: Wynkyn de Worde.
- Zeydel, Edwin (1944). The Ship of Fools. New York: Columbia University Press.
