= The Silver River =

Opera by Bright Sheng

The Silver River (1997) is an American chamber opera in one act, with music composed by Bright Sheng, and a libretto by the playwright David Henry Hwang. It was first performed at the Santa Fe, New Mexico Chamber Music Festival in 1997. It also has been performed at the Spoleto Festival in Charleston, South Carolina; and in major cities such as New York City, Chicago, Philadelphia (at the Prince Music Theater), and London.

== Plot ==
The Silver River is a chamber opera combining Western opera, drama, and dance with Chinese opera and virtuosic solo playing of the pipa (Chinese lute). The story is based on a 4,000-year-old Chinese folktale about the creation of Night and Day, a story of star-crossed lovers. "The Silver River" is the Chinese name for what is known in the West as the "Milky Way", the galaxy of the Solar System. In Chinese tradition, the Silver River bathed heaven and Earth in constant light and connected both realms, allowing earthly and celestial creatures to meet. The Jade Emperor, Lord of Heaven, dreams of a chaos that plunges heaven and Earth into darkness.

His nightmare comes true when the mortal Cowherd (also known as Buffalo Boy in China) falls in love with the immortal Goddess-Weaver. When love distracts the Goddess-Weaver from her duty to spin the stars of heaven, the skies begin to darken. In this version, her father the Jade Emperor turns the Silver River into a barrier separating heaven and earth. The lovers' grief is so great that chaos reigns until the Jade Emperor allows the lovers to meet each other once a year (the seventh day of the seventh moon of the lunar calendar) on the banks of the Silver River.

There is no current recording.

== Soloists and orchestration ==
=== Soloists ===
- African-American Actress (Western style)
- Asian Male Singer (Chinese Opera style)
- Baritone (Western Opera/Music Theater style)
- Asian Female Dancer
- 2 Dancers
- Baritone

=== Orchestration ===
- Flute, doubling piccolo and alto flute
- Clarinet, doubling bass clarinet and percussion
- Pipa
- Percussion
- Violin, doubling percussion
- Cello, doubling percussion

The flutist appears onstage as a male cowherd; the pipa player appears onstage as the Goddess-Weaver.

== See also ==
- The Cowherd and the Weaver Girl
