= The Distaff Gospels =

1480 collection of popular beliefs

The Distaff Gospels (Les Évangiles des quenouilles) is a fifteenth-century Old French collection of popular beliefs held by late medieval women, first published in 1479. It was edited by Fouquart de Cambray, Duval Antoine and Jean d'Arras and published at Bruges by Colart Mansion. The narrative takes place within a frame narrative of a gathering of women who meet with their spindles and distaffs to spin. Recorded by a clerk, they discuss folk wisdom related to their domestic lives, including controlling errant husbands, predicting the gender of future offspring, sexual remedies and curing common ailments.

The text is ironic in tone which mocks both the ecclesiastical tradition and the women. It is arranged into "gospels" and "glosses": The former are proclamations of popular beliefs by one of the women, the latter discussion of this knowledge by the women. In keeping with anti-female traditions of medieval writing, the narrative voice (the clerk) mocks and distances himself from these "gospels". Scholars are divided on whether the "gospels" accurately represent folklore for and by women from that period or if they are intended for misogynistic and comedic effect.

== Editions ==
- Les évangiles des quenouilles. Paris: P. Jannet, 1855
- Les Evangiles des quenouilles; édition critique, introduction et notes par Madeleine Jeay. Paris; Montréal: Librairie philosophique J. Vrin; Presses de l'Université de Montréal, 1985
- Les Evangiles des quenouilles; traduits et présentés par Jacques Lacarrière. Paris: A. Michel, 1998

=== English translations ===
- The gospelles of dystaues. London: Wynkyn de Worde, [c. 1508] (translated by Henry Watson)
- Jeay, Madeleine and Kathleen Garay, eds. and trans. 2006.The Distaff Gospels. Peterborough, ON: Broadview Press.
