= Spindle, Shuttle, and Needle =

German fairy tale

Folk tale
- Name: Spindle, Shuttle, and Needle
- Aarne–Thompson grouping: ATU 585
- Country: Germany
- Published in: Grimms' Fairy Tales

"Spindle, Shuttle, and Needle" is a German fairy tale collected by the Brothers Grimm, tale number 188.

It is Aarne-Thompson type 585.

== Synopsis ==
A girl whose parents died and was raised by her godmother, who later died, leaving the girl the house and a spindle, a shuttle, and a needle to earn her living, which the girl easily does. One day, a king's son came looking for a bride. He wanted one who was at once the richest and the poorest. In this village, they pointed out the richest girl, and then the orphan girl. He rode by the richest girl, who bowed to him, and he rode on. He rode by the poorest girl, who was spinning. When she saw he was looking at her, she blushed and closed her eyes. He rode by, and she opened the window, saying it was hot, but watching until he left. Then she remembered rhymes her godmother had used. She set the spindle to guide the prince back by its golden thread, the shuttle to weave a path to her hut, and the needle to adorn the hut. When the prince returned, he said she was both the richest and the poorest and married her. The spindle, shuttle, and needle were kept in the royal treasury.
