= Sebastian Brant =

German humanist and satirist (1458–1521)

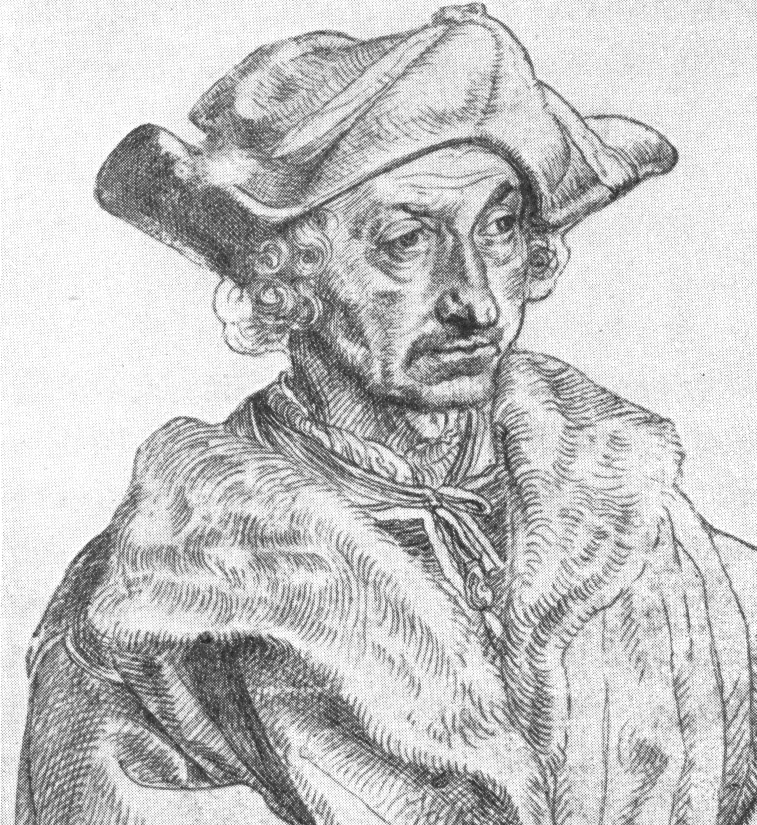
Sebastian Brant by Albrecht Dürer

Sebastian Brant (also Brandt; 1457/1458 – 10 May 1521) was a German humanist and satirist. He is best known for his satire Das Narrenschiff (The Ship of Fools).

== Early life and education ==
Brant was born in either 1457 or 1458 in Strasbourg, Holy Roman Empire, to innkeeper Diebold Brant and Barbara Brant (née Rickler). He entered the University of Basel in October 1475 and as an assistant to Jacobus Hugonius he did not pay the matriculation. For five years he lived in the dorm of magister Hieronymus Berlin, initially studying philosophy and then transferring to the school of law. He was taught Latin by Johann Matthias von Gengenbach, who also lectured philosophy at the Faculty of Philosophy. Initially studying at the Faculty of Philosophy he later studied law. It is assumed he began his law studies in 1476, as his bachelor is already mentioned in the winter of 1477-1478 and in 1484 Brant obtained a licentiate. In 1483 he began teaching at the university and completed his doctorate in law in 1489. He graduated in both canon and civil law.

== Professional career ==
Brant first attracted attention in humanistic circles by his Neo-Latin poetry but, realising that this gave him only a limited audience, he began translating his own work and the Latin poems of others into German, publishing them through the press of his friend Johann Bergmann von Olpe, from which appeared his best known German work, the satirical Das Narrenschiff (Ship of Fools, 1494), the popularity and influence of which were not limited to Germany. In this allegory, the author lashes the weaknesses and vices of his time. It is an episodic work in which a ship laden with and steered by fools goes to the fools' paradise of Narragonia. Here he conceives Saint Grobian, whom he imagines to be the patron saint of vulgar and coarse people. He was employed by the printer Johann Amerbach with whom he collaborated in the publications of the works of christian fathers Augustine and Ambrose. In jurisprudence, he also worked on the Corpus Juridici canonici, which Amerbach was to print jointly with Johannes Froben in 1500. He was very close with several printers of Basel. Between 1488 and 1501 it is known he worked on ninety-five books and it is assumed he worked on several more. Among others, forty-one were published by Johann Bergmann von Olpe, seventeen by Johann Amerbach and twenty-four by Michael Furter. Most of Brant's important writing, including many works on civil and canon law, were written while he was living in Basel. Other sources mention Brant's involvement in about a third of all books published in Basel the late 1500s, but this number is disputed.

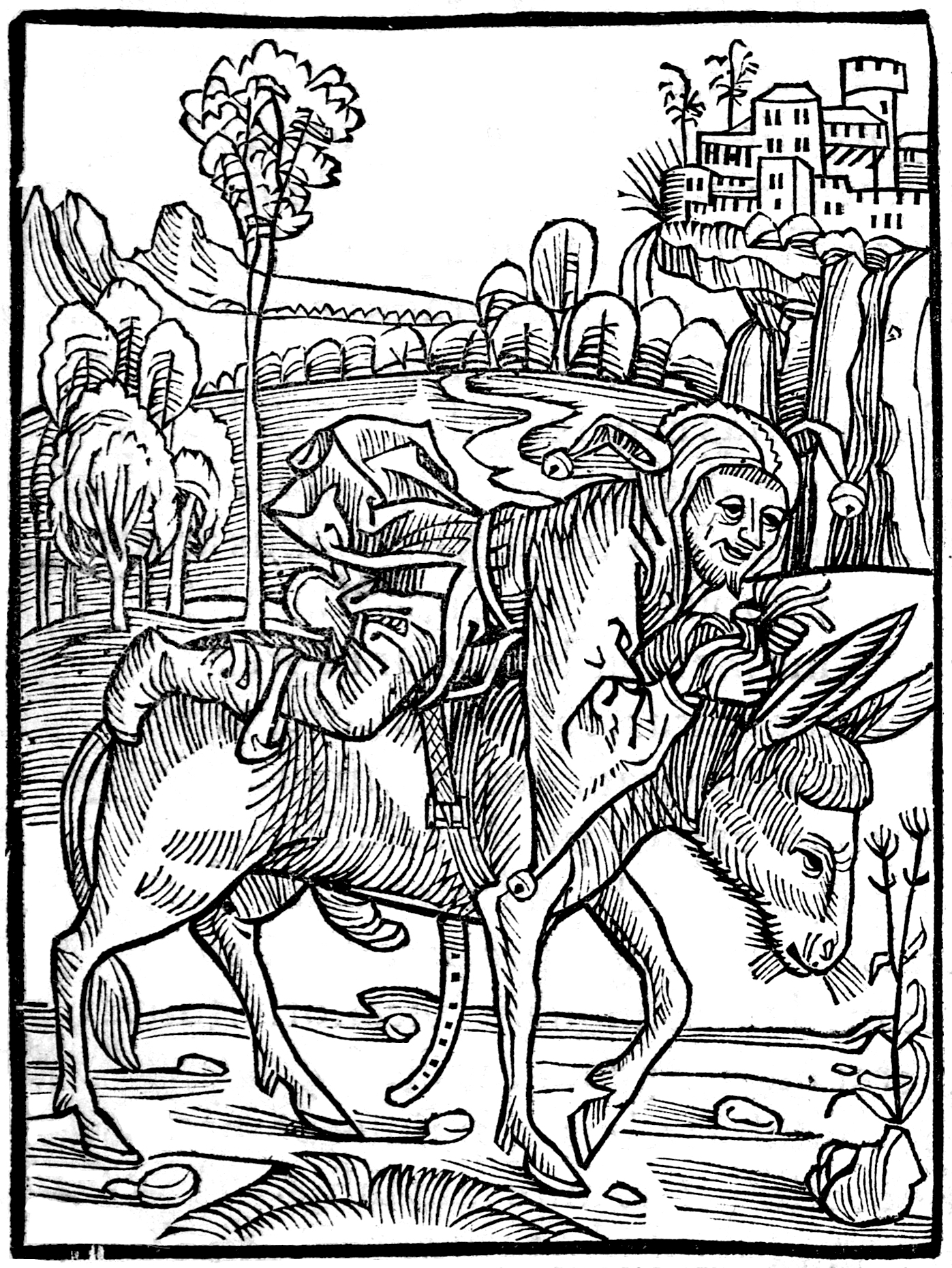
Woodcut from Das Narrenschiff

He returned to Strasbourg, where he was made syndic in August 1500 and remained for the rest of his life. He assumed the office of the syndic in January 1501. In 1502 Maximilian I nominated him an Imperial Councilor. He would also earn the title of a Count Palatine and later be a judge for the Imperial Court in Speyer. In 1503 he secured the influential position of chancellor (stadtschreiber) and his engagement in public affairs prevented him from pursuing a literature career as before. Brant was a Catholic, but he remained tolerant to the Protestants, who were allowed to preach in the market square and publish books during his tenure as a chancellor. In Strasbourg his literary work included a translation into German of the Hortulus Animae in 1501/1502, a Vergil edition in 1503 and he also prepared an edition of Petrarcas "Glücksbuch" for 1520.

Brant made several petitions to the Emperor Maximilian to drive back the Turks in order to save the West. In the same spirit, he had sung the praises of Ferdinand II of Aragon in 1492 for having conquered the Moors and unified Spain. A staunch proponent of German cultural nationalism, he believed that moral reform was necessary for the security of the Empire against the Ottoman threat.

Although essentially conservative in his religious views, Brant's eyes were open to abuses in the church. He published the Narrenschiff in 1494, printed by Michael Furter. Alexander Barclay's Ship of Fools (1509) is a free imitation into early Tudor period English of the German poem, and a Latin version by Jakob Locher (1497) was hardly less popular than the original. Cock Lorell's Bote (printed by Wynkyn de Worde, c. 1510) was a shorter imitation of the Narrenschiff. In this work Cock Lorell, a notorious fraudulent tinker of the period, gathers round him a rascally collection of tradesmen and sets off to sail through England.

Among Brant's many other works was his compilation of fables and other popular stories, published in 1501 under the title Aesopi Appologi sive Mythologi cum quibusdam Carminum et Fabularum additionibus, the beauty of whose production is still appreciated. Though based on Heinrich Steinhöwel's 1476 edition of Aesop, the Latin prose was emended by Brant, who also added verse commentaries with his characteristic combination of wit and style. The second part of the work is entirely new, consisting of riddles, additional fables culled from varied sources, and accounts of miracles and wonders of nature both from his own times and reaching back to antiquity.

The letters by Brant that have survived show that he was in correspondence with Peter Schott, Johann Bergmann von Olpe, Emperor Maximilian, Thomas Murner, Konrad Peutinger, Willibald Pirckheimer, Johannes Reuchlin, Beatus Rhenanus, Jakob Wimpfeling and Ulrich Zasius.

== Personal life ==
In 1485 he had married Elisabeth Bürg, the daughter of a cutler in the town. Brant was the father of seven children. Two of the godfathers to the children were Johann Amerbach and Johann Froben. Keen for his eldest son Onophrius to become a humanist, he taught him Latin in the cradle and enrolled him in the university at the age of seven. Onophrius was to study law with Ulrich Zasius in Freiburg. Later he would be employed in the public service in Strasbourg. His daughter Anna was married to Paul Butz, Sebastian Brant’s successor. He at times signed as Titio, a rarely used Latin term for firebrand, mostly when it rhymed. Johannes Trithemius seemed to be more fond of the name than Brant himself, though.

He died in Strasbourg.

== Editions ==
- Das Narrenschiff, Studienausgabe, ed. by Joachim Knape (Stuttgart: Reclam, 2005)
- Online facsimile of the original
- Edwin H. Zeydel's 1944 translation of The Ship of Fools, of which there is a limited selection on Google Books
- Aesopi Appologi, an unpaged facsimile on Google Books; a page by page online facsimile with short German descriptions from Mannheim University
