= Las armas y las letras =

Concept of Spanish humanism

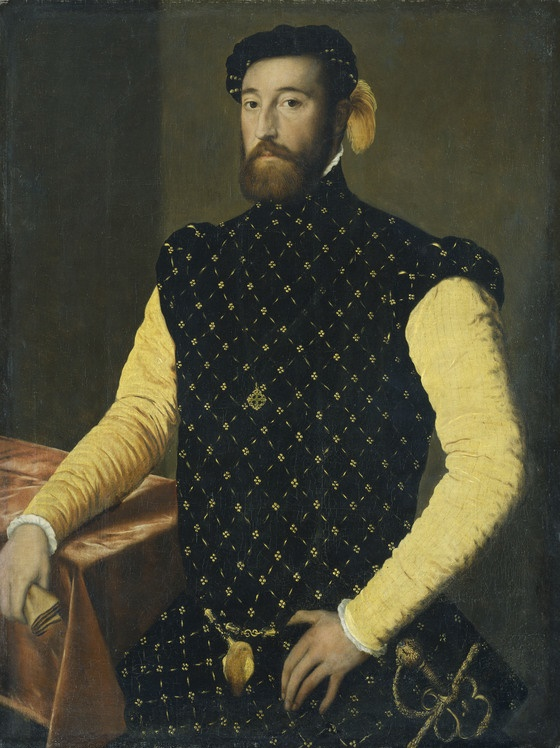
Anonymous tentatively identified with Garcilaso de la Vega, military man and poet.

Las armas y las letras ("the weapons and the letters"), also known by the synecdoche la pluma y la espada ("the pen and the sword"), is a philosophical and literary motif of the Spanish Golden Age, originated in Renaissance humanism and rooted in Classical antiquity. It reflects the union of the military and intellectual life, either balanced or in subordination of one of them to the other.

The motif would define much of the spirit of the imperial Spain, at the time in quick global expansion due to the Age of Discovery, thriving in multiple fields of knowledge and militarily successful in both Europe and America. The optimism of these successes created currents of thought drawing inspiration from the glory and values of Ancient Greece and Rome, among them the idiom fortitudo et sapientia (Latin for "strength and wisdom"), the union of warlike and philosophical life. Spanish culture examined this motif in depth through the role of many soldier-writers like Garcilaso de la Vega, Cervantes, Lope de Vega and Calderón de la Barca.

The concept is considered a "humanism of the weapons" (humanismo de las armas), in which weapons wielded under the guidance of reason become a reflection of spiritual virtue. It influenced heavily the foreign stereotypes about Hispanics, depicting them as obsessed with defending virtue and law by the martial way, heroically but often also quixotically. Arms and letters were reflected in Spanish Renaissance art, by painters like Titian and sculptors like Leone Leoni, who added to the anthropocentrism of the age by vesting the human figure in the distinct attributes of Apollo and Mars from Roman mythology.

== Background ==
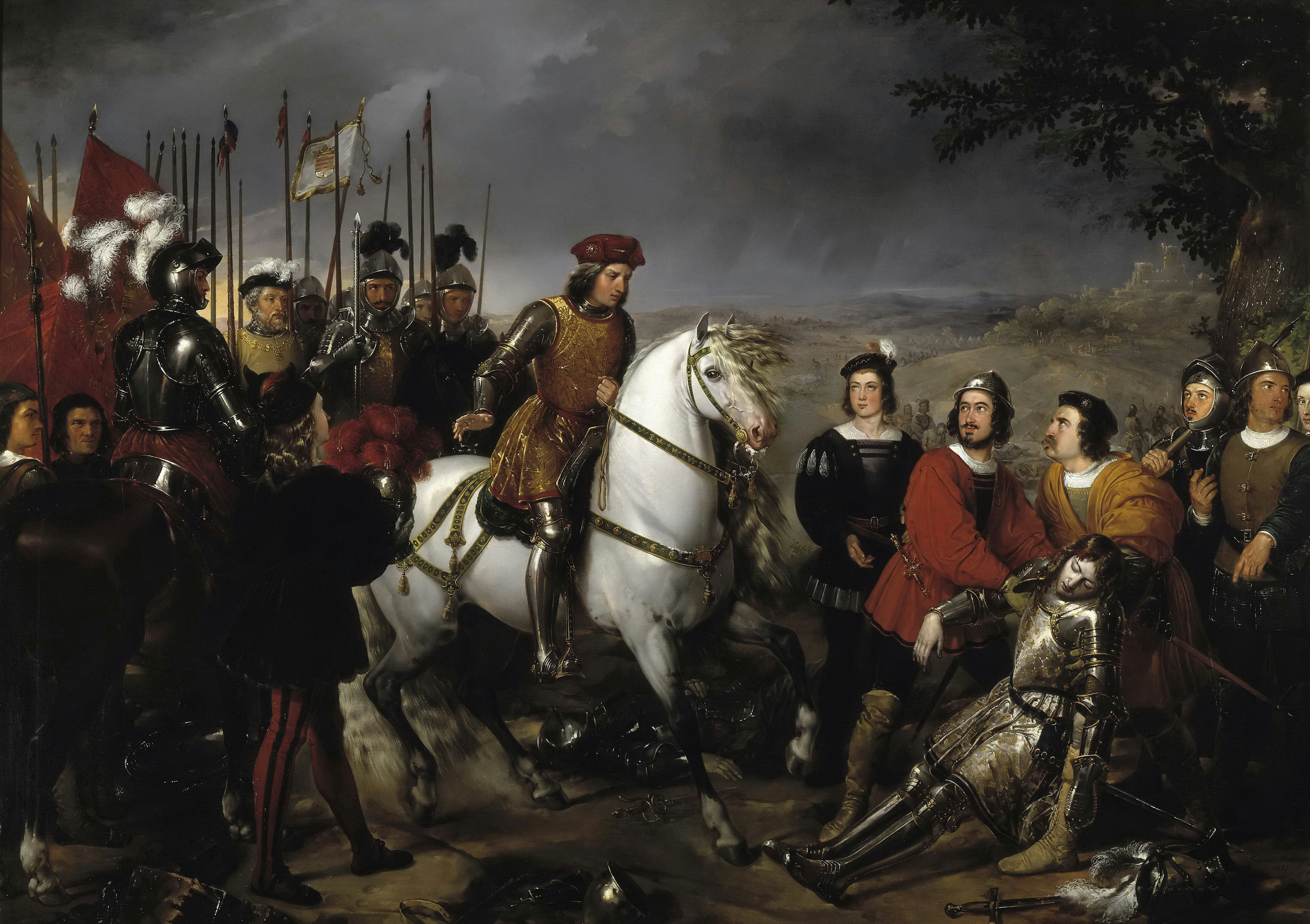
Battle of Cerignola (1503), where firearms were first used extensively against cavalry.

Weapons and letters were, along with religious life, the two main ways to ascend socially in 15-17th century Spain, especially for nobility and hidalgos, who found no equivalent esteem in workmanship, commerce or other jobs. The quick expansion of the Spanish Empire also required a stable source of administrators and men of letters, often common people, which forced their entry in the court by their own merits. It was therefore considered that the weapons and sciences ennobled commoneers and validated noblemen.

War itself changed heavily with the transition from the Middle Ages to the early modern period. Leaving behind many noble or knightly ideals, Renaissance armies broke the aristocratic monopoly and gave passage for many common people, often mercenaries or condottieros fighting for an income, employing techniques based on cold calculation like artillery and firearms, which displaced chivalric elements like personal valor. This coincided with the end of the Reconquista in Spain with the conquest of Granada, reducing the aristocracy's chances to earn glory in battle, yet at the same time allowing them the free time to cultivate intellectual disciplines. Knowledge became another obligatory field of nobility.

As a result, science and studies became a newfound bridge to personal glory in Golden Age Spain, placed at the same level as warrior feats. Through them the man of letters ascended to the level of the hidalgo. However, Spanish culture of honor continued differentiating between them. Men dedicated to intellectual matters were not expected to be challenged to duels of weapons, nor were they expected to accept such challenges, while the opposite was true for men dedicated exclusively to the weapons in the legal context. The motif was also addressed in other nations, with authors like Ludovico Ariosto in Italy, François Rabelais in France and Edmund Spenser in England, but according to historian Ernst Robert Curtius, never with the same vigor and depth as in Spanish Golden Age.

== History ==
=== Late Middle Ages ===
Historian Peter Edward Russell saw medieval precedents in Enrique de Villena and Íñigo López de Mendoza, Marquis of Santillana, who practised it in their own career, becoming famous for their knowledge of science and war alike. Santillana was aware of the motif and addressed it explicitly many times in his works, espousing that studying sciences did not hinder the training in weapons. This was referenced in the poetry of Juan de Mena and Juan de Lucena. Other examples before the Renaissance were also Don Juan Manuel, Pedro López de Ayala, Alfonso de Cartagena and Fernán Pérez de Guzmán, uncle to Santillana. The motif would only strengthen in the light of Renaissance humanism.

In a letter to the Marquis of Santillana, Alonso de Cartganea described milicia (the profession of arms) as both a physical and a spiritual quest, reclaiming the term of mílite (translated by him as soldier, militiaman or defender of the realm) for scholars and priests, which he also called caballeros de la caballería desarmada ("knights of the unarmed chivalry"). In 1444, in his Doctrinal de Caballeros, he attempted to refute the still usual belief that arms and letters were incompatible.

=== Reign of Charles V ===
Baldassare Castiglione.

The motif was opposed by Erasmus in his 1503 Enchiridion militis Christiani, where he reduced weapons to metaphors and declared the best weapons are prayer and knowledge of divinity. Going further, in 1511 he wrote in In Praise of Folly an even more direct pacifist manifesto, although he went to justify the Italian Wars by the sake of France. In Institutio Principis Christiani in 1516, he condemned the desire of many to resemble classical heroes like Achilles, Xerxes I, Cyrus, Darius and Julius Caesar, whom he considered depraved. However, most Spanish humanists, with the exception of Juan Luis Vives, separated from him and sided with the more warlike Italian humanists.

The seminal work of the weapons and the letters is The Courtier by Baldassare Castiglione, a Mantuan humanist who befriended Charles I of Spain and V of the Holy Roman Empire. The treatise, published in 1528 and translated to Spanish by Juan Boscán en 1533, became a compulsory read for the Renaissance gentlemen, calling to combine the soldier with the scholar, the poet and the lover, stating: "how deceived the French are by believing that the letters hinder the arms". Castiglione established a continuation of the ancient tradition of the sapientia et fortitudo. In his work, weapons and words exist in symbiosis: military feats are born from the desire of glory, becoming immortal thanks to the letters, which in turn inspire the readers to new military feats.

Contrary to Castiglione, in 1533 Vives warns in De ratione dicendi that love for war brought the fall of many nations, stating that the letters must reccount war "without decorations, with disdain, so that a long war could be only an example of passion, ambition, rage and hate". He therefore believes that the letters should seek to undermine the weapons. This is opposed again by Juan Ginés de Sepúlveda in his Democrates in 1535, where he celebrates that many young aristocrats of his day dedicate themselves to science and culture, but reminds them not to lose their identity as men at arms. He offered arguments inspirated by the Bible, Antiquity and natural law.

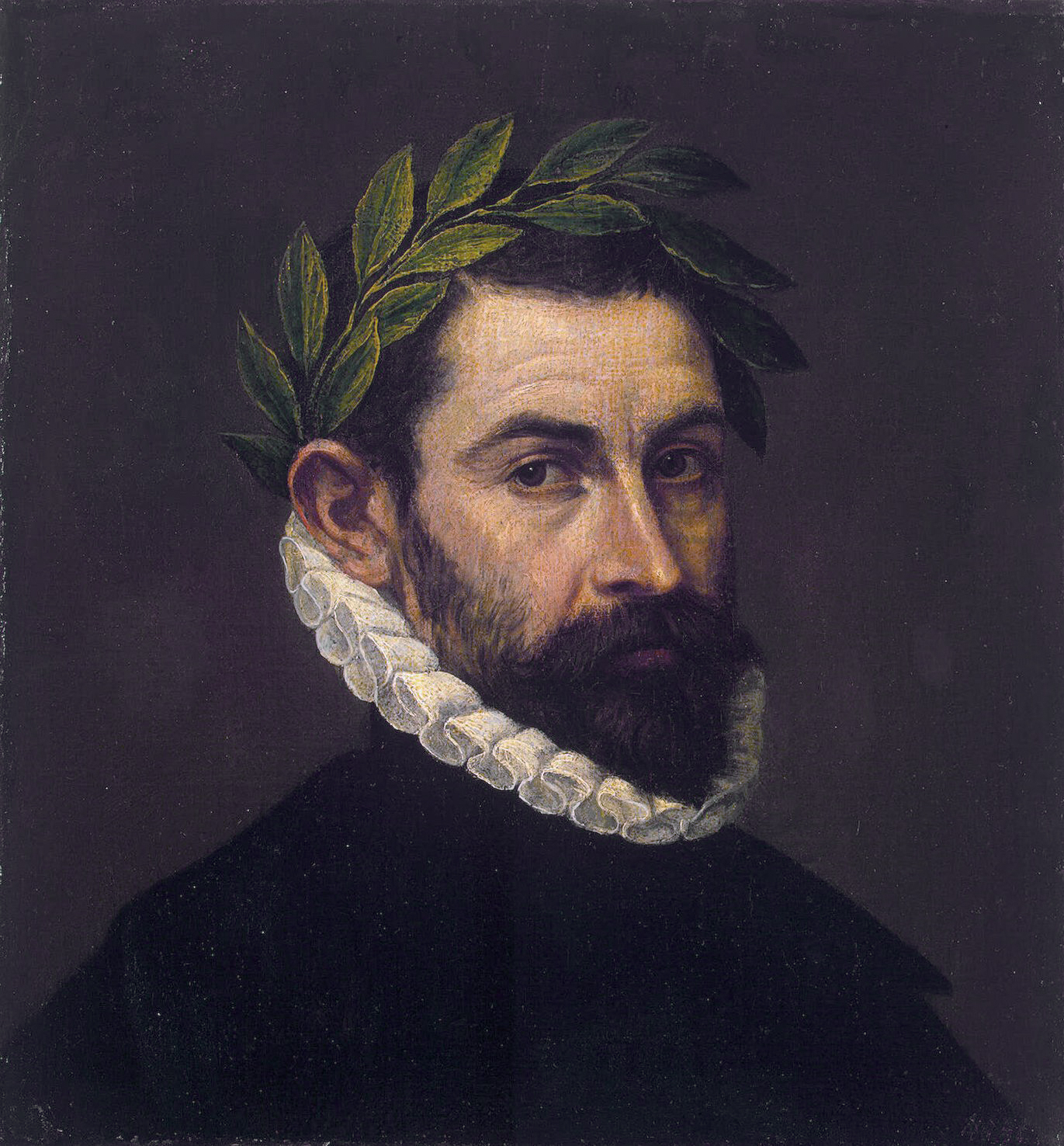
Alonso de Ercilla.

Sepúlveda also wrote to Charles V encouraging him not to despair to the might of the Ottoman Empire, and collects feats of Antiquity where few warriors defeated many enemies, such as the Trojan War and the Battle of Thermopylae.

Garcilaso de la Vega, a soldier and a poet killed in action in 1536, wrote one of the most iconic verses about the conjunction of the sword and the pen:

Entre las armas del sangriento Marte,
do apenas hay quien su furor contraste,
hurté de tiempo aquesta breve suma,
tomando ora la espada, ora la pluma.

The Castilian language, which experienced an uprise since Charles V made it the language of his chancelleries, featured many examples of soldier-scholars which employed it to search for the humanistic elevation of the soul, spicing it with Greek and Roman concepts, especially from the second half of the 16th century. The Spanish Petrarchian group, represented by writers like Francisco de Aldana and Alonso de Ercilla, became especially eminent. In the same Hellenist line, Pedro Mexía wrote his Silva de varia lección in 1540 to bring back the Platonic idea of the philosopher king, which he saw represented by examples of cultured conquerors like Caesar and Alexander the Great. He established that intellectuality is essential for a king, as it allows him to achieve victory in wartime and rule well in peacetime.

=== Reign of Philip II ===
Philip II, successor to Charles V in the throne of Spain, became an exponent of the weapons and the letter by influence of his father, who arranged for Philip to learn in both fields under Juan Martínez Silíceo and the captain of the royal guard Juan de Zúñiga. As a prince, Philip traveled throughout Europe and gained experience with the weapons, hunting and jousting with the nobility of the Habsburg Netherlands, and as a king, he organized the biggest private library of Europe in his palace of El Escorial, assisted by humanists like Diego Hurtado de Mendoza and Pedro Ponce de León. Aside from books, he collected weapons, and passed his love for hunting to his two daughters Isabella Clara Eugenia and Catalina Micaela, to their contemporaries' shock. His readings included from chivalric romances to the works of Erasmus, as well as The Prince by Machiavelli and Relox de príncipes by Antonio de Guevara.

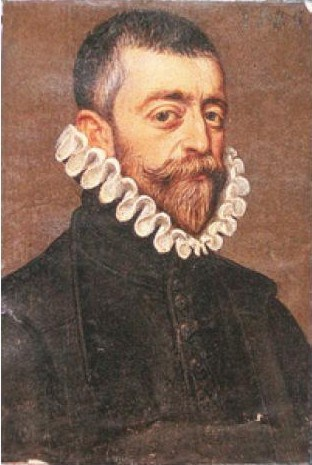
Cristóbal Mosquera de Figueroa.

Philip's policies were dominated by the motif. He became king in an age where monarchs could not freely venture in the battlefield, as firearms made survival unpredictable. Philip himself found personally no glory in war and preferred to indulge in study and books. However, he did not doubt to order his armies to take arms in defense of the universitas christiana once pursued by his father. His ideology has been called a humanism of the weapons, in which there was no contradiction between loving humanity and going to war as long as it was under the principles of virtue and for a just cause.

The resounding Christian victory in the Battle of Lepanto in 1571, in which the Ottoman fleet was annihilated, was a turning point in the motif of arms and letters. The commander of the Christian fleet, John of Austria, was compared to Roman god Mars and celebrated in the literary work of Cristóbal Mosquera de Figueroa, himself a veteran of Lepanto, and Fernando de Herrera, one of whose poems was engraved in one of the Spanish galleys in the battle. The same era is covered by poet Baltasar del Alcázar. Figueroa synthetizes the motif in his Breve Compendio de Disciplina Militar in 1596, where he states how Spanish soldiers who wrote by night about what they did by day.

Chronicler Francisco Cervantes de Salazar also commented about the symbiotic relationship between the pen and the sword, in which arms provide letters with feats but it is up to the letters to immortalize them. He gave this was the reason why, despite having taken place in ancient times, the feats of Caesar and Alexandre were still known and valid.

Towads the end of the century, the superior among arms and letters is still debated. In Diálogos familiares (1580), Juan de Pineda came to the conclusion that the sword was mightier than the pen, as Achilles' deeds carry a bigger merit than Homer's work to spread word about them. However, Pineda also figures Athena defeating Mars, implying that the pen is mightier than the sword. Nevertheless, whenever the opposition of the pen and the sword is discussed, these appear as adversaries of the same dignity and not to their mutual expense.

=== Late Spanish Golden Age ===
In 1599, Juan de Mariana wrote Del rey y de la institución de la dignidad real, heavily influenced by Solon. He stated that intellectual leanings were essential for the prince in part because they were useful militarily, providing him with rhetoric to inflame armies and science to create instruments of war.

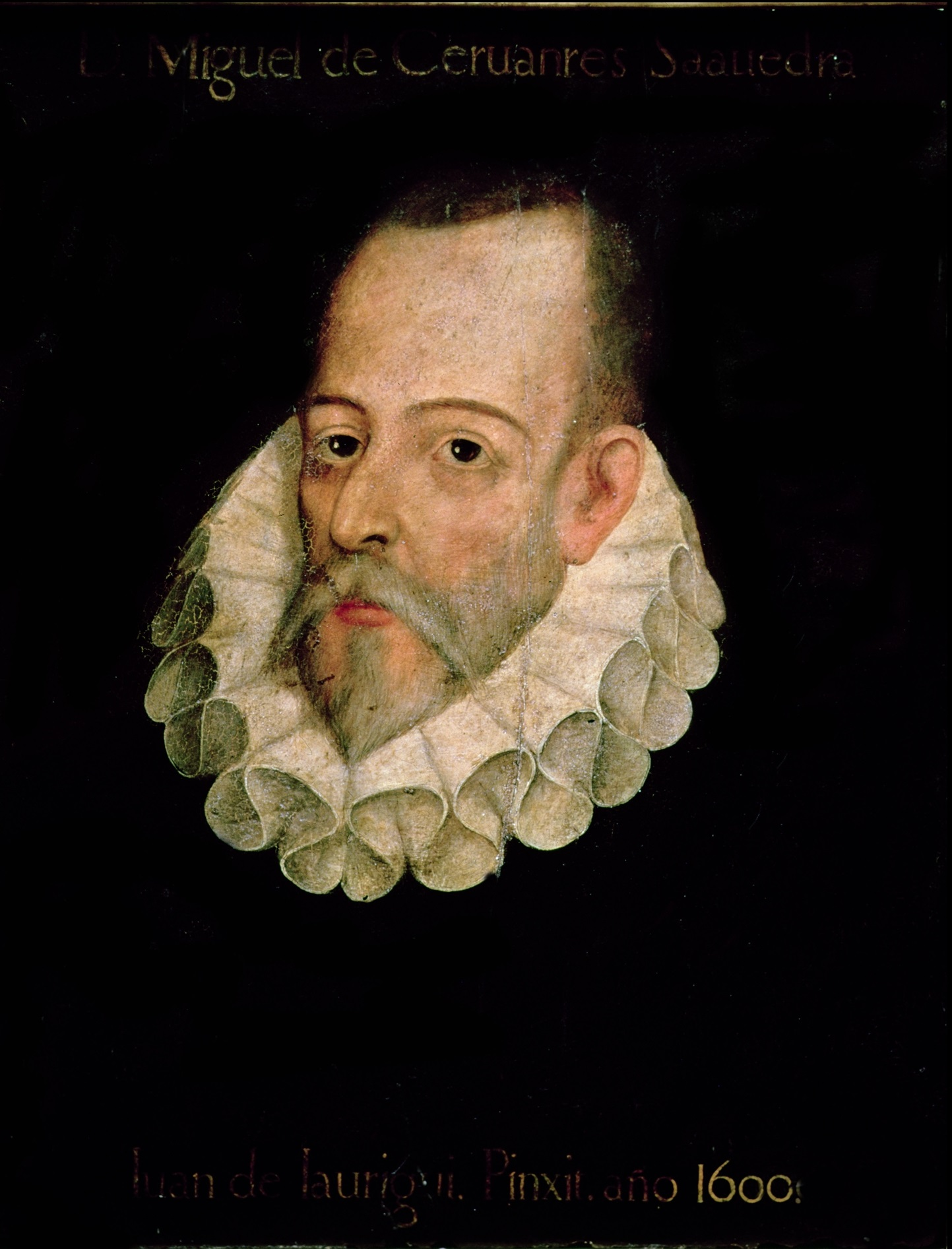
Portrait of Miguel de Cervantes.

Miguel de Cervantes, another veteran of Lepanto, places the duality of the arms and the letters in the heart of their works, especially his masterpiece Don Quixote, published its first part in 1605. Cervantes is influenced by several of the humanists who addressed this motif, among them Castiglione, Erasmus, Mexía and Juan de Mal Lara. Paradoxically for Cervantes, who lost his arm from a wound the battle and only thrived thanks to his literary works, Don Quixote sides vibrantly with the weapons and has its main character praising them over the letters, even although Don Quixote's whole character conflates both passions. This decision might come from the desire of the military humanists to distinguish themselves from mere civile servants, a goal already present in Petrarch.

During the novel, Don Quixote affirms that the way of the weapons is a spiritual pursuit at the level of the letters and whose ultimate goal is the achievement of peace. In doing so, he follows Erasmus by underlining the sacred value of peace, but separates from him by stating that it is not possible to preserve peace without fighting. Consequently with this idea Don Quixote sees no merit in feats and glory, instead emphasizing the soldier's usual poverty and suffering in the course of his duty, that of fighting for peace.

"Letters say that arms cannot exist without them, because war also has its own laws that must be obeyed, and laws are the profession of the man of letters. Arms respond to this saying that letters cannot sustain themselves without arms, because with arms, republics are defended, kingdoms are preserved, cities are protected, highways are made safe, and the seas cleared of corsairs. Finally, if there were no arms, you can bet that republics, kingdoms, monarchies, cities, and highways of the sea and land would all be subject to the ruin and disorder of war."

— Don Quixote, chapter XXXVIII

Don Quixote makes an exception with firearms, which he considers an evil invention for their power to easily kill a knight from afar. This opinion is shared again by several writers of the Renaissance, when firearms and artillery were making an impression. It is debated whether Cervantes himself shared this idea or only gave it to the archaic-minded Don Quixote for the sake of narrative coherence, as Cervantes served precisely as an arquebusier in his military career, which included pointedly Lepanto, a victory achieved through superiority in firearms. The work also shows an impeccable knowledge of the last advances in firearms of his time.

Cervantes develops also the union of arms and letters in another of his works, his posthumours novel Los trabajos de Persiles y Sigismunda, where he claims the best soldiers are these coming from intellectual backgrounds.

In 1634, Francisco Cascales profiled scholarship as a worthy pursuit for nobility, just like weapons. In the same age, Baltasar Gracián considered the city of Madrid, made imperial capital in 1561, an "august stage of the arms and the letters". Although without taking arms personally, instead serving as a military chaplain, Gracián participated actively in the 1640 Reapers' War, which also saw the participation of Portuguese soldier and writer Francisco Manuel de Melo.

== See also ==
- The pen is mightier than the sword
- Mens sana in corpore sano
- Might makes right

== Bibliography ==
- Arellano, Ignacio (2009). Autoridad y poder en el Siglo de Oro. Universidad de Navarra. ISBN 9788484894704.
- García Gibert, Javier (2010). La humanitas Hispana. Sobre el humanismo literario en los siglos de oro. Universidad de Salamanca. ISBN 9788478002023.
- Maravall, José Antonio (1948). El humanismo de las armas en Don Quijote. Instituto de Estudios Políticos.
- Romojaro, Rosa (1998). Funciones del mito clásico en el siglo de oro: Garcilaso, Góngora, Lope de Vega, Quevedo. Anthropos. ISBN 9788476585450.
- Strosetzki, Christoph (1996). La literatura como profesión: en torno a la autoconcepción de la existencia erudita literaria en el Siglo de Oro español. Reichenberg. ISBN 9783930700929.
