= Francisco de Aldana =

Spanish poet

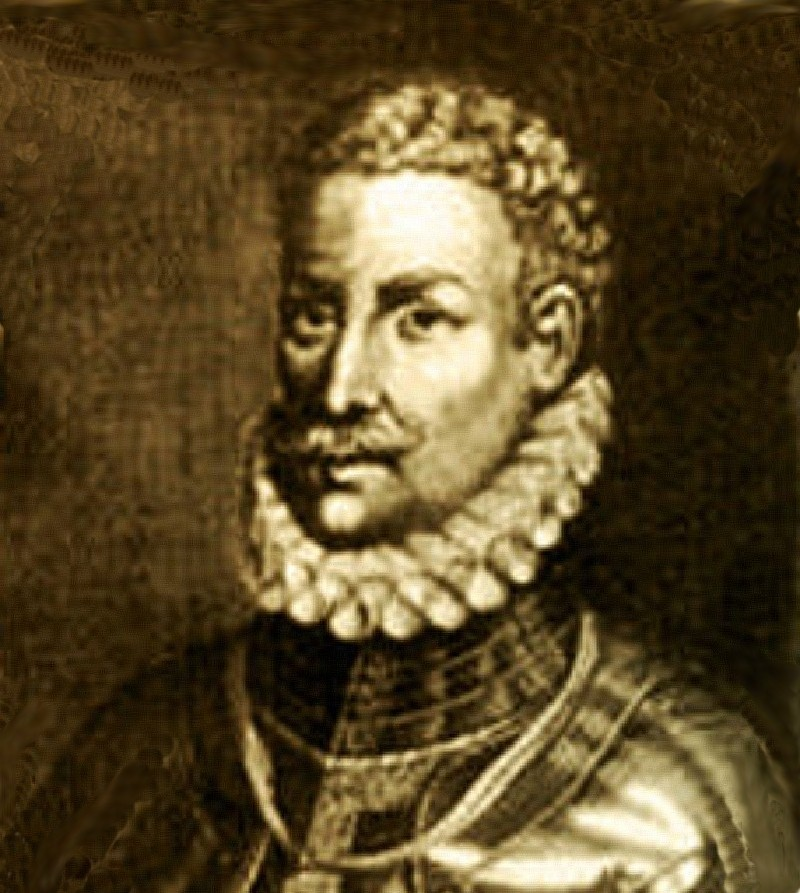
- Born: 1537; Kingdom of Naples
- Died: August 4, 1578 (aged 40–41); Ksar el-Kebir, Morocco
- Occupations: Poet, writer, military man and diplomat
- Relatives: Cosme de Aldana (brother); Bernardo de Aldana (uncle)
- Writing career
- Genre: Poetry

Francisco de Aldana (Kingdom of Naples, 1537 - Ksar el-Kebir, (Morocco), August 4, 1578) was a military man and one of the most important poets in the Spanish language of the 16th century, in the second phase of the Spanish Renaissance.

== Studies about his origins ==
There is no certain evidence of the exact place of his birth. Due to the existence of different families with the same surname, his affiliation has been debated for centuries: Gil Polo, in the final stanzas of the "Canto del Turia ”(1564), mentions an Aldana among the Valencian poets of his time, personality that Gregorio Mayans (later followed by Vicente Ximeno) identifies with the poet, and assumes he was of Valencian origin. Félix Torres Amat shares this identification, but states that he was born in Tortosa, of the Aldana family from Tortosa. Menéndez Pelayo contradicts them saying that he was probably from Valencia de Alcántara, and still Rodríguez-Moñino would make him born in Alcántara. Finally, Elias L. Rivers, based on documents then unpublished, determined that he was most likely born in the kingdom of Naples, and son of the military man Antonio de Aldana, and therefore originally from Extremadura, thesis recently confirmed by Nievas Rojas.

== Life and works ==
He spent his youth in Florence, devoted to the study of classical languages and the authors of antiquity, of whom he became a good connoisseur. He drew upon Italian influences, including Vittoria Colonna. He is one of the representatives of Neoplatonism in Spanish poetry, as explored by the Scottish Hispanist Paul Joseph Lennon. As a poet, he was so praised in his days that he was called the Divine .

His brother Cosme published in two parts ( Milan, 1589; Madrid, 1591) what he could find of his work, in which the sonnets stand out in particular where he reveals his disappointment and disgust about the military life he led and expresses his desire to retire to a contemplative life in solitude and in contact with the nature. Also important are a Fable of Phaeton in hendecasyllables, the very original Song of Christ crucified and the extraordinary Epistle to Arias Montano on the contemplation of God and the requirements of it (1577), in chained tercets, of Neoplatonic inspiration, which has happened in all anthologies of poetry in Spanish as a classic work by content and style:

Pienso torcer de la común carrera
que sigue el vulgo y caminar derecho
jornada de mi patria verdadera;

entrarme en el secreto de mi pecho
y platicar en él mi interior hombre,
dó va, dó está, si vive, o qué se ha hecho.

Y porque vano error más no me asombre,
en algún alto y solitario nido
pienso enterrar mi ser, mi vida y nombre

y, como si no hubiera acá nacido,
estarme allá, cual Eco, replicando
al dulce son de Dios, del alma oído.

Admired by Francisco de Quevedo, who tried to publish his works in the 16th century to combat the culteranism, Cervantes mentions him at the side of Boscán and Garcilaso, and in the 20th century was adored by the poets of Generation of 1927 like Luis Cernuda .

== Military career ==
He devoted himself to the military career, which did not take long to detest, longing for the contemplative life. He fought as a captain in the Battle of St. Quentin and, as a general of artillery, in the Tercios of Flanders in the service of Fernando Álvarez de Toledo y Pimentel, the Duke of Alba, During the Siege of Haarlem he was wounded in one foot by an arquebus shot.

He resided at the court of the Medici in Florence, where he completed his training. Sent by Philip II of Castile to the service of Sebastian I of Portugal, he died along with Sebastian fighting the Saracens at the Battle of Kasr al-Kabir, after having strongly advised the king against that expedition.

== Works ==
=== Sonnets ===
- Al cielo
- Alma Venus gentil, que al tierno arquero
- ¿Cuál es la causa, mi Damón, que estando
- Cuál nunca osó mortal tan alto el vuelo
- El ímpetu cruel de mi destino
- Es tanto el bien que derramó en mi seno
- Galanio, tú sabrás que esotro día
- Hase movido, dama, una pasión
- Mil veces callo que romper deseo
- Mil veces digo, entre los brazos puesto
- Otro aquí no se ve que, frente a frente
- Por un bofetón dado a una dama
- Reconocimiento de la vanidad del mundo

=== Other poems ===
- Carta para Arias Montano (also known as the Epístola a Arias Montano)
- Pocos tercetos escritos a un amigo

== Bibliography ==
- A la soledad de nuestra Señora la Madre de Dios. Ms. Madrid, Biblioteca Nacional, 2058, fol. 138r-141v.
- Canción a la Soledad de la Madre de Dios y Soneto al Sepulcro de Nuestro Señor. Edic. de B. J. Gallardo. En: Ensayo de una biblioteca española de libros raros y curiosos. Madrid: s.n., 1863, Vol. I, cols. 129–131.
- Epistolario poético completo. Noticia preliminar por A. Rodríguez Moñino. Edic. de 500 ejemplares numerados. Badajoz: Diputación Provincial. Instituto de Servicios Culturales (Madrid, Graf. Ugina), 1946, 126 p.
- Hombre adentro, Epístola de ... El Divino y Epístola moral a Fabio. Edic. de J. M: de Cossío. México: Séneca, 1941, 58 p.
- Obras completas. Edic. de Manuel Moragón Maestre. Madrid: C.S.I.C., 1953, 2 v.
- Octava de muerte del Serenísimo Príncipe don Carlos, del único Aldana. En: Rey de Artieda, A. Discursos, epístolas y epigramas de Artemidoro. Zaragoza: s.n., 1605, fols. 29v-30r.
- Poesías. Ms. Madrid, Biblioteca Nacional, n. 17719.
- Poesías. Ms. Madrid, Biblioteca Nacional, n. 18140.
- Poesías. Prólogo, edición y notas de E. L. Rivers. Madrid: Espasa-Calpe, 1957, 151 p.
- Primera parte de las obras que hasta agora se han podido hallar del capitán... Agora nuevamente puestas en luz por su hermano Cosme de Aldana. Milán: Pablo Gotardo Panda, 1589.
- Primera parte de las obras. S.l.: s.n., s.a., 158 fols.
- Retrato a Gabriel Lasso de la Vega. En: Lasso de la Vega, Gabriel. Cortés valeroso... Madrid: s.n., 1588, Preliminares.
- Segunda parte de las obras que se han podido hallar del capitán... Sacadas a luz nuevamente por Cosme Aldana. S.l.: s.n., s.a, 160 hs.
- Segunda parte de las obras, que se han podido hallar. Madrid: Pedro Madrigal, 1591, 111 fols.
- Soneto al sepulcro de Nuestro Señor. Ms. Madrid, Biblioteca Nacional, 2058, fol. 141v-142r.
- Soneto. Florencia: Torrentino, 1563.
- Todas las obras que hasta agora se han podido hallar... Agora nuevamente puestas en luz por Cosme de Aldana su hermano... Madrid: Luys Sánchez, 1593, 109 fols.
