= 1547 in literature =

This article contains information about the literary events and publications of 1547.

== Events ==
- July 20 – On the death of the Alsatian scholar Beatus Rhenanus, his personal collection of around 670 books is bequeathed to the Humanist Library of Sélestat, where it remains intact in the 21st century.
- unknown date – Japanese Buddhist poet and diplomat Sakugen Shūryō leads a mission sent by the Ashikaga shogunate to the court of the Jiajing Emperor in Beijing.

== New books ==
=== Prose ===
- Certain Sermons or Homilies Appointed to Be Read in Churches, book 1
- Andrés de Olmos – Arte para aprender la lengua mexicana
- Martynas Mažvydas – The Simple Words of Catechism (first printed book in Lithuanian)
- Catherine Parr – The Lamentation of a Sinner
- William Salesbury – A Dictionary in Englyshe and Welshe
- "Lucas Shepeherd" – John Bon and Mast Parson
- Gian Giorgio Trissino – Italia liberata dai Goti

=== Drama ===
- Lodovico Dolce – Didone

=== Poetry ===
- See 1547 in poetry

== Births ==
- September – Mateo Alemán, Spanish novelist, poet and biographer (died c. 1615)
- September 22 – Philipp Nicodemus Frischlin, German philologist, poet, playwright and polymath (died 1590)
- September 29 – Miguel de Cervantes, Spanish novelist, poet, and playwright (died 1616)
- Unknown dates
  - Cristóbal Mosquera de Figueroa, Spanish poet (died 1610)
  - Conrad Vetter, German Jesuit preacher and polemical writer (died 1622)
- Probable year – Maciej Stryjkowski, Polish historian and poet (died c. 1593)

== Deaths ==
- January – Pietro Bembo, Italian scholar and poet (born 1470)
- January 19 – Henry Howard, Earl of Surrey, a founder of English Renaissance poetry (born 1516 or 1517)
- February 25 – Vittoria Colonna, Italian noblewoman and poet (born 1492)
- March 16 – François Vatable, French humanist scholar (born late 15th century)
- October or November – John Redford, English composer, poet and playwright (born c. 1500)
- Unknown dates
  - Edward Hall, English historian, politician and lawyer (born 1497)
  - Valentin Ickelshamer, German grammarian (born c. 1500)
  - Johannes Mensing, German Dominican theologian (born 1477)
