= Mens sana in corpore sano =

Latin phrase regarding health

Mens sana in corpore sano (Classical Latin: [mẽːs ˈsaːna ɪŋ ˈkɔrpɔrɛ ˈsaːnoː]) is a Latin phrase, usually translated as 'a healthy mind in a healthy body'. The phrase is widely used in sporting and educational contexts to express that physical exercise is an important or essential part of mental and psychological well-being.

== History ==
The phrase comes from Satire X (c. 2nd century AD) of the Roman poet Juvenal (10.356). It is the first in a list of what is desirable in life:

orandum est ut sit mens sana in corpore sano.
fortem posce animum mortis terrore carentem,
qui spatium vitae extremum inter munera ponat
naturae, qui ferre queat quoscumque labores,
nesciat irasci, cupiat nihil et potiores
Herculis aerumnas credat saevosque labores
et venere et cenis et pluma Sardanapalli.
monstro quod ipse tibi possis dare; semita certe
tranquillae per virtutem patet unica vitae.

— Roman poet Juvenal (10.356-64)
Translation:

You should pray for a healthy mind in a healthy body.
Ask for a stout heart that has no fear of death,
and deems length of days the least of Nature's gifts
that can endure any kind of toil,
that knows neither wrath nor desire and thinks
the woes and hard labors of Hercules better than
the loves and banquets and downy cushions of Sardanapalus.
What I commend to you, you can give to yourself;
For assuredly, the only road to a life of peace is virtue.

Traditional commentators believe that Juvenal's intention was to teach his fellow Roman citizens that in the main, their prayers for such things as long life are misguided and that the gods had provided man with virtues which he then lists for them.

Over time and separated from its context, the phrase has come to have a range of meanings. It can be construed to mean that only a healthy mind can lead to a healthy body, or equally that only a healthy body can produce or sustain a healthy mind. Its most general usage is to express the hierarchy of needs, with physical and mental health at the root.

An earlier, similar saying is attributed to the 6th century BC Greek pre-Socratic philosopher Thales of Miletus:

τίς εὐδαίμων, "ὁ τὸ μὲν σῶμα ὑγιής, τὴν δὲ ψυχὴν εὔπορος, τὴν δὲ φύσιν εὐπαίδευτος"

Translation:

What man is happy? "He who has a healthy body, a resourceful mind and a docile nature."

== Usages ==
- Later usages:
  - John Locke (1632–1704) uses the phrase in his book Some Thoughts Concerning Education, 1693.
  - Heinrich von Treitschke used this phrase in his work titled The Army. He uses the phrase to highlight a sound principle of his German nationalistic doctrine. His work echoes the principles of late nineteenth century Prussian society.
  - Its first use in an athletic context appears to have been by John Hulley in December 1861. In 1862, he chose it as the motto of the Liverpool Athletic Club and Liverpool Olympic Games.
  - Dr. K. Keyer, leader of the Public Health Council of the Netherlands during the Second World War, used the phrase as a goal for public health care.
  - Slavic Sokol movement (f. 1862)
  - The schoolteacher Kulygin quotes the phrase in Act I of Three Sisters by Anton Chekhov.
  - Used as the motto of patent medicine manufacturer Samuel Solomon
- Usage as the motto of athletic clubs:
  - Örgryte IS
  - Liverpool Athletic Club
  - Paraná Clube
  - Gimnasia y Esgrima de Buenos Aires
  - Club Gimnasia y Esgrima de Mendoza
  - Club de Gimnasia y Esgrima La Plata
  - Georgetown Hoyas
  - R.S.C. Anderlecht
  - C.D. Santa Clara
  - Associação de Educação Física e Desportiva
  - The Turners Organization American Turners and their local organizations like the Los Angeles turners.
  - Carlton Football Club
  - Asociacion Atletica Argentinos Juniors
  - The Israeli Institute of Technology athletics teams
  - Mens Sana Basket
  - Beale Gaelic Football Club from County Kerry
  - Torrens Rowing Club
  - Sydney Rowing Club
  - London Academicals Hockey Club
- Usage as the motto of military institutions:
  - Royal Marines physical training instructors (PTI).
  - Riverside Military Academy in Gainesville, Georgia
  - Hargrave Military Academy in Chatham, Virginia
  - Army Physical Training Corps (APTC)
  - PERI (Physical Education & Recreation Instructors), which is part of the Canadian Military
  - New Zealand Defence Force Physical Training Instructors.
- Usage as the motto of educational institutions:
  - East Brisbane State School, Queensland, Australia
  - Windham High School (Ohio)
  - Hiranandani Foundation School, Mumbai, India
  - Teacher's College of Columbia University has this phrase engraved on its Horace Mann hall, on 120th Street in New York City
  - The University College London Men's Rugby Football Club, Based out of the Bloomsbury in London
  - Grant Medical College and Sir J.J. Hospital, Mumbai
  - Widener University and the State University of New York at Buffalo
  - The phrase appears in stone on the western facade of the School of Public Health at Indiana University in Bloomington, Indiana
  - The phrase appears in stone above the entranceway to the Athletic Center at Mount Allison University in Sackville, New Brunswick
  - Albert Schweitzer Pastoral Medicine Institute
  - Dhaka Physical Education College in Dhaka, Bangladesh
  - Sparta High School in Sparta, New Jersey
  - Charleston Female Seminary
  - Detroit Country Day School in Beverly Hills, Michigan
  - Erskine Academy in South China, Maine
  - Roger Bacon High School, St. Bernard, Ohio
  - Bjelke-Petersen School of Physical Culture, Australia
  - Bridgewater Junior Senior High School in Bridgewater, Nova Scotia
  - Kongsbakken videregående skole in Tromsø, Norway
  - Lakefield College School in Lakefield, Canada
  - Polish Association of Sport named SOKÓŁ before World War I. Poland, Galicja in that time Austria
  - The Internado Nacional Barros Arana in Santiago, Chile.
  - Used as a line in the school song of Bangor Grammar School, in Bangor, County Down, Northern Ireland.
  - Used as motto for Lundsbergs skola, an elite school in Sweden.
  - Used as motto for The Park School of Baltimore Athletics, a K-12 school in Baltimore, Maryland.
  - Used as motto for Foxcroft School, an all-girls' boarding school in Middleburg, Virginia.
  - Westholme School, an independent school set on the edge of the countryside of Blackburn, England
  - Loyola High School in Montreal, Quebec, Canada
  - Winsor School in Boston, Massachusetts uses the English translation as their motto.
  - St Andrew's College in Gampola, Sri Lanka
- Usage in other cases:
  - The phrase was a favorite of Harry S. Truman, the 33rd President of the United States.
  - It was heavily weaponised by Benito Mussollini as part of a Model of masculinity under fascist Italy and with an eugenics undertone
  - The sneaker and sports equipment manufacturer Asics takes its name from an acronym of a variant: "anima sana in corpore sano" 'a healthy soul in a healthy body'.
  - Mensa, a high-IQ society, derives its name both from the Latin word for table, "mensa" and a pun on the phrase "mens sana".
  - Sound Body Sound Mind, a United States nonprofit organization (501(c)(3) that promotes self-confidence and healthy lifestyle choices among children.
  - A variant, in Danish En sund sjæl i et sundt legeme was the motto of Captain J.P. Jespersen, a Danish gymnastics educator/instructor.
  - Nikola Tesla, in his work titled "The Problem of Increasing Human Energy" supports the idea, recommending moderate exercise and avoiding overemphasis on physical fitness.
  - "In corpore sano" is a song by the Serbian singer-songwriter Konstrakta which she represented Serbia in the Eurovision Song Contest 2022 with, finishing 5th.
  - Victoria Wood uses it in comedic parody Mens Sana In Thingummy Doodah
  - The fictional Blackwood Pines Sanatorium in Until Dawn has the phrase as its motto

== See also ==
- Mind-body dualism
- Las armas y las letras
