= The pen is mightier than the sword =

Adage in the English language

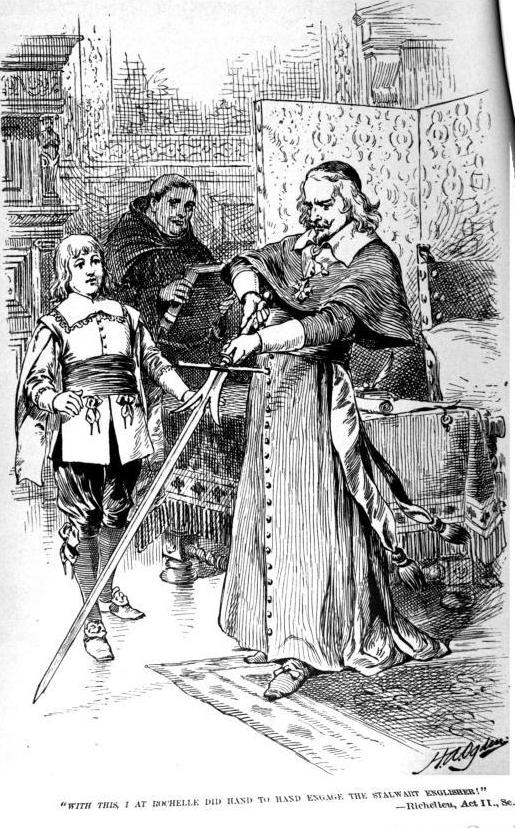
An illustration of Cardinal Richelieu holding a sword, by H. A. Ogden, 1892, from The Works of Edward Bulwer Lytton

"The pen is mightier than the sword" is an expression indicating that the written word is more effective than violence as a means of social or political change. This sentiment has been expressed with metaphorical contrasts of writing implements and weapons for thousands of years. The specific wording that "the pen is mightier than the sword" was first used by English author Edward Bulwer-Lytton in 1839.

Under some interpretations, written communication can refer to administrative power or an independent news media.

== Origin ==
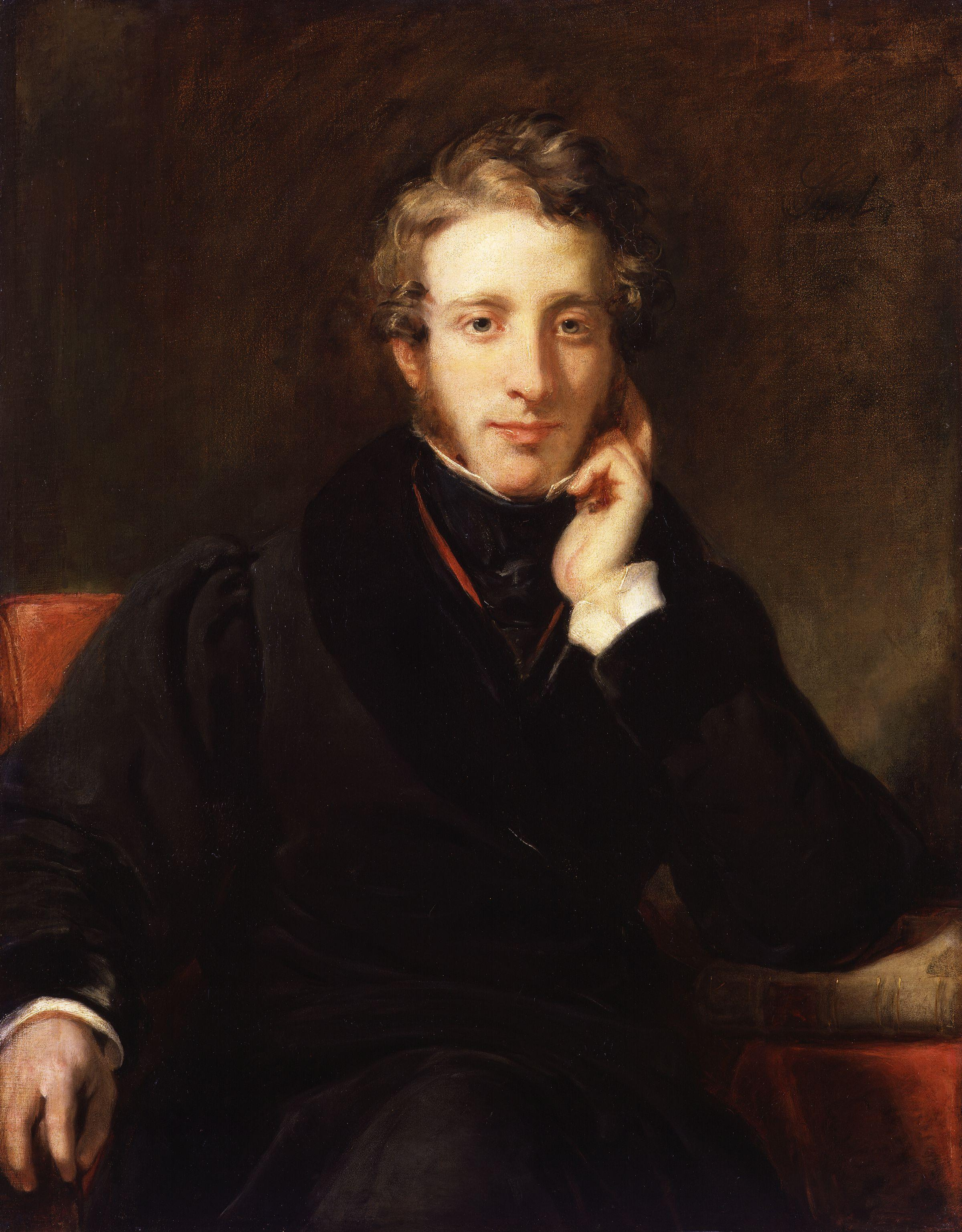
Portrait of Edward Bulwer-Lytton by Henry William Pickersgill, 1831

The exact sentence was coined by Lytton in 1839 for his play Richelieu; Or the Conspiracy. The play was about Cardinal Richelieu, though in the author's words "license with dates and details ... has been, though not unsparingly, indulged". The Cardinal's line in Act II, scene II, was more fully:

True,—This!
Beneath the rule of men entirely great
The pen is mightier than the sword. Behold
The arch-enchanters wand!— itself a nothing!—
But taking sorcery from the master-hand
To paralyse the Cæsars—and to strike
The loud earth breathless!—Take away the sword—

States can be saved without it!

The play opened at London's Covent Garden Theatre on 7 March 1839 with William Charles Macready in the lead role. Macready believed its opening night success was "unequivocal"; Queen Victoria attended a performance on 14 March.

In 1870, literary critic Edward Sherman Gould wrote that Bulwer "had the good fortune to do, what few men can hope to do: he wrote a line that is likely to live for ages". By 1888 another author, Charles Sharp, feared that repeating the phrase "might sound trite and commonplace". The Thomas Jefferson Building of the Library of Congress, which opened in 1897, has the adage decorating an interior wall. Although Bulwer's phrasing was novel, the idea of communication surpassing violence in efficacy had numerous predecessors.

The saying quickly gained currency, says Susan Ratcliffe, associate editor of the Oxford Quotations Dictionaries. "By the 1840s it was a commonplace."

== Predecessors ==
=== Earliest sources ===
Assyrian sage Ahiqar, who reputedly lived during the early 7th century BCE, coined the first known version of this phrase. One copy of the Teachings of Ahiqar, dating to about 500 BCE, states, "The word is mightier than the sword."

=== Islamic sources ===
"The ink of the scholar is holier than the blood of the martyr" is a similar phrase attributed to the Islamic prophet Muhammad in a hadith.

Muhammad is also quoted in a saying narrated by 'Abdullah ibn Amr: "There will be a tribulation that will wipe out the Arabs in which those killed on both sides are in the Hellfire. In that time the spoken word will be stronger than the sword".

Abu'l-Fazl ibn Mubarak, who died in 1602 and was personal scribe and vizier to Akbar the Great, wrote of a gentleman put in charge of a fiefdom having "been promoted from the pen to the sword and taken his place among those who join the sword to the pen, and are masters both of peace and war." (Note: A source has Abu'l-Fazl ibn Mubarak in Āīn-e Akbari (the third volume of the Akbarnama), quoting his master as saying to his calligraphers "Go on doing with your pen what in other times was done with the sword" but this is spurious. The source is a newspaper article by Ahmed (2002).) Syad Muhammad Latif, in his 1896 history of Agra, quoted King Abdullah of Bokhara (Abdullah-Khan II), who died in 1598, as saying that "He was more afraid of Abu'l-Fazl's pen than of Akbar's sword."

In contrast, Abu Tammam's Ode on the Conquest of Amorium poem intro: "The sword is the truest news [in comparison with] books... In its sharpness, the boundary between seriousness and play".

=== Early pre-Enlightenment sources ===
In 1529, Antonio de Guevara, in Reloj de príncipes, compared a pen to a lance, books to arms, and a life of studying to a life of war. Thomas North, in 1557, translated Reloj de príncipes into English as Diall of Princes. The analogy would appear in again in 1582, in George Whetstone's An Heptameron of Civil Discourses: "The dashe of a Pen, is more greeuous than the counterbuse of a Launce." (Note: It appears as a marginal note to the passage: "The Doctor, that had giuen as many déepe woundes with his Pen, as euer he had doone with his Launce, shronke no more at these threates, then an Oke at the Helue of an Are, but coldely wylled him, to vse his pleasure, he was ready to defend (or to die, in) his oppinion.")

William Shakespeare in 1600, in his play Hamlet Act 2, scene II, wrote: "... many wearing rapiers are afraid of goosequills." (Note: "About the history and origins behind the famous saying the pen is mightier than the sword". Trivia-Library.com. which cites Wallechinsky & Wallace (1981).)

Robert Burton, in 1621, in The Anatomy of Melancholy, stated: "It is an old saying, 'A blow with a word strikes deeper than a blow with a sword': and many men are as much galled with a calumny, a scurrilous and bitter jest, a libel, a pasquil, satire, apologue, epigram, stage-play or the like, as with any misfortune whatsoever." After listing several historical examples he concludes: "Hinc quam sit calamus saevior ense patet", which translates as "From this it is clear how much more cruel the pen may be than the sword."

=== Early modern sources ===
Thomas Jefferson, on 19 June 1792, ended a letter to Thomas Paine with: "Go on then in doing with your pen what in other times was done with the sword: shew that reformation is more practicable by operating on the mind than on the body of man, and be assured that it has not a more sincere votary nor you a more ardent well-wisher than Y[ou]rs. &c. Thomas Jefferson"

Published in 1830, by Joseph Smith, an account in the Book of Mormon related, "The word had a greater tendency to lead the people to do that which was just; yea, it had more powerful effect upon the minds of the people than the sword".

== As motto and slogan ==
- The phrase appeared as the motto of gold pen manufacturer Levi Willcutt during a Railroad Jubilee in Boston, Massachusetts, which ran during the week beginning 17 September 1852.
- The motto appears in the school room illustration on page 168 of the first edition of Mark Twain's The Adventures of Tom Sawyer (1876). The words "pen" and "is" are suspiciously close together leading some scholars to speculate that the illustrator, True Williams, deliberately chose the narrow spacing as a subtle obscene prank.
- It is the motto of the Alpha Xi Delta sorority.
- It is also the motto of Kaisei Academy in Tokyo, Japan.
- In its Latinized form, Calamus Gladio Fortior, it is the motto of Keio University in Tokyo, Japan.
- In another Latinized form, Cedit Ensis Calamo, it is the motto of the Authors' Club of London, founded by Walter Besant in 1891.
- In another Latinized form, Doctrina Fortior Armis, it is the motto of Hipperholme Grammar School, in West Yorkshire, England.

== See also ==
- Almighty dollar
- Might makes right
- Nonviolent resistance
- Las armas y las letras
