= Model of masculinity under fascist Italy =

Political concept of masculinity in fascist Italy

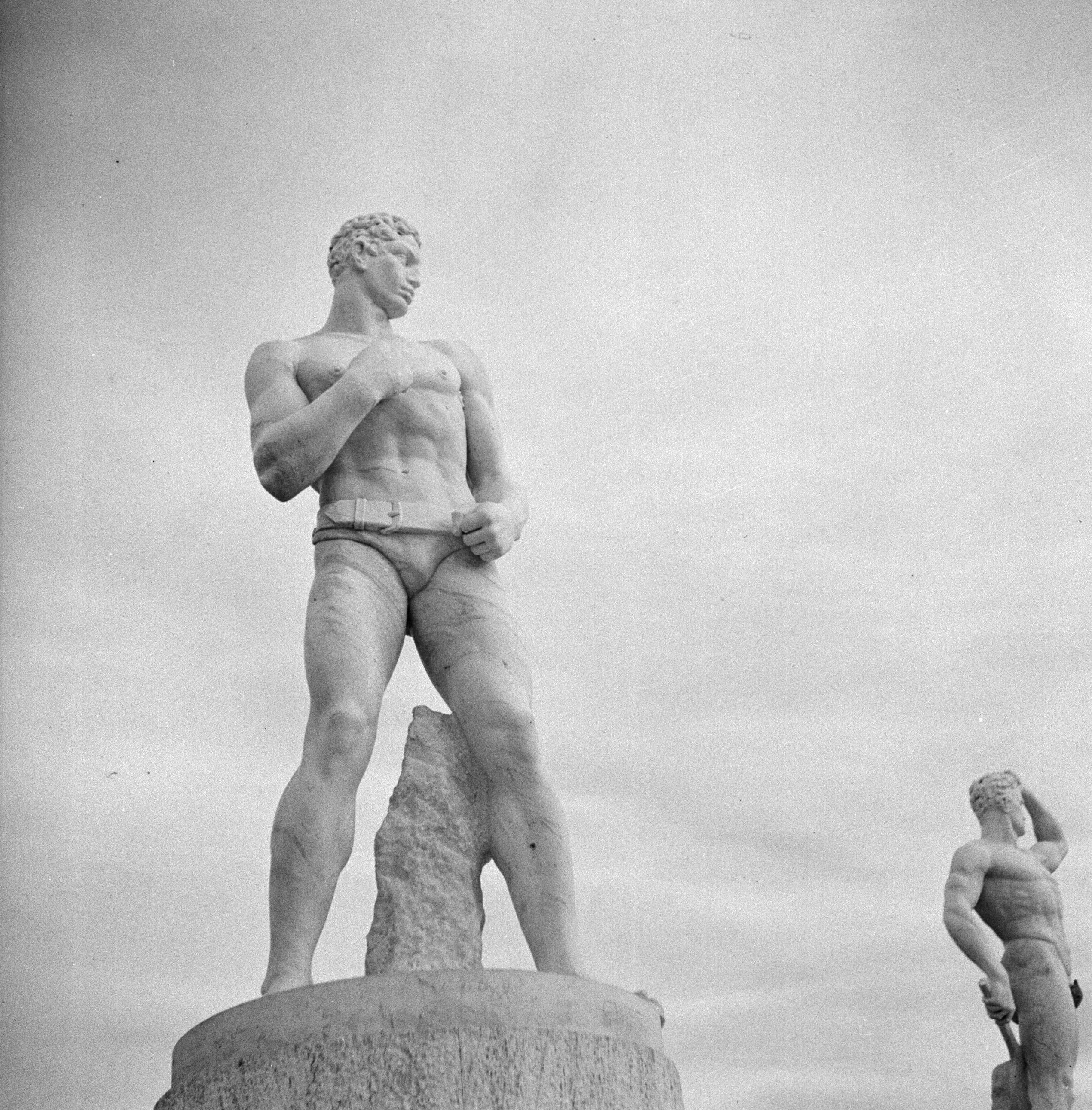
Statue of a wrestler, Foro Italico.

The model of masculinity under fascist Italy was an idealized version of masculinity prescribed by dictator Benito Mussolini during his reign as fascist dictator of Italy from 1925—1945. This model of masculinity, grounded in anti-modernism and traditional gender roles, was intended to help create a New Italian citizen in a budding New Italy. The model represents a mix between purported Roman ideal, comprising both mental and physical qualities. As such, it was later superimposed onto the political persona portrayed by Mussolini himself as he rallied to gather popular support for his fascist state.

== Earlier movements and influences ==
Following the birth of the Kingdom of Italy in 1861, the state was still culturally fragmented. Following World War I, there was an uprising of civil religion in Italy as a "state of collective euphoria" roused the nation.

In 1909, Filippo Tommaso Marinetti founded the Futurist Movement, which advocated values such as instinct, strength, courage, sport, war, youth, dynamism and speed as exemplified by modern machines. Amid the introduction of this revolutionary, non-conformist ideology, it did not agree with the political philosophies of fascism, which was also just beginning to bud at that time. Futurism was thereby abandoned after 1920, and political regions became increasingly fervent as Mussolini came into power shortly thereafter.

Mussolini, after having been elected to power in 1922, created a myth of himself, craftily adapting the image of the Übermensch of German philosopher Friedrich Nietzsche to the Italian forma mentis, which was grounded in the following credo: absolutely hegemony over life and death and good and evil.

Mussolini underlined how Nietzsche had advocated an imminent return to the ideal, stating that "a new kind of 'free spirit' will come, strengthened by the war ... spirits equipped with a kind of sublime perversity ... new, free spirits, who will triumph over God and over Nothing!" Accordingly, war was regarded as the training ground of virility: a place to cultivate, embrace, and exercise masculinity to its fullest extent in the name of serving for one's nation with others as a collective entity. Novelist Mario Carli provides a first-hand account of what was expected of Italian soldiers in this era:

[W]ar is something sublime because it forces every man to face the dilemma of choosing between heroism and cowardice, between the ideal and the stomach, between the spiritual instinct to project life beyond the material, and the pure and simple instinct of animal conservation. It is the brutal discriminator that distinguishes man from man, character from character, constitution from constitution: on the one side the cowardly, the soft, the hysterical, the effeminate, the cry-babies, the mommy's boys; on the other the strong, the aware, the idealists, the mystics of danger, those who triumph over fear and those who are courageous by nature, the hot-blooded heroes and the heroes of the will.

The wartime climate provided an opportune environment for Mussolini to reinforce the values which he extolled as central to his purported hegemonic masculinity. In addition, the wartime front provided a public stage for effective public actions. Mussolini openly boasted about conducting his efforts to introduce himself as a New Italian for the New Italy that was to come.

== Mussolini's exalted virility: a fascist anti-modernism ==
Fascist anti-modernism is a political ideology that consists of these salient elements: ruralism, anti-urbanism, anti-intellectualism, anti-bourgeoisie, anti-feminism, and pro-natalism.

The fascist regime imparted a carefully controlled, diversely dispersed propaganda which was in the name of delivering the New Italian, or the New Italy. Public media was monitored: newspapers, magazines, as well as lowbrow popular romances and biographies, were rigorously controlled by the regime because they were broadly diffused throughout society, and the implications of the public of Mussolini could be positive or negative depending on the content of such mass media. Also, overt suggestions were made as to the proper conducts of an ideal Roman citizen: exaltation of the virile, dominant, and nationalistic masculine identity. The term 'virility' represents a key feature of the fascist vision of the world. The imparting of this hegemonic masculinity had the purpose of allowing fascist leaders to maintain their status quo, aside from the management of their public image. It is for this reason that all forms of 'modern' masculinity were seen as a direct threat to the stability of the fascist state, and thus were actively rendered obsolete.

As an ideology that prefers traditional ways, fascism emphasized a hierarchical relationship between male and female relations, one that was grounded in a patriarchal view of gender dynamics. Arguments were made by the fascist government that the involvement of female workers in traditionally all-male workplaces would disrupt the power hierarchy that supported society. In addition, arguments were put forth that a mother working in the workplace would be transferring all her maternal responsibilities to that of the husband, which may become exasperated with the aspect of familial caretaking all together, further endangering the integrity and sustenance of the family unit. As per issues involving masculinity, fascist rhetoric advocated for misogynistic, homophobic, and virilistic values in their campaign during the 1920s and made direct references as to the accepted and unaccepted gender codes, as explained in this passage:

The deviant male was above all a bourgeois, egoistic and unpatriotic as well as scarcely virile (because he was unfit or reluctant to repeatedly impregnate the female); the deviant female was the too 'modern' woman, Americanized, independent and masculinized. The social damages provoked by these two converging deviants were most serious: a widespread and excessive loosening of family hierarchical relations, a decline in the main of that robust virility that fascism, with much love and perseverance, pursues in other ways.

=== Ruralism ===
The rural man was exalted to be among the ideal hegemonic forms of masculinity by the fascist government because it did not pose a direct threat to the integrity of the fascist government. It was traditional, and it was anti-modern. Ardegno Soffici describes such hegemonic masculinity as apparent in rural Italy:

... with their sobriety, the strength of their bared arms, tanned by the sun, and their savage resistance to work and fatigue, represented ... a solemn lesson in virility.

As the antithesis of the bourgeoisie, such a figure was iconic of the suggestions put forth by the fascist government as the way to be when it came down to cultivating masculinity. It is important to keep in mind that fascist ruralism aimed explicitly at the restoration of a traditional, pre-modern and rigidly hierarchical moral order. In other words, the fascist regime used the depiction of ruralism as a gateway through the regime attempted to revert modernism to traditionalism thinking styles, which were far from modernism, deeply rooted in traditionalism. In this respect, village youth that sought to leave the village and relocate to larger cities were portrayed as individuals putting the fate of the nation at risk through their behavior:

The various phases of the process of disease and death are also precisely demonstrated, and they bear a name that summarizes them all: urbanism and metropolitanism, as the author explains ... The metropolis grows, attracting people from the countryside, who, however, as soon as they are urbanized, become – just like the pre-existing population – infertile. The fields turn to desert; but when the abandoned and burned regions spread, the metropolis is caught by the throat: neither its business nor its industries nor its oceans of stone and reinforced concrete can re-establish the balance that by now is irreparably broken: it is a catastrophe.

Modernism, one phenomenon which includes the relocation of youth from villages to more developed urban cities, is seen in negative light by the fascist government because it is creating a sub-type of Italian masculinity that is more adept in living within metropolitan areas, taking on less responsibilities suggested by the regime (as indicative of hegemonic masculinity). In other words, the Italian youth are no longer working in the farmlands cultivating the soil, but are instead, "de-masculinizing" themselves in the light of the fascist government and rendering the entire Italian country less fertile. Metaphorically, this means that they are cultivating less of their hegemonic masculinity that they should be embracing, and physically, they are contributing less to the state because those that move into the city usually have less children and marry less frequently, the regime argued. In addition, the safe environment of the metropolis prevents the New Italian (male) from enjoying his contact with nature, and has prevented him from contemplating deeply about the moral challenges, none of which are brought upon to him as a result of the artificial, "materialistic" metropolitan atmosphere that is void of dangers and adversities.

=== Anti-intellectualism ===
Intellectuals were seen as a threat by the Fascist regime because they advocated for a masculinity which was associated with the bourgeoisie. More importantly, the values upheld by the intellectual class were in direct opposition to the values advocated by the fascist government, which were the exaltation of action, impulsivity, and youth. Youth was amongst the many ambiguous terms employed by the fascist government to manipulate the public's perception of hegemonic masculinity. It was ambiguous in that the term was often used to refer to the promising potentialities of current, present-day youth, as well as the youthful Roman soldiers, gleaming with their sharp mind and shining armor, eons ago. This narrative passage provides the stance on intellectualism very clearly:

What is intellectualism? It is important to avoid misunderstandings in this regard. Intellectualism is a sort of infertile intelligence, an intelligence without virility. Intellectualism is a disease of the intelligence .... Intellectualism is a pathological International, like the hymn of the sexually inverted or the anarchists who are that way because nature was cruel to them .... Their function is in fact feminine, but in the worst sense, for it is a femininity that will never be material.

As such, intellectualism was defined by the fascists as a pathology of masculinity.

=== Anti-feminism ===
During this era, there was a salient, overarching belief grounded in science that females were biologically inferior to men. It is for this reason that a prevalence of feminine elements in a person corresponded to an actual regression of the human being on the evolutionary scale. It is for this reason that the active pursuit of vehement exercising and modern sports activities was strongly suggested as a measure to increase masculinity and combat any signs of femininity in one's lifestyle. In other words, it was through the indoctrination of the belief that weak males were inferior like females that Mussolini raised the importance of sport and exercise, which he managed to list as one of the essential quotas for qualifying as an acceptable male in the New Italy.

The effort by Mussolini to exalt the inferiority of females in relation to men created an imbalance in the public sphere. Women were forced and coerced to stay and remain in the domestic sphere, and the public generated an environment where this was deemed a convention: countless novels, moralizing works and articles of all sorts of publication aimed to exalt the woman as wife and mother and extinguish any spark of the terrible modernist conflagration. In this way, in the name of maintaining status quo, women were rendered into means of achieving and maintaining male supremacy: a representation of the 'new woman' in pathological terms was advanced in order to trace a line between orthodoxy and deviance, but the description of a monstrous figure devoid of feminity, rather than presenting a solution to the problem, often achieved the effect of amplifying the very sense of alarm that the problem itself provoked". Females were forced to remain as figures of antiquity, stationary, serving as an unchanging foundation onto which males stood on to maintain their supremacy. The theme of rejecting feminism has been prevailing throughout Italy's history, dating back to the days of peasant farmers and feudal lords.

=== Anti-bourgeois ===
The fascist regime regarded the bourgeois as an obstacle of modernism because of its purported par excellence. The bourgeois and the bourgeois spirit were exploited, with the latter being used to manipulate the public. For example, Benito Mussolini, in a 1938 speech, voiced the clear distinction between capitalism and bourgeoisie, in which case he described the bourgeoisie as a moral category, a state of mind. In the final years of the regime, interests of Catholic circles and that of Benito Mussolini merged. During this period, one priest who founded the journal Frontespizio, Giuseppe De Luca, declared that:

Christianity is essentially anti-bourgeois .... A Christian, a true Christian and thus a Catholic, is the opposite of a bourgeois.

The bourgeois was perceived as unmanly, effeminate, and infantile in the following quote:

Middle class, middle man, incapable of great virtue or great vice: and there would be nothing wrong with that if only he would be willing to remain as such; but when his childlike or feminine tendency to camouflage pushes him to dream of grandeur, honors, and thus riches, which he cannot achieve honestly with his own 'second-rate' powers, then the average man compensates with cunning, schemes, and mischief; he kicks out ethics and becomes a bourgeois. The bourgeois is the average man who does not accept to remain such and who, lacking the strength sufficient for the conquest of essential values – those of the spirit – opts for material ones, for appearances.

The economic freedom and mobility as exemplified by the bourgeois posed a direct threat to the integrity of the fascist regime. If and when the bourgeois gain power, there is the potential loss of control and unity as maintained by the state, so this is seen as threatening by Mussolini and his followers. To become bourgeois was still a fault pertaining to the masculine mystique: not by change, shortly after, the bourgeois was scornfully defined as someone who was "spiritually castrated".

== Mussolini as the hegemonic male ==
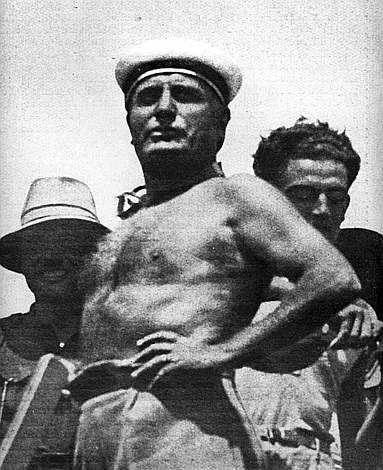
Mussolini during the Battle for Grain

It was at the beginning of the century that the code of the Superman was embraced in Italy, with the purpose of infusing new life into what ought to be pursued as the New Man (or New Italian), or the masculine ideal, in addition to that of the New Italy, which for Benito Mussolini, signified a fascist government where he was the dictator in full control. He mandated that the New Man be brutal, barbarous, and abandon his romanticism. His conception of the New Futurist Man, building on previous futurist concepts, entailed: disdain of death and books, in love with virility, violence, and war; a people particularly endowed with "creative genius, elasticity in improvisation, strength, ability and physical resistance, impetus, violence, fury in the fight". It is evident through such descriptions of what a Roman male ought to be, that Mussolini is keenly tying in together political propaganda and proscribed, normative gender constructs. For example, a special emphasis on uniformity was given to the Fascist socialization of the Italian people to minimize the chance of a possible revolt against his regime, and the effective mobilization of the Italian army in time of war.

Mussolini presented himself as the perfect prototype of the New Italian, being the "living and working model of ethical and political individuality' to which the Italians had to aspire.

=== Institutionalization ===
Institutional measures were put in place to accelerate the process of acculturation of individuals into the political ideology purported by Mussolini: schools, physical education programs, and mandatory military service to the state. In other words, measures were devised by the fascist state to maximize the infiltration of the fascist ideology with regards to normative masculine ways of life. The shape of the New Italian via fascisticization took on the form of physically, mentally, and spiritually connecting oneself with the past.

Mussolini purported the eighteenth-century belief that a well-structured mind requires the cultivation of a well-structured body. He believed that the virility of male bodies was essential to reconstruct in a modern context the ancient and warlike 'Italian descent' as the National, then European and finally International model. The New Italian was encouraged to assume the Fascist style, which included canons of male beauty as advocated by the regime. He had to personify mens sana in corpore sano, on behalf of the Roman spirit and in the service of the cause. It is evident that, drawing on his beliefs of traditionalism, he is attempting to refine his conception of the ancient Roman empire to the fullest, illustrating the ancient virtues in present-day military discipline of mind, body, and soul.

Opera Nazionale ed Maternita ed Infanzia (ONMI) was founded in 1925 and specialized in the physical and moral improvement of the Italian race, accepting children up to three years old as well as mothers who provided assistance to staff. Young students from 8 to 14 years of age were then enlisted in the Opera Nazionale Balilla (ONB), founded a year after the ONMI, which sought to engrain the fundamentals of fascism on a deeper level, into the conscious: students were organized in groups with names evoking the Roman spirit, the country and war.

Students that did not pursue advanced studies were mandated to enlist in the Milizia Volontaria per la Sicurezza Nazionale (MVSN), and from 1930, the Fasci Giovanili di Combattimento (FGC). As organizations devoted to develop military character in preparation for conscription, they served the needs of the fascist government in the interest of maintaining a united government with an army ready when the safety of the nation was at stake. In addition to the aforementioned institutions, universities such as the Universitari Fascisti (GUF) and Opera Nazionale Dopolavoro were all devoted to the furthering of the fascist regime, and the subsequent spreading of a military character, the spreading of the New Italian.

It is evident that through these institutions, the Fascist regime insinuated itself into the Italian social fabric, endeavouring to fascisticize the world of school, work, and free time. Fascism is, in other words, permeating into all sectors of society. Mussolini illustrated his perception of masculinity, as well as its connection to sports, with the famous Stadio dei marmi statues, commissioned and supplied under his incentives by the sixty Italian provinces.

Marinetti described that: "Male children must, according to us, be training far differently from female children, because their early games are clearly masculine ones—that is without affective morbidity, womanish sensibility—but lively, bellicose, muscular and violently dynamic. The successful transmission of such virtues may have resulted in the prevalence of bullying in some present-day intuitions, as discussed in one article titled "The Role of Masculinity in Children's Bullying" (2006) which concludes that for a small population of children in an Italian elementary school, bullying is a method with which males exert their masculine prowess over another.

Some scholarship suggests that, being an imperfect or partial totalitarianism, fascism could only implement this model of masculinity to a limited degree. Pointing to a variety of factors—the advent of Taylorism in Italy, the catholicity of the regime's patronage strategies, its support among industrialists, and the contradictions of modern masculinity itself—such scholarship highlights ventennio representations of masculinity that offered a counter to this bellicose model. These include, for example, the paintings of homosexual artists such as Corrado Cagli, Filippo de Pisis and Guglielmo Janni, the poetry of Sandro Penna, and composer Mario Castelnuovo-Tedesco's 1936 setting of several of Walt Whitman's Calamus poems.
