= Sound Body Sound Mind =

UCLA Health Sound Body Sound Mind is a United States nonprofit organization (501(c)(3)) that promotes self-confidence and healthy lifestyle choices among children. The Foundation was established by Cindy and Bill Simon in 1999 and is currently based in Los Angeles, California. On March 6, 2015 the Sound Body Sound Mind Foundation joined forces with UCLA Health System in order to further expand their reach within the Los Angeles community.

== Work ==
UCLA Health Sound Body Sound Mind combats childhood obesity by implementing fitness centers in middle and high schools in California, Colorado, Florida and Texas area. The Foundation also trains physical educators to expand their knowledge and impact on today’s youth. The selected physical educators are taught based on the Sound Body Sound Mind Curriculum which is a compilation of 36 lessons that generates an environment that endorses confidence and competence in their students. Sound Body Sound Mind has partnered with over 100 schools, impacted over 100,000 students per year, donated over $4 million and trained over 400 physical educators. In early 2012, Sound Body Sound Mind added two new grants to their program, the Maintenance and Afterschool grants. The Maintenance grant allocates $5,000 to partner schools to maintain the equipment in their Sound Body Sound Mind Fitness Center. The Foundation’s Afterschool grant allots $2500 to partner schools for supervision of the Sound Body Sound Mind Fitness center after school hours.
