= Francisco Cascales =

Spanish writer (1564–1642)

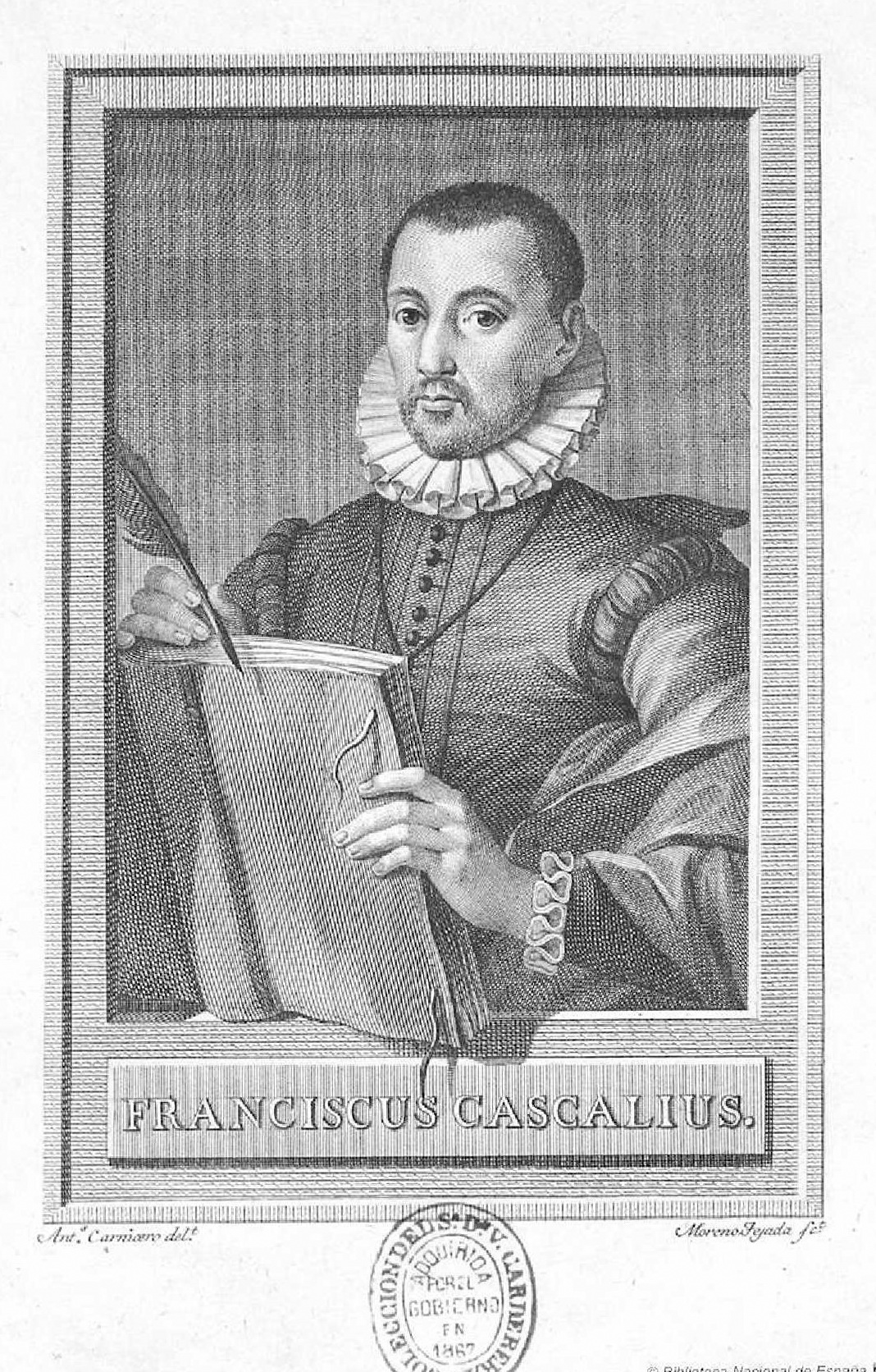
Portrait of Francisco Cascales, calcographic engraving by Juan Moreno de Tejada by drawing by Antonio Carnicero for the edition of the Tablas poéticas printed in Madrid in 1779. Biblioteca Nacional de España.

Francisco Cascales (1564–1642) was a Spanish erudite, humanist and writer. He wrote Discurso de la ciudad de Cartagena.

== Life ==
Very little is known about the writer's family; he appears to have had a twin brother. He never mentions his parents in his works, nor does he talk of his family or their circumstances like other writers of the period, which has led some to speculate that he may have been a natural child.

After studying grammar, he joined the military (1585) and travelled to the Netherlands and France. He spent a large part of his youth in these areas, before returning to Spain. He had contact with distinguished humanists of the period and travelled through Italy, where he perhaps attended university. In Cartagena, he befriended Luis Carrillo y Sotomayor, whose use of the culteranismo style he strongly opposed.

It was also here that he wrote his work Discurso de la ciudad de Cartagena (1598), in which he praises the poets of the region. Here he obtained a post lecturing in rhetoric before teaching at the Seminario Mayor de San Fulgencio in Murcia. He seems to have composed several autos and comedias, now lost, for festivals in honour of this patron. Discursos históricos de la muy noble y muy leal ciudad de Murcia (1621), on the other hand, has been conserved, and is a work which he compiled as a chronicler. He married three times, but only had children with his final wife, the sister of poets Pedro and Bartolomé Ferrer Muñoz. While he was still young, it seems that he was imprisoned in the castle at Chinchilla.

Part of his humanist ideology advocated what is known as eclectic imitation, a technique which he used widely in his own writings. As a poet he also earned the praise of his friend Lope de Vega in El laurel de Apolo. He also wrote Latin epigrams inspired by Marcus Valerius Martialis, and translated Horace's Ars Poetica into Spanish. He also composed the Florilegio de versificación and started an Epopeya del Cid which he was never able to complete.

== Cartas filológicas ==
The Cartas filológicas is indisputably his most celebrated work. The book takes the form of a confidential correspondence between Cascales and contemporary scholars. This correspondence was compiled and published in 1626. The Cartas filológicas tackles a wide variety of topics, adopting a very clear essayistic style, through which he discusses ideas on history and aesthetic. Some of these ideas were controversial, such as his opinions on the works of Luis de Góngora, but Cascales works on the premises of promoting his own ingenuity through his discussions.
