= Cristóbal Mosquera de Figueroa =

Spanish poet and writer

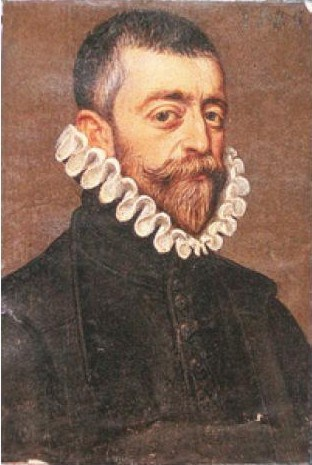
Cristóbal Mosquera de Figueroa, by Felipe de Liaño.

Cristóbal Mosquera de Figueroa (1547–1610) was a Spanish poet and writer. He was corregidor of Utrera, El Puerto de Santa María and Écija.
