= Juan Boscán Almogáver =

Spanish poet (c.1490–1542)

Joan Boscà i Almogàver (Catalan pronunciation: [ʒuˈam busˈkaj əlmuˈɣaβə], Spanish: Juan Boscán Almogávar; c. 1490 – 21 September 1542), was the first Catalonian poet to write in Spanish. He is known for having incorporated hendecasyllable verses into Spanish.

== Biography ==
The exact date of birth for Boscà is unclear, but there is a consensus that he was born anywhere between 1487 and 1492. Boscà was born in Barcelona and was one of three children. His father, Joan Valentí Boscà, was a public official, and his mother was named Violant Almogàver. Boscà's father died in 1492. Around 1507, Boscà left to live in the court of Fernando and Isabel, where he was a student of Lucio Marineo Siculo from Vizzini, Italy, who taught him the skill of translating Italian love poetry, Latin, and Greek lyrics into Spanish. Marineo's teachings evidence the close cultural interactions that existed between Spain and Italy and helped to develop the talent of Boscán.

By 1522, Joan Boscà was working as a tutor to Fernando Álvarez de Toledo, Duke of Alba. In this same year, he participated with Garcilaso de la Vega in giving naval assistance to the Isle of Rhodes during a Turkish invasion. Boscà fought against the Turks again in 1532 with Álvarez de Toledo and Charles I in Vienna. During this period, Boscán had made serious progress in his mastery of verse in the Italian style.

Boscà is most famous for the incorporation of hendecasyllable verses into Spanish. Although he was preceded by Íñigo López de Mendoza, 1st Marquess of Santillana, who wrote 42 sonnets in the Italian style, Boscà was one of the first people to use the present-day structures of the sonnet in Castilian. His originality and open-minded nature made him an innovator, and his use of hendecasyllabic verse gave his poetry a distinctly creative flare that allowed him to emphasize the emotions and significance of each poem.

In the 1520s he came under the influence of Andrea Navagero, the Venetian ambassador to Spain. It is because of Navagiero's persuasion that Boscà abandoned the traditional eight-syllable verses of Spanish poetry. Boscán was also influenced by another Italian ambassador (a friend of Navagiero) named Count Baldassare Castiglione. Boscán was urged by Castiglione and Garcilaso to translate the ambassador's "Il Cortegiano" into Spanish, which was published on 2 April 1534 to great success.

With Boscán's fame came great controversy, because he constantly had to combat with those who preferred the old style of poetry over the new. In 1539, he married Ana Girón de Rebolledo of Valencia and fathered three daughters. Boscán died on 21 September 1542 after becoming ill in Perpignan, while he was preparing some of his poetry for publication.

== Works ==
Joan Boscà's most famous works appear in Las obras de Boscán y algunas de Garcilaso de la Vega repartidas en quatro libros (The Works of Boscà and Some of Garcilaso de la Vega Divided in Four Volumes). In volume three, this includes Leandro y Hero (Leander and Hero), based on an ancient Greek fable and Ottava Rima (Royal Octave). A stanza of "Ottava Rima" reads:

Amor es todo quanto aquí se trata;
es la sazón del tiempo enamorada;
todo muere d'amor o d'amor mata;
sin amor no veréyes ni una pisada;
d'amores se negocia y se barata;
toda la tierra en esto es ocupada;
si veys bullir d'un árbol una hoja,
diréys que amor aquello se os antoja

Translation:

Love is everything treated here;
it is love's season;
all dies of love or kills for love;
without love you'll see hardly a footstep;
with love, you trade and barter;
the entire world is thus occupied;
if a tree's leaf buds
you will say that love tickles your desire.

Carlos Clavería, who has edited Boscán´s work, affirms that the reader who reaches the third book will find veritable treasures, including the above cited mythological poem based on Musaeus and with touches of Virgil and Hesiod. The reader will also find a Petrarchan poem that has includes a very surprising turn. Capítulo, which begins in a rather conventional manner, but then turns to describe in the last thirty-two tercets a painting from antiquity: Timanthes's The Sacrifice of Iphigenia best known for the veil worn by Agamemnon, her father, since the poet was unable to show his immense suffering. This is one of the earliest ekphrasis found in Iberian Renaissance poetry. What cannot be shown or described in the poem is the extreme jealousy felt by the poetic voice.

== Later reputation ==
Boscán's and his close friend Garcilaso de la Vega (whom he met at the Spanish court) are seen as very influential in the poetry of the Spanish Renaissance. Boscán was the first poet to introduce the Italian metres to Spain.

Boscán’s poems were published after his death by his widow around 1543 (Garcilaso died in 1536 and Boscà was given the task of editing some of his works before his own death on September 21, 1542). The collection proved popular: between 1543 and 1597, twenty-one editions were printed throughout Europe. While the collection was supposed to focus mainly on his poetry, Boscán was soon overshadowed by his friend Garcilaso. In contrast to Garcilaso, who explored several genres and themes in the new Italian style, Boscán wrote mostly about love. He has been compared to Fray Luis de León, a poet and professor of the 16th century, who also enjoyed the process of translating and writing poetry.

One of his works, Oh Sombra!, was adapted into a song by the British rock band Electrelane in 2004.
