= Diocese of Ugento-Santa Maria di Leuca =

Roman Catholic diocese in Italy

Coordinates: 39.9333°N 18.1667°E

Diocese of Ugento-Santa Maria di Leuca Dioecesis Uxentina-S. Mariae Leucadensis

Catholic
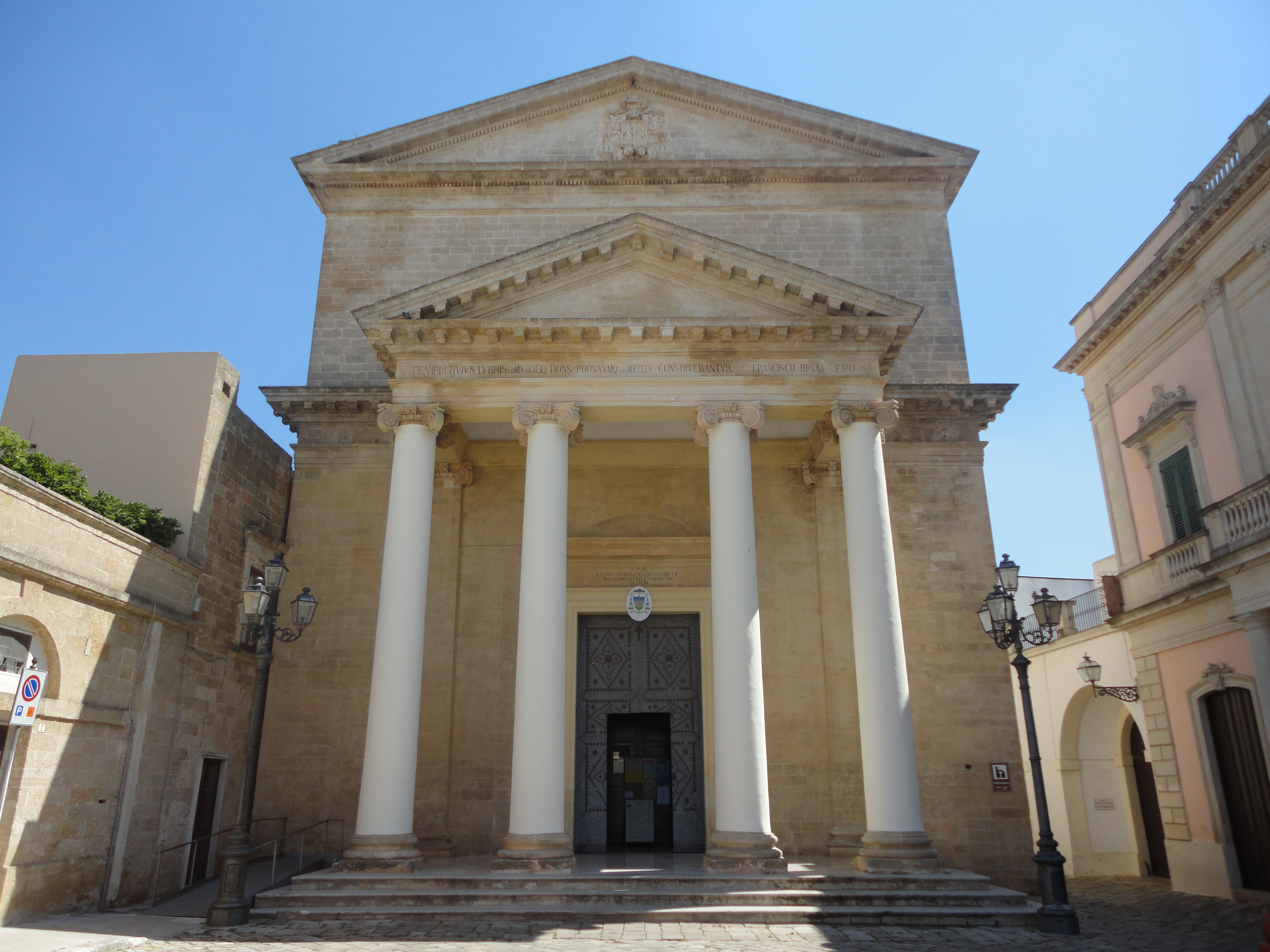
- Ugento Cathedral

Location
- Country: Italy
- Ecclesiastical province: Lecce

Statistics
- Area: 475 km^{2} (183 sq mi)
- Population: Total; Catholics: (as of 2023); 125,750 (est.); 124,793 ▲
- Parishes: 43

Information
- Denomination: Catholic Church
- Rite: Roman Rite
- Established: 13th century
- Cathedral: Cattedrale di Maria SS. Assunta in Cielo
- Secular priests: 65 (diocesan) ▼7 (Religious Orders) ▼7 Permanent Deacons

Current leadership
- Pope: Leo XIV
- Bishop: Vito Angiuli

Website
- www.diocesiugento.org

The Diocese of Ugento-Santa Maria di Leuca (Latin: Dioecesis Uxentina-S. Mariae Leucadensis) is a Latin diocese of the Catholic Church in Apulia, has existed under this name since 1959. It is a suffragan of the Archdiocese of Lecce. The historic Diocese of Ugento has existed since the thirteenth century.

== History ==
While it was part of the Byzantine empire, Ugento had Greek bishops and was subject to the Patriarch of Constantinople. Ugento was destroyed by the Saracens in the 8th century, and by the Turks in 1527. The earliest recorded bishop, Joannes, is known from a Greek liturgical text, and he may have been a Greek bishop. The Greek rite flourished in many places in the diocese of Ugento until 1591.

Of the Latin bishops, the earliest known is the Benedictine monk of Montecassino, Symon, of unknown date.

The Latin diocese used to be a suffragan of the archdiocese of Otranto, until 1980.

=== Concordat of 1818: Consolidation ===
In 1818, a new concordat with the Kingdom of the Two Sicilies committed the pope to the suppression of more than fifty small dioceses in the kingdom. In the ecclesiastical province of Otranto, the diocese of Alessano, formerly a suffragan of Otranto, was suppressed by Pope Pius VII in the bull "De Utiliori" of 27 June 1818, and its territory incorporated into the diocese of Ugento. In the same concordat, the King acquired the right to nominate candidates for vacant bishoprics. That situation persisted down until the final overthrow of the Bourbon monarchy in 1860.

=== Additional name ===
In 1959, Bishop Giuseppe Ruotolo (1937–1968) petitioned the Vatican for permission to add the name of the local manifestation of the Virgin Mary, S. Maria de Leuca, to the name of the diocese. His stated reasons were: to strengthen the traditional devotion of his people to the Virgin; to obtain favors from the Virgin; and to strengthen the bonds that connected his people with the Papacy. Pope John XXIII approved the petition, and on 1 August 1959 the Sacred Consistorial Congregation authorized the change, and delegated to Bishop Ruotolo all the necessary and appropriate powers to bring the change into effect. He was required to supply the Congregation with an authentic copy of the act which brought about the change. The change brought no alteration in the constitution, administration, or operation of the diocese.

=== New ecclesiastical province ===
Following the Second Vatican Council, and in accordance with the norms laid out in the Council's decree, Christus Dominus chapter 40, the Episcopal Conference of Apulia petitioned the Holy See (Pope) that Lecce be made a metropolitan and that a new ecclesiastical province be created. After wide consultations among all affected parties, Pope John Paul II issued a decree on 20 October 1980, elevating Lecce to the status of metropolitan see. He also created the new ecclesiastical province of Lecce, whose constituent bishoprics (suffragans) were to be: Brindisi (no longer a metropolitanate, though the archbishop allowed to retain the title of archbishop), Otranto (no longer a metropolitanate, though the archbishop allowed to retain the title of archbishop), Gallipoli, Nardò, Ostuno, and Uxentina-S. Mariae Leucadensis (Ugento).

Pope Francis visited the Diocese on Friday 20 April 2018.

=== Cathedral and Chapter ===
The cathedral of Ugento was originally dedicated in honor of S. Vincent of Saragossa. When a new cathedral was built, in 1745 it was dedicated to the taking up (assumption) of the body of the Virgin Mary into heaven.

The cathedral was administered by a Chapter. The Cantor and Chapter are mentioned in the letter of Pope Martin IV on 23 November 1282, in which he approves their request to have Bishop Goffredus of Leuca transferred to Ugento as their bishop in succession to the late Bishop Lando. In 1705, there were three dignities and twelve Canons in the Chapter. In the mid-nineteenth century, the Chapter consisted of only one dignity, the Cantor, and ten Canons.

=== Synods ===
A diocesan synod was an irregularly held, but important, meeting of the bishop of a diocese and his clergy. Its purpose was (1) to proclaim generally the various decrees already issued by the bishop; (2) to discuss and ratify measures on which the bishop chose to consult with his clergy; (3) to publish statutes and decrees of the diocesan synod, of the provincial synod, and of the Holy See.

Bishop Ludovico Ximenes (Jiménez) (1627–1636) held a diocesan synod on 26 November 1628. On 3 August 1645, Bishop Girolamo Martini (1637–1648) presided over a diocesan synod. Bishop Antonio Carafa (1663–1704) held a diocesan synod on 27 October 1680, his second synod. The Vicar Capitular, Giuseppe Felice Salzedo, held a synod in the cathedral on 20 May 1720.

== Bishops of Ugento ==
=== to 1450 ===
...

- Joannes (attested before c.1175)

...

- Symon (13th cent.)

...

- Anonymous (c. 1195–1198)

...

- Anonymous (c. 1230–1238)
- Anonymous (attested 1238)

...

- Landus de Vicoalbo (attested 1253–1280)
- Gottfredus (1282– )
- Aegidius (1283)
- Joannes Allegri (1284–1291)
- Joannes (1291– )
- Nicolaus
- Joannes (1363– )
- Leonardus ( –1392) (Roman Obedience)
- Thomas (1392–1399) (Roman Obedience)
- Joannes (1399–1401)
- Thomas (1401–1405) (Roman Obedience)
- Onofrio da Sulmona, O.E.S.A. (1405–1427) (Roman Obedience)
- Joannes (1427–1437)
- Nuccio da Nentono, O.Min. (1438–1446)
- Philippus (1446– ? )

=== 1450 to 1700 ===
- Dominicus Erach
- Nicolaus ( ? –1489)
- Antonio Giaconi (1489–1494)
- Maurus de Sinibaldis (1499–1517)
- Andreas (1517–1530)
- Carlo Borromeo (9 Mar 1530 –1537)
- Bonaventura de S. Leone, O.Min. (1537-1558)
- Sebastiano Antonio Minturno (27 Jan 1559 –1565)
- Desiderio Mezzapica, O. Carm. (6 Sep 1566 – 28 Apr 1593 Died)
- Giuseppe de Rossi (11 Mar 1596 – 29 Mar 1599 Appointed, Bishop of L’Aquila)
- Pedro Guerrero (15 Dec 1599 – 1613 Died)
- Lucas de Franchis (27 Jan 1614 – 1615 Died)
- Juan Bravo Lagunas, O.S.A. (11 Jan 1616 – 1627 Resigned)
- Luis Jiménez, O. de M. (1627–1636)
- Girolamo Martini (1637–1648)
- Augustinus Barbosa (1648–1649)
- Andreas Lanfranchi, C.R. (19 Dec 1650 – 1659 Died)
- Lorenzo Díaz de Encinas, O. Carm. (28 Jul 1659 – 23 Nov 1660 Died)

Sede vacante (1660–1663)

- Antonio Carafa, C.R. (12 Feb 1663 – 9 May 1704 Died)

=== 1700 to 1968 ===
- Pedro Lázaro y Terrer, O.F.M. Obs. (1705–1709)

Sede vacante (1709–1713)

- Nicola Spinelli (30 Aug 1713 –1718)

Sede vacante (1718–1722)

- Andrea Maddalena, C.R.M. (1722–1724)
- Francesco Bataller, O. Carm. (19 Dec 1725 – 1 Dec 1735 Died)
- Giovanni Rossi, C.R. (11 Apr 1736 –1737)
- Gennaro Carmignani, C.R. (8 Jul 1737 –1738)
- Arcangelo Ciccarelli, O.P. (19 Dec 1738 – 11 Feb 1747 Resigned)
- Tommaso Mazza (10 Apr 1747 –1768)
- Giovanni Donato Durante (19 Sep 1768 – 10 Sep 1781 Died)
- Giuseppe Monticelli (16 Dec 1782 – 1791 Died)
- Giuseppe Corrado Panzini (26 Mar 1792 – 23 Jul 1811 Died)

Sede vacante (1811–1818)

- Camillo Alleva (26 Jun 1818 – 13 Dec 1824 Resigned)
- Francesco Saverio d'Urso (20 Dec 1824 – 24 Apr 1826 Died)
- Angelico Méstria, O.F.M. Cap. (28 Jan 1828 – 30 Dec 1836 Died)
- Francesco Bruni, C.M. (19 May 1837 – 17 Jan 1863 Died)
- Salvatore Luigi Zola, C.R.L. (21 Mar 1873 –1877)
- Gennaro Maria Maselli, O.F.M. (22 Jun 1877 – 26 Jul 1890 Died)
- Vincenzo Brancia (26 Jul 1890 – 25 Apr 1896 Died)
- Luigi Pugliese (22 Jun 1896 – 17 Jul 1923 Died)
- Antonio Lippolis (15 Dec 1923 – 16 Oct 1924 Resigned)
- Teodorico de Angelis (5 May 1934 –1936)
- Giuseppe Ruotolo (13 Dec 1937 – 9 Nov 1968 Resigned)

=== Bishops of Ugento-Santa Maria di Leuca ===
Name Changed: 1 August 1959

- Michele Mincuzzi (12 Oct 1974 – 27 Jan 1981 Appointed, Bishop of Lecce)
- Mario Miglietta (21 Feb 1981 – 14 Nov 1992 Resigned)
- Domenico Caliandro (23 Apr 1993 – 13 May 2000 Appointed, Bishop of Nardò-Gallipoli)
- Vito De Grisantis (13 May 2000 – 1 Apr 2010 Died)
- Vito Angiuli (2 Oct 2010 – )

== Bibliography ==
=== Reference for bishops ===
- Gams, Pius Bonifatius (1873). Series episcoporum Ecclesiae catholicae: quotquot innotuerunt a beato Petro apostolo (in Latin). Ratisbon: Typis et Sumptibus Georgii Josephi Manz. p. 938.
- Eubel, Conradus, ed. (1913). Hierarchia catholica (in Latin). Vol. Tomus 1 (second ed.). Münster: Libreria Regensbergiana.
- Eubel, Conradus, ed. (1914). Hierarchia catholica (in Latin). Vol. Tomus 2 (second ed.). Münster: Libreria Regensbergiana.
- Gulik, Guilelmus (1923). Eubel, Conradus (ed.). Hierarchia catholica (in Latin). Vol. Tomus 3 (second ed.). Münster: Libreria Regensbergiana.
- Gauchat, Patritius (Patrice) (1935). Hierarchia catholica (in Latin). Vol. Tomus IV (1592-1667). Münster: Libraria Regensbergiana.
- Ritzler, Remigius; Sefrin, Pirminus (1952). Hierarchia catholica medii et recentis aevi V (1667-1730). Patavii: Messagero di S. Antonio.
- Ritzler, Remigius; Sefrin, Pirminus (1958). Hierarchia catholica medii et recentis aevi (in Latin). Vol. Tomus VI (1730-1799). Patavii: Messagero di S. Antonio.
- Ritzler, Remigius; Sefrin, Pirminus (1968). Hierarchia Catholica medii et recentioris aevi sive summorum pontificum, S. R. E. cardinalium, ecclesiarum antistitum series... A pontificatu Pii PP. VII (1800) usque ad pontificatum Gregorii PP. XVI (1846) (in Latin). Vol. VII. Monasterii: Libr. Regensburgiana.
- Remigius Ritzler; Pirminus Sefrin (1978). Hierarchia catholica Medii et recentioris aevi... A Pontificatu PII PP. IX (1846) usque ad Pontificatum Leonis PP. XIII (1903) (in Latin). Vol. VIII. Il Messaggero di S. Antonio.
- Pięta, Zenon (2002). Hierarchia catholica medii et recentioris aevi... A pontificatu Pii PP. X (1903) usque ad pontificatum Benedictii PP. XV (1922) (in Latin). Vol. IX. Padua: Messagero di San Antonio. ISBN 978-88-250-1000-8.

=== Studies ===
- Cappelletti, Giuseppe (1870). Le chiese d'Italia dalla loro origine sino ai nostri giorni (in Italian). Vol. Tomo vigesimo primo (21). Venezia: G. Antonelli. pp. 318–322.
- Cataldi, Nicola (1848), "Ugento", in: Vincenzo D'Avino (1848). Cenni storici sulle chiese arcivescovili, vescovili, e prelatizie (nulluis) del Regno delle Due Sicilie (in Italian). Napoli: dalle stampe di Ranucci. pp. 728–734.
- Kamp, Norbert (1975). Kirche und Monarchie im staufischen Königreich Sizilien. I. Prosopographische Grundlegung: 2. Apulien und Kalabrien. München: Wilhelm Fink Verlag. (in German)
- Kehr, Paul Fridolin (1962). Italia pontificia. Vol. IX: Samnium — Apulia — Lucania. Berlin: Weidmann. (in Latin)
- Palese, Salvatore (1974). "Sinodi diocesani e visite pastorali della diocesi di Alessano e di Ugento, dal concilio di Trento al concordato del 1818", in: Archivio storico pugliese 27 (1974), pp. 453–499. (in Italian)
- Ughelli, Ferdinando; Coleti, Niccolò (1721). Italia sacra sive De episcopis Italiæ, et insularum adjacentium (in Latin). Vol. Tomus nonus (9). Venice: apud Sebastianum Coleti. pp. 110–114.
