= Cripta del Crocifisso, Ugento =

Underground place of worship in Italy

Cripta del Crocifisso di Ugento
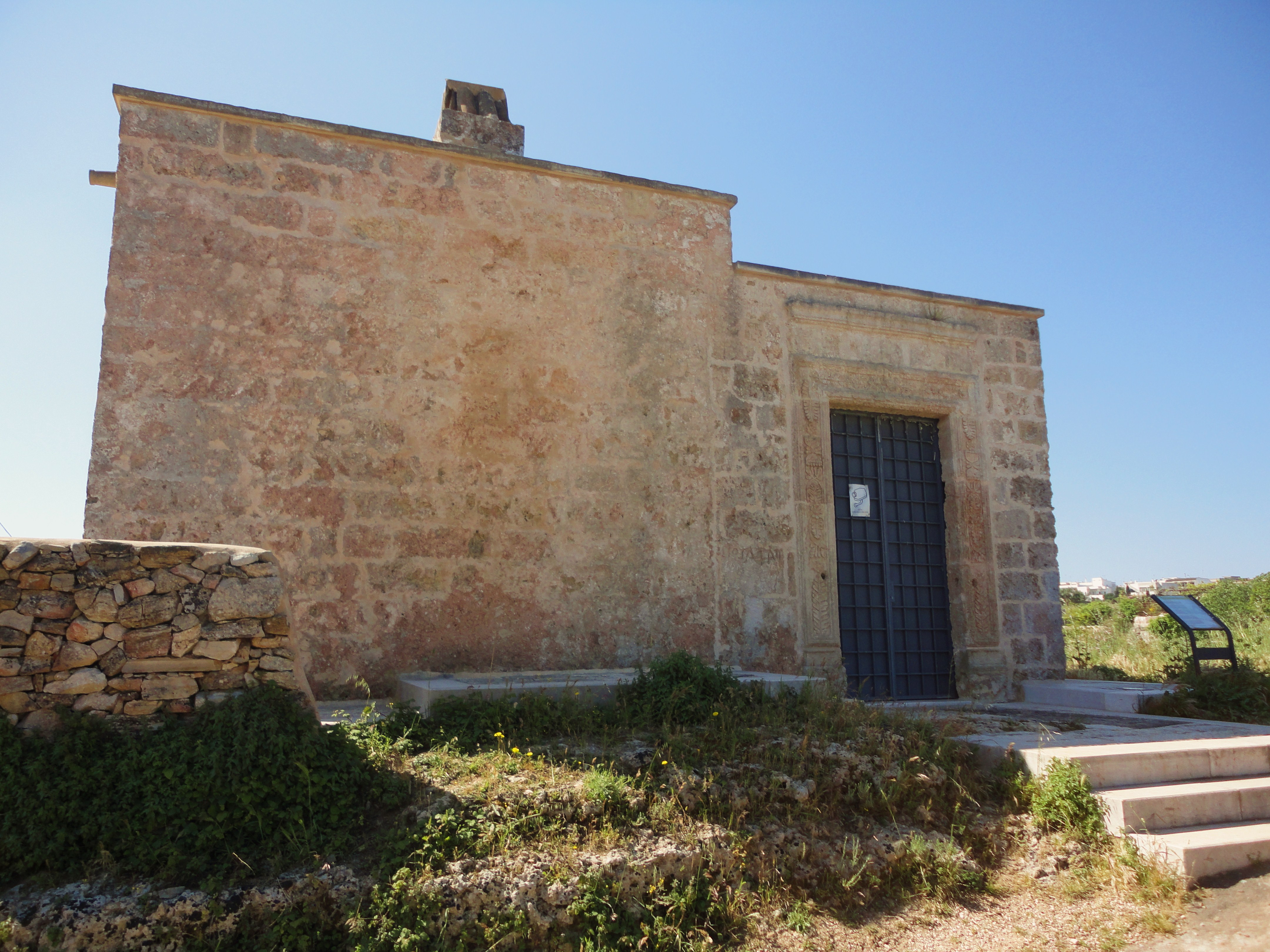
- Click on the map for a fullscreen view
- 39°56′21″N 18°09′35″E
- Location: Strada Provinciale 206, Ugento
- Country: Italy
- Denomination: Catholic

History
- Status: Titular church

The crypt of the Crucifix is an underground place of worship located in the municipality of Ugento, in the province of Lecce.

== History ==
The crypt was used over the centuries as a place of worship in the context of the small rock village that surrounds it. The area on which it develops is of considerable archaeological interest and records human presence at least from the 4th century BC. It is located on the so-called Via Sallentina, a Messapian and Roman path that connected Otranto to Taranto, crossing Castra Minervae, Veretum, Uzintum, Baletium, Neretum and Manduris, whose route can be seen from the ancient Tabula Peutingeriana.

== Architecture ==
The crypt, entirely dug out of the tuffaceous rock, is the result of changes and additions in the plan and architecture, as demonstrated by the two 16th century circular columns with Doric capital, the addition of an altar on the eastern wall, surmounted by a fresco century depicting the Crucifixion (hence the name of the crypt), a skylight created later and the occlusion of the original entrance to the west. It is accessed through a door to the north, followed by a barrel-vaulted staircase that leads to the underground room. The entrance is enriched by a frescoed lunette with the scene of the Holy Family.

Inside, the walls and ceiling are covered with frescoes dating from the 13th and 17th century, accompanied by inscriptions in Greek and Latin. The oldest pictorial cycle (13th century) includes an Annunciation, a Christ Pantocrator, a Virgin of Tenderness, an Enthroned Madonna and a Saint Nicholas from the beginning of the 14th century. Crusader shields are painted on the ceiling where shields with a black cross inside, symbol of the Teutonic knights, alternate with shields with a red cross inside, symbol of the Knights Templar. In fact, in the ancient popular tradition of Ugento, the crypt was called "Dei Crocifissi". Also on the ceiling are frescoed stars, plant motifs and real and fantastic animals, such as the great Idra, a figure from Greek mythology.

== Bibliography ==
- C.D. Fonseca, Gli insediamenti rupestri medievali nel Basso Salento, Galatina 1979, p. 217.
- Luciano Antonazzo, Guida di Ugento. Storia e arte di una città millenaria, Congedo, 2005.
- Luciano Antonazzo, Ugento sacra, ovvero antiche chiese - ex conventi e monasteri - edifici ecclesiastici e monumenti sacri della città di Ugento e della sua frazione Gemini, Foggia : Claudio Grenzi, 2020, 978-88-8431-790-2
- Antonio Lupo, La cripta del Crocefisso a Ugento, Lecce : Leucasia, 2004, 31 p.
- La Cripta del Crocefisso ad Ugento : la storia, gli studi, le nuove acquisizioni, Marina Falla Castelfranchi, Lucia Piccinno, Antonio Saturnino; a cura di Maria Consiglia De Matteis, Ugento : Citta di Ugento, Assessorato alla cultura; Associazione Pro-Loco Ugento e Marine, 2006, 55 p.
