= Lucas de Franchis =

Italian Roman Catholic prelate

Most Reverend Lucas de Franchis
- Bishop of Ugento
- Church: Catholic Church
- Diocese: Diocese of Ugento
- In office: 1614–1615
- Predecessor: Pedro Guerrero
- Successor: Juan Bravo Lagunas

Personal details
- Born: 1575 Naples, Italy
- Died: 1615 (age 40) Ugento, Italy

Lucas de Franchis (1575 – 1615) was a Roman Catholic prelate who served as Bishop of Ugento (1614–1615).

== Biography ==
Lucas de Franchis was born in Naples, Italy. On 27 January 1614, he was appointed by Pope Paul V as Bishop of Ugento. He served as Bishop of Ugento until his death in 1615.

== External links and additional sources ==
- Cheney, David M. "Diocese of Ugento–Santa Maria di Leuca". Catholic-Hierarchy.org. (for Chronology of Bishops) ^{[self-published]}
- Chow, Gabriel. "Diocese of Ugento–Santa Maria di Leuca (Italy)". GCatholic.org. (for Chronology of Bishops) ^{[self-published]}

Catholic Church titles
Preceded by Pedro Guerrero (bishop)	Bishop of Ugento; 1614–1615	Succeeded by Juan Bravo Lagunas
