= Lorenzo Díaz de Encinas =

Most Reverend Lorenzo Díaz de Encinas
- Bishop of Ugento
- Church: Catholic Church
- Diocese: Diocese of Ugento
- In office: 1659–1660
- Predecessor: Andreas Lanfranchi
- Successor: Antonio Carafa

Orders
- Consecration: 17 August 1659 by Marcantonio Franciotti

Personal details
- Born: March 1599 Toledo, Spain
- Died: 23 November 1660 (age 61) Ugento, Italy

Lorenzo Díaz de Encinas, O. Carm. (1599–1660) was a Roman Catholic prelate who served as Bishop of Ugento (1659–1660).

== Biography ==
Lorenzo Díaz de Encinas was born in Toledo, Spain in 1599 and ordained a priest in the Order of the Brothers of the Blessed Virgin Mary of Mount Carmel. On 18 November 1657, he was selected as Bishop of Ugento and confirmed by Pope Alexander VII on 28 July 1659. On 17 August 1659, he was consecrated bishop by Marcantonio Franciotti, Cardinal-Priest of Santa Maria della Pace, with Stefano Quaranta, Archbishop of Amalfi, and Francisco Suárez de Villegas, Titular Bishop of Memphis, serving as co-consecrators. He served as Bishop of Ugento until his death on 23 November 1660.

== External links and additional sources ==
- Cheney, David M. "Diocese of Ugento–Santa Maria di Leuca". Catholic-Hierarchy.org. (for Chronology of Bishops) ^{[self-published]}
- Chow, Gabriel. "Diocese of Ugento–Santa Maria di Leuca (Italy)". GCatholic.org. (for Chronology of Bishops) ^{[self-published]}

Catholic Church titles
Preceded by Andreas Lanfranchi	Bishop of Ugento; 1659–1660	Succeeded by Antonio Carafa
