= Torre San Giovanni di Ugento Lighthouse =

Torre San Giovanni di Ugento
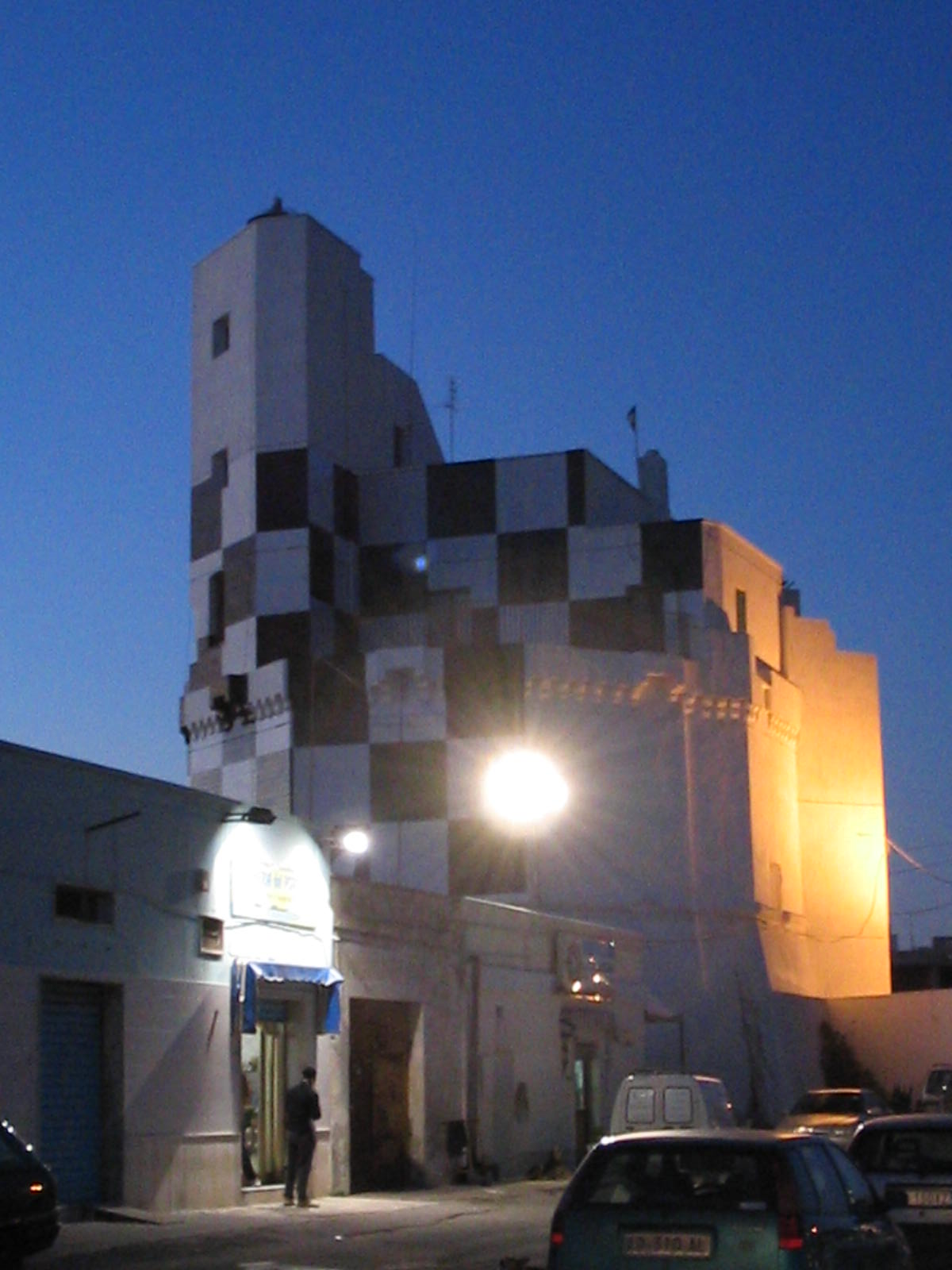
- Torre San Giovanni Lighthouse
- Location: Ugento; Apulia; Italy
- Coordinates: 39°53′11″N 18°06′50″E

Tower
- Constructed: 1565
- Construction: stone tower
- Height: 22 metres (72 ft)
- Shape: triangular prism tower with lantern atop fortified watch tower
- Markings: black and white checker board pattern, grey lantern
- Power source: mains electricity
- Operator: Marina Militare

Light
- First lit: 1932
- Focal height: 24 metres (79 ft)
- Lens: type TD
- Intensity: AL 1000 W
- Range: main: 15 nautical miles (28 km; 17 mi) reserve: 11 nautical miles (20 km; 13 mi)
- Characteristic: Iso WR 4s.
- Italy no.: 3584 E.F.

Torre San Giovanni di Ugento Lighthouse (Italian: Faro di Torre di San Giovanni di Ugento) is an active lighthouse located in Torre San Giovanni, in front of the Marina, on the south-western coast of the Salento Peninsula, on the Ionian Sea.

== Description ==
The lighthouse was activated in 1932 and consists of a lantern mounted atop an octagonal tower, 22 metres (72 ft) high, dedicated to San Giovanni, built in 1565 by Charles V. The front of the massive tower is painted in a bold black and white checkerboard pattern. The lantern, painted in grey metallic, is positioned at 24 metres (79 ft) above sea level and emits white or red isophase flash in a 4 seconds period, visible up to a distance of 15 nautical miles (28 km; 17 mi). The lighthouse is completely automated and is managed by the Marina Militare with the identification code number 3310 E.F.

== See also ==
- List of lighthouses in Italy
- Torre San Giovanni
