= Pedro Guerrero (bishop) =

Most Reverend Pedro Guerrero
- Bishop of Ugento
- Church: Catholic Church
- Diocese: Diocese of Ugento
- In office: 1599–1613
- Predecessor: Giuseppe de Rossi
- Successor: Lucas de Franchis

Personal details
- Died: 1613 Ugento, Italy

Pedro Guerrero (died 1613) was a Roman Catholic prelate who served as Bishop of Ugento (1599–1613).

On 15 December 1599, he was appointed by Pope Paul V as Bishop of Ugento. He served as Bishop of Ugento until his death in 1613.

== External links and additional sources ==
- Cheney, David M. "Diocese of Ugento–Santa Maria di Leuca". Catholic-Hierarchy.org. (for Chronology of Bishops) ^{[self-published]}
- Chow, Gabriel. "Diocese of Ugento–Santa Maria di Leuca (Italy)". GCatholic.org. (for Chronology of Bishops) ^{[self-published]}

Catholic Church titles
Preceded by Giuseppe de Rossi (archbishop)	Bishop of Ugento; 1599–1613	Succeeded by Lucas de Franchis
