= Antonio Carafa (bishop of Ugento) =

Most Reverend Antonio Carafa
- Bishop of Ugento
- Church: Catholic Church
- Diocese: Diocese of Ugento
- In office: 1663–1704
- Predecessor: Lorenzo Díaz de Encinas
- Successor: Pedro Lázaro y Terrer

Orders
- Consecration: 18 February 1663 by Giulio Cesare Sacchetti

Personal details
- Died: 9 May 1704 Ugento, Italy

Antonio Carafa, C.R. (died 1704) was a Roman Catholic prelate who served as Bishop of Ugento (1663–1704).

== Biography ==
Antonio Carafa was ordained a priest in the Congregation of Clerics Regular of the Divine Providence. On 24 May 1662, he was selected as Bishop of Ugento and confirmed by Pope Alexander VII on 12 February 1663. On 18 February 1663, he was consecrated bishop by Giulio Cesare Sacchetti, Cardinal-Bishop of Sabina. He served as Bishop of Ugento until his death on 9 May 1704.

== External links and additional sources ==
- Cheney, David M. "Diocese of Ugento–Santa Maria di Leuca". Catholic-Hierarchy.org. (for Chronology of Bishops) ^{[self-published]}
- Chow, Gabriel. "Diocese of Ugento–Santa Maria di Leuca (Italy)". GCatholic.org. (for Chronology of Bishops) ^{[self-published]}

Catholic Church titles
Preceded by Lorenzo Díaz de Encinas	Bishop of Ugento; 1663–1704	Succeeded by Pedro Lázaro y Terrer
