= Agostinho Barbosa =

Roman Catholic bishop

Most Reverend Agostinho Barbosa
- Bishop of Ugento
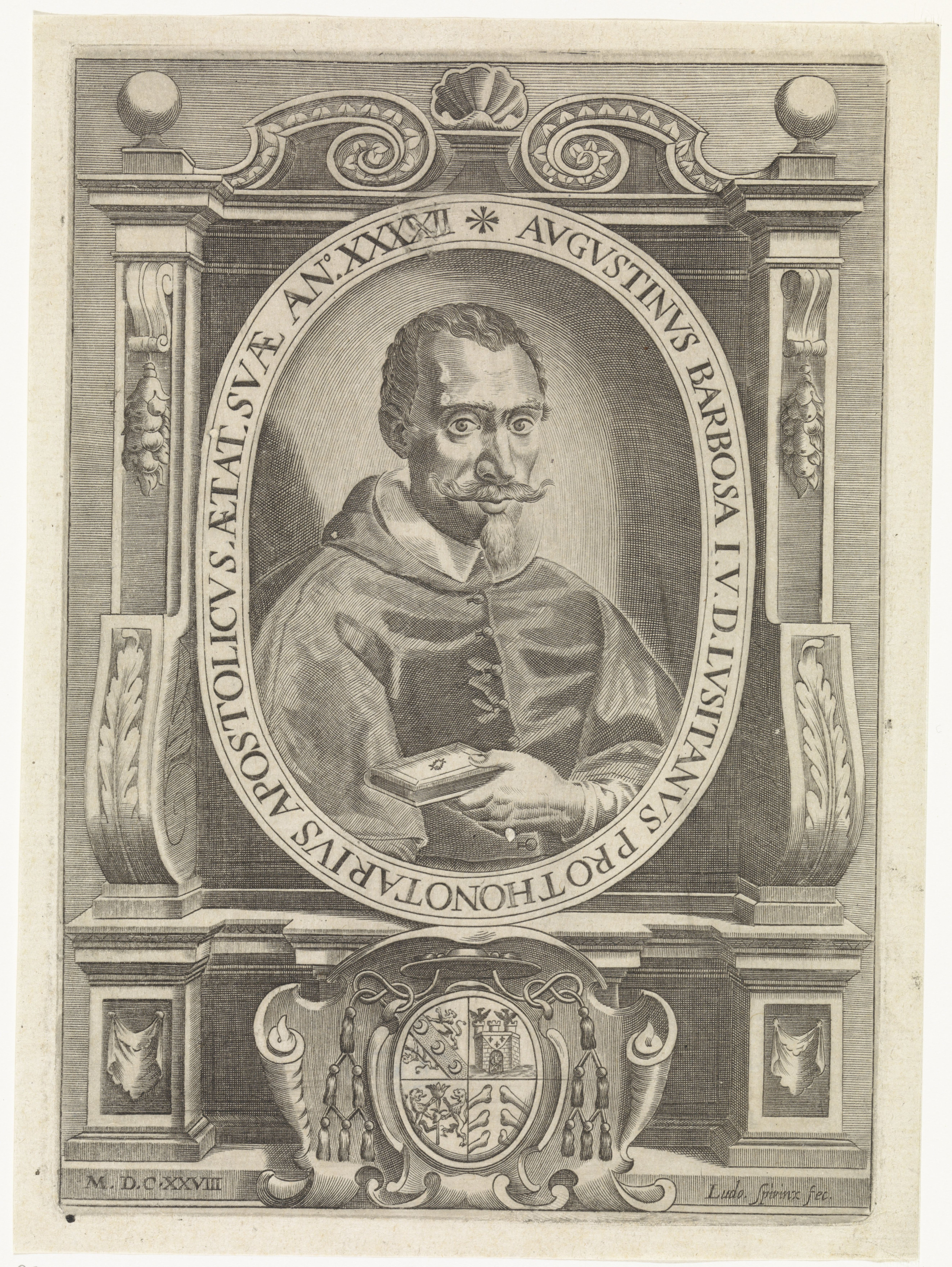
- Agostinho Barbosa in a 1622 engraving.
- Church: Catholic Church
- Diocese: Diocese of Ugento
- In office: 1648–1649
- Predecessor: Girolamo Martini
- Successor: Andreas Lanfranchi

Orders
- Ordination: 19 September 1615
- Consecration: 5 April 1649 by Alfonso de la Cueva, 1st Marquis of Bedmar

Personal details
- Born: September 17, 1590 Aldão, Guimarães, Portugal
- Died: 19 November 1649 (aged 60) Ugento, Italy
- Education: University of Coimbra

Agostinho Barbosa (Agostino, Augustinus) (17 September 1590, at Aldão, Guimarães, Portugal – 19 Nov. 1649, in Ugento, Italy) was a prolific Portuguese writer on canon law. His works included dictionary-type surveys of the legal elements.

== Life ==
Having studied canon law in Portugal, he went to Rome. Being without the means to purchase books, he memorized their contents in libraries. About 1632 he went to Madrid, where he applied himself to writing and fulfilled various duties confided to him until 1648. He was confirmed Bishop of Ugento in Rome on 22 March 1649 and ordained on 5 Apr. 1649.

== Works ==
His works fill at least 30 volumes. They show intimate acquaintance with authors, sources, and controversial questions such as the following:

- Pastoralis Sollicitudinis, sive de Officio et Potestate Episcopi Tripartita Descriptio (Rome, 1621; Lyons, 1629; in folio, 1641, 1650, etc.).
- Variae Juris Tractationes, a similar work relating to parish priests was published in Rome in 1632, Lyons, 1634, Geneva, 1662, Venice, 1705, in quarto; in folio, Lyons, 1631 and 1644, Strasburg, 1652.
- Juris Ecclesiastici Universi Libri III (Lyons, 1633, 1645, 1718).

All the canonical works of Barbosa were published at Lyons, 1657–75, in 19 vols. in quarto, 16 vols. in folio, and again, 1698–1716, 20 vols. in quarto, 18 vols. in folio.

== External links and additional sources ==
- Besta, Enrico (1930). "BARBOSA, Agostino". Enciclopedia Italiana. Rome: Istituto dell'Enciclopedia Italiana.
- Cheney, David M. "Diocese of Ugento–Santa Maria di Leuca". Catholic-Hierarchy.org. (for Chronology of Bishops) ^{[self-published]}
- Chow, Gabriel. "Diocese of Ugento–Santa Maria di Leuca (Italy)". GCatholic.org. (for Chronology of Bishops) ^{[self-published]}
- Tarlton Law Library page

Catholic Church titles
Preceded by Girolamo Martini	Bishop of Ugento; 1649	Succeeded by Andreas Lanfranchi
