= 1559 in poetry =

Nationality words link to articles with information on the nation's poetry or literature (for instance, Irish or France).

== Events ==
- The Catholic Church creates the first Index Librorum Prohibitorum, ("Index of Prohibited Books"). Included on the list is Pier Angelo Manzolli's Zodiacus Vitae a poem first published probably in the early 1530s.

== Works published ==
- Joachim du Bellay, Discours au Roi et Le Poète courtisan satire, France
- Antonio Minturno, De poeta ("On Poetry"), Italian criticism (generally thought to be a source of Sir Philip Sidney's Defense of Poesie 1595)
- Jorge de Montemayor, La Diana, pastoral romance, Portuguese
- Marguerite de Navarre, Heptaméron, poems and stories in the manner of Boccaccio's Decameron; posthumously published, France
- Olivier de Magny, Les Odes d'Olivier de Magny, de Cahors en Quercy, A. Wechel

== Births ==
Death years link to the corresponding "[year] in poetry" article:

- December – Lupercio Leonardo de Argensola (died 1613), Spanish poet, playwright and chronicler, brother of poet Bartolome Leonardo de Argensola
- George Chapman (died 1634), English dramatist, translator, and poet

== Deaths ==
Birth years link to the corresponding "[year] in poetry" article:

- Nicolas Denisot (born 1515), French Renaissance poet and painter
- Yang Shen (born 1488), Chinese poet
- Wen Zhengming (born 1470), Chinese poet, painter and calligrapher

== See also ==
- Poetry
- 16th century in poetry
- 16th century in literature
- Dutch Renaissance and Golden Age literature
- Elizabethan literature
- French Renaissance literature
- Renaissance literature
- Spanish Renaissance literature
