= Palazzo Rovito =

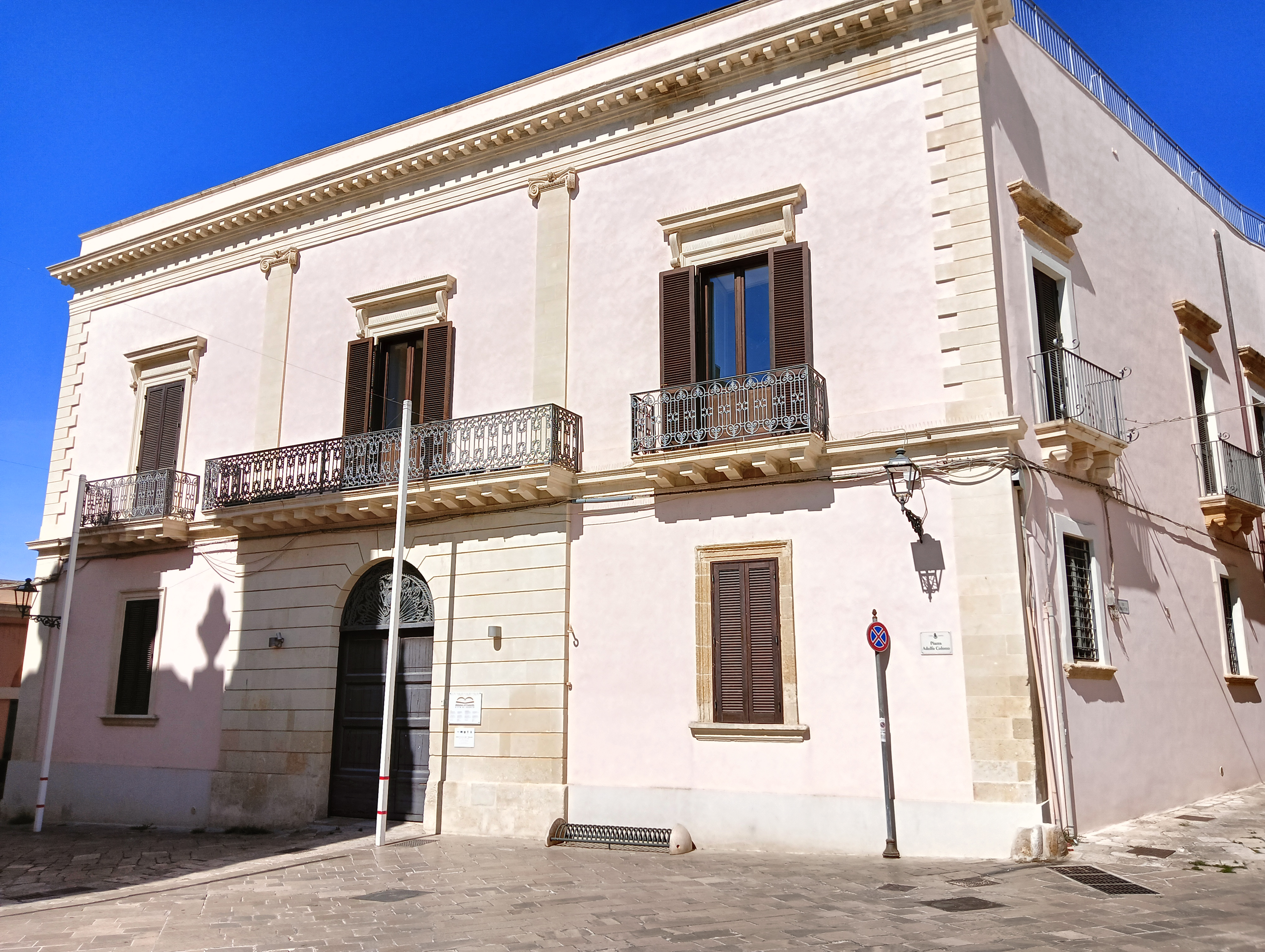
- Palazzo Rovito facade
- Interactive map of the Palazzo Rovito area

General information
- Location: Ugento, Italy
- Coordinates: 39°55′39″N 18°09′42″E

Palazzo Rovito is an historic palace, located in Ugento in the province of Lecce, Italy. It is home to the community library.

== History ==
The building was constructed over the remains of previous buildings. The original part of the palace, with a seventeenth-century layout, was rebuilt on part of the Palazzo di Raimondello Orsini del Balzo. The del Balzo palace was built between the late 1300s and the early 1400s, and was largely destroyed during the Turkish invasion of 1537. In the second half of the 19th century, this property of the Rovito family was enlarged, and it retains this layout.

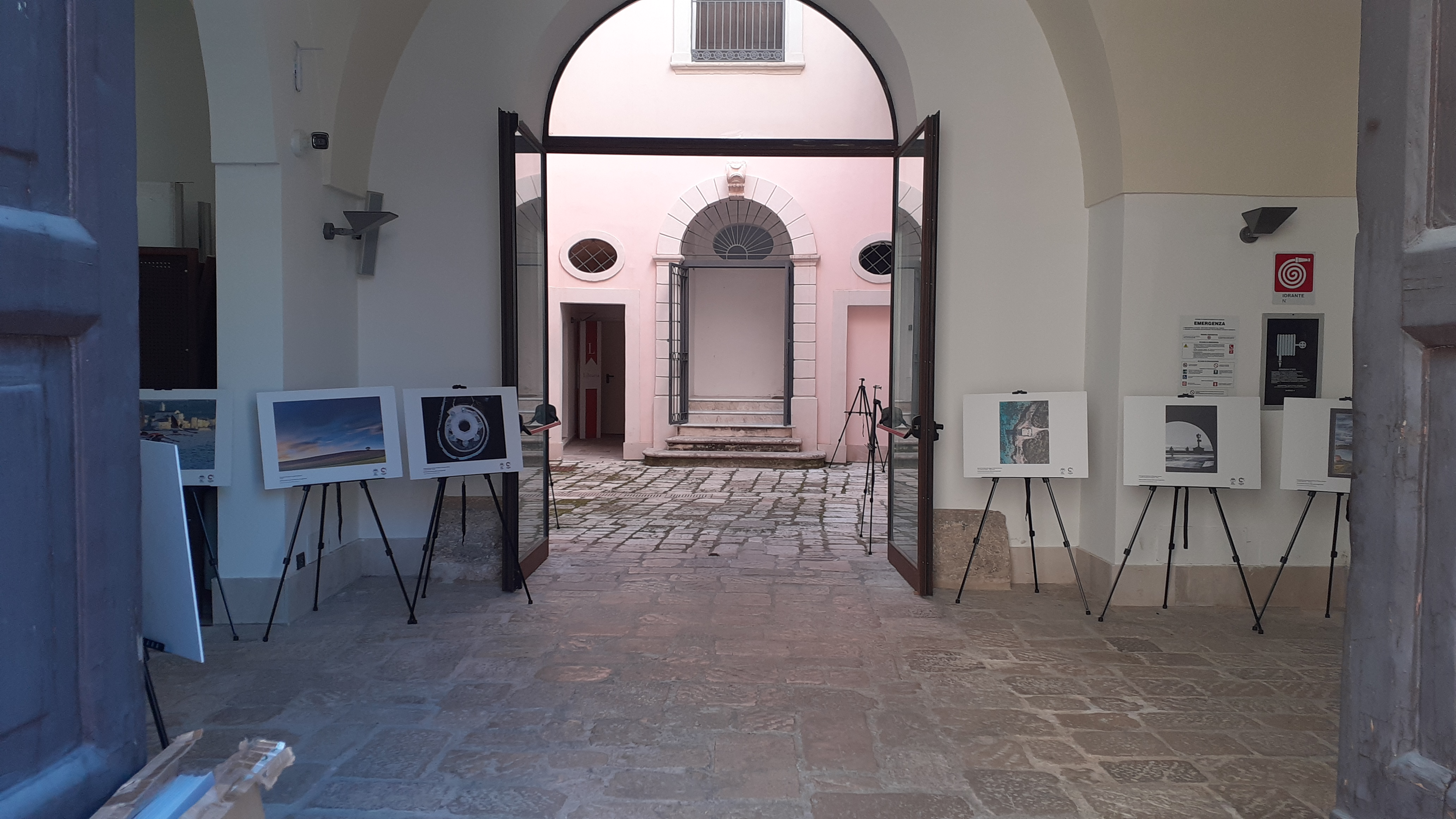
The building's interior in 2023

Palazzo Rovito in 2023 became the site of the new layout of the Community Library of Ugento.

== Design ==
The palazzo is organised around a central square cloister. The main facade is constructed from local Lecce stone. It is divided into three parts by corner frames connected to the plinth of the base and by two pilasters on the first floor. The facade is further divided into two levels, distinguished by a stringcourse band in relief on which both the main and side balconies protrude as a corbel. The palazzo is crowned by a cornice in the same Lecce stone, shaped in harmony with the perspective and construction rules of Baroque architecture.

The facade facing Via Roma is characterized by structural bodies related to each other by an open space on the first floor, which internally overlooks the quadrangular cloister.

The upper finishes of the palace are characterized by the repetition of Lecce stone frames and appear homogeneous. The ground floor has closing elements that testify to the different moments of intervention. The elevation on via Benedettine reflects a greater constructive unity. The entrance has a covered space with a barrel vault, communicating with the open cloister overlooked by various service areas. The development on two levels has been present since the origin of the building. It is organized according to construction phases: a terraced floor is characterized by varied roofing quotas for the various rooms. Stuccoes and frescoed ceilings decorate the rooms.
