= Andreas Lanfranchi =

Most Reverend Andreas Lanfranchi
- Bishop of Ugento
- Church: Catholic Church
- Diocese: Diocese of Ugento
- In office: 1650–1659
- Predecessor: Agostino Barbosa
- Successor: Lorenzo Díaz de Encinas

Orders
- Consecration: 8 January 1651 by Francesco Peretti di Montalto

Personal details
- Died: 1659 Ugento, Italy

Andreas Lanfranchi (died 1659) was a Roman Catholic prelate who served as Bishop of Ugento (1650–1659).

== Biography ==
Andreas Lanfranchi was ordained a priest in the Congregation of Clerics Regular of the Divine Providence. On 19 December 1650, he was appointed by Pope Innocent X as Bishop of Ugento. On 8 January 1651, he was consecrated bishop by Francesco Peretti di Montalto, Archbishop of Monreale with Ranuccio Scotti Douglas, Bishop Emeritus of Borgo San Donnino, and Francesco Biglia, Bishop of Pavia, as co-consecrators. He served as Bishop of Ugento until he died in 1659.

== External links and additional sources ==
- Cheney, David M. "Diocese of Ugento–Santa Maria di Leuca". Catholic-Hierarchy.org. (for Chronology of Bishops) ^{[self-published]}
- Chow, Gabriel. "Diocese of Ugento–Santa Maria di Leuca (Italy)". GCatholic.org. (for Chronology of Bishops) ^{[self-published]}

Catholic Church titles
Preceded by Agostino Barbosa	Bishop of Ugento; 1650–1659	Succeeded by Lorenzo Díaz de Encinas
