= Santa Maria di Costantinopoli, Ugento =

church of Santa Maria di Costantinopoli of Ugento
- church of Santa Maria di Costantinopoli of Ugento
- church of Santa Maria di Costantinopoli of Ugento (Italian)
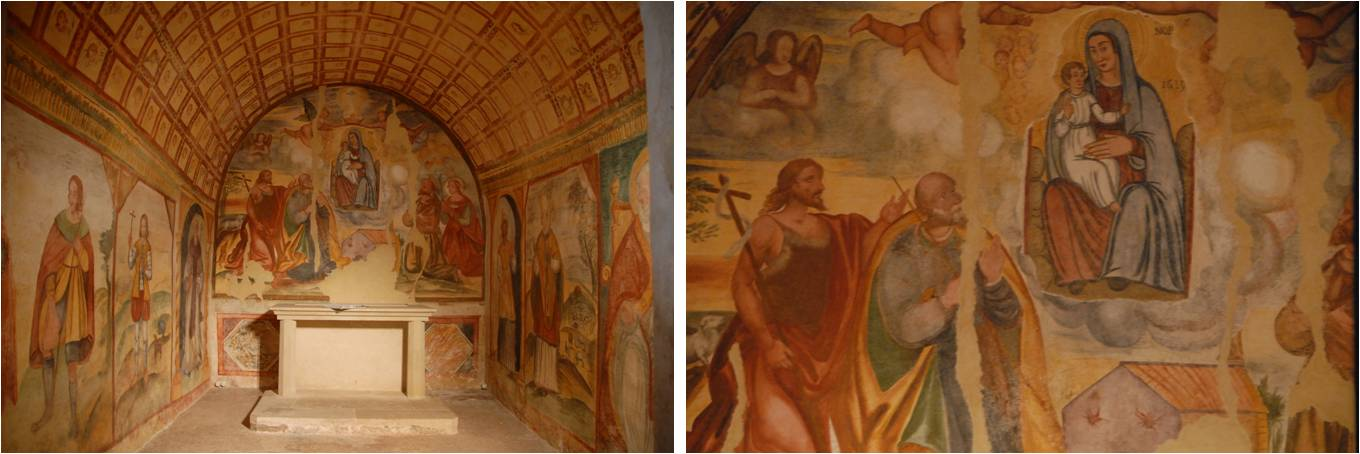
- interior of the church
- church of Santa Maria di Costantinopoli of Ugento
- 39°56′21″N 18°09′36″E
- Location: Ugento, Apulia, Italy
- Denomination: Roman Catholic

The Church of Santa Maria di Costantinopoli is a church located in the municipality of Ugento, in the province of Lecce, Italy.

== History ==
The church, built in the early 17th century, is incorporated into the 18th-century structure of Masseria Crocefissi and stands on the ancient Via Traiana Sallentina, a Roman-era route which over the centuries has become a very popular religious route towards the Sanctuary of Santa Maria di Leuca. Initially the building was completely isolated and was commissioned by the local aristocratic family of the Papadìa.

== Architecture ==
The church, small in size, consists of a single rectangular room with a barrel roof. The external roof was originally gabled, replaced with a flat attic in the 18th century. The interior is entirely frescoed; along the walls there are life-size images of a Prophet (Elijah or Isaiah), of Saint Eligius, Saint Nicholas, Saint Anthony of Padua, Saint Rita, Saint Paul, Saint Biagio, Saint Roch, Saint Vitus and Saint Antonio Abate. On the counter-façade there is a depiction of Christ. Above the altar, of modern workmanship, stands the representation of the Madonna of Constantinople enthroned, with the date of construction (1619). The vault is decorated with false coffers, inside which the faces of winged cherubs are depicted. The Papadìa coat of arms is painted in the center of the vault.
