= Luis Jiménez (bishop) =

Spanish Roman Catholic prelate

Most Reverend Luis Jiménez
- Bishop of Ugento
- Church: Catholic Church
- Diocese: Diocese of Ugento
- In office: 1627–1636
- Predecessor: Juan Bravo Lagunas
- Successor: Girolamo Martini

Orders
- Consecration: 8 September 1627 by Cosimo de Torres

Personal details
- Born: 1586 Cuenca, Spain
- Died: 1636 (aged 49–50) Ugento, Italy

Luis Jiménez (1586–1636) was a Roman Catholic prelate who served as Bishop of Ugento (1627–1636).

== Biography ==
Luis Jiménez was born in Cuenca, Spain and ordained a priest in the Order of the Blessed Virgin Mary of Mercy.

On 3 June 1627, he was selected (nominated) as Bishop of Ugento by King Philip IV of Spain, and, on 30 August 1627, confirmed by Pope Urban VIII. On 8 September 1627, he was consecrated bishop by Cosimo de Torres, Cardinal-Priest of San Pancrazio with Giuseppe Acquaviva, Titular Archbishop of Thebae, and Francesco Nappi (bishop), Bishop of Polignano, as co-consecrators. He served as Bishop of Ugento until his death in 1636.

== External links and additional sources ==
- Cheney, David M. "Diocese of Ugento–Santa Maria di Leuca". Catholic-Hierarchy.org. (for Chronology of Bishops) ^{[self-published]}
- Chow, Gabriel. "Diocese of Ugento–Santa Maria di Leuca (Italy)". GCatholic.org. (for Chronology of Bishops) ^{[self-published]}

Catholic Church titles
Preceded by Juan Bravo Lagunas	Bishop of Ugento; 1627–1636	Succeeded by Girolamo Martini
