= Girolamo Martini =

Most Reverend Girolamo Martini
- Bishop of Ugento
- Church: Catholic Church
- Diocese: Diocese of Ugento
- In office: 1636–1648
- Predecessor: Luis Jiménez (bishop)
- Successor: Agostino Barbosa

Orders
- Ordination: 1613
- Consecration: 26 April 1637 by Luigi Caetani

Personal details
- Born: 1587 Naples, Italy
- Died: 1648 (aged 60–61) Ugento, Italy

Girolamo Martini (1587–1648) was a Roman Catholic prelate who served as Bishop of Ugento (1636–1648).

== Biography ==
Girolamo Martini was born in Naples, Italy and ordained a priest in 1613. On 3 October 1636, he was selected as Bishop of Ugento and confirmed by Pope Urban VIII on 30 March 1637. On 26 April 1637, he was consecrated bishop by Luigi Caetani, Cardinal-Priest of Santa Pudenziana with Alessandro Gallo, Bishop of Massa Lubrense, and Antonio Tornielli, Bishop of Novara, as co-consecrators. He served as Bishop of Ugento until his death in 1648.

== External links and additional sources ==
- Cheney, David M. "Diocese of Ugento–Santa Maria di Leuca". Catholic-Hierarchy.org. (for Chronology of Bishops) ^{[self-published]}
- Chow, Gabriel. "Diocese of Ugento–Santa Maria di Leuca (Italy)". GCatholic.org. (for Chronology of Bishops) ^{[self-published]}

Catholic Church titles
| Preceded by Luis Jiménez (bishop) | Bishop of Ugento; 1636–1648 | Succeeded by Agostino Barbosa |
