= Juan Bravo Lagunas =

Roman Catholic prelate (??–1634)

Most Reverend Juan Bravo Lagunas
- Bishop of Ugento
- Church: Catholic Church
- Diocese: Diocese of Ugento
- In office: 1616–1627
- Predecessor: Lucas de Franchis
- Successor: Luis Jiménez

Orders
- Consecration: 17 January 1616 by Pietro Aldobrandini

Personal details
- Died: 20 November 1634

Juan Bravo Lagunas, O.S.A. (died 20 November 1634), also Juan Bravo de Lagunas, was a Roman Catholic prelate who served as Bishop of Ugento (1616–1627).

== Biography ==
Juan Bravo Lagunas was ordained a priest in the Order of Saint Augustine. On 11 January 1616, he was appointed as Bishop of Ugento by Pope Paul V. On 17 January 1616, he was consecrated bishop by Pietro Aldobrandini, Archbishop of Ravenna with Orazio Mattei, Bishop of Gerace, and Angelo Rocca, Titular Bishop of Thagaste, as co-consecrators. He served as Bishop of Ugento until his resignation in 1627. He died on 20 November 1634.

== Episcopal succession ==
While bishop, he served as the principal consecrator of:

- Gregorio de Alarcón, Bishop of Santiago de Cuba (1624);
- Bernardino de Almansa Carrión, Archbishop of Santo Domingo (1629);

and the principal co-consecrator of:

- Juan de la Torre Ayala, Bishop of Orense (1622);
- Agustín Antolínez, Bishop of Ciudad Rodrigo (1623);
- Melchor Moscoso Sandoval, Bishop of Segovia (1624);
- Gregorio Pedrosa Cásares, Bishop of León (1624);
- Juan Roco Campofrío, Bishop of Zamora (1625);
- Miguel Ayala, Bishop of Palencia (1625);
- Gutiérrez Bernardo de Quirós, Bishop of Tlaxcala (1626);
- Juan Pereda Gudiel, Bishop of Oviedo (1627);
- Cristóbal de la Cámara y Murga, Bishop of Islas Canarias (1628);
- Domingo Pimentel Zúñiga, Bishop of Osma (1631);
- Juan Barahona Zapata del Águila, Bishop of Nicaragua (1632);
- Martín Carrillo Alderete, Bishop of Oviedo (1633);
- Marcos Ramírez de Prado y Ovando, Bishop of Chiapas (1633);
- Antonio Valdés Herrera, Bishop of Mondoñedo (1634); and
- Luis García Rodríguez, Bishop of Orense (1634).

== See also ==
- Catholic Church in Italy

== External links and additional sources ==
- Cheney, David M. "Diocese of Ugento–Santa Maria di Leuca". Catholic-Hierarchy.org. (for Chronology of Bishops) ^{[self-published]}
- Chow, Gabriel. "Diocese of Ugento–Santa Maria di Leuca (Italy)". GCatholic.org. (for Chronology of Bishops) ^{[self-published]}

Catholic Church titles
Preceded by Lucas de Franchis	Bishop of Ugento; 1616–1627	Succeeded by Luis Jiménez (bishop)
