= 1515 in poetry =

This article covers 1515 in poetry. Nationality words link to articles with information on the nation's poetry or literature (for instance, Irish or France).

== Works published ==
- Alexander Barclay, Saint George, translated from Baptista Spagnuoli Mantuanus; Great Britain
- Stephen Hawes, The Comforte of Lovers, publication year uncertain; Great Britain
- John of Capistrano, Capystranus, London

== Births ==
Death years link to the corresponding "[year] in poetry" article:

- March 28 - Teresa of Ávila, mystical Spanish poet and saint
- Roger Ascham, born about this year (died 1568), English scholar, didactic writer and poet; tutor of Queen Elizabeth I
- William Baldwin, born about this year (died 1563), English
- Nicolas Denisot (died 1559), French Renaissance poet and painter
- Brne Karnarutić (died 1573), Croatian Renaissance poet and writer
- Ambrosius Lobwasser (died 1585), German poet and hymnologist
- Louis Des Masures (died 1574), French

== Deaths ==
Birth years link to the corresponding "[year] in poetry" article:

- February 16 - Aldus Manutius (born 1449), Italian printer and Latin-language poet
- Cantalicio (born 1445), Italian, Latin-language poet

== See also ==
- Poetry
- 16th century in poetry
- 16th century in literature
- French Renaissance literature
- Grands Rhétoriqueurs
- Renaissance literature
- Spanish Renaissance literature
