= Vito De Grisantis =

Italian Bishop

- Bishop of Ugento-Santa Maria di Leuca
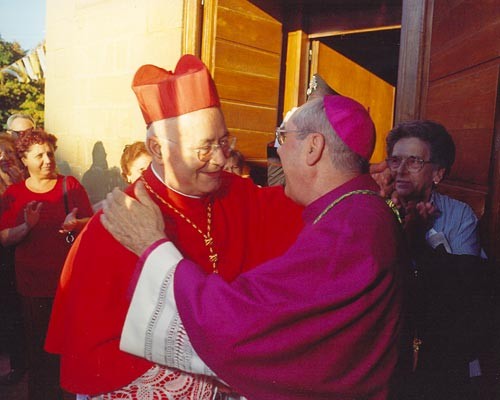
- De Grisantis (right), embracing Cardinal Salvatore De Giorgi (left)
- Church: Catholic Church
- Diocese: Diocese of Ugento-Santa Maria di Leuca
- In office: 13 May 2000 – 1 April 2010
- Predecessor: Domenico Caliandro
- Successor: Vito Angiuli

Orders
- Ordination: 27 June 1965
- Consecration: 26 June 2000 by Salvatore De Giorgi

Personal details
- Born: 20 August 1941 Lecce, Province of Lecce, Kingdom of Italy
- Died: 1 April 2010 (aged 68) Tricase, Apulia, Italy

Vito De Grisantis (20 August 1941 – 1 April 2010) was an Italian Bishop of the Roman Catholic Diocese of Ugento-Santa Maria di Leuca from his appointment by Pope John Paul II on 26 June 2000, until his death on 1 April 2010.

Vito De Grisantis was born in Lecce, Italy.

He died on 1 April 2010, in Tricase, Italy, at the age of 68.
