= Torre San Giovanni =

Torre San Giovanni lighthouse
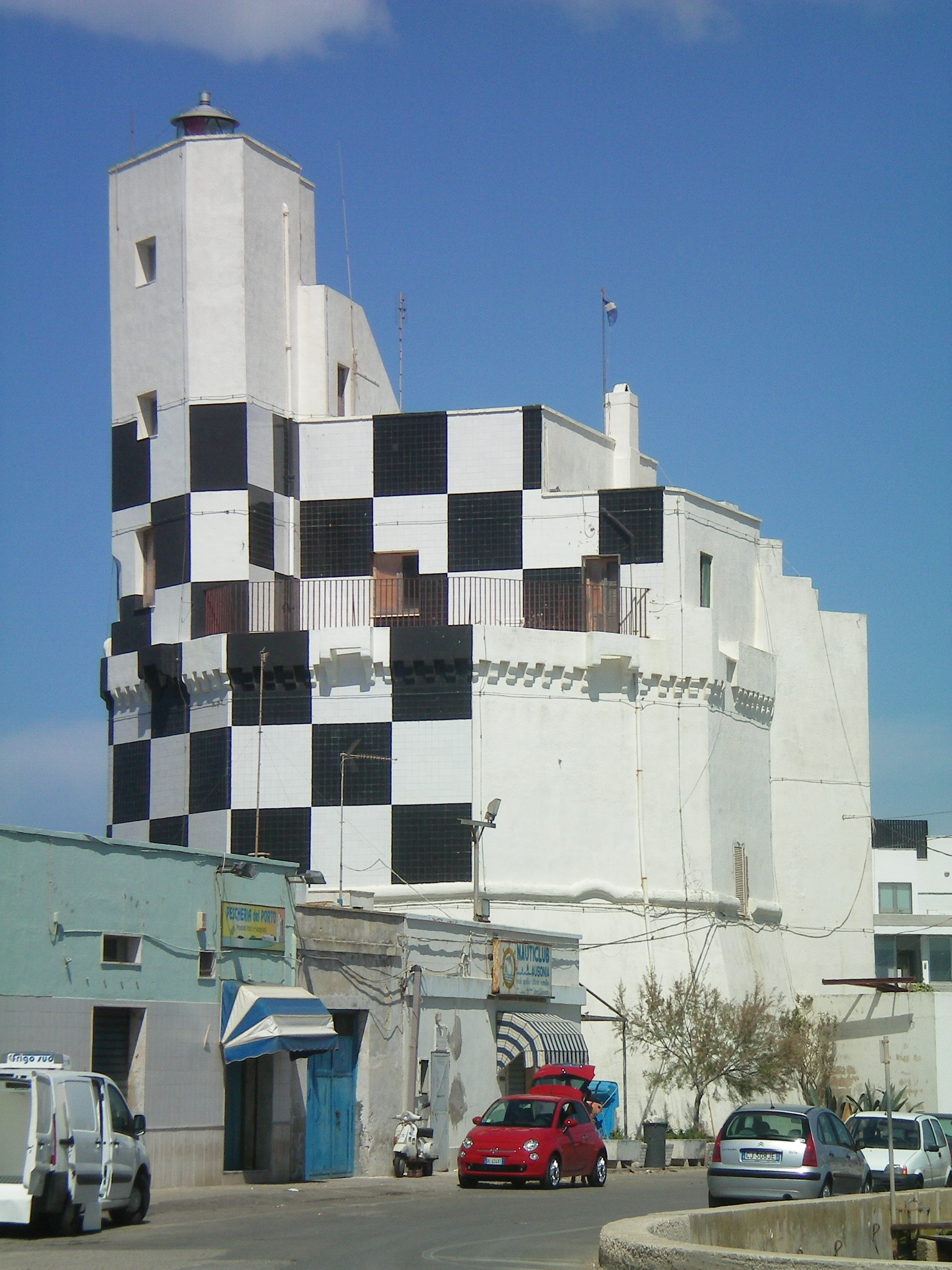
- Location: Ugento, Italy
- Coordinates: 39°53′10″N 18°06′50″E

Tower
- Constructed: 1932
- Height: 22 m (72 ft)
- Power source: mains electricity

Light
- Focal height: 24 m (79 ft)
- Range: 15 nmi (28 km; 17 mi) (white), 11 nmi (20 km; 13 mi) (red)
- Characteristic: Iso WR 4s

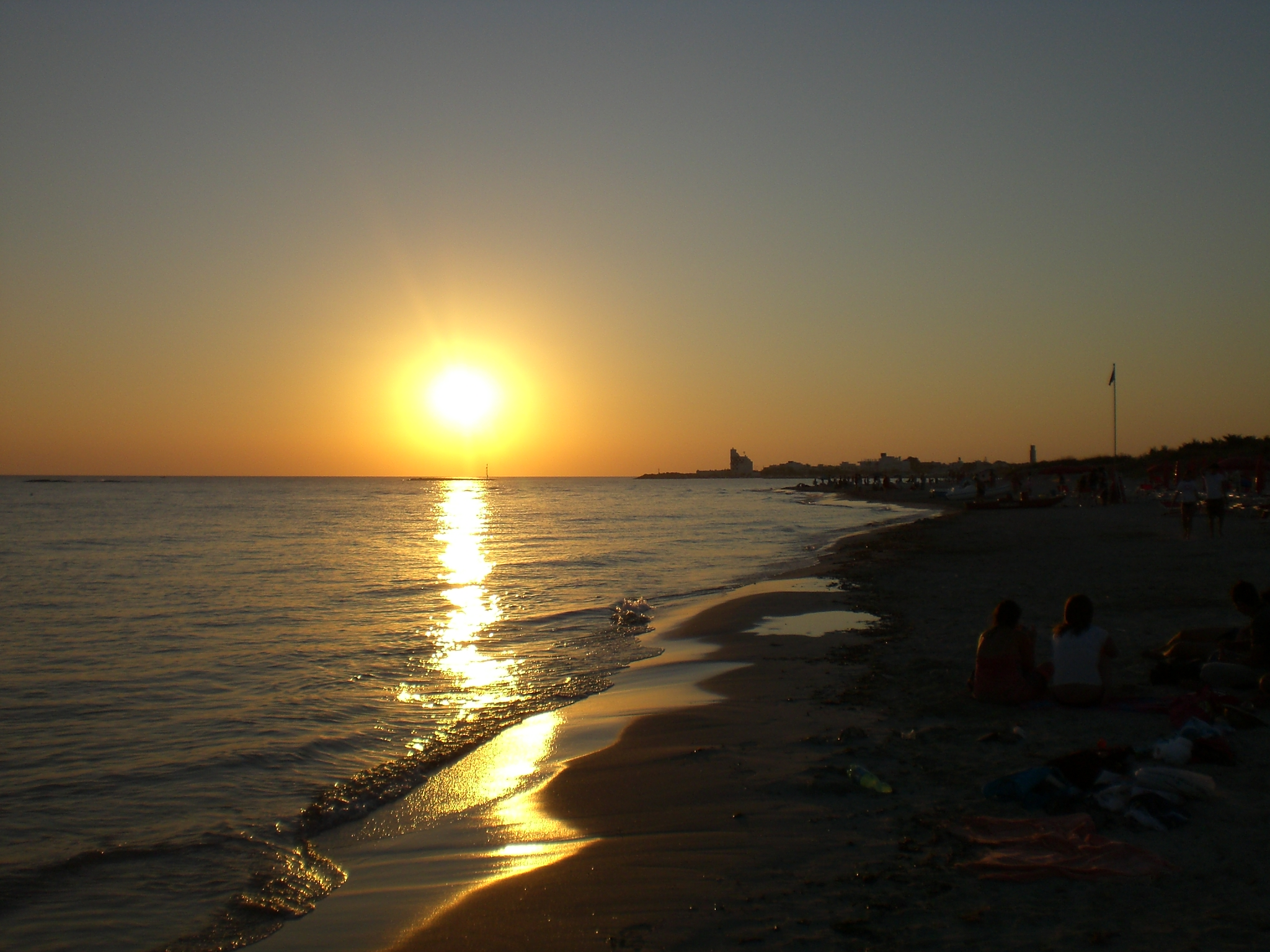
Sunset on Torre San Giovanni sea

Torre San Giovanni is a frazione of the comune of Ugento, in the province of Lecce (Apulia), southern Italy. It is located on the south-western coast of the Salento peninsula, facing the Ionian Sea.

== History ==
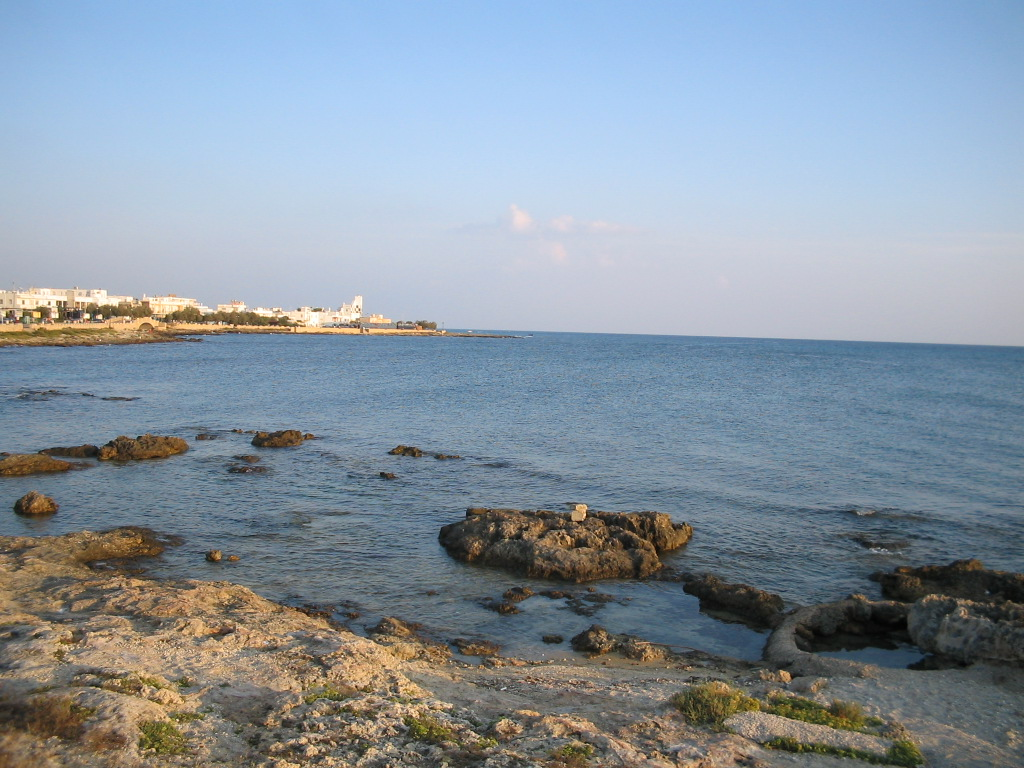
Rock formations by the sea in Torre San Giovanni

In the past it hosted an important Roman harbour and a relevant trade centre, as archeological discoveries testify.

The octagonal tower devoted to San Giovanni was built in 1565 and is located on a tiny peninsula which once surrounded the small port. Inside the tower there is a fresco painted by San Giovanni. On top of the tower there is a lighthouse.

== See also ==
- Ugento
- Torre San Giovanni di Ugento Lighthouse
