= Antonio Minturno =

Italian poet and critic

Antonio Sebastiano Minturno
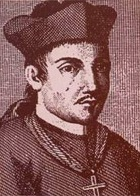
- Antonio Sebastiano Minturno
- Born: 1500; Minturno, Kingdom of Naples
- Died: 1574 (aged 73–74); Crotone, Kingdom of Naples
- Occupations: Poet, critic, and bishop
- Writing career
- Language: Italian
- Period: Late Middle Ages
- Notable works: De Poeta; L'Arte Poetica
- Literary movement: Renaissance

Antonio Sebastiano Minturno (1500–1574) was an Italian poet and critic, and Bishop of Ugento. His influential literary theories were largely Aristotelian. He was born at Minturno, then part of the Kingdom of Naples.

== Biography ==
The name Minturno, by which alone Sebastiano is remembered, is said to have been taken from an old city in the Kingdom of Naples named Minturna, which had existed near Traetto where he was born. He studied philosophy with Agostino Nifo in Naples, and followed him to Sessa and Pisa. In 1521 he went to Rome, where he was protected by the Colonnas. In their castle of Genazzano he learned Greek from a certain maestro Paolo, and made some progress in Hebrew. In order to escape the plague he left Rome in 1523 and returned to Sessa, where he studied mathematics, and thence to Naples. At this time he took up the composition of vernacular verse. The wars caused him to remove to Sicily, where the viceroy Monteleone welcomed him and granted him a pension of 200 ducats. In 1559 Minturno became Bishop of Ugento, and in that capacity attended the Council of Trent. In 1565 he was transferred to the bishopric of Crotone, where he died in 1574.

== Works ==
He wrote three collections of poems in Latin: Carmina (1548), Poemata (1562), and Poemata Tridentina (1564, written during the Council of Trent). He intensely admired the sonnets of Petrarch. In 1559 he wrote the critical work De Poeta, a lengthy dialogue in which he maintains the Aristotelian idea of tragedy as a lesson to the audience on the transience of worldly things, and as a method of spiritual purgation. It is prescriptive in tone and assumes poetry to be essentially imitative. The functions of the tragedian are to delight, to teach and to move: delectare, docere, movere.

The dialogue Minturno, ovvero de la bellezza ("Minturno, or On Beauty", 1592–3) by Torquato Tasso is dedicated to him.

== External links and additional sources ==
- Cheney, David M. "Archdiocese of Crotone-Santa Severina". Catholic-Hierarchy.org. (for Chronology of Bishops) ^{[self-published]}
- Chow, Gabriel. "Archdiocese of Crotone-Santa Severina". GCatholic.org. (for Chronology of Bishops) ^{[self-published]}
- Gibbons, D. (2002). Minturno, Antonio. Oxford University Press. ISBN 978-0-19-818332-7.
- Campbell, G. (2003). Minturno, Antonio. Oxford University Press. ISBN 978-0-19-860175-3.
- Tallini, Gennaro (2018). "SEBASTIANI MINTURNO, Antonio". Dizionario Biografico degli Italiani (in Italian). Vol. 91: Savoia–Semeria. Rome: Istituto dell'Enciclopedia Italiana. ISBN 978-88-12-00032-6.
