= Ugento =

Ugento Griko:Ozan
- Comune
- Comune di Ugento
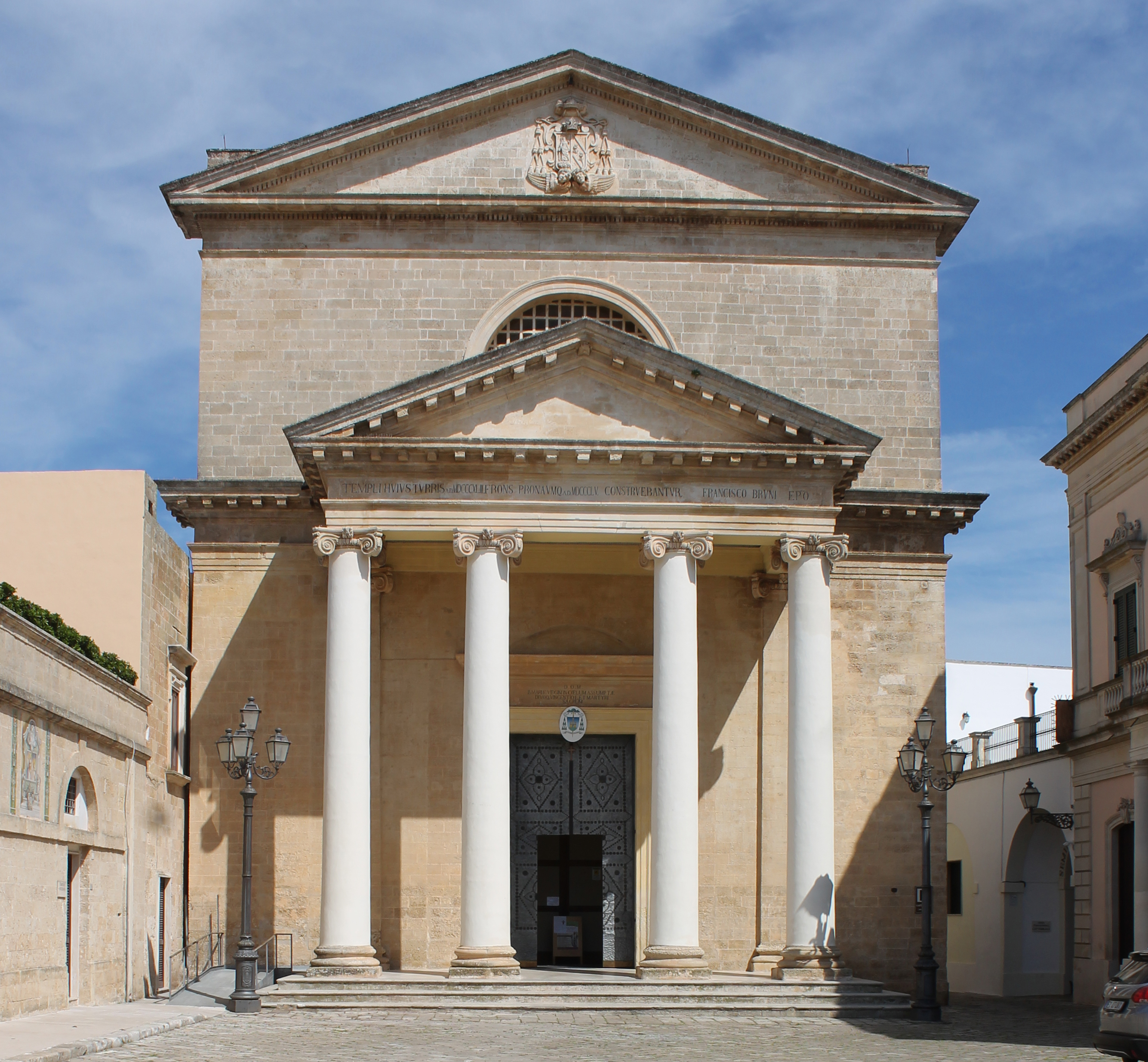
- Ugento cathedral

- Coat of arms

- Location within Italy Location within Apulia
- Coordinates: 39°55′38″N 18°09′41″E
- Country: Italy
- Region: Apulia
- Province: Lecce (LE)
- Frazioni: Gemini, Torre San Giovanni, part of Lido Marini, Torre Mozza

Government
  - Mayor: Massimo Lecci

Area
  - Total: 100.4 km^{2} (38.8 sq mi)
- Elevation: 108 m (354 ft)

Population (31 March 2012)
  - Total: 12,327
  - Density: 122.8/km^{2} (318.0/sq mi)
- Demonym: Ugentini
- Time zone: UTC+1 (CET)
  - Summer (DST): UTC+2 (CEST)
- Postal code: 73059
- Dialing code: 0833
- Patron saint: St Vincent the Martyr
- Saint day: 22 January
- Website: Official website

Ugento (Salentino: Ušèntu) is a town and comune in the province of Lecce, Apulia, southern Italy. It has a small harbour on the Gulf of Taranto of the Ionian Sea.

== History ==
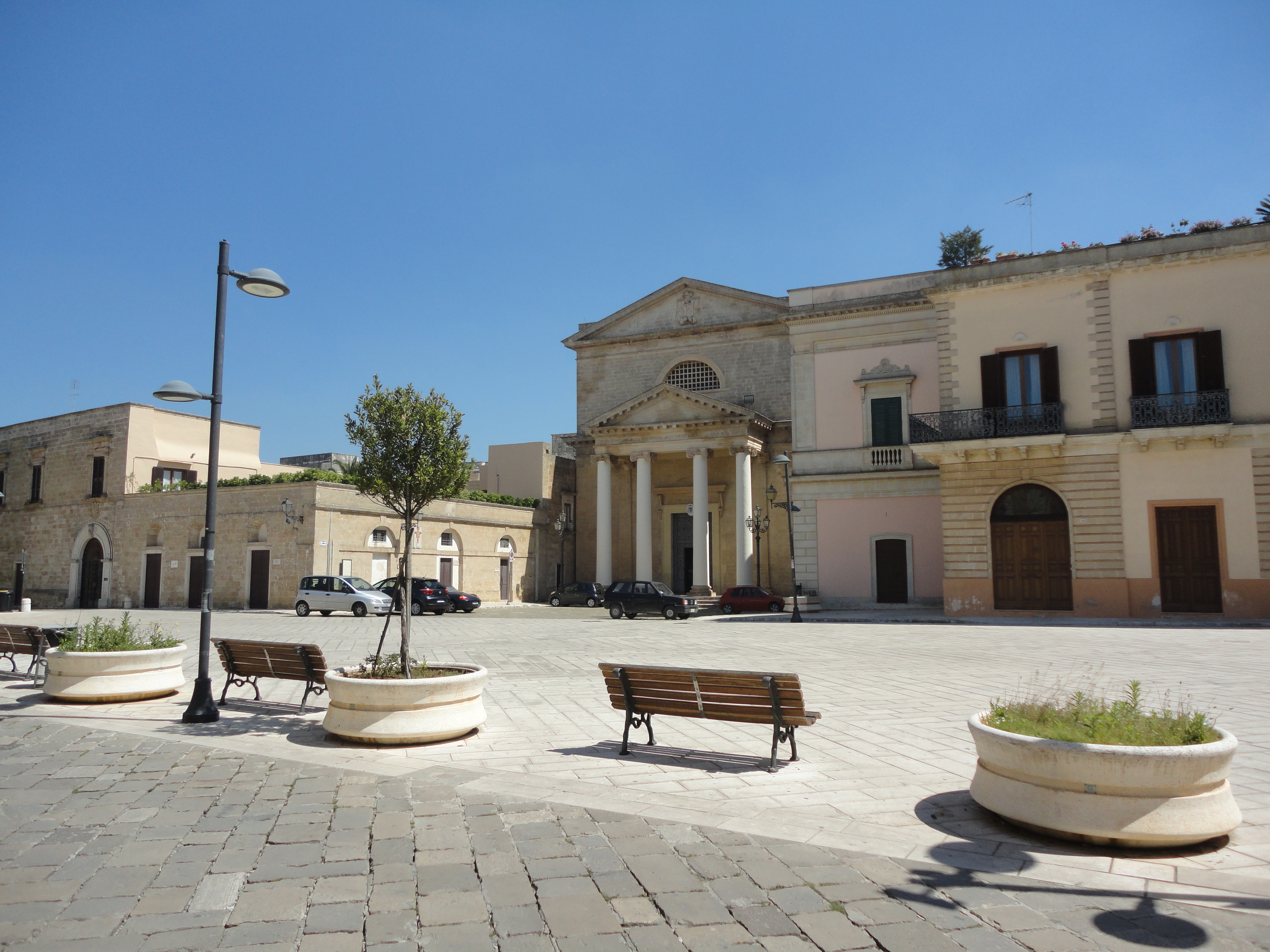
The Piazza di Ugento

The city is the ancient Uxentum, and claims to have been founded by Uxens, who is mentioned in the Eighth Book of the Aeneid. In ancient times it was an important city. In 1537 it was sacked by the Turks. Under Byzantine domination it had Greek bishops.

== Economy ==
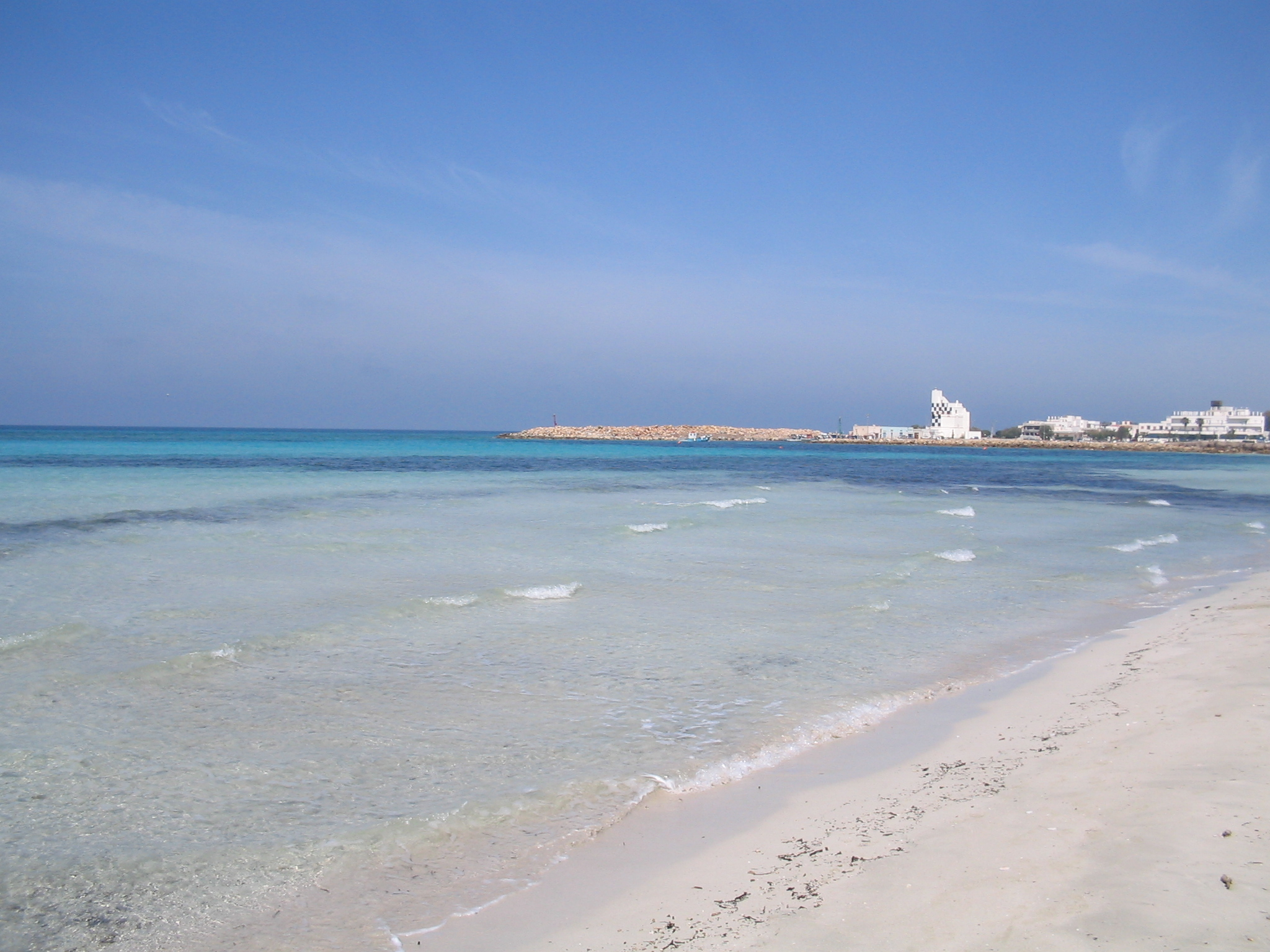
The beach at Torre San Giovanni in Ugento

Economy is mostly based on agriculture (wine and olives), fishing, shepherding, food processing and tourism.
