= 1572 in poetry =

List of years in poetry	(table)
- … 1562; 1563; 1564; 1565; 1566; 1567; 1568; 1569; 1570; 1571; 1572; 1573; 1574; 1575; 1576; 1577; 1578; 1579; 1580; 1581; 1582 …
- In literature 1569 1570 1571 1572 1573 1574 1575
- Art; Archaeology; Architecture; Literature; Music; Philosophy; Science; +...

Nationality words link to articles with information on the nation's poetry or literature (for instance, Irish or France).

== Events ==
- George Whetstone joined an English regiment on active service in the Low Countries, where he met fellow English poets George Gascoigne and Thomas Churchyard.

== Works published ==
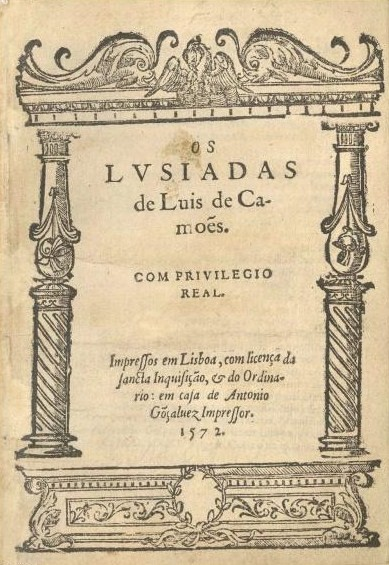
Front of the first edition of Os Lusíadas by Luís de Camões

=== France ===
- Olivier de Magny, Les Amours d'Olivier de Magny et quelques odes de luy, B. Rigaud, Paris, posthumously published France
- Rémy Belleau, Bergerie, mix of prose and verse, including Avril (a revised and expanded edition in which the "seconde journée was added);first edition 1565; France
- Pierre de Ronsard, La Franciade

=== Other ===
- Anonymous Rauf Coilyear, Scottish alliterative poem written in the late 15th century
- Luís de Camões, Os Lusiadas, Portugal
- Johann Fischart, New Eulenspiegel in Rhyme, a rewriting of Eulenspiegel into verse; Germany

== Births ==
Death years link to the corresponding "[year] in poetry" article:

- June 8 – Honorat de Porchères Laugier (died 1653), French poet
- June 11 – Ben Jonson, date not certain (died 1637), English poet and playwright
- January 22 – John Donne (died c. 1631), English poet and Anglican cleric
- December 27 – Johannes Vodnianus Campanus (died 1622), Czech poet and playwright
- Also:
  - Thomas Dekker, birth year not certain (died 1632), English playwright, writer, pamphleteer and poet
  - James Mabbe (died 1642), English poet and translator
  - Nef'i (died 1635), Ottoman poet and satirist
  - Benjamin Rudyerd (died 1658), English politician and poet

== Deaths ==
Birth years link to the corresponding "[year] in poetry" article:

- March 13 – Petar Hektorović (born 1487), Croatian writer, poet and collector
- March 27 – Girolamo Maggi (born 1523), Italian scholar, jurist, poet, military engineer, urban planner, philologist, archaeologist, mathematician and naturalist
- July 25 – Rabbi Isaac Luria (born 1534), Jewish mystic and poet in Palestine
- November 23 – Agnolo di Cosimo, better known as "Il Bronzino" or "Agnolo Bronzino" (born 1503), Italian Mannerist painter and poet
- December 12 – (born unknown), Loredana Marcello, Venetian poet and letter writer
- Giovanni Bona de Boliris (born 1520), Humanist, poet and writer, writing in Latin and Italian

== See also ==
- Poetry
- 16th century in poetry
- 16th century in literature
- Dutch Renaissance and Golden Age literature
- Elizabethan literature
- French Renaissance literature
- Renaissance literature
- Spanish Renaissance literature
