= 1638 in poetry =

List of years in poetry	(table)
- … 1628; 1629; 1630; 1631; 1632; 1633; 1634; 1635; 1636; 1637; 1638; 1639; 1640; 1641; 1642; 1643; 1644; 1645; 1646; 1647; 1648 …
- In literature 1635 1636 1637 1638 1639 1640 1641
- Art; Archaeology; Architecture; Literature; Music; Philosophy; Science; +...

Nationality words link to articles with information on the nation's poetry or literature (for instance, Irish or France).

== Events ==
- May - English poet John Milton sets out for a tour of the European continent. He spends the summer in Florence.

== Works published ==
=== Great Britain ===
- Henry Adamson, Muses Threnodie: of Mirthful Mournings on the death of Mr Gall, Edinburgh, noted for giving a general description of Perth in the 17th century; published with the encouragement of Adamson's friend, William Drummond
- Charles Aleyn, The History of Henry the Seventh
- Richard Brathwaite, writing under the pen name "Corymboeus", Barnabees Journall, under the Names of Mirtilus & Faustulus Shadowed, Latin and English verse on facing pages
- Robert Chamberlain, Nocturnall Lucubrations; or, Meditations Divine and Morall
- William Davenant, Madagascar; with Other Poems
- Justa Edouardo King Naufrago, by various authors; a collection of elegies dedicated to the memory of Edward King, a college friend of John Milton's at Cambridge who had been drowned in August 1637 when his ship sank in the Irish Sea off the coast of Wales; including Milton's "Lycidas"
- Thomas Nabbes, The Springs of Glorie, verse drama
- Francis Quarles, Hieroglyphikes of the Life of Man
- Thomas Randolph, Poems with the Muses Looking-lasse: and Amyntas

=== Other ===
- Friedrich von Logau, Erstes Hundert Teutscher Reimen-Sprüche, epigrams, Germany

== Births ==
Death years link to the corresponding "[year] in poetry" article:

- January 1 – Antoinette du Ligier de la Garde Deshoulières (died 1694), French poet
- January 24 – Charles Sackville, 6th Earl of Dorset (died 1706), English poet and courtier
- February 15 – Zeb-un-Nissa (Makhfi) (died 1702), Persian poet and Mughal princess

== Deaths ==
Birth years link to the corresponding "[year] in poetry" article:

- February 24 – Charles Fitzgeoffrey (born 1576), English poet and clergyman
- February 25 – Sir Robert Aytoun (born 1570), Scottish poet
- June 25 – Juan Pérez de Montalbán (born 1602), Spanish priest, dramatist, poet and novelist
- August 27 – John Hoskins (born 1566), English poet, classicist, judge and politician
- December 8 – Ivan Gundulić (born 1589), Croatian Baroque poet
- c. December? – John Day (born 1574), English playwright and poet
- Daulat Qazi (born 1600), Bengali poet

== See also ==
- Poetry
- 17th century in poetry
- 17th century in literature
