= 1640 in poetry =

| List of years in poetry | (table) |
- … 1630; 1631; 1632; 1633; 1634; 1635; 1636; 1637; 1638; 1639; 1640; 1641; 1642; 1643; 1644; 1645; 1646; 1647; 1648; 1649; 1650 …
- In literature 1637 1638 1639 1640 1641 1642 1643
- Art; Archaeology; Architecture; Literature; Music; Philosophy; Science; +...

Nationality words link to articles with information on the nation's poetry or literature (for instance, Irish or France).

== Events ==
- Early? – Poems written by Wil. Shake-speare, Gent. is published (posthumously) by John Benson in London, the first collection of Shakespeare's non-dramatic poetry, although incomplete and mangled and with some male pronouns changed to female in the sonnets (here reissued for the first time since original publication).
- English Cavalier poet Richard Lovelace, serving in the Bishops' Wars in Scotland, writes "To Lucasta, Going to the Warres" (published 1649)

== Works published ==
- Francis Beaumont, Poems, including a translation from the Latin poetry of Ovid's Metamorphoses, which might not be by Beaumont; several other poems in the book are definitely not by him, according to The Concise Oxford Chronology of English Literature
- Thomas Carew, Poems, including "Coelum Brittanicum" 1634
- Richard Flecknoe, The Affections of a Pious Soule, unto our Savior-Christ, prose and poetry
- Ben Jonson:
  - Art of Poetry, translated from the Latin of Horace; also contains Execration Against Vulcan; The Masque of the Gypsies and Epigrams to Severall Noble Personages in this Kingdome; posthumous edition
  - The Workes of Benjamin Jonson, the second folio; Volume 1 reprints Workes 1616
- Richard Mather and John Eliot, and Thomas Weld The Whole Booke of Psalmes Faithfully Translated into English Metre, commonly known as the Bay Psalm Book, English Colonial American work
- Francis Quarles, Enchyridion
- Nathaniel Richards, The Tragedy of Messallina, the Roman Emperesse
- John Tatham, The Fancies Theater

== Births ==
Death years link to the corresponding "[year] in poetry" article:

- December 14 (probable date) – Aphra Behn, born Eaffrey Johnson (died 1689), English woman playwright and poet
- Nozawa Bonchō 野沢 凡兆 (died 1714), Japanese haikai poet

== Deaths ==
Birth years link to the corresponding "[year] in poetry" article:

- February/March – Richard Rowlands (born 1550), Anglo-Dutch antiquarian and writer
- March 22 – Thomas Carew (born 1595), English poet
- April 2
  - Paul Fleming (born 1609), German poet and physician
  - Maciej Kazimierz Sarbiewski (born 1595), Polish Jesuit and Latin-language poet
- April 28 (bur.) – William Alabaster (born 1567), English poet and playwright
- September 12 – William Alexander, 1st Earl of Stirling, (born 1567), Scottish statesman, courtier, poet and writer of rhymed tragedies
- October 1 – Claudio Achillini (born 1574), Italian polymath and poet
- Charles Aleyn, English poet
- Daniel Naborowski (born 1573), Polish Baroque poet
- Walter Quin (born c. 1575), Irish-born English court poet and author writing in English, Latin, French and Italian

== See also ==
- Poetry
- 17th century in poetry
- 17th century in literature
