= 1576 in poetry =

List of years in poetry	(table)
- … 1566; 1567; 1568; 1569; 1570; 1571; 1572; 1573; 1574; 1575; 1576; 1577; 1578; 1579; 1580; 1581; 1582; 1583; 1584; 1585; 1586 …
- In literature 1573 1574 1575 1576 1577 1578 1579
- Art; Archaeology; Architecture; Literature; Music; Philosophy; Science; +...

Nationality words link to articles with information on the nation's poetry or literature (for instance, Irish or France).

== Events ==
- Henri III of France revived the Académie du Palais, and Philippe Desportes becomes one of its most active members.

== Works published ==
=== France ===
- Rémy Belleau:
  - Les Amours et nouveaux échanges despierres précieuses, also known as Pierres précieuses poems on the image and arcane powers of precious stone
  - Eclogues sacrées
- Philippe Desportes, an edition of his works

=== Great Britain ===
- The Paradise of Dainty Devices, the most popular of the Elizabethan verse miscellanies, anthology
- Thomas Achelley, A Most Lamentable and Tragicall Historie
- George Gascoigne, The Steele Glas: a Satyre; Togither with the Complainte of Phylomene, called the first non-dramatic poem in blank verse in the English language; an "estates" satire
- George Whetstone, The Rocke of Regard, mostly verse

=== Other ===
- Baptista Mantuanus, Opera Omnia ("Complete Works"), Italian poet writing in Latin, Antwerp
- Tulsidas, Ramcharitmanas, Indian poet writing in the Awadhi dialect of Hindi
- Jan van der Noot - Das Buch Extasis, Dutch poet writing in German, Cologne

== Births ==
- October 7 (baptism) – John Marston (died 1634), English playwright, poet, and satirist
- Also
  - Charles Fitzgeoffrey (died 1638), English Elizabethan poet and clergyman
  - Jean Ogier de Gombauld (died 1666), French playwright and poet
  - John Weever (died 1632), English poet and antiquary

== Deaths ==
- January 19 – Hans Sachs (born 1494), German Meistersinger
- Girolamo Muzio (born 1496), Italian, Latin-language poet
- Mavro Vetranović (born 1482), Croatian writer, poet and Benedictine friar
- Lu Zhi (born 1496), Chinese landscape painter, calligrapher and poet

== See also ==
- Poetry
- 16th century in poetry
- 16th century in literature
- Dutch Renaissance and Golden Age literature
- Elizabethan literature
- French Renaissance literature
- Renaissance literature
- Spanish Renaissance literature
