= 1633 in poetry =

List of years in poetry	(table)
- … 1623; 1624; 1625; 1626; 1627; 1628; 1629; 1630; 1631; 1632; 1633; 1634; 1635; 1636; 1637; 1638; 1639; 1640; 1641; 1642; 1643 …
- In literature 1630 1631 1632 1633 1634 1635 1636
- Art; Archaeology; Architecture; Literature; Music; Philosophy; Science; +...

Nationality words link to articles with information on the nation's poetry or literature (for instance, Irish or France).

== Events ==
- February 27 – A few days before his death from consumption at his rectory in Bemerton (near Salisbury in England), George Herbert calls for a lute so that he can sing religious songs. He has sent his poems, none of which have been published in his lifetime, to Nicholas Ferrar of the Little Gidding community and they are issued later in the year.

== Works published ==
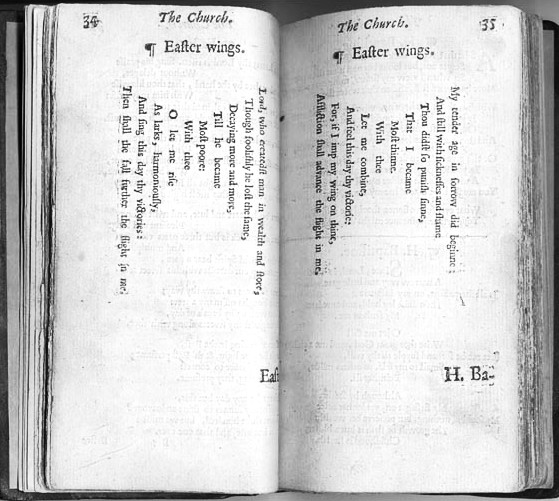
George Herbert's "Easter Wings" in the 1633 edition of The Temple

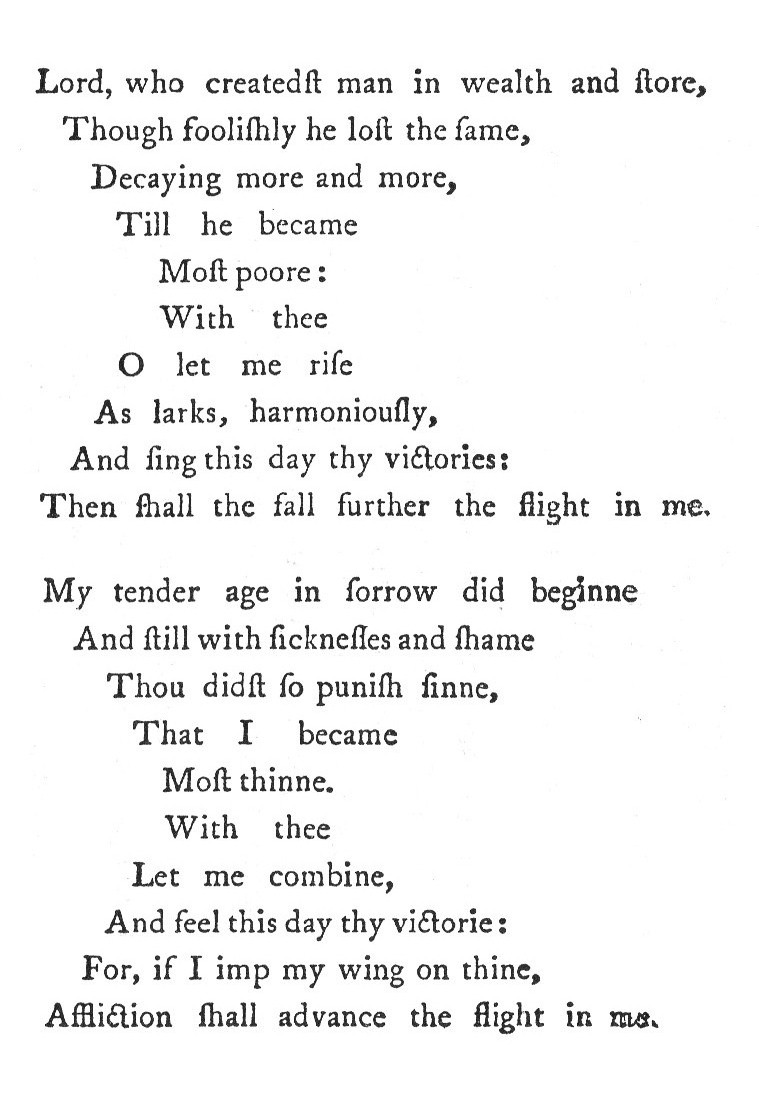
Herbert's "Easter Wings", turned on its side for readability.

=== Great Britain ===
- Abraham Cowley, Poetical Blossomes
- John Donne, Poems, by J.D.: With elegies on the authors death, the first collected edition of the author's works; (seven editions by 1669) including "The Canonization" and the Holy Sonnets
- Phineas Fletcher, The Purple Island; or, The Isle of Man
- George Herbert, The Temple: Sacred poems and private ejaculations, a posthumous collection of all Herbert's poems, including "Easter Wings" (shown at right); edited by Nicholas Ferrar
- Thomas May, The Reigne of King Henry the Second
- Wye Saltonstall, translator, Tristia, from the original Latin of Ovid

=== Other ===
- Luis de Góngora y Argote, edited by Don Gonzalo de Hoces y Cordoba, Todas las obras de don Louis de Gongora en varios poemas, a posthumous edition of Gongora's works often used as a source for later publications in the following centuries; Spain
- François L'Hermite, who wrote under the pen name "Tristan L'Hermite", Les Plaintes d’Acanthe, France

== Births ==
Death years link to the corresponding "[year] in poetry" article:

- Wentworth Dillon, 4th Earl of Roscommon (died 1685), English poet
- George Savile, 1st Marquess of Halifax (died 1695), English statesman, writer, and politician

== Deaths ==
Birth years link to the corresponding "[year] in poetry" article:

- March 1 – George Herbert (born 1593), Welsh-born poet, orator and priest
- August 10 – Anthony Munday (born 1560), English dramatist and miscellaneous writer
- Edmund Bolton (born 1575), English historian and poet
- Hortensio Félix Paravicino (born 1580), Spanish preacher and poet
- Ye Wanwan died this year, according to one source, or in 1632, according to another (born 1610), Chinese poet and daughter of poet Shen Yixiu; also sister of women poets Ye Xiaowan and Ye Xiaoluan

== See also ==
- 17th century in literature
- 17th century in poetry
- Poetry
