= 1627 in poetry =

List of years in poetry	(table)
- … 1617; 1618; 1619; 1620; 1621; 1622; 1623; 1624; 1625; 1626; 1627; 1628; 1629; 1630; 1631; 1632; 1633; 1634; 1635; 1636; 1637 …
- In literature 1624 1625 1626 1627 1628 1629 1630
- Art; Archaeology; Architecture; Literature; Music; Philosophy; Science; +...

Nationality words link to articles with information on the nation's poetry or literature (for instance, Irish or France).

== Events ==
- English poet Sir John Beaumont, 1st Baronet presented with the Beaumont Baronetcy, of Grace Dieu in the County of Leicester

== Works published ==
=== Great Britain ===
- Michael Drayton, The Battaile of Agincourt
- Phineas Fletcher, Locustae, in Latin with English paraphrasing
- Thomas May, translator, Lucan's Pharsalia; or, The Civill Warres of Rome, between Pompey the Great, and Julius Caesar, translated from Latin, completed in 10 books (first three translated books published first in 1626; see also A Continuation 1630)
- Richard Niccols, The Beggers Ape, published anonymously

=== Other ===
- Gabriel Bocángel, Rimas ("Verses"), containing both ballads and sonnets; Spain
- Luis de Góngora (died May 24), Works in verse by the Spanish Homer, collected by Juan López de Vicuña, published posthumously; includes numerous sonnets, odes, ballads, songs for guitar, La Fábula de Polifemo y Galatea, Las Soledades and other long poems; Spain
- François de Malherbe and others, Recueil des plus beaux vers des poètes de ce temps, with many poems by Malherbe and his acknowledged disciples; France
- John of the Cross (died 1591), Spiritual Canticle (Cántico Espiritual), Spain, largely written in 1577, first published in its original language, in Brussels

== Births ==
Death years link to the corresponding "[year] in poetry" article:

- Nicolò Minato (died 1698), Italian poet, librettist and impresario
- Walter Pope (died 1714), English astronomer and poet

== Deaths ==
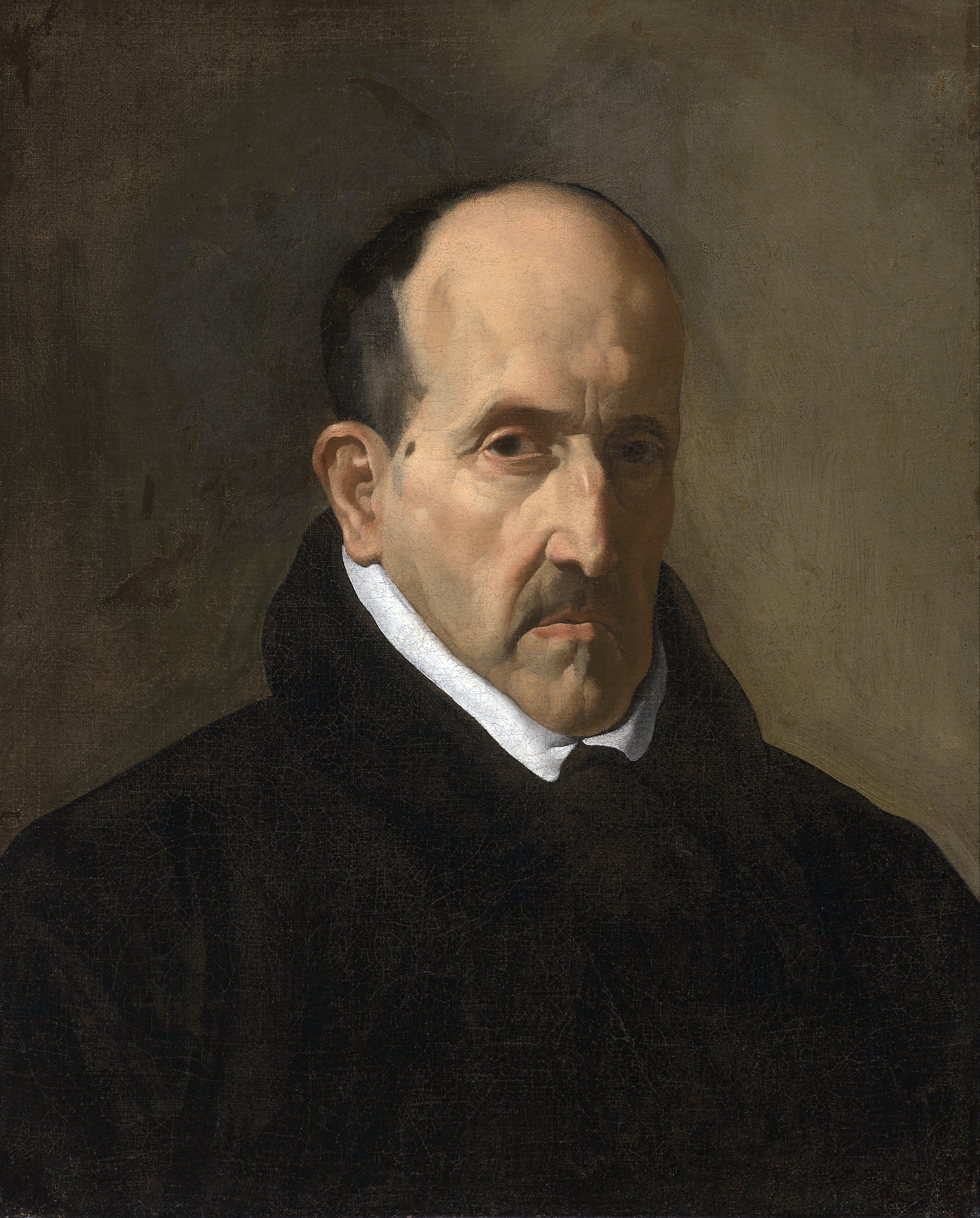
Luis de Góngora, painted by Diego Velázquez in 1622, five years before the poet's death

Birth years link to the corresponding "[year] in poetry" article:

- April 19 – John Beaumont (born 1583), English playwright and poet
- May 24 – Luis de Góngora (born 1561), Spanish lyric poet
- May 26 – Lucy Russell, Countess of Bedford (born 1581), English countess, minor poet, and major patron of poets
- July 4 (bur.) – Thomas Middleton (born 1580), English playwright and poet
- July 9 – Dirk Rafaelsz Camphuysen (born 1586), Dutch painter, poet and theologian
- October – Bernardo de Balbuena (born 1561), Spanish-born Latin American poet
- Also:
  - Charles Best (born 1570), English poet, writer of A Sonnet of the Moon
  - Abdul Rahim Khan-I-Khana (born 1556), Indian poet in Mughal Emperor Akbar court
  - Cormac Mac Con Midhe (born unknown), Irish poet
  - Thomas Seget (born 1569), Scottish poet who wrote in Latin

== See also ==
- Poetry
- 16th century in poetry
- 16th century in literature
