= 1634 in poetry =

List of years in poetry	(table)
- … 1624; 1625; 1626; 1627; 1628; 1629; 1630; 1631; 1632; 1633; 1634; 1635; 1636; 1637; 1638; 1639; 1640; 1641; 1642; 1643; 1644 …
- In literature 1631 1632 1633 1634 1635 1636 1637
- Art; Archaeology; Architecture; Literature; Music; Philosophy; Science; +...

Nationality words link to articles with information on the nation's poetry or literature (for instance, Irish or France).

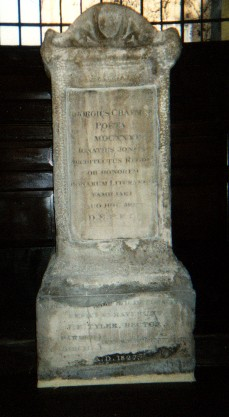
Grave of George Chapman in the Church of St. Giles, London. The tombstone was designed and paid for by Inigo Jones

== Events ==
- The Duke de Medinaceli forces Spanish poet Francisco de Quevedo into a 3-month marriage with Doña Esperanza de Aragón.

== Works published ==
=== Great Britain ===
- Richard Brathwaite, Anniversaries upon his Panarete, anonymously published (see also Anniversaries [...] Continued 1635)
- Richard Crashaw, Epigrammatum Sacrorum Liber, anonymously published
- William Habington, Castara, anonymously published
- Alexander Ross, Virgilii Evangelisantis Christiados, cento
- Alice Sutcliffe, Meditations of Man's Mortalitie: or, A Way to True Blessednesse, in prose and verse

=== Other ===
- Marie de Gournay, also known as Marie le Jars, demoiselle de Gournay, Les Avis et presents, including a feminist tract, translations, moral essays and verse (revised from the original version, Ombre 1626; again revised 1641), France
- Lope de Vega, Spain, La Gatomaquia ("The Catfight"), a mock epic, and Rimas humanas y divinas del licenciado Tomé de Burguillos
- Johannes Narssius, Gustavidos liber quartus

== Births ==
Death years link to the corresponding "[year] in poetry" article:

- January 16 - Dorothe Engelbretsdotter (died 1716), Norwegian poet
- December 15 - Thomas Kingo (died 1703), Danish bishop, poet and hymn-writer

== Deaths ==
Birth years link to the corresponding "[year] in poetry" article:

- May 12 - George Chapman (born 1559), English dramatist, translator and poet
- June 25 - John Marston (born 1576), English dramatist, poet and satirist
- August 23 (bur.) - Tomos Prys (born c. 1564), Welsh-language poet
- Adriano Banchieri (born 1568), Italian composer, music theorist, organist and poet

== See also ==
- Poetry
- 17th century in poetry
- 17th century in literature
