= 1626 in poetry =

List of years in poetry	(table)
- … 1616; 1617; 1618; 1619; 1620; 1621; 1622; 1623; 1624; 1625; 1626; 1627; 1628; 1629; 1630; 1631; 1632; 1633; 1634; 1635; 1636 …
- In literature 1623 1624 1625 1626 1627 1628 1629
- Art; Archaeology; Architecture; Literature; Music; Philosophy; Science; +...

Nationality words link to articles with information on the nation's poetry or literature (for instance, Irish or France).

== Events ==
- February 18 – Poet Abraham Holland dies of the Great Plague of London having on the previous day handed over the manuscript of his poems later published as Hollandi Posthuma (including one on the Plague) to his brother, the printer Henry Holland.

== Works published ==
=== Great Britain ===
- John Kennedy (poet), Calanthrop and Lucilla (republished 1631 as The Ladies Delight; or, The English Gentlewomans History of Calanthrop and Lucilla)
- Thomas May, Pharsalia, Books 1–3 (published in 10 books in 1627; see also A Continuation 1630)
- George Sandys, translator, Ovid's Metamorphosis Englished, complete edition, translated from Ovid's Metamorphoses; see also The First Five Books of Ovid's Metamorphosis 1621; revised 1632 with allegorical commentary and a translation of the first book of the Aeneid of Virgil)
- Sir William Vaughan, The Golden Fleece [...] transported from Cambriol Colchis, by Orpheus junior, long and fantastic prose allegory, demonstrating "the Errours of Religion, the Vices and Decayes of the Kingdome, and lastly the wayes to get wealth, and to restore Trading" through the colonization of Newfoundland
- John Wilson, A Song, or Story, for the Lasting Remembrance of Divers Famous Works (republished as A Song of Deliverance 1680)

=== Other ===
- Claude de L'Estoile, Recueil des plus beaux vers, France
- Marie de Gournay, also known as Marie le Jars, demoiselle de Gournay, Ombre, including a feminist tract, translations, moral essays and verse (later revised and published as Les Avis et presents in 1634; another revision 1641), France

== Births ==
Death years link to the corresponding "[year] in poetry" article:

- January – Sir Robert Howard (died 1698), English playwright, poet and brother-in-law of John Dryden
- July 25 – Gerard Brandt (died 1685), Dutch preacher, playwright, poet, church historian, biographer and naval historian
- Also:
  - Jacques Testu de Belval, born about this year (died 1706), French ecclesiastic and poet
  - Gwilym Puw (died 1689), Welsh Catholic poet and Royalist officer

== Deaths ==
Birth years link to the corresponding "[year] in poetry" article:

- February 18 – Abraham Holland, English poet
- February 28 – Cyril Tourneur (born 1575), English playwright and poet
- April 9 – Francis Bacon (born 1561), English philosopher, statesman, scientist, lawyer, jurist, author and poet
- September 25 – Théophile de Viau (born 1590), French poet and playwright
- October 19–26 – François Béroalde de Verville (born 1556), novelist and poet
- December 8 – Sir John Davies (born 1569), English poet and lawyer, attorney general in Ireland; not to be confused with his contemporary, John Davies of Hereford (c. 1565–1618)
- date not known – Nicholas Breton (also spelled "Nicholas Britton" and "Nicholas Brittaine") (born c. 1545), English poet and novelist

== See also ==
- Poetry
- 17th century in poetry
- 17th century in literature
