= 1579 in poetry =

List of years in poetry	(table)
- … 1569; 1570; 1571; 1572; 1573; 1574; 1575; 1576; 1577; 1578; 1579; 1580; 1581; 1582; 1583; 1584; 1585; 1586; 1587; 1588; 1589 …
- In literature 1576 1577 1578 1579 1580 1581 1582
- Art; Archaeology; Architecture; Literature; Music; Philosophy; Science; +...

Nationality words link to articles with information on the nation's poetry or literature (for instance, Irish or France).

== Events ==
- January 28 - Burmese poets Nawrahta Minsaw and Hsinbyushin Medaw become king and queen consort of Lanna
- Italian poet Torquato Tasso is confined in the Ospedale di Sant'Anna in Ferrara as insane; he remains here until 1586.

== Works published ==
=== Great Britain ===
- Thomas Churchyard, A lamentable and pitifull Description of the wofull warres in Flanders, including two poems (see also his The Miserie of Flaunders, Calamite of Fraunce, Misfortune of Portugall, Unquietnes of Ireland, Troubles of Scotlande: and the Blessed State of Englande 1579)
- Anthony Munday, The Mirrour of Mutabilitie, or Principall Part of the Mirrour for Magistrates
- Edmund Spenser, writing as "Immerto", The Shepheardes Calender, many editions

=== Other ===
- Philippe Desportes, an edition of his works; France
- Catherine Des Roches, also known as "Catherine Fradonnet", Oeuvres, Paris: Abel L'Angelier published this year and in 1578, France
- Giovanni Viperano, De poetica libri tres, Antwerp (criticism)

== Births ==
- March 24 – Tirso de Molina (died 1648), Spanish Baroque dramatist and poet
- August 1 – Luis Vélez de Guevara (died 1644), Spanish dramatist, poet and novelist
- September 16 – Samuel Coster (died 1665), Dutch playwright and poet
- December 20 (bapt.) – John Fletcher (died 1625), English playwright and poet
- Arthur Johnston (died 1641), Scottish poet and physician
- Rhys Prichard (died 1644), Welsh language poet and Anglican vicar

== Deaths ==
- September 28 – Márton Rakovszky (born 1535), Slovak poet and scholar
- November 21 – Cipriano Piccolpasso (born 1524), Italian poet and author

== See also ==
- Poetry
- 16th century in poetry
- 16th century in literature
- Dutch Renaissance and Golden Age literature
- Elizabethan literature
- French Renaissance literature
- Renaissance literature
- Spanish Renaissance literature
