= 1635 in poetry =

List of years in poetry	(table)
- … 1625; 1626; 1627; 1628; 1629; 1630; 1631; 1632; 1633; 1634; 1635; 1636; 1637; 1638; 1639; 1640; 1641; 1642; 1643; 1644; 1645 …
- In literature 1632 1633 1634 1635 1636 1637 1638
- Art; Archaeology; Architecture; Literature; Music; Philosophy; Science; +...

Nationality words link to articles with information on the nation's poetry or literature (for instance, Irish or France).

== Events ==
- August 27 – Spanish playwright and poet Lope de Vega dies aged 72 of scarlet fever in Madrid. This year also his illegitimate son Lope Félix, another poet, is drowned in a shipwreck off the coast of Venezuela and his youngest daughter Antonia Clara is abducted.
- Ottoman Turkish poet Nef'i is garroted in the grounds of the Topkapi Palace in Istanbul for his satirical verses.

== Works published ==
=== Great Britain ===
- Thomas Heywood:
  - The Hierarchie of the Blessed Angells, has the much-quoted passage "Mellifluous Shakes-peare, whose inchanting Quill/Commanded Mirth or Passion" ...
  - Philocothonista; or, The Drunkard, Opened, Dissected, and Anatomized
- Francis Quarles, Emblemes
- Joseph Rutter, The Shepheard's Holy-Day: A pastorall tragi-comaedie
- George Wither, A Collection of Emblemes, Ancient and Moderne, with emblems printed from engravings originally produced by Crispijn van de Passe the Elder for Gabriel Rollenhagen's Nucleus Emblematorum 1611–1613

=== Other ===
- Gabriel Bocángel, Lira de las muses ("The Muses' Lyre"), containing both ballads and sonnets; Spain
- Jean Chapelain, De la poésie représentative, France
- Lope de Vega, Filis, eclogue, Spain
- Antoine Godeau, Discours sur la Poésie Chrétienne, France

== Births ==
- February 21 – Thomas Flatman (died 1688), English poet and miniature painter
- June 3 – Philippe Quinault (died 1688), French dramatist, poet, and librettist
- September 20 (bapt.) – Thomas Sprat (died 1713), English bishop and poet

== Deaths ==
Birth years link to the corresponding "[year] in poetry" article:

- March – Thomas Randolph (born 1605), English poet and dramatist
- April 7 – Leonard Digges (born 1588), English poet and translator
- April 25 – Alessandro Tassoni (born 1565), Italian
- July 28 – Richard Corbet (born 1582), English
- August 7 – Friedrich Spee (born 1591), German Jesuit and poet
- August 27 – Lope de Vega (born 1562), Spanish playwright and poet
- October 18 – Jean de Schelandre (born c. 1585), French
- Nef'i (born 1582?), Ottoman Turkish
- Shen Yixiu (born 1590), Chinese poet and mother of female poets Ye Xiaoluan, Ye Wanwan and Ye Xiaowan

== See also ==
- Poetry
- 17th century in poetry
- 17th century in literature
