= 1642 in poetry =

List of years in poetry	(table)
- … 1632; 1633; 1634; 1635; 1636; 1637; 1638; 1639; 1640; 1641; 1642; 1643; 1644; 1645; 1646; 1647; 1648; 1649; 1650; 1651; 1652 …
- In literature 1639 1640 1641 1642 1643 1644 1645
- Art; Archaeology; Architecture; Literature; Music; Philosophy; Science; +...

Nationality words link to articles with information on the nation's poetry or literature (for instance, Irish or France).

== Events ==
- May–June – English Cavalier poet Richard Lovelace is incarcerated in the Gatehouse Prison, Westminster for defying Parliament, during which time he perhaps writes To Althea, from Prison

== Works published ==
- John Denham, Cooper's Hill, the first example in English of a poem devoted to local description, in this case the Thames scenery around the author's home at Egham in Surrey; the poem was rewritten many times and later received high praise from Samuel Johnson, although Denham's reputation later ebbed
- Arthur Johnston, died 1641, Opera, Scottish poet writing in Latin
- Sir Francis Kynaston, Leoline and Sydanis
- Henry More, Psychodia Platonica; or, A Platonicall Song of the Soul
- Alexander Ross, Mel Heliconium; or, Poeticall Honey
- John Taylor, Mad Fashions, Odd Fashions, All Out of Fashions; or, The Emblems of those Distracted Times

== Births ==
Death years link to the corresponding "[year] in poetry" article:

- Abdul-Qādir Bēdil (died 1720), Persian poet and Sufi
- Yusuf Nabi (died 1712), Turkish diwan poet
- Ihara Saikaku (died 1693), Japanese poet and creator of the "floating world" genre of Japanese prose, ukiyo-zōshi
- Thomas Shadwell (died 1692), English poet and playwright appointed poet laureate in 1689
- Edward Taylor (died 1729), Colonial American poet, physician and clergyman
- December 30 – Vincenzo da Filicaja (died 1707), Italian poet

== Deaths ==
Birth years link to the corresponding "[year] in poetry" article:

- June 1 – Sir John Suckling (born 1609), English
- John Chalkhill (born 1594), English
- Francis Kynaston (born 1587), English courtier, poet and translator
- James Mabbe (born 1572), English scholar, poet and translator

== See also ==
- Poetry
- 17th century in poetry
- 17th century in literature
- Cavalier poets in England, who supported the monarch against the puritans in the English Civil War
