= 1567 in poetry =

List of years in poetry	(table)
- … 1557; 1558; 1559; 1560; 1561; 1562; 1563; 1564; 1565; 1566; 1567; 1568; 1569; 1570; 1571; 1572; 1573; 1574; 1575; 1576; 1577 …
- In literature 1564 1565 1566 1567 1568 1569 1570
- Art; Archaeology; Architecture; Literature; Music; Philosophy; Science; +...

Nationality words link to articles with information on the nation's poetry or literature (for instance, Irish or France).

== Events ==
- Philippe Desportes' verses first come to public attention when they are sung during a court performance of Jean-Antoine de Baïf's Le Brave (France).

== Works published ==
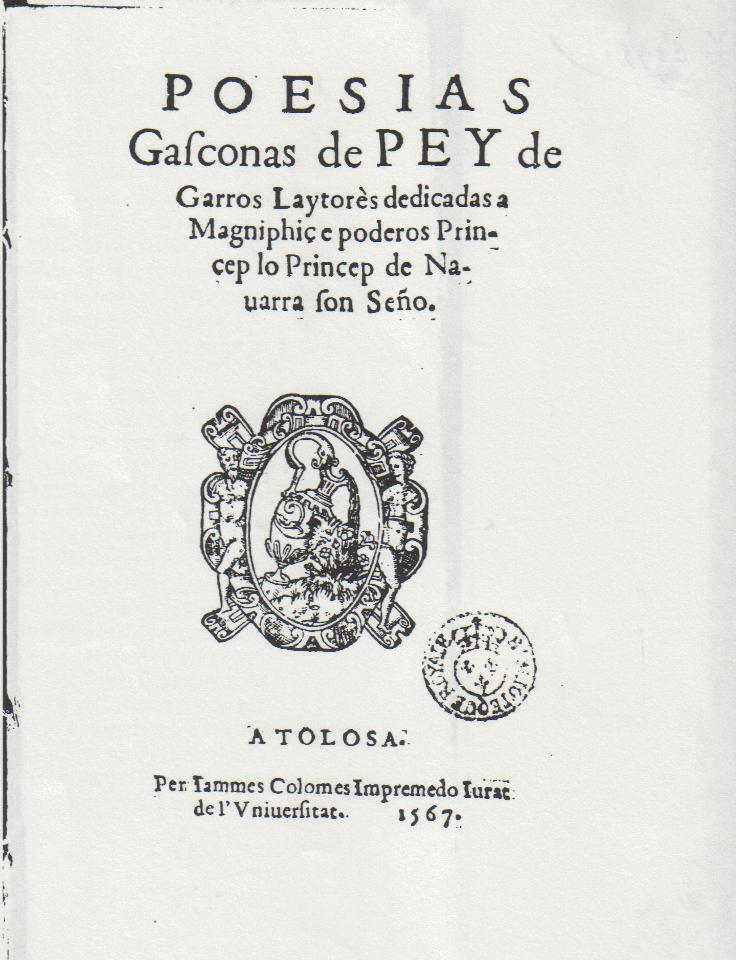
Title page of the Poesias Gasconas

=== English ===
- Arthur Golding, Metamorphosis, Books 1–15, (translation of Ovid's Metamorphoses; see also The fyrst fower bookes 1565; many editions into the 17th century)
- George Turberville:
  - The Eglogs of the Poet B. Mantuan Carmelitan, Turned into English Verse, translation and adaptation from Baptista Spagnuoli Mantuanus Adolescentia seu Bucolica)
  - Epitaphs, Epigrams, Songs and Sonnets
  - The Heroycall Epistles of ... Publius Ovidius Naso, in Englishe Verse, translation of Ovid's Heroides, many editions
- Isabella Whitney, The Copy of a Letter, Lately Written in Meter by a Young Gentlewoman: to her Unconstant Lover, publication year conjectural; earliest known volume of English language secular poetry published by a woman

=== Other ===
- Jean-Antoine de Baif, Le Premier des Météores, a didactic poem on astronomy, France
- Anna Bijns, Refrains, Netherlands, third edition (first edition 1528, second edition 1548)
- Pey de Garros, Poesias Gasconas, Gascon poetry, France
- Torquato Tasso, Discoursi dell'arte poetica ("Discourses on the Heroic Poem"), published from this year through 1570, Italian criticism

== Births ==
Death years link to the corresponding "[year] in poetry" article:

- February 12 – Thomas Campion (died 1620), English composer, poet and physician
- February 27 – William Alabaster (died 1640), English poet
- November – Thomas Nashe (died c. 1601), English, pamphleteer, poet and satirist
- December 15 – Christoph Demantius (died 1643), German composer, music theorist, writer and poet
- Also:
  - Valens Acidalius (died 1595), German critic and poet writing in Latin
  - William Alexander, 1st Earl of Stirling, birth year uncertain (died 1640), Scottish statesman, courtier, poet and writer of rhymed tragedies
  - Anthony Copley (died 1609), English Catholic poet and conspirator
  - Eochaidh Ó hÉoghusa (died 1617), Irish poet
  - John Salusbury (died 1612), Welsh knight, politician and poet

== Deaths ==
Birth years link to the corresponding "[year] in poetry" article:

- May 2 – Marin Držić, also known as "Marino Darza" and "Marino Darsa" (born 1508), Croatian dramatist, author and poet
- Also:
  - Thomas Beccon (born 1512), English
  - Nicolaus Mameranus, year of death uncertain (born 1500), Luxembourgish poet and historian

== See also ==
- Poetry
- 16th century in poetry
- 16th century in literature
- Dutch Renaissance and Golden Age literature
- Elizabethan literature
- French Renaissance literature
- Renaissance literature
- Spanish Renaissance literature
