= 1589 in poetry =

List of years in poetry	(table)
- … 1579; 1580; 1581; 1582; 1583; 1584; 1585; 1586; 1587; 1588; 1589; 1590; 1591; 1592; 1593; 1594; 1595; 1596; 1597; 1598; 1599 …
- In literature 1586 1587 1588 1589 1590 1591 1592
- Art; Archaeology; Architecture; Literature; Music; Philosophy; Science; +...

Nationality words link to articles with information on the nation's poetry or literature (for instance, Irish or France).

== Events ==
- Christopher Marlowe wrote The Passionate Shepherd to His Love either this year or in 1588 (first published 1599)

== Works published ==
=== Great Britain ===
- William Byrd, Psalmes, Sonets & Songs of Sadnes and Pietie, Made into Musicke of Five Parts, verse and music
- Thomas Deloney, A New Ballet of the Straunge and Most Cruell Whippes which the Spanyards Had Prepared to Whippe and Torment English Men and Women, a ballad
- Anne Dowriche (A.D.), The French Historie
- Anthony Munday, A Banquet of Daintie Conceits
- George Puttenham, authorship uncertain, Arte of English Poesie, the first draft is thought to have been written in the 1560s, with revisions thereafter, up to its publication; the most systematic and comprehensive treatise of the time on poetry; "contrived into three bookes: the first of poets and poesies [a general history of poetry and descriptions of various forms], the second of proportion [on prosody and the measures in use in English verse], the third of ornament [on style, the distinctions between written and spoken language and other matters]" the work concludes with lengthy observations on good manners
- Sir Philip Sidney, Defense of Poesie, criticism
- Nicholas Yonge, Musica Transalpina. Cantus, verse and music (see also Musica Transalpina 1597)

=== Other ===
- Flor de Varios Romances Nuevos, a famous Spanish poetry anthology; includes 12 romances by Luis de Góngora y Argote
- Alonso de Ercilla, La Araucana, an epic poem about the conquest of Chile; the first part originally appeared in 1569, the second part was published for the first time om 1578 (together with the first part), the third part was published for the first time this year (together with the first and second parts); Spain

== Births ==
- January 9 – Ivan Gundulić (died 1638), Croatian Baroque poet
- February 5
  - Honorat de Bueil, seigneur de Racan (died 1670), French aristocrat, soldier, poet, dramatist and original member of the Académie française
  - Esteban Manuel de Villegas (died 1669), Spanish
- Also:
  - Konstantinos Kallokratos (died unknown) Greek teacher and poet
  - Antoine Le Métel d'Ouville (born about this year (died 1655), French engineer, geographer, poet, playwright and author
  - Jean Sirmond (died 1649), French neo-Latin poet and man of letters

== Deaths ==
- October 15 – Jean-Antoine de Baïf (born 1532), French poet and member of La Pléiade
- Also:
  - Heo Nanseolheon (born 1563), Korean scholar and poet writing mainly in Chinese, a woman
  - Mathias Holtzwart died sometime after this year (born about 1540), German
  - Pavel Kyrmezer (birth year not known), Slovak
  - Thomas Sébillet (born 1512), French lawyer, essayist, neo-Platonist grammarian and writer on poetry

== See also ==
- Poetry
- 16th century in poetry
- 16th century in literature
- Dutch Renaissance and Golden Age literature
- Elizabethan literature
- English Madrigal School
- French Renaissance literature
- Renaissance literature
- Spanish Renaissance literature
- University Wits
