= 1570 in poetry =

| List of years in poetry | (table) |
- … 1560; 1561; 1562; 1563; 1564; 1565; 1566; 1567; 1568; 1569; 1570; 1571; 1572; 1573; 1574; 1575; 1576; 1577; 1578; 1579; 1580 …
- In literature 1567 1568 1569 1570 1571 1572 1573
- Art; Archaeology; Architecture; Literature; Music; Philosophy; Science; +...

Nationality words link to articles with information on the nation's poetry or literature (for instance, Irish or France).

== Events ==
- Formation in Paris of Antoine de Baïf's Académie de Poésie et Musique, and consequent development of musique mesurée by composers such as Claude Le Jeune and Guillaume Costeley
- Torquato Tasso travels to Paris in the service of Cardinal Luigi d'Este.

== Works published ==
- Thomas Churchyard, A Discourse of Rebellion
- Lodovico Castelvetro, Poetica d'Aristotele vulgarizzata e sposita ("The Poetics of Aristotle in the Vulgar Language"), called the most famous Italian Renaissance commentary on Aristotle's Poetics
- Thomas Preston, A Lamentation from Rome how the Pope doth bewayle the Rebelles in England cannot prevayle. To the tune of "How well, ye mariners", a broadside ballad; published in London by William Griffith

== Births ==
Death years link to the corresponding "[year] in poetry" article:

- Sir Robert Aytoun (died 1638), Scottish poet
- Eliáš Láni (died 1618), Slovak
- Thomas Bateson, also spelled "Batson" or "Betson", birth year uncertain (died 1630), English writer of madrigals
- Charles Best (died 1627), English poet, writer of "A Sonnet of the Moon"
- Tadhg mac Dáire Mac Bruaideadha (died 1652), Irish Gaelic poet and historian
- Francisco de Medrano born (died 1607), Spanish
- Pedro de Oña (died 1643), first known Chilean poet
- Samuel Rowlands, birth year uncertain (died c. 1630), English pamphleteer, poet and satirist
- François du Souhait, born between 1570 and 1580 (died 1617), French language translator, novelist, poet, satirist, and moral philosopher
- Adrianus Valeriuss, born sometime from this year to 1575 (died 1625), Dutch
- Yuan Zhongdao (died 1624), Chinese poet, essayist, travel diarist and official

== Deaths ==
Birth years link to the corresponding "[year] in poetry" article:

- March 25 – Johann Walter (born 1496), German poet and composer
- November – Jacques Grévin (born c. 1539), French playwright and poet

== See also ==
- Poetry
- 16th century in poetry
- 16th century in literature
- Dutch Renaissance and Golden Age literature
- Elizabethan literature
- French Renaissance literature
- Renaissance literature
- Spanish Renaissance literature
