= 1637 in poetry =

List of years in poetry	(table)
- … 1627; 1628; 1629; 1630; 1631; 1632; 1633; 1634; 1635; 1636; 1637; 1638; 1639; 1640; 1641; 1642; 1643; 1644; 1645; 1646; 1647 …
- In literature 1634 1635 1636 1637 1638 1639 1640
- Art; Archaeology; Architecture; Literature; Music; Philosophy; Science; +...

Nationality words link to articles with information on the nation's poetry or literature (for instance, Irish or France).

== Events ==
- After August 16 – Sir William Davenant becomes poet laureate of England on the death of Ben Jonson (on the death of Davenant in 1668, he is succeeded by John Dryden)

== Works published ==
- Sir William Alexander, Recreations with the Muses, contains Four Monarchicke Tragedies, Doomesday, A Paraenesis to Prince Henry (all previously published), and Jonathan: An heroicke poem
- Arthur Johnston, Scottish poet writing in Latin
  - Psalmorum Davidis paraphrasis poetica et canticorum evangelicorum, translation of the Psalms
  - Deliciae poetarum Scotorum huius aevi illustrium, edited anthology
- Thomas Jordan, Poeticall Varieties; or, Varietie of Fancies including "Coronemus nos Rosis antequam marcescant" ("Let us drink and be merry")
- Ralph Knevet, Funerall Elegies, elegies on Lady Katherine Paston
- Shackerley Marmion, The Legend of Cupid and Psyche
- Nathaniel Whiting, Le hore di recreatione; or, The Pleasant Historie of Albino and Bellama

== Births ==
Death years link to the corresponding "[year] in poetry" article:

- August 16 – Emilie Juliane of Schwarzburg-Rudolstadt (died 1706), German countess and hymn writer

== Deaths ==
Birth years link to the corresponding "[year] in poetry" article:

- Before July – Henry Adamson (born 1581), Scottish poet and historian
- February 3 – Gervase Markham (born 1568), English poet and writer
- May 29 – Jiří Třanovský, also known as "Juraj Tranovský" or "Georgius Tranoscius" (Latinized) (born 1592), Czech and Slovak hymnwriter, sometimes called the father of Slovak hymnody and the "Luther of the Slavs"
- July 26 – Philippe Habert (born 1604), French poet
- August 10 – Edward King (born 1612), Irish poet writing in Latin in England; a friend of John Milton who writes "Lycidas" in his memory (contributed to Justa Edouardo King Naufrago, 1638); drowned in shipwreck in the Irish Sea
- c. August 16 – Ben Jonson (born 1572), English playwright and poet
- Johannes Narssius (born 1580), Dutch-born New Latin poet and physician

== See also ==
- 17th century in literature
- 17th century in poetry
- Poetry
