= 1619 in poetry =

List of years in poetry	(table)
- … 1609; 1610; 1611; 1612; 1613; 1614; 1615; 1616; 1617; 1618; 1619; 1620; 1621; 1622; 1623; 1624; 1625; 1626; 1627; 1628; 1629 …
- In literature 1616 1617 1618 1619 1620 1621 1622
- Art; Archaeology; Architecture; Literature; Music; Philosophy; Science; +...

Nationality words link to articles with information on the nation's poetry or literature (for instance, Irish or France).

== Events ==
- April – English poet Ben Jonson visits Scottish poet William Drummond of Hawthornden.
- c. October – Following the death of Samuel Daniel, Ben Jonson becomes Poet Laureate of the Kingdom of England (on Johnson's death in 1637 he is succeeded by William Davenant).
- Martin Opitz becomes the leader of the school of young poets in Heidelberg.

== Works published ==
- Richard Braithwaite, writing under the pen name "Musophilus", A New Spring Shadowed in Sundry Pithie Poems
- Sir John Davies, Nosce Teipsum (see also Nosce Teipsum 1599, 1622)
- Michael Drayton, Idea
- Henry Hutton, Follie's Anatomie; or, Satyres and Satiricall Epigrams
- George Wither, Fidelia

== Births ==
Death years link to the corresponding "[year] in poetry" article:

- January 21 – Anders Bording (died 1677), Danish poet and journalist
- March 6 – Cyrano de Bergerac (died 1655), French soldier and poet
- Moses Belmonte (died 1647), Spanish polyglot poet and translator
- Bedřich Bridel (died 1680), Czech baroque writer, poet and missionary
- William Chamberlayne (died 1703), English poet, playwright, physician and Royalist soldier
- Morgan Llwyd (died 1659), Welsh Puritan preacher, poet and prose writer
- Shalom Shabazi (died 1720), Jewish poet of Yemen

== Deaths ==
Birth years link to the corresponding "[year] in poetry" article:

- April 21 – Shlomo Ephraim Luntschitz (born 1550), Polish rabbi, poet and Torah commentator
- October 14 – Samuel Daniel (born 1562), English Poet Laureate and historian
- Frei Agostinho da Cruz (born 1540), brother of Diogo Bernardes, Portuguese
- Probable year – Ginés Pérez de Hita (born 1544), Spanish novelist and poet

== See also ==
- Poetry
- 17th century in poetry
- 17th century in literature
