= 1625 in poetry =

List of years in poetry	(table)
- … 1615; 1616; 1617; 1618; 1619; 1620; 1621; 1622; 1623; 1624; 1625; 1626; 1627; 1628; 1629; 1630; 1631; 1632; 1633; 1634; 1635 …
- In literature 1622 1623 1624 1625 1626 1627 1628
- Art; Archaeology; Architecture; Literature; Music; Philosophy; Science; +...

Nationality words link to articles with information on the nation's poetry or literature (for instance, Irish or France).

== Events ==
- John Milton enters Christ's College, Cambridge.

== Works published ==
=== Great Britain ===
- Thomas Heywood:
  - Translator, Art of Love, publication year uncertain; published anonymously; translated from Ovid, Ars amatoria
- A Funeral Elegie: Upon the much lamented death of [...] King James
- Francis Quarles, Sions Sonnets (see also Sions Elegies 1624)

=== Other ===
- Honorat de Bueil de Racan, Les Bergeries, France
- Honoré d'Urfé, Sylvanire, France

== Births ==
Death years link to the corresponding "[year] in poetry" article:

- Miguel de Barrios (died 1701), Spanish poet and historian
- Dáibhí Ó Bruadair (died 1698), Irish language poet
- John Caryll (died 1711), English poet, dramatist and diplomat
- Samuel Chappuzeau (died 1701), French scholar, author, poet and playwright
- Marusia Churai (died 1689), semi-mythical Ukrainian Baroque composer, poet and singer
- Jacques de Coras (died 1677), French poet and minister
- Moses ben Mordecai Zacuto (died 1697), kabalistic writer and poet
- Katarina Zrinska (died 1673), Croatian noblewoman and poet

== Deaths ==
Birth years link to the corresponding "[year] in poetry" article:

- March 26 – Giambattista Marino (born 1569), Italian poet famous for his long epic L'Adone
- August 29 (bur.) – John Fletcher (born 1579), English dramatist and poet
- September – Thomas Lodge (born 1558), English dramatist, writer and physician
- September 20 – Heinrich Meibom (born 1555), German historian and poet
- October 10 – Arthur Gorges (born 1569), English poet, translator, courtier and naval captain
- Israel ben Moses Najara (born 1555), Hebrew poet in Palestine (Ottoman Empire)
- Adrianus Valerius (born 1570), Dutch

== See also ==
- Poetry
- 16th century in poetry
- 16th century in literature
