= 1560 in poetry =

List of years in poetry	(table)
- … 1550; 1551; 1552; 1553; 1554; 1555; 1556; 1557; 1558; 1559; 1560; 1561; 1562; 1563; 1564; 1565; 1566; 1567; 1568; 1569; 1570 …
- In literature 1557 1558 1559 1560 1561 1562 1563
- Art; Archaeology; Architecture; Literature; Music; Philosophy; Science; +...

Nationality words link to articles with information on the nation's poetry or literature (for instance, Irish or France).

== Events ==
- Pierre de Ronsard becomes court poet to Charles IX of France
- José de Anchieta, De Gestis Mendi de Saa, written about this year, published in 1563; Portuguese in Brazil

== Works published ==
=== France ===
- Rémy Belleau, a commentary on Pierre de Ronsard's Second Livre des Amours, criticism
- Jacques Grévin, Olime, containing odes, a pastoral, satirical sonnets and love sonnets; also including poems by Joachim Du Bellay and Rémy Belleau
- Pierre de Ronsard, France:
  - Discours
  - Oeuvres ("Works"), first edition

=== Great Britain ===
- Anonymous, Dane Hew, publication year conjectural (sometime from this year to 1584); comic tale of a lecherous monk murdered by an enraged husband, in which the corpse is moved back and forth between the murder scene and an abbey
- William Baldwin, The Funeralles of King Edward the Sixt
- Thomas Churchyard, The Contention Betwyxte Churchyard and Camell, upon David Dycers Dreame
- Barnabe Googe, The Zodiac of Life, Books 1–3, translation of Marcello Palingenio Stellato's Zodiacus vitae (c. 1528); see also, editions of 1561, 1565
- John Heywood, A Fourth Hundred of Epygrams ("Fourth Hundred" actually means "fifth"; see also An Hundred Epigrammes 1550, Works 1562
- Ann Lok, Sermons of John Calvin including (as Part 2), Meditation of a Penitent Sinner: Written in maner of a paraphrase upon the 51. Psalme of David — generally regarded as the first sonnet sequence in English
- Edward More, The Defence of Women, a reply to The Schole House of Women, which was anonymously published in 1541 (other replies Edward Gosynhyll's The Prayse of all Women and A Dyalogue Defensyve for Women against Malycyous Detractours by Robert Burdet, both 1542); Great Britain

=== Other ===
- Bernardo Tasso, L'Amadigi, Italian epic poem published in Venice
- Judah Zarco, Leḥem Yehuda ("Judah's Bread"), Hebrew work published in Istanbul

== Births ==
Death years link to the corresponding "[year] in poetry" article:

- August 4 – Sir John Harington, sources differ on whether he was born this year or in 1561 (died 1612), English courtier, author, poet and inventor of a flush toilet
- Also:
  - Henry Chettle, birth year uncertain (died c. 1607), English playwright, writer and poet
  - William Fowler, birth year uncertain (died 1612), Scottish poet, writer, courtier and translator
  - Alexander Hume, birth year uncertain (died 1609), Scottish
  - Christopher Middleton, birth year uncertain (died 1628), English poet and translator
  - Sheikh Muhammad (died 1650), Indian Marathi language religious leader and poet
  - Anthony Munday (died 1633), English dramatist and miscellaneous writer
  - John Owen born about this year (died 1622), Welsh poet writing in Latin

== Deaths ==
Birth years link to the corresponding "[year] in poetry" article:

- January 1 – Joachim du Bellay (born c. 1522), French poet
- April 19 – Philipp Melanchthon died (born 1497), German professor, theologian and poet
- August 12 – Thomas Phaer, also spelled Phaire, Faer, Phayre, Phayer (born c. 1510), English lawyer, pediatrician, author, translator and poet
- December 21 – Georg Thym (born c. 1520), German teacher, poet and writer
- Approximate date – Hwang Jini (born c. 1506), Korean poet

== See also ==
- 16th century in poetry
- 16th century in literature
- Dutch Renaissance and Golden Age literature
- Elizabethan literature
- French Renaissance literature
- Renaissance literature
- Spanish Renaissance literature
