= 1563 in poetry =

List of years in poetry	(table)
- … 1553; 1554; 1555; 1556; 1557; 1558; 1559; 1560; 1561; 1562; 1563; 1564; 1565; 1566; 1567; 1568; 1569; 1570; 1571; 1572; 1573 …
- In literature 1560 1561 1562 1563 1564 1565 1566
- Art; Archaeology; Architecture; Literature; Music; Philosophy; Science; +...

Nationality words link to articles with information on the nation's poetry or literature (for instance, Irish or France).

== Events ==
- February 14 – French poet Pierre de Bocosel de Chastelard is discovered hiding under the bed of Mary, Queen of Scots. He is executed about a week later.

== Works published ==
=== England ===
- Anonymous, The Courte of Venus, publication year conjectural, revised from the 1538 edition, with several other ballads
- Barnabe Googe, Eglogs, Epytaphes, and Sonettes (sources disagree on the year of publication; another source gives the year as 1562

=== Italy ===
- Antonio Sebastiano Minturno, L'arte poetica, criticism
- Giangiorgio Trissino, La poetica, Books 5–6 (Books 1–4 published in 1529), Italy

=== Other ===
- José de Anchieta, De Gestis Mendi de Saa ("The deeds of Mem"), printed in Coimbra; written about 1560; Spanish in Brazil
- Pierre de Ronsard, Trois livres du recueil de nouvelles poesies, France, criticism

== Births ==
Death years link to the corresponding "[year] in poetry" article:

- Michael Drayton (died 1631), England
- Heo Nanseolheon (died 1589), Korean scholar and poet who also wrote in Chinese, a woman
- Pierre Matthieu (died 1621), French playwright, poet and historian
- Josuah Sylvester (died 1618), England

== Deaths ==
Birth years link to the corresponding "[year] in poetry" article:

- March 19 – Arthur Brooke (born unknown), English poet whose only known work is The Tragicall History of Romeus and Juliet (1562), considered to be William Shakespeare's chief source for his famous play Romeo and Juliet
- May 21 – Martynas Mažvydas (born 1510), author and editor of the first printed book in the Lithuanian language, including the first poetry
- August 18 – Étienne de La Boétie (born 1530), French political philosopher and sonnet writer
- William Baldwin (born c. 1515), English
- Tani Soyo 谷宗養 died (born 1526), Japanese renga poet; a rival of Satomura Joha; son of Tani Sobuko

== See also ==
- Poetry
- 16th century in poetry
- 16th century in literature
- Dutch Renaissance and Golden Age literature
- Elizabethan literature
- French Renaissance literature
- Renaissance literature
- Spanish Renaissance literature
