= 1623 in poetry =

List of years in poetry	(table)
- … 1613; 1614; 1615; 1616; 1617; 1618; 1619; 1620; 1621; 1622; 1623; 1624; 1625; 1626; 1627; 1628; 1629; 1630; 1631; 1632; 1633 …
- In literature 1620 1621 1622 1623 1624 1625 1626
- Art; Archaeology; Architecture; Literature; Music; Philosophy; Science; +...

Nationality words link to articles with information on the nation's poetry or literature (for instance, Irish or France).

== Events ==
- Maciej Kazimierz Sarbiewski is appointed poeta laureatus by the Pope

== Works published ==
=== Great Britain ===
- John Abbot, Jesus Preffigured; or, A Poem of the Holy Name of Jesus in Five Bookes, only two of the five books were published
- Robert Aylet, Joseph; or, Pharoah's Favourite [sic], published anonymously
- Samuel Daniel, The Whole Workes of Samuel Daniel Esquire in Poetrie
- William Drummond, Flowres of Sion (see also A Midnights Trance 1619)
- George Wither, The Hymnes and Songs of the Church, published anonymously; music by Orlando Gibbons; there were several editions this year

=== Other ===
- Agrippa d'Aubigné, Nouvelle édition des Tragiques, France
- Michelangelo Buonarroti, Rime di Michelagnolo Buonarroti raccolte da Michelagnolo suo nipote, Florence: Giunti; Italy
- Martin Opitz, Lob des Feldlebens, Germany
- Théophile de Viau, Les Amours tragiques de Pyrame et Thisbé, France

== Births ==
Death years link to the corresponding "[year] in poetry" article:

- Mei Qing (died 1697), Chinese landscape painter, calligrapher, and poet
- Margaret Cavendish, Duchess of Newcastle-upon-Tyne (died 1673), English aristocrat, poet and writer

== Deaths ==
Birth years link to the corresponding "[year] in poetry" article:

- March 29 – Scévole de Sainte-Marthe (born 1536), French poet
- April 21 – Nicolas Coeffeteau (born 1574), French theologian, poet and historian
- July/August – Tulsidas, तुलसीदास, also known as Gosvāmī Tulsīdās and Tulasī Dāsa (born 1497 or 1532), Awadhi poet and philosopher
- November – Giles Fletcher (born 1586), English poet chiefly known for the allegorical poem Christ's Victory and Triumph
- Gaspar Aguilar (born 1561), Spanish poet and dramatist
- Jean de La Ceppède (born 1548), French poet
- Francesc Vicent Garcia (born 1582), Catalan poet
- Alonso de Ledesma, (born 1552, according to many sources, or 1562, according to many others) Spanish
- Hieronim Morsztyn (born 1581), Polish poet

== See also ==
- Poetry
