= 1557 in poetry =

List of years in poetry	(table)
- … 1547; 1548; 1549; 1550; 1551; 1552; 1553; 1554; 1555; 1556; 1557; 1558; 1559; 1560; 1561; 1562; 1563; 1564; 1565; 1566; 1567 …
- In literature 1554 1555 1556 1557 1558 1559 1560
- Art; Archaeology; Architecture; Literature; Music; Philosophy; Science; +...

Nationality words link to articles with information on the nation's poetry or literature (for instance, Irish or France).

== Events ==
- Joachim du Bellay returns to France from Rome, where he had accompanied (as a secretary) his cousin, Cardinal Jean du Bellay, on a visit that began in 1553.

== Works published ==
=== Great Britain ===
- John Heywood, A Breefe Balet Touching the Traytorous Takynge of Scarborow Castell, patriotic ballad about the capture of Scarborough Castle in April of this year by Thomas Stafford, who held it for two days before the earl of Westmoreland took it
- Henry Howard, Earl of Surrey, Certain Bokes of Virgiles Aeneis, translated from Virgil's Aeneid, Books 2 and 4 (Book 4 translation first published in 1554)
- Thomas Tusser, A Hundreth Good Pointes of Husbandrie, describing the farmer's year, month by month (expanded edition 1562; see also Five Hundreth Points 1573)
- Richard Tottel, editor, Songes and Sonettes, written by the ryght honorable Lorde Henry Haward late Earle of Surrey, and others, better known as Tottel's Miscellany, including the first publication of original poems by Henry Howard, Earl of Surrey (beheaded 1547) and Sir Thomas Wyatt (died 1542)

=== Other ===
- Giovanni Battista Giraldi, Ercole, Italy
- Olivier de Magny, Les Souspirs d'Olivier de Magny ("Sighs"), France

== Births ==
Death years link to the corresponding "[year] in poetry" article:

- Jean de Sponde (died 1595), French poet, writer, translator and humanist

== Deaths ==
Birth years link to the corresponding "[year] in poetry" article:

- Gutierre de Cetina died about this year (born 1520), Spanish
- Cristovao Falcao died about this year (born 1518), Portuguese
- Hayâlî (خيالى) (born c. 1500) Ottoman
- Jean Salmon Macrin died (born 1490), French, Latin-language poet

== See also ==
- Poetry
- 16th century in poetry
- 16th century in literature
- Dutch Renaissance and Golden Age literature
- French Renaissance literature
- Renaissance literature
- Spanish Renaissance literature
