= 1621 in poetry =

List of years in poetry	(table)
- … 1611; 1612; 1613; 1614; 1615; 1616; 1617; 1618; 1619; 1620; 1621; 1622; 1623; 1624; 1625; 1626; 1627; 1628; 1629; 1630; 1631 …
- In literature 1618 1619 1620 1621 1622 1623 1624
- Art; Archaeology; Architecture; Literature; Music; Philosophy; Science; +...

Nationality words link to articles with information on the nation's poetry or literature (for instance, Irish or France).

== Events ==
- November 22 – English poet John Donne is installed as Dean of St Paul's Cathedral in London.

== Works published ==
=== Great Britain ===
- John Ashmore, translator, Certain Selected Odes of Horace, Englished; and their Arguments Annexed
- Richard Brathwaite:
  - Natures Embassie; or, The Wilde-Mans Measures
  - Times Curtaine Drawne; or, The Anatomie of Vanitie
- Ralph Crane, The Workes of Mercy, Both Corporeal and Spiritual
- Francis Quarles, Hadassa; or, The History of Queene Ester
- George Sandys, The First Five Books of Ovid's Metamorphosis, published anonymously (see also Ovid's Metamorphosis 1626)
- Rachel Speght, Mortalities Memorandum: With a dreame prefixed, imaginarie in manner, reall in matter
- John Taylor:
  - The Praise, Antiquity, and Commodity, of Beggery, Beggers and Begging
  - Superbiae Flagellum; or, The Whip of Pride
- George Wither, The Songs of the Old Testament, verses and music
- Lady Mary Wroth (Sir Philip Sidney's niece), Pamphilia to Amphilanthus, sonnet sequence written since 1613 partially included in The Countess of Montgomery's Urania

=== Other ===
- Théophile de Viau, Œuvres poétiques, France

== Births ==
Death years link to the corresponding "[year] in poetry" article:

- March 31 – Andrew Marvell (died 1678), English metaphysical poet and parliamentarian
- April 17 – Henry Vaughan (died 1695), Welsh poet
- July 8 – Jean de La Fontaine (died 1695), French poet and fable writer
- July 24 – Jan Andrzej Morsztyn (died 1693), Polish poet and member of the noble class Szlachta
- Rupa Bhavani (died 1721), Indian, Kashmiri-language poet
- Jane Cavendish (died 1669), English poet and playwright
- Wacław Potocki (died 1696), Polish nobleman (Szlachta), moralist, poet and writer

== Deaths ==
Birth years link to the corresponding "[year] in poetry" article:

- March 28 – Ottavio Rinuccini (born 1562), Italian poet, courtier, and opera librettist
- August 3 – Guillaume du Vair (born 1556), French writer and poet
- August 15 – John Barclay (born 1582), Scottish satirist and poet
- September 25 – Mary Herbert (born 1561), English poet, translator, patron, hostess of a literary salon, and sister of Philip Sidney
- October 12 – Pierre Matthieu (born 1563), French playwright, poet and historian

== See also ==
- Poetry
- 16th century in poetry
- 16th century in literature
