= 1706 in poetry =

Nationality words link to articles with information on the nation's poetry or literature (for instance, Irish or France).

== Events ==
- May 23 – The Battle of Ramillies, a victory for the British and their allies under John Churchill, 1st Duke of Marlborough, inspires several poets.

== Works published ==
- Joseph Addison, The Campaign, on the victory at Blenheim
- Daniel Baker, The History of Job
- Sir Richard Blackmore, Advice to the Poets, published anonymously
- Stephen Clay, An Epistle from the Elector of Bavaria to the French King: After the Battel of Ramilles, published anonymously; has been misattributed to Matthew Prior
- William Congreve:
  - A Pindarique Ode ... On the Victorious Progress of Her Magesties Arms, Under the Conduct of the Duke of Marlborough
  - Discourse on the Pindarique Ode, in which the author criticized Abraham Cowley's views
- Daniel Defoe:
  - Caledonia
  - Jure Divino, about the divine-right theory of monarchy
- John Dennis, The Battle of Ramilla; or, the Power of Union
- William Harison, Woodstock Park, London : printed for Jacob Tonson
- Nicholas Noyes, "On Cotton Mather's Endeavors Toward the Christian Education of Negro Slaves", English Colonial America
- John Philips:
  - Blenheim
  - Cerealia: An imitation of Milton, published anonymously, also attributed to Elijah Fenton
- Thomas Tickell, Oxford, published anonymously, published this year, although the book states "1707"
- James Watson, editor, A Choice Collection of Comic and Serious Scots Poems both ancient and modern, by several hands, Edinburgh (published this year through 1711)
- Isaac Watts - Horae Lyricae

== Births ==
Death years link to the corresponding "[year] in poetry" article:

- Joseph Green (died 1780, English Colonial American clergyman and poet

== Deaths ==
Birth years link to the corresponding "[year] in poetry" article:

- January 29 – Charles Sackville, 6th Earl of Dorset (born 1638), English poet and courtier
- June – Jacques Testu de Belval (born c. 1626), French ecclesiastic and poet
- November 15 (presumed) – Tsangyang Gyatso, 6th Dalai Lama (died 1683), deposed Buddhist religious leader and Tibetan poet
- December 3 – Emilie Juliane of Schwarzburg-Rudolstadt (born 1637), German countess and hymn writer
- Also:
  - Luo Mu (born 1622), Chinese painter, poet and prose writer
  - John Phillips (born 1631), poet and satirist, brother of Edward Phillips, nephew of John Milton
  - Rahman Baba (born 1632), Indian Pashto poet
  - Susanna Elizabeth Zeidler (born 1657), German

== See also ==
- Poetry
- List of years in poetry
- List of years in literature

== Notes ==
- "A Timeline of English Poetry" Web page of the Representative Poetry Online Web site, University of Toronto
