= Benjamin Senior Godines =

Dutch Jewish engraver

Benjamin Senior Godines was a Dutch Jewish engraver who worked in Amsterdam in the 17th century. His father was Jacob Belmonte; his brother, the poet Moses Belmonte.
