= 1652 in poetry =

| List of years in poetry | (table) |
- … 1642; 1643; 1644; 1645; 1646; 1647; 1648; 1649; 1650; 1651; 1652; 1653; 1654; 1655; 1656; 1657; 1658; 1659; 1660; 1661; 1662 …
- In literature 1649 1650 1651 1652 1653 1654 1655
- Art; Archaeology; Architecture; Literature; Music; Philosophy; Science; +...

Nationality words link to articles with information on the nation's poetry or literature (for instance, Irish or France).

== Events ==
- English poet John Milton loses the last of his eyesight during the year; his first wife Mary (née Powell, 1625) dies on May 5.
- A translation by Saiyid Aidarus of the Arabic religious poem "Hamziya" is the earliest known written example of Swahili literature.

== Works published ==
- Edward Benlowes, Theophila; or, Loves Sacrifice, including some Latin poetry and translations
- Richard Crashaw, Carmen Deo Nostro, Te Decet Hymnus: Sacred poems, containing poems from Steps to the Temple 1646, and new poetry
- Sir Richard Fanshawe, Selected Parts of Horace, Prince of Lyricks, published anonymously; Latin and English verse on facing pages
- John Hall, translator, Of the Height of Eloquence by Longinus (a work now known in English as On the Sublime)
- John Phillips published a Latin reply to the anonymous attack on John Milton entitled Pro Rege et populo anglicano

== Works incorrectly dated this year ==
- Anonymous, A Hermeticall Banquet, published in 1651, according to The Concise Oxford Chronology of English Literature, although the book states "1652"; some attribute the book to James Howell, others to Thomas Vaughan

== Births ==
Death years link to the corresponding "[year] in poetry" article:

- May - Jane Barker (died 1732), English poet and playwright
- Hanabusa Itchō (died 1724), Japanese painter, calligrapher, and haiku poet
- Nahum Tate (died 1715), Irish poet
- Probable date - Vemana (died 1730), Telugu poet

== Deaths ==
Birth years link to the corresponding "[year] in poetry" article:

- April 12 - John Vicars (born 1582), English contemporary biographer, poet and polemicist of the English Civil War
- May - Claude de L'Estoile (born 1602), French playwright and poet
- June 25 - Abraham von Franckenberg (born 1593), German mystic, author, poet and hymn-writer
- October 20 - Antonio Coello (born 1611), Spanish dramatist and poet
- November 21 - Jan Brożek (born 1585), Polish mathematician, astronomer, physician, poet, writer, musician and rector
- Tadhg mac Dáire Mac Bruaideadha (born 1570), Irish Gaelic poet and historian, killed
- Wang Duo (born 1592), Chinese calligrapher, painter and poet
- Approximate date - Brian Mac Giolla Phádraig (born 1580), Irish Gaelic scholar and poet, killed

== See also ==
- Poetry
- 17th century in poetry
- 17th century in literature
