= 1595 in poetry =

This article covers 1595 in poetry. Nationality words link to articles with information on the nation's poetry or literature (for instance, Irish or France).

== Works published ==
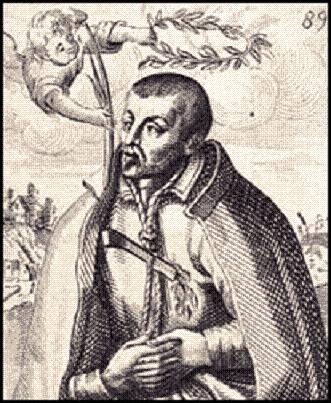
Saint Robert Southwell, S.J., executed this year; illustration from the frontispiece of Saint Peters Complaint, first published this year

=== Great Britain ===
- Anonymous, The Fissher-Mans Tale, verse paraphrase of Robert Greene's Pandosto 1588
- William Alabaster, Roxana, tragædia (approximate date)
- Barnabe Barnes, A Divine Centurie of Spirituall Sonnets
- Richard Barnfield, Cynthia
- Nicholas Breton, Marie Magdalens Love; A Solemne Passion of the Soules Love
- Thomas Campion, Poemata
- George Chapman, published anonymously, Ovids Banquet of Sence, allegorical recounting of Ovid's courtship of Corinna
- Thomas Churchyard, A Musicall Consort of Heavenly Harmonie (Compounded Out of Manie Parts of Musicke) Called Churchyyards Charitie
- Samuel Daniel, The First Fowre Bookes of the Civile Warres Betweene the Two Houses of Lancaster and Yorke (a fifth book later appeared without a title page or a date; see also Poeticall Essayes 1599, Works 1601 (six books), and Civile Warres 1609, the first complete edition, in eight books)
- Michael Drayton - Endimion & Phoebe
- Thomas Edwards, Cephalus and Procris, Narcissus
- Stephen Gosson, Pleasant Quippes for Upstart New-fangled Gentlewomen, published anonymously but ascribed to Gosson, a coarse satiric poem
- Thomas Lodge, A Fig for Momus, verse satires
- Gervase Markham, The Poem of Poems, or Syon's Muse
- Thomas Morley, editor, First Book of Ballets in Five Voices
- George Peele, playwright, The Old Wives' Tale (play) printed
- Francis Sabie, The Fisher-mans Tale: Of the famous Actes, Life, and Loue of Cassander, a Grecian Knight
- Sir Philip Sidney, An Apology for Poetry, English criticism (written between 1580–1583; published for the first time posthumously)
- Saint Robert Southwell:
  - Moeniae
  - Saint Peters Complaint, with Other Poemes, published anonymously; three editions this year; it is possible there were several manuscripts in circulation before the first printed edition appeared (see also S. Peters Complaint 1616)
- Edmund Spenser:
  - Amoretti and Epithalamion
  - Colin Clouts Come Home Againe, includes "Astrophel: A pastorall elegie upon the death of Sidney", and other laments on the death of Sidney by Sir Walter Ralegh and others

=== Other ===
- Luís de Camões, Rimas, Portugal

== Births ==
Death years link to the corresponding "[year] in poetry" article:

- December 4 – Jean Chapelain (died 1674), French poet and writer
- Also:
  - Thomas Carew (died 1640), English poet
  - Jean Desmarets de Saint-Sorlin (died 1676), French poet and playwright
  - Bihari Lal (died 1663), Hindi poet, wrote the Satasaī (Seven Hundred Verses)
  - Francesco Pona (died 1655), Italian doctor, philosopher, Marinist poet and writer
  - Maciej Kazimierz Sarbiewski (died 1640), Polish Jesuit and Latin-language poet
  - Robert Sempill the younger (died c.1663), Scottish poet

== Deaths ==
Birth years link to the corresponding "[year] in poetry" article:

- February 21 – Saint Robert Southwell (born c. 1561), English poet and Catholic martyr; executed as a traitor
- March 18 – Jean de Sponde (born 1557), French poet, writer, translator and humanist
- April 25 – Torquato Tasso (born 1544), Italian
- May 25 – Valens Acidalius (born 1567), German, Latin-language poet and critic
- October 15 – Faizi (born 1547), Indian poet laureate of the Emperor Akbar
- November 5 – Luis Barahona de Soto (born 1548), Spanish
- Also:
  - Meurig Dafydd (born c. 1510), Welsh bard
  - Thomas Edwards (born unknown), English author of two Ovid inspired epic poems Cephalus and Procris and Narcissus

== See also ==
- Poetry
- 16th century in poetry
- 16th century in literature
- Dutch Renaissance and Golden Age literature
- Elizabethan literature
- English Madrigal School
- French Renaissance literature
- Renaissance literature
- Spanish Renaissance literature
- University Wits
