= De Gestis Mendi de Saa =

Poem by José de Anchieta

- by José de Anchieta
- Written: ca. 1560
- Country: Brazil
- Language: Latin
- Subject(s): Mem de Sá

De Gestis Mendi de Saa is a poem written about 1560 by José de Anchieta, a 16th-century Spanish Jesuit missionary in the Portuguese colony of Brazil, who was called the "Apostle of Brazil." The poem describes the "heroic deeds" of the Portuguese governor Mem de Sá and his soldiers "fighting in the immense wilderness" and against the French Protestants.

The wars referred to were actually aimed at the systematic conquest and destruction of Tupi villages and fields and the enslaving of their inhabitants, as a means of "putting an end to cannibalism" and facilitating their Christianization. Anchieta and his fellow-Jesuit Manuel da Nóbrega supported and actively promoted that aggressive policy.

== See also ==
- 1560 in poetry
