= Moses Belmonte =

Spanish poet and translator

Moses Belmonte (1619 – 29 May 1647 in Amsterdam) was a poet and translator, the eighth child of Jacob Belmonte, also known as Jacob Israel Belmonte. He was a pupil of Saul Levi Morteira, whose sermons (Gib'at Sha'ul, 1645) he edited together with Benjamin Diaz. His poem "Argumenta Contra os Noserim" has been reprinted by De Castro in his Keur van Grafsteenen. Belmonte translated the Song of Songs into Spanish. It was published in Hebrew characters in several editions of the Bible printed at Venice; then in Amsterdam, 1644, under the title Paraphrasis Caldaica en los Cantares de Selomo con el Texto; Traduzida en Lengua Española. He also translated the Pirqe Abot into Spanish (Perakym, Amsterdam, 1644).

Belmonte founded the Gemilut Chasadim society in 1639.

His brother was the engraver Benjamin Senior Godines.
