= Henry Hutton =

Australian cricketer

Personal information
- Born: 26 August 1878; Masterton, Wellington, New Zealand
- Died: 13 August 1968 (aged 89); Norwood, South Australia
- Source: Cricinfo, 9 August 2020

Henry Hutton (26 August 1878 – 13 August 1968) was an Australian cricketer. He played in one first-class match for South Australia in 1905/06.

== See also ==
- List of South Australian representative cricketers
