= John Ashmore (translator) =

John Ashmore (fl. 1621), was the first who attempted a translation into English of selected odes of Horace.

In 1621 he published 'Certain selected Odes of Horace Englished, and their Arguments annexed.' To the translations are added a number of epigrams and anagrams. Samuel Pullein, in a copy of Latin elegiacs prefixed to the translations, is enthusiastic about his friend's achievement:— Flaccus adest, eadem mens est et earminis idem/Sensus: forma eadem est ingeniique decus.

Many of the epigrams and anagrams are addressed to distinguished personages, such as Charles, Prince of Wales, George Villiers, Marquis of Buckingham, and Sir Francis Bacon. In others the writer puns on the names of private friends. One epigram is addressed 'Ad insignem Poetam, D. Ben. Johnson.' From many references throughout the book to the Fairfaxes and others, it appears that the author was a native of Ripon in Yorkshire.
