= Henry Adamson =

Scottish poet and historian

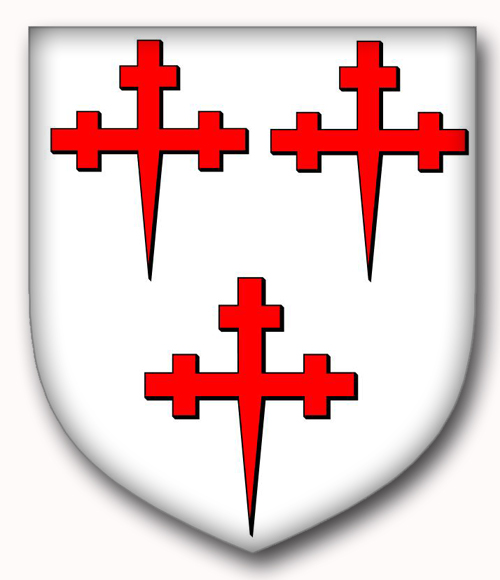
Henry Adamson's family coat of arms

Henry Adamson (1581–1637) was a Scottish poet and historian.

Adamson was the son of James Adamson, Dean of the Merchant Guildry and Provost of Perth, Scotland, baptised on 11 November 1581. He set out to train as a priest, after his uncle Patrick Adamson, but instead became a schoolmaster in his home city. He died before July 1637.

His friend William Drummond encouraged the publication of his most famous poem: Muses Threnodie: of Mirthful Mournings on the death of Mr Gall, (Edinburgh 1638 – see 1638 in poetry). The poem is an important document for its general account of Perth in the seventeenth century. Adamson is credited with first using the word curling in 1620. He related that his friend, Mr Gall, "a citizen of Perth, and a gentle-man of goodly stature, and pregnant wit, much given to pastime, as golf, archerie, curling and jovial companie". It also records the playing of golf on the South Inch:

And ye, my clubs must no more prepare
To make your balls flee whistling through the air

It is also particularly noted for its observation of rosicrucianism, freemasonry and second sight. Referring to the rebuilding of a bridge over the River Tay, swept away in 1621, Adamson wrote:

Thus Mr Gall assured it would be so
And my good genius doth surely know:
For what we do presage is not in grosse
For we be brethren of the Rosie Crosse;
We have the Mason word, and second sight,
Things for to come we can foretell aright.

— The muses threnodie, or, mirthfull mournings, on the death of Master Gall. Containing varietie of pleasant poëticall descriptions, morall instructions, historiall narrations, and divine observations, with the most remarkable antiquities of Scotland, especially at Perth by Henry Adamson, King James College, Edinburgh, 1638
