= 1609 in poetry =

List of years in poetry	(table)
- … 1599; 1600; 1601; 1602; 1603; 1604; 1605; 1606; 1607; 1608; 1609; 1610; 1611; 1612; 1613; 1614; 1615; 1616; 1617; 1618; 1619 …
- In literature 1606 1607 1608 1609 1610 1611 1612
- Art; Archaeology; Architecture; Literature; Music; Philosophy; Science; +...

Nor shall Death brag thou wander'st in his shade,

When in eternal lines to time thou grow'st:

So long as men can breathe or eyes can see,
So long lives this, and this gives life to thee.

— Last lines from William Shakespeare's Sonnet 18, published this year and, four centuries later, still "eternal lines"

Nationality words link to articles with information on the nation's poetry or literature (for instance, Irish or France).

== Events ==
- May 20 – London publisher Thomas Thorpe issues Shake-speares Sonnets, with a dedication to "Mr. W.H.", and the poem A Lover's Complaint appended; it is uncertain whether this publication has Shakespeare's authority.
- October 12 – A version of the rhyme "Three Blind Mice" is published in Deuteromelia or The Seconde part of Musicks melodie (London). The editor, and possible author of the verse, is the teenage Thomas Ravenscroft.

== Works in English ==
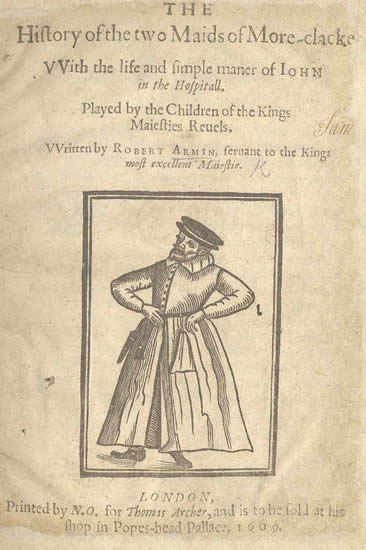
Title page of Robert Armin's The History of the two Maids of More-Clacke. The woodcut shows Armin onstage.

- Robert Armin:
  - The Italian Taylor, and his Boy
  - The History of the Two Maids of More-clacke
- George Chapman, Homer Prince of Poets, translation of Homer's Iliad, published about this year
- Samuel Daniel completes the eighth and last book of his epic poem, The Civile Wars Betweene the Howses of Lancaster and Yorke Corrected and Continued (also known as Civil Wars)
- John Davies:
  - The Holy Roode; or, Christs Crosse
  - Humours Heav'n on Earth: With the civile warres of death and fortune
- Thomas Heywood, Troia Britanica; or, Great Britaines Troy, translated in part from Ovid
- Gervase Markham, The Famous Whore, or Noble Curtizan, based on Joachim Du Bellay's La vielle courtisane
- Samuel Rowlands, A Whole Crew of Kind Gossips, published anonymously, includes "Tis Merrie When Gossips Meete" (1602)
- William Shakespeare, Shake-speares Sonnets
- Edmund Spenser, Two Cantos of Mutabilitie published together with a reprint of The Fairie Queene
- John Wilbye, The Second Set of Madrigales

== Works published in other languages ==
- Luis Belmonte Bermúdez, Vida del Padre Maestro Ignacio de Loyola ("Life of Father Ignatius of Loyola"), an epic poem on the saint's life Spain
- Marc Lescarbot, Les Muses de la Nouvelle-France, French Canada

== Births ==
- February 10 – John Suckling (died 1642), English
- August 19 – Jean Rotrou (died 1650), French poet and tragedian
- October 5 – Paul Fleming (died 1640), German

== Deaths ==
- March 9 – William Warner (born c. 1558), English
- December 4 – Alexander Hume (born c. 1560), Scottish
- December – Barnabe Barnes (born c. 1571) English
- date not known
  - Anthony Copley (born 1567), English Catholic poet and conspirator
  - Kanaka Dasa (born 1509), Karnatakan poet, philosopher, musician and composer
