= 1560 in literature =

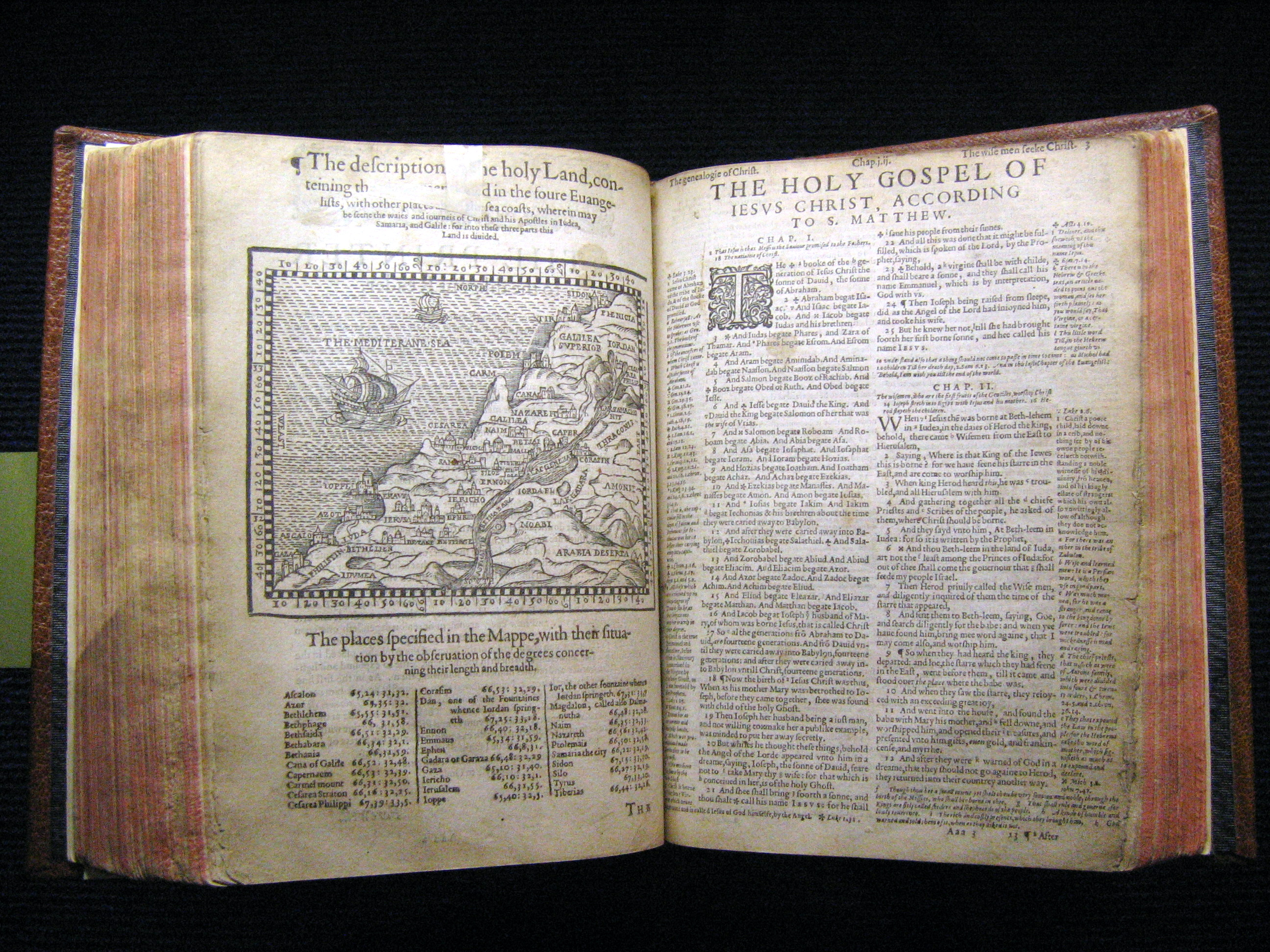
Geneva Bible

This article contains information about the literary events and publications of 1560.

== Events ==
- August 27 – The Parliament of Scotland approves the Scots Confession of faith.
- unknown date – Paolo Veronese completes his work on the interior decoration of the Biblioteca Marciana in Venice.

== New books ==
=== Prose ===
- Geneva Bible (first full edition)
- Giachem Bifrun (translator) – L'g Nuof Sainc Testamaint da nos Signer Jesu Christ (New Testament in Putèr variety of Romansh language)s
- Thomas Churchyard – The Contention bettwyxte Churchyeard and Camell, upon David Dycers Dreame
- Scots Confession, officially The Confession of Faith of the Kirk of Scotland, etc.

=== Drama ===
- Jacques Grévin – Jules César
- Thomas Preston – Cambises (possible date of first performance)

=== Poetry ===
- See 1560 in poetry

== Births ==
- January 5 – John Bois, English Bible translator (died 1643)
- Baptised August 4 – Sir John Harington, English courtier, poet and inventor (died 1612)
- October 10 – Jacobus Arminius, Dutch theologian (died 1609)
- December 3 – Jan Gruter, Netherlandish critic and scholar (died 1627)
- Unknown dates
  - Constantino Cajetan, Italian ecclesiastical historian (died 1650)
  - Álvarez de Paz, Spanish Jesuit theologian (died 1620)
  - Mark Ridley, English lexicographer of Russian and physician (died in or before 1624)
- probable
  - Heinrich Khunrath, German hermetic philosopher writing in Latin (died 1605)
  - Anthony Munday, English dramatist and miscellanist (died 1633)

== Deaths ==
- January 1 – Joachim du Bellay, French poet (born c. 1522)
- April 7 – Robert Céneau, French bishop and historian (born 1483)
- April 19 – Philipp Melanchthon, German Protestant theologian (born 1497)
- July 9 – John Slotanus, Dutch Catholic polemical writer (date of birth unknown)
- September 30 – Melchior Cano, Spanish theologian (born c. 1509)
- November 15 – Domingo de Soto, Spanish theologian (born 1494)
- December 21 – Georg Thym, German poet (born c. 1520)
