= Charles Aleyn =

Poet

Charles Aleyn (died about 1640), a historical poet in the reign of Charles I, was of Sidney Sussex College, Cambridge; became usher to the celebrated Thomas Farnaby, at his school, in Goldsmith's Rents, and afterwards tutor to Sir Edward Sherburne, himself a poet. He died about 1640.

Aleyn seems to have been much esteemed and beloved by contemporaries of some eminence. To his first poem are prefixed commendatory verses in Latin, by Thomas May, and in English, by John Hall and Henry Blount; Sherburne and Edward Prideaux lent their names to the second. The poems are composed in stanzas of six lines—four alternate and two rhymes.

== Works ==
His works include the following.

- The Battle of Crescey and Poictiers (1632)
- The Historie of Hen. VII. with the famed battle near Bosworth, (1638)
- The Historie of Eurialus and Lucretia (1639), from a story in the Latin Epistles of Æneas Sylvius.
