= 1582 in poetry =

This article covers 1582 in poetry. Nationality words link to articles with information on the nation's poetry or literature (for instance, Irish or France).

== Works published ==
=== Great Britain ===
- Philip Sidney (attributed), Astrophil and Stella
- Richard Stanyhurst, The First Foure Bookes of Virgil his Aneis
- Thomas Watson, Hecatompathia; or, Passionate Centurie of Love

=== Other ===
- Lodovico Castelvetro, Le rime del Petrarca breuemente sposte per Lodouico Castelvetro, Basle: Pietro de Sedabonis; Italian commentary on Petrarch, posthumous
- Philippe Desportes, an edition of his works; France
- Fernando de Herrera, Algunas obras de Fernando de Herrera, Spain

== Births ==
- January 28 - John Barclay, Scottish satirist and poet (died 1621)
- April 8 (bapt.) - Phineas Fletcher (died 1650), English
- November 21 - François Maynard (died 1646), French
- Late - Juan de Tassis, 2nd Count of Villamediana (died 1622), Spanish
- Also:
  - Richard Corbet (died 1635), English poet and bishop
  - Francesc Vicent Garcia (died 1623), Catalan poet
  - Giovanni Valentini (died 1649), Italian Baroque composer, poet and keyboard virtuoso
  - John Vicars (died 1652), English contemporary biographer, poet and polemicist of the English Civil War
- Possible date - Nef'i (executed 1635), Ottoman Turkish poet and satirist

== Deaths ==
- July/August - Jacques Pelletier du Mans (born 1517), French humanist poet
- September 28 - George Buchanan (born 1506), Scottish historian, scholar, humanist and poet
- Arnoldus Arlenius (born 1510), Dutch humanist philosopher and poet
- Tashcali Yahya Bey, Ottoman Turkish poet
- Natalis Comes (born 1520), Italian mythographer, poet and historian
- Adam Reusner died sometime between 1563 and this year (born sometime from 1471 to 1496), German
- 1582/1585: Pir Roshan (born 1525), Pashtun warrior poet and intellectual who wrote in Persian and Arabic
- 1582/1583: Alexander Scott (born 1520), Scottish

== See also ==
- Poetry
- 16th century in poetry
- 16th century in literature
- Dutch Renaissance and Golden Age literature
- Elizabethan literature
- French Renaissance literature
- Renaissance literature
- Spanish Renaissance literature
- University Wits
