= 1581 in poetry =

Nationality words link to articles with information on the nation's poetry or literature (for instance, Irish or France).

== Events ==
- Italian poet Torquato Tasso's epic poem Jerusalem Delivered (La Gerusalemme liberata) is first published complete, a pirated edition printed in Parma being followed by an authorized edition from Ferrara, where the poet is confined in the Ospedale di Sant'Anna. Also this year, Aldus Manutius the Younger prints a selection of Tasso's lyrics and prose in Venice.

== Works published ==
=== Great Britain ===
- Anonymous, A Triumph for True Subjects, and a Terrour unto al Tratiours, ballad on the execution of Edmund Campion on December 1, 1561, attributed to William Elderton, who was likely not the author
- Sir Philip Sidney, An Apology for Poetry

=== Other ===
- Marie de Romieu, Premières Œuvres poetiques de MaDamoiselle Marie de Romieu Vivaroise, France
- Philippe Desportes, an edition of his works; France
- Torquato Tasso, Jerusalem Delivered (La Gerusalemme liberata), Italy

== Births ==
- March 16 – Pieter Corneliszoon Hooft (died 1647), Dutch historian, poet and playwright
- Also:
  - Henry Adamson (died 1637), Scottish poet and historian
  - Hieronim Morsztyn (died 1623), Polish poet
  - Sir Thomas Overbury (murdered 1613), English poet and essayist
  - Lucy Russell, Countess of Bedford (died 1627), English countess, minor poet and major patron of poets

== Deaths ==
- Hywel ap Syr Mathew (born unknown), Welsh poet, genealogist and soldier
- Paul Speratus died (born 1484), German
- Mikolaj Sep Szarzynski died (born c. 1550), Polish
- Surdas, died sometime from this year to 1584 (born 1478 or 1479), Indian, Hindi poet and saint who wrote in the Brij Bhasha dialect

== See also ==
- Poetry
- 16th century in poetry
- 16th century in literature
- Dutch Renaissance and Golden Age literature
- Elizabethan literature
- French Renaissance literature
- Renaissance literature
- Spanish Renaissance literature
- University Wits
