= 1569 in poetry =

This article covers 1569 in poetry. Nationality words link to articles with information on the nation's poetry or literature (for instance, Irish or France).

== Works published ==
- Stephen Bateman, The Travayled Pylgrime, translated from Olivier de la Marche's Le chevalier delibere
- Alonso de Ercilla, La Araucana, an epic poem about the conquest of Chile; the first part was published this year, the second in 1578, when it was published with the first part; the third part was published with the first and second parts in 1589' Spain
- Barnabe Googe, The Ship of Safeguard
- Jan van der Noot, A theatre for Worldlings, including poems translated into English by Edmund Spenser from French sources, published by Henry Bynneman in London
- Thomas Underdowne, published anonymously, a translation from Latin, Ovid his Invective against Ibis

== Births ==
Death years link to the corresponding "[year] in poetry" article:

- April 16 – Sir John Davies (died 1626), English poet and lawyer, attorney general in Ireland; not to be confused with his contemporary, John Davies of Hereford (c. 1565–1618)
- September 5 – Georg Friedrich of Hohenlohe-Neuenstein-Weikersheim (died 1645), German officer and amateur poet
- October 18 – Giambattista Marino (died 1625), Italian poet famous for his long epic L'Adone
- Also:
  - Ján Bocatius (died 1621), Slovak
  - Barnabe Barnes birth year uncertain, possibly 1568 or 1571 (when baptised) (died 1609), English
  - Arthur Gorges (died 1625), English poet, translator and courtier
  - Geoffrey Keating (Seathrún Céitinn) (died 1644), Irish Roman Catholic priest, poet and historian
  - Emilia Lanier, also spelled "Aemilia Lanyer" (died 1645), English
  - Thomas Seget (died 1627), Scottish poet writing in Latin
  - Zhu Wuxia, flourished this year, Chinese woman poet

== Deaths ==
Birth years link to the corresponding "[year] in poetry" article:

- September 5 – Bernardo Tasso (born 1493), Italian
- Between September 8 and October 5 – Mikołaj Rej (born 1505), Polish
- September 11 – Vincenza Armani (born c. 1530), Italian
- October 7 – Guillaume Guéroult (born c. 1507), French editor, translator and poet
- November 29 – António Ferreira (born 1528), Portuguese
- date not known – Huang O (born 1498), Chinese poet, a woman

== See also ==
- Poetry
- 16th century in poetry
- 16th century in literature
- Dutch Renaissance and Golden Age literature
- Elizabethan literature
- French Renaissance literature
- Renaissance literature
- Spanish Renaissance literature
