= Thomas May =

English poet, dramatist and historian (1594/5–1650)

Thomas May (1594/95 – 13 November 1650) was an English poet, dramatist and historian of the Renaissance era.

== Early life and career until 1630 ==
May was born in Mayfield, Sussex, the son of Sir Thomas May, a minor courtier. He matriculated at Sidney Sussex, Cambridge, graduating B.A. in 1613. He wrote his first published poem while at Cambridge, an untitled three-stanza contribution to the University's memorial collection of poems on the death of Henry Prince of Wales in 1612. Although the majority of this volume's poems are in Latin, May's (along with a few others) is in English. It uses the trope of Pythagorean transmigration, which he re-employs in later works.

=== Acquaintance with Carew, Massinger and Jonson ===
In 1615 May registered as a lawyer at Gray's Inn in London. There is no record of what he did for the next five years.

During the 1620s May was associated with dramatic circles. In 1620 his romantic comedy, The Heir, was performed by the Players of the Revels. Although this company usually performed at the rowdy, open-air Red Bull Theatre, May's play was first performed privately (according to its only published edition), and is tonally ill-suited to a plebeian city audience. During the early 1620s May befriended the courtier, poet and diplomat Thomas Carew, who contributed a poem to the published text of The Heir in 1622, and probably also Philip Massinger. Massinger wrote at least one play for the short-lived Revels company (The Virgin Martyr, with Thomas Dekker) and shared May's generally Roman interests. In 1629 May wrote a commendatory poem for Massinger's The Roman Actor, describing him as his 'very deserving friend'. May knew Ben Jonson personally by the late 1620s, if not earlier.

In 1625 May was responsible for the verse translations in Kingsmill Long's translation of William Barclay's Arcadian political allegory.

=== Bellum Civile translation ===
May's career-defining work was his translation of the Latin poet Lucan's Bellum Civile. Lucan's is a narrative of the downfall of the Roman Republic in the civil wars between Pompey and Julius Caesar: it laments the loss of republican liberty and institutions and condemns Caesar's immoral ambition. The first three books of May's translation appeared in 1626 and the full ten a year later (with different printers); it was reprinted in 1631, 1635 and 1650, each time with minor corrections. The 1627 edition boasted dedications of Books II to IX to prominent English noblemen, many of whom were actual or suspected opponents of Charles I's ongoing attempts to tax without Parliament. The overall work was dedicated to William, 2nd Earl of Devonshire. May compares the fortitude and patriotism of these aristocrats to the patrician heroes of Lucan's doomed republic. These dedications disappear from later editions and there is some evidence they were defaced or removed, possibly by censors.

In June 1627 May composed a poem celebrating Charles I as absolute ruler of the seas, probably as part of the upswell of support for the Isle de Rhé expedition. It re-uses the Pythagorean trope May first employed in his poem of 1612.

=== Other works and translations ===
1626 also saw the performance of May's tragedy Cleopatra, although it isn't known where or by whom; it was printed later in 1639. A manuscript version in the British Library, of uncertain date, contains a number of small but interesting textual variants. During the next few years he wrote two further classical tragedies, Antigone (published 1631) and Julia Agrippina (1639); the first was probably never staged but the second claims a 1628 performance on its title page. May's tragedies are modelled on Jonson and are also plausibly influenced by Massinger; they concentrate on political themes, rather than erotic passions; Cleopatra and Antigone draw linguistically and thematically on Lucan.

During the later 1620s May also published two further translations of Latin poetry: Virgil's Georgics (1628) and a selection from the Epigrams of Martial (1629). The latter hints at biographical content, highlighting Martial's poverty and his decision to abandon a legal career for poetry. Neither work was republished.

== May in the 1630s ==
Until 1630 May seems to have lacked much reward or recognition for his literary efforts. None of the dedicatees to his early works, including the eight titled nobles addressed in his 1627 translation of Lucan, can be connected to his later activities. In dedicating his Georgics May even turned to a fellow alumnus of his old college, Sir Christopher Gardiner, a well-known Catholic philanderer who left shortly afterwards for the New World – hardly the best prospective patron.

=== Continuation ===
May's fortunes probably improved towards the end of the decade. In 1630 a seven-book Continuation of Lucan appeared, in which May took the narrative up to Caesar's assassination in March 44 BC; it was republished in 1633 and 1650. This work may have led to May developing an appetite for historical poetry. He wrote works on Henry II and Edward III during the next five years, each also in seven-book form. All three works were aimed at and seemingly well received at court: they were dedicated to Charles I, probably with the king's encouragement. It was later claimed that May was paid for these efforts. A story also survives of Charles intervening to prevent May being struck by a nobleman at a court entertainment. That said, May did not find regular employment at court and, with the exception of Carew, doesn't seem to have been acquainted with the band of amorous, courtly Cavalier poets. This may have been in part due to a lack of shared interests: unlike the Cavaliers, May had no obvious interest in love poetry (no examples by him survive) or indeed erotic themes in general. If he wrote any significant court entertainments, they have perished.

=== May and Ben Jonson ===
May did have acquaintances. After the Restoration the then Earl of Clarendon, Edward Hyde, recorded that before the Civil War he and May had belonged to a close-knit circle of lawyers and writers grouped around the heavyweight figure of Ben Jonson. This group seems to have been closer and more serious than the 'tribe of Ben', a group of writers who simply styled themselves on Jonson without necessarily knowing him well. According to Hyde, the grouping also contained Carew, John Selden, the lawyer John Vaughan (who was later one of Selden's executors), Charles Cotton and the courtier Sir Kenelme Digby. There is some difficulty in identifying exactly when this circle was in operation, but it probably began during the 1620s: both Vaughan and Jonson wrote dedicatory poems to May's translation of Lucan, and as we have seen Carew was friendly with May by 1622.

Together with Jonson (and probably because of him) May became intimate with Sir Kenelme Digby, later Jonson's literary executor and sponsor of his 1640 Folio Works. Jonson and May were the first two poets in a manuscript collection of poems commemorating the unfortunate death of Digby's wife, Venetia, in 1633. Their shared poetic concerns also surface in a short treatise written by Digby on Edmund Spenser (Elizabethan author of The Faerie Queene), apparently at May's request. This work talks of Jonson as Spenser's literary heir. May complimented Digby for his Spenserian criticism in an effusive sonnet, and later dedicated the published version of Cleopatra to him.

Jonson died in 1637 and the following year May contributed an elegy to the memorial collection Jonsonius Virbius: it began by comparing Jonson to Lucan. During the 1640s a story arose that May had expected to be given Jonson's royal pension, and became disaffected when it passed instead to William Davenant. This story was designed to paint May as an ingrate, and reflects less what he did or thought at the time than his later activities as a writer for the Parliamentary cause.

A comedy of May's, The Old Couple, later published in 1658, claims to have been performed in 1636.

== The 1640s: May and Parliament ==
In 1640 May published a Latin adaptation and translation of his Continuation of Lucan, the Supplementum Lucani. Befitting a major work of Neo-Latin poetry it was published in Leiden, one of the centres of continental humanist scholarship, and received dedications from a number of Dutch intellectuals including Marcus Zuerius van Boxhorn and Nicolaus Heinsius. Letters from Heinsius's father Daniel to Patrick Young, the Royal Librarian, and John Selden indicate that May wrote the translation while in the Netherlands (on what business is unclear). It retained the Continuation's dedication to Charles I, although it has plausibly been argued that it expresses greater hostility to Caesar and monarchy than the original.

=== Parliamentarian views ===
During the early 1640s – it is unclear when – May gravitated towards support for Parliament. In 1642, he wrote a tract supporting brief but regular meetings between King and Parliament, probably to agitate for the Triennial Act 1640, which was much republished. It contained harsh criticism of princes (like Charles I) who had sought to rule without consulting Parliament, but also warned against allowing the people too much responsibility, equating popular government with damaging innovation and turbulence. May emerges in this work, his only explicit statement of political analysis or belief, as a cautious and conservative thinker, distrustful of awarding too much power to any one body, and therefore implicitly a constitutionalist Parliamentarian. This stance was shared by other members of the former Jonson circle, such as Hyde or Vaughan, until late 1642: both had participated in early reforms such as the Bill of attainder of Strafford before switching sides (Hyde) or retiring to his Welsh estates (Vaughan). Another ex-Jonsonian, John Selden, remained a moderate and respected Parliamentarian until his death in the early 1650s.

=== History of the Parliament and the Breviarium ===
As a result of his early pamphleteering, May was commissioned by the House of Commons to compose a History of the Parliament, which appeared in 1647 in Folio. A shining example of rhetorical humanist historiography, complete with plentiful classical citations (especially from Lucan), May presented recent English history as the wrecking of a peaceful and prosperous Elizabethan polity by the greed and stupidity of the Stuarts.

In October 1649, following the regicide and the emergence of an English republican government, May contributed a dedicatory epistle to Charles Sydenham's attack on the Leveller John Lilburne, addressing the members of the Rump Parliament, Roman style, as 'Senators'. May's epistle counsels against legislating for greater freedom of conscience, arguing that it is alienating the regime from potential allies such as the Presbyterians. He dismisses Lilburne and fellow democratic agitators for having no landed interest in the kingdom (echoing the position taken up by Ireton in the Putney Debates of 1647) and warns MPs to heed the 'better sort'. The regicide and subsequent events are hailed as miracles of God.

In 1650 May published a revised history of Parliament eschewing (for the most part) classical citations and other rhetorical adornments in favour of a curt, Sallustian Latin prose style. First published in Latin in April 1650, the Breviarium was swiftly rendered into English, presumably by May himself, as the Breviarie; it appeared in June 1650.

In November 1650 May died. Royalist propaganda later held he had suffocated on the strings of his sleeping bonnet after a heavy drinking binge, but there is no particular reason to believe this: he was already fifty-five. The republicans Henry Marten and Thomas Chaloner were charged by the Council of State with seeing to May's 'burial', setting aside £100 for the purpose, and both men and Sir James Harrington with finding a replacement historian of Parliament. May was interred in Westminster Abbey, his epitaph (supposedly written by the journalist Marchamont Needham) saluting him as the 'defender of the English commonwealth [Vindex Reip. Anglicae]'. In later writings Nedham claims to have known May as a friend. After the Restoration his remains were exhumed and buried in a pit in the yard of St Margaret's, Westminster. May's change of side made him many bitter enemies, and he is the object of scathing condemnation from many of his contemporaries.
