= 1580 in poetry =

This article covers 1580 in poetry. Nationality words link to articles with information on the nation's poetry or literature (for instance, Irish or France).

== Works published ==
=== Great Britain ===
- Anonymous, The Buik of Alexander, publication year uncertain, written in Middle Scots in 1438; erroneously attributed to John Barbour, a close translation of two French original works from the Middle Ages
- George Buchanan, Paraphrasis psalmorum Davidis, in Latin
- Thomas Churchyard, A Pleasaunte Laborinth Called Churchyardes Chance
- Humphrey Gifford, A Poste of Gilloflowrs, prose and poetry; Part 1 translated from Italian and French; Part 2 in verse
- Anthony Munday, The Paine of Pleasure

=== Other ===
- Fernando de Herrera, Anotaciones, criticism, Spain
- Philippe Desportes, an edition of his works; France
- Jan Kochanowski, Laments (Treny) ("Thredonies"), Poland
- Torquato Tasso, Jerusalem Delivered (La Gerusalemme liberata), 14 cantos in pirated edition, Italy

== Births ==
- April 18 – Thomas Middleton, English (died 1627) English playwright and poet
- June 9 – Daniël Heinsius (died 1655), Dutch scholar writing Latin and Dutch poetry
- September 14 – Francisco de Quevedo (died 1645), nobleman, politician and one of the most prominent Spanish poets of the age
- October 12 – Hortensio Félix Paravicino (died 1633), Spanish preacher and poet
- November 9 – Johannes Narssius (died 1637), Dutch-born New Latin poet, physician and Remonstrant minister
- Also:
  - Brian Mac Giolla Phádraig (died 1652), Irish Gaelic scholar and poet
  - Thomas Ford (died 1648), English composer, lutenist, viol player and poet
  - Francisco Rodrigues Lobo (died 1621), Portuguese poet and bucolic writer
  - Daniel Pribiš (died 1645), Slovak
  - Francisco Rodrigues Lobo, born about this year (died 1622), Portuguese
  - John Webster (died 1634), English Jacobean dramatist and poet

== Deaths ==
- June 10 – Luís de Camões, sometimes rendered in English as "Luis de Camoens", died (born about 1524), perhaps the most highly regarded Portuguese poet
- June 22 – Hernando de Acuna died (born c. 1520), Spanish
- Also:
  - Shlomo Halevi Alkabetz (born 1500), Greek kabbalist and poet
  - Wu Cheng'en died 1580 or 1582 (born 1500 or 1505), Chinese novelist and poet of the Ming Dynasty
  - Robin Clidro (born 1545), Welsh language poet and itinerant poet
  - Sebastián de Horozco (born 1510), Spanish poet and playwright
  - Thomas Tusser (born 1524), English

== See also ==
- Poetry
- 16th century in poetry
- 16th century in literature
- Dutch Renaissance and Golden Age literature
- Elizabethan literature
- French Renaissance literature
- Renaissance literature
- Spanish Renaissance literature
- University Wits
