= 1622 in poetry =

This article covers 1622 in poetry. Nationality words link to articles with information on the nation's poetry or literature (for instance, Irish or France).

== Works published ==
=== Great Britain ===
- Robert Aylet:
  - Peace with Her Foure Garders: Five morall meditations
  - Thrifts Equipage: Five divine and morall meditations
- Sir John Davies, Nosce Teipsum (see also Nosce Teipsum 1599, 1619)
- Michael Drayton, The Second Part, or a Continuance of Poly-Olbion from the Eighteenth Song (see Poly-Olbion, Part 1, 1612)
- John Hagthorpe, Divine Meditations, and Elegies
- Patrick Hannay, The Nightingale, Sheretine and Mariana. A Happy Husband. Eligies on the Death of Queene Anne. Songs and Sonnets. (A Happy Husband first published separately in 1619 with Richard Brathwait's Description of a Good Wife; Elegies on Queene Anne also published separately in 1619)

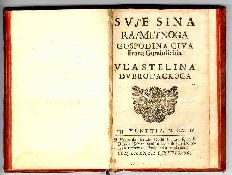
Title page of Ivan Gundulić's Tears of the Prodigal Son

- Abraham Holland, Naumachia; or, Holland's sea-fight
- Samuel Rowlands, Good News and Bad Newes
- John Taylor, A Memorial of all the English Monarchs
- George Wither:
  - Faire-Virtue, the Mistresse of Phil'arete
  - Juvenilia

=== Other ===
- Ivan Gundulić, Tears of the Prodigal Son (Suze sina razmetnoga), Croatian work published in Venice, Italy
- Theophile de Viau, Le Parnasse satyrique, a collection of licentious poems, published under his name, although many of the pieces were written by others; the publication led to de Viau's denunciation by the Jesuits in 1623 and a death sentence, later amended to exile within France; France
- John of the Cross (died 1591), Spiritual Canticle, Spanish mystical poem, largely written in 1577, first published, in French translation in Paris
- Pang Tat, called Neak Pang, The Poem of Angkor Wat (ល្បើកអង្គរវត្), Khmer epic inscribed in Cambodia
- Alessandro Tassoni, La secchia rapita ("The Rape of the Bucket"), a mock-heroic epic poem; Italy

== Births ==
Death years link to the corresponding "[year] in poetry" article:

- January 15 – Molière (died 1673), French playwright, poet and actor
- March 28 – Ermes di Colorêt (died 1692), Friulian courtier and poet
- Francesc Fontanella (died 1685), Catalan poet, dramatist and priest
- Luo Mu (died 1706), Chinese painter, poet and prose writer

== Deaths ==
Birth years link to the corresponding "[year] in poetry" article:

- June 4 – Péter Révay (born 1568), Hungarian poet, nobleman, Royal Crown Guard for the Holy Crown of Hungary, state official, soldier and historian
- August 21 – Juan de Tassis, 2nd Count of Villamediana (born 1582), Spanish
- November 4 – Francisco Rodrigues Lobo (born 1580), Portuguese poet and bucolic writer, drowned
- December 13 – Johannes Vodnianus Campanus (born 1572), Czech poet and playwright
- John Owen (born 1560), Welsh poet and epigrammatist writing in Latin
- Mathew Roydon (born 1580), English poet associated with the School of Night group of poets and writers

== See also ==
- Poetry
- 16th century in poetry
- 16th century in literature
