= 1562 in poetry =

Nationality words link to articles with information on the nation's poetry or literature (for instance, Irish or France).

== Events ==
- 18 January – First performance of Thomas Norton and Thomas Sackville's play Gorboduc before Queen Elizabeth I. It is the first known English tragedy and the first English-language play to employ blank verse.

== Works published ==
=== England ===
- Thomas Brice, Against Filthy Writing, and Such Like Delighting
- Arthur Brooke, translation, The Tragicall History of Romeus and Juliet, a narrative poem, translated from the French version by Pierre Boaistuau (Paris, 1559) of Matteo Bandello's story, "La sfortunata morte di dui infelicissimi manti", from Bandello's Novelle, 1554; Brooke's work is considered to be William Shakespeare's chief source for his play Romeo and Juliet (1597).
- Barnabe Googe, Eglogs, Epytaphes and Sonettes (sources disagree on the year of publication; another source asserts the book was published in 1563)
- John Heywood:
  - A Ballad Against Slander and Detraction
  - Woorkes, including the author's 600 previously published epigrams and his proverbs; the book proved popular, with new editions in 1566, 1576, 1587 and 1598.
- Thomas Phaer, The Nyne First Bookes of the Eneidos of Virgil, edited by W. Wightman (see also The Seven First Bookes 1558, The Whole Twelve Bookes 1573, The Thirteen Bookes 1584)

=== Other ===
- Francesco Berni Latin poems, Florence, Italy
- Maurice Scève, Microcosme, a long, cosmic, religious and scientific poem about the creation of man, his fate and his achievements; France
- Clément Marot and Theodore Beza, The Geneva Psalter, revised edition, with rhymed versions of all 150 Psalms for the first time; some earlier melodies were replaced; many of the lyrics were updated or replaced and all were written by Marot and De Bèze (see also, The Geneva Psalter 1539, 1542, 1543; an edition with changed melodies was published in 1551), Swiss, French-language work published in Geneva
- Torquato Tasso, Renaud, heroic poem, Italy

== Births ==
Death years link to the corresponding "[year] in poetry" article:

- January 13 – Mark Alexander Boyd (died 1601), Scottish poet and soldier of fortune
- January 15 (baptized) – Robert Tofte (died 1620), English translator and poet
- January 20 – Ottavio Rinuccini (died 1621), Italian poet, courtier and opera librettist
- August 26 (baptized) – Bartolomé Leonardo de Argensola (died 1631), Spanish poet, writer and historian; brother of poet Lupercio Leonardo de Argensola
- November 25 – Félix Lope de Vega (died 1635), Spanish poet and playwright
- Also:
  - Henry Constable (died 1613), English poet
  - Samuel Daniel (died 1619), English poet and historian
  - Alonso de Ledesma, born this year, according to many sources, or 1552, according to many others (died 1623), Spanish

== Deaths ==
Birth years link to the corresponding "[year] in poetry" article:

- Nicholas Grimald (born 1519), English poet and translator
- Georg Wickram (born 1505), German poet and novelist

== See also ==
- Poetry
- 16th century in poetry
- 16th century in literature
- Dutch Renaissance and Golden Age literature
- Elizabethan literature
- French Renaissance literature
- Renaissance literature
- Spanish Renaissance literature
