= 1575 in poetry =

This article covers 1575 in poetry. Nationality words link to articles with information on the nation's poetry or literature (for instance, Irish or French).

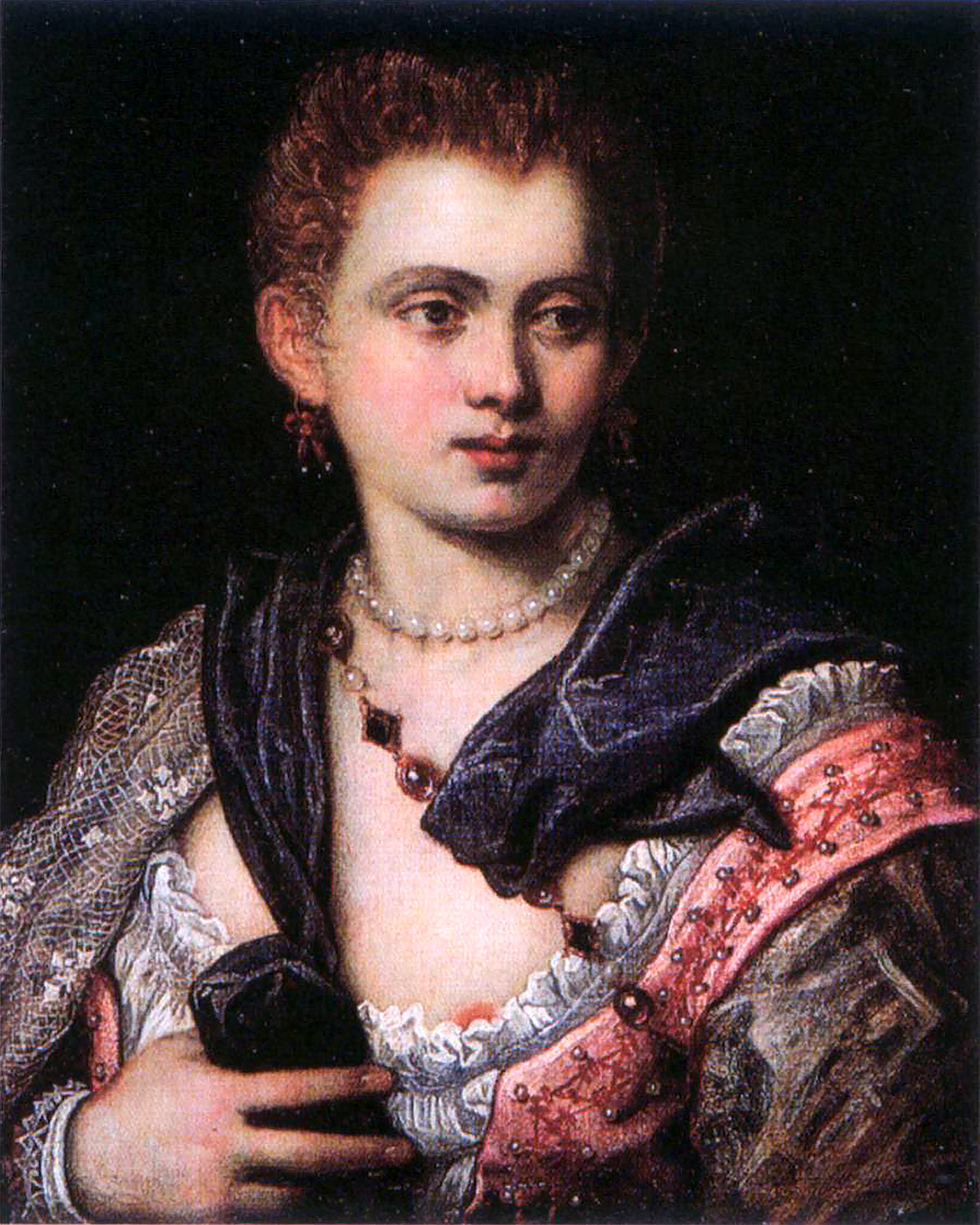
Venetian poet and courtesan Veronica Franco painted in the style of Tintoretto, c.1575

== Works published ==
=== Great Britain ===
- Nicholas Breton, A Small Handful of Fragrant Flowers
- Thomas Churchyard, The Firste Parte of Churchyardes Chippes, some prose but mostly poetry; in part, it recounts how Queen Elizabeth was received by the city of Bristow
- George Gascoigne, The Posies of George Gascoigne Esquire, the second, very expanded edition of A Hundreth Sundrie Flowres 1573; includes "The Fruits of Warre" (the author's longest poem}) and "Certayne Notes of Instruction Concerning the Making of Verse or Ryme in English" (see also The Whole Woorkes 1587)
- John Rolland, The Court of Venus

== Other ==
- Philippe Desportes, an edition of his works; France
- Veronica Franco, Terze rime; Italian

== Births ==
Death years link to the corresponding "[year] in poetry" article:

- August 14 – Robert Hayman (died 1629) poet, colonist and Proprietary Governor of Bristol's Hope colony in Newfoundland; his book, ''Qvodlibets ("What you will"), published in 1628, is the first book of English poetry written in what would become Canada.
- Also:
  - Edmund Bolton (died c. 1633), English historian and poet, born this year by his own account
  - Cyril Tourneur (died 1626), English playwright and poet
  - Sir William Vaughan, "Orpheus junior" (died 1641), Welsh writer, poet and colonial investor
  - Henry Willobie (died 1596), English
- Approximate date:
  - Walter Quin (died 1640), Irish-born English court poet and author writing in English, Latin, French and Italian

== Deaths ==
- April 10 (buried) – Anna Bijns (born 1493), Dutch
- August 14 – Diego Hurtado de Mendoza (born 1503), Spanish
- Also:
  - Giovanni Battista Pigna (born 1530), Italian, Latin-language poet
  - Adam Reusner (approximate date; born sometime from 1471 to 1496), German
  - William Stevenson (born 1530), English poet, author and clergyman; presumed playwright

== See also ==
- Poetry
- 16th century in poetry
- 16th century in literature
- Dutch Renaissance and Golden Age literature
- Elizabethan literature
- French Renaissance literature
- Renaissance literature
- Spanish Renaissance literature
