= Richard Brathwait =

English poet

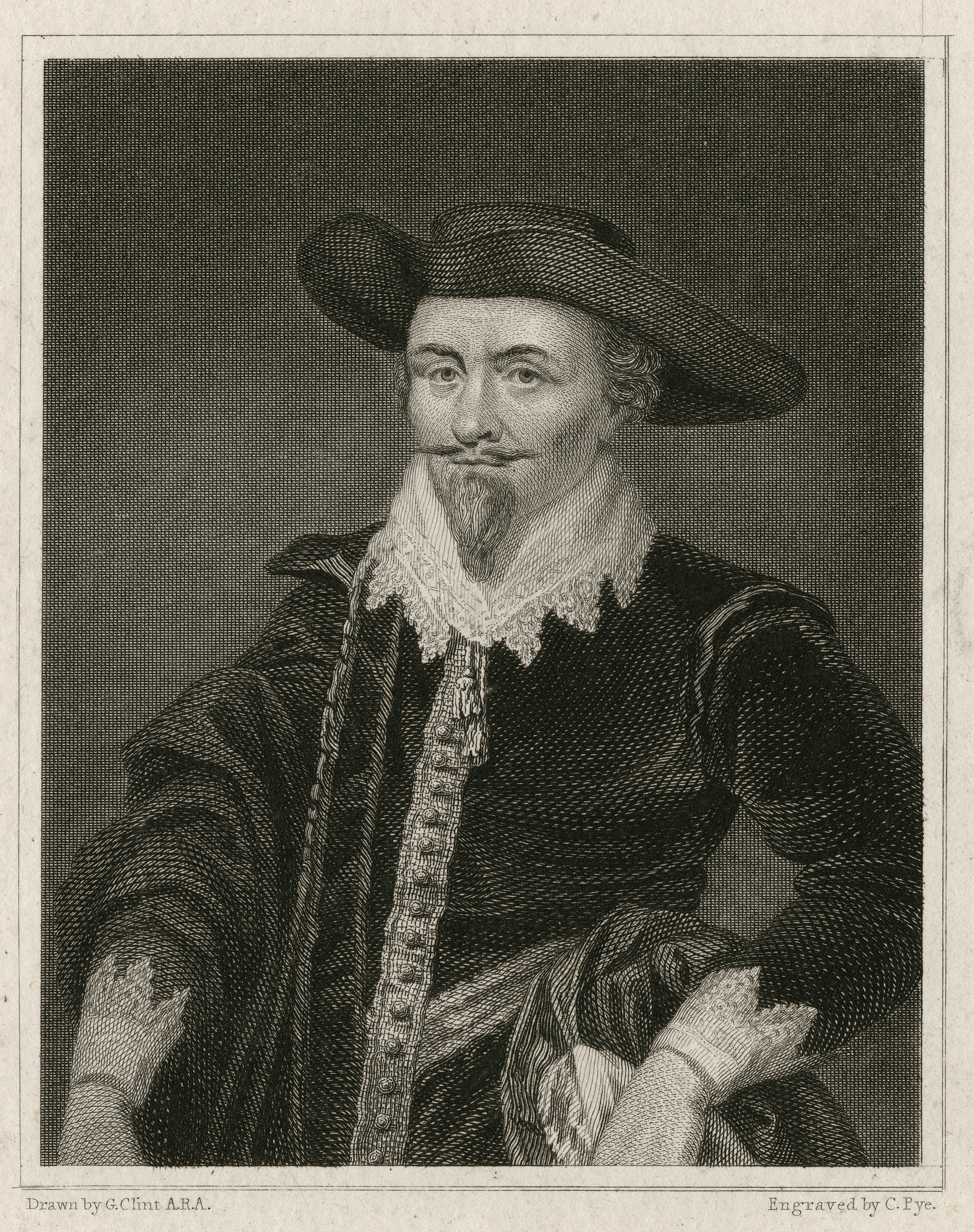
- Born: 1588 near Kendal, Cumberland
- Died: 1673 (aged 84–85); Catterick, Richmondshire
- Occupation: Poet
- Notable work: Drunken Barnaby's Four Journeys

Richard Brathwait (or Brathwaite, Braithwaite) (1588 – 4 May 1673) was an English poet.

== Life ==
Brathwait was born at Burnishead, near Kendal. He entered Oriel College, Oxford in 1604, and remained there for some years, pursuing the study of poetry and Roman history. He moved to Cambridge to study law at the university and afterwards to London to the Inns of Court. His father, Thomas, died in 1610, and Brathwait went down to live on the estate he inherited. He was married at Hurworth in County Durham, 4 May 1617, to Frances, daughter of James Lawson, of Nesham Abbey.

In 1633 his wife died, and in 1639 he married again. His only son by this second marriage, Sir Strafford Brathwait, was killed at sea. Brathwait is believed to have served with the Royalist army in the Civil War.

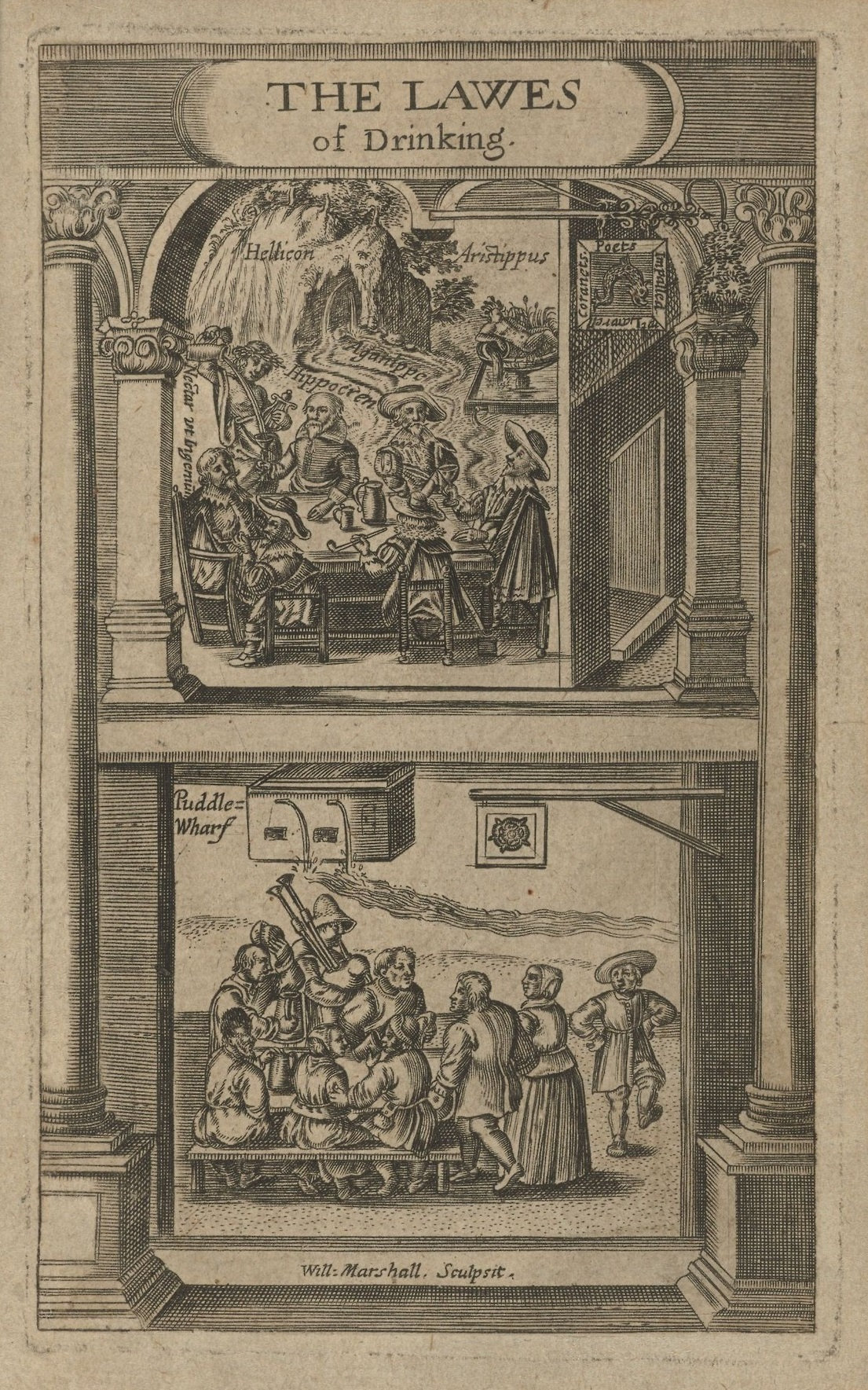
Frontispiece to A Solemne Joviall Disputation, 1617

He was the author of many works of very unequal merit, of which the best known is Barnabæ Itinerarium, Mirtili & Faustuli Nominibus Insignitum (c. 1636) which was translated into English as Barnabees Journall; under the Names of Mirtilus & Faustulus Shadowed (1638) and later called Drunken Barnaby's Four Journeys, which records his pilgrimages through England in rhymed Latin (said by Robert Southey to be the best of modern times), and doggerel English verse. The English Gentleman (1631) and English Gentlewoman are in a much more decorous strain. Other works are The Golden Fleece (1611) (poems), The Poet's Willow, A Strappado for the Devil (a satire), and Art Asleepe, Husband?

His 1613 book The Yong Mans Gleanings contains the first known use of the word "computer"; he used the word to refer to an "arithmetician".

An extract from both Drunken Barnaby and his “epitaph to Frances, (his wife)” appears in The Bishoprick Garland by Sir Cuthbert Sharp.

== Works ==
A list of works by Braitwait follows:

- Barnabæ Itinerarium, Mirtili & Faustuli Nominibus Insignitum (c. 1636); translated into English as Barnabees Journall; under the Names of Mirtilus & Faustulus Shadowed (1638)
- A Spiritual Spicerie: Containing Sundrie Sweet Tractates of Devotion and Piety (1638) – contains mostly works translated from other authors
