= 1636 in poetry =

This article covers 1636 in poetry Nationality words link to articles with information on the nation's poetry or literature (for instance, Irish or France).

== Works published ==
- Richard Brathwaite, The Fatall Nuptiall; or, Mournefull Marriage, anonymously published
- John Saltmarsh, Poemata sacra
- Wye Saltonstall, Ovids Heroicall Epistles, translated from the Latin of Ovid's Epistolae heriodum
- Longinus, On the Sublime, an edition (not in English) by Gerard Langbaine at Oxford; a widely known edition; Ancient Greek criticism; twice reprinted before 1551 (see John Hall's translation, the first into English, 1652; and Nicolas Boileau-Despréaux's influential translation into French in 1674)

== Births ==
Death years link to the corresponding "[year] in poetry" article:

- January 1 – Jacques Cassagne (died 1679), French clergyman, poet and moralist
- April 7 – Gregório de Matos, (died 1696), Brazilian Baroque poet
- November 1 – Nicolas Boileau-Despréaux (died 1711), French poet and critic
- Also:
  - Jean de Montigny (died 1671), French poet and philosopher
  - Thomas Traherne, born this year or in 1637 (died 1674), English poet and religious writer

== Deaths ==
Birth years link to the corresponding "[year] in poetry" article:

- January 19 – Daniel Schwenter (born 1585), German Orientalist, mathematician, inventor, poet and librarian
- August 25 – Bhai Gurdas (born 1551), Punjabi Sikh scholar, poet and scribe of the Adi Granth

== See also ==
- Poetry
- 17th century in poetry
- 17th century in literature
