= 1568 in poetry =

Nationality words link to articles with information on the nation's poetry or literature (for instance, Irish or France).

== Events ==
- Simwnt Fychan appointed "pencerdd", or senior bard, by Elizabeth I of England
- Siôn Phylip ordained as a master poet at the second Eisteddfod in Caerwys

== Works published ==
=== England ===
- Thomas Drant, Epigrams and Sentences Spirituall in Vers, translated from St. Gregory Nazianzus
- Thomas Howell (poet), The Arbor of Amitie
- John Skelton, Pithy Pleasaunt and Profitable Workes of Maister Skelton, edited by J. Stow; published posthumously (died 1529) by Thomas Marshe
- George Turberville, A Plaine Path to Perfect Vertue, translation of Dominic Mancini's De quatour virtutibus

=== Other ===
- François d'Amboise, Élégie sur le trépas d'Anne de Montmorency, France
- Petar Hektorović, Ribanje i ribarsko prigovaranje ("Fishing and Fishermen's Talk"), three-part pastoral and philosophic narrative poem written in Croatian and published in Venice

== Births ==
Death years link to the corresponding "[year] in poetry" article:

- February 2 – Peter Révay (died 1622), Hungarian poet, nobleman, Royal Crown Guard for the Holy Crown of Hungary, state official, soldier and historian
- March 30 – Henry Wotton (died 1639), English diplomat, author and poet
- September 3 – Adriano Banchieri (died 1634), Italian composer, music theorist, organist and poet
- September 5 – Tommaso Campanella (died 1639), philosopher and poet
- Also:
  - Yuan Hongdao (died 1610), Chinese poet of the Ming Dynasty and one of the Three Yuan Brothers
  - Gervase Markham, birth year uncertain (died 1637), English poet and writer

== Deaths ==
Birth years link to the corresponding "[year] in poetry" article:

- September 14 – Jan van Casembroot (born 1525), South Holland noble and poet
- December 23 – Roger Ascham (born c. 1515), English scholar, didactic writer and poet; died from a chill contracted when staying up all night to finish a New Year's Day poem for Queen Elizabeth I, whom he had tutored
- Abderrahman El Majdoub (born unknown), Berber Moroccan poet
- Antoine Héroet (born unknown), French philosopher, theologian, astrologer and poet
- Luigi Tansillo (born 1510), Italian poet of Petrarchan sonnets and Marinist style

== See also ==
- Poetry
- 16th century in poetry
- 16th century in literature
- Dutch Renaissance and Golden Age literature
- Elizabethan literature
- French Renaissance literature
- Renaissance literature
- Spanish Renaissance literature
