= 1639 in poetry =

The year 1639 was marked, in poetry, by the following events. Nationality words link to articles with information on the nation's poetry or literature (for instance, Irish or France).

== Works published ==
- Robert Davenport, A Crowne for a Conquerour; and Too Late to Call Backe Yesterday
- Henry Glapthorne, Poems

== Births ==
Death years link to the corresponding "[year] in poetry" article:

- March 5 (bapt.) – Charles Sedley (died 1701), English wit, dramatist, poet and statesman
- Guillaume Amfrye de Chaulieu (died 1720), French poet and wit

== Deaths ==
Birth years link to the corresponding "[year] in poetry" article:

- May 21 – Tommaso Campanella (born 1568), Italian philosopher and poet
- August 20 – Martin Opitz (born 1597), German
- October – Elizabeth Cary, Viscountess Falkland (born 1585), English poet, translator and dramatist
- December – Sir Henry Wotton (born 1568), English diplomat, author and poet
- Possible date – John Ford (born 1586), English playwright and poet

== See also ==
- Poetry
- 17th century in poetry
- 17th century in literature
