= 1643 in poetry =

This article covers 1643 in poetry. Nationality words link to articles with information on the nation's poetry or literature (for instance, Irish or France).

== Works published ==
- George Wither, Campo-Musae

== Births ==
Death years link to the corresponding "[year] in poetry" article:

- Francisco Antonio de Fuentes y Guzmán (died 1700), Guatemalan historian and poet
- Fran Krsto Frankopan (died 1671), Croatian poet and politician
- Joseph de Jouvancy (died 1719), French poet, pedagogue, philologist, and historian
- François-Joseph de Beaupoil de Sainte-Aulaire (died 1742), French poet and army officer

== Deaths ==
Birth years link to the corresponding "[year] in poetry" article:

- November 29 – William Cartwright (born 1611), English dramatist, poet and churchman
- Banarasidas (born 1586), businessman and poet in Mughal India
- Christoph Demantius (born 1567), German composer, music theorist, writer and poet
- Henry Glapthorne (born 1610), English poet and playwright
- Sir Sidney Godolphin (born 1610), English
- Cheng Jiasui (born 1565), Chinese landscape painter and poet
- Pedro de Oña (born 1570), first known Chilean poet
- Henry Peacham the Younger (born 1578), English poet and writer
- Sir Thomas Salusbury, 2nd Baronet (born 1612), Welsh politician and poet
- Aurelian Townshend (born 1583), English poet and playwright

== See also ==
- Poetry
- 17th century in poetry
- 17th century in literature
- Cavalier poets in England, who supported the monarch against the puritans in the English Civil War
