= 1632 in poetry =

Nationality words link to articles with information on the nation's poetry or literature (for instance, Irish or France).

== Works published ==
- Arthur Johnston, Epigrammata, Scottish poet writing in Latin
- John Lyly, Alexander and Campaspe
- John Milton, "An Epitaph on the Admirable Dramaticke Poet, W. Shakespeare", printed anonymously in the Second Folio of William Shakespeare's plays
- Johannes Narssius, Gustavidos sive de bello Sueco-austriaco libri tres
- Francis Quarles, Divine Fancies: Digested into epigrammes, meditations and observations

== Births ==
Death years link to the corresponding "[year] in poetry" article:

- January 1 – Katherine Philips, née Fowler (died 1664), London-born Anglo-Welsh poet
- August 13 – François-Séraphin Régnier-Desmarais (died 1713), French ecclesiastic, grammarian, diplomat and poet in French, Spanish and Latin
- Étienne Pavillon (died 1705), French lawyer and poet
- Rahman Baba (died 1706), Indian Pashto poet
- Wang Wu (died 1690), Chinese painter and poet
- Wu Li (died 1718), Chinese landscape painter and poet

== Deaths ==
Birth years link to the corresponding "[year] in poetry" article:

- February 23 – Giambattista Basile (born c. 1570), Italian poet, courtier and collector of fairy tales
- February/March – John Weever (born 1576), English poet and antiquary
- July 29 – Samuel Ampzing (born 1590), Dutch clergyman and poet
- August 25 – Thomas Dekker (born 1572), English playwright, writer, pamphleteer and poet
- Ye Wanwan, died this year, according to one source, or in 1633, according to another (born 1610), Chinese poet and daughter of poet Shen Yixiu; also sister of women poets Ye Xiaowan and Ye Xiaoluan
- Last known reference – Henry Reynolds (born 1564), English poet, schoolmaster and literary critic
- Possible date – John Webster (born c. 1580), English Jacobean dramatist and poet

== See also ==
- Poetry
- 17th century in poetry
- 17th century in literature
