= 1631 in poetry =

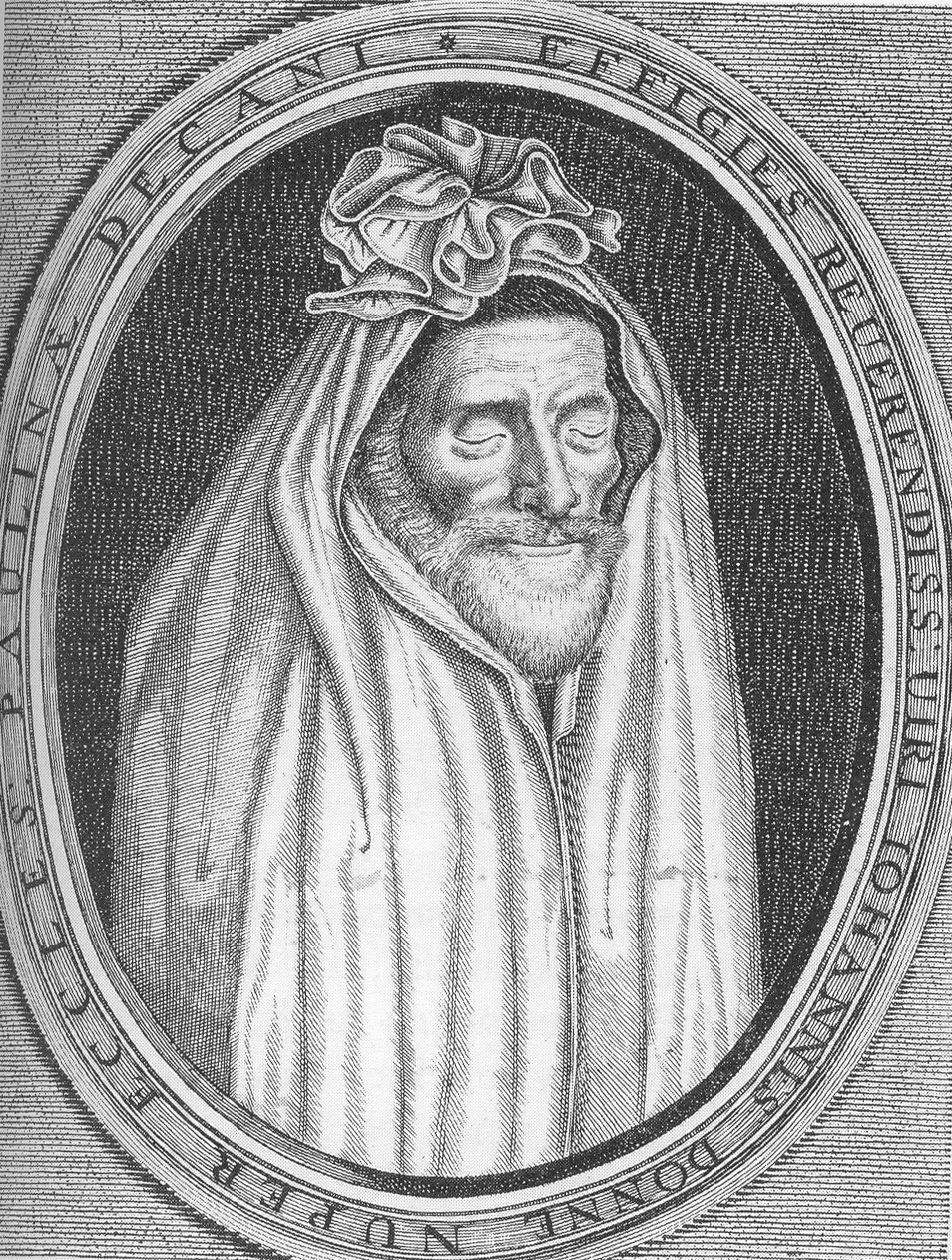
A few months before his death, John Donne commissioned this portrait of himself as he expected to appear when he rose from the grave at the Apocalypse. He hung the portrait on his wall as a reminder of the transience of life. The next year, a memorial statue of Donne was erected at St. Paul's Cathedral, with the statue carved from this image.

Nationality words link to articles with information on the nation's poetry or literature (for instance, Irish or France).

== Works ==
=== France ===
- Georges de Scudéry Œuvres poétiques ("Poetic Works"),
- Jean-Louis Guez de Balzac:
  - Aristippe ou De la cour
  - Le Prince, eulogy on King Louis XIII

=== Great Britain ===
- Charles Aleyn, The Battailes of Crescey, and Poctiers
- Richard Braithwait:
  - The English Gentleman
  - The English Gentlewoman
- William L'Isle, The Faire Aethiopian, published anonymously; verse translation of Heliodorus, Aethiopica)
- David Lloyd, The Legend of Captain Jones, Part 1; published anonymously; attributed to Lloyd or, sometimes, to Martin Lluelyn (Part 2 in 1648)

=== Other ===
- Francisco de Quevedo, La aguja de navegar cultos con la receta para hacer Soledades en un día, satire attacking poets who use gongorino or culterano language, Spain, criticism

== Births ==
Death years link to the corresponding "[year] in poetry" article:

- January 1 – Katharine Philips (died 1664), Welsh
- August 19 (Old style: August 9) – John Dryden (died 1700) influential English poet, literary critic, translator and playwright, who dominated the literary life of Restoration England to such a point that the period came to be known in literary circles as the Age of Dryden.
- October 18 – Michael Wigglesworth (died 1705), English Puritan minister and doctor, colonist in America called "the most popular of early New England poets"
- date not known – John Phillips (died 1706), poet and satirist, brother of Edward Phillips and nephew of John Milton

== Deaths ==
Birth years link to the corresponding "[year] in poetry" article:

- February 4 – Bartolomé Leonardo de Argensola (born 1562), Spanish poet, writer and chronicler; brother of poet Lupercio Leonardo de Argensola
- February 7 – Gabriel Harvey (born c.1545), English poet and author
- March 31 – John Donne (born 1572), English poet, preacher
- December 23 – Michael Drayton (born 1563), English

== See also ==
- Poetry
- 16th century in poetry
- 16th century in literature
