= 1710 in poetry =

List of years in poetry	(table)
- … 1700; 1701; 1702; 1703; 1704; 1705; 1706; 1707; 1708; 1709; 1710; 1711; 1712; 1713; 1714; 1715; 1716; 1717; 1718; 1719; 1720 …
- In literature 1707 1708 1709 1710 1711 1712 1713
- Art; Archaeology; Architecture; Literature; Music; Philosophy; Science; +...

Nationality words link to articles with information on the nation's poetry or literature (for instance, Irish or France).

== Events ==
- February – A year after the death of poet John Philips, Edmund Smith prints a "Poem to the Memory of Mr John Philips". Other memorials to the poet this year include "A Poem to the Memory of the Incomparable Mr Philips" by Leonard Welsted, and a monument in his memory is erected by Lord Harcourt in Westminster Abbey, between those to Chaucer and Drayton, with the motto "Honos erit huic quoque pomo" from the title page of Philips' work Cyder.
- October – The Medley, a literary periodical, first issued; founded by Arthur Maynwaring, contributors included Richard Steele, John Oldmixon; weekly to August, 1711
- November – The Examiner, a literary periodical, first issued, founded by Henry St. John, Francis Atterbury, Matthew Prior and John Freind; initially edited by William King, also edited by Jonathan Swift, who was also a major contributor; weekly to June 1711

== Works published ==
- William Congreve, The Works of Mr. William Congreve, in three volumes
- George Farquhar, Barcellona: a poem; or, the Spanish expedition under the command of Charles Earl of Peterborough, epic
- Ambrose Philips, Pastorals
- John Wilmot, Earl of Rochester, Poems on Several Occasions: with Valentinian; a Tragedy. To which is added, Advice to a Painter. Written by the Right Honourable John, late Earl of Rochester, London: Printed by H. Hills & sold by the booksellers of London & Westminster, posthumous

== Births ==
Death years link to the corresponding "[year] in poetry" article:

- 6 February – Paul Whitehead (died 1774), English satiric poet
- 22 May – James Hammond (died 1742), English poet and politician
- 27 November – Robert Lowth (died 1787), English Bishop of the Church of England, poet, professor of poetry at the University of Oxford and grammarian, author of one of the most influential textbooks on English grammar
- Also:
  - Angom Gopi (died 1780), Meitei language poet, writer and translator
  - George Alexander Stevens (died 1780), English playwright and poet

== Deaths ==
Birth years link to the corresponding "[year] in poetry" article:

- 1 November – Michael Kongehl (born 1646), German baroque poet
- 15 December (bur.) – Lady Mary Chudleigh (born 1656), English poet and essayist

== See also ==
- Poetry
- List of years in poetry
- List of years in literature
- 18th century in poetry
- 18th century in literature
- Augustan poetry
