= 1734 British general election =

← 1727	22 April – 6 June 1734	1741 →

All 558 seats in the House of Commons 280 seats needed for a majority
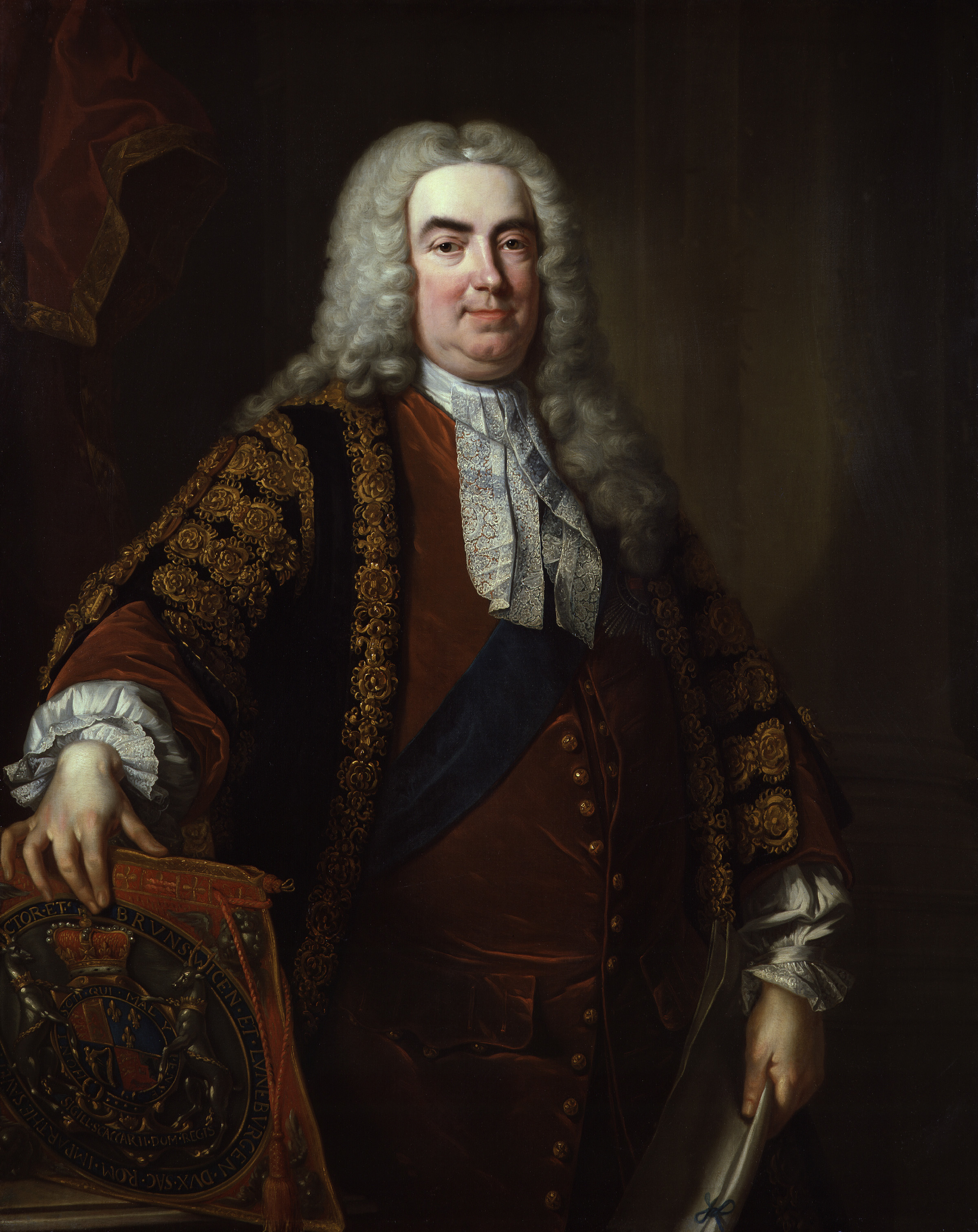

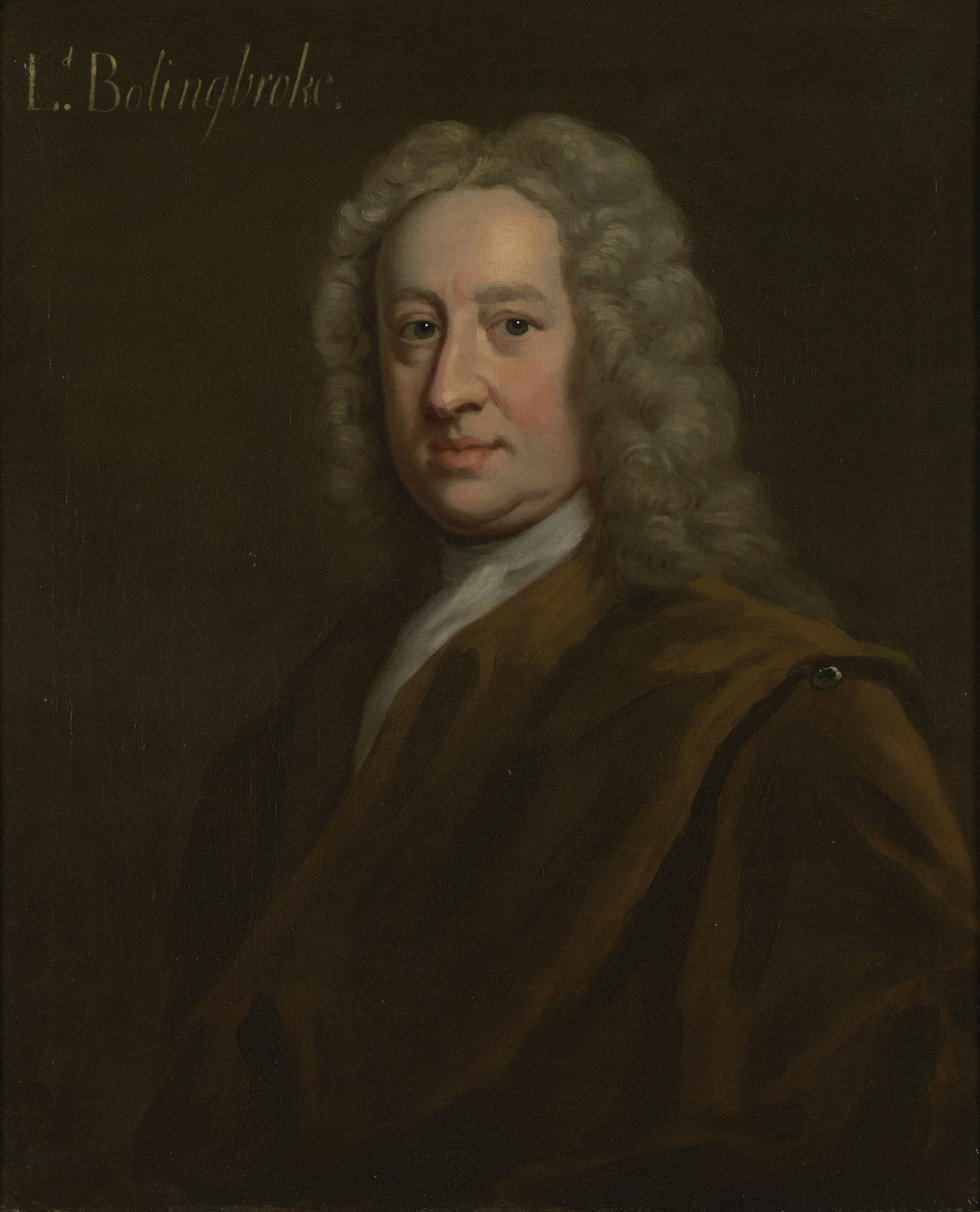

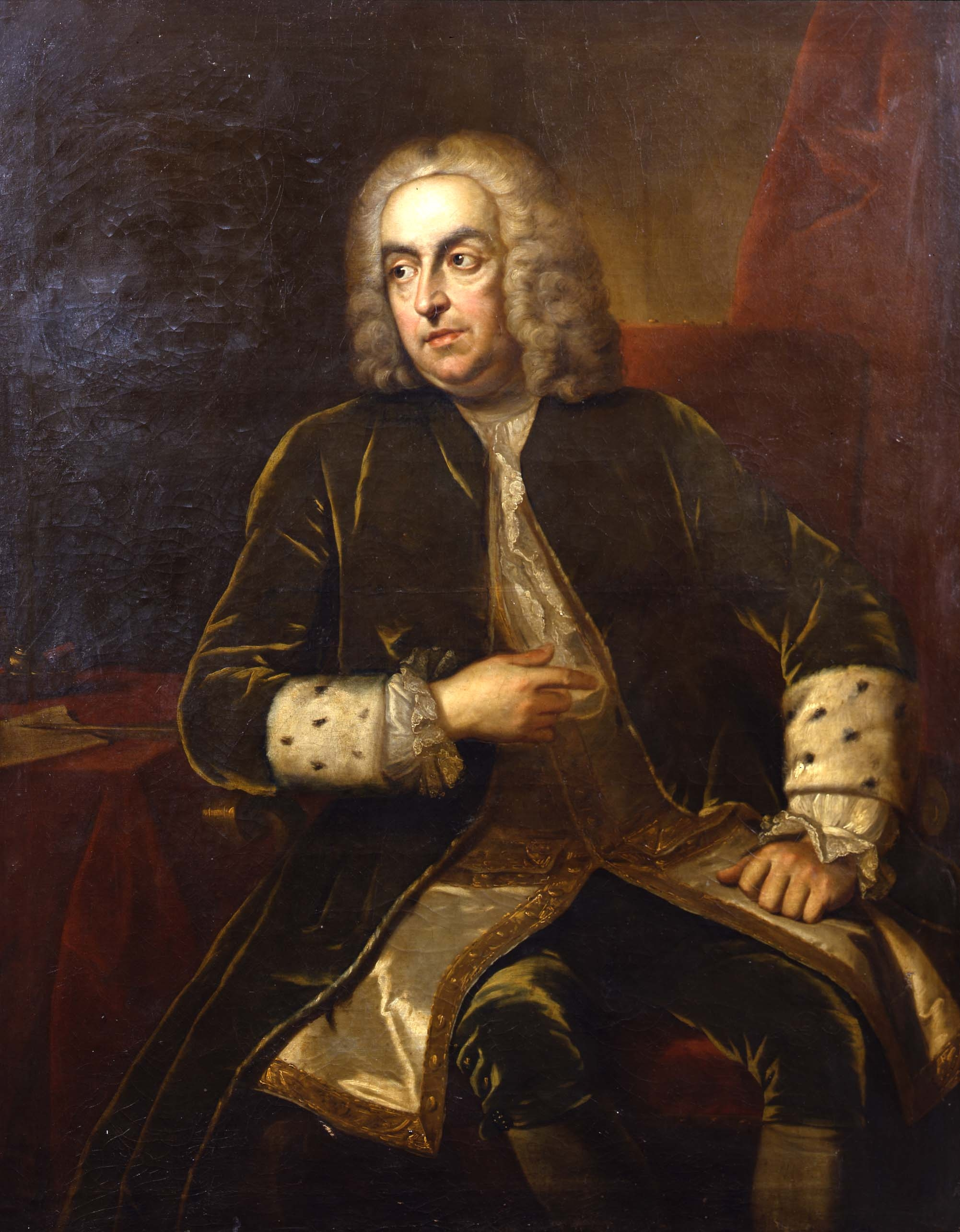
	First party	Second party	Third party
Leader	Sir Robert Walpole	Viscount Bolingbroke	William Pulteney
Party	Whig	Tory	Opposition / Patriot Whigs
Leader's seat	King's Lynn	House of Lords	Middlesex
Seats won	330	145	83
Seat change	▼85	▲17	▲68
- Composition of the House of Commons after the election
Prime Minister before election
Sir Robert Walpole
Whig
Prime Minister after election
Sir Robert Walpole
Whig

The 1734 British general election returned members to serve in the House of Commons of the 8th Parliament of Great Britain to be summoned, after the merger of the Parliament of England and the Parliament of Scotland in 1707. Robert Walpole's increasingly unpopular Whig government lost ground to the Tories and the opposition Whigs, but still had a secure majority in the House of Commons. The Patriot Whigs under William Pulteney were joined in opposition by a group of Whig members led by Lord Cobham. They were known as the Cobhamites, or 'Cobham's Cubs'.

== Summary of the constituencies ==
See 1796 British general election for details. The constituencies used were the same throughout the existence of the Parliament of Great Britain.

== Dates of election ==
The general election was held between 22 April 1734 and 6 June 1734.

At this period elections did not take place at the same time in every constituency. The returning officer in each county or parliamentary borough fixed the precise date (see hustings for details of the conduct of the elections).

== Results ==

=== Seats summary ===
Parliamentary seats
Whig	59.1%
Tory	25.9%
Patriot	14.8%

== See also ==
- List of parliaments of Great Britain
- List of MPs elected in the 1734 British general election
