= 1675 in poetry =

Nationality words link to articles with information on the nation's poetry or literature (for instance, Irish or France).

== Events ==
- Guru Gobind Singh becomes guru at the age of nine years

== Works published ==
=== English ===
- Charles Cotton:
  - Burlesque upon Burlesque; or, The Scoffer Scoft, published anonymously
  - The Scoffer Scoft, the second part of the above Burlesque [...]
- Thomas Hobbes, translator, The Odyssey of Homer (the author's translation of the Iliad was published in 1676)
- Richard Leigh, Poems, upon Several Occasions, and, to Several Persons
- Edward Phillips, editorTheatrum Poetarum; or, A Compleat Collection of the Poets of all Ages

=== Other ===
- René Le Bossu, Traité du Poeme Epique, a systematic description of epic poetry, based on Aristotle; the book was very favorably received; criticism, France

== Births ==
Death years link to the corresponding "[year] in poetry" article:

- February – Ignjat Đurđević (died 1737), Croatian poet and translator
- February 26 (bapt.) – Abel Evans (died 1737), English clergyman, academic and poet
- August 31 – Elizabeth Thomas (died 1731), English poet
- September 2 – William Somervile (died 1742), English poet
- October 17 (bapt.) – Samuel Cobb (died 1716), English poet
- Also:
  - Cille Gad (died 1711), Norwegian female poet and academic
  - Jamie Macpherson (died 1700), Scottish outlaw, famed for his lament
  - Vakhtang VI (died 1737), Kartli statesman, legislator, scholar, critic, translator and poet

== Deaths ==
Birth years link to the corresponding "[year] in poetry" article:

- April 24 – Pierre Perrin (born 1620), French poet and libretto composer
- September 12 – Girolamo Graziani (born 1604), Italian poet
- November 14 – Johannes Khuen (born 1606), Bavarian German priest, poet and composer
- Also – Emanuele Tesauro (born 1592), Italian rhetorician, dramatist, Marinist poet and historian
- Approximate date – William Mercer (born 1605), Scottish poet and army officer

== See also ==
- Poetry
- 17th century in poetry
- 17th century in literature
- Restoration literature
