= 1780 in poetry =

This article covers 1780 in poetry. Nationality words link to articles with information on the nation's poetry or literature (for instance, Irish or France).

== Works published ==
=== United Kingdom ===
- Hannah Cowley, The Maid of Aragon, Part 1 (complete work first published in The Works of mrs Cowley 1813)
- George Crabbe, The Candidate, published anonymously in July
- Herbert Croft, The Abbey of Kilkhampton; or, Monumental Records for the Year 1980, published anonymously; satirical epitaphs on contemporary public figures
- Susannah Harrison, Songs in the Night, "By a Young Woman Under Deep Afflictions", the book went into 15 editions by 1823
- William Hayley, An Essay on History
- Anna Seward, Elegy on Captain Cook, on James Cook, who died February 13, 1779, in Hawaii

=== United States ===
- John Andre, "Cow-Chace, in Three Cantos, Published on Occasion of the Rebel General Wayne's Attack of the Refugees Block-House on Hudson's river, on Friday the 21st of July, 1780
- Joel Barlow, An Elegy on the Late Honorahble Titus Hosmer
- Samuel Dexter, The Progress of Science
- Timothy Dwight IV, attributed, America: or, A Poem on the Settlement of the British Colonies
- Jonathan Odell, attributed, "The American Times"

=== Other ===
- Christoph Martin Wieland, Oberon, Germany

== Births ==
Death years link to the corresponding "[year] in poetry" article:

- March 29 – Walter Watson (died 1854), Scottish poet and weaver
- April 29 – Charles Nodier (died 1844), French philologist, novelist, poet and librarian
- August 17 – George Croly (died 1860), Irish poet, novelist, historian and clergyman
- September 11 (bapt.) – John Marriott (died 1825), English clergyman and poet
- Paul Moon James (died 1854), English Quaker banker and poet
- Jahonotin Uvaysiy (died 1845), Uzbek Sufi poet

== Deaths ==
Birth years link to the corresponding "[year] in poetry" article:

- February 18 – Kristijonas Donelaitis (born 1714), Lithuanian poet
- September 6 – George Alexander Stevens (born 1710), English performer, playwright, poet and songwriter
- October 3 – Cynthia Lenige (born 1755), Frisian Dutch poet
- Angom Gopi (born 1710), Indian, Meitei language poet, writer and translator
- Joseph Green (born 1706), Colonial American poet, satirist and clergyman
- Antonina Niemiryczowa (born 1702), Polish poet

== See also ==
- List of years in poetry
- List of years in literature
- 18th century in poetry
- 18th century in literature
- French literature of the 18th century
- Sturm und Drang (the conventional translation is "Storm and Stress"; a more literal translation, however, might be "storm and urge", "storm and longing", "storm and drive" or "storm and impulse"), a movement in German literature (including poetry) and music from the late 1760s through the early 1780s
- List of years in poetry
- Poetry
