= 1737 in poetry =

Nationality words link to articles with information on the nation's poetry or literature (for instance, Irish or France).

== Events ==
- March 2 – Samuel Johnson and his former pupil David Garrick leave Lichfield to seek their fortunes in London.
- English poet Richard Jago becomes curate of Snitterfield.

== Works published ==
=== United Kingdom ===
- Henry Carey, The Musical Century, in One Hundred English Ballads, with Carey's musical settings
- Stephen Duck, The Vision, on the November 20 death of Queen Caroline
- Richard Glover, Leonidas, in nine books (expanded to 12 in 1770)
- Matthew Green, The Spleen, has been called his chief poem; with a preface by his friend Richard Glover (see also, "Deaths" below)
- Alexander Pope:
  - Horace His Ode to Venus
  - The Second Epistle of the Second Book of Horace, Imitated
  - Letters of Mr. Alexander Pope, and Several of his Friends, the first authorized edition (see Letters of Mr Pope and Mr Pope's Literary Correspondence, both 1735)
  - The First Epistle of the Second Book of Horace, Imitated
  - The Works of Alexander Pope, Volumes 5 and 6, letters (see also Works 1717, 1735, 1736
- Allan Ramsay, co-author and editor, The Tea-Table Miscellany, a collection of Scots songs, in Scots and English, composed or amended by Ramsay and his friends, the last of four volumes, with the first volume published in 1724
- William Shenstone, Poems Upon Various Occasions, published anonymously; includes the earliest version of "The School-mistress", with 12 stanzas (expanded version in 28 stanzas published separately in 1742, the final version in 35 stanzas published in Volume 1 of Dodsley's Collection of Poems 1748)
- Jonathan Swift, Poems on Several Occasions
- John Wesley and Charles Wesley, A Collection of Psalms and Hymns

=== Other ===
- Ignacio de Luzán, Poética, work of criticism that gives classic rules in Spanish literary composition
- Prince Thammathibet, The Legend of Phra Malai (พระมาลัยคำหลวง, Phra Malai), Thai

== Births ==
Death years link to the corresponding "[year] in poetry" article:

- January 3 – Heinrich Wilhelm von Gerstenberg (died 1823), German poet and critic
- February 3 – Elizabeth Graeme Fergusson (died 1801), Colonial American poet and sponsor of literary salons
- May 18 – Gottlob Burmann (died 1805), German poet and lipogrammatist
- Joseph Mather (died 1804), English file cutter and songwriter

== Deaths ==
Birth years link to the corresponding "[year] in poetry" article:

- January 21 – Ignjat Đurđević (born 1675), Croatian poet and translator
- February 20 – Elizabeth Rowe, née Singer (born 1674) English novelist, playwright and poet (apoplexy)
- March 26 – Vakhtang VI (born 1675), Kartli statesman, legislator, scholar, critic, translator and poet
- October 18 – Abel Evans (born 1679), English clergyman, academic and poet
- Matthew Green (born 1696); English poet (see Works above)

== See also ==
- Poetry
- List of years in poetry
- List of years in literature
- 18th century in poetry
- 18th century in literature
- Augustan poetry
- Scriblerus Club

== Notes ==
- "A Timeline of English Poetry" Web page of the Representative Poetry Online Web site, University of Toronto
