= 1724 in poetry =

This article covers 1724 in poetry. Nationality words link to articles with information on the nation's poetry or literature (for instance, Irish or France).

== Works published ==
- Matthew Concanen, editor, Miscellaneous Poems, Original and Translated
- Eliza Haywood, Poems on Several Occasions, published anonymously, issued in Volume 4 of a set of Works, likely published together
- Lady Mary Wortley Montagu, "Epistle from Mrs. Yonge to her Husband"
- Allan Ramsay
  - Editor, The Ever Green: Being a collection of Scots poems, in two volumes, the only two of the planned four volumes to be published; Scotland
  - Health
  - Co-author and editor, The Tea-Table Miscellany, a collection of Scots songs, in Scots and English, composed or amended by Ramsay and his friends, the first of four volumes, with the last volume published in 1737
- Elizabeth Tollet, Poems on Several Occasions, published anonymously
- William Warburton, Miscellaneous Translations, in Prose and Verse
- Leonard Welsted, Epistles, Odes &c., Written on Several Subjects

== Births ==
Death years link to the corresponding "[year] in poetry" article:

- January 12 – Frances Brooke, née Moore (died 1789), English novelist, poet, essayist, playwright and translator
- February 12 – William Mason (died 1797), English poet, editor and gardener
- February 25 – Karl Wilhelm Ramler (died 1798), German poet
- March 20 – Duncan Ban MacIntyre (died 1812), Scottish Gaelic poet
- May 18 – Magtymguly Pyragy (died c. 1807), Turkmen spiritual leader and poet
- July 2 – Friedrich Gottlieb Klopstock (died 1803), German poet
- August 28 – Diamante Medaglia Faini (died 1770), Italian poet
- August 30 – Agatha Lovisa de la Myle (died 1787), Baltic-German and Latvian poet
- October 31 – Christopher Anstey (died 1805), English writer and poet
- Friedrich Carl Casimir von Creuz (died 1770), German
- Frances Greville (died 1789), Irish poet
- Henriette Louise von Hayn (died 1782), German
- Johann Franz von Palthen (died 1804), German

== Deaths ==
Birth years link to the corresponding "[year] in poetry" article:

- February 7 – Hanabusa Itchō (born 1652), Japanese painter, calligrapher and haiku poet
- February 12 – Elkanah Settle (born 1648), English poet and playwright
- August 15 – Manko 万乎| (birth year unknown), Japanese middle Edo period poet and wealthy merchant; apprentice of Matsuo Bashō; has poems in Sarumino, Sumidawara and Zoku-sarumino

== See also ==
- Poetry
- List of years in poetry
- List of years in literature
- 18th century in poetry
- 18th century in literature
- Augustan poetry
- Scriblerus Club

== Notes ==
- "A Timeline of English Poetry" Web page of the Representative Poetry Online Web site, University of Toronto
