= 1727 British general election =

Election in Great Britain

- 14 August – 17 October 1727

All 558 seats in the House of Commons 280 seats needed for a majority

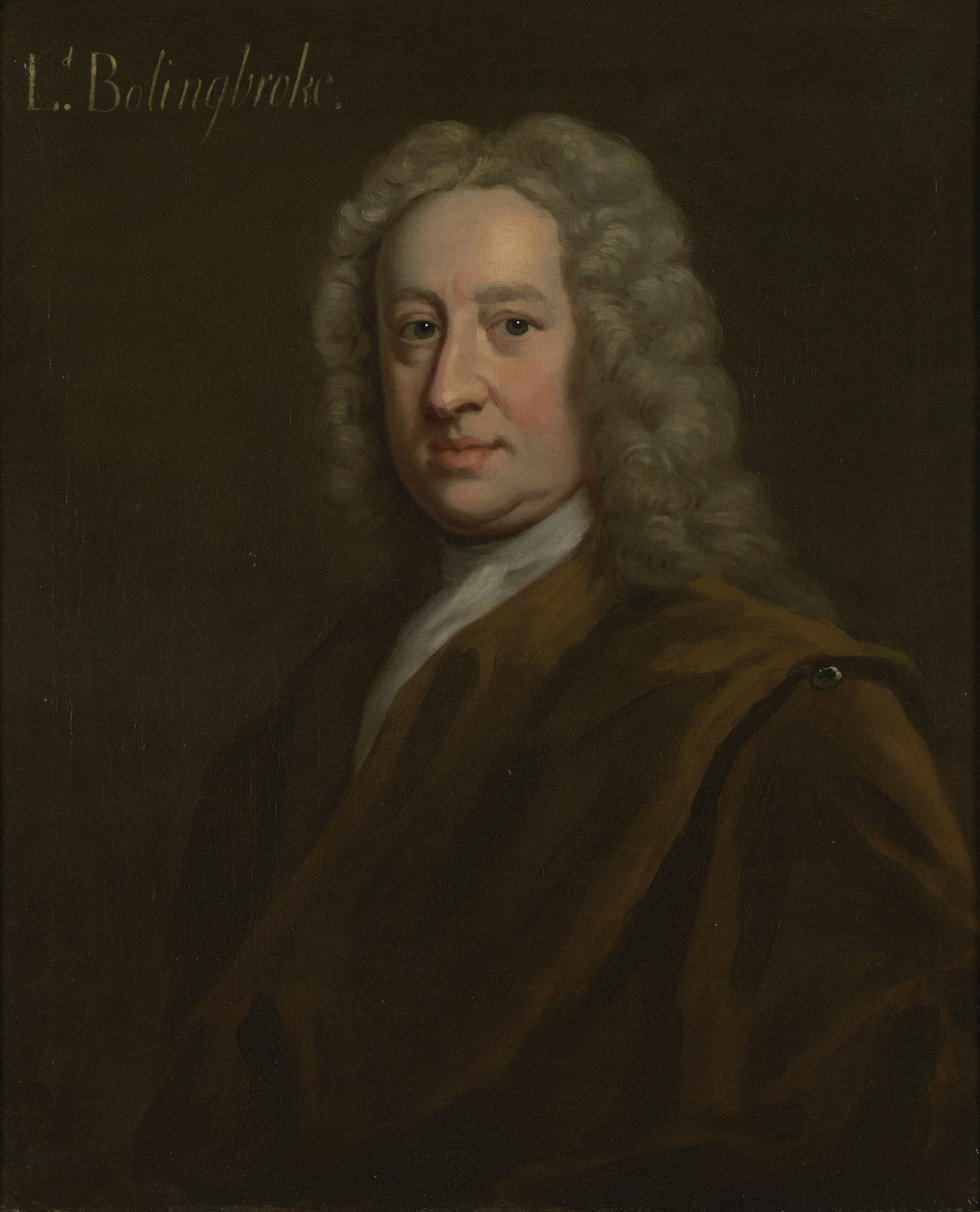

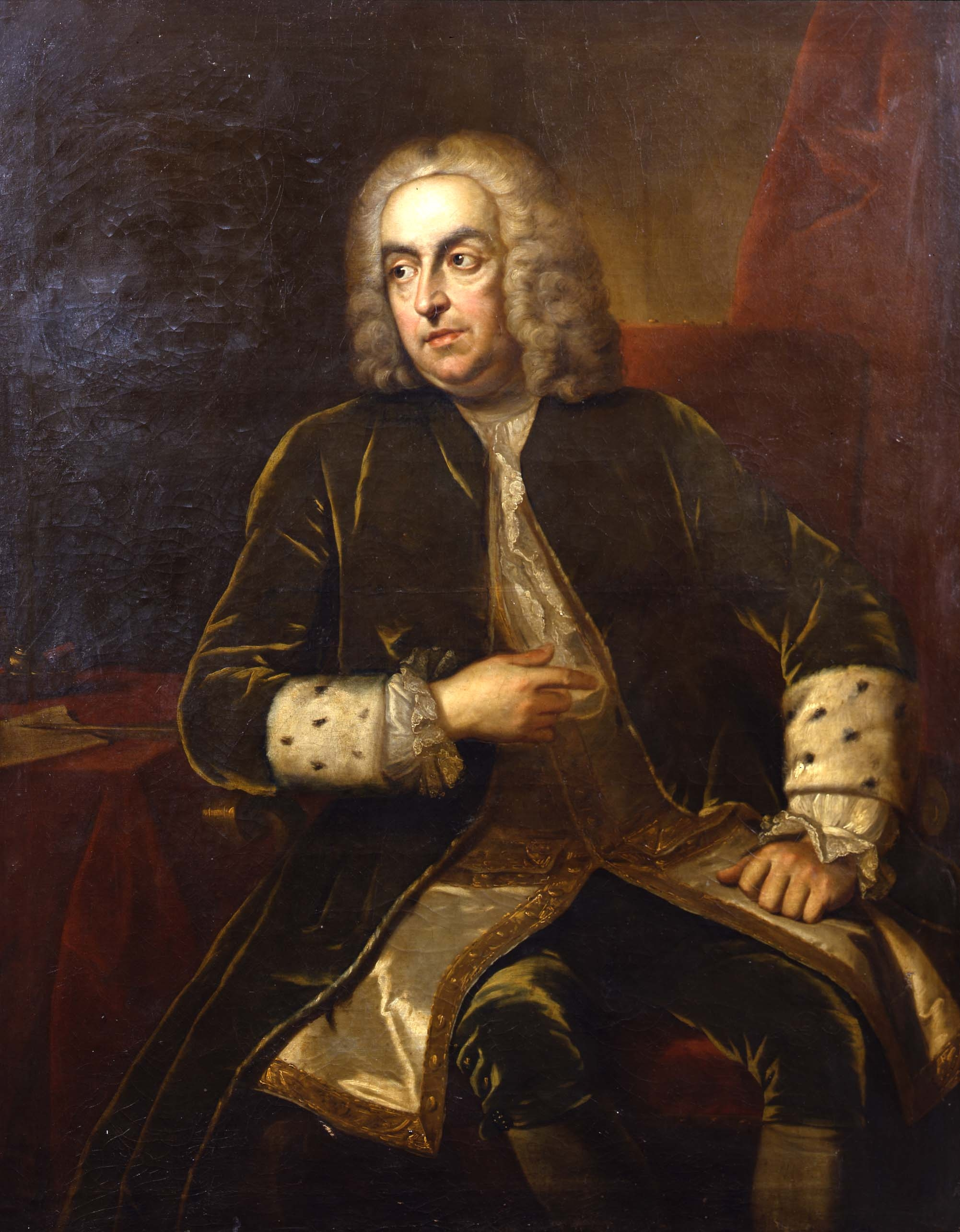
	First party	Second party	Third party
Leader	Sir Robert Walpole	Viscount Bolingbroke	William Pulteney
Party	Whig	Tory	Opposition / Patriot Whigs
Leader's seat	King's Lynn	House of Lords	Hedon
Seats won	415	128	15
Seat change	▲26	▼41	▲15
- Composition of the House of Commons after the election
Prime Minister before election
Sir Robert Walpole
Whig
Prime Minister after election
Sir Robert Walpole
Whig

The 1727 British general election returned members to serve in the House of Commons of the 7th Parliament of Great Britain to be summoned, after the merger of the Parliament of England and the Parliament of Scotland in 1707. The election was triggered by the death of King George I; at the time, it was the convention to hold new elections following the succession of a new monarch. The Tories, led in the House of Commons by William Wyndham, and under the direction of Bolingbroke, who had returned to the country in 1723 after being pardoned for his role in the Jacobite rising of 1715, lost further ground to the Whigs, rendering them ineffectual and largely irrelevant to practical politics. A group known as the Patriot Whigs, led by William Pulteney, who were disenchanted with Robert Walpole's government and believed he was betraying Whig principles, had been formed prior to the election. Bolingbroke and Pulteney had not expected the next election to occur until 1729, and were consequently caught unprepared. They failed to make any gains against the government party.

== Summary of the constituencies ==
See 1796 British general election for details. The constituencies used were the same throughout the existence of the Parliament of Great Britain.

== Dates of election ==
The general election was held between 14 August 1727 and 17 October 1727.

At this period, elections did not take place at the same time in every constituency. The returning officer in each county or parliamentary borough fixed the precise date (see hustings for details of the conduct of the elections).

== Results ==

=== Seats summary ===
Parliamentary seats
Whig	74.4%
Tory	22.9%
Patriot	2.7%

== See also ==
- List of parliaments of Great Britain
