= Joannes Corvus =

Flemish portrait painter

Joannes Corvus (fl. 1512 – 1544), or Johannes Corvus, was a Flemish portrait painter who was active in the 16th century.

== Biography ==
Corvus has been identified with Jan Rave, a native of Bruges, received master in that town in 1512, who subsequently came to England, and, like many of his fellow-countrymen, Latinised his name.

George Vertue was the first to discover his existence, finding the inscription Joannes Corvus Flandrus faciebat on the frame of a portrait of Bishop Fox, the founder, at Corpus Christi College, Oxford, which he engraved for Richard Fiddes's Life of Cardinal Wolsey. In 1820 this portrait was placed in a new frame, and the old frame was destroyed. Vertue's statement is authenticated by the existence of a portrait of Mary Tudor, the daughter of Henry VII, which has a frame and inscription similar to that of Bishop Fox, as described by Vertue. This picture, after being restored extensively, was in the possession of the Des Vœux family, and subsequently in the Dent collection. In this portrait there is a groundwork of gold showing through the colour of the dress, which is painted over it.

== Gallery ==
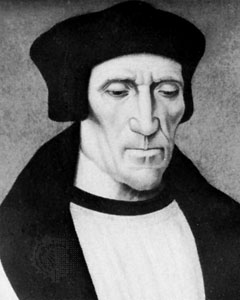
Richard Foxe
