= 1649 in poetry =

This article covers 1649 in poetry. Nationality words link to articles with information on the nation's poetry or literature (for instance, Irish or France).

== Works published ==
- Richard Brome, perhaps the editor, Lachrymae Musarum: The Tears of the Muses, anonymous collection of elegies on the death of Henry, Lord Hastings; assumed to have been assembled by Brome
- Richard Lovelace, Lucasta: Epodes, Odes, Sonnets, Songs, &c., to which is added Aramantha, A Pastoral., London: Tho. Harper (see also Lucasta: Posthume Poems 1659)
- John Ogilby, translator, The Works of Publius Virgilius Maro, translation from the original Latin, "a respectable and often sumptuously printed work [...] which, until [John] Dryden's folio [of 1697], was not superseded", according to 20th century critic Mark Van Doren
- Thomas Stanley, the elder, Europa. Cupid Crucified. Venus Vigils
- George Wither, Carmen Eucharisticon
- Elegies on the execution of King Charles I of England on January 30:
  - Henry King, A Groane at the Funerall of that Incomparable and Glorious Monarch, Charles the First
  - Thomas Pierce, anonymously, Caroli τοῦ μακαρίτου Παλιγγενεσία, 1649
  - Monumentum Regale, a Tombe for Charles I, collection

== Births ==
Death years link to the corresponding "[year] in poetry" article:

- April 16 – Jan Luyken (died 1712), Dutch
- September 26 – Katharyne Lescailje (died 1711), Dutch

== Deaths ==
Birth years link to the corresponding "[year] in poetry" article:

- June 20 – Maria Tesselschade Visscher (born 1594), Dutch
- December 4 – William Drummond of Hawthornden (born 1585), Scottish
- Richard Crashaw, (born 1613), English poet, styled "the divine," one of the Metaphysical poets
- Ascanio Pio (born unknown), Italian dramatic poet
- Jean Sirmond (born 1589), French neo-Latin poet and man of letters
- Manuel de Faria e Sousa (born 1590), Portuguese historian and poet
- Giovanni Valentini (born 1582), Italian Baroque composer, poet and keyboard virtuoso

== See also ==
- Poetry
- 17th century in poetry
- 17th century in literature
- Cavalier poets in England, who supported the monarch against the puritans in the English Civil War
