= G. A. S. =

G. A. S. may mean

- George Augustus Sala
- George Alexander Stevens
