= 1805 in poetry =

Nationality words link to articles with information on the nation's poetry or literature (for instance, Irish or France).

== Events ==
- January–September – Samuel Taylor Coleridge serves as Acting Public Secretary in Malta.
- William Wordsworth begins his first revision of The Prelude: or, Growth of a Poet's Mind in 13 Books, a version completed in 1806 and further revised later in his life. His work this year and next revises the original 1798-1799 version. The book is not published in any form until shortly after his death in 1850.

== Works published ==
=== United Kingdom ===
- Robert Anderson, Ballads in the Cumberland Dialect
- Henry Cary, translator, The Inferno of Dante Alighieri, parallel text
- Charlotte Dacre, Hours of Solitude
- George Ellis, editor, Specimens of Early English Metrical Romances (anthology)
- William Hayley, Ballads
- Charles Lamb, The King and Queen of Hearts, published anonymously; for children
- Sir Walter Scott, The Lay of the Last Minstrel
- Robert Southey, Madoc
- William Taylor, translation from the original German by G. E. Lessing, Nathan the Wise, first privately printed in 1791
- John Thelwall, The Trident of Albion, on the Battle of Trafalgar
- Mary Tighe, Psyche, or the Legend of Love
- William Wordsworth and Samuel Taylor Coleridge, Lyrical Ballads, with Pastoral and Other Poems, the last separate edition, with some variants in the poems; previous editions in 1798, 1801, 1802
- The Comic Adventures of Old Mother Hubbard and her Dog

=== United States ===
- Thomas Green Fessenden, Democracy Unveiled
- John Blair Linn, Valerian, A Narrative Poem: Intended, in Part, to Describe the Early Persecutions of Christians, and Rapidly to Illustrate the Influence of Christianity on the Manners of Nations, By John Blair Linn ... With a Sketch of the Life and Character of the Author, Philadelphia: Thomas and George Palmer
- Alexander Wilson, The Foresters

=== Other ===
- Adam Oehlenschlager, Poetiske Skrifter ("Poetic Writings"), prose and poetry, narrative cycles, drama, lyrics, ballads and romances, including "Aladdin", a philosophical fairy-tale drama in blank verse; Denmark
- Achim von Arnim and Clemens Brentano, edited and composed, Des Knaben Wunderhorn, vol. 1; Germany

== Births ==
Death years link to the corresponding "[year] in poetry" article:

- February 22 – Sarah Fuller Adams (died 1848), English
- March 20 – Thomas Cooper (died 1892), English Chartist, poet and religious lecturer
- May 26 – Joseph Grant (died 1835), Scottish

== Deaths ==
Birth years link to the corresponding "[year] in poetry" article:

- January 5 – Gottlob Burmann (born 1737), German poet and lipogrammatist
- May 9 – Friedrich Schiller (born 1759), German poet and dramatist
- August 3 – Christopher Anstey (born 1724) English writer and poet

== See also ==
- Poetry
- List of years in poetry
- List of years in literature
- 19th century in literature
- 19th century in poetry
- Romantic poetry
- Golden Age of Russian Poetry (1800–1850)
- Weimar Classicism period in Germany, commonly considered to have begun in 1788 and to have ended either in 1805, with the death of Friedrich Schiller, or 1832, with the death of Goethe
- List of poets

== Notes ==
- "A Timeline of English Poetry" Web page of the Representative Poetry Online Web site, University of Toronto
