= 1659 in poetry =

List of years in poetry	(table)
- … 1649; 1650; 1651; 1652; 1653; 1654; 1655; 1656; 1657; 1658; 1659; 1660; 1661; 1662; 1663; 1664; 1665; 1666; 1667; 1668; 1669 …
- In literature 1656 1657 1658 1659 1660 1661 1662
- Art; Archaeology; Architecture; Literature; Music; Philosophy; Science; +...

Nationality words link to articles with information on the nation's poetry or literature (for instance, Irish or France).

== Events ==
- January 27 – English poet Andrew Marvell is elected member of Parliament for Kingston upon Hull in the Third Protectorate Parliament.
- August – William Davenant is briefly imprisoned for his part in George Booth's Cheshire uprising.

== Works published ==
=== Great Britain ===
- William Chamberlayne, Pharonnida: A heroick poem
- John Cleveland, J. Cleaveland Revived: Poems, orations, epistles [...], prose and poetry (see also Clievelandi Vindiciae 1677)
- John Dryden, Edmund Waller, and Thomas Sprat, The Poems Upon the Death of His Late Highnesse Oliver Lord Protector of England, Scotland, and Ireland
- James Harrington, translator, Virgil's Aeneis: The Third, Fourth, Fifth and Sixth Books, translation from the Latin of Virgil's Aeneid
- Henry King, An Elegy Upon the Most Incomparable K. Charls the I, finished by March 11, 1649 but not printed until this year
- Richard Lovelace, Lucasta: Posthume poems (see Lucasta 1649)
- Thomas Sprat, The Plague of Athens, which Hapned in the Second Year of the Peloponnesian Warra
- Sir John Suckling, The Last Remains of Sr John Suckling, poetry and prose; published posthumously

=== Other ===
- Nicolaes Borremans et al. - De Bloemkrans van verscheidene gedichten door eenige liefhebbers der poezy byeenverzameld (anthology)
- Hallgrímur Pétursson - Passíusálmar (Passion Hymns)
- Jacob Steendam, Complaint of New Amsterdam in New Netherland, Dutch, Colonial American
- René Rapin, Eclogæ Sacræ, Paris; Latin-language poem written in France

== Births ==
Death years link to the corresponding "[year] in poetry" article:

- March – Margrethe Lasson, Danish poet and novelist (died 1738)
- April 29 – Sophia Elisabet Brenner (died 1730), Swedish writer, poet, feminist and salon hostess
- date not known
  - Thomas Creech (died 1700), English translator and scholar
  - Daniel Defoe (year between 1659 and 1661), (died 1731), English author, writer, journalist, spy and poet, probably while in hiding from his creditors. He is interred in Bunhill Fields, London, where his grave can still be visited.
  - Kata Szidónia Petrőczy (died 1708), Hungarian poet

== Deaths ==
Birth years link to the corresponding "[year] in poetry" article:

- February 11 – Guillaume Colletet (born 1598), French
- April 15 – Simon Dach (born 1605), Prussian German lyrical poet and hymn writer
- Akho (born 1591), Indian poet, Vedantist and radical
- Richard Johnson (born 1573), English romance writer, playwright, and poet
- Morgan Llwyd (born 1619), Welsh Puritan preacher, poet and prose writer
- Francisco de Rioja (born 1583), Spanish

== See also ==
- Poetry
- 17th century in poetry
- 17th century in literature
