= Dorothe Engelbretsdatter =

Norwegian writer

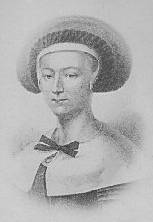
- Born: 16 January 1634; Bergen, Norway
- Died: 19 February 1716 (aged 82)
- Occupations: Poet and Hymn Writer
- Spouse: Ambrosius Hardenbeck
- Writing career
- Pen name: "Bergens Debora"
- Notable works: Siælens Sang-offer (1678); Taare-Offer (1685); Et kristeligt Valet fra Verden (1698)

Dorothe Engelbretsdatter (16 January 1634 – 19 February 1716) was a Norwegian author. She principally wrote hymns and poems which were strongly religious. She has been described as Norway's first recognized female author as well as Norway's first feminist before feminism became a recognized concept.

== Background ==
Dorothe Engelbretsdatter was born in Bergen, Norway. She was the daughter of Rector and Vicar, Engelbret Jørgenssøn (1592–1659) and Anna Wrangel. Her father was originally head of Bergen Cathedral School, and later dean of Bergen Cathedral. In her youth, Dorothe spent some time in Copenhagen. In 1652, she married Ambrosius Hardenbeck (1621–1683), a theological writer famous for his flowery funeral sermons, who succeeded her father at the Cathedral in 1659. They had five sons and four daughters.

== Career ==
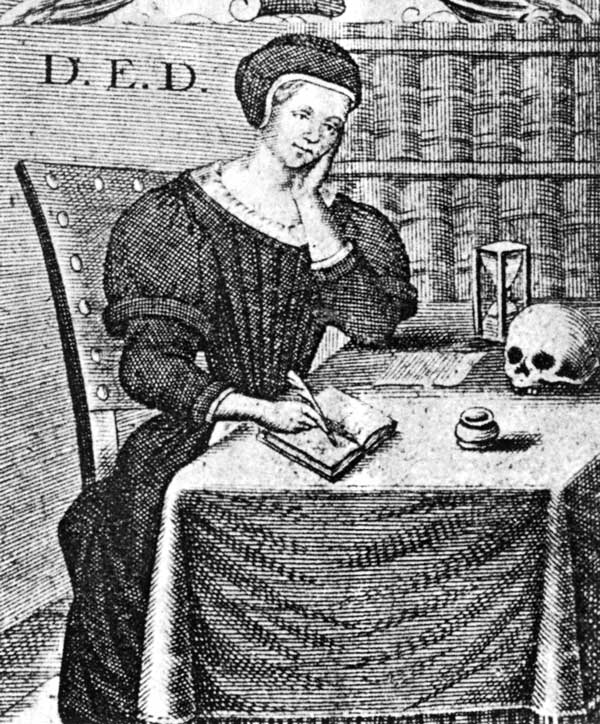
Title engraving of Taare-Offer (1685) showing Dorothe at work

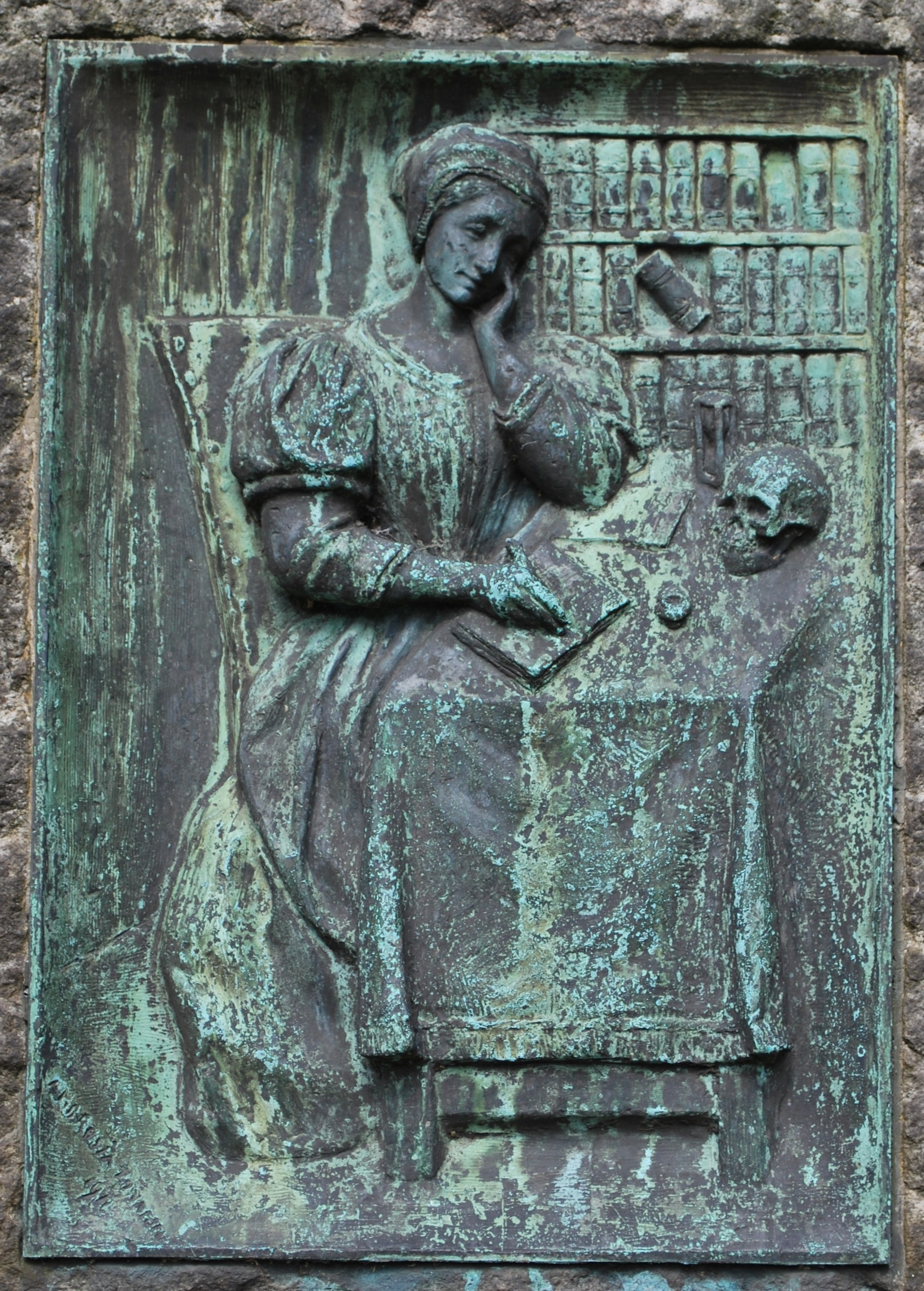
Relief by Ambrosia Tønnesen at Bergen Cathedral

In 1678 her first volume appeared: Siælens Sang-Offer ["The Soul's Song-Offering"], published at Copenhagen. This volume of hymns and devotional pieces, very modestly brought out, enjoyed unparalleled success. The first verses of Dorothe Engelbretsdatter are commonly believed to have been her best.

The fortunate poet was invited to Denmark, and on her arrival at Copenhagen was presented at court. She was also introduced to Thomas Hansen Kingo, the father of Danish poetry. The two greeted one another with improvised couplets, which have been preserved and of which Engelbretsdatter's reply "is incomparably the neater". King Christian V of Denmark-Norway granted her full tax freedom for life. Published in 1685, her Taare-Offer ["Tear-Offering"] was dedicated to Queen Charlotte Amalia, the wife of King Christian V.

In the midst of her troubles appeared her second work, the Taare-Offer, published for the first time in 1685. It is a continuous religious poem in four books. This was combined with Siælens Sang-Offer. In 1698 she brought out a third volume of sacred verse, Et kristeligt Valet fra Verden.

In 1683, her husband died. Of her nine children, seven died young, and her two adult sons lived far away from Bergen. She lost her house in the great fire of 1702, in which 90 percent of the city of Bergen was destroyed. Her replacement house was not available until 1712. Her sorrow is evident in examples such as the poem Afften Psalme. She died on 19 February 1716.

== Collected works ==
Her collected works were published in two volumes:

- Volume 1 (1955)
- Volume 2 (1956)

A new edition was released in 1999.

== See also ==
- Petter Dass
- Cille Gad
