= The Craftsman (newspaper) =

18th-century British newspaper

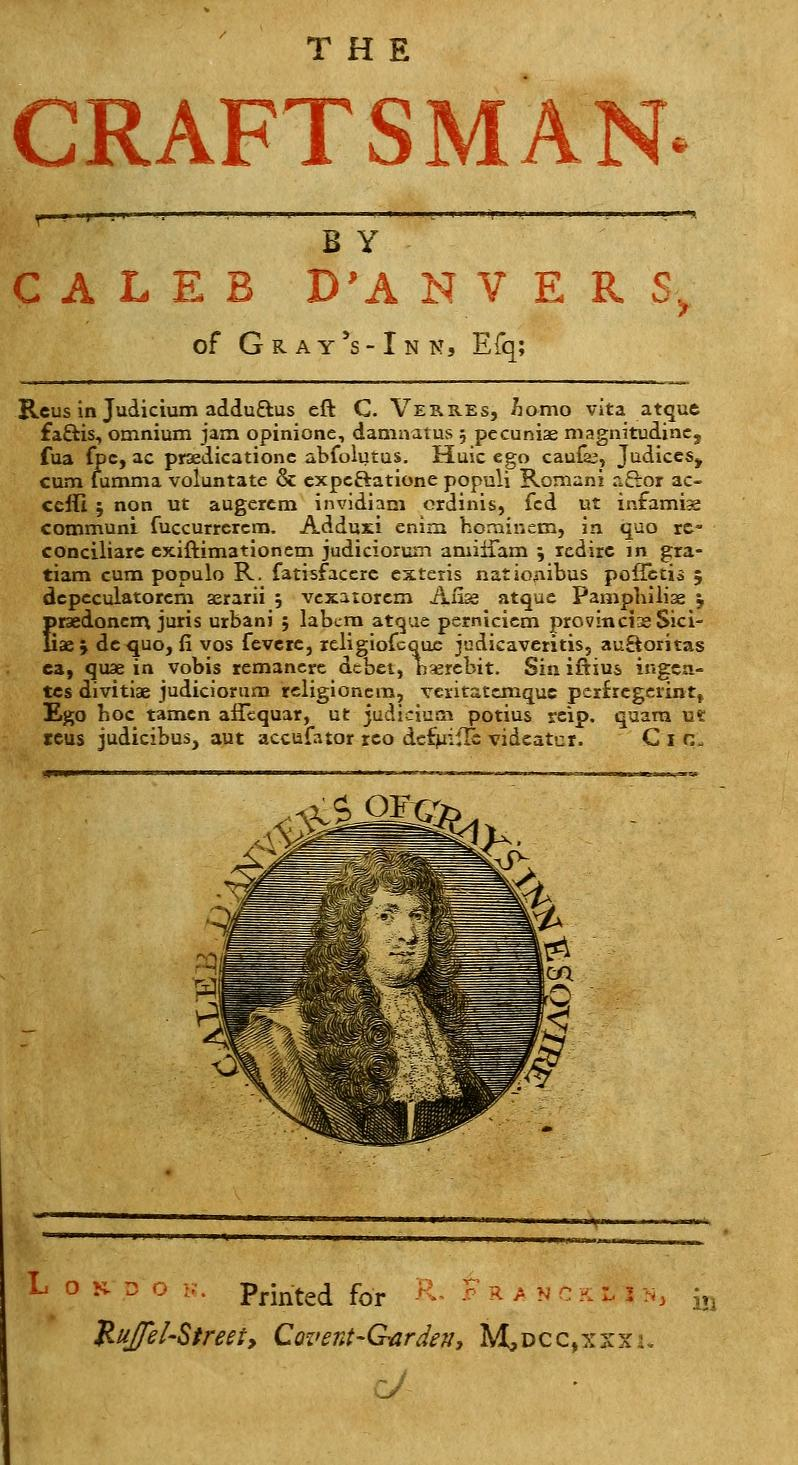
The Craftsman

The Craftsman, also known as The Country Journal or, The Craftsman or The Craftsman: Being a Critique on the Times, was a British newspaper which operated from 1726 to 1752. Established by Lord Bolingbroke and William Pulteney, it was edited by Nicholas Amhurst under the pseudonym "Caleb D'Anvers". It is known for publishing letters and essays from Lord Bolingbroke. Lord Bolingbroke and the Patriot Whigs used The Craftsman to oppose the administration of Robert Walpole and his 'Court Whig' faction. The paper's writers are claimed to have included early satirists, such as Jonathan Swift and Alexander Pope, although this is disputed.

In April 1740 the opposition essay-paper The Champion complained that the Craftsman had lifted its advertisement and ten news paragraphs verbatim.

== Sources ==
- Harris, Michael (1987). London Newspapers in the Age of Walpole: A Study of the Origins of the Modern English Press. Rutherford, NJ: Fairleigh Dickinson University Press.
- Varey, Simon (1993). "The Craftsman". Prose Studies. 16 (1): 58–77. doi:10.1080/01440359308586487.
- Ward, A. W. (26 June 2022). "The Craftsman and its Contributors". The Cambridge History of English and American Literature. Vol. IX. Cambridge University Press. Archived from the original on 25 August 2025.
- Yadav, Alok (2010). "The Craftsman (1726–1752) and Gray's-Inn Journal (1753–1754)". Historical Outline of Restoration and 18th-Century British Literature. Archived from the original on 28 March 2024.
