= Excise Bill =

Proposed British legislation

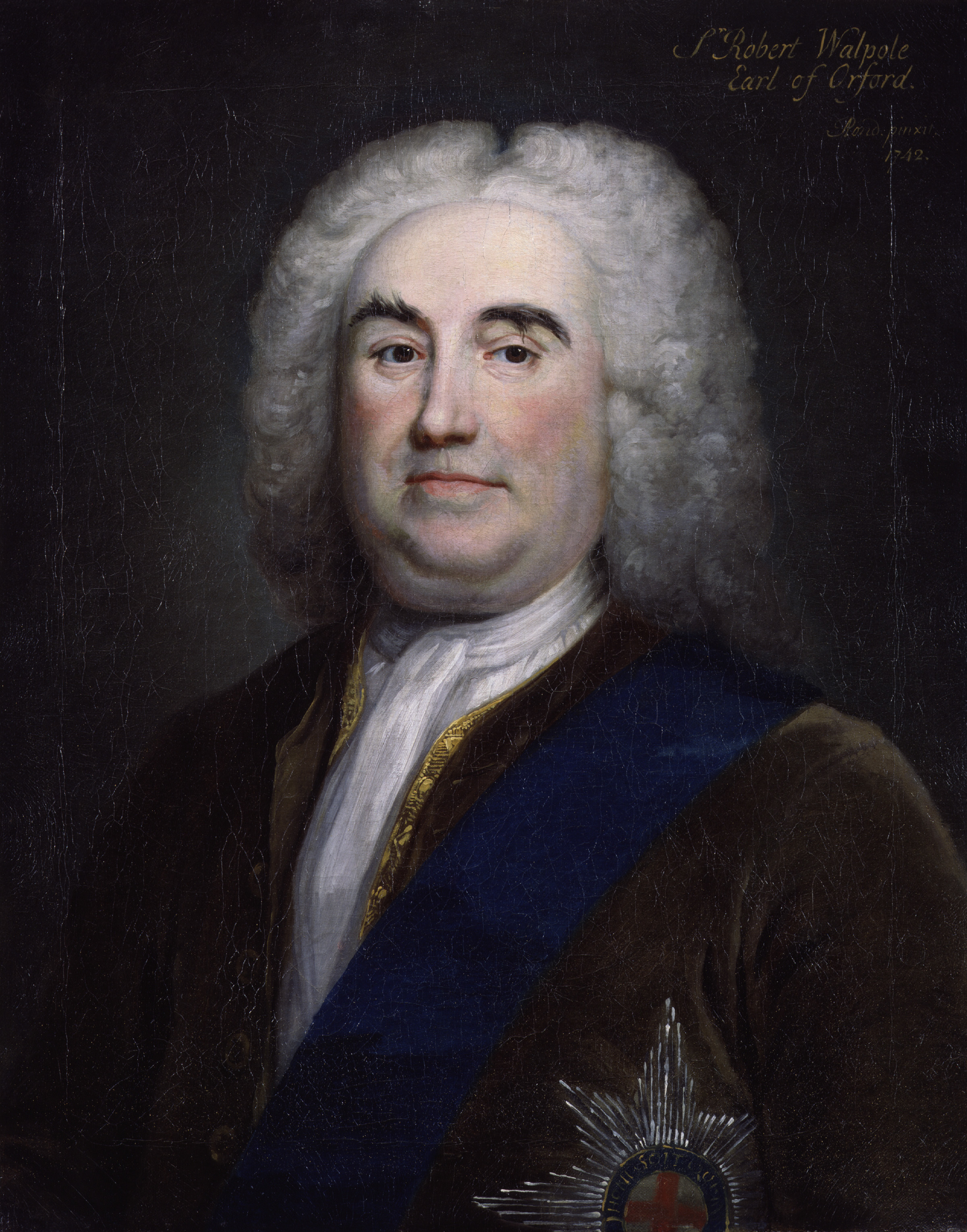
Prime Minister Robert Walpole proposed the bill at the height of his power. However opposition against it grew, and the proposal was eventually withdrawn.

The Excise Bill of 1733 was a proposal by the British government of Robert Walpole to impose an excise tax on a variety of products. This would have allowed Excise officers to search private dwellings to look for contraband untaxed goods. The perceived violation of the Rights of Englishmen provoked widespread opposition and the bill was eventually withdrawn. Whig opposition MP William Pitt took the lead in criticising the proposal, invoking the concept that an "Englishman's house is his castle".

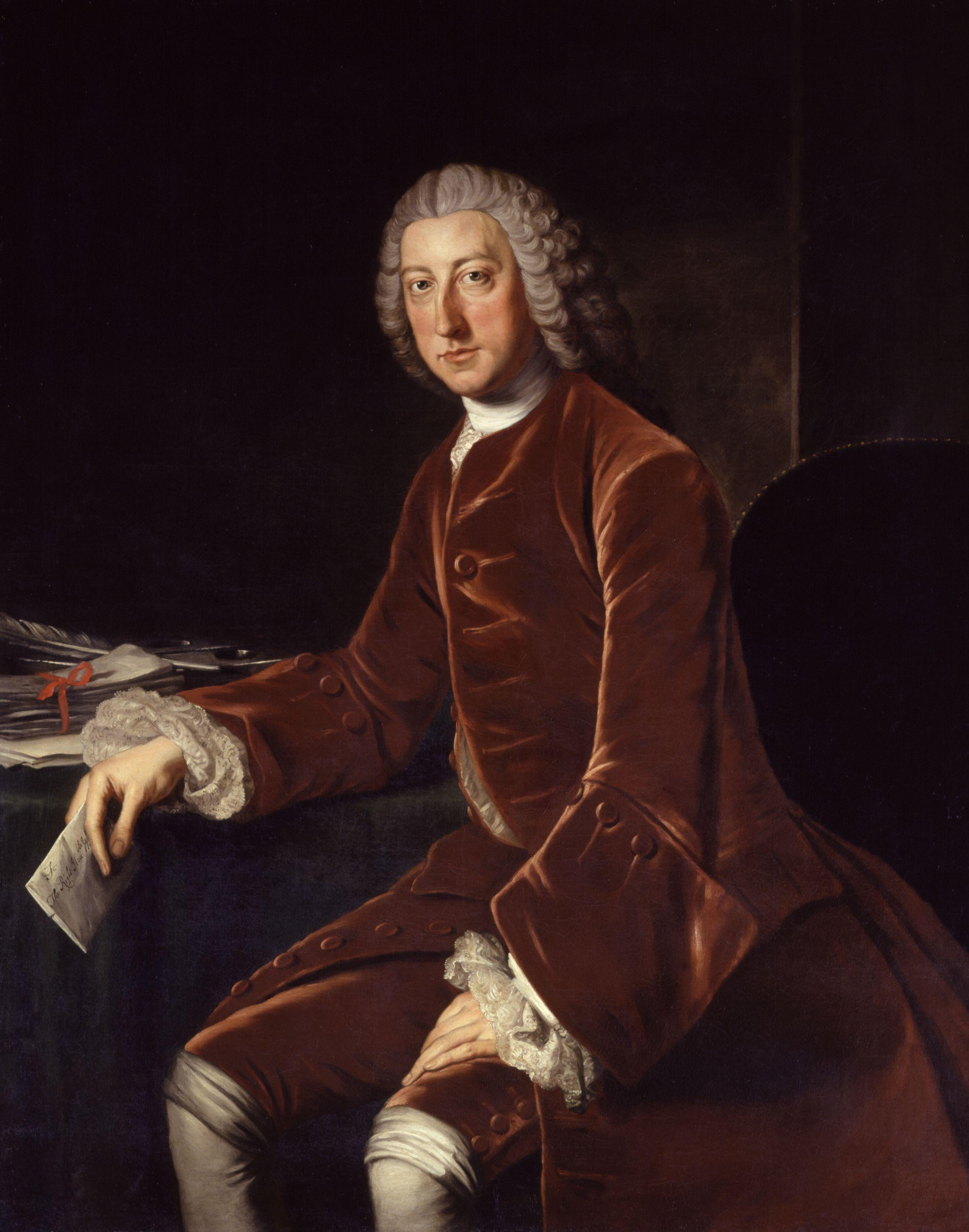
The rising politician William Pitt strongly opposed the bill, joining with an alliance of Tory and Patriot Whigs to defeat Walpole's proposal.

Walpole proposed the bill while at the height of his powers, during the Whig Ascendency, but its defeat was an early sign of the waning of his dominance over British politics which came to an end in 1742. Opposition Tory Mps were joined by the emerging Patriot Whigs to oppose the measure, signalling an alliance between these two forces.

== Aftermath ==
Much of the ideology and arguments used against the bill in Britain, later influenced American resistance to the Stamp Act. Like the opposition to the Excise Bill, this focused on the argument that governments had a right to tax external trade through customs, but not to interfere in private exchanges by British subjects.

== Bibliography ==
- Clark, J.; Erskine-Hill, H. (2001). Samuel Johnson in Historical Context. Springer.
- Langford, Paul (1975). The Excise Crisis: Society and Politics in the Age of Walpole. Clarendon Press.
- Slaughter, Thomas P. (1988). The Whiskey Rebellion: Frontier Epilogue to the American Revolution. Oxford University Press.
