= Winchcombe baronets =

Extinct baronetcy in the Baronetage of England

Winchcombe Baronets, of Bucklebury
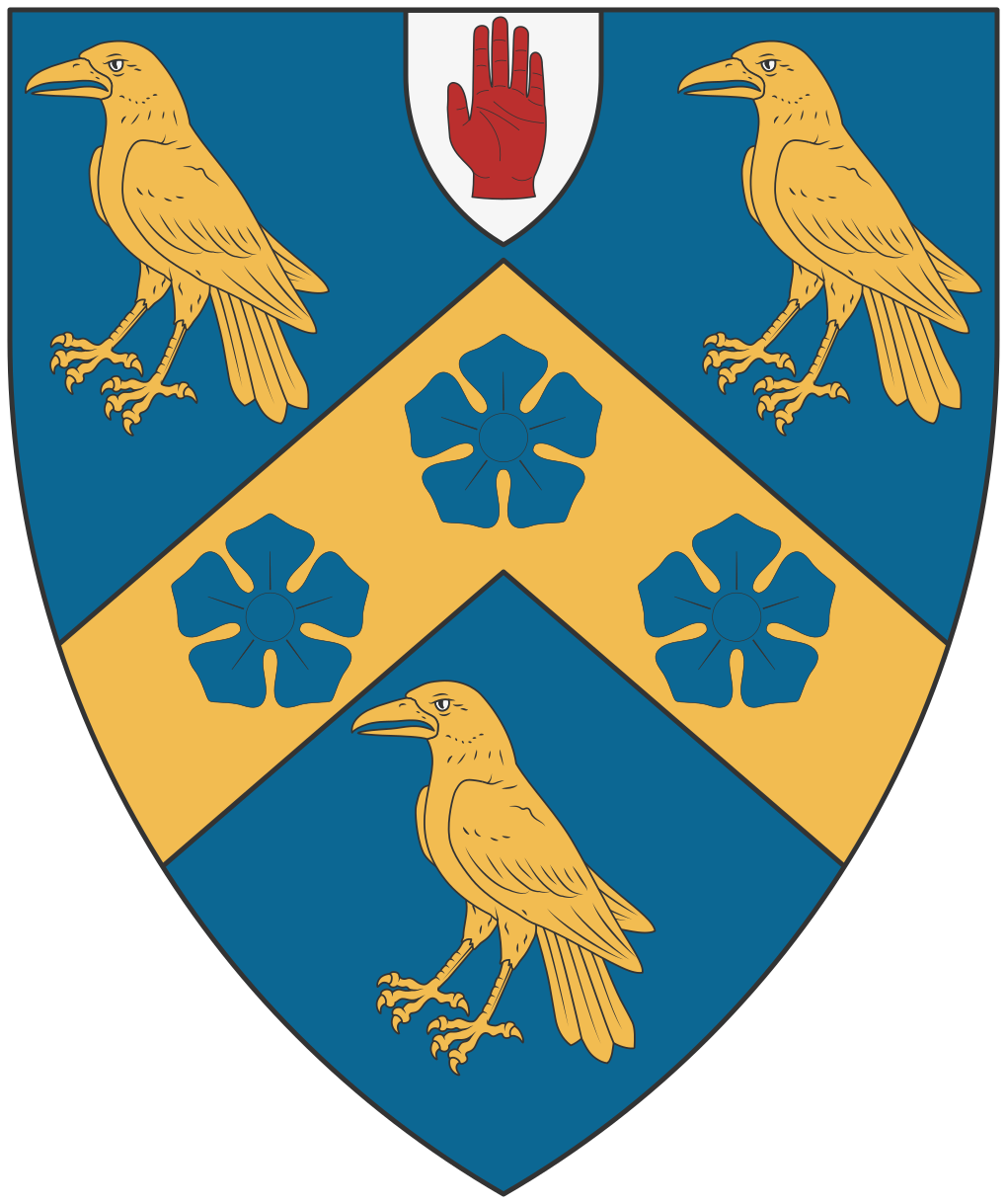
- Arms: Az. on a chev. engr. between three Cornish choughs or, as many cinquefoils of the first.

The Winchcombe Baronetcy, of Bucklebury in the County of Berkshire, was a title in the Baronetage of England. It was created on 18 June 1661 for Henry Winchcombe. The second Baronet sat as Member of Parliament for Berkshire. The title became extinct on his death in 1703. The Winchcombe estates passed to his eldest daughter, Frances Winchcombe, wife of Henry St John, 1st Viscount Bolingbroke.

== Winchcombe baronets, of Bucklebury (1661) ==
- Sir Henry Winchcombe, 1st Baronet (1641–1667)
- Sir Henry Winchcombe, 2nd Baronet (1659–1703)
