= 1700 in poetry =

This article covers 1700 in poetry. Nationality words link to articles with information on the nation's poetry or literature (for instance, Irish or France).

== Works published ==
- Sir Richard Blackmore — A Satyr Against Wit, published anonymously; an attack on the "Wits", including John Dryden
- Samuel Cobb — Poetae Britannici his most famous poem, a survey of previous English poetry in a light style, clear diction, and imagery that later critics like John Nichols considered "sublime"

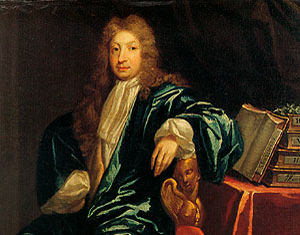
John Dryden died this year

- Daniel Defoe — The Pacificator, published anonymously, verse satire in the literary war between the "Men of Sense" and the "Men of Wit"
- John Dryden — Fables, Ancient and Modern, the poet's final anthology
- William King — The Transactioneer With Some of his Philosophical Fancies, published anonymously, a satire on Sir Hans Sloane, editor of the Philosophical Transactions of the Royal Society
- John Pomfret — Reason
- Nahum Tate — Panacea, a poem upon tea
- John Tutchin — The Foreigners, published anonymously; provoked a reply from Daniel Defoe in The True-Born Englishman in 1701
- Edward Ward — The Reformer, published anonymously
- Samuel Wesley — An Epistle to a Friend concerning Poetry
- Thomas Yalden — The Temple of Fame
- Anonymous — Jaħasra Mingħajr Ħtija, Gozo

== Births ==
Death years link to the corresponding "[year] in poetry" article:

- February 2 – Johann Christoph Gottsched (died 1766), German poet
- January 14 – Christian Friedrich Henrici (died 1764), German poet
- May 26 – Nikolaus Ludwig von Zinzendorf (died 1760), German poet
- September 11 – James Thomson (died 1748), Scottish poet
- September 30 – Stanisław Konarski, born Hieronim Konarski (died 1773), Polish pedagogue, educational reformer, political writer, poet, dramatist, Piarist friar and precursor of the Polish Enlightenment
- October 13 – Phanuel Bacon (died 1783) English playwright, poet and author
- Also – David French (died 1742), English Colonial American poet
- Year uncertain – Richard Lewis (died 1734), English Colonial American poet

== Deaths ==
Birth years link to the corresponding "[year] in poetry" article:

- March 14 – Henry Killigrew (born 1613), English clergyman, poet and playwright
- May 12 – John Dryden (born 1631), English poet, former Poet Laureate
- July 19 – Thomas Creech (born 1659), English translator of classical poetry, found dead this day from suicide
- November 16 – Jamie Macpherson (born 1675), Scottish outlaw, famed for his lament, hanged
- Also:
  - Francisco Antonio de Fuentes y Guzmán (born 1643), Guatemalan historian and poet
  - Bahinabai (born 1628), Maharashtran Varkari female poet-saint
  - Edward Howard died about this year (born 1624), English playwright and poet, brother of Sir Robert Howard

== See also ==
- Poetry
- List of years in poetry
- 17th century in poetry
- 17th century in literature
- 18th century in poetry
- 18th century in literature
