= 1624 in poetry =

This article covers 1624 in poetry. Nationality words link to articles with information on the nation's poetry or literature (for instance, Irish or France).

== Works published ==
- Anonymous, Loves Garland; or, Posies for Rings, Handkerchers, and Gloves, anthology
- George Chapman, translator, Batrachomyomachia, publication year uncertain; the original work had been wrongly ascribed to Homer in antiquity; the book contains hymns and epigrams also not written by Homer
- Thomas Heywood, Gynaikeion; or, Nine Bookes of Various History. Concerninge Women, partly in verse
- Francis Quarles:
  - Job Militant: With meditations divine and morall
  - Sions Elegies, Wept by Jeremie the Prophet (see also Sions Sonnets 1625)

== Births ==
Death years link to the corresponding "[year] in poetry" article:

- August 22 – Jean Renaud de Segrais (died 1701), French poet and novelist
- October 26 – Dosoftei (died 1693), Moldavian Metropolitan, scholar, poet and translator
- December 25 – Johannes Scheffler, also known as "Angelus Silesius" (died 1677), German poetry mystic and poet
- date not known – Edward Howard (died 1700), playwright and poet, brother of Sir Robert Howard

== Deaths ==
Birth years link to the corresponding "[year] in poetry" article:

- Yuan Zhongdao (born 1570), Chinese poet, essayist, travel diarist and official

== See also ==
- Poetry
- 16th century in poetry
- 16th century in literature
