= 1701 in poetry =

Nationality words link to articles with information on the nation's poetry or literature (for instance, Irish or France).

== Events ==
- Matthew Prior, English poet, enters Parliament.

== Works published ==
=== Great Britain ===
- Mary Chudleigh The Ladies Defence; or, The Bride-woman's Counsellor Answer'd
- Daniel Defoe, The True-born Englishman: A satyr, published anonymously this year, but dated "1700"; inspired by John Tutchin's The Foreigners (1700), and answered by Tuchin (anonymously) in his The Apostates, this year; Defoe's poem also resulted in many other responses, adaptations and attacks
- John Dennis, Advancement and Reformation of Modern Poetry (criticism)
- John Dryden, Poems on Various Occasions; and Translations from Several Authors (posthumous)
- Charles Gildon, A New Miscellany of Original Poems (anthology), includes "The Spleen" and other poems by Anne Finch, countess of Winchilsea
- Cotton Mather, Consolations, English, Colonial America (Massachusetts)
- John Philips:
  - The Splendid Shilling
  - The Sylvan Dream; or, The Mourning Muses, published anonymously, usually attributed to Philips
- John Wilmot, Earl of Rochester, Poems on Several Occasions. By the R. H. the E. of R., London: Printed for A. T.

=== Other ===
- Nicolas Boileau-Despréaux, l'Œuvres diverses ("Diverse Works"), France

== Births ==
Death years link to the corresponding "[year] in poetry" article:

- Matthew Concanen (died 1749), Irish-born English poet and writer
- Matthew Pilkington (died 1774), Irish art historian and satirist
- James Sterling (died 1763), English Colonial American poet

== Deaths ==
Birth years link to the corresponding "[year] in poetry" article:

- February – Miguel de Barrios (born 1625), Spanish poet and historian
- March 15 – Jean Renaud de Segrais (born 1624), French poet and novelist
- August 20 – Sir Charles Sedley (born 1639), English wit, dramatist, poet and statesman
- August 24 – Ahasverus Fritsch (born 1629), German poet and legal writer
- August 31 – Samuel Chappuzeau (born 1625), French scholar, author, poet and playwright
- Shah Inayatullah (born 1613), poet from Sindh, Pakistan

== See also ==
- Poetry
- List of years in poetry
- 18th century in poetry
- 18th century in literature
