= 1711 in poetry =

This article covers 1711 in poetry. Nationality words link to articles with information on the nation's poetry or literature (for instance, Irish or France).

== Works published ==
- Sir Richard Blackmore, published anonymously, The Nature of Man
- John Dryden, translator, Metamorphoses, translated from the Latin original of Ovid
- William King, An Historical Account of the Heathen Gods and Heroes
- Alexander Pope, An Essay on Criticism
- Jonathan Swift, editor, Miscellanies in Prose and Verse, anthology, including 25 works by Swift
- Edward Ward, The Life and Notable Adventures of that Renown'd Knight Don Quixote de la Mancha (originally published in six monthly parts, 1710–1711)
- James Watson (Scottish editor), editor, Choice Collection of Comic and Serious Scots Poems, Edinburgh (published from 1706 to 1711)

== Births ==
Death years link to the corresponding "[year] in poetry" article:

- January 15 – Sidonia Hedwig Zäunemann (died 1740), German
- March 22 – Samuel Gotthold Lange (died 1781), German
- April 10 – John Gambold (died 1771), Welsh-born religious poet and bishop of the Moravian Church.
- May – Henry Taylor (died 1785), Church of England clergyman, religious writer and poet
- May 18 – Ruđer Bošković (died 1787), Ragusan polymath and poet
- October 17 – Jupiter Hammon (died sometime before 1806), English Colonial African American

== Deaths ==
Birth years link to the corresponding "[year] in poetry" article:

- March 13 – Nicolas Boileau-Despréaux (born 1636), French poet and critic
- September 4 – John Caryll (born 1625), exiled English poet, dramatist, and diplomat
- Cille Gad (born 1675), Norwegian female poet and scholar, of plague

== See also ==
- Poetry
- List of years in poetry
- List of years in literature
- 18th century in poetry
- 18th century in literature
- Augustan poetry

== Notes ==
- "A Timeline of English Poetry" Web page of the Representative Poetry Online Web site, University of Toronto
