= Manko (poet) =

18th century Japanese poet

Manko (万乎; ? - August 15, 1724) was a Japanese haikai poet of the middle Edo period. He was a wealthy merchant in Ueno, Iga Province, now known as Mie. He is best known for his relationship with Matsuo Bashō and for his poetry.

On April 3, 1691, Manko met Bashō and led him to his residence, where the former became a pupil. In total, some sixty of his verses were published. His main contributions can be found in Sarumino (1691), Sumidawara (1694), and Zoku-sarumino (1698).

== See also ==
- Matsuo Bashō
