= Richard Fiddes =

English Anglican priest and historian

Richard Fiddes (1671–1725) was an English Anglican priest and historian.

== Life ==
He was born at Hunmanby and educated at Oxford University. He took orders, and obtained the living of Halsham in Holderness in 1696. Owing to ill-health he applied for leave to reside at Wickham near Scarborough, North Yorkshire, and in 1712 he removed to London on the plea of poverty, intending to pursue a literary career.

In London he met Jonathan Swift, who procured him a chaplaincy at Hull. He also became chaplain to the earl of Oxford. After losing the Hull chaplaincy through a change of ministry in 1714, he devoted himself to writing. His best book is a Life of Cardinal Wolsey (London, 1724), containing documents which are still valuable for reference; of his other writings the Prefatory Epistle containing some remarks to be published on Homer's Iliad (London, 1714), was occasioned by Alexander Pope's proposed translation of the Iliad, and his Theologia speculativa (London, 1718), earned him the degree of D.D. at Oxford. In his own day he had a considerable reputation as an author and man of learning.
