= Patriot Whigs =

British political faction

- Leader: Earl of Bath; William Pitt, 1st Earl of Chatham; William Pitt the Younger
- Founder: Earl of Bath
- Founded: 1725; 301 years ago
- Dissolved: 1803; 223 years ago
- Merged into: Mainstream Whig Party; Pittites
- Ideology: Whiggism; Anti-Walpole ministry; Anti-nepotism; Anti-corruption
- National affiliation: Whigs

The Patriot Whigs, later the Patriot Party, were a group within the Whig Party in Great Britain from 1725 to 1803. The group was formed in opposition to the government of Robert Walpole in the House of Commons in 1725, when William Pulteney (later 1st Earl of Bath) and seventeen other Whigs joined with the Tory Party in attacks against the ministry. By the mid-1730s, there were over one hundred opposition Whigs in the Commons, many of whom embraced the Patriot label. For many years, they provided a more effective opposition to the Walpole administration than the Tories were.

== Reasons for opposition to Walpole ==
The Whig Patriots believed that under Walpole, the executive had grown too powerful by the abuse of patronage and government placemen in the Parliament of Great Britain. They also accused Walpole personally of being too partisan, too important and too eager to keep competent potential rivals out of positions of influence. He was further suspected of enriching himself from the public purse. Discontent with Walpole among his fellow Whigs had first been brought to a crisis with the South Sea Bubble and his role as a "screen" to the South Sea directors, as well as the fact that he had made a profit despite the crash. Under Queen Anne, the Tories had sent Walpole to the Tower of London for misappropriations as Secretary at War, and even radical Whigs such as John Tutchin had publicly accused him of siphoning off money.

== Hostility towards Spain and France ==
As self-declared "patriots", the Patriot Whigs were often critical of Britain's foreign policy, especially under the first two kings of the House of Hanover. Many were convinced that the traditional Whig policy, "No Peace Without Spain", had been correct and that Spain and France were potentially dangerous to Britain. In 1739, their attacks in Parliament against the Walpole ministry's policy toward Spain helped stir up widespread public anger, which led to the War of Jenkins' Ear and ultimately to Walpole's fall three years later, during the War of the Austrian Succession.

== The newspaper of the party and opposition to Caroline of Ansbach ==
An early focus for the Whig Patriots was The Craftsman, a newspaper founded in 1726 by Pulteney and Henry St. John, Viscount Bolingbroke, the former Tory minister, who for a decade called for a "country" party coalition of non-Jacobite Tories and opposition Whigs to defeat Walpole and the Court Whigs. Jonathan Swift, Alexander Pope, John Gay, and Henry Fielding all wrote for The Craftsman. Bolingbroke's The Idea of a Patriot King (1738; published 1749) adopted the language of "patriotism" to critique political theories used by Walpole and his successors to justify their actions. Many of the anti-Walpolean satires of the 1730s mixed Tory and Patriot Whig stances, and some authors, such as Henry Carey, simultaneously satirized Queen Caroline for her backing of Walpole and penned patriotic operas and songs such as Rule, Britannia! and God Save the King.

== Support for William Pitt the Elder and Pitt the Younger ==
The Patriot Whigs never achieved power while Walpole remained in office, and their cohesion was undermined in 1742, when some of their leaders joined the government after Walpole's fall, and Pulteney was elevated to the House of Lords. However, William Pitt the Elder would gather around himself the "Patriot Party", and even in office, he continued to use the language of the Patriot Whigs. The remnants of those who identified as Patriots would later join the unofficial "party" of his son, William Pitt the Younger. Over the decades, those associations would contribute significant personnel and Parliamentary support to government ministries.

== See also ==
- Whig Split, a division in the party between 1717 and 1720
