= Charles-François d'Iberville =

French aristocrat and diplomat

De La Bonde's coronet

Charles-François d'Iberville, marquis de La Bonde (1653–1723) was a French aristocrat and diplomat.

After serving in the Republic of Geneva, Republic of Genoa, Mainz and Spain, he was posted by King Louis XIV as Ambassador to the Court of St James's from 1713 until 1717.

== See also ==
- List of Ambassadors of France to the United Kingdom
