= Agatha Lovisa de la Myle =

Agatha Lovisa de la Myle née Brumengeber or Brunnengräber (30 August 1724 – 1 September 1787), was a Finnish (originally Baltic German) poet and correspondent, "lady of letters".

Born in Courland as the daughter of the clergyman Anders Brumengeber, she married her nephew Captain Carl Johan de la Myle in 1750, and moved to the Swedish province of Finland with him in 1762.

She wrote poetry in German and Latvian, and was said to "unite a lively sense of religion and virtue with the gifts of a genius". She was also known for her correspondence with, among others, Professor Gellert in Leipzig. She published "Lofqväden" in dedication to the coronation and revolution of King Gustav III of Sweden.

She died on her estate Maanpää Manor outside Turku in Finland in 1787.
