= Gottlob Burmann =

German Romantic poet and Lipogrammatist

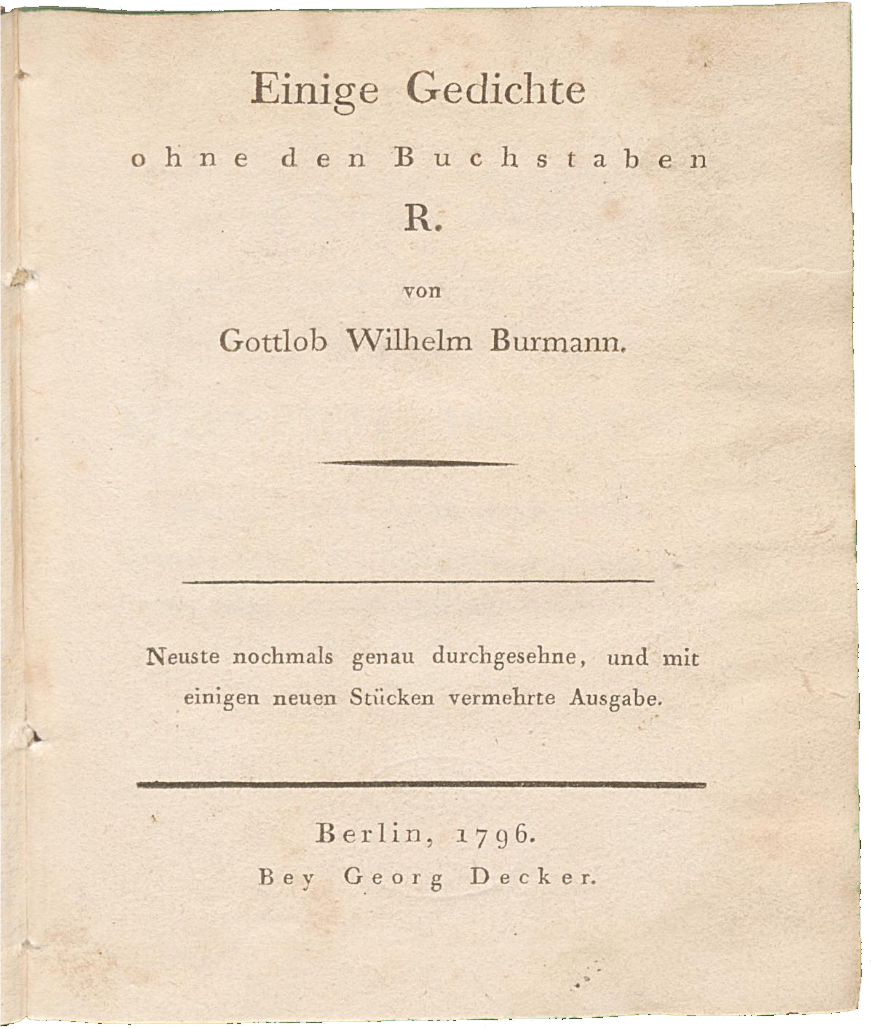
Gedichte ohne den Buchstaben R., Berlin, 1796.

Gottlob Wilhelm Burmann (18 May 1737 in Lauban – 5 January 1805) was a German Romantic poet and lipogrammatist. He is best known for his dislike of the letter R. The letter does not appear in any of his 130 poems. He even eliminated it from his daily speech, refusing to say his last name for over seventeen years.
