= Cille Gad =

Norwegian poet

Cille Gad (1675-1711) was a Norwegian poet and cultural personality. She was also well known as a female academic, something regarded as notable by her contemporaries.

== Biography ==
Cille Gad was born and grew up in Bergen, Norway. She was the daughter of Knud Gad (d. 1711) and Anna Abrahamsdatter. Her father was a printer and auditor, and her mother was a cousin of Dorothe Engelbretsdatter. She received instruction in Greek, Latin, and Hebrew from her father.

She early wrote poems in Latin, but they were presumably destroyed by the great fire of Bergen in 1702. In 1705, she secretly gave birth to a fetus which was found dead. She was arrested, but her correspondent Otto Sperling appealed to the monarch that a learned female should not be executed. She was released in 1707 and banished from Bergen. In 1708 she was at the University of Copenhagen. From 1708, she lived in Copenhagen and socialized in the learned circles around the university and was known as a poet. She died unmarried in 1711, probably of the plague.

== Legacy ==
She is believed to have been the inspiration for till Zille Hans Dotters Gynaicologia eller Forsvars Skrift for Qvinde-Kiønnet by Ludvig Holberg (1722). Her name was included in a dictionary of learned women by Otto Sperling, to whom she also dedicated poems.
