= Angom Gopi =

Indian writer (1710–1780)

Angom Gopi or Angom Chaoba (1710–1780) was a writer from the Kingdom of Manipur. He was responsible for translating many works of Bengali and Sanskrit literature into Meitei (Meiteilon). He also wrote Meetei poetry.

Angom Gopi had also translated Parikshit of the Mahabharata by Gangadas Sen from Bengali. He had also translated Uttara Kanda. In the years that followed Yubaraja Nabananda had translated Virat Parva of Ram Krishnadas from Bengali. This was followed by the translation of Gangadas Sen's Aswamedha Parva from the Mahabharata written in Bengali into Meitei by Longjam Parshuram in the last part of 18th century.

Another landmark in translation during this period was the translation of Govinda Mishra Pandit's Srimad Bhagavat Gita, originally in Bengali, by Parshuram. It is said that the Meitei version of the Bible was published at Serampore (West Bengal) in 1824.

The language used in these translation works is Old Meitei interlarded with Sanskrit, which is very beautiful and is in verse form. However, the words used by Parshuram to express the spiritual and eternal matters are mostly Sanskrit and Bengali which are very hard to understand by the common people.

He was working in the court of King Pamheiba (1709 - 1748 AD).
