= Abel Evans =

Abel Evans (1675–1737) was an English clergyman, academic, poet, and a self-conscious follower of John Milton.

== Life ==
He was son of Abel Evans of London, and was baptised on 26 February 1675. He entered Merchant Taylors' School in 1685. He was elected probationary fellow of St. John's College, Oxford (1692), proceeded regularly to the degrees of B.A. (1696), M.A. (1699), B.D. (1705), D.D. (1711).

He entered holy orders in 1700, and held successively the incumbencies of Kirtlington, St. Giles, Oxford, and Great Staughton, Huntingdonshire. For a short, time also he was chaplain to his college. He was removed, according to Thomas Hearne, because, in a speech made publicly in the hall of St. John's, he reflected upon William Delaune, the President, and most of the Fellows. The Duchess of Marlborough supported him, and he was reinstated in his office.

Evans was presented by his college in 1725 to the rectory of Cheam, Surrey, and died there 18 October 1737.

== Works ==
Turning on former friends, he published (1710) a poem entitled The Apparition; a dialogue betwixt the Devil and a Doctor concerning the rights of the Christian Church, in which Matthew Tindal and White Kennett were roughly handled. In 1713 Evans published a poetical epistle to the botanist Jacob Bobart the Younger, entitled Vertumnus. Præ-existence (1714) was in Milton's style.
