= Henry St John, 1st Viscount Bolingbroke =

British politician and philosopher (1678–1751)

The Right Honourable The Viscount Bolingbroke PC
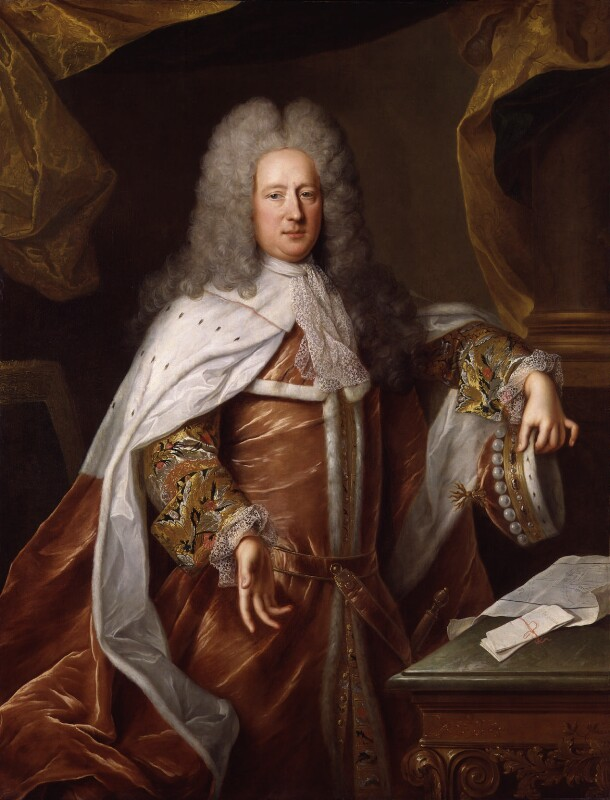
- c. 1712 portrait of Bolingbroke attributed to Alexis Simon Belle

Secretary of State for the Southern Department
- In office 17 August 1713 – 31 August 1714
- Monarchs: Anne; George I
- Preceded by: The Earl of Dartmouth
- Succeeded by: James Stanhope

Secretary of State for the Northern Department
- In office 21 September 1710 – 17 August 1713
- Monarch: Anne
- Preceded by: Henry Boyle
- Succeeded by: William Bromley

Secretary at War
- In office 1704–1708
- Monarch: Anne
- Preceded by: George Clarke
- Succeeded by: Robert Walpole

Jacobite Secretary of State
- In office July 1715 – March 1716
- Monarch: James Francis Edward Stuart
- Preceded by: Thomas Higgons
- Succeeded by: John Erskine, Earl of Mar

Personal details
- Born: Henry St. John; 16 September 1678 Battersea, Surrey; England
- Died: 12 December 1751 (aged 73) Battersea, London, Great Britain
- Party: Tory
- Spouses: Frances Winchcombe; Marie Claire des Champs
- Parents: Henry St. John, 1st Viscount of St. John; Lady Mary Rich

Arms of St John: Argent, on a chief gules two mullets or

Henry St. John, 1st Viscount Bolingbroke (16 September 1678 – 12 December 1751) was a British Tory politician and philosopher. He was a leader of the Tories, and supported the Church of England politically despite his antireligious views and opposition to theology. Bolingbroke supported the Jacobite rebellion of 1715, which sought to overthrow the new king George I. Escaping to France, he became foreign minister for the Jacobite pretender James Francis Edward Stuart. He was attainted for treason but reversed course and was allowed to return to England in 1723. According to Ruth Mack, "Bolingbroke is best known for his party politics, including the ideological history he disseminated in The Craftsman (1726–1735) by adopting the formerly Whig theory of the Ancient Constitution and giving it new life as an anti-Walpole Tory principle."

== Early life ==
Henry St John was most probably born at Lydiard Tregoze, the family seat in Wiltshire, and christened in Battersea. St John was the son of Sir Henry St John, 4th Baronet later 1st Viscount St John, and Lady Mary Rich, daughter of the 3rd Earl of Warwick. Although it has been asserted that St John was educated at Eton College and Christ Church, Oxford, his name does not appear on registers for either institution and there is no evidence to support either claim. It is possible he was educated at a Dissenting academy.

He travelled to France, Switzerland and Italy during 1698 and 1699 and acquired an exceptional knowledge of French. St John made friends with the Whigs James Stanhope and Edward Hopkins and corresponded with the Tory Sir William Trumball, who advised him: "There appears indeed amongst us [in England] a strong disposition to liberty, but neither honesty nor virtue enough to support it".

Oliver Goldsmith reported that he had been seen to "run naked through the park in a state of intoxication". Jonathan Swift, his intimate friend, said that he wanted to be thought the Alcibiades or Petronius of his age, and to mix licentious orgies with the highest political responsibilities. In 1700, he married Frances, daughter of Sir Henry Winchcombe of Bucklebury, Berkshire, but this made little difference to his lifestyle.

== Early career ==
He became a Member of Parliament in 1701, representing the family borough of Wootton Bassett in Wiltshire, as a Tory. His seat was Lydiard Park at Lydiard Tregoze, now in the Borough of Swindon. He attached himself to Robert Harley (afterwards Lord Oxford), then Speaker of the House of Commons, and distinguished himself by his eloquence in debate, eclipsing his schoolfellow, Robert Walpole, and gaining an extraordinary ascendancy over the House of Commons. In May, he had charge of the bill for securing the Protestant succession; he took part in the impeachment of the Whig lords for their conduct concerning the Partition treaties, and opposed the oath of loyalty against the "Old Pretender". In March 1702, he was chosen commissioner for taking the public accounts.

After Queen Anne's accession, St John supported the bills in 1702 and 1704 against occasional conformity, and took a leading part in the disputes which arose between the two Houses. In 1704, St John took office with Harley as secretary at war, thus being brought into intimate relations with John Churchill, 1st Duke of Marlborough, by whom he was treated with favour. In 1708, he left office with Harley on the failure of the latter's intrigue, and retired to the country till 1710, when he became a privy counsellor and secretary of state in Harley's new ministry, representing Berkshire in parliament. He supported the bill for requiring a real property qualification for a seat in parliament. In 1711 he founded the Brothers' Club, a society of Tory politicians and men of letters, and the same year witnessed the failure of the two expeditions to the West Indies and to Canada promoted by him. In 1712, he was the author of the bill taxing newspapers.

The refusal of the Whigs to make peace with France in 1706, and again in 1709 when Louis XIV offered to yield every point for which the allies professed to be fighting, showed that the war was not being continued in the national interest, and the Queen, Parliament and the people supported the ministry in its wish to terminate hostilities. Because of the diversity of aims among the allies, St John was induced to enter into separate and secret negotiations with France for the security of British interests. In May 1712, he ordered James Butler, 2nd Duke of Ormonde, who had succeeded Marlborough in command, to refrain from any further engagement. These instructions were communicated to the French, though not to the allies, Louis putting Dunkirk as security into possession of England, and the British troops deserted their allies almost on the battlefield. Subsequently, St John received the congratulations of the French foreign minister, Jean-Baptiste Colbert, marquis de Torcy, on the French victory over Prince Eugene at Denain (24 July 1712).

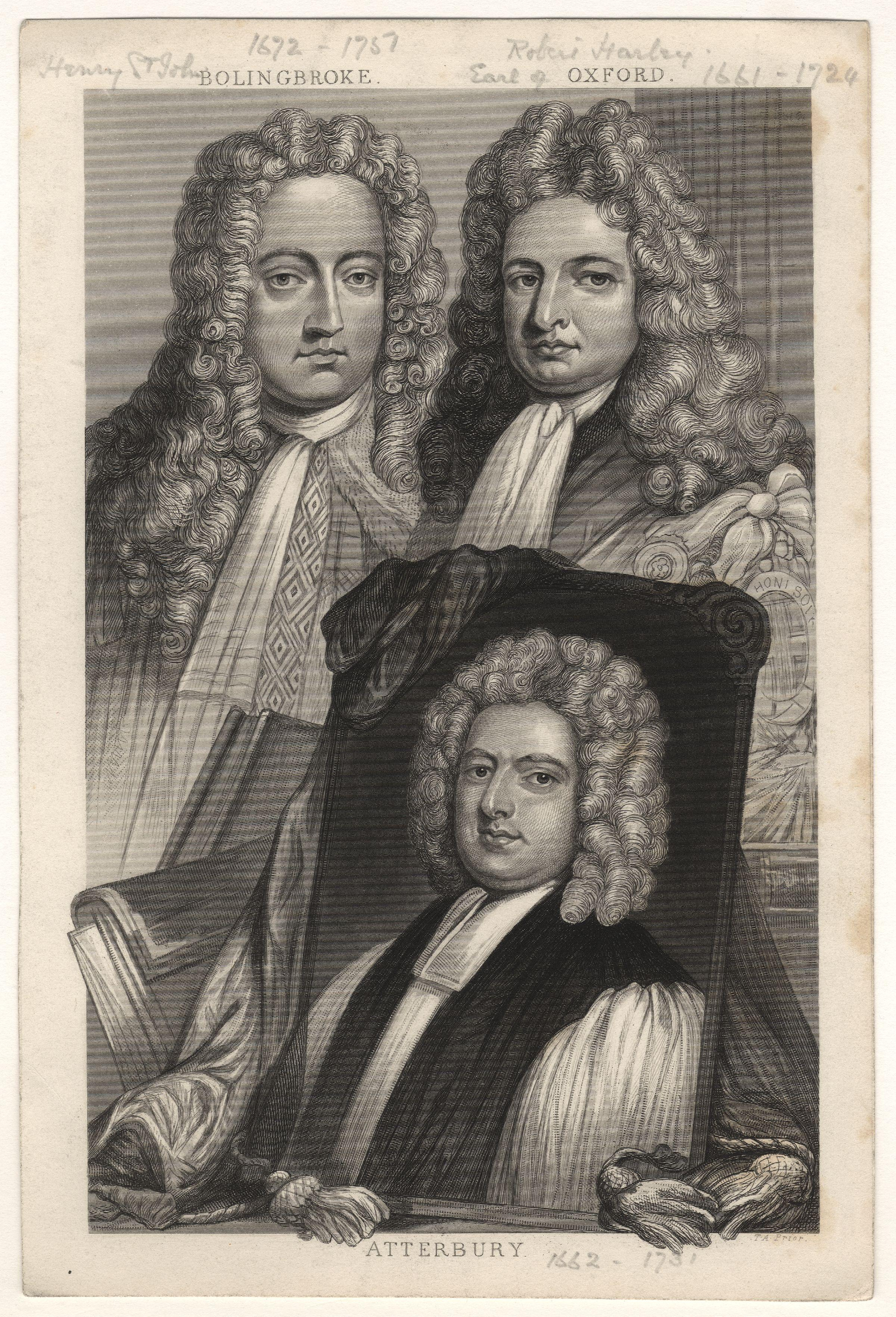
Bolingbroke pictured alongside the Earl of Oxford, together with a portrait of Francis Atterbury. Engraving after a painting by Sir Godfrey Kneller.

In June 1712, St John's commercial treaty with France, establishing free trade with that country, was rejected by the House of Commons. The treaty was presented in the Commons by Arthur Moore as St John had been created Viscount Bolingbroke earlier that year. A major campaign was waged against its approval under the slogan "No Peace Without Spain". At least 40 from the Tories voted to reject the treaty. In August 1712, Bolingbroke went to France and signed an armistice between Britain and France for four months. Finally, the Treaty of Utrecht was signed in March 1713 by all the allies except the Emperor. The first production of Joseph Addison's Cato, a Tragedy was made by the Whigs the occasion of a great demonstration of indignation against the peace, and by Bolingbroke for presenting the actor Barton Booth with a purse of fifty guineas for "defending the cause of liberty against a perpetual dictator".

Meanwhile, the friendship between Bolingbroke and Harley, the basis of the whole Tory administration, had been gradually dissolved. In March 1711, when Marquis Antoine de Guiscard made an attempt on Harley's life, Bolingbroke assumed temporary leadership of the ministry's affairs. His difficulty in controlling the Tory back-benchers, however, only made Harley's absence the more noticeable. In May, Harley obtained the earldom of Oxford and became Lord High Treasurer, while in July, St John was greatly disappointed at receiving only his viscountcy instead of the earldom lately extinct in his family, and at being passed over for the Order of the Garter.

In September 1713 Jonathan Swift came to London and made a final vain attempt to reconcile his two friends. But now a further cause of difference had arisen. The Queen's health was visibly breaking, and the Tory ministers anticipated their downfall on the accession of the Elector of Hanover. During Bolingbroke's diplomatic mission to France he had incurred blame for remaining at the opera while the Pretender was present, and according to the Mackintosh transcripts he had several secret interviews with him. Regular communications were kept up subsequently.

In March 1714, Charles-François d'Iberville, the French envoy in London, sent to de Torcy, the French foreign minister, the substance of two long conversations with Bolingbroke in which the latter advised patience till after the accession of George I, when a great reaction was to be expected in favour of the Pretender. At the same time, he spoke of the treachery of Marlborough and James FitzJames, 1st Duke of Berwick, and of one other (presumably Oxford) whom he refused to name, all of whom were in communication with Hanover. Both Oxford and Bolingbroke warned James Stuart that he could have little chance of success unless he changed his religion, but the latter's refusal does not appear to have stopped the communications.

Bolingbroke gradually superseded Oxford in the leadership. Abigail Masham, the Queen's favourite, quarrelled with Oxford and identified herself with Bolingbroke's interests. The harsh treatment of the Hanoverian demands was inspired by him, and won favour with the queen, while Oxford's influence declined; and by his support of the Schism Bill in May 1714, an aggressive Tory measure forbidding all education by dissenters by making an episcopal licence obligatory for schoolmasters, he probably intended to compel Oxford to give up the game. Finally, a charge of corruption brought by Oxford in July against Bolingbroke and Lady Masham, in connexion with the commercial treaty with Spain, failed, and the lord treasurer was dismissed or retired on 27 July 1714. The Queen died four days later, after appointing Charles Talbot, 1st Duke of Shrewsbury to the lord treasurership.

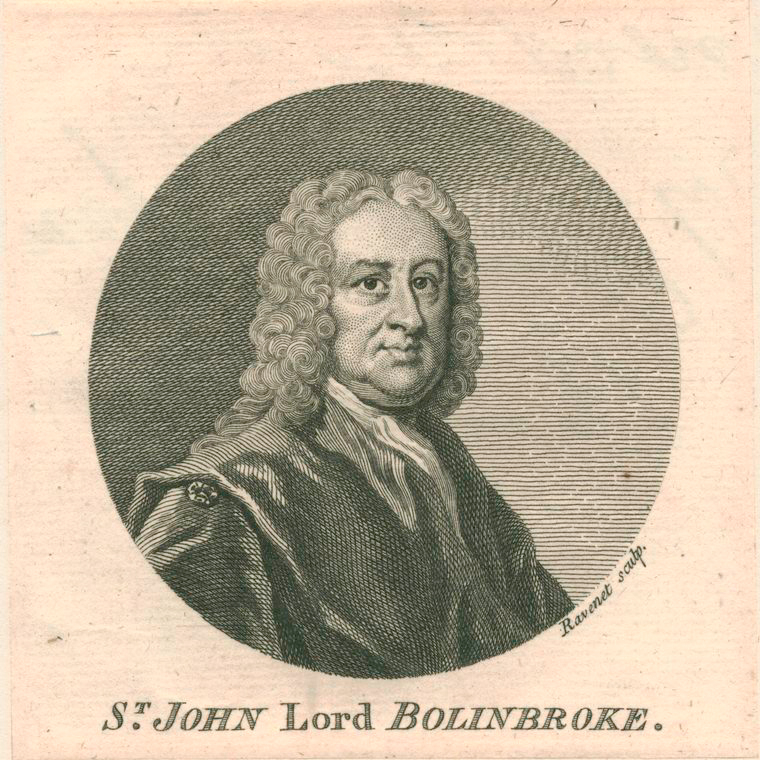
Henry St John, Viscount Bolingbroke

== Exile ==
On the accession of George I the illuminations and bonfire at Lord Bolingbroke's house in Golden Square were "particularly fine and remarkable", but he was immediately dismissed from office. The new king had been close to the Whigs but he was willing to bring in Tories. The Tories however refused to serve and gambled everything on an election, which they lost. The triumphant Whigs systematically removed the Tories from most of the posts nationally and regionally.

Bolingbroke followed an erratic course that baffled his contemporaries and historians. He retired to Bucklebury and is said to have now written the answer to the Secret History of the White Staff accusing him of being a Jacobite. In March 1715, he in vain attempted to defend the late ministry in the new parliament; and on the announcement of Robert Walpole's intended attack upon the authors of the Treaty of Utrecht he gave up.

Attainder of Viscount Bolingbroke Act 1714
- Act of Parliament
- Parliament of Great Britain
- Long title: An act for the attainder of Henry viscount Bolingbroke of high treason, unless he shall render himself to justice by a day certain therein mentioned.
- Citation: 1 Geo. 1. St. 2. c. 16
- Territorial extent: Great Britain

Dates
- Royal assent: 20 August 1715
- Commencement: 10 September 1715 (Note: Section 1.)
- Repealed: 16 June 1977
Other legislation
Repealed by	Statute Law (Repeals) Act 1977
Relates to	Attainder of Duke of Ormonde Act 1714; Henry St John Bolingbroke Restitution Act 1724

Status: Repealed

Text of statute as originally enacted

Bolingbroke fled in disguise to Paris—a major blunder. In an even greater blunder he joined the Pretender, was made Earl of Bolingbroke in the Jacobite Peerage, and took charge of foreign affairs in the Stuart court. The uprising of 1715 was badly botched and the death of Louis XIV meant the Pretender had lost his major sponsor; the French regent, Philippe II, Duke of Orléans, wanted peace with Britain and refused to endorse any further schemes. In March 1716, Bolingbroke switched sides again. He had lost his titles and property when Parliament voted a bill of attainder for treason, the Attainder of Viscount Bolingbroke Act 1714 (1 Geo. 1. St. 2. c. 16). He hoped to recover the good graces of King George, and indeed managed to do so in a few years.

He wrote his Reflexions upon Exile, and in 1717, his letter to Sir William Wyndham, 3rd Baronet in explanation of his position, generally considered one of his finest compositions, but not published till 1753 after his death. The same year, he formed a liaison with a widow Marie Claire Deschamps de Marcilly, whom he married in 1720, two years after his first wife's death. He bought and resided at the estate of La Source near Orléans, studied philosophy, criticised the chronology of the Bible, and was visited amongst others by Voltaire, who expressed unbounded admiration for his learning and politeness.

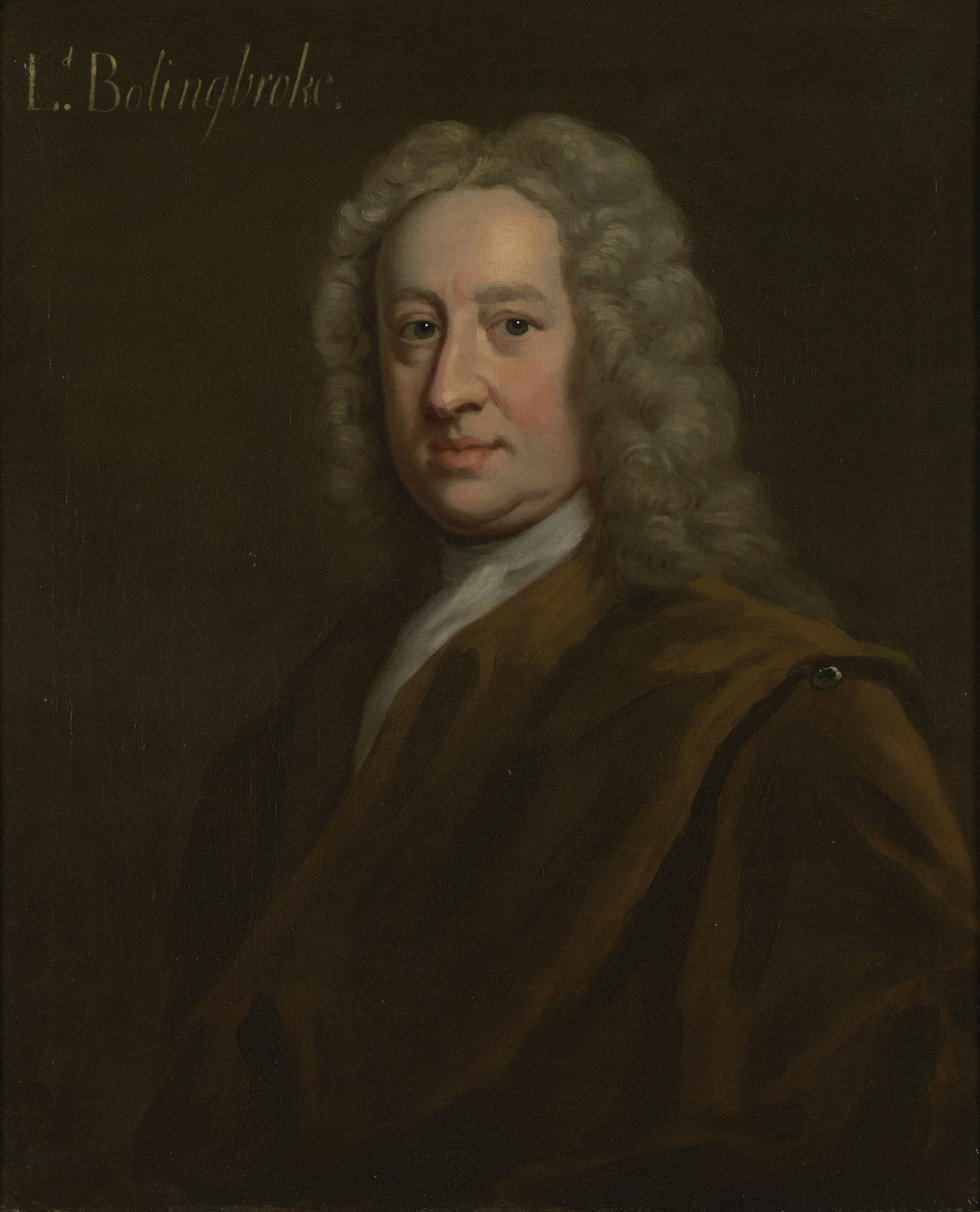
Henry St John, 1st Viscount Bolingbroke. Attributed to Charles Jervas.

== Pardon and return ==
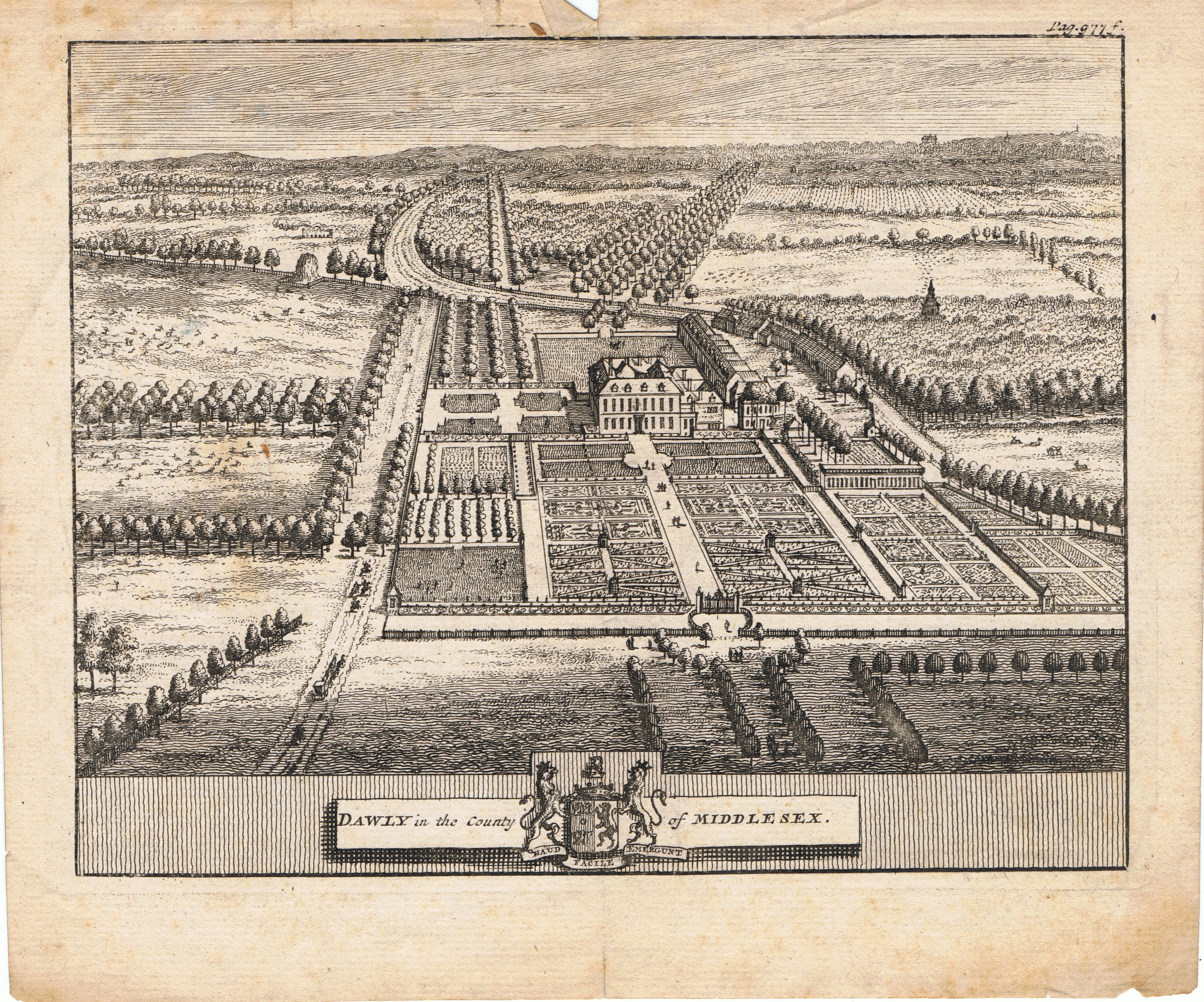
Engraving showing Dawley House, before Saint John's improvements.

Henry St John Bolingbroke Restitution Act 1724
- Act of Parliament
- Parliament of Great Britain
- Long title: An Act for enabling Henry St. John late Viscount Bolingbroke, and the Heirs Male of his Body, notwithstanding his Attainder, to take and enjoy several Manors, Lands, and Hereditaments, in the Counties of Wilts, Surrey, and Middlesex, according to such Estates and Interests as to him or them are limited thereof by the Quinquepartite Indenture and other Assurances therein mentioned; and for limiting the same, in Default of Issue Male of the Body of the said late Viscount Bolingbroke, to the other Sons of Henry Viscount St. John successively in Tail Male; and for other Purposes therein expressed.
- Citation: 11 Geo. 1. c. 40 Pr.
- Territorial extent: Great Britain

Dates
- Royal assent: 31 May 1725
- Commencement: 12 November 1724 (Note: Start of session.)
Other legislation
Relates to	Attainder of Viscount Bolingbroke Act 1714

Status: Current legislation

In 1723, through the medium of the King's mistress, Ehrengard Melusine von der Schulenburg, Duchess of Kendal and Munster, he received a pardon and returned to London. Walpole reluctantly accepted his return. In 1725, Parliament passed the Henry St John Bolingbroke Restitution Act 1724 (11 Geo. 1. c. 40 Pr.), which enabled him to hold real estate but without power of alienating it. But this had been effected in consequence of a peremptory order of the King, against Walpole's wishes, who succeeded in maintaining his exclusion from the House of Lords. He now bought an estate at Dawley, near Uxbridge, where he renewed his intimacy with Alexander Pope, Jonathan Swift and Voltaire, took part in Pope's literary squabbles, and wrote the philosophy for Pope's An Essay on Man (1734), which, at Epistle I, begins: "To Henry St. John, Lord Bolingbroke:

Awake, my St. John! leave all meaner things
To low ambition, and the pride of kings.
Let us (since life can little more supply
Than just to look about us and to die)
Expatiate free o'er all this scene of man;
A mighty maze! but not without a plan;

On the first occasion which offered itself, that of William Pulteney, 1st Earl of Bath's rupture with Walpole in 1726, he endeavoured to organise an opposition in conjunction with the former and Wyndham; and in 1727, began his celebrated series of letters to The Craftsman, attacking the Walpoles, signed "an Occasional Writer". He won over the Duchess of Kendal with a bribe of £11,000 from his wife's estates, and with Walpole's approval obtained an audience with the King. His success was imminent, and it was thought his appointment as chief minister was assured. In Walpole's own words, "as St John had the duchess entirely on his side I need not add what must or might in time have been the consequence", and he prepared for his dismissal. But once more Bolingbroke's "fortune turned rotten at the very moment it grew ripe", and his projects and hopes were ruined by the King's death in June.

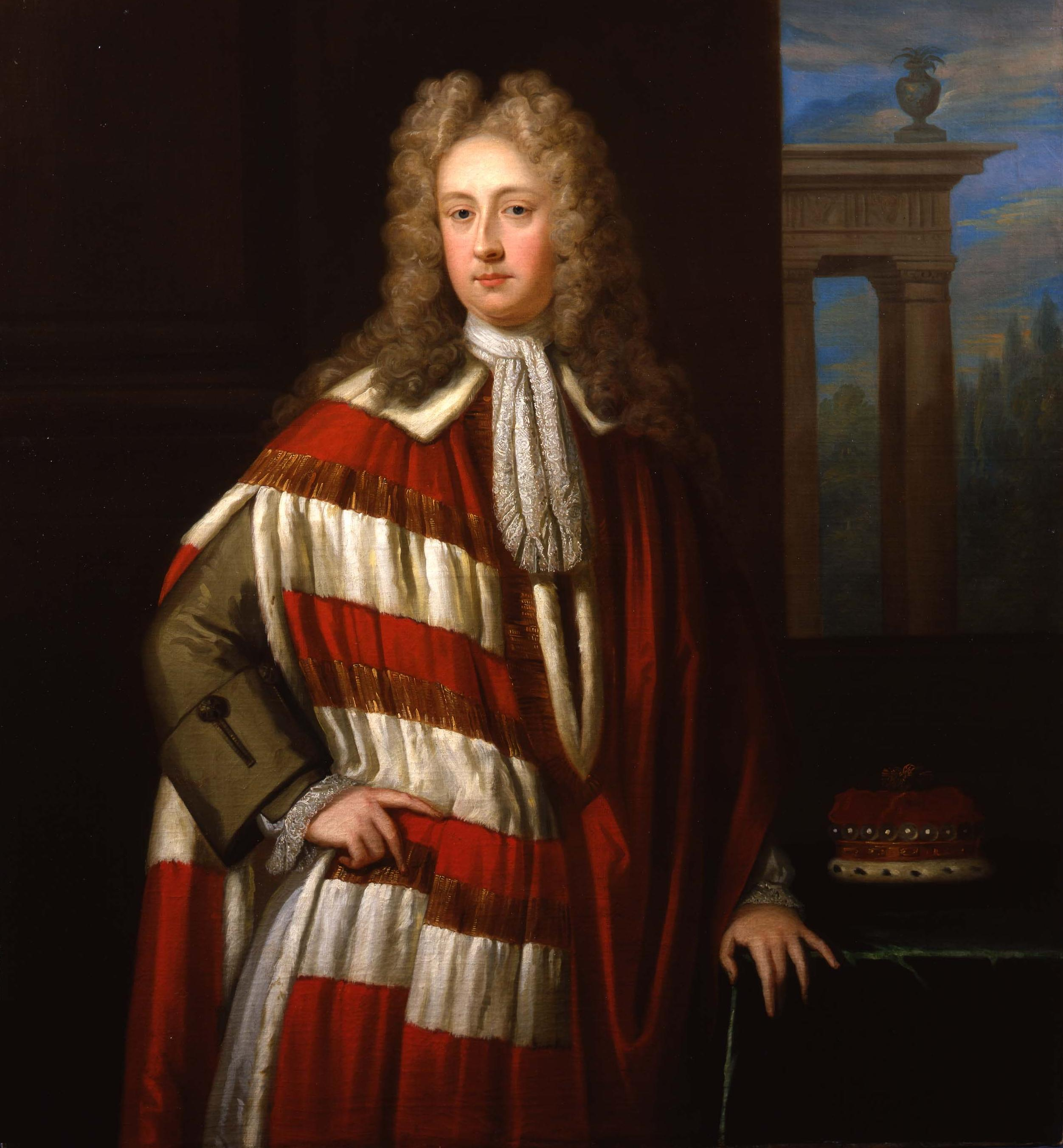
Henry St John retired in June 1735.

He wrote additional essays signed "John Trot" that appeared in the Craftsman in 1728, and in 1730 followed Remarks on the History of England by Humphrey Oldcastle, attacking Walpole's policy. Comment prompted by Bolingbroke was continued in the House of Commons by Wyndham, and great efforts were made to establish the alliance between the Tories and the Opposition Whigs. The Excise Bill in 1733 and the Septennial Bill in 1734 offered opportunities for further attacks on the government, which Bolingbroke supported by a new series of papers in the Craftsman styled "A Dissertation on Parties"; but the whole movement collapsed after the new elections, which returned Walpole to power in 1735 with a large majority.

Bolingbroke retired baffled and disappointed from the fray to France in June, residing principally at the Château d'Argeville near Fontainebleau. He now wrote his Letters on the Study of History (printed privately before his death and published in 1752), and the True Use of Retirement. In 1738, he visited England, became one of the leading friends and advisers of Frederick, Prince of Wales, who now headed the opposition, and wrote for the occasion The Patriot King, which together with a previous essay, The Spirit of Patriotism, and The State of Parties at the Accession of George I, were entrusted to Pope and not published. Having failed, however, to obtain any share in politics, he returned to France in 1739, and subsequently sold Dawley. In 1742 and 1743, he again visited England and quarrelled with Warburton. In 1744, he settled finally at Battersea with his friend Hugh Hume-Campbell, 3rd Earl of Marchmont, and was present at Pope's death in May. The discovery that the poet had printed secretly 1,500 copies of The Patriot King, caused him to publish a correct version in 1749, and stirred up a further altercation with Warburton, who defended his friend against Bolingbroke's bitter aspersions, the latter, whose conduct was generally reprehended, publishing a Familiar Epistle to the most Impudent Man Living.

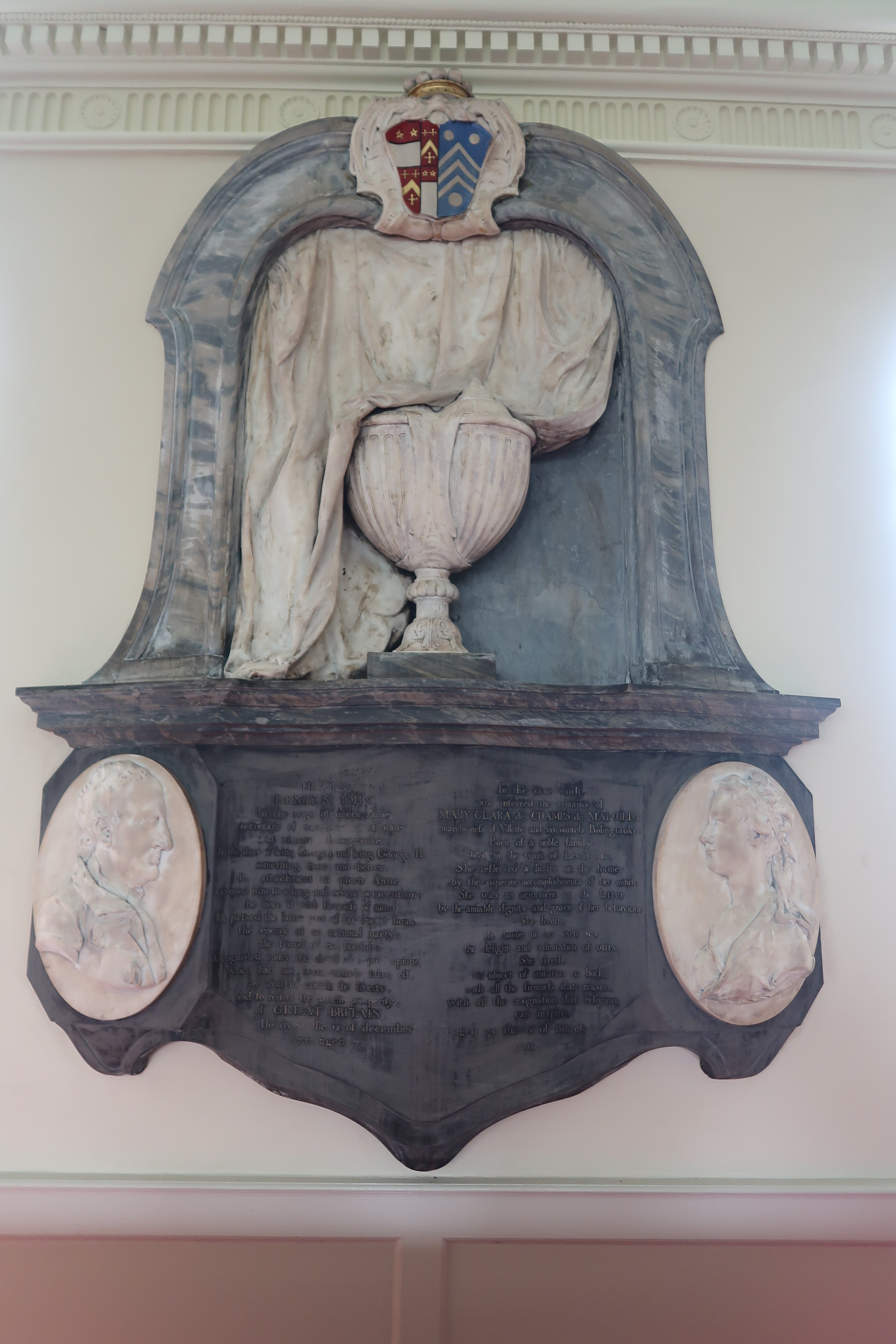
Henry St John, Viscount Bolingbroke and his second wife Mary Clara des Champs de Marcilly monument in St Mary's Church, Battersea - both epitaphs were written by Henry himself

== Death ==
In 1744, he had been very busy assisting in the negotiations for the establishment of the new "broad bottom" administration, and showed no sympathy for the Jacobite rising of 1745. He recommended the tutor for Prince George, afterwards George III. About 1749, he wrote the Present State of the Nation, an unfinished pamphlet. Philip Stanhope, 4th Earl of Chesterfield records the last words heard from him: "God who placed me here will do what He pleases with me hereafter and He knows best what to do". He died on 12 December 1751, aged 73, his second wife having predeceased him by one year. They were both buried in St Mary's, the parish church at Battersea, where a monument with medallions and inscriptions composed by Bolingbroke was erected to their memory. The monument was sculpted by Roubiliac.

He was succeeded in the title as 2nd Viscount Bolingbroke, according to the special remainder, by his half-nephew Frederick St John, 3rd Viscount St John (a title granted to Bolingbroke's father in 1716), from whom the title has descended. Frederick was the son of the 1st Viscount's half-brother John St John, by his father's second wife Angelica Magdalena Pelissary.

== Impact ==
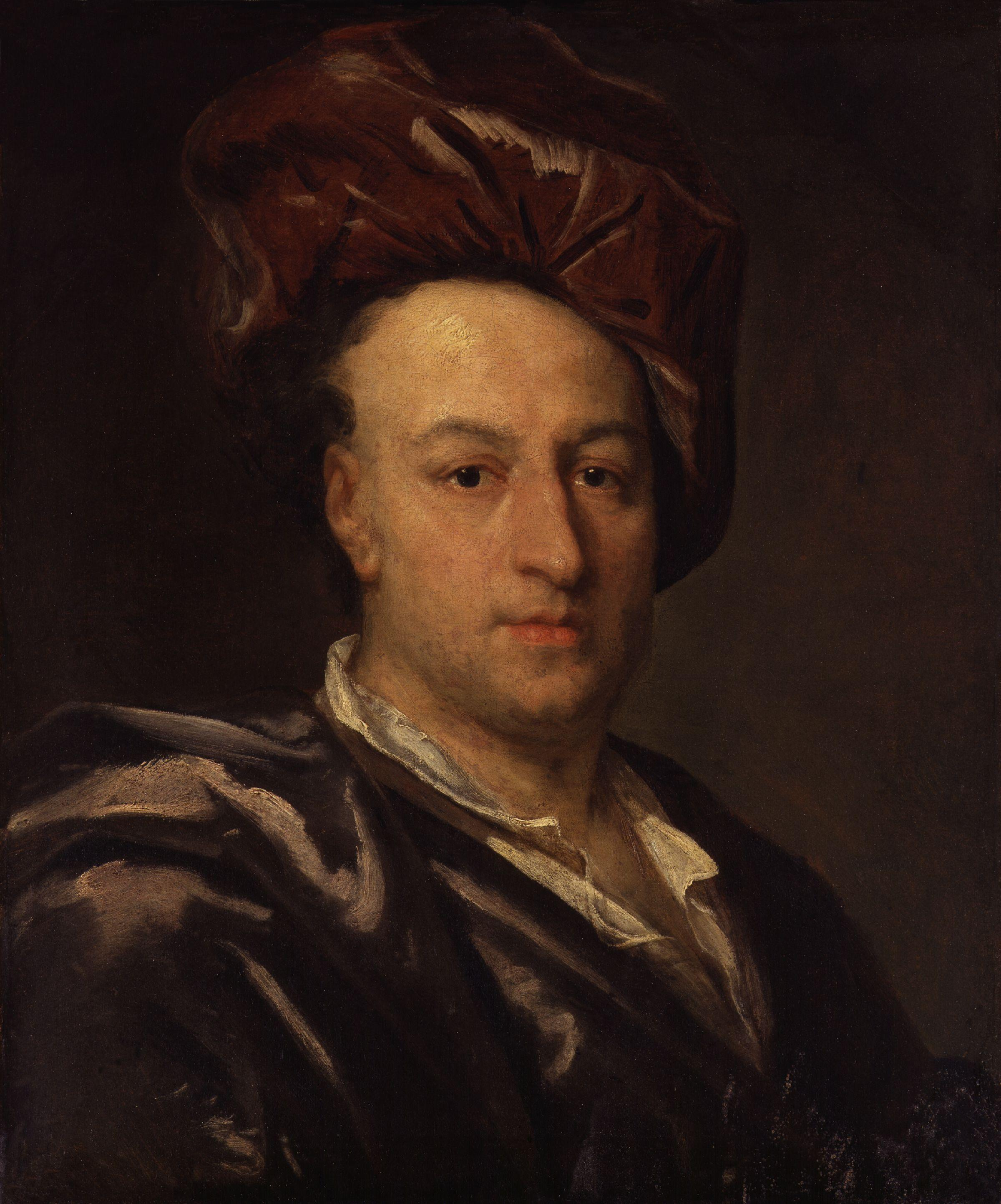
Portrait of Henry St John attributed to Jonathan Richardson

=== Influence in the United Kingdom ===
John Stuart, 3rd Earl of Bute and George III derived their political ideas from The Patriot King. Edmund Burke wrote his Vindication of Natural Society in imitation of Bolingbroke's style, but in refutation of his principles; and in the Reflections on the French Revolution he exclaims, "Who now reads Bolingbroke, who ever read him through?" Burke denied that Bolingbroke's words left "any permanent impression on his mind". Benjamin Disraeli lionised Bolingbroke as the "Founder of Modern Toryism", eradicating its "absurd and odious doctrines", and establishing its mission to subvert "Whig attempts to transform the English Constitution into an oligarchy".

The loss of Bolingbroke's great speeches was regretted by William Pitt more than that of the missing books of Livy and Tacitus. By the early 20th century, the writings and career of Bolingbroke would make a weaker impression than they made on contemporaries. He was thought by the author in his biography in A Short Biographical Dictionary of English (1910) to be a man of brilliant and versatile talents, but selfish, insincere and intriguing, defects of character which arguably led to his political ruin; and his writings were described as glittering, artificial and lacking philosophical merit. Philip Chesney Yorke, his biographer in the Encyclopædia Britannica Eleventh Edition, commented that his abilities were exercised upon ephemeral objects, and not inspired by lasting or universal ideas.

=== Enlightenment philosophy ===
Bolingbroke held certain views of opposition to church and theological teachings, which may have had influence during the Age of Enlightenment. The atheist antireligious French-German philosopher Baron d'Holbach quotes Bolingbroke in his political work Good Sense, in reference to Bolingbroke's statements against religion.

=== Republicanism in the United States ===
In the late 20th century, Bolingbroke was rediscovered by historians as a major influence on Voltaire, and on the American patriots John Adams, Thomas Jefferson and James Madison. Adams said that he had read all of Bolingbroke's works at least five times; Bolingbroke's works were widely read in the American colonies, where they helped provide the foundation for the emerging nation's devotion to republicanism. His vision of history as cycles of birth, growth, decline and death of a republic was influential in the colonies, as was his contention on liberty: that one is "free not from the law, but by the law". Bolingbroke, Georgia, was named after him.

== Country Party ==
Bolingbroke was especially influential in stating the need and outlining the machinery of a systematic parliamentary opposition. Such an opposition he called a "country party" which he opposed to the court party. Country parties had been formed before, for instance after the King's speech to Parliament in November 1685, but Bolingbroke was the first to state the need for a continual opposition to the government. To his mind the spirit of liberty was threatened by the court party's lust for power.

Liberty could only be safeguarded by an opposition party that used "constitutional methods and a legal course of opposition to the excesses of legal and ministerial power". He instructed the opposition party to "Wrest the power of government, if you can, out of the hands that employed it weakly and wickedly". This work could be done only by a homogeneous party "because such a party alone will submit to a drudgery of this kind". It was not enough to be eager to speak, keen to act. "They who affect to head an opposition ... must be equal, at least, to those whom they oppose". The opposition had to be of a permanent nature to make sure that it would be looked at as a part of daily politics. It had on every occasion to confront the government. He considered a party that systematically opposed the government to be more appealing than a party that did so occasionally. This opposition had to prepare itself to control government.

== Works ==
- Lashmore-Davies, Adrian C., ed. "The Correspondence of Henry St. John and Sir William Trumbull, 1698–1710", Eighteenth-Century Life 32, no. 3 (2008), pp. 23–179.
- Parke, G., ed. The Letters and Correspondence of Henry St John, Lord Viscount Bolingbroke. 4 vols. 1798.
- Dickinson, H. T., ed. "The Letters of Henry St. John to the Earl of Orrery, 1709–1711" Camden Miscellany, vol. XXVI. Camden Fourth Series. Volume 14 (London: The Royal Historical Society, 1975), pp. 137–199.
- H. T. Dickinson (ed.). "Letters of Bolingbroke to the Earl of Orrery, 1712–13", Camden Miscellany, Vol. XXXI. Camden Fourth Series. Volume 44 (London: The Royal Historical Society, 1992), pp. 349–371.
- The works of the late Right Honourable Henry St. John, Lord Viscount Bolingbroke, new ed., Vol. 1 (London, 1809).
- The works of the late Right Honourable Henry St. John, Lord Viscount Bolingbroke, new ed., Vol. 2 (London, 1809).
- The works of the late Right Honourable Henry St. John, Lord Viscount Bolingbroke, new ed., Vol. 3 (London, 1809).
- The works of the late Right Honourable Henry St. John, Lord Viscount Bolingbroke, new ed., Vol. 4 (London, 1809).
- The works of the late Right Honourable Henry St. John, Lord Viscount Bolingbroke, new ed., Vol. 5 (London, 1809).
- The works of the late Right Honourable Henry St. John, Lord Viscount Bolingbroke, new ed., Vol. 6 (London, 1809).
- The works of the late Right Honourable Henry St. John, Lord Viscount Bolingbroke, new ed., Vol. 7 (London, 1809).
- The works of the late Right Honourable Henry St. John, Lord Viscount Bolingbroke, new ed., Vol. 8 (London, 1809).
- The Works of Lord Bolingbroke, Vol 1. University Press of the Pacific, 2001. ISBN 0-89875-352-X
- Armitage, David, ed. Bolingbroke: Political Writings (Cambridge Texts in the History of Political Thought). Cambridge University Press, 1997. ISBN 0-521-58697-6
- The Philosophical Works of the Late Right Honourable Henry St John, Lord Viscount Bolingbroke, 3 vol. 1776, reprint 2005. ISBN 1-4212-0061-9
- Jackman, S. W., ed. The Idea of a Patriot King. Indianapolis, 1965.
- The Works of the Late Right Honorable Henry St. John, Lord Viscount Bolingbroke was first published in March 1754 in five quarto volumes, and it was made popular by its controversial outlooks on religion. A decade later, the highly successful London bookseller Andrew Millar was still selling the Works for a considerable fortune, setting the price at three guineas (three pounds and three shillings), a clear indication of the importance and value of the text. In a letter to Dr. Cadell in July 1765, Millar wrote "I never sold a Bolingbroke in quarto under 3 guineas ... Wren paid so and I can't now alter the price".

== Bibliography ==
=== Primary sources ===
- The works of Lord Bolingbroke, 4 vols. (1969)
- H. St John, Viscount Bolingbroke, The idea of a patriot king, ed. S. W. Jackman (Indianapolis, 1965)
- Lord Bolingbroke: historical writings, ed. I. Kramnick (Chicago, 1972)
- Lord Bolingbroke: contributions to The Craftsman, ed. S. Varey (1982)
- Bolingbroke: political writings, ed. D. Armitage (1997)
- Bolingbroke's political writings: the conservative Enlightenment, ed. B. Cottret (1997)

Parliament of England
Preceded by Henry Pinnell; Henry St John	Member of Parliament for Wootton Bassett; 1701–1707; With: Henry Pinnell 1701, 1702–1705; Thomas Jacob 1701–1702; John Morton Pleydell 1705–1706; Francis Popham 1706–1707	Succeeded by Parliament of Great Britain
Parliament of Great Britain
Preceded by Parliament of England	Member of Parliament for Wootton Bassett; 1707–1708; With: Francis Popham	Succeeded by Francis Popham; Robert Cecil
Preceded by Francis Popham; Robert Cecil	Member for Wootton Bassett; 1710; With: Richard Goddard	Succeeded by Richard Goddard; Edmund Pleydell
Preceded by Richard Neville; Sir John Stonhouse, Bt	Member of Parliament for Berkshire; 1710–1712; With: Sir John Stonhouse, Bt	Succeeded by Sir John Stonhouse, Bt; Robert Packer
Political offices
Preceded by George Clarke	Secretary at War; 1704–1708	Succeeded by Robert Walpole
Preceded by Henry Boyle	Secretary of State for the Northern Department; 1710–1713	Succeeded by William Bromley
Preceded by The Earl of Dartmouth	Secretary of State for the Southern Department; 1713–1714	Succeeded by James Stanhope
Preceded by Thomas Higgons	Jacobite Secretary of State; 1715–1716	Succeeded by John Erskine, Earl of Mar
Honorary titles
Preceded by The Earl Rivers	Lord Lieutenant of Essex; 1712–1714	Succeeded by The Earl of Suffolk
Preceded by The Earl of Dartmouth	Senior Privy Counsellor; 1750–1751	Succeeded by The Earl of Clarendon and Rochester
Peerage of Great Britain
New title	Viscount Bolingbroke; 1712–1751	Succeeded by Frederick St John
Peerage of England
New title	— TITULAR — Earl of Bolingbroke; Jacobite peerage 1715–1751	Extinct
