= George Alexander Stevens =

English actor and poet

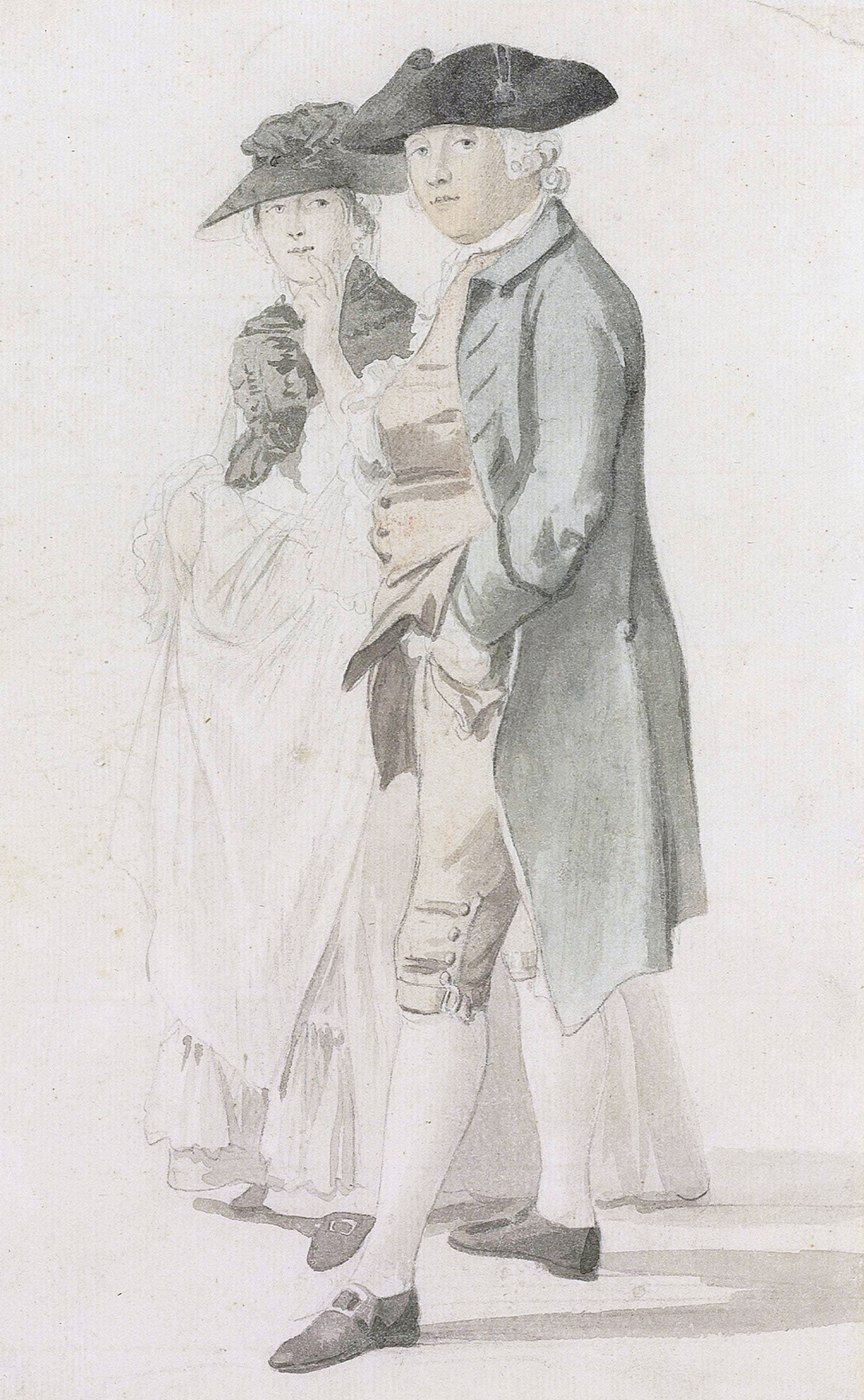
George Alexander Stevens and Mrs Paul Sandby (Paul Sandby)

George Alexander Stevens (1710 – 6 September 1780) was an English actor, playwright, poet, composer and songwriter. He was born in the parish of St. Andrews, in Holborn, a neighbourhood of London. After spending many years as a travelling actor, he performed for the theatre in Covent Garden (now the Royal Opera House).

Stevens was most famous in his lifetime for his Lecture on Heads, a satirical "lecture" on heads and fashion, which parodied the popularity of physiognomy. The lecture was first performed in 1764, and became an immediate success; he went on to perform it on tour throughout Great Britain, in Ireland, and in the American colonies at Boston and Philadelphia.

He was also known as popular songwriter, especially known for his bawdy drinking-songs and patriotic songs (such as Liberty-Hall and The Briton). Many of both kinds were collected in his Songs, comic and satyrical (1788).

Stevens also authored several dramatic pieces for the stage, a novel entitled Tom Fool, and a satire, The Birthday of Folly. He used the pen-name "A Lady", for part of The Female Inquisition.

He died in Baldock in Hertfordshire.

== Selective Bibliography ==
- George Alexander Stevens (1801), The Humourist’s Miscellany Crosby & Co. London; Revised extended edition 1804
