= John Tutchin =

John Tutchin (c.1660 or 1664 – 23 September 1707) was a radical Whig controversialist and gadfly English journalist (born in Lymington, Hampshire), whose The Observator and earlier political activism earned him multiple trips before the bar. He was of a Puritan background and held strongly anti-Catholic views.

== The Bloody Assizes ==
In 1685 he wrote Poems on several occasions. With a pastoral. To which is added, a discourse of life at the same time that he was beginning his agitation against the possible accession of James II of England. He joined in the Monmouth Rebellion that year and was tried by Judge Jeffreys during the Bloody Assizes. Jeffreys mocked Tutchin's verse from the bench and sentenced him to:

1. seven years in prison,
2. a fine of 100 marks,
3. a surety for a lifetime of good behaviour,
4. to be whipped through all of the market towns of Devonshire once a year.

Tutchin, facing this sentence, appealed to be hanged, instead. His punishment became a cause célèbre among the Whig and Tory partisans, with the result that he was released after a year. He then married Elizabeth Hickes, the daughter of a Puritan minister who had been vocal and active in the anti-Jacobite causes.

The arrival of William III of Orange pleased Tutchin, and he wrote An heroick poem upon the late expedition of His Majesty to rescue England from popery, tyranny, and arbitrary government in 1689. William was not, however, republican enough, and Tutchin's political philosophy was moving toward overt republicanism. However, Tutchin was rewarded for his Williamite support, and possibly for his role in the Monmouth Rebellion and Bloody Assizes, by being appointed a minor post in the victualling office.

Tutchin was convinced, throughout his life, that corruption was rampant and that people were trying to defraud the government or serve an anti-English master, and in 1699 he was rewarded with £12 for his officious "saving so much of the bloody pickle which drained from the casks and binns which hold the flesh at the Victualling Office." This was indicative, in a sense, of Tutchin's terrier-like concern. At the same time, he grew disaffected by William's Dutch courtiers and wrote, in 1700 The Foreigners. The poem outlined a Lockean position on the social contract and suggested that William was not a valid sovereign. Tutchin was arrested, but, because he had slightly disguised the proper names of the figures he lampooned, the poem could be pronounced a "seditious libel," but Tutchin could not be tried for sedition. Daniel Defoe answered Tutchin with The True-Born Englishman.

== The Observator ==
John Tutchin began The Observator in 1702, and it would continue past his death. The paper was shrill in its denunciations of Queen Anne and her Tory ministries. He and Defoe quarreled in their public writings, with Defoe representing a more Puritan stripe of the whig party and Tutchin the more democratic and Cromwellian side, and several authors would mention the two names together (including Alexander Pope, who has Defoe standing above a prostrate Tutchin in The Dunciad). The paper was written in dialogue form, where "Observator" or "Mr. Observator" and "Countryman" speak to one another.

In December 1703, The Observator was arraigned for scandalous libel on Parliament. In May 1704, Tutchin fled to France briefly to escape being seized. He contacted Robert Harley and sought his aid. Harley was a Tory, but he was also in contact with various Whig politicians and attempting to strike a middle line. (He was, for example, a friend to John Arbuthnot, who was an avowed enemy of Tutchin.) Tutchin was found guilty, but the conviction was overthrown on a technicality, as the evidence had been improperly presented. A number of Tory statesmen, MPs, and writers thought that the mistake in the proceedings had been intentional.

After he returned to England, Tutchin continued to rail at Jacobites and French agents everywhere. He accused the Navy of secretly supplying food for the French Navy. This got him arrested again. In October 1706 John Churchill, 1st Duke of Marlborough wrote in a letter to Harley, of the matter, "If I can't have justice done me, I must find some friend that will break his and the printer's bones." Whether he did so or not, something terrible did happen to Tutchin in prison. He was beaten severely and died of his injuries in custody on 23 September 1707.

While The Observator, in particular, was a noted venue for anti-Jacobite opinion, Tutchin's tendency toward paranoid-seeming fears and suspicions about the government had gotten him few contemporary friends. Even after his death under suspicious circumstances, he was not widely mourned, and Alexander Pope, in particular, memorialized him viciously in The Dunciad a full seventeen years after his death, where he has the publisher Edmund Curll given a gift of a tapestry by Dulness showing the fates of dunces, where the whipping of Tutchin through the west country is a featured panel.
