= 17th century in poetry =

== Works published ==
=== Denmark ===
- Thomas Kingo, Aandelige Siunge-Koor ("Spiritual Choirs"), hymns, some of which are still sung

=== Other ===
- Alaol, Padmavati, Bangladesh
- Martin Opitz, Das Buch der Deutschen Poeterey ("A Book of German Poetics"), Germany

== Births and deaths ==
=== Danish poets ===
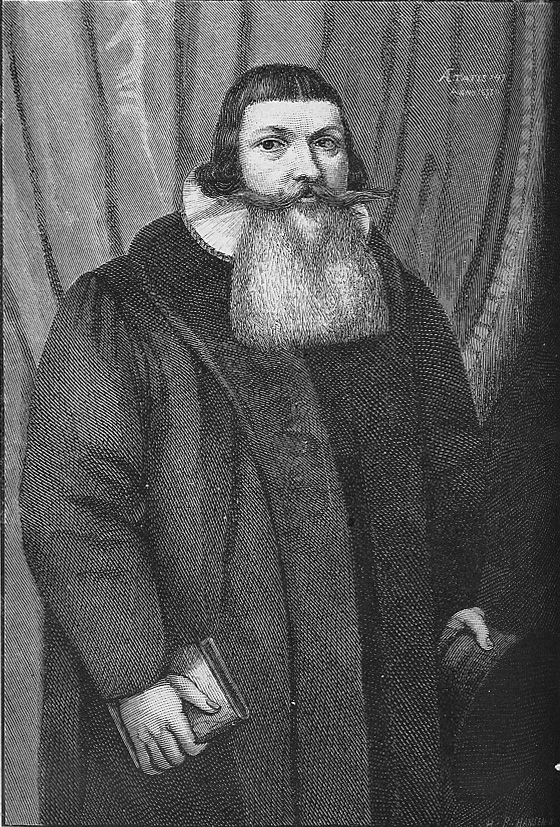
Anders Arrebo, 1886

- Anders Arrebo (1587–1637)
- Anders Bording (1619–1677)
- Thomas Kingo (1634–1703)
- Ludvig Holberg (1684–1754), Danish/Norwegian poet and playwright

=== German poets ===
- Barthold Heinrich Brockes (1680–1747)
- Paul Gerhart (1607–1676)
- Andreas Gryphius (1616–1664)
- Joachim Neander (1650–1680)
- Martin Opitz (1597–1639)

=== Norwegian poets ===
- Petter Dass (1647–1707)
- Dorothe Engelbretsdatter (1643–1716)
- Ludvig Holberg (1684–1754), Danish/Norwegian poet and playwright

=== Swedish poets ===
- Georg Stiernhielm (1598–1672)
- Samuel Columbus (1642–1679)
- Urban Hiarne (1641–1724)
- Lars Wivallius (1605–1669)
- Lars Johansson (1638–1674)
- Gunno Eurelius Dahlstierna (1661–1709)
- Samuel Triewald (1688–1743)
- Jacob Frese (1691–1729)
- Johan Runius (1679–1713)

=== Italian, Latin-language poets ===
- Gerolamo Aleandro (1574–1629), Italian, Latin-language poet

=== Japanese poets ===
- Kada no Azumamaro 荷田春満 (1669–1736), early Edo period poet, philologist and teacher as well as poetry tutor to one of the sons of Emperor Reigen; together with Keichū, co-founder of the kokugaku ("national studies") intellectual movement
- Kamo no Mabuchi 賀茂真淵 (1697–1769), Edo period poet and philologist
- Matsuo Bashō 松尾 芭蕉 (1644–1694), the most famous Edo period poet, recognized for his works in the collaborative haikai no renga form; now more recognized as a master of haiku
- Naito Joso (1662–1704), Genroku period haiku poet, a principal disciple of Bashō
- Nishiyama Sōin 西山宗因, born Nishiyama Toyoichi 西山豊一 (1605–1682), early Tokugawa period haikai-no-renga (comical renga) poet who founded the Danrin ("talkative forest") school of haikai poetry
- Nozawa Bonchō 野沢 凡兆 (c. 1640 – 1714), haikai poet
- Sonome 斯波 園女 (1664–1726), woman poet, friend and noted correspondent of Matsuo Bashō
- Takarai Kikaku 宝井其角, also known as "Enomoto Kikaku" (1661–1707), haiku poet and disciple of Matsuo Bashō

=== Persian-language poets ===
- Abul Ma'āni Abdul Qader Bedil also known as "Abdol-Qader Bidel Dehlavi" (1642–1720)
- Zeb-un-Nissa Makhfi (1637–1702)
- Sheikh Bahaii, Scientist, architect, philosopher, and poet (1546-1620)

=== South Asia ===
- Akho (1591–1659), poet, Vedantist and radical
- Rupa Bhavani (1621–1721), Indian, Kashmiri-language poet
- Arnos Paathiri, also known as "Johann Ernst Hanxleden" (1681–1732), a German Jesuit priest, missionary in India and a Malayalam/Sanskrit poet, grammarian, lexicographer, and philologist
- Premanand (poet) (1640–1700) nonreligious Indian poet who wrote originally in Hindi, but when reprimanded by his guru, switched to Gujarati, which he vowed to develop into a language of fine literary expression
- Wali Muhammad Wali, Wali Deccani (1667–1707), Urdu-language poet
- Mirza Mazhar Jan-e-Janaan (1699–1781), Urdu-language poet

== See also ==
- 17th century in literature
- Cavalier poets in England, who supported the monarch against the puritans in the English Civil War (1641–1651)
- Elizabethan literature (1557–1603)
- Poetry
- Restoration literature (1660–1689)

== Decades and years ==
1590s	1590	1591	1592	1593	1594	1595	1596	1597	1598	1599
1600s	1600	1601	1602	1603	1604	1605	1606	1607	1608	1609
1610s	1610	1611	1612	1613	1614	1615	1616	1617	1618	1619
1620s	1620	1621	1622	1623	1624	1625	1626	1627	1628	1629
1630s	1630	1631	1632	1633	1634	1635	1636	1637	1638	1639
1640s	1640	1641	1642	1643	1644	1645	1646	1647	1648	1649
1650s	1650	1651	1652	1653	1654	1655	1656	1657	1658	1659
1660s	1660	1661	1662	1663	1664	1665	1666	1667	1668	1669
1670s	1670	1671	1672	1673	1674	1675	1676	1677	1678	1679
1680s	1680	1681	1682	1683	1684	1685	1686	1687	1688	1689
1690s	1690	1691	1692	1693	1694	1695	1696	1697	1698	1699
1700s	1700	1701	1702	1703	1704	1705	1706	1707	1708	1709
