= 1656 in poetry =

List of years in poetry	(table)
- … 1646; 1647; 1648; 1649; 1650; 1651; 1652; 1653; 1654; 1655; 1656; 1657; 1658; 1659; 1660; 1661; 1662; 1663; 1664; 1665; 1666 …
- In literature 1653 1654 1655 1656 1657 1658 1659
- Art; Archaeology; Architecture; Literature; Music; Philosophy; Science; +...

Nationality words link to articles with information on the nation's poetry or literature (for instance, Irish or France).

== Events ==
- This year in England, John Phillips, a nephew of John Milton, is summoned before the privy council for his share in a book of licentious poems, Sportive Wit, suppressed by the authorities but almost immediately replaced by a similar collection, Wit and Drollery.
- Hallgrímur Pétursson begins work on his Passion Hymns

== Works published ==
- Margaret Cavendish, Lady Newcastle, Natures Pictures Drawn by Fancies Pencil to the Life, fiction, poetry and prose
- Abraham Cowley:
  - Miscellanies, including "On the Death of Mr. Crashaw"
  - Poems
  - Pindaric Odes
- Sir John Denham, translator, The Destruction of Troy, published anonymously, partial translation of Virgil's Aeneid, Book 2
- William Davenant, Wit and Drollery: Jovial Poems
- William Drummond, Poems
- John Evelyn, translator, An Essay on the First Book of T. Lucretius Carus, translation of the Latin of Lucretius' De rerum natura, with both English and Latin; including commendatory poems by Sir Richard Brown, Edmund Waller and Christopher Wase (in Latin); this work was the first attempt to translate the work into English; Evelyn translated only the first book after realizing that he didn't have the ability to write a translation, as he put it, "to equal the elegancy of the original", although some of his friends warned him of the danger of the atheistic work to his morals, spirituality and reputation
- Richard Flecknoe, The Diarium, or Journall, anonymously published
- Mary Oxlie, authored a commendatory poem of fifty-two lines, To William Drummond of Hawthornden

== Births ==
Death years link to the corresponding "[year] in poetry" article:

- Lady Mary Chudleigh (died 1710), English poet and essayist
- Henry Hall (died 1707), English poet and composer

== Deaths ==
Birth years link to the corresponding "[year] in poetry" article:

- Joseph Hall (born 1574), English bishop, satirist, moralist, and poet
- Johan van Heemskerk (born 1597), Dutch poet
- Johann Klaj (born 1616), German poet

== See also ==
- Poetry
- 17th century in poetry
- 17th century in literature
