= 1663 in poetry =

List of years in poetry	(table)
- … 1653; 1654; 1655; 1656; 1657; 1658; 1659; 1660; 1661; 1662; 1663; 1664; 1665; 1666; 1667; 1668; 1669; 1670; 1671; 1672; 1673 …
- In literature 1660 1661 1662 1663 1664 1665 1666
- Art; Archaeology; Architecture; Literature; Music; Philosophy; Science; +...

Nationality words link to articles with information on the nation's poetry or literature (for instance, Irish or France).

== Events ==
- February 24 – John Milton marries his third wife, Elizabeth Minshull, 31 years his junior, at St Mary Aldermary in the City of London.
- Robert Herrick begins publishing his Poor Robin's Almanack

== Works published ==
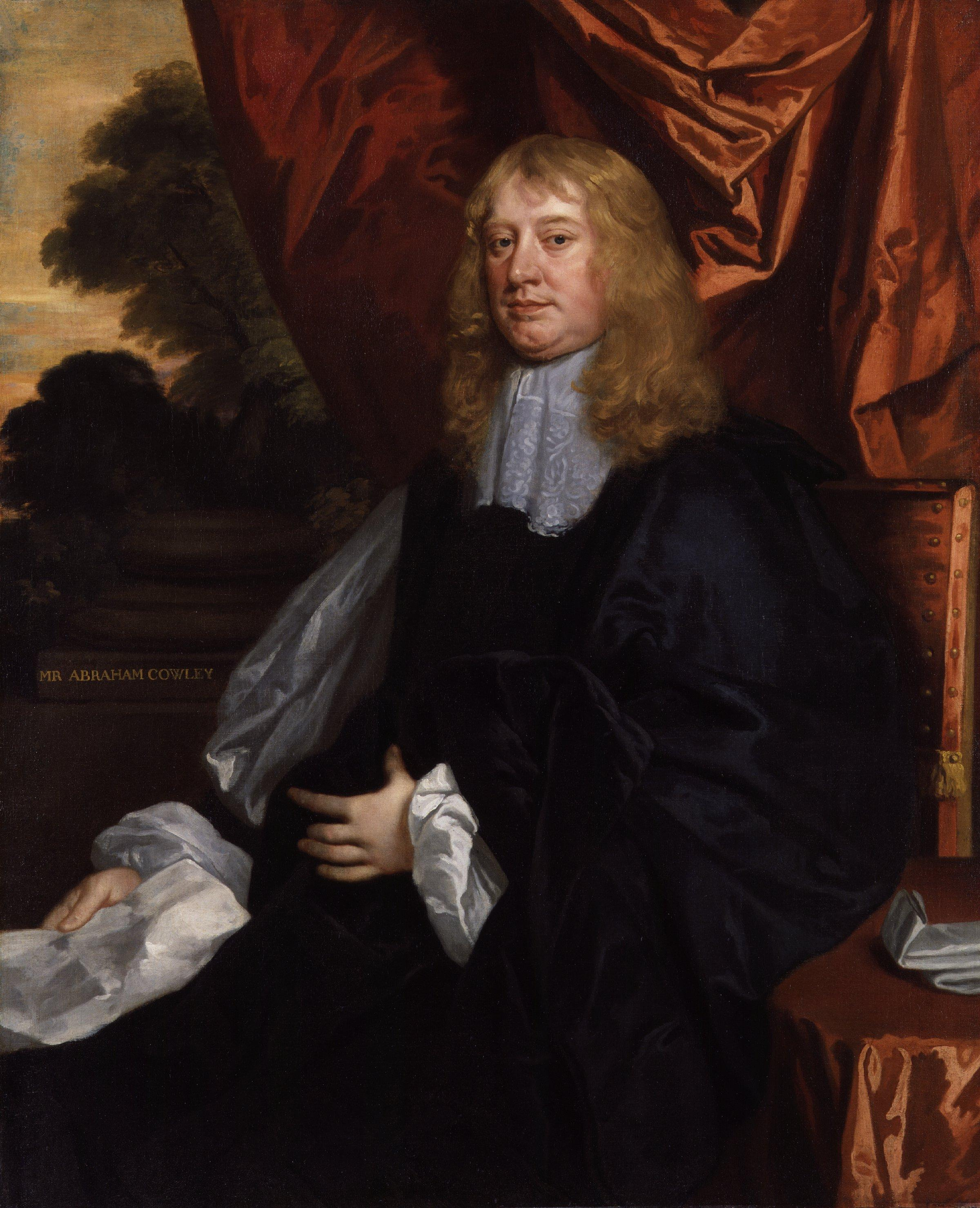
Abraham Cowley, portrait by Peter Lely, created about 1665-1666

- Samuel Butler, Hudibras. The First Part: Written in the time of the late wars, published anonymously (see also Hudibras, The Second Part 1664, Hudibras. The First and Second Parts 1674, Hudibras. The Third and Last Part 1678, Hudibras. In Three Parts 1684)
- Abraham Cowley, Verses, Lately Written Upon Several Occasions
- Sir William Davenant, Poem, to the King's Most Sacred Majesty
- John Dryden, To The Lady Castlemaine, Upon Her Incouraging His First Play, a poem
- Thomas Jordan, A Royal Arbor of Loyal Poesie
- Józef Bartłomiej Zimorowic, Sielanki nowe ruskie (New Ruthenian Pastorals)

== Births ==
Death years link to the corresponding "[year] in poetry" article:

- February 25 – Peter Anthony Motteux, born Pierre Antoine Motteux (died 1718), French-born English playwright, translator, editor, author and poet
- August 20 – Amalia Königsmarck (died 1740), Swedish noble and dilettante
- October 9 – Giovanni Mario Crescimbeni (died 1728), Italian critic and poet
- William King (died 1712), English writer
- George Stepney (died 1707), English diplomat and poet

== Deaths ==
Birth years link to the corresponding "[year] in poetry" article:

- Bihari Lal (born 1595), Hindi poet, wrote the Satasaī ("Seven Hundred Verses")
- Approximate date – Robert Sempill the younger (born c.1595), Scottish poet

== See also ==
- Poetry
- 17th century in poetry
- 17th century in literature
- Restoration literature
