= 1667 in poetry =

List of years in poetry	(table)
- … 1657; 1658; 1659; 1660; 1661; 1662; 1663; 1664; 1665; 1666; 1667; 1668; 1669; 1670; 1671; 1672; 1673; 1674; 1675; 1676; 1677 …
- In literature 1664 1665 1666 1667 1668 1669 1670
- Art; Archaeology; Architecture; Literature; Music; Philosophy; Science; +...

Nationality words link to articles with information on the nation's poetry or literature (for instance, Irish or France).

== Events ==
- April 27 – The blind, impoverished, 58-year-old John Milton seals a contract for publication of his epic poem Paradise Lost with London printer Samuel Simmons for an initial payment of £5. The first edition is published in October in 10 books and sells out in eighteen months (second edition, in 12 books, published 1674).

== Works published ==
- Nicholas Billingsley, Thesauro-Phulakion; or, A Treasury of Divine Raptures
- Charles Cotton, Scarronides; or, Virgile Travestie published anonymously (see also Scarronides 1665, 1665)
- Jeremias de Dekker (died 1666), Lof der Geldzucht ("In praise of avarice" - satire), Dutch
- Sir John Denham, On Mr Abraham Cowley His Death, and Burial Amongst the Ancient Poets
- John Dryden, Annus Mirabilis; The Year of Wonders, 1666
- John Milton, Paradise Lost
- Katherine Philips, Poems: By the most deservedly admired Mrs Katherine Philips the Matchless Orinda, published posthumously

== Births ==
Death years link to the corresponding "[year] in poetry" article:

- November 30 – Jonathan Swift (died 1745), Irish cleric, satirist, essayist, political pamphleteer, and poet
- John Pomfret (died 1702), English poet and clergyman
- Wali Mohammed Wali, also known as Wali Deccani and Wali Aurangabadi (died 1707), Indian, Urdu-language poet
- Ned Ward (died 1731), English satirical writer and publican

== Deaths ==
Birth years link to the corresponding "[year] in poetry" article:

- May 2 (O.S.) – George Wither (born 1588), English poet and satirist
- May 14 – Georges de Scudéry (born 1601), French novelist, dramatist and poet; elder brother of Madeleine de Scudéry
- July 12 (bur.) – Jan Vos (born 1612), Dutch playwright and poet
- July 28 – Abraham Cowley (born 1618), English poet
- August 31 – Johann von Rist (born 1607), German poet, hymnodist and dramatist

== See also ==
- Poetry
- 17th century in poetry
- 17th century in literature
- Restoration literature
