= 1668 in poetry =

| List of years in poetry | (table) |
- … 1658; 1659; 1660; 1661; 1662; 1663; 1664; 1665; 1666; 1667; 1668; 1669; 1670; 1671; 1672; 1673; 1674; 1675; 1676; 1677; 1678 …
- In literature 1665 1666 1667 1668 1669 1670 1671
- Art; Archaeology; Architecture; Literature; Music; Philosophy; Science; +...

Nationality words link to articles with information on the nation's poetry or literature (for instance, Irish or France).

== Events ==
- John Dryden becomes poet laureate of England on the death of Sir William Davenant. Dryden held the office until 1688 when, after James II of England was deposed, the poet refused to swear allegiance to the new monarchs and was replaced by Thomas Shadwell. Dryden was the only laureate not to die in office until Andrew Motion in 1999. Shadwell held the office until his death in 1692.)

== Works published ==
- Sir John Denham, Poems and Translations: With The Sophy, the first collected edition of Denham's poems
- John Dryden, Defence of an Essay of Dramatic Poesy, criticism
- Richard Flecknoe, Sir William D'Avenant's Voyage to the Other World: with his Adventures in the Poets Elizium: A poetical fiction, published anonymously
- Sir Robert Howard, The Duell of the Staggs
- Philip Pain, Daily Meditations, English Colonial American
- Georg Stiernhielm – Musæ Suethizantes

== Births ==
Death years link to the corresponding "[year] in poetry" article:

- January 5 (bapt.) – Alicia D'Anvers, born Alicia Clarke (died 1725), English
- February 19 – John Reynolds (died 1727), English Presbyterian minister and religious writer
- December 20 (bapt.) – Sarah Fyge Egerton (died 1723), English poet

== Deaths ==
Birth years link to the corresponding "[year] in poetry" article:

- February 2 – Antonio del Castillo y Saavedra (born 1616), Spanish Baroque painter, sculptor and poet
- February 23 – Owen Feltham (born 1602), English essayist and poet
- April 7 – Sir William Davenant (born 1606), English playwright and poet
- August 9 – Jakob Balde (born 1604), German scholar, poet and teacher
- Arnauld de Oihenart (born 1592), Basque historian and poet

== See also ==
- Poetry
- 17th century in poetry
- 17th century in literature
- Restoration literature
