= 1665 in poetry =

List of years in poetry	(table)
- … 1655; 1656; 1657; 1658; 1659; 1660; 1661; 1662; 1663; 1664; 1665; 1666; 1667; 1668; 1669; 1670; 1671; 1672; 1673; 1674; 1675 …
- In literature 1662 1663 1664 1665 1666 1667 1668
- Art; Archaeology; Architecture; Literature; Music; Philosophy; Science; +...

Nationality words link to articles with information on the nation's poetry or literature (for instance, Irish or France).

== Events ==
- Jacques Testu de Belval elected to the Académie française

== Works published ==
=== Great Britain ===
- Charles Cotton, Scarronides; or, Virgile Travestie, published anonymously (see also Scarronides 1664, 1667)
- Edward Herbert, Lord Herbert of Cherbury, Occasional Verses of Edward Lord Herbert, Baron of Cherbury and Castle-Island
- Andrew Marvell, The Character of Holland, published anonymously
- John Phillips, translator, Typhon; or, The Gyants War with the Gods: A mock poem, translated from Paul Scarron
- George Wither:
  - Meditations Upon the Lords Prayer
  - Three Private Meditations, poetry and prose

=== Other ===
- August Buchner (died 1661), Hauptwerk, Anleitung zur deutschen Poeterei ("Instructions for German poetry"), German poet and critic, published in Wittenberg
- Daniel Levi de Barrios, also known as Miguel de Barrios, Flor de Apolo, Jewish Spanish poet living in the Netherlands, published in Brussels
- René Rapin, Hortorum libri IV, Paris; Latin-language poem written in France (translated into English in 1673 and 1706)

== Births ==
Death years link to the corresponding "[year] in poetry" article:

- April 13 - Guillaume Massieu (died 1722), French churchman, translator and poet
- December 6 - Lady Grizel Baillie (died 1746), Scottish songwriter
- Ebenezer Cooke (also spelled "Cook"; died 1732), English Colonial American poet
- William Hamilton (died 1751), Scottish poet

== Deaths ==
Birth years link to the corresponding "[year] in poetry" article:

- March 7 - Guillaume Bautru (born 1588), French satirical poet and a founder member of the Académie française
- April 15 - Lorenzo Lippi (born 1606), Italian painter and poet
- November 17 - John Earle (born 1601), English bishop, writer and poet
- Samuel Coster (born 1579), Dutch playwright and poet

== See also ==
- Poetry
- 17th century in poetry
- 17th century in literature
- Restoration literature
