= 1666 in poetry =

List of years in poetry	(table)
- … 1656; 1657; 1658; 1659; 1660; 1661; 1662; 1663; 1664; 1665; 1666; 1667; 1668; 1669; 1670; 1671; 1672; 1673; 1674; 1675; 1676 …
- In literature 1663 1664 1665 1666 1667 1668 1669
- Art; Archaeology; Architecture; Literature; Music; Philosophy; Science; +...

Nationality words link to articles with information on the nation's poetry or literature (for instance, Irish or France).

== Events ==
- In Denmark, Anders Bording begins publishing Den Danske Meercurius ("The Danish Mercury"), a monthly newspaper in rhyme, using alexandrine verse, single-handedly published by the author from this year to 1677

== Works published ==
- George Alsop, A Character of the Province of Maryland, English Colonial American
- Edmund Waller, Instructions to a Painter (the first 64 lines had been published anonymously on a single sheet in 1665)
- George Wither, Sigh for he Pitchers

== Births ==
Death years link to the corresponding "[year] in poetry" article:

- November 12 – Mary Astell (died 1732), English feminist writer

== Deaths ==
Birth years link to the corresponding "[year] in poetry" article:

- February 12 – Mildmay Fane, 2nd Earl of Westmorland (born 1602), English nobleman, politician, and writer
- June 15 – Łukasz Opaliński (born 1612), Polish nobleman, poet, writer and political activist
- June 16 – Sir Richard Fanshawe (born 1608), English diplomat, translator and poet
- June 30 – Alexander Brome (born 1620), English
- October – James Shirley (born 1596), English poet and playwright
- November – Jeremias de Dekker (born 1610), Dutch
- November 3 (bur.) – James Howell (born 1594), English pamphleteer and poet
- Gysbert Japiks (born 1603), Frisian writer, poet, schoolteacher and cantor
- Jean Ogier de Gombauld (born 1576), French playwright and poet

== See also ==
- Poetry
- 17th century in poetry
- 17th century in literature
- Restoration literature
