= 1662 in poetry =

List of years in poetry	(table)
- … 1652; 1653; 1654; 1655; 1656; 1657; 1658; 1659; 1660; 1661; 1662; 1663; 1664; 1665; 1666; 1667; 1668; 1669; 1670; 1671; 1672 …
- In literature 1659 1660 1661 1662 1663 1664 1665
- Art; Archaeology; Architecture; Literature; Music; Philosophy; Science; +...

Nationality words link to articles with information on the nation's poetry or literature (for instance, Irish or France).

== Events ==
- John Dryden made a member of the Royal Society

== Works published ==
=== Great Britain ===
- Sir Aston Cockayne, Poems, second edition of Small Poems of Divers Sorts 1658
- John Dryden, To My Lord Chancellor, Presented on New-Years-Day
- Michael Wigglesworth, The Day of Doom or a Poetical Description of the Great and Last Judgment, a "doggerel epitome of Calvinistic theology", according to the anthology, Colonial Prose and Poetry (1903), that "attained immediately a phenomenal popularity. Eighteen hundred copies were sold within a year, and for the next century it held a secure place in [New England] Puritan households. As late as 1828 it was stated that many aged persons were still alive who could repeat it, as it had been taught them with their catechism; and the more widely one reads in the voluminous sermons of that generation, the more fair will its representation of prevailing theology in New England appear." English-born clergyman published in New England.

=== Other ===
- Jean de La Fontaine, Ode au roi ("Ode to the King"), which defends Nicolas Fouquet, France
- Michel de Marolles, Traité du poème épique, France
- Jacob Steendam, Praise of New Netherland, Dutch, Colonial American
- Joost van den Vondel, Joannes de Boetgezant ("John the Baptist"), epic, Dutch

== Births ==
Death years link to the corresponding "[year] in poetry" article:

- October 6 (bapt.) - William Walsh (died 1708), English poet and critic
- December 17 - Samuel Wesley (died 1735), English poet and religious leader
- Naitō Jōsō (died 1704), Japanese Genroku period haiku poet, a principal disciple of Bashō
- John Smith (died 1717), English poet and playwright

== Deaths ==
Birth years link to the corresponding "[year] in poetry" article:

- March 28 - Pierre de Boissat (born 1603), French soldier, writer, poet and translator
- March 30 - François le Métel de Boisrobert (born 1592), French

== See also ==
- Poetry
- List of years in poetry
- 17th century in poetry
- 17th century in literature
- Restoration literature
