= 1677 in poetry =

List of years in poetry	(table)
- … 1667; 1668; 1669; 1670; 1671; 1672; 1673; 1674; 1675; 1676; 1677; 1678; 1679; 1680; 1681; 1682; 1683; 1684; 1685; 1686; 1687 …
- In literature 1674 1675 1676 1677 1678 1679 1680
- Art; Archaeology; Architecture; Literature; Music; Philosophy; Science; +...

Nationality words link to articles with information on the nation's poetry or literature (for instance, Irish or France).

== Events ==
- In Denmark, Anders Bording ceases publication of Den Danske Meercurius ("The Danish Mercury"), a monthly newspaper in rhyme, using alexandrine verse, single-handedly published by the author; founded in 1666

== Works published ==
- John Cleveland, Clievelandi Vindiciae; or, Clieveland's Genuine Poems, Orations, Epistles, poetry and prose (see also J. Cleaveland Revived 1659)
- John Dryden, Apology for Heroic Poetry and Poetic License
- Urian Oakes, An Elegie Upon the Death of the Reverend Mr. Thomas Shepard, English Colonial America
- John Oldham, Upon the Marriage of the Prince of Orange with the Lady Mary, published anonymously, on the marriage of the future William III and Mary II in November of this year
- Nahum Tate, Poems (published in an expanded edition in 1684 as Poems Written on Several Occasions)

== Births ==
Death years link to the corresponding "[year] in poetry" article:

- Undated – Elizabeth, Lady Wardlaw (born 1727), English ballad writer

== Deaths ==
Birth years link to the corresponding "[year] in poetry" article:

- May 24 – Anders Bording (born 1619), Danish poet and journalist
- July 9 – Johannes Scheffler, also known as "Angelus Silesius" (born 1624), German mystic and poet
- October 29 – Charles Coypeau d'Assoucy (born 1604), French musician and burlesque poet
- December 24 – Jacques de Coras (born 1625), French poet and minister
- Undated – Saib Tabrizi (born 1601), Persian master of the form of classical Arabic and Persian lyric poetry known as ghazel

== See also ==
- Poetry
- 17th century in poetry
- 17th century in literature
- Restoration literature
