= 1679 in poetry =

List of years in poetry	(table)
- … 1669; 1670; 1671; 1672; 1673; 1674; 1675; 1676; 1677; 1678; 1679; 1680; 1681; 1682; 1683; 1684; 1685; 1686; 1687; 1688; 1689 …
- In literature 1676 1677 1678 1679 1680 1681 1682
- Art; Archaeology; Architecture; Literature; Music; Philosophy; Science; +...

Nationality words link to articles with information on the nation's poetry or literature (for instance, Irish or France).

== Events ==
- December 18 – Rose Alley ambuscade: English poet John Dryden is set upon by three assailants in London, thought to have been instigated by the Earl of Rochester in retaliation for an attack on "want of wit" in his poetry in The Essay on Satire (nominally by Dryden's patron, the poet John Sheffield, Earl of Musgrave, but probably with input from Dryden).

== Works published ==
- Abraham Cowley, A Poem on the late Civil War
- "Ephelia", a pen name, possibly Joan Philips, Female Poems on Several Occasions, published in an expanded edition in 1682 with new material — possibly all the new material — by other poets, including John Wilmot, earl of Rochester
- Benjamin Keach, Garnets Ghost
- John Oldham:
  - Garnets Ghost
  - A Satyr Against Vertue, published anonymously (reprinted in Satyres Upon the Jesuits 1681)
- John Phillips, Jockey's Downfall: A poem on the late total defeat given to the Scottish Covenanters
- John Wilmot, Earl of Rochester:
  - Artemisa to Cloe. A Letter from a Lady in the Town, to a Lady in the Country; Concerning The Loves of the Town By a Person of Quality, a broadside, London
  - A Letter from Artemiza in the Town, to Chloë in the Country, written anonymously "By a Person of Honour", a broadside, London
  - A Satyr Against Mankind, written anonymously "By a Person of Honour", a broadside, London
  - Upon Nothing. A Poem. By a Person of Honour, a broadside, London
  - A Very Heroical Epistle from My Lord All-Pride to Dol-Common, London

== Births ==
Death years link to the corresponding "[year] in poetry" article:

- January 4 – Roger Wolcott (died 1767), English Colonial American, governor of Connecticut and poet
- September 11 – Thomas Parnell (died 1718), Irish poet and clergyman, member of the Scriblerus Club
- Approximate date – Penelope Aubin (died 1731), English novelist and translator

== Deaths ==
Birth years link to the corresponding "[year] in poetry" article:

- February 5 – Joost van den Vondel (born 1587), Dutch writer considered the most prominent Dutch poet and playwright of the 17th century
- May 19 – Jacques Cassagne (born 1636), French clergyman, poet and moralist.
- July 30 (bur.) – Robert Wild (born 1609), English clergyman and poet
- November 4 – Lucy Hastings, Countess of Huntingdon (born 1613), English poet
- Also:
  - Nicolaes Borremans (born c.1614), Dutch Remonstrant preacher, poet and editor
  - Václav František Kocmánek (born 1607), Czech poet, author and historian

== See also ==
- Poetry
- 17th century in poetry
- 17th century in literature
- Restoration literature
