= 1719 in poetry =

List of years in poetry	(table)
- … 1709; 1710; 1711; 1712; 1713; 1714; 1715; 1716; 1717; 1718; 1719; 1720; 1721; 1722; 1723; 1724; 1725; 1726; 1727; 1728; 1729 …
- In literature 1716 1717 1718 1719 1720 1721 1722
- Art; Archaeology; Architecture; Literature; Music; Philosophy; Science; +...

Nationality words link to articles with information on the nation's poetry or literature (for instance, Irish or France).

== Events ==
- Nicholas Rowe's widow receives a pension from King George I of Great Britain in recognition of her husband's translation of Lucan's Pharsalia, published complete posthumously this year (dated 1718) with a life of Rowe by James Welwood.

== Works published ==
=== United Kingdom ===
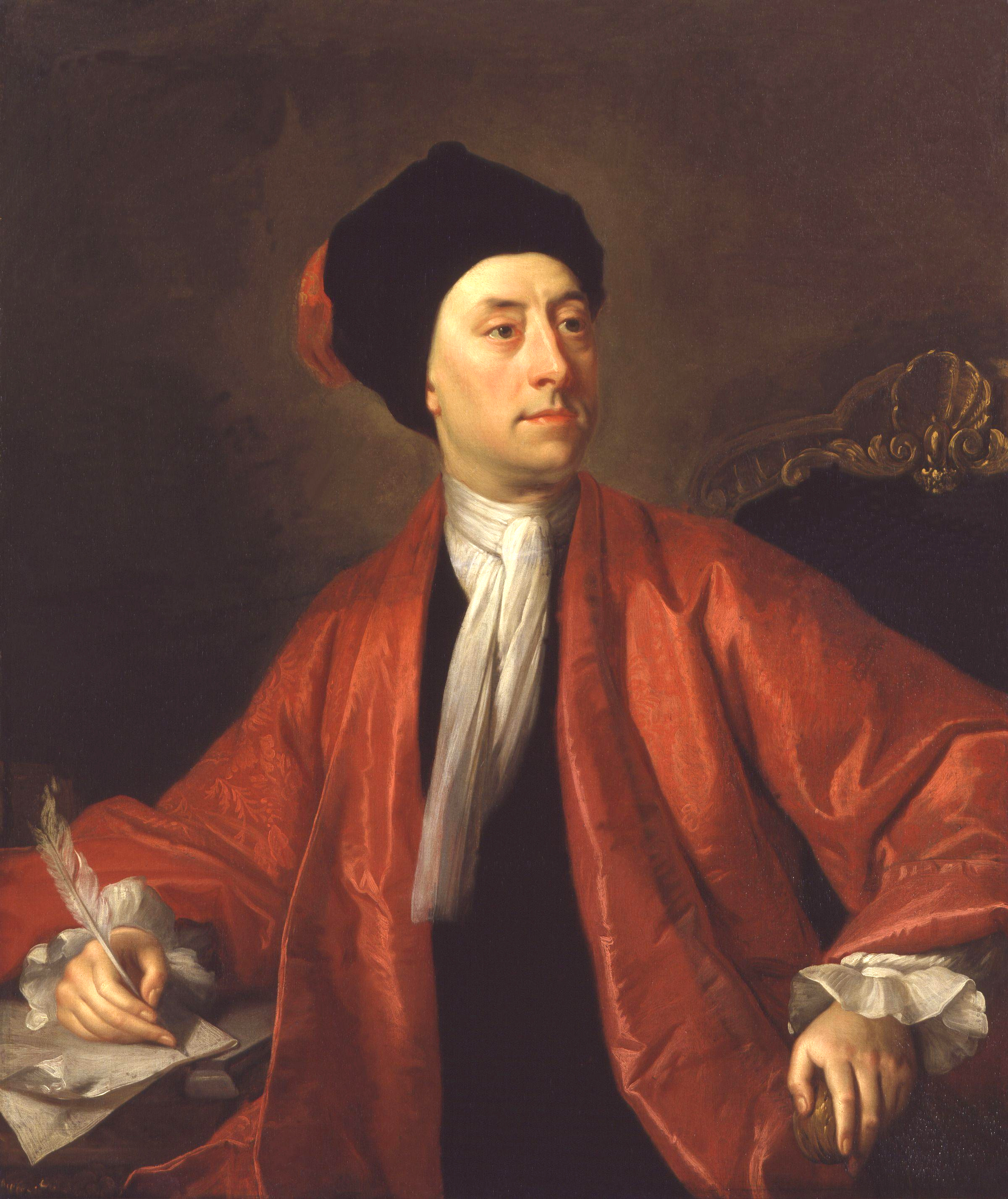
Matthew Prior, about 1718

- Joseph Addison:
  - The Old Whig. Numb. I, published anonymously on March 19
  - The Old Whig. Numb. II, published anonymously on April 2
- John Durant Breval:
  - Mac-Dermot; or, The Irish Fortune-Hunter
  - Ovid in Masquerade, published under the pen name "Mr. Joseph Gay" (although the pseudonym was also used by Francis Chute)
- Thomas D'Urfey, Songs Compleat, Pleasant and Divertive, in five volumes, the first two consisting of verse written by D'Urfey, a revised edition of Wit and Mirth, or Pills to Purge Melancholy, which had been published since 1598; after the book sold out this year, it went into a second edition under the original title (a sixth volume was added in 1720); although the pieces were meant to be sung, only the words were provided
- Giles Jacob, The Poetical Register; or, The Lives and Characters of the English Dramatick Poets, With an Account of their Writings, biography and criticism (a second volume, titled An Historical Account of the Lives and Writings of Our most Considerable English Poets, whether Epick, Lyrick, Elegaick, Eppigrammatists, Etc. was published in 1720; both volumes reissued in 1723
- Matthew Prior, Poems on Several Occasions, the book states "1718", but it was not ready for subscribers until March of this year (see also Poems on Several Occasions 1709)
- Allan Ramsay:
  - Content
  - Scots Songs (see also Scots Songs 1718)
- Nicholas Rowe, Lucan's Pharsalia, Translated into English Verse, dated "1718"
- George Sewell, Poems on Several Occasions
- Isaac Watts, Psalms of David
- Edward Young, A Letter to Mr. Tickell, on the death of Joseph Addison

=== Other ===
- Jean-Baptiste, abbé Du Bos, Réflexions critiques sur la poésie et la pienture, identifying the appeal of art, whether poetry or painting, as emotional rather than primarily intellectual enjoyment; criticism, France
- Ludvig Holberg, Pedar Paars, comic Danish heroic poem

== Births ==
Death years link to the corresponding "[year] in poetry" article:

- January 28 – Johann Elias Schlegel (died 1749), German critic and poet
- January 30 – Magnus Gottfried Lichtwer (died 1783), German poet
- April 2 – Johann Wilhelm Ludwig Gleim (died 1803), German poet
- September 27 – Abraham Gotthelf Kästner (died 1800), German poet
- November 4 – James Cawthorn (died 1761 in poetry), English poet and schoolmaster
- Probable date – James Eyre Weeks, English poet

== Deaths ==
Birth years link to the corresponding "[year] in poetry" article:

- January 18 – Samuel Garth (born 1661), English physician and poet
- May 29 – Joseph de Jouvancy (born 1643), French poet, pedagogue, philologist and historian
- June 17 – Joseph Addison (born 1672), English essayist, poet, writer and politician

== See also ==
- Poetry
- List of years in poetry
- List of years in literature
- 18th century in poetry
- 18th century in literature
- Augustan poetry
- Scriblerus Club

== Notes ==
- "A Timeline of English Poetry" Web page of the Representative Poetry Online Web site, University of Toronto
