= 1611 in poetry =

List of years in poetry	(table)
- … 1601; 1602; 1603; 1604; 1605; 1606; 1607; 1608; 1609; 1610; 1611; 1612; 1613; 1614; 1615; 1616; 1617; 1618; 1619; 1620; 1621 …
- In literature 1608 1609 1610 1611 1612 1613 1614
- Art; Archaeology; Architecture; Literature; Music; Philosophy; Science; +...

Nationality words link to articles with information on the nation's poetry or literature (for instance, Irish or France).

== Works ==
- Richard Brathwaite, The Golden Fleece
- William Byrd, Psalmes, Songs, and Sonnets; Some Solemne, Others Joyfull, verse and music
- George Chapman, The Iliads of Homer (see also Seven Bookes of the Iliades of Homere, Prince of Poets 1598 [contains books 1–2, 7–9], Achilles Shield 1598, Homer Prince of Poets 1609, Homers Odysses 1614, Twenty-four Bookes of Homers Odisses 1615, The Whole Workes of Homer 1616)
- John Donne, An Anatomy of the World: Wherein, by occasion of the untimely death of Mistris Elizabeth Drury the frailty and the decay of the whole world is represented, published anonymously; Elizabeth Drury was buried on December 17, 1610; written in hopes of securing the patronage of her father, Sir Robert Drury; in three parts: "To the Praise of the Dead and the Anatomy" (probably written by Joseph Hall, later bishop of Exeter and Norwich), "The Anatomy of the World", and "A funerall Elegie" (see also The First Anniversarie 1612)
- King James Bible, the Authorized Version based on the Bishops' Bible of 1568 and associated with the Hampton Court Conference of 1604; about 50 revisers worked in six groups, two at Oxford University, two at Cambridge University and two at Westminster
- Emilia Lanier, Salve Deus Rex Judaeorum
- Edmund Spenser, first folio edition of the author's collected works
- Pieter Corneliszoon Hooft, Emblemata amatoria: afbeeldingen van minne, Dutch

== Births ==
- September 1 – William Cartwright (died 1643), English dramatist, poet and churchman
- October 1 – Mathias Balen (died 1691), Dutch historian and poet
- October 26 – Antonio Coello (died 1652), Spanish dramatist and poet
- Also:
  - Jean François Sarrazin, birth year uncertain (died 1654), French satirist and poet
  - Sir Thomas Urquhart (also spelled "Thomas Urchard"; died c. 1660), Scottish writer, translator and poet

== Deaths ==
- June 8 – Jean Bertaut (born 1552), French
- March 11 – Giles Fletcher, the Elder (born c. 1549), English poet and ambassador; father of Giles Fletcher the younger
- Also:
  - Sun Kehong (born 1533), Chinese landscape painter, calligrapher, and poet
  - Siméon-Guillaume de La Roque (born 1551), French
