= 1615 in poetry =

List of years in poetry	(table)
- … 1605; 1606; 1607; 1608; 1609; 1610; 1611; 1612; 1613; 1614; 1615; 1616; 1617; 1618; 1619; 1620; 1621; 1622; 1623; 1624; 1625 …
- In literature 1612 1613 1614 1615 1616 1617 1618
- Art; Archaeology; Architecture; Literature; Music; Philosophy; Science; +...

Nationality words link to articles with information on the nation's poetry or literature (for instance, Irish or France).

== Events ==
- January 23 – English poet John Donne becomes an ordained minister in the Church of England.

== Works published ==
=== Great Britain ===
- John Andrewes, The Anatomie of Basenesse; or, The Foure Quarters of a Knave
- Richard Brathwaite, published under the name "Misosukos" to his friend "Philokrates", A Strappado for the Divell
- George Chapman, Twenty-four Bookes of Homers Odisses, publication year uncertain, Books 1–12 from Homers Odysses 1614 (see also Seaven Bookes of the Iliades of Homer 1598, Homer Prince of Poets 1609, The Iliads of Homer 1611, The Whole Workes of Homer 1616)
- Thomas Collins, The Teares of Love; or, Cupids Progresse
- Samuel Daniel, Hymens Triumph: A pastorall tragicomaedie
- Sir John Harrington, Epigrams Both Pleasant and Serious (see also The Most Elegant and Witty Epigrams 1618)
- Samuel Rowlands, Melancholie Knight
- Thomas Scot, Philomythie or Philomythologie: Wherein outlandish birds, beasts, and fishes, are taught to speake true English plainely, published this year although the book states "1616"; second part published 1616
- Joshua Sylvester, The Second Session of the Parliament of Vertues Reall, translations from Pierre Mathieu and Guillaume de Salluste du Bartas (see also The Parliament of Vertues Royal 1614)
- Robert Tofte, The Blazon of Jealousie, translated from Benedetto Varchi
- George Wither:
  - Fidelia, published anonymously
  - Shepherds Hunting

=== Other ===
- Théodore Agrippa d'Aubigné, Tragiques, set of poems on the persecution of the Huguenots

== Births ==
Death years link to the corresponding "[year] in poetry" article:

- June or July – Salvator Rosa (died 1673), Italian painter and poet
- John Denham (died 1669), English poet
- Germain Habert (died 1654), French churchman and poet
- Robert Wild (died 1679), English clergyman and poet

== Deaths ==
Birth years link to the corresponding "[year] in poetry" article:

- June 4 – Vavrinec Benedikt of Nedožery, also known as Laurentius Benedictus Nudozierinus (born 1555), Slovak
- September 1 – Étienne Pasquier (born 1529), French poet, humanist and historian
- date not known – Gabriel Lobo Lasso de la Vega (born 1555), Castilian Spanish poet, playwright and historian

== See also ==
- Poetry
- 16th century in poetry
- 16th century in literature
