= 1669 in poetry =

List of years in poetry	(table)
- … 1659; 1660; 1661; 1662; 1663; 1664; 1665; 1666; 1667; 1668; 1669; 1670; 1671; 1672; 1673; 1674; 1675; 1676; 1677; 1678; 1679 …
- In literature 1666 1667 1668 1669 1670 1671 1672
- Art; Archaeology; Architecture; Literature; Music; Philosophy; Science; +...

Nationality words link to articles with information on the nation's poetry or literature (for instance, Irish or France).

== Works published ==
=== Great Britain ===
- Sir John Denham, Cato Major of Old Age, a verse paraphrase of Cicero's De senectute
- Richard Flecknoe, Epigrams of All Sorts

=== Other ===
- René Rapin, Observations sur les poèmes d'Homère et de Virgile, critical essay, Paris; France

== Births ==
Death years link to the corresponding "[year] in poetry" article:

- February 3 – Kada no Azumamaro (died 1736), Japanese early Edo period poet and philologist

== Deaths ==
Birth years link to the corresponding "[year] in poetry" article:

- March 19 – John Denham (born 1614 or 1615), English poet and courtier, buried in Westminster Abbey
- September 3 – Esteban Manuel de Villegas (born 1589), Spanish
- September 30 – Henry King (born 1592), English poet and bishop
- October 8 – Jane Cavendish (born 1621), English poet and playwright

== See also ==
- Poetry
- 17th century in poetry
- 17th century in literature
- Restoration literature
