= 1672 in poetry =

| List of years in poetry | (table) |
- … 1662; 1663; 1664; 1665; 1666; 1667; 1668; 1669; 1670; 1671; 1672; 1673; 1674; 1675; 1676; 1677; 1678; 1679; 1680; 1681; 1682 …
- In literature 1669 1670 1671 1672 1673 1674 1675
- Art; Archaeology; Architecture; Literature; Music; Philosophy; Science; +...

Nationality words link to articles with information on the nation's poetry or literature (for instance, Irish or France).

== Events ==
- Le Mercure galant was founded in France by Donneau de Visé (who ran the paper until his death in 1710). The periodical initially contained only political news, but soon featured occasional verse, light fiction and gossipy letters.

== Works published ==
- Anonymous, Westminster Drollery, The Second Part, first part 1671
- A Collection of Poems, Written upon several Occasions, By Several Persons. Never before in Print, includes poems attributed to John Wilmot, Earl of Rochester, London: Hobart Kemp
- John Phillips, translation, Maronides or, Virgil Travestie

=== Other ===
- Daniel Levi de Barrios also known as Miguel de Barrios, Coro de las Musas, Jewish Spanish poet living in the Netherlands, published in Brussels
- Gian Francesco Bonamico, Mejju gie' bl'Uard, u Zahar, Malta, approximate date
- Nicolas Boileau-Despréaux, Fourth Epistle to the King of France
- René Rapin, Réflexions sur l'usage de l'éloquence de ce temps, critical essay, Paris; France

== Births ==
Death years link to the corresponding "[year] in poetry" article:

- January 18 – Antoine Houdar de la Motte (died 1732), 59, French poet and author
- May 1 – Joseph Addison (died 1719) was an English essayist and poet

== Deaths ==
Birth years link to the corresponding "[year] in poetry" article:

- April 22 – Georg Stiernhielm (born 1598), Swedish civil servant, linguist and poet#
- September 16 – Anne Bradstreet (born about 1612), called "the chief poetess of Colonial America"
- December 6 – Jasper Mayne (born 1604), English clergyman, translator, minor poet and dramatist
- Zhou Lianggong (born 1612), Chinese poet, essayist and art historian

== See also ==
- Poetry
- 17th century in poetry
- 17th century in literature
- Restoration literature
