= 1720 in poetry =

This article covers 1720 in poetry. Nationality words link to articles with information on the nation's poetry or literature (for instance, Irish or France).

== Works published ==
=== Great Britain ===
- Jane Brereton, An Expostulatory Epistle to Sir Richard Steele upon the Death of Mr. Addison, published anonymously
- Jonathan Burt, A Lamentation Occasion'd by the Great Sickness & Lamented Deaths of Divers Eminent Persons in Springfield, a jeremiad composed in hymnal meter, describing the benefits of living righteously and calling a recent deadly epidemic evidence of God's displeasure, English Colonial America
- Samuel Croxall, The Fair Circassian, verse adaptation of the Song of Songs
- John Gay, Poems on Several Occasions
- Anthony Hammond, A New Miscellany of Original Poems, Translations and Imitations, also known as Hammonds Miscellany, including work by Alexander Pope, Lady Mary Wortley Montagu, Bevil Higgons and Nicholas Amhurst, as well as letters by John Wilmot, the Earl of Rochester
- Aaron Hill, The Creation
- Giles Jacob, An Historical Account of the Lives and Writings of Our most Considerable English Poets, whether Epick, Lyrick, Elegaick, Eppigrammatists, Etc. (first volume, titled The Poetical Register; or, The Lives and Characters of the English Dramatick Poets, With an Account of their Writings published in 1719), biography and criticism; both volumes reissued in 1723
- Matthew Prior, Poems on Several Occasions, the book states "1718", but it was not ready for subscribers until March of this year (see also Poems on Several Occasions 1709)
- Alexander Pope, translator, Homer's Iliad Books V–VI, (preceded by Book I in 1715, Book II in 1716, Book III in 1717 and Book IV in 1718)
- Allan Ramsay, Poems
- George Sewell, A New Collection of Original Poems
- Edward Ward, The Delights of the Bottle; or, The Compleat Vintner

=== Other ===
- Ludvig Holberg, Peder Paars, a verse, mock-epic, Denmark

== Births ==
Death years link to the corresponding "[year] in poetry" article:

- January; Charlotta Löfgren (died 1784), Swedish poet
- October 3 – Johann Peter Uz, German poet (died 1796)
- December 14 – Justus Möser (died 1794), German jurist, social theorist and poet
- Francis Fawkes (died 1777), English poet and translator
- James Merrick (died 1769), English poet and scholar
- Jeanne-Catherine Van Goethem (died 1776) Flemish poet

== Deaths ==
Birth years link to the corresponding "[year] in poetry" article:

- January 1 – Francis Daniel Pastorius (born 1651), English Colonial American Quaker settler, founder of Germantown, Pennsylvania and poet
- June 27 – Guillaume Amfrye de Chaulieu (born 1639), French poet and wit
- August 5 – Anne Finch (born 1661), countess of Winchilsea, English poet
- date unknown
  - Abdul-Qādir Bēdil (born 1642), Persian poet and Sufi
  - Shalom Shabazi (born 1619), Jewish poet of Yemen

== See also ==
- Poetry
- List of years in poetry
- List of years in literature
- 18th century in poetry
- 18th century in literature
- Augustan poetry
- Scriblerus Club

== Notes ==
- "A Timeline of English Poetry" Web page of the Representative Poetry Online Web site, University of Toronto
