= Jacob Frese =

Swedish–Finnish poet (1690–1729)

Jacob Frese (1690 – 31 August 1729) was a Finnish and Swedish poet who wrote in Swedish. Having fled the Russian occupation of his hometown Vyborg, he found work as a civil servant in Stockholm and lived most of his life in poverty. He suffered from an illness of the lungs, which influenced his poetry. His poetry has been described as "extremely rich" and Baroque and often had a religious coloring. He imitated a variety of styles and wrote hymns which became quite popular within the pietist religious movement. Largely forgotten for the rest of the eighteenth century, he was valued by some Romantic authors and received greater recognition after 1900.

== Life and work ==
Jacob Frese was born in 1690 in Vyborg (then part of Sweden, now in Russia). He was the youngest son of Jochum Frese, a merchant of German origin, and Barbara Ruuth. When Jacob was a child, his father's once prosperous trading house went bankrupt. He studied at the Academy of Åbo in 1703. In 1711, after Vyborg was occupied by Russia during the Great Northern War, he fled to Stockholm. He entered the civil service and held a number of minor positions in the royal chancellery (Kanslikollegium) before entering the regular service in 1724. He lived as a poor bachelor and partly relied on the financial support of his merchant brothers. For less than a year in 1715–1716, he served as secretary to Baron Jacob Burensköld, governor of Skåne.

Frese had a good knowledge of poetry and was familiar with the works of Swedish poets such as Georg Stiernhielm, Sophia Elisabet Brenner, and Gunno Dahlstierna. He imitated a variety of styles, including religious epic poetry, patriotic poetry, occasional poems written for weddings and funerals, and contemplative poetry which was influenced by his illness (he suffered from a lung disease, probably pulmonary tuberculosis). For meter, he especially favored the French alexandrine and the end-rhymed hexameter used by Stiernhielm. According to Kari Tarkiainen, his "extremely rich" poetry is most characterized by its creative puns and its "Baroque exuberance."

Frese took interest in the religious movement known as pietism, which became popular in the 1710s. His hymns gained popularity among adherents of the movement, although they were never included in the contemporary hymnbook. Tarkiainen writes of Frese's psalm verses that "there is both longing for death and submission to the inevitable fate, but also warmth and humanity." According to Tarkiainen, his most beautiful poems are those with the recurring title "Vårbetraktelser" (Spring considerations); it was in spring that his illness became most severe. The epic series Passions-Tankar (Thoughts on the Passion), written in his last years, is regarded as his greatest work. In some of his poems, he plays on themes of apocalypse and "blood and thunder," but, in George C. Schoolfield's words, "the essential Frese is serene and wistful." He ends his final collection by contemplating on life: "what I've been in this world, / A dream, a stream, a shadow, and no more." The consolation of death is a recurring theme in Frese's work.

Frese emphasized his Vyborg and Finnish roots and experienced homesickness while in Stockholm. He refers to "Our Finland" in his earliest known occasional poem from the 1710s. He included a lengthy section about Vyborg, which had been occupied by the Russians after a long defense, in his poem "Echo å Sweriges Allmänne Frögde-Qwäden" (1715), written on the occasion of Charles XII's return from the Ottoman Empire. The section narrates a refugee's intense wish to see his hometown again. He also expresses in this poem hope for a peaceful future.

Frese died on 31 August 1729. His works were largely forgotten during the eighteenth century, although they were valued by some Romantic authors. He received greater recognition after 1900 thanks to the efforts of the Finnish literary historian Arvid Hultin.

== List of works ==
Frese wrote numerous occasional poems. Collections of his poetry are:

- Andelige och verldslige dikter (1724)
- Kårta sede-läror (1726)
- Passions-Tankar (1728)
- Ett urval samlade skrifter (Uppsala, 1876)
- Valda skrifter (1902)
