= 1697 in poetry =

Nationality words link to articles with information on the nation's poetry or literature (for instance, Irish or France).

== Works ==
- William Cleland (k. 1689), A Collection of several Poems and Verses composed upon various occasions, Scottish
- John Wilmot, 2nd Earl of Rochester (d. 1680), Familiar Letters: Written by the Right Honourable John late Earl of Rochester. And several other Persons of Honour and Quality, English, 2 volumes, London: Printed by W. Onley for Sam Briscoe

== Births ==
Death years link to the corresponding "[year] in poetry" article:

- April 24 – Kamo no Mabuchi 賀茂真淵 (died 1769), Japanese Edo period poet and philologist
- October 16 – Nicholas Amhurst (died 1742), English poet and political writer
- Mehetabel ("Hetty") Wesley (died 1750), English poet

== Deaths ==
Birth years link to the corresponding "[year] in poetry" article:

- October 1 – Moses ben Mordecai Zacuto (born 1625), kabalistic writer and poet
- December 9 – Scipion Abeille (year of birth unknown), French surgeon and poet
- Juan del Valle y Caviedes (born 1645), Spanish Peruvian poet and author
- Ebba Maria De la Gardie (born 1657), Swedish poet
- Mei Qing (born c.1623), Chinese landscape painter, calligrapher and poet

== See also ==
- List of years in poetry
- List of years in literature
- 17th century in poetry
- 17th century in literature
- Poetry
