= 1629 in poetry =

Nationality words link to articles with information on the nation's poetry or literature (for instance, Irish or France).

== Works published ==
- Sir John Beaumont, Bosworth-field: With a taste of the variety of other poems left by Sir John Beaumont, posthumously published by his son and namesake
- George Chapman, translator, A Justification of a Strange Action of Nero, Part 2 is a verse translation of Juvenal's Book 1, Satire 5
- Thomas Farnaby, editor, Florilegium Epigrammatum graecorum eorumque Latino versu a varus redditorum (later editions in 1650, 1671)
- Sir Francis Hubert, The Historie of Edward the Second Surnamed Carnarvan, the authorized edition; unauthorized edition published in 1628
- Thomas May, translation, Selected Epigrams of Martial
- Francis Quarles, Argalus and Parthenia

== Births ==
Death years link to the corresponding "[year] in poetry" article:

- Katherine Austen (died 1683), English diarist and poet
- Laurens Bake (died 1702), Dutch poet
- Zhu Yizun (died 1709), Chinese poet
- 12 December – Symeon of Polotsk (died 1680), Baroque Belarusian-Russian poet, dramatist, churchman, and enlightener

== Deaths ==
Birth years link to the corresponding "[year] in poetry" article:

- 18 August – Vendela Skytte (born 1608), Swedish noblewoman, salon hostess, writer and poet
- November – Robert Hayman (born 1575), English poet and governor of Newfoundland
- 5 May – Szymon Szymonowic (born 1558), Polish humanist, poet and playwright, called "the Polish Pindar"
- date not known – Gerolamo Aleandro (born 1574), Italian, Latin-language poet

== See also ==
- Poetry
- 17th century in poetry
- 17th century in literature
