= 1648 in poetry =

To the Virgins, to Make Much of Time

Gather ye rosebuds while ye may,

Old Time is still a-flying:

And this same flower that smiles to-day

To-morrow will be dying.

— First lines from Robert Herrick's To the Virgins, to Make Much of Time, first published this year

Nationality words link to articles with information on the nation's poetry or literature (for instance, Irish or France).

== Events ==
- June 9 – English Cavalier poet Richard Lovelace begins his second imprisonment for opposition to Parliament.

== Works published ==
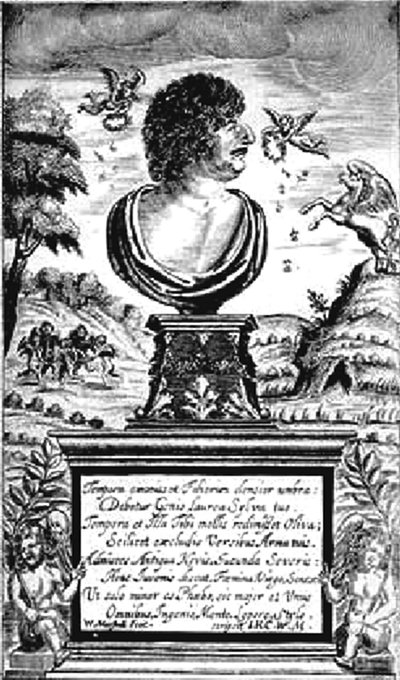
Title page of Robert Herrick's, Hesperides

=== Great Britain ===
- Joseph Beaumont, Psyche; or, Loves Mysterie, In XX Canto's
- Richard Corbet, Poetica Stromata; or, A Collection of Sundry Peices [sic] in Poetry, the second edition of Certain Elegant Poems 1647, (see also Poems 1672)
- William Davenant, London, King Charles his Augusta, or, City Royal, of the founders, the names, and oldest honours of that City
- Sir Richard Fanshawe, Il Pastor Fido the Faithfull Shepherd, entirely written by Fanshawe; intended as an addition to his translation of Giovanni Battista Guarini's Il Pastor Fido 1647
- Robert Herrick, Hesperides; or, The Works both Humane and Divine of Robert Herrick Esq., in two parts, secular and religious, the later with its own title page, with the title His Noble Numbers; or, His Pious Pieces; includes "To the Virgins, to Make Much of Time"; the book states it was published in 1647, but it was published this year
- George Wither, writing under the pen name "Terrae-Filius", Prosopopoeia Britannica

=== Other ===
- Alaol, Padmavati, Bangladesh
- Francisco de Quevedo, El Parnasso español, monte en dos cumbres, dividido con las nueve Musas castellanas ("The Spanish Parnassus, Mount with two peaks, shared by the nine Castilian Muses,"), edited by Antonio Jose Gonzalez de Salas; Spain
- Paul Scarron, Virgile travesti; France

== Births ==
Death years link to the corresponding "[year] in poetry" article:

- February 1 – Elkanah Settle (died 1724), English poet and playwright
- April 7 – John Sheffield, 1st Duke of Buckingham and Normanby (died 1721), English statesman and poet
- October 6 – Henrietta Catharina, Baroness von Gersdorff (died 1726), German noblewoman and poet
- November 12 – Juana Inés de la Cruz (died 1695), Mexican Hieronymite nun, polymath, poet and playwright

Also:

- Gaspard Abeille (died 1718), French lyric and tragic poet
- Petter Dass (died 1707), Norwegian poet
- Kong Shangren (died 1718), Qing Chinese playwright and poet

== Deaths ==
Birth years link to the corresponding "[year] in poetry" article:

- January 14 – Caspar Barlaeus, also known as Kaspar van Baerle (born 1584), Dutch humanist polymath, theologian, poet and historian
- c. February 20 – Tirso de Molina (born 1571), Spanish Baroque dramatist and poet
- April 7 – Robert Roberthin (born 1600), German poet
- May 26 – Vincent Voiture (born 1597), French poet and writer
- May 28 (bur.) – William Percy (born 1570/4), English poet and playwright
- August 20 – Edward Herbert (born 1583), Anglo-Welsh soldier, diplomat, historian, poet and religious philosopher
- November 17 (bur.) – Thomas Ford (born 1580), English composer, lutenist, viol player and poet
- Leon of Modena, also known as: (Judah) Leon(e) Modena or Yehudah Aryeh Mi-modena (born 1571), rabbi, orator, scholar, teacher and Hebrew-language poet
- Syed Sultan (born 1550), Bengali poet
- Cvijeta Zuzorić (born 1552), Ragusan lyric poet writing in Croatian, Italian and Latin

== See also ==
- Poetry
- 17th century in poetry
- 17th century in literature
- Cavalier poets in England, who supported the monarch against the puritans in the English Civil War
