= 1651 in poetry =

This article covers 1651 in poetry. Nationality words link to articles with information on the nation's poetry or literature (for instance, Irish or France).

== Works published ==
=== Great Britain ===
- Anonymous, A Hermeticall Banquet, published this year, although the book states "1652"; some attribute the book to James Howell, others to Thomas Vaughan
- William Bosworth, The shaft and Lost Lovers
- John Cleveland, Poems, this "sixth edition" has 28 poems, including 23 from the fifth edition of The Character of a London Diurnall 1647 and an additional prose work, "The Character of a Country Committee-Man, with the Ear-Mark of a Sequestrator"; many more editions followed
- Sir William Davenant, Gondibert: An heroick poem, also known simply as Gondibert, including Davenant's "Preface to his most honour’d friend Mr. Hobs" and "The Answer of Mr. Hobbes to Sir William D’Avenant’s Preface before Gondibert" by Thomas Hobbes, to whom the book is dedicated; also including commendatory verses by Edmund Waller and Abraham Cowley (first published in 1650 unfinished, then published again this year; the official second edition in 1653 includes verses by Davenant's friends; see also The Seventh and Last Canto' [...] of Gondibert 1685)
- 'A Scholler in Oxford', Newes from the Dead, or a True and Exact Narration of the Miraculous Deliverance of Anne Greene; whereunto are prefixed certain Poems casually written upon that subject, includes Latin verses by Christopher Wren
- Sir Edward Sherburne, Salmacis. Lyrian & Sylvia. Forsaken Lydia. The Rape of Helen., the book was also published in another edition this year, titled Poems and Translations, Amorous, Lusory, Morall, Divine
- Henry Vaughan, Olor Iscanus: A collection of some select poems, and translations, includes four prose translations
- Sir Henry Wotton, Reliquiae Wottonianae: Or, a collection of lives, letters, poems, poetry and prose, including "The Life of Sir Henry Wotton" by Izaak Walton; posthumously published

=== Other ===
- Isaac de Benserade, Job, a sonnet; France
- Miklós Zrínyi, The Siege of Sziget (Szigeti veszedelem); Hungary

== Births ==
Death years link to the corresponding "[year] in poetry" article:

- February 25 – Quirinus Kuhlmann (burned at the stake 1689), German Baroque poet and mystic
- September 26 – Francis Daniel Pastorius (died 1720), English Colonial American Quaker settler, founder of Germantown, Pennsylvania and poet
- November 12 – Juana Inés de la Cruz (died 1695), self-taught Novohispanic scholar, nun, poet and writer
- Mary Mollineux, née Southworth (died 1696), English Quaker poet

== Deaths ==
Birth years link to the corresponding "[year] in poetry" article:

- October 6 – Heinrich Albert (born 1604), German composer and poet
- December 6 – Anna Visscher (born 1584), Dutch artist, poet and translator
- Lady Mary Wroth (born 1586), English poet

== See also ==
- Poetry
- 17th century in poetry
- 17th century in literature
- Cavalier poets in England, who supported the monarch against the puritans in the English Civil War
