= 1685 in poetry =

This article covers 1685 in poetry. Nationality words link to articles with information on the nation's poetry or literature (for instance, Irish or France).

== Works published ==
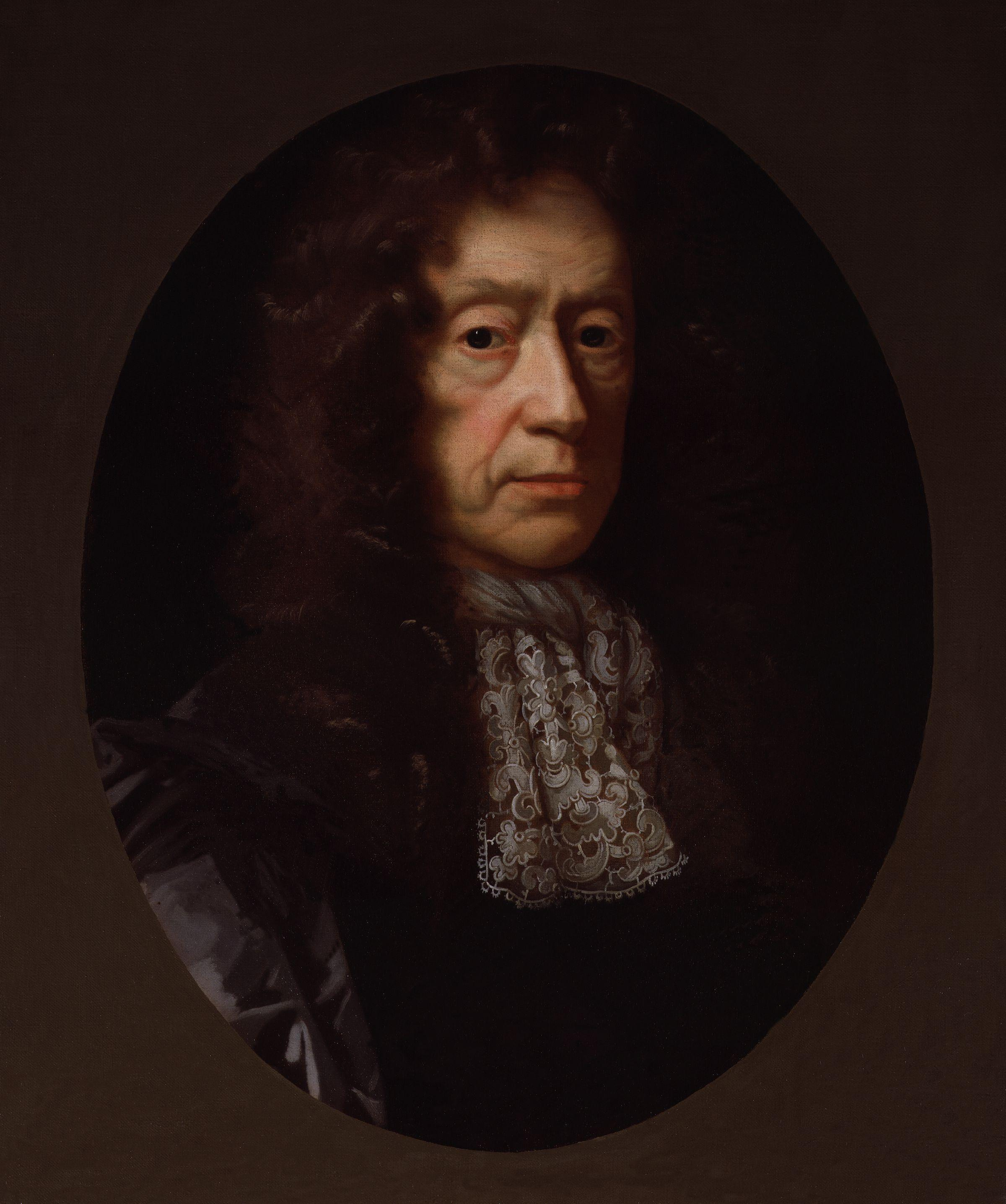
Portrait of Edmund Waller, by John Riley, circa 1685

=== Colonial America ===
- Cotton Mather, An Elegy [...] on Nathanael Collins, English Colonial America (Massachusetts)

=== Germany ===
- Emilie Juliane of Schwarzburg-Rudolstadt, German:
  - Kuhlwasser in grosser Hitze des Creutzes, hymns; published in Rudolstadt
  - Tägliches Morgen- Mittags- und Abendopfer, hymns; published in Rudolstadt

=== Great Britain ===
- Henry Bold, translator, Latine Songs, with their English: and Poems, includes "Chevy Chase", a ballad, and Sir John Suckling's poem "Why so pale and wan fond lover?"
- John Cutts, (later Baron Cutts), La Muse de Cavalier; or, An Apology for such gentleman as make poetry their diversion, not their business in a letter by a scholar of Mars to one of Apollo, published anonymously
- Sir William Davenant, The Seventh and Last Canto of the Third Book of Gondibert, published posthumously (see Gondibert 1651)
- John Dryden and Jacob Tonson, Sylvae; or, The Second Part of Poetical Miscellanies, the second in a series of miscellanies published by Tonson; has translations from Virgil, Lucretius, Theocritus and Horace, mostly by Dryden (see also Miscellany Poems 1684, Examen Poeticum 1693, Annual Miscellany 1694, Poetical Miscellanies: Fifth Part 1704, Sixth Part 1709)
- Nahum Tate, Poems by Several Hands, and on Several Occasions
- Edmund Waller, Divine Poems
- Samuel Wesley, Maggots; or, Poems on Several Subjects, Never Before Handled, published anonymously
- John Wilmot, Earl of Rochester, Poems on Several Occasions. Written by a late Person of Honour, London: Printed for A. Thorncome, posthumously published

==== English verses on the death of Charles II and coronation of James II ====
Charles II of England died on February 6; James II of England was crowned on April 23:

- Edmund Arwaker:
  - The Vision
  - The Second Part of The Vision, a Pindarick Ode, on the coronation of James II
- Aphra Behn:
  - A Pindarick on the Death of Our Late Sovereign
  - A Pindarick Poem on the Happy Coronation of His Most Sacred Majesty James II
- John Dryden, Threnodia Augustalis, on the death of Charles II
- Thomas Otway, Windsor Castle, on the death of Charles II; Otway died in April

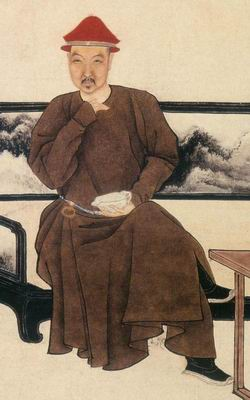
Portrait of Nalan Xingde, by Yu Zhiding, circa 1685

=== Gujarat ===
- Premanand Bhatt, Nalākhyān, Gujarati

=== Norway ===
- Dorothe Engelbretsdatter, Taare-Offer, Norwegian

== Births ==
Death years link to the corresponding "[year] in poetry" article:

- February 10 – Aaron Hill (died 1750), English dramatist, poet and miscellaneous writer
- June 30 – John Gay (died 1732), English poet and dramatist
- December 17 – Thomas Tickell (died 1740), English poet and man of letters
- Mary Barber (died 1755), English poet and member of Jonathan Swift's circle
- Jane Brereton (died 1740), English poet notable as a correspondent to The Gentleman's Magazine
- William Diaper (died 1717), English poet of the Augustan era
- William Harrison (died 1713), English poet and diplomat

== Deaths ==
Birth years link to the corresponding "[year] in poetry" article:

- January 18 – Wentworth Dillon, 4th Earl of Roscommon (born 1633), Anglo-Irish poet
- June 16 – Anne Killigrew (born 1660), English poet and painter
- July 1 – Nalan Xingde (born 1655), Chinese Qing dynasty poet most famous for his ci poetry
- October 12 – Gerard Brandt (born 1626), Dutch preacher, playwright, poet, church historian, biographer and naval historian
- Francesc Fontanella (born 1622), Catalan poet, dramatist and priest

== See also ==
- Poetry
- 17th century in poetry
- 17th century in literature
- Restoration literature
