= 1600 in poetry =

This article covers 1600 in poetry. Nationality words link to articles with information on the nation's poetry or literature (for instance, Irish or France).

== Works ==
=== Great Britain ===
- Robert Armin, Quips upon Questions; or, A Clownes Canceite on Occasion Offered (writing under the pen name "Clunnyco de Curtanio Snuffe")
- Nicholas Breton:
  - Melancholike Humours
  - Pasquils Mad-cap and his Message (published anonymously)
  - Pasquils Mistresse; or, The Worthie and Unworthie Woman (published under the pen name "Salochin Treboun")
  - Pasquils Passe, and Passeth Not
  - The Second Part of Pasquils Mad-cap intituled: The Fooles-cap
- Thomas Deloney (uncertain attribution), Patient Grissell, a ballad based on Book 10, novel X of Boccaccio's Decameron
- John Dowland, The Second Booke of Songs or Ayres (First Booke, 1597; Third and Last Booke, 1603)
- Edward Fairfax, translator (of Torquato Tasso's Gerusalemme Liberata), Godrey of Bulloigne; or, The Recoverie of Jerusalem
- Gervase Markham, The Teares of the Beloved; or, The Lamentation of Saint John, Concerning the Death and Passion of Christ Jesus our Saviour
- Christopher Marlowe's translation of Lucan's Pharsalia (posthumous)
- Christopher Middleton, The Legend of Humphrey Duke of Glocester
- Thomas Middleton, The Ghost of Lucrece, a sequel to Shakespeare's Lucrece
- Thomas Morley, The First Booke of Ayres; or, Little Short Songs to Sing and Play to the Lute
- John Norden, Vicissitudo Rerum: An elegaicall poeme, of the interchangeable courses and varietie of things in this world
- Samuel Rowlands:
  - The Letting of Humors Bood in the Head-vaine
  - A Merry Meeting, ordered burned and no copy is now extant (republished under the title The Knave of Cubbes in 1612)
- Thomas Weelkes' Canto
- John Weever, The Mirror of Martyrs; or, The Life and Death of that Thrice Valiant Captaine, and Most Godly Martyre, Sir John Old-castle Knight Lord Cobham

==== Anthologies in Great Britain ====
- Robert Allott (initialed "R. A.", generally attributed to Allott), editor, Englands Parnassus; or, The Choysest Flowers of our Moderne Poets, with their Poeticall Comparisons
- John Bodenham (published anonymously, usually attributed to him, sometimes to Anthony Munday), editor, Bel-vedere; or, The Garden of the Muses, anthology
- John Flasket, Englands Helicon, English anthology with poems by Edmund Spenser, Michael Drayton, Thomas Lodge, Philip Sidney and others

=== Other ===
- Siddha Basavaraja, Bedagina Vachanagalu, anthology, India
- François de Malherbe, Ode à la reine sur sa bienvenue en France, recited at the reception given to Marie de Médicis in Aix; the poem attracted the attention of Henry IV of France, to whose court Malherbe is attached in 1605, France
- Romancero general, anthology, Spain

== Births ==
Death years link to the corresponding "[year] in poetry" article:

- January 17 – Pedro Calderón de la Barca (died 1681), Spanish writer, poet and dramatist
- November – John Ogilby (died 1676), Scottish translator, impresario and cartographer
- Also:
  - Marin le Roy de Gomberville (died 1674), French poet and novelist
  - Piaras Feiritéar (hanged 1653), Irish
  - Richard Flecknoe (died 1678), English dramatist and poet
  - Petru Fudduni (died 1670), Italian poet writing predominantly in Sicilian
  - Johannes Plavius (died unknown), German poet
  - Daulat Qazi (died 1638), medieval Bengali poet

== Deaths ==
Birth years link to the corresponding "[year] in poetry" article:

- April – Thomas Deloney (born 1543), English novelist and balladist
- Also:
  - Elazar ben Moshe Azikri (born 1533), Jewish kabbalist, poet and writer
  - Bâkî باقى pen name Turkish poet Mahmud Abdülbâkî, known as Sultânüş-şuarâ سلطان الشعرا ("Sultan of poets"; born 1526), Turkish poet, called one of the greatest contributors to Turkish literature
  - Cyprian Bazylik (born 1535), Polish composer, poet, printer and writer
  - Baothghalach Mór Mac Aodhagáin (born 1550), Irish poet of the Mac Aodhagáin clan

== See also ==
- 16th century in poetry
- 16th century in literature
- 17th century in poetry
- 17th century in literature
- Dutch Renaissance and Golden Age literature
- Elizabethan literature
- English Madrigal School
- French Renaissance literature
- Renaissance literature
- Spanish Renaissance literature
- University Wits
