= 1597 in poetry =

This article covers 1597 in poetry. Nationality words link to articles with information on the nation's poetry or literature (for instance, Irish or France).

== Works published ==
- Nicholas Breton:
  - The Arbor of Amorous Devises, anthology partly by Breton, probably compiled by the printer, Richard Jones; reprints 10 poems from Brittons Bowre of Delights 1591
  - Auspicante Jehova
- John Dowland, The First Booke of Songes or Ayres of Fowre Partes verse and music (see also Second Booke 1600, Third and Last Booke 1603)
- Michael Drayton, Englands Heroicall Epistles (expanded in 1598; reprinted in The Barrons Wars 1603)
- Joseph Hall, Virgidemiarum, Sixe Bookes
- Henry Lok, Ecclesiastes, Otherwise Called the Preacher
- Gervase Markham, translated from a lost original work by Genevieve Petau de Maulette, Devoreux
- Thomas Middleton, The Wisodome of Solomon Paraphrased
- Thomas Morley, Cazonets; or, Little Short Songs to Foure Voyces, verse and music (see also Canzonets 1593)
- Robert Parry, Sinetes Passion Uppon his Fortunes
- Robert Tofte, Laura: The Toyes of a Traveller; or, The Feast of Fancie, contains a statement, likely untrue, that more than 30 of the poems in the book are not by Tofte
- Nicholas Yonge, Musica Transalpina. Cantus, verse and music (see also Musica Transalpina 1588

== Births ==
Death years link to the corresponding "[year] in poetry" article:

- February 24 – Vincent Voiture (died 1648), French poet and writer
- May 31 – Jean-Louis Guez de Balzac (died 1654), French writer and poet writing verses in both French and Latin
- December 23 – Martin Opitz von Boberfeld (died 1639), German
- Also:
  - Johan van Heemskerk (died 1656), Dutch poet
  - Christopher Harvey (died 1662), English
  - Claude de Malleville (died 1634), French
  - Rachel Speght (death year not known), English polemicist and poet
  - Wang Wei (died 1647), Chinese prostitute and poet

== Deaths ==
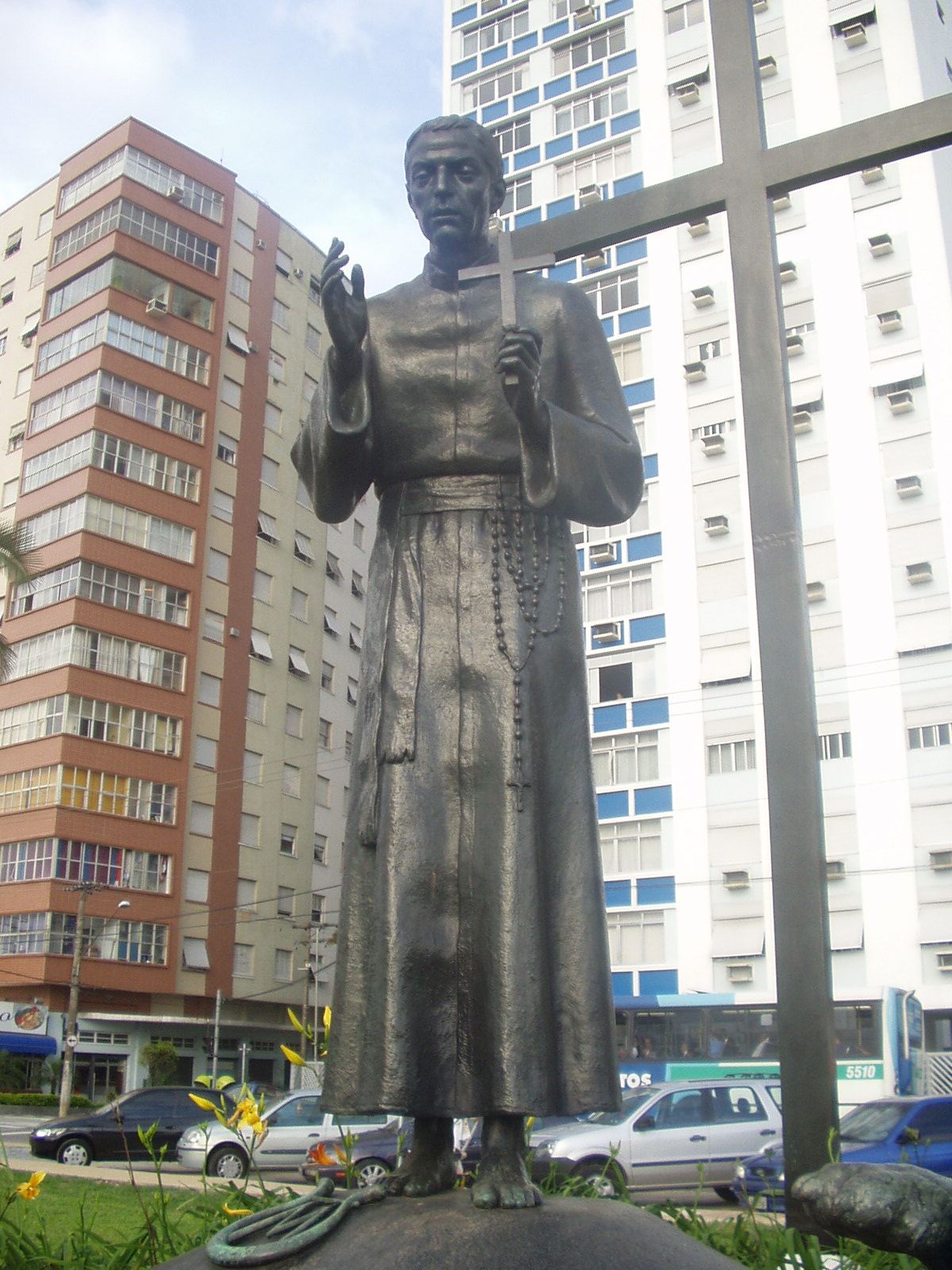
Statue of Joseph of Anchieta in Santos, Brazil

Birth years link to the corresponding "[year] in poetry" article:

- June 6 – William Hunnis (birth year not known), English
- June 9 – Joseph of Anchieta (born 1534), Spanish Jesuit missionary, poet and playwright
- Also:
  - Fernando de Herrera (born c. 1534), Spanish
  - George Turberville, also spelled "Turbervile", death year uncertain (born c. 1544), English poet and translator

== See also ==
- Poetry
- 16th century in poetry
- 16th century in literature
- Dutch Renaissance and Golden Age literature
- Elizabethan literature
- English Madrigal School
- French Renaissance literature
- Renaissance literature
- Spanish Renaissance literature
- University Wits
