= 1691 in poetry =

Nationality words link to articles with information on the nation's poetry or literature (for instance, Irish or France).

== Works published ==
- Richard Ames:
  - The Female Fire-Ships: A satyr against whoring, published anonymously
  - Islington-Wells; or, The Threepenny-academy, published anonymously
- Benjamin Keach, Spiritual Melody
- Nahum Tate, Characters of Vertue and Vice, a verse paraphrase of Joseph Hall's Characters of Vertues and Vices, a 1608 prose work
- Edward Ward, The Poet's Ramble After Riches, published anonymously
- John Wilmot, Earl of Rochester, Poems, &c. on Several Occasions: with Valentinian, a Tragedy, London: Printed for Jacob Tonson, posthumously published

== Births ==
- Seán Clárach Mac Domhnaill (died 1754), Irish poet

== Deaths ==
Birth years link to the corresponding "[year] in poetry" article:

- March 1 – Sultan Bahu (born 1628), Muslim Sufi saint and poet
- October 10 – Isaac de Benserade (born 1613), French poet
- Mathias Balen (born 1611), Dutch historian and poet
- Probable date – Samuel Pordage (born 1633), English poet and cleric

== See also ==
- Poetry
- 17th century in poetry
- 17th century in literature
