= 1603 in poetry =

Nationality words link to articles with information on the nation's poetry or literature (for instance, Irish or France).

== Events ==
- March 24 – Queen Elizabeth I of England dies at Richmond Palace, ending the Elizabethan era begun in 1558, and is succeeded by her cousin King James VI of Scotland (where he has ruled since 1567), thus uniting the crowns of Scotland and England. Ben Jonson and Thomas Dekker collaborate on a pageant to welcome the new king.
- November 17 – Sir Walter Ralegh goes on trial for treason in the converted Great Hall of Winchester Castle. He is found guilty but his life is spared by King James I at this time and he is returned to imprisonment in the Tower of London.

== Works ==
=== Great Britain ===
- Henry Chettle, Englandes Mourning Garment, on the death of Queen Elizabeth
- Juan de la Cueva, La Conquista de Betica, (Spain)
- Samuel Daniel, A Panegyrike Congratulatory Delivered to the Kings Most Excellent Majesty ... With a Defence of Ryme, written in answer to Thomas Campion's Observations on the Art of English Posie 1602
- John Davies of Hereford, Microcosmos
- John Dowland, The Third and Last Booke of Songs or Aires (First Booke, 1597; Second Booke, 1600)
- Michael Drayton, The Barrons Wars in the Raigne of Edward the Second
- Joseph Hall, The Kings Prophecie; or, Weeping Joy
- King James I of England, His Majesties Lepanto: or, Heroicall Song (first published in 1591)
- Elizabeth Melville, later Lady Colville of Culros, Ane Godlie Dreame, in Scottish, English version published in 1604 as A Godly Dreame
- Thomas Newton, Atropoion Delion; or, The Death of Delia
- Samuel Rowlands, Ave Caesar: God Save the King

=== Other ===
- Juan de la Cueva, La Conquista de Betica, Spain

== Births ==
- July 12 – Edward Benlowes, English (died 1676)
- Also:
  - Gabriel Bocángel (died 1658), Spanish playwright and poet
  - Pierre de Boissat (died 1662), French soldier, writer, poet and translator
  - Gysbert Japiks (died 1666), Frisian writer, poet, schoolteacher and cantor

== Deaths ==
- July 22 – Łukasz Górnicki, (born 1527), Polish humanist, writer, poet, secretary and chancellor of Sigismund August of Poland
- Also:
  - Dadu Dayal (born 1544), Indian Sant Mat, poet, and philosopher
  - Emir Sharaf Khan Bidlisi (born 1543), Iranian Kurdish historian, writer and poet

== See also ==
- 17th century in poetry
- 17th century in literature
- Dutch Renaissance and Golden Age literature
- Elizabethan literature
- English Madrigal School
- French Renaissance literature
- Renaissance literature
- Spanish Renaissance literature
- University Wits
