= Jeanne-Catherine Van Goethem =

Flemish poet

Jeanne-Catherine Van Goethem (1720–1776) was a Flemish poet. She was a well known and celebrated poet in her time, and was particularly known for her poem written for the 200th anniversary of the Martyrs of Gorkum. Several of her manuscripts survive. Her production is described as strongly affected by Flemish patriotism and a great love of arts.
