= 1647 in poetry =

This article covers 1647 in poetry. Nationality words link to articles with information on the nation's poetry or literature (for instance, Irish or France).

== Works published ==
=== English ===
- Richard Corbet, Certain Elegant Poems, edited by John Donne the younger (1604–1662) (see also Poetica Stromata 1648).
- Abraham Cowley, The Mistresse; or, Several Copies of Love-Verses.
- Sir Richard Fanshawe, 1st Baronet, translator, Il Pastor Fido, the Faithfull Shepherd anonymously published; from a work by Battista Guarini (see also Il Pastor Fido 1648).
- John Hall of Durham, Poems.
- Christopher Harvey, translator, Schola Cordis [...] in 47 Emblems, published anonymously, adapted from Benedict van Haeften's Schola Cordis 1629; later editions state that Francis Quarles is the author.
- Henry More, Philosophical Poems.
- Francis Quarles, Hosanna; or, Divine Poems on the Passion of Christ.
- Sir Robert Stapylton, Juvenal's Sixteen Satyres; or, A Survey of the Manners and Actions of Mankind.
- George Wither:
  - Amygdala Britannica, Almonds for Parrot's, published anonymously.
  - Carmen Expostulatorium; or, A Timely Expostulation.

=== Other languages ===
- François Vavasseur, Antonius Godellus, episcopus Grassensis, a satire on Antoine Godeau; France
- Johan van Heemskerk, Batavische Arcadia, written 1637; Netherlands

== Works incorrectly dated this year ==
- Robert Herrick, Hesperides; or, The Works both Humane and Divine of Robert Herrick Esq., the book states it was published this year, but it was published in 1648, according to The Concise Oxford Chronology of English Literature

== Births ==
Death years link to the corresponding "[year] in poetry" article:

- Nicholas Noyes (died 1717), English Colonial American clergyman, one of those presiding over the Salem witch trials and a poet.
- John Wilmot, 2nd Earl of Rochester (died 1680), English writer of much satirical and bawdy poetry.

== Deaths ==
Birth years link to the corresponding "[year] in poetry" article:

- May 21 – Pieter Corneliszoon Hooft (born 1581), Dutch historian, poet and playwright.
- Moses Belmonte (born 1619), polyglot poet and translator.
- Johann Heermann (born 1585), German poet and hymn writer.
- Claude de Malleville (born 1597), French poet.
- Francis Meres (born 1565), English churchman, author, critic and poet.
- Wang Wei (born 1597), Chinese.

== See also ==
- Poetry.
- 17th century in poetry.
- 17th century in literature.
- Cavalier poets in England, who supported the monarch against the puritans in the English Civil War.
