= 1598 in poetry =

This article covers 1598 in poetry. Nationality words link to articles with information on the nation's poetry or literature (for instance, Irish or France).

== Works published ==
=== England ===
- Richard Barnfield:
  - The Encomium of Lady Pecunia; or, The Praise of Money
  - Poems in Divers Humours
- Nicholas Breton, A Solemne Passion of the Soules Love
- Richard Carew, published anonymously, A Herrings Tale
- George Chapman:
  - Seven Bookes of the Iliades of Homere, Prince of Poets, contains books 1–2, 7–9 (see also Achilles Shield 1598, Homer Prince of Poets 1609, The Iliads of Homer 1611, Homers Odysses 1614, Twenty-four Bookes of Homers Odisses 1615, The Whole Workes of Homer 1616)
  - Achilles Shield
- Thomas Churchyard, A Wished Reformacion of Wicked Rebellion (expanded in 1611 as Queen Anna's New World of Words)
- Everard Guilpin, published anonymously, Skialetheia. Or, A Shadow of Truth, in Certaine Epigrams or Satyres
- Christopher Marlowe, Hero and Leander, published posthumously and completed by George Chapman (who divided the poem into two sestiads and adding four more written by Chapman himself); described as "this unfinished Tragedy", yet possibly considered complete by Marlowe
- John Marston:
  - The Metamorphosis of Pigmalians Image
  - The Scourge of Villanie, published under the pen name "William Kinsayder"
- Francis Meres, Palladis Tamia. Wits Treasury, valued for its inclusion of a list of plays by Shakespeare and also a mention that Shakespeare's "sugar'd sonnets" are circulating privately; the second in the "Wits Series" (see also Ling, Politeuphuia 1597; Allot, Wits Theater 1599; Wrednot, Palladis Palatium 1604)
- Francis Rous, Thule; or, Vertues Historie
- Sir Philip Sidney, Arcadia, a corrected version of the poem which had originally appeared in a pirated version in 1593, although even this version was not completely free from error. It was prepared under the supervision of his sister, the Countess of Pembroke; in the same volume appeared Astrophel and Stella, also originally published (posthumously) twice in 1593 (first from an unauthorized, corrupt text and in an unauthorized corrected version). Sources differ on the publishing year of this edition, with The Concise Oxford Chronology of English Literature giving "circa 1597", and other sources, including, Mona Wilson, stating this year.
- Thomas Speght, The Workes of our Antient and Lerned English Poet, Geffrey Chaucer, Newly Printed
- Joshua Sylvester, The Second Weeke or Childhood of the World, the first part of Sylvester's translation of Guillaume de Salluste Du Bartas
- Robert Tofte:
  - Alba: The months minde of a melancholy lover
  - Orlando Inamorato, translated from Matteo Maria Boiardo's Orlando Innamorato

=== Other languages ===
- Jean de Sponde, Amours; publication year uncertain; France
- Torquato Tasso, Le sette giornate, Italy
- Lope de Vega, Spain:
  - La Arcadia
  - La Dragontea, an epic poem about Sir Francis Drake

== Births ==
Death years link to the corresponding "[year] in poetry" article:

- March 12 – Guillaume Colletet (died 1659), French
- August 7 – Georg Stiernhielm (died 1672), Swedish civil servant, linguist and poet
- Also – Johann George Moeresius (died 1657), Polish poet and rector

== Deaths ==
Birth years link to the corresponding "[year] in poetry" article:

- January 9 – Jasper Heywood (died 1535) English Jesuit, poet and translator
- June 1 – Thomas Preston (born 1537), English poet and perhaps playwright, a master of Trinity Hall, Cambridge
- August – Alexander Montgomerie (born 1550), Scottish Catholic courtier and poet
- Also – Henri Estienne (born 1528), French philologist, poet and humanist

== See also ==
- Poetry
- 16th century in poetry
- 16th century in literature
- Dutch Renaissance and Golden Age literature
- Elizabethan literature
- English Madrigal School
- French Renaissance literature
- Renaissance literature
- Spanish Renaissance literature
- University Wits
