= 1612 in poetry =

This article is a brief survey of works of poetry published or composed during 1612, arranged by nationality with links to articles containing information on the specific nation's poetry or literature (for instance, Irish or France).

== Works ==
=== Great Britain ===
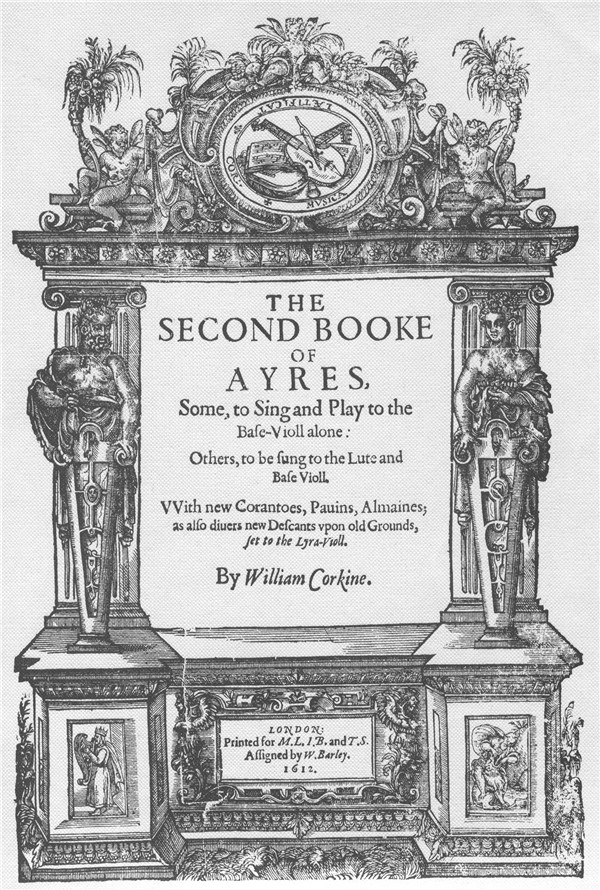
William Corkine's Second Booke of Ayres, published this year

- George Chapman, translator, Petrarchs Seven Penitentiall Psalms, Paraphrastically Translated
- William Corkine, Second Booke of Ayres, some to sing and play to the Basse-Violl alone: others to be sung to the Lute and Bass Viollin, including "Break of Day" by John Donne
- John Davies, The Muses Sacrifice
- John Donne, The First Anniversarie, An Anatomie of the World [...] The Second Anniversarie. Of the Progres of the Soule, anonymously published together, although The Second Anniversarie has a separate, dated, title page (and was originally published as An Anatomy of the World 1611)
- John Dowland, A Pilgrimes Solace, verse and music
- Michael Drayton, Poly-Olbion, Part I, a topographical poem describing England and Wales; with notes by John Selden (Part 2 published 1622)
- Orlando Gibbons, First Set of Madrigals and Mottets
- Richard Johnson, A Crowne-Garland of Goulden Roses, Gathered Out of Englands Royal Garden
- The Passionate Pilgrim, expanded edition, anthology
- Henry Peacham, the younger, Minerva Britannia; or, A Garden of Heroical Devises
- Samuel Rowlands:
  - The Knave of Cubbes, published anonymously; the first edition (for which no copy is extant), titled A Merry Meeting, published 1600 but was ordered burned
  - The Knave of Harts, published anonymously
- "W.S." (but probably by John Ford), A Funeral Elegy for Master William Peter
- John Taylor, The Sculler

==== On the death of Prince Henry ====
See also 1613 in poetry

The November 6 death of Henry Frederick, Prince of Wales, at age 18, occasioned these poems:

- Sir William Alexander, An Elegie on the Death of Prince Henrie, on the death of Henry Frederick, Prince of Wales
- Joshua Sylvester, Lachrimae Lachrimarum; or, The Distillation of Teares Shede for the Untimely Death of the Incomparable Prince Panaretus, also includes poems in English, French, Latin and Italian by Walter Quin (A third edition was published in 1613.)
- George Wither, Prince Henries Obsequies; or, Mournefull Elegies Upon his Death

=== Other ===
- Luis de Góngora - Fábula de Polifemo y Galatea (Fable of Polyphemus and Galatea) Spain
- Jean Vauquelin de La Fresnaye, Les Œuvres ("Works"), published posthumously in Caen, France

== Births ==
- February 8 – Samuel Butler (died 1680), English
- March – Sir Thomas Salusbury, 2nd Baronet (died 1643), Welsh politician and poet
- March 4 (bapt.) – Jan Vos (died 1667), Dutch playwright and poet
- March 20 – Anne Bradstreet, née Dudley (died 1672), "the chief poetess of Colonial America", English-born Puritan poet
- October 15 – Isaac de Benserade (died 1691), French playwright and court poet, a member of the Académie française in 1674
- October 25 – James Graham (died 1650), 5th Earl and 1st Marquis of Montrose (Scottish) soldier and poet
- Also:
  - Edward King (drowned 1637), Irish poet who wrote in Latin in England; a friend of John Milton
  - Zhou Lianggong (died 1672), Chinese poet, essayist and art historian
  - Łukasz Opaliński (died 1666), Polish nobleman, poet, writer and political activist

== Deaths ==
- May 20 (bur.) – William Fowler (born c. 1560), Scottish-born poet, writer, courtier and translator
- July 24 – John Salusbury (born 1567), Welsh knight, politician and poet
- October – Juan de la Cueva (born 1543), Spanish dramatist and poet
- October 7 – Giovanni Battista Guarini (born 1538), Italian poet, dramatist and diplomat
- November 20 – Sir John Harington (born 1560), English courtier, author, poet and inventor of a flush toilet
- Also – Ercole Bottrigari (born 1531), Italian scholar, mathematician, poet, music theorist, architect and composer
