= 1702 in poetry =

Nationality words link to articles with information on the nation's poetry or literature (for instance, Irish or France).

== Works published ==
- Matsuo Bashō, Oku no Hosomichi (奥の細道, "The Narrow Road to the Interior" or "The Narrow Road to the Deep North") is published posthumously. This poetic travel diary chronicles a journey to the Northern Provinces of Honshū undertaken in 1689.
- Edward Bysshe, The Art of English Poetry (criticism)
- Daniel Defoe:
  - The Mock-Mourners: A satyr, by way of an elegy on King William
  - Reformation of Manners: A satyr, published anonymously
  - The Spanish Descent
- John Dennis, The Monument, a memorial poem on the death of William III on March 8
- George Farquhar, Love and Business, verse and prose
- William King - De Origine Mali (in Latin)
- Mary Mollineux, Fruits of Retirement; or, Miscellaneous Poems, Moral and Divine
- Nicholas Noyes, "A Prefatory Poem", the preface for Cotton Mather's Magnalia Christi Americana, English Colonial America
- John Pomfret, Miscellany Poems on Several Occasions
- Sir Charles Sedley, Miscellaneous Works (posthumous)
- Joseph Stennett, A Poem to the Memory of His Late Majesty William the Third

== Births ==
Death years link to the corresponding "[year] in poetry" article:

- June 26 – Philip Doddridge (died 1751), English Nonconformist preacher and writer
- August 26 – Judith Madan, née Cowper (died 1781), English poet
- October 24 – Yokoi Yayū 横井 也有, born Yokoi Tokitsura (横井 時般), taking pseudonym Tatsunojō (died 1783), Japanese samurai, scholar of Kokugaku and haikai poet
- Also – Kenrick Prescot (died 1779), English poet
- Approximate date
  - David Mallet (died 1765), Scottish poet and dramatist
  - Francis Williams (died 1770), black Jamaican scholar and poet
  - Antonina Niemiryczowa (died 1780), Polish poet

== Deaths ==
Birth years link to the corresponding "[year] in poetry" article:

- May 26 – Zeb-un-Nissa (Makhfi) (born 1638), Persian poet and Mughal princess
- Late November – John Pomfret (born 1667), English poet and clergyman
- December 18 (bur.) – Laurens Bake (born 1629), Dutch poet

== See also ==
- Poetry
- List of years in poetry
- 18th century in poetry
- 18th century in literature
- Augustan poetry
