= 1721 in poetry =

This article covers 1721 in poetry. Nationality words link to articles with information on the nation's poetry or literature (for instance, Irish or France).

== Works published ==
=== United Kingdom ===
- Joseph Addison, The Works of Joseph Addison, edited by Thomas Tickell
- John Dennis, Original Letters, Familiar, Moral and Critical. In Two Volumes, including literary criticism
- Charles Gildon, Laws of Poetry, criticism
- Alexander Pennecuik, An Ancient Prophecy Concerning Stock-Jobbing, and the Conduct of the Directors of the South-Sea-Company
- Thomas Parnell, Night-Piece on Death a notable work by one of the Graveyard poets
- Matthew Prior, Colin's Mistakes, published anonymously (died this year)
- Allan Ramsay, Poems
- Jonathan Swift:
  - The Bubble
  - Letter of Advice to a Young Poet
- Thomas Tickell, Kensington Garden, published anonymously this year, although the book states "1722" (see also Joseph Addison, above)

=== Other ===
- Barthold Heinrich Brockes, Earthly Pleasure in God, Germany

== Births ==
Death years link to the corresponding "[year] in poetry" article:

- March 17 – James Dance, pseudonym of James Dance (died 1774), English poet, playwright, actor and cricketer
- March 19 – Tobias Smollett (died 1771), Scottish-born physician, novelist and poet
- July 9 – Johann Nikolaus Götz (died 1781), German poet
- August 21 – Lucretia Wilhelmina van Merken (died 1789), Dutch poet and playwright
- September 17 – Johann Adolf Schlegel (died 1793), German poet
- October 5 – William Wilkie (died 1772), Scottish poet and agriculturalist
- November 9 – Mark Akenside (died 1770), English poet
- December 25 – William Collins (died 1759), English poet
- date not known
  - James Grainger (died 1766), Scottish-born physician, poet and translator
  - Robert Potter (died 1804), English translator, poet and cleric

== Deaths ==
Birth years link to the corresponding "[year] in poetry" article:

- September 18 – Matthew Prior (born 1664), English poet (see "Works", above)
- February 24 – John Sheffield, 1st Duke of Buckingham and Normanby (born 1648), English statesman and poet
- date not known – Rupa Bhavani (born 1621), Indian, Kashmiri-language poet

== See also ==
- Poetry
- List of years in poetry
- List of years in literature
- 18th century in poetry
- 18th century in literature
- Augustan poetry
- Scriblerus Club

== Notes ==
- "A Timeline of English Poetry" Web page of the Representative Poetry Online Web site, University of Toronto
