= 1689 in poetry =

Nationality words link to articles with information on the nation's poetry or literature (for instance, Irish or France).

== Events ==
- May 26 – Matsuo Bashō begins the journey described in Oku no Hosomichi ("Narrow road to the interior") on which he visits Kisakata, and later composes a waka about Kisakata's islands.
- Thomas Shadwell becomes Poet Laureate of England.

== Works published ==
=== Great Britain ===
- Aphra Behn, The History of the Nun; or, The Fair Vow-Breaker, Behn died on April 16 of this year
- Charles Cotton, Poems on Several Occasions
- Robert Gould, Poems
- Nathaniel Lee, On the Death of Mrs Behn, Aphra Behn died on April 16 of this year

=== Other ===
- Michael Wigglesworth, Riddles Unriddled; or, Christian Paradoxes, a poem published in the 14th edition of Meat Out of the Eater, English Colonial America

== Births ==
Death years link to the corresponding "[year] in poetry" article:

- February 25 – Khushal Khattaktak (born 1613), Pashtun warrior, poet and tribal chief
- May 3 (bapt.) – William Broome (died 1745), English poet and translator
- May 15 – Lady Mary Wortley Montagu (died 1762), English aristocrat and writer
- November 18 – Shah Abdul Latif Bhittai (died 1752), Sufi scholar and saint, poet of the Sindhi language

== Deaths ==
Birth years link to the corresponding "[year] in poetry" article:

- January – William Chamberlayne (born c.1619), English poet and playwright
- April 16 – Aphra Behn (born 1640), English woman playwright and poet
- August 21 – William Cleland (born 1661), Scottish poet and soldier, killed at Battle of Dunkeld
- October 4 – Quirinus Kuhlmann (born 1651), German Baroque poet and mystic, burned at the stake
- December 13 – Zbigniew Morsztyn (born 1628), Polish poet
- date unknown – Gwilym Puw (born 1626), Welsh Catholic poet and Royalist officer

== See also ==
- Poetry
- 17th century in poetry
- 17th century in literature
- Restoration literature
