= 1602 in poetry =

This article covers 1602 in poetry. Nationality words link to articles with information on the nation's poetry or literature (for instance, Irish or France).

== Works ==
=== Great Britain ===
- William Basse, Three Pastoral Elegies
- Francis Beaumont, Salamacis and Hermaphroditus, published anonymously; a translation from Ovid's Metamorphoses
- John Beaumont, The Metamorphoses of Tabacco
- Nicholas Breton:
  - The Mother's Blessing
  - Olde Mad-Cappes New Gally-Mawfrey
  - The Soules Harmony
  - A True Description of Unthankfulnesse; or, An Enemie to Ingratitude
- Thomas Campion's Observations in the Art of English Poesie (in response, Samuel Daniel published Defence of Ryme 1603); London: by Richard Field for Andrew Wise; criticism
- John Davies, Mirum in Modum
- Francis and Walter Davison, editors, A Poetical Rhapsody
- Thomas Deloney, Strange Histories of Kings, Princes, Dukes, Earles, Lords, Ladies, Knights, and Gentlemen, published anonymously, with music
- Samuel Rowlands, 'Tis Merrie When Gossips Meete (has been attributed to Robert Greene, and part of it is plagiarized from him)
- Robert Southwell, St. Peter's Complaint, with Other Poems
- William Warner, Albions England, fifth edition, in 13 books, with Epitome

=== Other ===
- Jean Bertaut, Recueil de quelques vers amoureux,("Collection of Some Amorous Verse"), France
- Giambattista Marino, Le Rime, Italy
- Jean Passerat, Le premier livre des poèmes. Reueus & augmentez par l'autheur en ceste derniere édition, à Paris
- Lope de Vega, La hermosura de Angélica ("The Beauty of Angelica"), Spain
- Cristóbal de Virués, El Monserrate segundo Spain

== Births ==
- January 24 – Mildmay Fane, 2nd Earl of Westmorland (died 1666), English nobleman, politician and writer
- Also:
  - Giacomo Badoaro (died 1654), Venetian nobleman and poet
  - Owen Feltham (died 1668), English essayist and poet
  - Juan Pérez de Montalbán (died 1638), Spanish dramatist, poet and novelist
  - Claude de L'Estoile (died 1652), French playwright and poet
  - Pierre Le Moyne (died 1671), French Jesuit poet
  - William Strode (died 1645), English poet

== Deaths ==
- April 3 – Siôn Tudur (born 1522), Welsh language poet
- August 29 – Sebastian Klonowic (born 1545), Polish poet and composer
- September 14 – Jean Passerat (born 1534), French political satirist and poet
- October 30 – Jean-Jacques Boissard (born 1528), French antiquary and Latin poet
- Also:
  - Martín del Barco Centenera (born 1535), Spanish cleric, explorer, author and poet
  - Bartholomew Griffin (born unknown), English poet
  - Hans Wilhelm Kirchhof (born 1525), German Landsknecht, baroque poet and translator

== See also ==
- 16th century in literature
- Dutch Renaissance and Golden Age literature
- Elizabethan literature
- English Madrigal School
- French Renaissance literature
- Renaissance literature
- Spanish Renaissance literature
- University Wits
