= 1687 in poetry =

Nationality words link to articles with information on the nation's poetry or literature (for instance, Irish or France).

== Events ==
- William Winstanley publishes the Lives of the most famous English poets from which biographical data on a number of poets can be obtained

== Works published ==
=== Great Britain ===
- John Cutts, (later Baron Cutts), Poetical Exercises written on several occasions, published anonymously
- John Dryden:
  - The Hind and the Panther, published anonymously (see also the work by Matthew Prior and Charles Montagu, below)
  - A Song for St. Cecilia's Day
- Thomas D'Urfey, A Compleat Collection of Mr D'Urfey's Songs and Odes
- John Norris, A Collection of Miscellanies, prose and poetry
- Matthew Prior and Charles Montagu, The Hind and the Panther Transvers'd to the Story of the Country-Mouse and the City-Mouse, published anonymously, a burlesque of John Dryden's The Hind and the Panther (see above)
- Thomas Shadwell, translator, The Tenth Satyr of Juvenal, with English and Latin on facing pages

=== Other ===
- John Cotton II, Poem Occasioned by the Death of [...] John Alden, English Colonial American (Massachusetts)
- Benjamin Harris, compiler, The New England Primer, English Colonial American

== Births ==
Death years link to the corresponding "[year] in poetry" article:

- June 13 – Paolo Rolli (died 1765), Italian librettist, poet and translator
- c. August 26 – Henry Carey (suicide 1743), English poet, dramatist and songwriter
- Mary Chandler (died 1745), English poet and milliner

== Deaths ==
Birth years link to the corresponding "[year] in poetry" article:

- March 28 – Constantijn Huygens (born 1596), Dutch poet and composer
- April 16 – George Villiers, 2nd Duke of Buckingham (born 1628), English statesman and poet
- April 28 – Charles Cotton (born 1630), English poet and writer
- May 6 – Thomas Washbourne (born 1606), English clergyman and poet
- September 1 – Henry More (born 1614), English philosopher and poet
- October 21 – Edmund Waller (born 1606), English poet and politician
- Pierre Petit (born 1617), French scholar, physician, poet and Latin writer

== See also ==
- Poetry
- 17th century in poetry
- 17th century in literature
- Restoration literature
