= 1650 in poetry =

This article covers 1650 in poetry. Nationality words link to articles with information on the nation's poetry or literature (for instance, Irish or France).

== Works published ==
- Robert Baron, Pocula Castalia
- Anne Bradstreet, The Tenth Muse Lately Sprung Up in America American poet published this volume in London; full title: "The Tenth Muse, lately Sprung up in America, or Several Poems Compiled with Great Variety of Wit and Learning, Full of Delight, Wherein especially is Contained a Complete Discourse and Description of the Four Elements, Constitutions, Ages of Man, Seasons of the Year, together with an exact Epitome of the Four Monarchies, viz., The Assyrian, Persian, Grecian, Roman, Also a Dialogue between Old England and New, concerning the late troubles. With divers other pleasand and serious Poems, By a Gentlewoman in those parts"; includes "In Praise of Mistress Bradstreet", a poem by Nathaniel Ward; the first verse collection written in the Western Hemisphere by a European and one of the best-selling volumes in 17th century London; the book was republished in 1678 with significant additions, six years after her death
- William Davenant, A Discourse upon Gondibert, an heroick poem, also known simply as Gondibert, first published this year unfinished, then published again in 1651 in its final form (second edition in 1653 with additional poems written by the author's friends)
- Robert Heath, Clarastella: Together with poems occasional, elegies, epigrams, satyrs
- Andrew Marvell, An Horatian Ode upon Cromwell's Return from Ireland
- John Tatham, Ostella; or, The Faction of Love and Beauty Reconcil'd
- Henry Vaughan, Silex Scintillans; or, Sacred Poems and Private Ejaculations (see also Silex Scintillans 1655)
- Thomas Vaughan writing under the pen name "Eugenius Philalethes", Anthroposophia Theomagica; or, A Discourse of the Nature of Man and his State After Death

== Births ==
Death years link to the corresponding "[year] in poetry" article:

- June 14 – Carlo Alessandro Guidi (died 1712), Italian lyric poet

== Deaths ==
Birth years link to the corresponding "[year] in poetry" article:

- June – Jean Rotrou (born 1609), French poet and tragedian
- May 21 – James Graham, 1st Marquess of Montrose (born 1612), Scottish noble and poet, executed
- December 13 – Phineas Fletcher (born 1582), English poet
- c. December – Martin Peerson (born 1573), English composer, organist and virginalist, writer of hymns, madrigals and other sacred and secular music
- Sheikh Muhammad (born 1560), Indian Marathi language religious leader and poet
- Tukaram (born 1608), Sant (Saint) and spiritual poet during a Bhakti movement

== See also ==
- Poetry
- 17th century in poetry
- 17th century in literature
- Cavalier poets in England, who supported the monarch against the puritans in the English Civil War
