= Gunno Dahlstierna =

Swedish poet (1661–1709)

Gunno Dahlstierna (September 7, 1661 – September 7, 1709) was a Swedish poet.

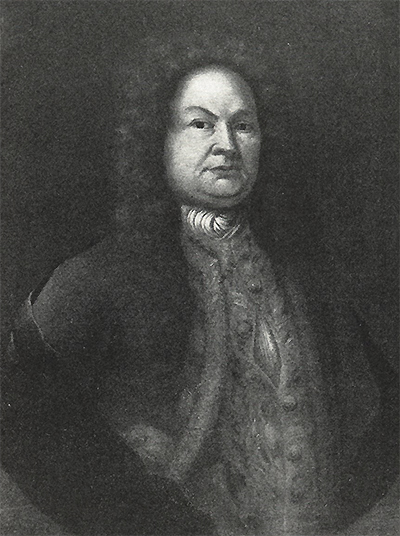

== Biography ==
Gunno Dahlstierna whose original surname was Eurelius, was born in the parish of Ör (now part of Mellerud Municipality) in Dalsland, where his father was rector. He entered the University of Uppsala in 1677, and after gaining his degree entered the government office of land-surveying. He was sent in 1681 on professional business to Livonia, then under Swedish rule.

A dissertation read at Leipzig in 1687 brought him the offer of a professorial chair in the university, which he refused. Returning to Sweden he executed commissions of land-surveying directed by King Charles XI, and in 1699 he became head of the whole department. In 1702 he was ennobled under the name of Dahlstjerna. He wandered over the whole of the coast of the Baltic: Livonia, Rügen and Swedish Pomerania, preparing maps which still exist in the office of public land-surveying in Stockholm. His death, which took place in Pomerania on his forty-eighth birthday, is said to have been hastened by the disastrous news of the Battle of Poltava.

Dahlstierna's patriotism was touching in its pathos and intensity, and during his long periods of professional exile he comforted himself by the composition of songs to his beloved Sweden. His genius was most irregular, but at his best he easily surpasses all the Swedish poets of his time. His best-known original work is Kungaskald (Stettin, 1697), an elegy on the death of Charles XI. It is written in alexandrines, arranged in ottava rima. The poem is pompous and allegorical, but there are passages full of melody and high thoughts. Dahlstjerna was a reformer in language, and it has been well said by Atterbom that in this poem "he treats the Swedish speech just as dictatorially as Charles XI and Charles XII treated the Swedish nation." In 1690 was printed at Stettin his paraphrase of the Pastor Fido of Guarini. His most popular work is his Götha kämpavisa om Konungen och Herr Peder ("The Goth's Battle Song, concerning the King and Master Peter"; Stockholm, 1701). The King is Charles XII and Master Peter is the tsar of Russia. This spirited ballad lived almost until our own days on the lips of the people as a folk-song.

== Works ==
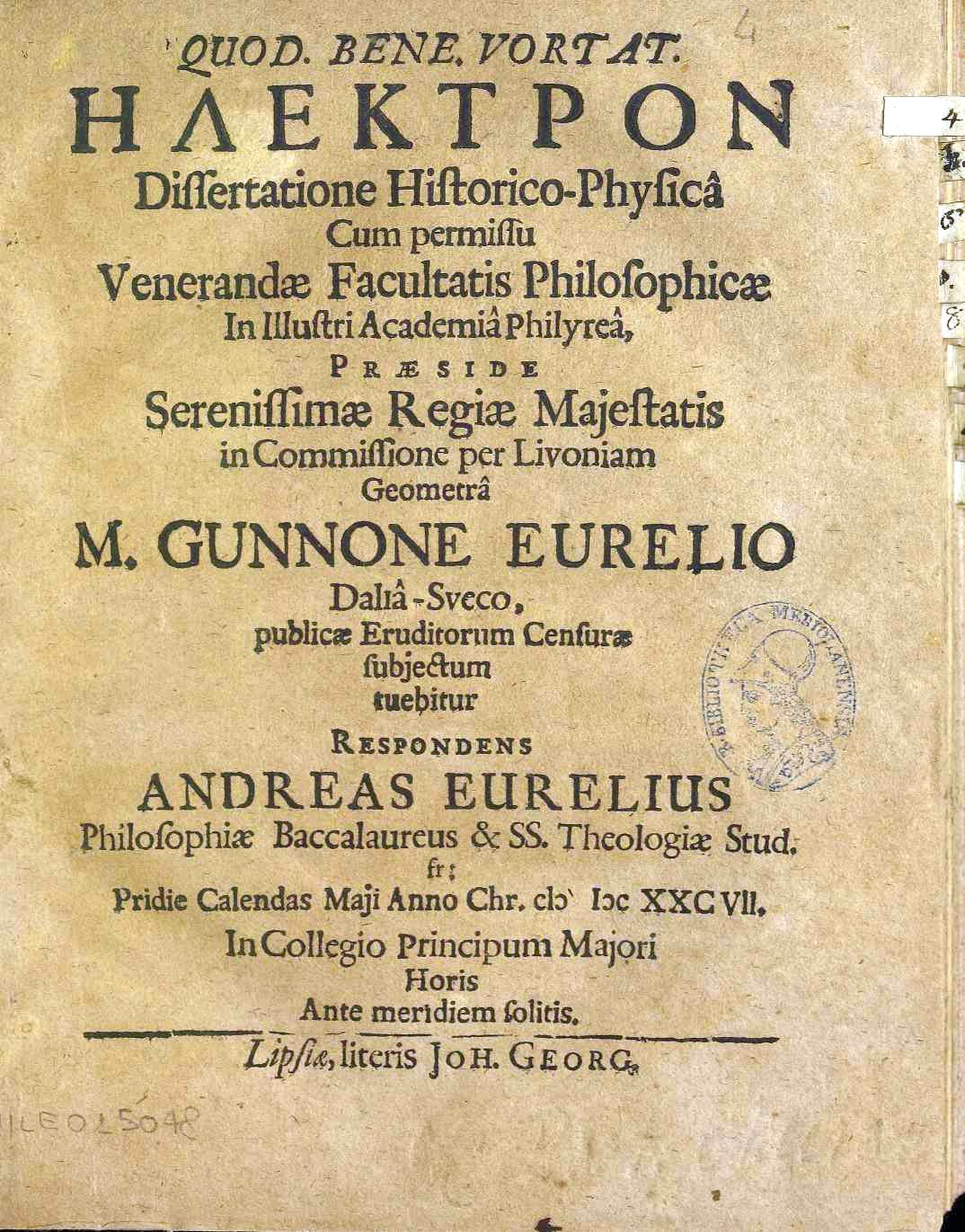
Elektron, 1687

The works of Dahlstierna have been collected by P. Hanselli, in the Samlade Vitterhetsarbeten af svenska Författare från Stjernhjelm till Dalin (Uppsala, 1856, &c.).

=== Editions ===
- Elektron (in Latin). Leipzig: Johann Georg. 1687.
