= 1617 in poetry =

Nationality words link to articles with information on the nation's poetry or literature (for instance, Irish or France).

== Events ==
- James I of England creates Poet Laureate position for Ben Jonson

== Works published ==
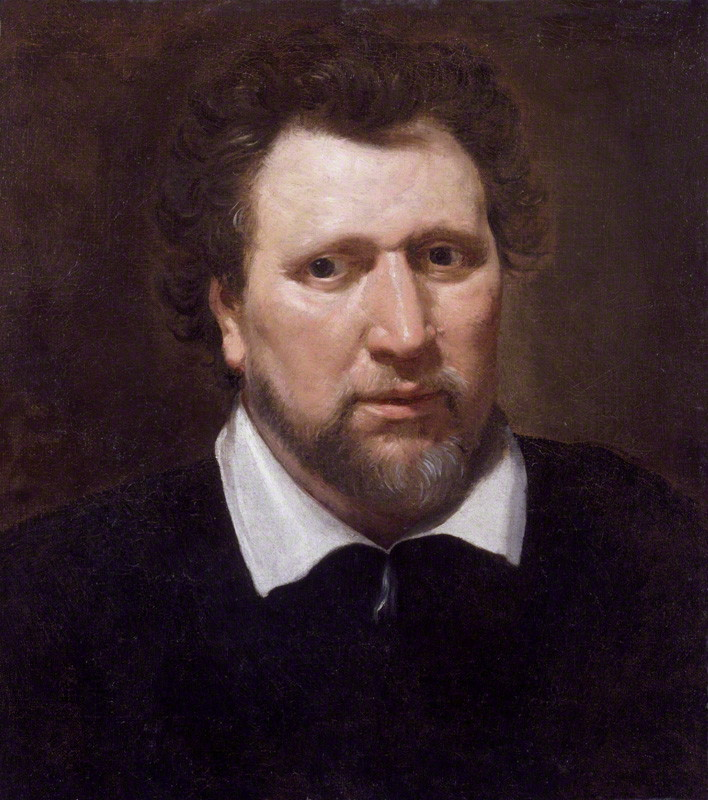
Ben Jonson, after a portrait by Abraham Blyenberch, painted about this year

=== Great Britain ===
- John Davies, published anonymously, Wits Bedlam, epigrams
- Leonard Digges, The Rape of Proserpine, translated from the Latin of Claudius Claudianus' De raptu Proserpinae
- William Drummond, published anonymously, Forth Feasting, written on the occasion of James I's visit to Scotland

=== Other ===
- Martin Opitz Aristarchus, German poet and writer in Latin, in this book championing the purity of the German language
- Antoine Girard de Saint-Amant, A la solitude, ("Solitude"), an ode (untranslated text in French) France

== Births ==
Death years link to the corresponding "[year] in poetry" article:

- April 4 – Sir George Wharton, 1st Baronet (died 1681), English Cavalier soldier and astrologer, also known as a poet
- September 25 (bapt.) – Henry Birkhead (died 1696), English academic, lawyer, Latin poet and founder of the Oxford Chair of Poetry
- December 9 – Richard Lovelace (died 1657), English Cavalier poet
- Peter Folger (died 1690), English-born poet, Nantucket settler, and maternal grandfather of Benjamin Franklin
- Pierre Petit (died 1687), French scholar, physician, poet and Latin writer

== Deaths ==
Birth years link to the corresponding "[year] in poetry" article:

- August 8 – Tarquinia Molza (born 1542), Italian singer and poet
- Giovanni Botero (born 1544), Italian political theorist, priest, poet, and diplomat
- Keshavdas (born 1555), Sanskrit scholar and Hindi poet
- Riccardo Luisini (born 1535), Italian, Latin-language poet
- Eochaidh Ó hÉoghusa (born 1567), Irish
- François du Souhait (born between 1570 and 1580), French language translator, novelist, poet, satirist, and moral philosopher

== See also ==
- Poetry
- 16th century in poetry
- 16th century in literature
