= 1709 in poetry =

This article covers 1709 in poetry. Nationality words link to articles with information on the nation's poetry or literature (for instance, Irish or France).

== Works published ==
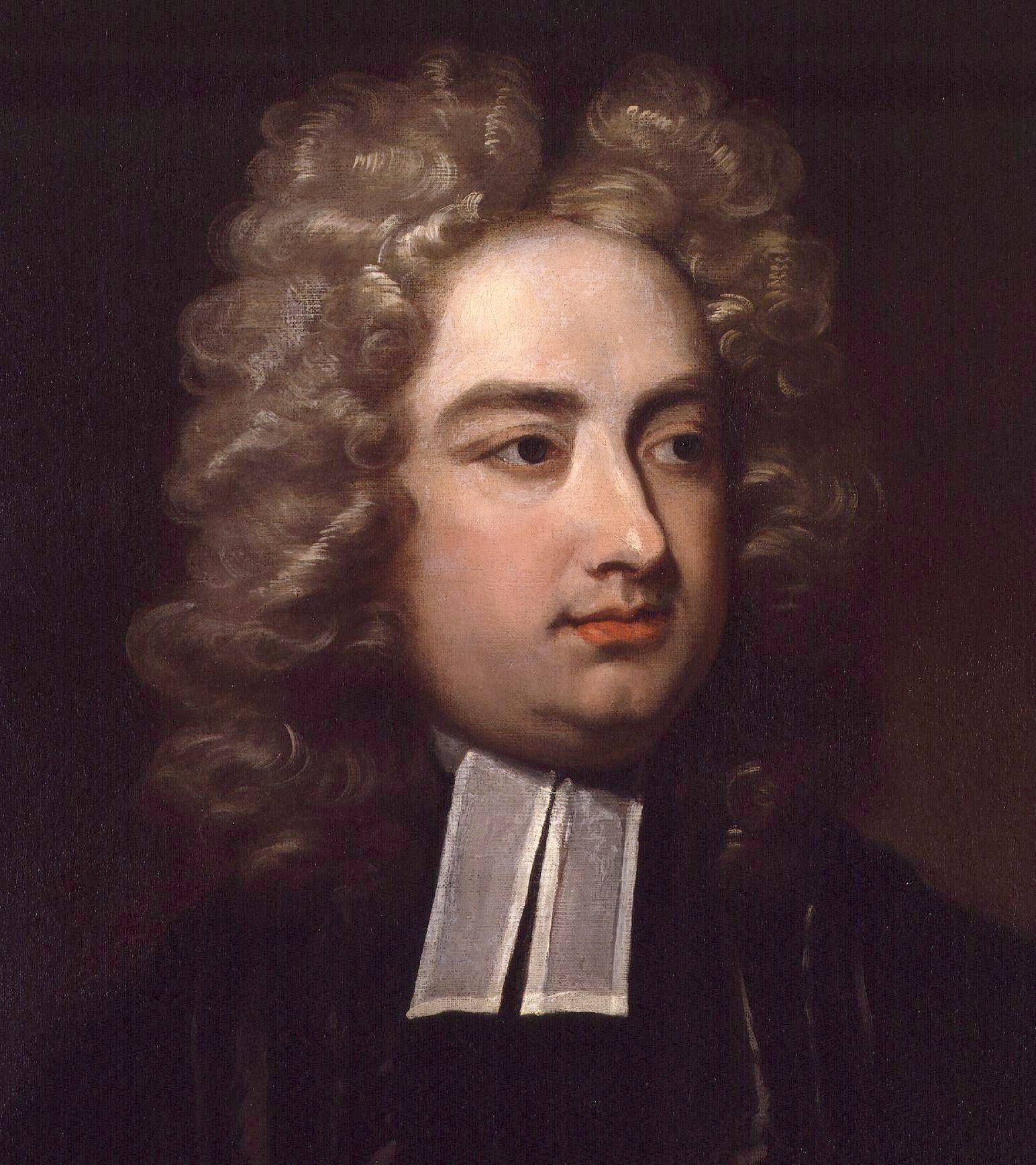
Jonathan Swift painted this year or in 1710, by Charles Jervas

- Sir Richard Blackmore, Instructions to Vander Bank; published anonymously, sequel to Advice to the Poets (1708)
- Samuel Cobb, The Female Reign
- John Dryden, editor, Poetical Miscellanies: The Sixth Part (usually known as Dryden's Miscellanies or Tonson's Miscellanies), sixth in a series of anthologies published by Jacob Tonson from 1684 to this year The 752-page volume, printed on thin paper without book covers (which buyers could arrange to get), the dimensions of which were "roughly that of a middling-sized modern paperback". Publication had been repeatedly delayed. According to Maynard Mack, the book, like most modern anthologies, "featured mainly the work of writers born to be forgotten", although it included two poems by Jonathan Swift and three by Alexander Pope. (see "Alexander Pope's career launched in Poetical Miscellanies" subsection, below)
- William King, Miscellanies in Prose and Verse
- Bernard Lintott, publisher, Collection of Poems
- Experience Mayhew, Massachusee Psalter, English, Colonial America
- John Philips, Cider
- John Reynolds, Death's Vision Represented in a Philosophical Sacred Poem
- Jonathan Swift:
  - Baucis and Philemon
  - Description of the Morning
  - A Famous Prediction of Merlin, the British Wizard
  - A Project for the Advancement of Religion and the Reformation of Manners, published anonymously "by a person of quality"

=== Alexander Pope's career launched in Poetical Miscellanies ===
On May 2, Alexander Pope's career as a poet was launched with the publication of the anthology Poetical Miscellanies, The Sixth Part, edited by John Dryden. The publisher, Jacob Tonson, had solicited poems from Pope for the volume three years before; but publication was delayed and finally occurred three weeks before Pope's 21st birthday. Pope did not visit London at the time of publication, instead travelling there in June. Tonson was a hard bargainer, and paid Pope 13 guineas, for the young man's verses (about two pence per line). Pope would eventually become a hard bargainer himself in dealing with publishers, and although he became good friends with Tonson, he hardly ever wrote for him again.

Pope's January and May; Or, The Merchant's Tale, a story about a young wife and the old husband she cuckolds (on pages 172–224) retold part of Geoffrey Chaucer's Canterbury Tales (lines 817-720 of Pope's version):

Thus ends our Tale, whose Moral next to make,
Let all wise Husbands hence Example take;
And pray, to crown the Pleasure of their Lives,
To be so well deluded by their Wives.

The poet also contributed a translation, The Episode of Sarpedon, Translated from the Twelfth and Sixteenth Books of Homer's Iliads (pages 301–323). John Denham, a poet of Dryden's generation, had written the best-known translation of Sarpedon's speech. According to the 20th-century critic and Pope biographer Maynard Mack, Pope's version shined in comparison, and when both versions were weighed together, "the coffee-house critics must have sensed [...] that a new star of some magnitude was rising in their sky".

But the four Pastorals (pages 721–751) which concluded the volume, would have been the works on which Pope pinned most of his hopes for recognition, according to Mack, because the genre was what Virgil and various Renaissance critics deemed a proper first test for an aspiring poet.

On May 17, Pope's friend, Wycherley, wrote to him that "all the best Judges [...] like your part of the Book so well, that the rest is lik'd the worse". Pope wrote back three days later, referring to Tonson's low payments but valuable publicizing (by including him in what the title page of the anthology called "Eminent hands"):

I can be content with a bare saving [that is, neither winning nor losing] game, without being thought an Eminent hand, (with which Title Jacob has graciously dignify'd his adventurers and voluntiers in Poetry). Jacob creates Poets, as Kings sometimes do Knights, not for their honour, but for money. Certainly he ought to be esteem'd a worker of Miracles, who is grown rich by Poetry.

What Authors lose, their Booksellers have won,
So Pimps grow rich, while Gallants are undone.

== Births ==
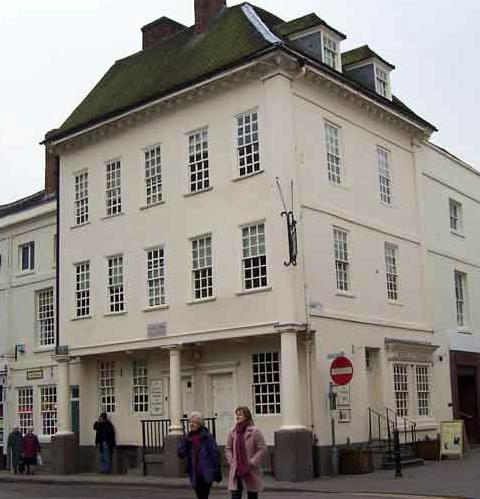
Samuel Johnson's birthplace in Market Square, Lichfield

Death years link to the corresponding "[year] in poetry" article:

- Early 1709? – John Armstrong (died 1779), Scottish poet and physician
- January 17 – George Lyttelton, 1st Baron Lyttelton (died 1773), English statesman, patron of the arts and poet
- April 15 – Christoph Friedrich Wedekind, writing as Crescentius Koromandel (died 1777), German poet
- August 7 – Jean-Jacques Lefranc, Marquis de Pompignan (died 1784), French polymathic writer
- September 18 (N.S.) – Samuel Johnson (died 1784), English author, critic, lexicographer and poet
- Also:
  - John Bancks or Banks (died 1751), English poet, bookseller and biographer
  - Robert Nugent, 1st Earl Nugent (died 1788), Irish statesman and poet
  - Laetitia Pilkington, born Laetitia van Lewen, born c. 1708 or 1709 (died 1750), Anglo-Irish poet and memoirist

== Deaths ==
Birth years link to the corresponding "[year] in poetry" article:

- February 15 – John Philips (born 1676), English
- September 4 – Jean-François Regnard (born 1655), French
- Zhu Yizun (born 1629), Chinese

== See also ==
- Poetry
- List of years in poetry
- List of years in literature

== Notes ==
- "A Timeline of English Poetry" Web page of the Representative Poetry Online Web site, University of Toronto
