= 1655 in poetry =

This article covers 1655 in poetry. Nationality words link to articles with information on the nation's poetry or literature (for instance, Irish or France).

== Works published ==
- John Cotgrave, The English Treasury of Wit and Language: collected out of the most, and best of our English drammatick poems; methodically digested into common places for generall use. By John Cotgrave, Gent (full title, but punctuation and spelling here may be different from the actual title page), contains verse drama, quotations, maxims, etc. London: Printed for Humphrey Moseley
- Sir John Denham, Coopers Hill, first authorized edition (see also Coopers Hill 1642)
- Sir Richard Fanshawe, translator, The Lusiad; or, Portugals Historicall Poem, translated from the Portuguese of Luis de Camoens
- Henry Lawes, The Second Book of Ayres, and Dialogues, for One, Two, and Three Voyces, verse and music (see also Ayres and Dialogues 1653, 1658)
- Andrew Marvell, The First Anniversary of the Government Under His Highness the Lord Protector, published anonymously, on Oliver Cromwell
- John Milton, On the Late Massacre in Piedmont
- John Phillips, A Saytr Against Hypocrites, published anonymously; an attack on Oliver Cromwell and Puritanism
- Henry Vaughan, Silex Scintillans: Sacred poems and private ejaculations, second edition (see also Silex Scintillans 1650)
- Edmund Waller, A Panegyrick to my Lord Protector, on Oliver Cromwell
- George Wither, The Protector, on Oliver Cromwell

== Births ==
Death years link to the corresponding "[year] in poetry" article:

- Jean-François Regnard (died 1709), French poet
- Lin Yining (died c. 1730), Qing dynasty Chinese poet
- Nalan Xingde (died 1685), Qing dynasty Chinese poet most famous for his ci poetry

== Deaths ==
Birth years link to the corresponding "[year] in poetry" article:

- Robert Aylett (born 1583), English lawyer and religious poet
- Cyrano de Bergerac (born 1619), French soldier and poet
- Daniel Heinsius (born 1580), scholar who wrote Latin and Dutch poetry
- Francesco Pona (born 1595), Italian doctor, philosopher, Marinist poet and writer

== See also ==
- Poetry
- 17th century in poetry
- 17th century in literature
