= Georg Stiernhielm =

Swedish civil servant, mathematician, linguist and poet

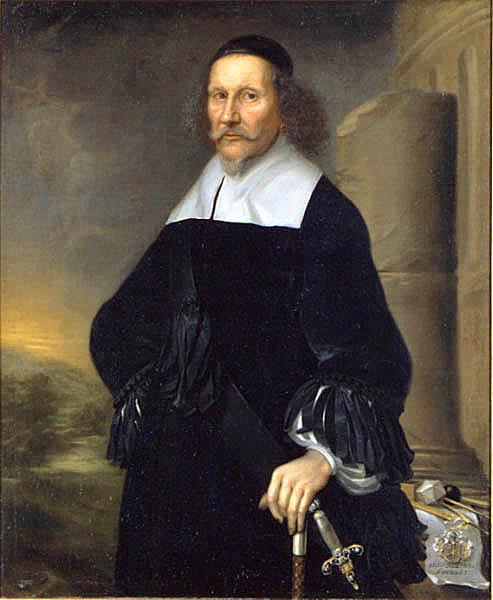
Georg Stiernhielm, painting from 1663 by David Klöcker Ehrenstrahl.

Georg Stiernhielm (August 7, 1598 – April 22, 1672) was a Swedish civil servant, mathematician, linguist and poet. He has been called "the father of the Swedish skald art".

Stiernhielm's most famous poetic work is the first poem in the Musæ Suethizantes, the Hercules composed in hexameter, with names and fables borrowed from the ancient Greeks.

== Early life and education ==
Stiernhielm was born on the family estate Gammelgården in the village Svartskär in Vika parish in Dalarna where his father, Olof Markvardsson, of the noble mining family Stierna, was a miner and bailiff. The surname Stiernhielm, literally "Star Helmet", was taken in later life when he was raised into the Swedish nobility. He grew up in the Bergslagen region where his father worked with the mining industry. Stiernhielm received his first schooling at Västerås, but he was also educated in Germany and the Netherlands.

After completing his studies in Germany, including at the University of Greifswald, he returned to Uppsala in 1624. The very following year he traveled again to Germany, as a tutor for a young Gyllenhielm, and also visited Italy, France, the Netherlands and England.

== Career ==
In 1626 he was called by Bishop Johannes Rudbeckius to be a lecturer at the high school in Västerås, and shortly afterwards he was appointed by King Gustavus Adolphus as "reading master for the Riddarhuset" in the then Collegium illustre.

In 1630 he was appointed assessor in Tartu's Court of Appeal. He was ennobled in 1631 with the name Stiernhielm and was granted Stjernlund's and Vasula's estates in Livonia. From 1639 he became a county councilor in Livonia.

In 1641 he was appointed deputy governor of Tartu in place of the ill Fabian Wrangel. On July 13, 1641, Stiernhielm met two of Wrangel's sons at a baby baptism, with whom he already had an affair. A quarrel ensued, and the heavily intoxicated Stiernhielm decided to exact revenge with sword in hand, and in the ensuing fight received a very severe cut on the right arm. He was bedridden for a long time, and suffered such permanent pain from the injury that after recovery he was forced to write with his left hand.

He was called to Stockholm in 1642 to participate in the law commission that had been appointed. He stayed several years in the capital, attracted attention for his talent and knowledge, and also gained high favor with Queen Kristina for his poems.

In 1648, he was appointed vice president of Tartu's court of appeals, but had barely taken up this position before he was recalled to Stockholm to become national antiquary. Along the way, the ship he was traveling in was wrecked; he survived but it was a completely destitute man who finally arrived in the capital. He was received with great favor by the queen. He took up the position of national archivist in 1649, and was much appreciated at court for his poems, ballets and "pranks".

However, it did not take long before he fell out of favor, when he spoke in negative terms about one of the queen's favourites. He therefore returned to Livonia, but the Russian war in 1656 forced him from there as well. With his wife and children, he thus came back to Stockholm and struggled along with great difficulty until 1658, when he was appointed by Charles X Gustav as county judge in the county of Trondheim, which had been ceded to Sweden. But when this county was lost again in 1660, Stiernhjelm was again without work, until in 1661 he was called to the council of war and the following year to a member of the Reduktionskollegium, a position he however declined.

After the establishment of the College of Antiquities, he was appointed its first governor in 1667 and as such saw his old age secured against the financial worries that followed him throughout his life. He was elected a Fellow of the Royal Society of London in December 1669.

He was married to Cecilia Burea, Johannes Bureu's niece.

== Death ==
He died in Stockholm on 22 April 1672. After his death there were disputes between the heirs. The funeral took place in June 1674. His remains were for 16 years in Klara church in Stockholm and were then taken to Sånga church. In 1799 the coffin was taken up and placed in the material shed. It was stolen from there in 1835. In 1791, the Swedish Academy awarded him a medal. On his tombstone is written "Vixit, dum vixit, laetus.", which means: "He lived happily, as long as he lived."

== Works ==
He was a pioneer of linguistics, and even if many of his conclusions later proved wrong they were accepted by his contemporaries. Stiernhielm tried to prove that Gothic, which he equated with Old Norse was the origin of all languages, and that the Nordic countries were vagina gentium, the human birthplace.

His most famous work is "Hercules", an epic poem in hexameter, about how Hercules in his youth is being tempted by Fru Lusta ("Mrs. Lust") and her daughters to choose an immoral lifestyle for his future. The allegory, known as Hercules at the crossroads, can be traced back to the Athenian sophist Prodicus of Ceos, as preserved in Xenophon.

Stiernhielm was the first Swedish poet to apply the verse meters of antique poets to the Swedish language, modifying their principle of long and short syllables to a principle of stressed and unstressed syllables, which better suits the phonology of Swedish, using ideas first developed by Martin Opitz and later theoretically applied to Swedish by Andreas Arvidi. This made him known as "the father of Swedish poetry". His Musæ Suethizantes of 1668 is held to be the first important Swedish book of poetry.
