= 1676 in poetry =

This article covers 1676 in poetry. Nationality words link to articles with information on the nation's poetry or literature (for instance, Irish or France).

== Works published ==
=== Great Britain ===
- Thomas Hobbes, translator, Homer's Iliads in English: To which may be added Homer's Odysses (Hobbes's translation of the Odyssey was published in 1675)
- Benjamin Tompson, New Englands Crisis. Or a Brief Narrative, of New-Englands Lamentable Estate at Present [...], reprinted for the most part in New-England's Tears for Her Present Miseries, also published this year; English Colonial America
- John Wilmot, Earl of Rochester:
  - A New Collection of the Choicest Songs, including "While on those lovely looks I gaze," by John Wilmot, London
  - year uncertain – Corydon and Cloris or, The Wanton Sheepherdess, a broadside, London

=== Other ===
- Isaac de Benserade, Métamorphoses d'Ovide, written in rondeaux form; received such a bad critical reception that it hurt the author's reputation, although he remained popular; France
- Peter Folger, A Looking-Glass for the Times, English Colonial America

== Births ==
Death years link to the corresponding "[year] in poetry" article:

- July 14 – Caspar Abel (died 1763), German theologian, historian and poet
- December 30 – John Philips (died 1709), English poet

== Deaths ==
Birth years link to the corresponding "[year] in poetry" article:

- March 27 – Bernardino de Rebolledo (born 1597), Spanish poet, soldier and diplomat
- May 27 – Paul Gerhardt (born 1607), German hymn writer
- July 12 – Duchess Elisabeth Sophie of Mecklenburg (born 1613), German librettist, composer, impresario and (by marriage) Duchess of Brunswick-Lüneburg
- July 27 – François Hédelin (born 1604), French abbé of Aubignac and Meymac, poet, playwright, scholar and drama theorist
- September 4 – John Ogilby (born 1600), Scottish-born translator, impresario and cartographer
- October 28 – Jean Desmarets (born 1595), French poet and playwright
- December 18 – Edward Benlowes (born 1603), English poet, patron and scholar

== See also ==
- Poetry
- 17th century in poetry
- 17th century in literature
- Restoration literature
