= 1665 in literature =

This article presents lists of the literary events and publications in 1665.

== Events ==
- January 5 – Journal des sçavans, the first scientific journal, begins publication in France.
- February 15 – Molière's comedy Dom Juan is first presented, at the Théâtre du Palais-Royal (rue Saint-Honoré) in Paris, in its original prose version with the playwright playing Sganarelle; it is withdrawn after 15 performances after attacks on its morality.
- March – Nell Gwyn, perhaps aged just 15, makes her first firmly recorded appearance on the London stage, in John Dryden's heroic drama The Indian Emperour, playing Cydaria, daughter of Montezuma and love interest to Cortez (played by her real-life lover and acting coach Charles Hart). Hitherto she has been a theatre orange-seller. Her performance is poor.
- March 6 – The Royal Society of London's Philosophical Transactions begins publication as the first scientific journal in English and the oldest to be continuously published.
- March 16 – Royalist William Cavendish is created Duke of Newcastle. His wife Margaret Cavendish becomes duchess.
- Spring – An early version of the satirical play The Rehearsal, by George Villiers, 2nd Duke of Buckingham, is prepared for production, but cancelled due to the Great Plague of London. In this version, the hero, Bilboa, mocks Sir Robert Howard. When the play is finally staged in 1672, changed conditions inspire a revision and "Bilboa" is replaced by "Bayes," a figure inspired by John Dryden.
- April 17 – Roger de Rabutin, Comte de Bussy, elected this year to the Académie française, begins a year's imprisonment in the Bastille for besmirching the reputation of ladies of the French Court in Histoire amoureuse des Gaules.
- May – Nell Gwyn appears opposite Charles Hart in James Howard's Restoration comedy All Mistaken, or the Mad Couple.
- August 27 – Ye Bare & Ye Cubbe, the first play in English in the American colonies, is performed in Pungoteague, Virginia.
- September 22 – Molière's comedy L'Amour médecin ("Love, the doctor") is first presented, before Louis XIV at the Palace of Versailles with music by Jean-Baptiste Lully.
- November 7 – The London Gazette is first published, under the title The Oxford Gazette.
- December 4 – Jean Racine's tragedy Alexandre le Grand is premièred by Molière's troupe at the Théâtre du Palais-Royal (rue Saint-Honoré) in Paris. Eleven days later, Racine moves it to the Comédiens du Roi at the Hôtel de Bourgogne, causing a rift with Molière.

== New books ==
=== Prose ===
- John Bunyan
  - The End of the World, The Resurrection of the Dead and Eternal Judgment
  - The Holy City or the New Jerusalem
- Richard Head – The English Rogue described in the life of Meriton Latroon, a witty extravagant comprehending a compleat history of the most eminent cheats of both sexes
- Robert Hooke – Micrographia

=== Drama ===
- John Crowne – Pandion and Amphigenia
- John Dryden – The Indian Emperour
- Sir Robert Howard – Four New Plays, including The Committee; Or, The Faithful Irishman
- Molière
  - Dom Juan
  - L'Amour médecin
- Roger Boyle, 1st Earl of Orrery – Mustapha
- Jean Racine – Alexandre le Grand

=== Poetry ===
- Miguel de Barrios – Flor de Apolo
- Jean de La Fontaine – Contes et nouvelles en vers
- Francisco Manuel de Melo – Obras métricas

== Births ==
- May 1 – John Woodward, English naturalist and antiquary (died 1728)
- July 2 – Samuel Penhallow English-born American historian and chief justice (died 1726)
- December 25 – Lady Grizel Baillie, Scottish songwriter (died 1746)
- unknown date – Charles Gildon, English popular biographer and translator (died 1724)
- probable – William Melmoth the Elder, English devotional writer and lawyer (died 1743)

== Deaths ==
- April 21 – Jean-Joseph Surin, French devotional writer (born 1600)
- July 11 – Sir Kenelm Digby, English courtier, diplomat and national philosopher (born 1603)
- July 28 – Louis Giry, French lawyer, translator and writer (born 1595)
- September 12 – Jean Bolland, Dutch hagiographer (born 1596)
- November/December – William Caton, English Quaker preacher and writer (born 1636)
- December – John Ellis, Welsh religious writer (born c.1598)
- December 2 – Catherine de Vivonne, marquise de Rambouillet, literary hostess (born 1589)
- unknown date – Bucherius, French Jesuit and chronological scholar (born 1576)
