= 1657 in poetry =

This article covers 1657 in poetry. Nationality words link to articles with information on the nation's poetry or literature (for instance, Irish or France).

== Works published ==
- Nicholas Billingsley, Brachy-Martyrologia
- Henry Bold, Wit a Sporting in a Pleasant Grove of New Fancies
- William Davenant, Poems on Several Occasions
- Henry King, Poems, Elegies, Paradoxes, and Sonnets, published anonymously and in an unauthorized edition
- Joshua Poole, English Parnassus, an early handbook on poetry, with a preface signed "J. D.", apparently John Dryden

== Births ==
Death years link to the corresponding "[year] in poetry" article:

- Arai Hakuseki (died 1725), Japanese poet, writer and politician
- John Norris (died 1712), English theologian, philosopher and poet
- Susanna Elizabeth Zeidler (died 1706), German poet
- Ebba Maria De la Gardie (died 1697), Swedish poet

== Deaths ==
Birth years link to the corresponding "[year] in poetry" article:

- April ? – Richard Lovelace (born 1617), English Cavalier poet
- Johann George Moeresius (born 1598), Polish poet and rector

== See also ==
- Poetry
- 17th century in poetry
- 17th century in literature
