= 1661 in poetry =

This article covers 1661 in poetry. Nationality words link to articles with information on the nation's poetry or literature (for instance, Irish or France).

== Works published ==
=== Great Britain ===
- Anonymous, An Antidote Against Melancholy, one of the most important and earliest collections of "drolleries"
- Alexander Brome, Songs and Other Poems
- John Bunyan, Profitable Meditations Fitted to Mans Different Condition, the author's first prison work and first published verse
- John Dryden, To His Sacred Majesty, a Panegyrick on his Coronation, Charles II of England was crowned April 23 this year
- John Evelyn, A Panegyric to Charles the Second
- Samuel Pordage (attributed to) - Mundorum Explicatio, or the explanation of an Hieroglyphical Figure. … Being a Sacred Poem, written by S. P., Armig.
- Edmund Waller, A Poem on St James's Park
- George Wither, The Prisoners Plea

=== Other ===
- Anders Arrebo, Hexaemeron, poem describing the six days of Creation, written c. 1622, published posthumously

== Births ==
Death years link to the corresponding "[year] in poetry" article:

- April – Anne Finch, Countess of Winchilsea, born Anne Kingsmill (died 1720), English poet
- April 16 – Charles Montagu, 1st Earl of Halifax (died 1715), English poet and statesman
- Johanna Eleonora De la Gardie (died 1708), German-born Swedish poet and noble
- Takarai Kikaku 宝井其角, also known as "Enomoto Kikaku" (died 1707), Japanese haiku poet and disciple of Matsuo Bashō
- Approximate date
  - William Cleland (died 1689), Scottish poet and soldier
  - Samuel Garth (died 1719), English physician and poet
  - John Tutchin (died 1707), English radical Whig controversialist, gadfly journalist and poet

== Deaths ==
Birth years link to the corresponding "[year] in poetry" article:

- February 12 – August Buchner (born 1591), German poet and critic
- October 2 – Barten Holyday (born 1593), English clergyman, author and poet
- December 29 – Antoine Girard de Saint-Amant (born 1594), French poet
- Approximate date
  - Antonio Enríquez Gómez (born c. 1601), Spanish dramatist, poet and novelist
  - María de Zayas (born 1590), Spanish poet and playwright

== See also ==
- Poetry
- 17th century in poetry
- 17th century in literature
- Restoration literature
