= Gow (surname) =

- Language: Scottish Gaelic

Origin
- Meaning: smith
- Region of origin: Scotland

Gow is a Scottish surname. The name is derived from the Gaelic gobha, meaning 'smith'. The name is represented in Scottish Gaelic as Gobha.

== People ==
- A. S. F. Gow (1886–1978), classical scholar
- Alan Gow (born 1982), Scottish footballer
- Alan J. Gow (born 1955), Australian motorsport executive, Director of the British Touring Car Championship
- Alexander J. Gow (fl. 2000s–2010s), Aria Award Winning Australian Songwriter (Oh Mercy)
- Andrew Gow (historian) (fl. 2000s–2020s), historian
- Andrew Carrick Gow (1848–1920), British painter
- David Gow (born 1957), Scottish inventor
- David Gow (composer) (1924–1993), English composer and teacher
- David Gow (journalist) (1945–2025), British journalist
- Elle Macpherson (born 1964), Australian model (born Eleanor Gow)
- Freddy Gow (1882–1961), Australian cricketer
- Gerry Gow (1952–2016), Scottish footballer
- Ian Gow (1937–1990), British politician assassinated by the IRA
- James Gow (disambiguation), several people
- Jennie Gow (born 1977), British broadcaster
- Joe Gow (born 1960), American academic, musician, and pornographic actor
- John Gow (c.1698–1725), Scottish pirate
- John Gow (footballer, born 1859), Scottish footballer
- John Gow (footballer, born 1869), Scottish footballer
- John Gow (1946–2024), Canadian para-alpine skier
- John Graham Gow (1850–1917), New Zealand commercial traveller and trade representative
- Leonard Gow (1859–1936), Scottish art collector and philanthropist
- Michael Gow (fl. 1980s–2010s), Australian playwright
- Michael Gow (British Army officer) (1924–2013), former Scottish soldier, commanding general and ADC to the Queen
- Nathaniel Gow (1763–1831), composer and son of Niel Gow
- Niel Gow (1727–1807), Scottish fiddler and composer
- Peter Gow (politician) (1818–1886), Canadian businessman and politician
- Peter Gow (anthropologist) (1958–2021), Scottish social anthropologist
- Phamie Gow (fl. 1990s–2020s), Scottish composer and musician
- Ronald Gow (1897–1993), English dramatist
- Stevie Gow (born 1968), Scottish footballer
- William Gow (1909–1996), Anglican priest

== See also ==
- Gow (sept)
- Gow (disambiguation)
