= Gow =

Gow, GoW, or GOW may refer to:

== Entertainment ==
=== Gaming ===
- Gears of War, a third-person shooter series developed for the Xbox 360
  - Gears of War (video game), the first game in the Gears of War series
- God of War (series), an action-adventure series for the PlayStation platforms
  - God of War (2005 video game), the first game in the series, for the PlayStation 2
  - God of War (2018 video game), the eighth game in the series, for the PlayStation 4
- Game of War: Fire Age, an iPhone-based massively multiplayer online game produced in 2013

=== Other ===
- Gangs of Wasseypur, a 2012 Indian film directed by Anurag Kashyap
- God of War (DC Comics), a limited six-issue comic book series based around the video game series (Greek mythology era)
- God of War (Dark Horse Comics), a two-volume limited comic book series with four issues each, based around the video game series (Norse mythology era)
- God of War (2010 novel), a novelization of the 2005 game
- God of War (2018 novel), a novelization of the 2018 game
- God of War (American TV series), an upcoming live-action adaptation of the two Norse-based games of the God of War series

== Places ==
- Mount Gow, Victoria Land, Antarctica
- Gowrie railway station, Melbourne, Australia
- Gow crater, Saskatchewan, Canada, an impact crater
- Gow, Iran, a village in Kerman Province, Iran
- Lesmahagow, Scotland, a town also known as "the Gow"
- Gow School, a school in South Wales, New York, U.S.
- Gopher Ordnance Works, the ruins of a World War II-era gunpowder factory near Rosemount, Minnesota, U.S.

== People ==
- Gow (surname), people with the surname
- Gow (sept), sept of the Scottish Clan MacPherson and Clan Chattan
- Gow Fields, mayor of Lakeland, Florida (2009-2014)
