= Ruthven, Scotland =

Ruthven, Scotland can refer to the following:

- Ruthven, Badenoch;
  - Ruthven Barracks, the ruin of a British government army garrison there.
- Ruthven, Aberdeenshire, near Huntly
- Aberuthven in Perth and Kinross
