= 1761 in poetry =

Nationality words link to articles with information on the nation's poetry or literature (for instance, Irish or France).

== Events ==
=== Charles Churchill terrorises the London stage ===
In March, poet Charles Churchill's Rosciad was published at his own expense, after several publishers refused it. The reckless and amusing satire described with disconcerting accuracy the faults of various actors on the London stage, and the poem immediately became popular, both for its personal character, vigour and raciness. No leading London actor, with the exception of David Garrick, had escaped censure, and in the Apology Garrick was clearly threatened. The actor deflected criticism by showing every possible civility to Churchill, who became a terror to the stage. Actor Thomas Davies, in a letter to Garrick, wrote that he blundered in the part of Cymbeline owing "to my accidentally seeing Mr. Churchill in the pit, it rendering me confused and unmindful of my business".

Churchill's satire made him many enemies, and brought reprisals. In Night, an Epistle to Robert Lloyd (also published this year), be answered the attacks made on him, offering by way of defence the argument that any faults were better than hypocrisy. Churchill received a considerable sum from sales of the poem, paid off all of his old creditors, and gave an allowance to his wife.

=== James Macpherson "finds" the work of "Ossian" ===
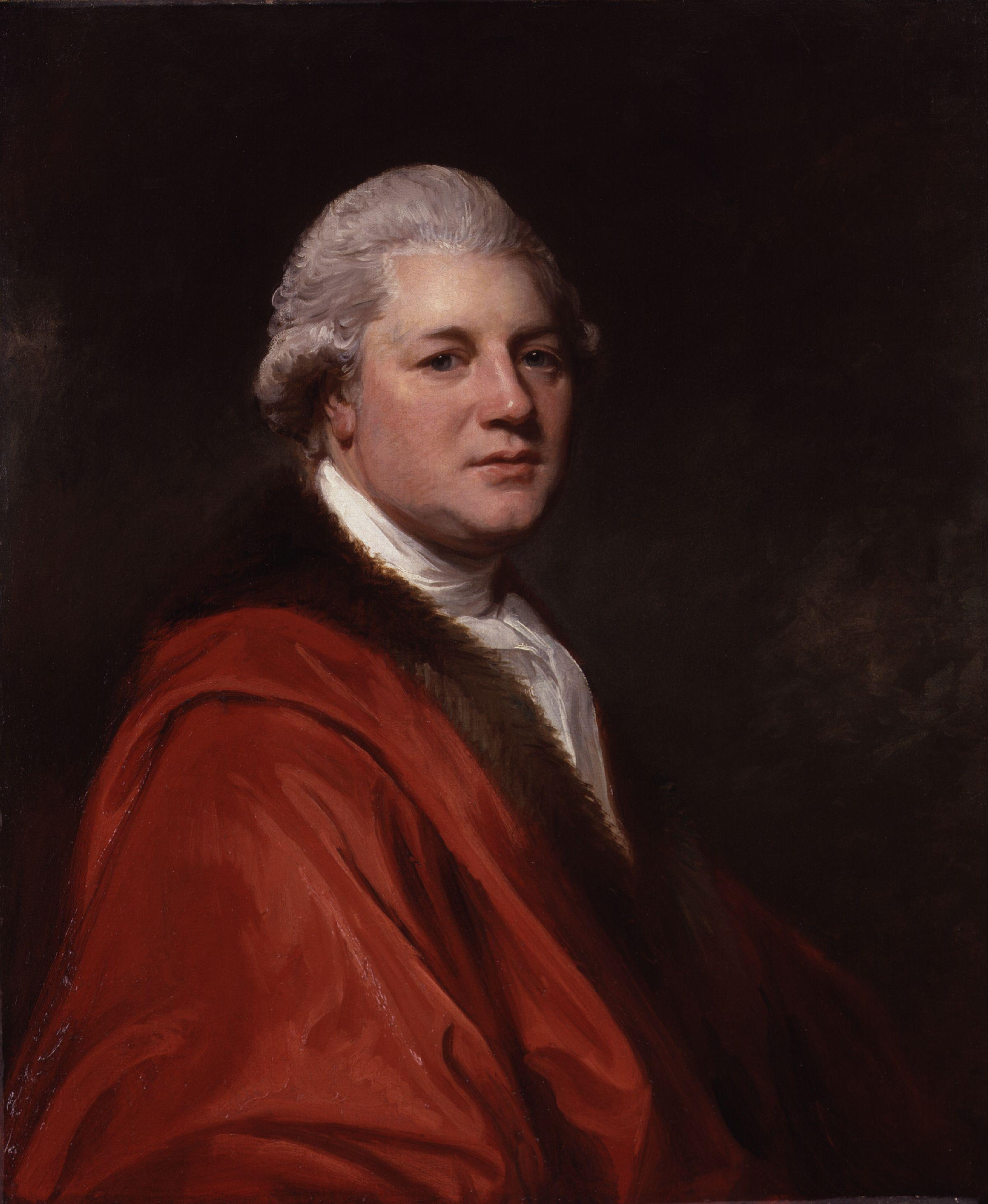
Portrait of James Macpherson by George Romney

This year James Macpherson announced the discovery of an epic on the subject of Fingal which Macpherson claimed was written by Ossian. In December he published Fingal, an Ancient Epic Poem in Six Books, together with Several Other Poems composed by Ossian, the Son of Fingal, translated from the Gaelic Language, written in the musical measured prose of which Macpherson had made use in his earlier volume. The authenticity of these so-called translations from the works of a 3rd-century bard was immediately challenged in England, and Samuel Johnson, after some local investigation, would assert (in A Journey to the Western Islands of Scotland, 1775) that Macpherson had found fragments of ancient poems and stories, then wove into a romance of his own composition. Macpherson is said to have challenged Johnson, who replied that he was not to be deterred from detecting what he thought a cheat by the menaces of a ruffian. Macpherson never produced his originals, which he refused to publish on the grounds of expense. Modern scholars tend to agree with Johnson's assessment.

== Works published ==
- John Armstrong, A Day: An epistle to John Wilkes, published anonymously, wrongly dated "1661"
- Charles Churchill:
  - The Apology (see Events, above)
  - Night: An epistle to Robert Lloyd, published anonymously
  - The Rosciad
- John Cleland, The Times!, Volume 2, a verse satire
- Samuel Davies, "An Ode on the Prospect of Peace", English, Colonial America
- Francis Fawkes, Original Poems and Translations
- Edward Jerningham, Andromache to Pyrrhus: An heroick epistle
- Robert Lloyd, An Epistle to Charles Churchill
- James Lyon, Urania, or A Choice Collection of Psalm-tunes, Anthems, and Hymns, English, Colonial America
- James Scott, Odes on Several Subjects
- Edward Thompson, The Meretriciad, a satire about Kitty Fisher, a London courtesan
- John Wilmot, Earl of Rochester, The Poetical Works Of that Witty Lord John Earl of Rochester: Left in Ranger's Lodge in Woodstock Park, where his Lordship died, and never before Printed; with Some Account of the Life of that ingenious Nobleman. Extracted from Bishop Burnet, and other Eminent Writers, London, posthumous

== Births ==
Death years link to the corresponding "[year] in poetry" article:

- April 28 – John Williams, publishing under the pen name "Anthony Pasquin" (died 1818), English satirical poet, writer and artist
- September 13 – Santō Kyōden 山東京伝, pen name of Samuru Iwase 岩瀬醒, also known popularly as "Kyōya Denzō" 京屋伝蔵 (died 1816), Japanese, Edo period poet, writer and artist; brother of Santō Kyōzan

== Deaths ==
Birth years link to the corresponding "[year] in poetry" article:

- February 4 – Samuel Davies (born 1723), English Colonial American Presbyterian clergyman, president of Princeton College, author and poet
- April 15
  - James Cawthorn (born 1719 in poetry), English poet and schoolmaster, riding accident
  - William Oldys, English antiquarian, bibliographer and poet (born 1696)

== See also ==
- Poetry
- List of years in poetry
