= Siege of Ruthven Barracks =

Siege of Ruthven Barracks may refer to:

- Siege of Ruthven Barracks (1745)
- Siege of Ruthven Barracks (1746)
