= Siege of Ruthven Barracks (1745) =

Siege of 1745

- Part of the Jacobite rising of 1745
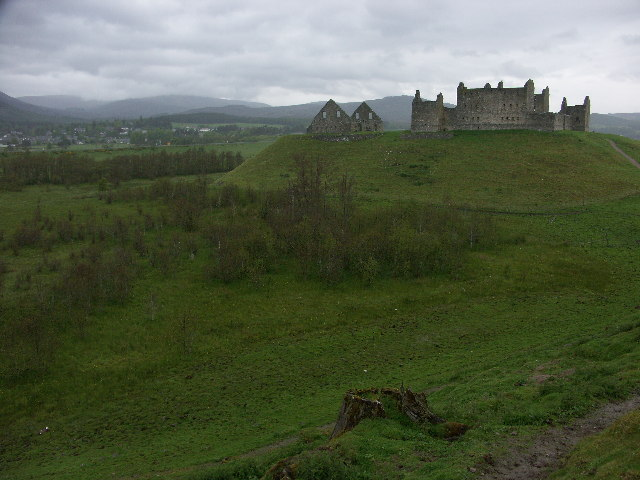
- The remains of Ruthven Barracks
Date	29 August 1745
Location	Ruthven, Scotland, Great Britain
Result	Government victory

Belligerents
Great Britain	Jacobites

Commanders and leaders
Terrance Molloy	Archibald Cameron; John O'Sullivan

Strength
15	150

Casualties and losses
1 killed	2 killed

The siege of Ruthven Barracks by Jacobite rebels of a small group of government soldiers took place in August 1745 and was part of the Jacobite rising of 1745.

== Background ==
On 29 August 1745 a force of 300 Jacobite rebels marched on the Government held Ruthven Barracks. The barracks were under the command of Sergeant Terrance Molloy who had with him only 14 private soldiers. The Jacobites came to the gate of the barracks and demanded that Molloy surrender. Molloy was defiant and refused despite the Jacobites telling him that they would hang him and his men if he refused. The Jacobites then retreated some distance.

== Assault ==
At nightfall around about 150 Jacobites returned and attacked the barracks. They set fire to the door gate but the defending soldiers managed to put it out. The man who started the fire was spotted and became an early victim. At about half past three in the morning the Jacobites withdrew. Sergeant Molloy then agreed to speak to two of the Jacobite leaders but he still refused terms of surrender. However, Molloy did agree to allow the Jacobites to remove their dead and wounded. The Jacobites had lost two men dead and several others wounded. The Government soldiers had only lost one man, who had been killed when he raised his head above the parapet, despite orders to keep his head down.

== Aftermath ==
The Jacobites then left Ruthven but not without stealing many provisions from the residents of Ruthven Village. Sergeant Molloy was immediately promoted to the rank of lieutenant. On 10 February 1746, 300 Jacobites returned to attack Ruthven Barracks again and this time they had the advantage of having brought artillery with them.
