= Siege of Ruthven Barracks (1746) =

Siege of 1746

- Part of the Jacobite rising of 1745
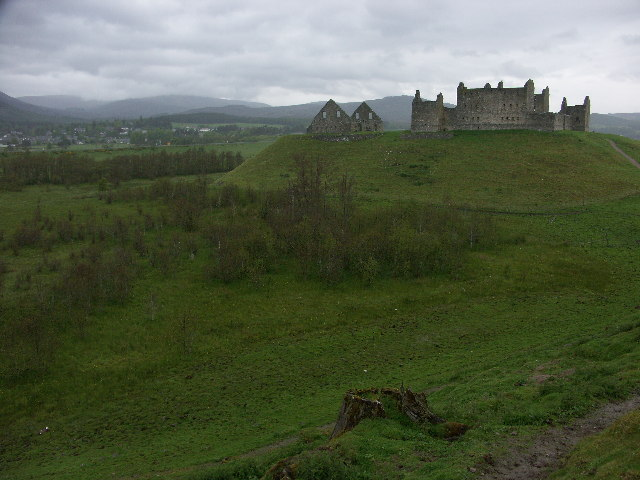
- Present-day view of Ruthven Barracks
Date	10–11 February 1746
Location	Ruthven, Scotland, Great Britain
Result	Jacobite victory

Belligerents
Jacobites	Great Britain

Commanders and leaders
John Gordon	Terrance Molloy

Strength
300	Unknown

Casualties and losses
Unknown	Unknown

The siege of Ruthven Barracks that took place over the 10 – 11 February 1746 was part of the Jacobite rising of 1745.

In August 1745 the Jacobites had unsuccessfully laid siege to the barracks being repulsed by a small group of Government soldiers. However the Jacobites returned in February 1746 this time equipped with cannon, and as a result the Government garrison surrendered. After the Government surrender the Jacobites burned Ruthven Barracks, although the damage must have been slight because they were still in use afterwards.
