= Scottish feudal barony of Kirkintilloch =

Noble title in the Baronage of Scotland

The Barony of Kirkintilloch was a feudal barony with its caput baronium originally at Kirkintilloch Castle in East Dunbartonshire, Scotland. The barony was granted to William Comyn, Baron Lenzie in 1184. After the Comyns were disinherited by King Robert the Bruce, the barony was given to the Fleming family after 1306.

1st Creation (Comyn) (1184~1300’s)

- William Comyn, 1st Baron of Kirkintilloch (1163-1233)
- John Comyn II, 2nd Baron of Kirkintilloch (1242-1302)
- William Comyn, 3rd Baron of Kirkintilloch
- John Comyn IV, 4th Baron of Kirkintilloch
- John Comyn, 5th Baron of Kirkintilloch
- John Comyn, 6th Baron of Kirkintilloch

2nd Creation (Fleming) (1341-1372)

- Sir Malcolm Fleming, 1st Earl of Wigton, 1st Baron of Kirkintilloch (d.c. 1363)
- John Fleming, 2nd Earl of Wigton, 2nd Baron of Kirkintilloch (d.x. 1382) title surrendered 1372

3rd Creation (Fleming) (1451-1606)

- Malcolm ‘Robert’ Fleming, 1st Lord Fleming, 1st Baron of Kirkintilloch (d. 1494)
- John Fleming, 2nd Lord Fleming, 2nd Baron of Kirkintilloch (d. 1524)
- John Fleming, 3rd Lord Fleming, 3rd Baron of Kirkintilloch (c. 1494-1547)
- James Fleming, 4th Lord Fleming, 4th Baron of Kirkintilloch (b. 1538-1558)
- John Fleming, 5th Lord Fleming, 5th Baron of Kirkintilloch (d. 1572)
- John Fleming, 6th or 7th Lord Fleming, 6th Baron of Kirkintilloch (1567–1619) became Earl of Wigtown in 1606

4th Creation (Fleming) (Earls of Wigtown - Peerage) (1606-Present)

- John Fleming, 1st Earl of Wigton, 1st Baron of Kirkintilloch (1567–1619)
- John Fleming, 2nd Earl of Wigtown, 2nd Baron of Kirkintilloch (1589–1650)
- John Fleming, 3rd Earl of Wigtown, 3rd Baron of Kirkintilloch (d.1665)
- John Fleming, 4th Earl of Wigtown, 4th Baron of Kirkintilloch (d.1668)
- William Fleming, 5th Earl of Wigtown, 5th Baron of Kirkintilloch (d.1681)
- John Fleming, 6th Earl of Wigtown, 6th Baron of Kirkintilloch (1673–1744)
- Charles Fleming, 7th Earl of Wigtown, 7th Baron of Kirkintilloch (1675–1747)
