= List of listed buildings in King Edward, Aberdeenshire =

This is a list of listed buildings in the parish of King Edward in Aberdeenshire, Scotland.

== List ==
Name	Location	Date listed	Grid ref. (Note: Sometimes known as OSGB36, the grid reference (where provided) is based on the British national grid reference system used by the Ordnance Survey. • "Guide to National Grid". Ordnance Survey. • "Get-a-map". Ordnance Survey.)	Geo-coordinates	Notes	LB number (Note: Historic Environment Scotland assign a unique alphanumeric identifier to each designated site in Scotland, for listed buildings this always begins with "LB", for example "LB12345".)	Image
King Edward, Old Parish Church, Walled Burial Ground And Gateway				57°36′32″N 2°29′18″W	Category B	9391	Upload Photo
Craigston Castle, Bridge Over Craigston Burn				57°35′03″N 2°24′06″W	Category B	9395	Upload Photo
Eden Castle				57°37′05″N 2°30′26″W	Category B	9399	Upload Photo
Eden House, Walled Garden And Glasshouses				57°37′36″N 2°30′17″W	Category B	9402	Upload Photo
Eden, Home Farm Steading				57°37′34″N 2°30′03″W	Category C(S)	9409	Upload Photo
King Edward Parish Church, Walls And War Memorial				57°36′38″N 2°28′39″W	Category B	13612	Upload Photo
New Bythe Church Of Scotland				57°34′28″N 2°18′00″W	Category C(S)	13615	Upload Photo
Strocherie Farmhouse				57°35′35″N 2°27′06″W	Category B	13617	Upload Photo
Castleton Old Bridge Over Burn Of King Edward				57°35′41″N 2°27′56″W	Category C(S)	13474	Upload Photo
Moreless Farmhouse				57°36′10″N 2°23′59″W	Category C(S)	13614	Upload Photo
New Bythe, 11, 13 Bridge Street				57°34′25″N 2°17′54″W	Category C(S)	13616	Upload Photo
Balchers Farmhouse				57°36′42″N 2°28′45″W	Category B	13471	Upload Photo
Castleton New Bridge Over Burn Of King Edward				57°35′39″N 2°27′58″W	Category C(S)	13473	Upload Photo
Craigston Castle				57°35′05″N 2°23′58″W	Category A	9392	Upload Photo
Craigston Castle, Bridge Over Craigston Burn (Immediately South Of Castle)				57°35′03″N 2°23′58″W	Category C(S)	9396	Upload Photo
Danshillock, Old School				57°36′25″N 2°28′30″W	Category C(S)	9398	Upload Photo
Craigston Mill				57°35′19″N 2°23′00″W	Category B	9397	Upload Photo
Eden, North Lodge				57°37′46″N 2°29′55″W	Category C(S)	9405	Upload Photo
Eden, Home Farm, Dovecote / Poultry House				57°37′33″N 2°30′03″W	Category B	9408	Upload Photo
Mill Of King Edward, Bridge Over Burn Of King Edward				57°35′35″N 2°27′30″W	Category C(S)	13613	Upload Photo
Eden, Home Farm, Former Mill				57°37′31″N 2°30′03″W	Category C(S)	9388	Upload Photo
Eden House				57°37′43″N 2°30′22″W	Category B	9401	Upload Photo
Eden, Bell Cottage				57°37′39″N 2°30′17″W	Category C(S)	9403	Upload Photo
Eden, South Lodge				57°37′18″N 2°30′16″W	Category B	9406	Upload Photo
Eden, Home Farm Farmhouse				57°37′34″N 2°30′04″W	Category C(S)	9407	Upload Photo
Glencairn, With Rear Service Cottage, Garden Walls And Gates And Gatepiers				57°36′33″N 2°29′20″W	Category C(S)	9389	Upload Photo
Craigston Castle, Home Farm				57°35′06″N 2°24′06″W	Category B	9394	Upload Photo
Craigston Castle, Dovecote				57°35′04″N 2°24′05″W	Category B	9393	Upload Photo
Eden, Bridge Of Eden				57°36′36″N 2°30′42″W	Category B	9400	Upload Photo
Eden, The Coach House				57°37′37″N 2°30′18″W	Category B	9404	Upload Photo
Bythe House Dovecote				57°35′56″N 2°18′26″W	Category C(S)	13472	Upload Photo
Glencairn, Steading				57°36′33″N 2°29′17″W	Category C(S)	9390	Upload Photo

== Key ==
The scheme for classifying buildings in Scotland is:

- Category A: "buildings of national or international importance, either architectural or historic; or fine, little-altered examples of some particular period, style or building type."
- Category B: "buildings of regional or more than local importance; or major examples of some particular period, style or building type, which may have been altered."
- Category C: "buildings of local importance; lesser examples of any period, style, or building type, as originally constructed or moderately altered; and simple traditional buildings which group well with other listed buildings."

In March 2016 there were 47,288 listed buildings in Scotland. Of these, 8% were Category A, and 50% were Category B, with the remaining 42% being Category C.

== See also ==
- List of listed buildings in Aberdeenshire
