= Banff Castle =

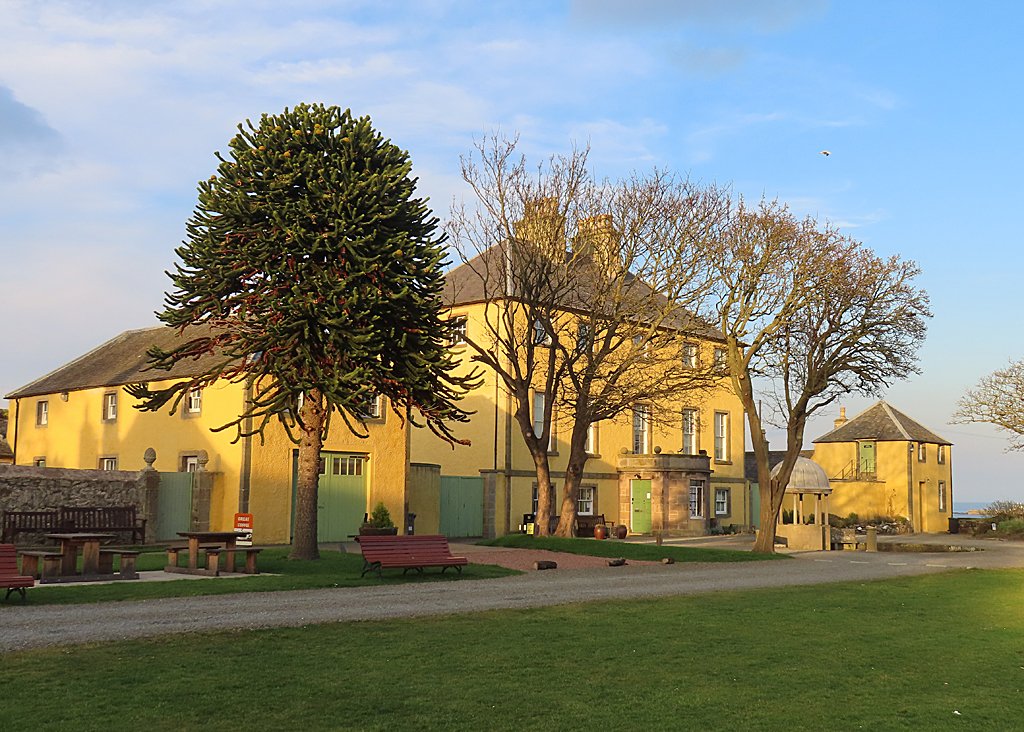
- Banff Castle in 2025
- Interactive map of the Banff Castle area

General information
- Location: Aberdeenshire, Banff, Scotland
- Coordinates: 57.6666°N 2.5224°W
- Completed: 12th century

Scheduled monument
- Official name: Banff Castle
- Type: Secular: castle
- Designated: 2 October 1970
- Reference no.: SM2927

Banff Castle is a ruined former royal castle near Banff, Aberdeenshire, Scotland.

== History ==
Built as a motte and bailey castle in the 12th century and held by the Comyns, Earl of Buchan. The castle was visited by King Edward I of England in 1296 and also in 1298, after defeating William Wallace at the Battle of Falkirk during the Wars of Scottish Independence. The castle was garrisoned with English troops until being captured by the Scots in 1310. It came into the possession of the Sharps, before being sold to Lord Ogilvy of Deskford in 1722. The castle then passed into the hands of the Russells.

The old castle was demolished and a mansion house designed by architect John Adam was built in 1750. The remains of the old castle are a scheduled monument.

== Current house ==
The current house is a Category A listed building. It serves as a community and arts venue for the town of Banff and the surrounding areas.
