= Gow (sept) =

The surname Gow is a sept of the Clan Macpherson, a Highland Scottish clan. The Clan Macpherson are in turn a member of the confederation of the Clan Chattan. Within the clan the surname Smith is considered synonymous with that of Gow and this is due to the family's progenitor being either of the surname Smith or of having been of the occupation of Blacksmith. They are known in Scottish Gaelic as the Sliochd an Gobh Cruim which means "the race of the crooked smith".

== Origins and the Battle of the North Inch ==
In 1396, the Battle of the North Inch took place in Perth, Scotland and was fought as a trial by combat in front of Robert III of Scotland. On one side were the confederation of Clan Chattan and on the other side was the Clan Cameron. Thirty warriors were selected to represent each side, but one of the Chattan men fell sick prior to the commencement of the battle and it was therefore proposed that the Camerons should lose one man to keep the numbers even on each side. However, a local man from Perth named either Henry Wynd or Henry Smith who was either a smith or armourer, by trade volunteered to take the sick man's place on the condition that he would be paid a fee if he survived. According to John Scott Keltie, Henry was known as Gow Crom which is Scottish Gaelic for "Crooked Smith". Only one man of the Clan Cameron and eleven men of the Clan Chattan survived the battle, including Henry Wynd or Smith. Historian Charles Fraser-Mackintosh stated that Henry, who was a swordsman, had contributed greatly to the success of his side during the battle. Keltie stated that Henry was the only one of the survivors on the Chattan side who was not wounded and that by his excellence as a swordsman had mainly contributed to gain the day. After the battle Henry Smith was invited north, and adopted into the Clan Chattan where he became the progenitor of the family known in Scottish Gaelic as Sliochd an Gobh Cruim which means "the race of the crooked smith", according to Alexander Mackintosh-Shaw. According to Charles Fraser-Mackintosh, they are known as Sliochd a Ghobha Chrom and that Henry had twelve followers who to keep in his favor learned to make swords and how to use them. They spread out over the country and in time took the surname of Mackintosh who was their chief. Fraser-Mackintosh states that the Gows took protection of Mackintosh (who was the chief of Clan Chattan) in 1399. However, the modern publication Scots Kith & Kin (2014) states that the Gows were a sept of the Clan Macpherson who are also part of the Clan Chattan.

The Clans, Septs, and Regiments of the Scottish Highlands states under the heading CLAN MACPHERSON SEPTS that "(4) Gow, MacGowan. - Gow in Gaelic signifies Smith. The Gows of Clan Chattan are said to be descendants of Henry of the Wynd, the bandy-legged smith of Perth, who fought at the celebrated battle of the North Inch of Perth. This branch of the Clan Chattan has long been known as Sliochd a' Ghobha Chrom (the race of the bandy-legged smith). It is possible that a number of families rejoicing in this well-known name of Smith may be descendants of Henry Gow." Referencing the battle from the same book, Adam's wrote: "During 1396 occurred the celebrated combat on the North Inch of Perth, where, in order to settle a question of dispute, the exact nature of which has not been preserved, before King Robert III and his Court, thirty representatives of the Clan Chattan encountered an equal number of the "Clan Kay" (the precise identity of the contestants is, however, uncertain). In this contest, the Clan Chattan were the victors, not, however, before they had lost nineteen of their number. Of the Clan Kay, twenty-nine bit the dust. The remaining man escaped by swimming across the Tay. In the Clan Chattan it was handed down that this contest was between the Davidsons, as "eldest cadet" of Clan Chattan, and the Macphersons, as "heir-male," obviously for the honour of "principal cadet" under the heir-of-line chief, The Mackintosh, and the aftermath of their quarrel at the Battle of Invernahavon. That the Macphersons won the positions of a place at the right of Mackintosh and Ceann Cath within Clan Chattan (the normal right of the "principal cadet") can only suggest the unpredictable result of trial by combat (App. XXIX).

== Initial Residence Within Clan Chattan ==
"The happy connection betwixt Henry Smith, and the Clan Chattan, was not destined to terminate with the fight. Henry was invited to the north, and to unite with the clan for the future, -- and it is recorded that 'Henry of the Wynd set out from Perth, with a horse load of his effects, and said he would not take up his residence or habitation until his load fell, which happened in Strath Avon in Banffshire, where he accordingly settled...'"

Strath Avon is located south-east of Kirkmichael, within the current council area of Moray, and is accessible via the Glenlivet bicycle trail system. Several ruins remain at Strath Avon, one being called Blackhaugh; another is an archeological site.

== Y-DNA Evidence in Support of the Historical Narrative ==
Although Smith is the most common surname in Scotland, any male Smith will need to have their Y-DNA tested to learn whether or not their ancestry is associated with Clans Macpherson or Chattan. For example, Ian Ronald Smythe (Smythe ancestrally spelled Smith) had his Big Y-700 test completed in June, 2021 via FamilyTreeDNA. The test revealed multiple matches to others named Macpherson, including the late Chief of Clan Macpherson.

== Later Gows ==
The name Thomas Gow is found in 1589 in a bond signed at Dunkeld between Mackintosh and MacDonald of Keppoch. James Gow is recorded as a tenant under Mackintosh in 1635 in Badenoch. The names William Gow and Ewen Gow are noted in Crathiecoy and Laggan, Badenoch in 1679. During the Jacobite rising of 1745 the name Alexander Gow in Ruthven, Badenoch is found in the Jacobite army. Niel Gow (1727–1807) may have been of the Clan Chattan.

The Clans, Septs, and Highland Regiments of the Scottish Highlands states: "...The Highlands were famed for their manufactures, smiths, and jewellers. These rural craftsmen were, of course, usually hereditary, son or son-in-law succeeding father, and each generation accumulating further skill and pride in their vocation...the son became as proud of his calling as of his name."

George Smith (1793-1871) became the first distiller in the Highlands to obtain a license for distillation and, in 1824, he established The Glenlivet distillery after the 1823 Excise Act at Upper Drumin, Strathavon, Banffshire.

Donald Alexander Smith, 1st Baron Strathcona and Mount Royal whose father, John, lived as a crofter at Knockando, Moray. John Smith's daughter, Elspet, married Donald's business partner, George Stephen, 1st Baron Mount Stephen who was born in Dufftown, Banffshire.

== See also ==
- Gow (surname)

== In Literature ==
The Fair Maid of Perth
