= Castle Roy =

Castle in Highland, Scotland

- Caisteal Ruadh (Red Castle)
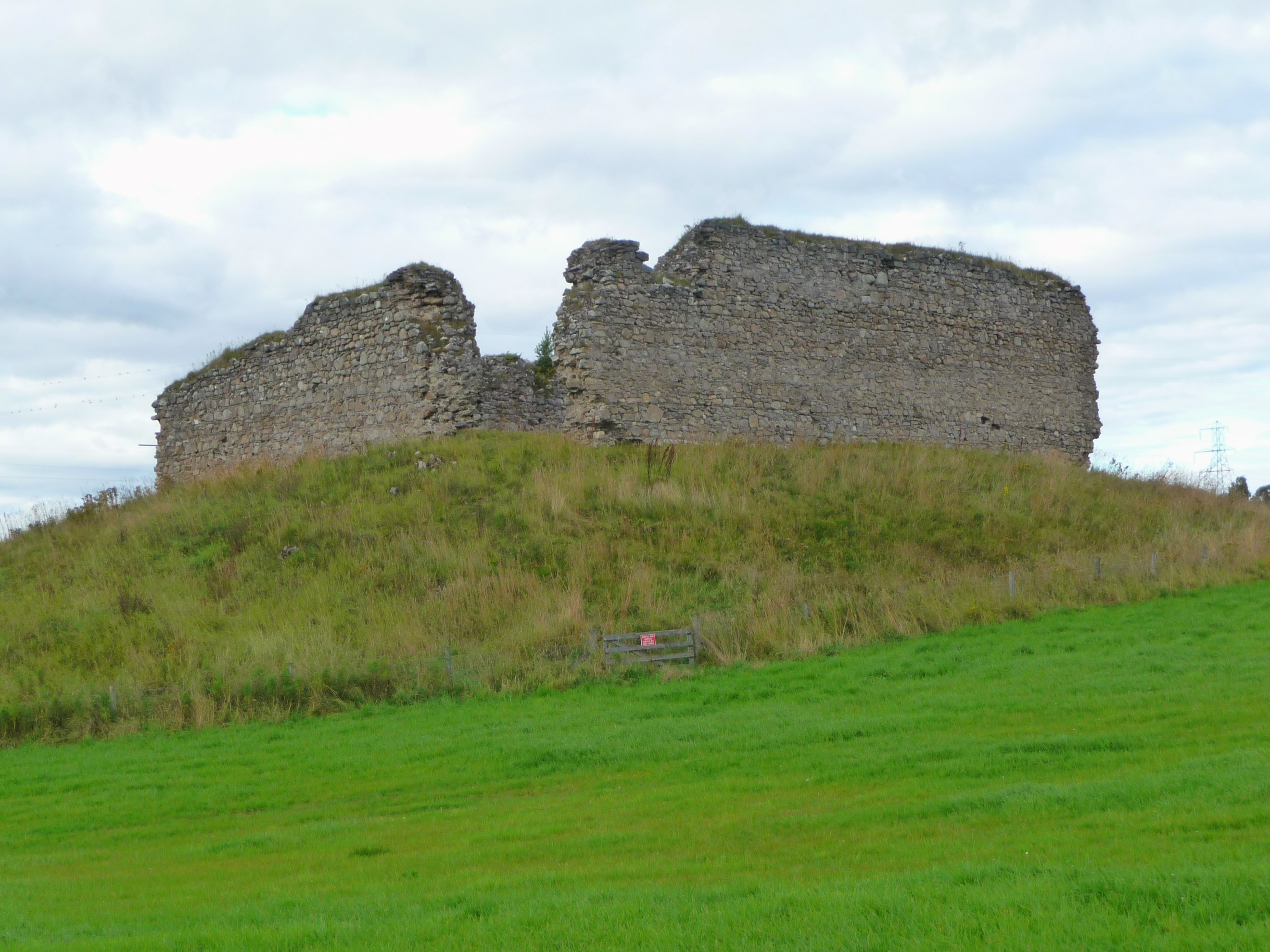
- Ruins of Castle Roy

Location
- Coordinates: 57°16′37″N 3°38′57″W

Site history
- Built: 13th century

Castle Roy is a ruined courtyard castle dating from the thirteenth century, situated just north of Nethy Bridge near Grantown-on-Spey, Scotland. It is a scheduled monument. The castle is associated with the Comyn family.
