= Kirkintilloch Castle =

- Kirkintilloch, East Dunbartonshire, Scotland

Site information
- Condition: Earthworks only

Location
- Shown within Scotland
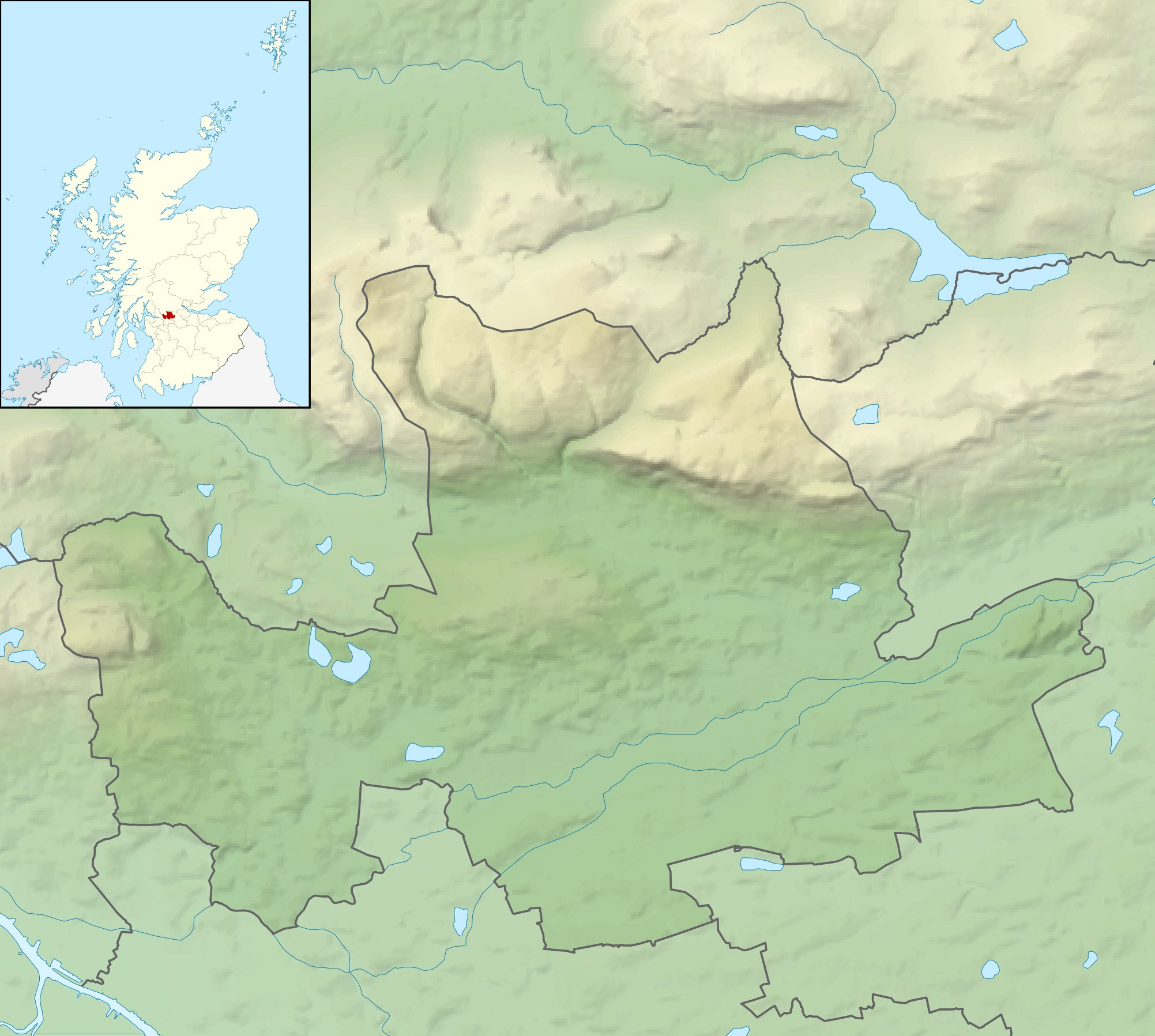
- Location within East Dunbartonshire
- Coordinates: 55.940°N 4.161°W

Kirkintilloch Castle was located in Kirkintilloch, East Dunbartonshire, Scotland.

A castle for the Scottish feudal barony of Kirkintilloch was built in the 12th century, by the Comyn family. Kirkintilloch was granted burgh status in 1211. During the Scottish wars of independence an English garrison was stationed there, commanded by Sir Philip de Moubray. The garrison was dispatched to arrest William Wallace at Robroyston in 1305 and escorted him to Dumbarton Castle. Also in 1305, the garrison is recorded as having sent a petition to King Edward I of England complaining of non-payment of wages. Bishop Robert Wishart laid siege to the castle in 1306, but the siege was not successful. During 1307, King Robert the Bruce granted Kirkintilloch to Malcolm Fleming, but the castle appears to have been destroyed and abandoned. The Flemings chose not to rebuild the castle, instead basing themselves at Cumbernauld Castle. It is recorded that stone ramparts survived into the 18th century, before the stone was quarried for reuse.

Traces of a motte (mound) can still be seen in Peel Park in the town. The motte is rectangular, measuring 30 by 17 metres (98 by 56 ft), with a ditch to its south and east sides. The castle was constructed on the line of the Roman Antonine Wall, adjacent to a fort. Peel Park is designated as a scheduled monument of national importance for this collection of historic features.
