= Dalswinton Castle =

Castle in Scotland

Coordinates: 55.1397°N 3.6596°W

Dalswinton Castle, also known as Comyn's Castle, was a castle that was located to the south-east of Dalswinton, in Dumfries and Galloway, Scotland.

A castle was recorded at the site in 1250 and was owned by the Comyns of Badenoch. After it was captured by the English in 1301, the castle constable was John de Botetourt. During Edward Bruce's campaign in Galloway in 1308–1309, the castle was still in English hands. Dalswinton surrendered to Scottish forces in early 1313. The castle was abandoned after the construction of the House of Dalswinton in the 17th century. The remains of the castle appear to have been demolished after 1792.

== Sources ==
- Barron, Evan Macleod (1914). The Scottish war of independence; a critical study by Evan Macleod Barron. J. Nisbet.
