= The Dell, Kingussie =

Sports venue in Kingussie, Highland, Scotland

The Dell
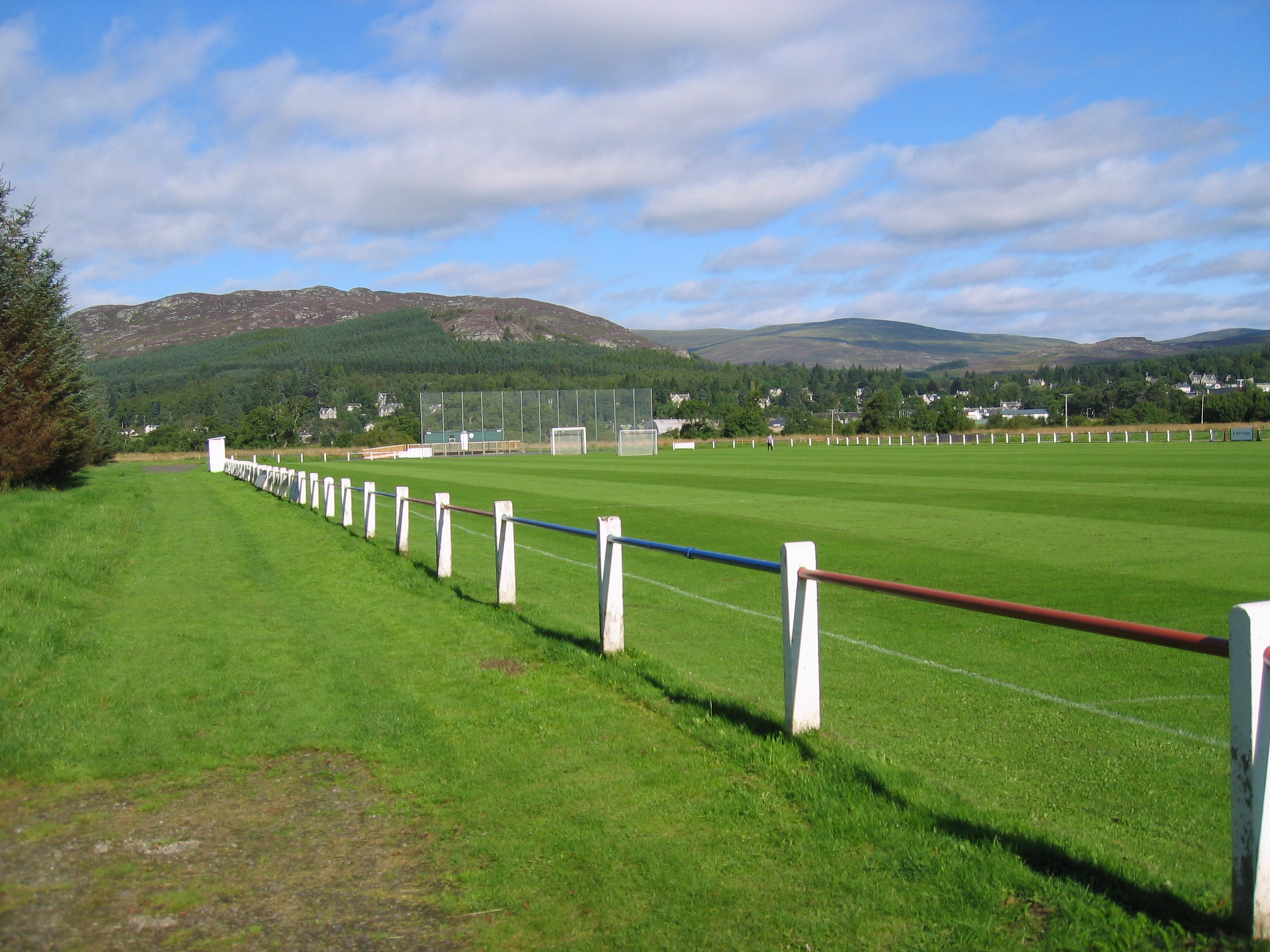
- The Dell in 2012
- Interactive map of The Dell
- Location: Kingussie, Highland, Scotland
- Coordinates: 57.072°N 4.051°W
- Owner: Kingussie Camanachd

Tenant
- Kingussie Camanachd (1880s–present)

The Dell is a shinty venue in the town of Kingussie, Scotland. It is the home of Kingussie Camanachd and has been used for shinty for more than 150 years.

== Location ==
The ground is beside the River Spey about 1/2 mile (0.80 km) south of the centre of Kingussie. The B970 runs close to the ground, crossing the river at Ruthven bridge. The A9 main road runs to the south of the river, passing close to the ground as it bypasses Kingussie and neighbouring Newtonmore.

== History ==
The first shinty match recorded as being played at the Dell was on 30 January 1866. It has hosted a number of Camanachd Cup finals, the most recent in 2022.

The park was owned by Dochfour Estates, until Kingussie Camanachd purchased the ground in 2010. The transfer of ownership was marked with a ceremony. This has allowed the club to make improvements to what was already one of the best playing surfaces in shinty. The stadium was one of the first in shinty to have crowd control barriers in place and the club has constructed a stand which was flood proofed in 2017 to allow the holding of the Camanachd Cup final in Kingussie again. The 2020 final was to have been held at the Dell but all shinty competitions that season were cancelled due to the COVID-19 pandemic. The 2022 final is the most recent Camabachd Cup final to have been played at Kingussie.
