= 1696 in poetry =

Nationality words link to articles with information on the nation's poetry or literature (for instance, Irish or France).

== Events ==
- Tuscan poet Vincenzo da Filicaja becomes governor of Volterra.

== Works ==
- Aphra Behn - The Unfortunate Happy Lady
- John Wilmot, Earl of Rochester, Poems, (&c.) On Several Occasions: with Valentinian; a Tragedy, London: Printed by Jacob Tonson, posthumously published

== Births ==
Death years link to the corresponding "[year] in poetry" article:

- July 14 – William Oldys (died 1761), English antiquary, bibliographer and poet
- Matthew Green (died 1737), English writer of light verse and customs official

== Deaths ==
Birth years link to the corresponding "[year] in poetry" article:

- January 3 – Mary Mollineux (born c.1651), English poet
- August 9 – Wacław Potocki (born 1621), Polish nobleman (Szlachta), moralist, poet and writer
- September 8 – Henry Birkhead (born 1617), English academic, lawyer, Latin poet and founder of the Oxford Chair of Poetry
- November 26 – Gregório de Matos (born 1636), Brazilian Baroque poet

== See also ==
- List of years in poetry
- List of years in literature
- 17th century in poetry
- 17th century in literature
- Poetry
