= Clan Macpherson =

Highland Scottish clan

Clan MacPherson
- Clann Mac a' Phearsain
- Motto: "Touch not the cat but a glove." — current "Touch not the cat bot a glove." — archaic

Profile
- Region: Highlands
- District: Badenoch
- Plant badge: White Heather

Chief
- James Brodie Macpherson of Cluny, 7th of Blairgowrie
- 28th Hereditary Chief of Clan Macpherson
- Seat: Newton Castle
- Historic seat: Cluny Castle
Septs of Clan MacPherson
Archibald, Cattanach, Clark, Clarke, Clarkson, Clerk, Clunie, Cluny, Currie, Ellis, Ellison, Fersen, Gillespie, Gillie, Gillies, Goudie, Gow, Gowan, Gowans, Leary, Lees, MacChlery, MacClair, MacCleary, MacCleish, MacCurrach, MacCurrie, MacGillies, MacGoun, MacGow, MacGowan, MacKeith, MacLear, MacLeary, MacLees, MacLeish, MacLerie, MacLise, MacLish, MacMurdo, MacMurdoch, MacMurich, MacVurich, MacVurrich, Murdoch, Murdoson, Pearson, Smith.
Allied clans
- Chattan Confederation
- Clan Mackintosh
- Clan MacPhail
- Clan MacBean
- Clan Shaw of Tordarroch
- Clan Farquharson
- Clan MacThomas
- Clan MacGillivray
- Clan Davidson
- Clan MacQueen
- MacIntyres of Badenoch
- the Macleans of Dochgarroch
Rival clans
- Clan Cameron
- Clan Comyn
- Clan MacColl

Clan Macpherson (/məkˈfɜːrsən/ mək-FUR-sən, locally [makˈfɛrsən]) is a Scottish clan from the Highlands and a member of the Chattan Confederation.

== History ==
=== Origins ===
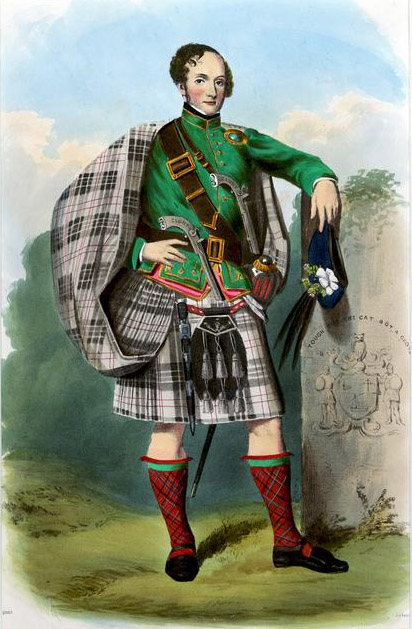
A romantic depiction of a clansman illustrated by R. R. McIan, from James Logan's The Clans of the Scottish Highlands, 1845

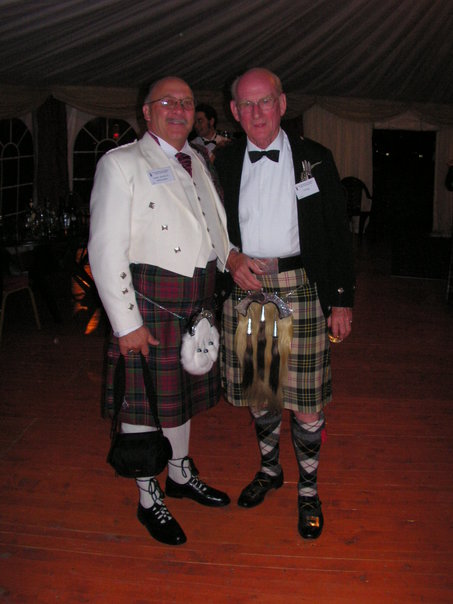
The late chief Sir William Macpherson (right) and a clansman wearing two different Macpherson tartans

The Scottish Gaelic surname for Macpherson is Mac a' Phearsain which means son of the parson. The Celtic church allowed priests to marry and the progenitor of the chiefs of Clan Macpherson is believed to have been a man named Muireach or Murdo Cattenach who was the priest of Kingussie in Badenoch.

The Clan Macpherson is part of the Chattan Confederation (Clan Chattan). In 843 the chief of Clan Chattan was Gille Chattan Mor and one of his descendants, the first chief of Clan Macpherson was forced to resettle in Lochaber by Kenneth MacAlpin, first king of Scots. The chief could have been the lay prior of Ardchattan and he seems to have been named in honour of Saint Cathan.

Macpherson clan traditions is that in 1309 Robert the Bruce offered the lands of Badenoch to the chief of Clan Macpherson if they destroyed the Bruce's enemies, the Clan Comyn, and the Macphersons carried out the king's wishes. The Clan Macpherson is sometimes known as the Clan of the Three Brothers as chief Ewan Ban Macpherson had three sons: Kenneth Macpherson of Clunie, Iain Macpherson of Pitman and Gillies Macpherson of Invereshie.

=== 14th-century clan conflicts ===
In 1370 the Battle of Invernahavon took place between the Chattan Confederation and the Clan Cameron. There was a dispute between the Macphersons and another clan of the confederation, the Clan Davidson over who should take the right wing in the battle. The Clan Mackintosh, whose chiefs were also chiefs of the Chattan Confederation favoured the Davidsons and as a result the Macphersons left the field of battle. The Clan Cameron took advantage of this situation and gained the upper hand, however the Macphersons were eventually coerced back into the battle and the Camerons were defeated. The feud between the Clan Cameron and Chattan Confederation continued for many years after and in 1396 the Battle of the North Inch took place, which was watched by Robert III of Scotland and his whole court.

==== The Black Chanter ====
According to Clan Macpherson lore, at the end of the battle, a piper appeared in the sky, played a few notes and then let the pipes fall to the ground, where, being made of crystal they broke; all except the chanter, which, being of wood only cracked. The Clan Chattan piper then seized the chanter and began playing. This Black Chanter is kept at the Clan Macpherson Museum in Newtonmore.

=== 16th century and Glenlivet ===
Prior to the Battle of Glenlivet in 1594 which was fought between Protestant forces under the Earl of Argyll and Catholic forces under the Earl of Huntly, Argyll had laid siege to Ruthven Castle which was well defended by the Clan Macpherson who were vassals of Huntly's and so Argyll had to give up the siege.

=== 17th century and civil war ===
In 1618 Andrew Macpherson, eighth chief of Clan Macpherson acquired the abbey-castle grange in Strathisla. Andrew's son, Euan Macpherson supported the royalist cause during the Scottish Civil War and fought for James Graham, 1st Marquess of Montrose. The tenth chief was Duncan Macpherson of Cluny who in 1672 lost his claim to lead the Chattan Confederation. The Privy Council of Scotland instead found in favour of a Mackintosh. Duncan had no sons and in 1722 was therefore succeeded as chief of Clan Macpherson by Lachlan Macpherson, fourth Laird of Nuid.

=== 18th century Jacobite risings ===
Clan Macpherson having supported the Jacobite rising of 1715, General Wade's report on the Highlands in 1724, estimated the clan strength at 220 men. Chief Euan Macpherson of Cluny was a notable leader in the Jacobite rising of 1745 and fought at the Clifton Moor Skirmish. 300 Macphersons took part in the Atholl raids of March 1746. After the Jacobite defeat at the Battle of Culloden, Cluny was able to escape capture by government troops for nine years even though a reward of £1000 was offered for his capture. He escaped to France in 1755. William Macpherson, who was killed at the Battle of Falkirk (1746), is the ancestor of the current Chief of Clan Macpherson. His brother witnessed government "red coats" burning Macpherson of Cluny's house. Duncan Macpherson of Cluny (1748 - 1817) fought in the British Army during the American Revolutionary War.

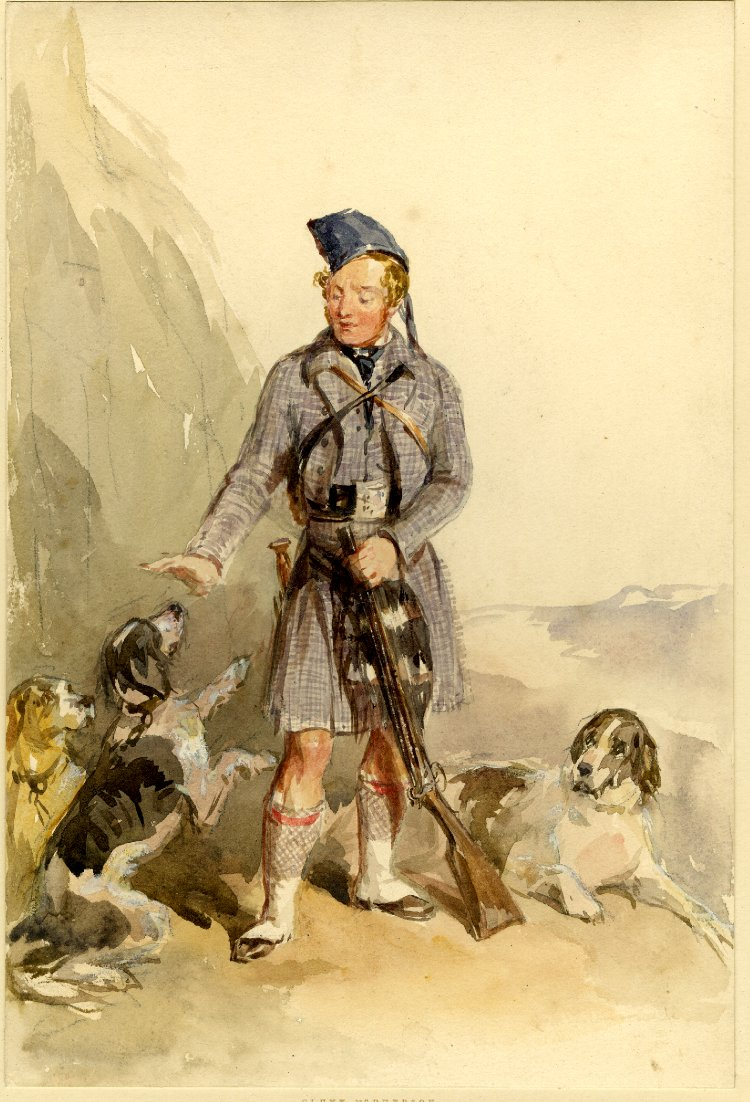
Portrait of Cluny MacPherson, circa 1873

=== 19th century estate management ===
In the early 19th century, Colonel Duncan Macpherson converted his farms in Badenoch into sheep walks (five in Laggan and two in Kingussie), greatly increasing their rental value, while substantial increases in the rents on his multi-tenant farms such as Lag and Drumgask further drove depopulation, bringing clan-based land management to an end. Duncan Macpherson's relationships with his tenants were often acrimonious. In 1812, he was obliged to admit having slandered John Macpherson, the tacksman and improving farmer at Cluny Mains, while 'heated with liquor' at a regimental dinner in Inverness. In 1816, his attempt to remove his nephew, Colonel Barclay Macpherson, and all his subtenants from Catlag was successfully contested in the courts.

Rev. John Anderson, who was the Duke of Gordon's estate manager from 1809 to 1838, married into Clan Macpherson and sought to support and retain old clan tacksman families in times of hardship. When the Duke's Badenoch lands were put on the market in 1829, he favoured Clan Macpherson buyers.

In 1817 Colonel Duncan was succeeded as clan chief by his son Ewen Macpherson (Old Cluny) (1804 - 1885), who derived an increasing proportion of his income from shooting tenancies. In 1832, Ewen married into the Davidsons of Tulloch, a wealthy Caribbean slave-owning family, the £33,000 his wife brought to the marriage contributing to improvements to the castle and estate. Many members of Clan Macpherson were involved in Jamaica's slave economy, and a proportion of the wealth they accrued, including the compensation which followed slave emancipation, flowed back to Badenoch. In 1836, Old Cluny converted his lands of Benalder and Gallovie (Ardverikie) into one large deer forest for James Hamilton, Marquis of Abercorn. In 1850, he secured Government funding under the Drainage Act to construct stronger floodbanks on the Spey in the vicinity of Cluny Castle in order the bring 300 acres of land into arable cultivation.

== Castles and other buildings ==
- Cluny Castle, about five miles south-west of Newtonmore in Strathspey, was a stronghold of the clan. The original fourteenth-century castle was razed by the Duke of Cumberland after the Jacobite rising of 1745 which the Macphersons had supported. The present Cluny Castle is a nineteenth-century mansion that was built on the site of the original stronghold.
- Ballindalloch Castle was built by the Clan Grant and owned by the Ballindallochs before coming to the Macphersons, now the Macpherson-Grants.
- Newton Castle, Blairgowrie, Perthshire, is the current seat of the Macpherson chiefs.
- Invereshie House, near Kingussie, Strathspey, was held by the Macphersons from the fourteenth century. William Macpherson of Invereshie captured Blair Castle from the Marquess of Montrose in 1644.
- Pitmain House, near Kingussie, Strathspey, was held by the Macphersons from the fourteenth century. The present building formed part of the Highland Folk Museum until its closure at that site in 2007. Pitmain Lodge was then sold to private owners in 2020.
- Glentruim House, near the village Laggan, was the seat of the Macphersons of Glentruim. Built by Major Ewan Macpherson of Glentruim and Ralia the 1830s. It was built on purchased land from the Duke of Gordon’s estate.
- Clan Macpherson House and Museum, Newtonmore, is situated at the junction of Perth Road, Laggan Road and Main Street. The museum opened in 1952, with the exhibition mainly containing items from the nearby Cluny Castle which had recently been sold. The displays in the museum were significantly reworked in 1984–1985 and in winter 2004–2005.

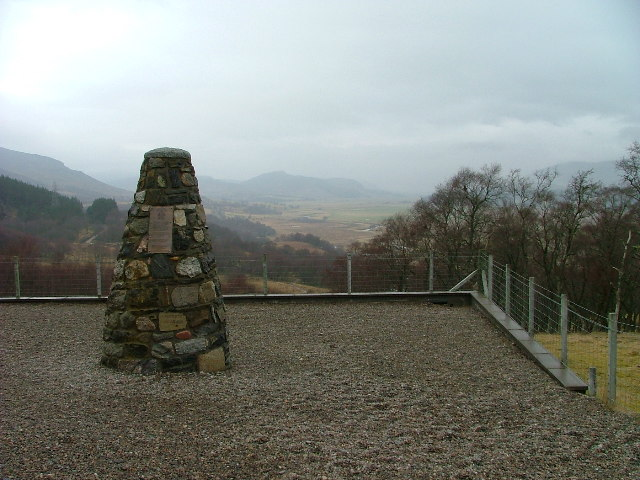
Clan MacPherson Memorial Cairn

== See also ==
- Macpherson, list of people with the surname
- Scottish clan
- Kidnapped (novel)
