= Comyn's Road =

Historic road in Perth and Kinross, Scotland

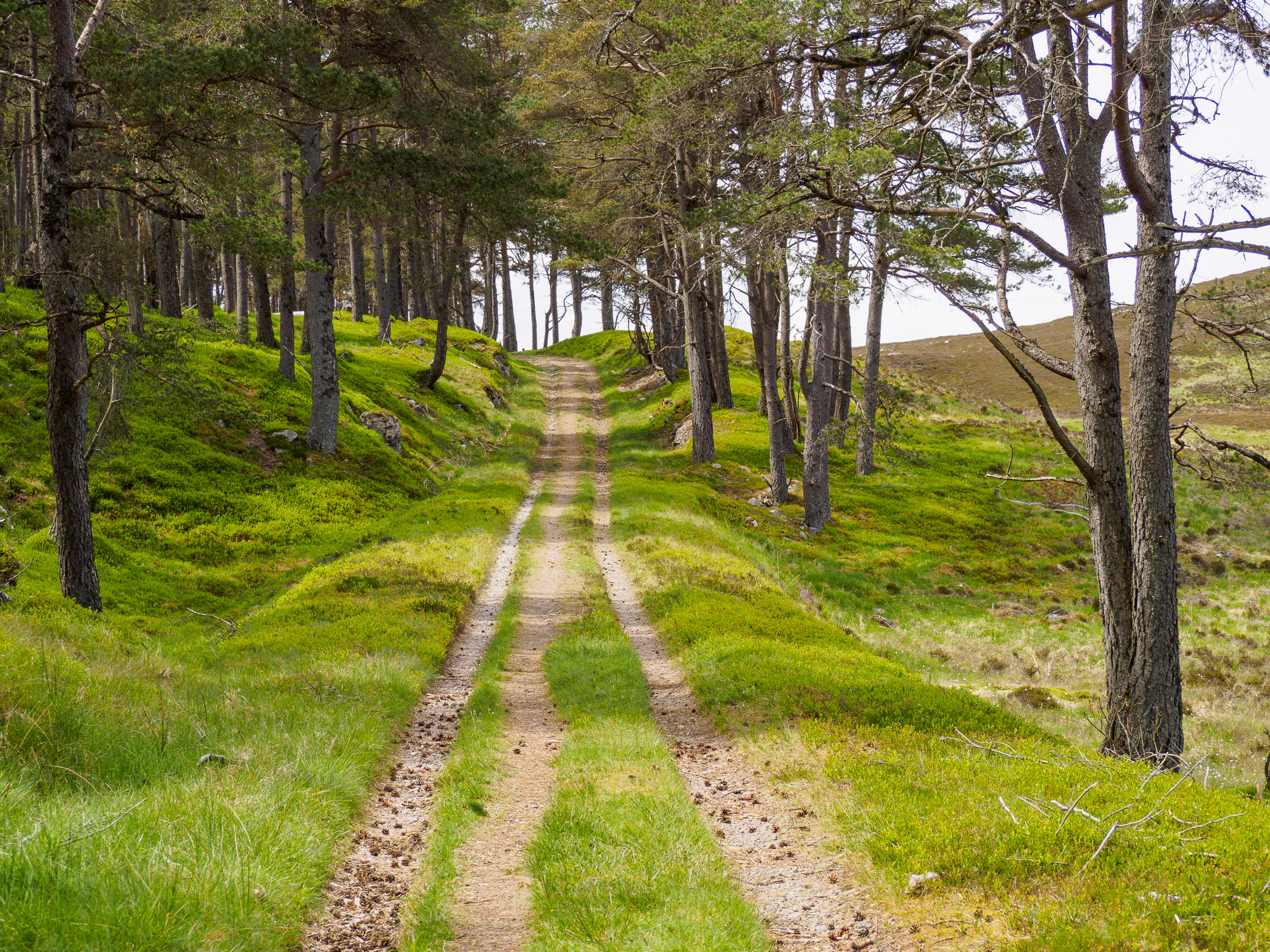
- A section of the road around 1.75 miles northwest of Old Blair, Perth and Kinross
- Interactive map of Comyn's Road
- Namesake: Clan Cumming (Clan Comyn)
- Length: 27 mi (43 km)
- Location: Perth and Kinross and Highland, Scotland

Construction
- Completion: 13th century

Comyn's Road is an ancient roadway in Scotland, linking Blair Atholl in Perth and Kinross and Ruthven, Badenoch, in the Highlands. Named for Clan Cumming (Clan Comyn), it runs for 27 miles (43 km), although today it is only visible in the high ground between Dalnamein Forest and Gaick Forest.

The road dates to the mediaeval period, and was in use until the 17th century, when a shorter route, the Minigaig, was favoured.

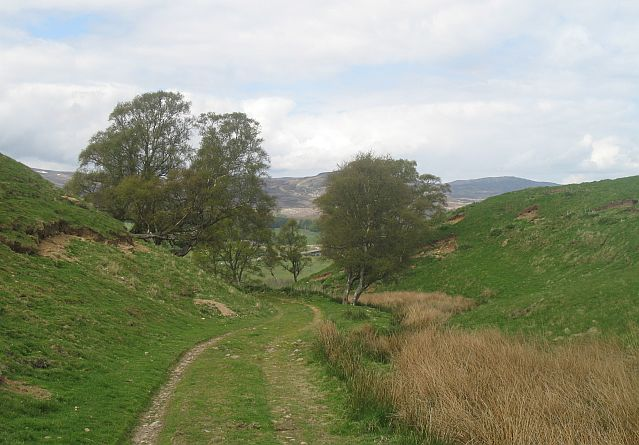
The last part of the Gaick road runs down through farmland to Ruthven
