= James Macpherson =

Scottish writer, poet, literary collector and politician (1736–1796)

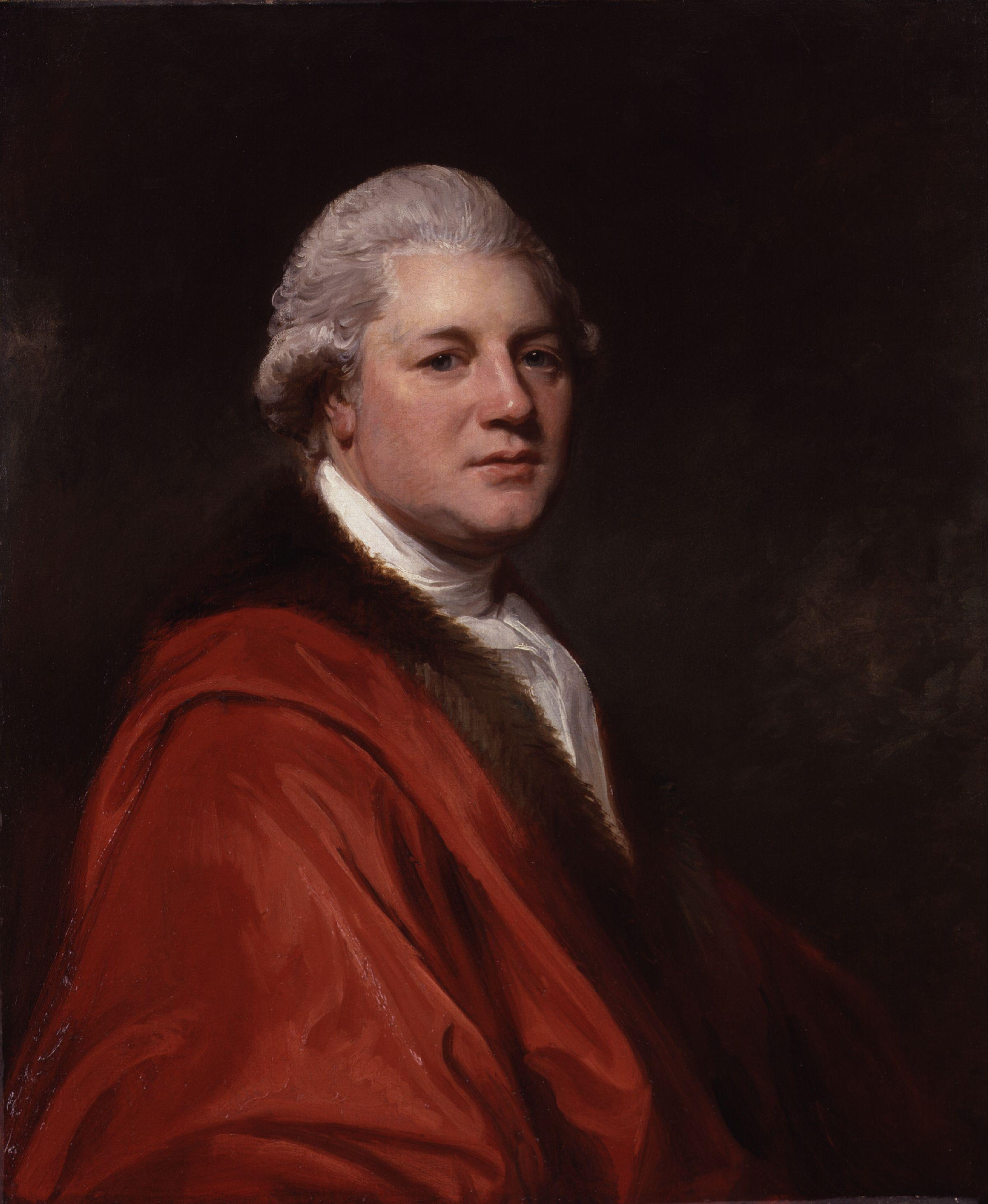
- Portrait of James Macpherson by George Romney, 1780
- Born: 27 October 1736; Ruthven, Inverness-shire, Scotland
- Died: 17 February 1796 (aged 59); Belville, Inverness-shire, Scotland
- Education: Marischal College, Aberdeen; University of Edinburgh
- Occupations: Poet, translator
- Writing career
- Movement: Romanticism

James Macpherson (Gaelic: Seumas MacMhuirich or Seumas Mac a' Phearsain; 27 October 1736 – 17 February 1796) was a Scottish writer, poet, literary collector, and politician. He is known for the Ossian cycle of epic poems, which he claimed to have discovered and translated from Gaelic.

== Early life and education ==
Macpherson was born at Ruthven in the parish of Kingussie in Badenoch, Inverness-shire. This was a Scottish Gaelic-speaking area but near the Ruthven Barracks of the British Army, established in 1719 to enforce Whig rule from London after the Jacobite uprising of 1715. Macpherson's uncle, Ewen Macpherson joined the Jacobite army in the 1745 march south, when Macpherson was nine years old and after the Battle of Culloden, had had to remain in hiding for nine years. In the 1752-3 session, Macpherson was sent to King's College, Aberdeen, moving two years later to Marischal College (the two institutions later became the University of Aberdeen), reading Caesar's Commentaries on the relationships between the 'primitive' Germanic tribes and the 'enlightened' Roman imperial army; it is also believed that he attended classes at the University of Edinburgh as a divinity student in 1755–56. During his years as a student, he ostensibly wrote over 4,000 lines of verse, some of which was later published, notably The Highlander (1758), a six-canto epic poem, which he attempted to suppress sometime after its publication.

== Collecting Scottish Gaelic poetry ==
On leaving college, he returned to Ruthven to teach in the school there, and then became a private tutor. At Moffat he met John Home, the author of Douglas, for whom he recited some Gaelic verses from memory. He also showed him manuscripts of Gaelic poetry, supposed to have been picked up in the Scottish Highlands and the Western Isles; one was called The Death of Oscar.

In 1760, Macpherson visited North Uist and met with John MacCodrum, the official Bard to the Chief of Clan MacDonald of Sleat. As a result of their encounter, MacCodrum made, according to John Lorne Campbell, "a brief appearance in the Ossianic controversy which is not without its humorous side." When Macpherson met MacCodrum, he asked, "A bheil dad agaibh air an Fheinne?" Macpherson believed himself to have asked, "Do you know anything of the Fianna?" He had actually said, however, "Do the Fianna owe you anything?"

In reply, MacCodrum quipped, "Cha n-eil agus ge do bhiodh cha ruiginn a leas iarraidh a nis", or in English, "No, and if they did it would be useless to ask for it now." According to Campbell, this dialogue "illustrates at once Macpherson's imperfect Gaelic and MacCodrum's quickness of reply."

Encouraged by Home and others, Macpherson produced 15 pieces, all laments for fallen warriors, translated from the Scottish Gaelic, despite his limitations in that tongue, which he was induced to publish at Edinburgh in 1760, including the Death of Oscar, in a pamphlet: Fragments of Ancient Poetry collected in the Highlands of Scotland. Extracts were then published in The Scots Magazine and The Gentleman's Magazine which were popular and the notion of these fragments as glimpses of an unrecorded Gaelic epic began.

Hugh Blair, who was a firm believer in the authenticity of the poems, raised a subscription to allow Macpherson to pursue his Gaelic researches. In the autumn,1760, Macpherson set out to visit western Inverness-shire, the islands of Skye, North Uist, South Uist and Benbecula. Allegedly, Macpherson obtained manuscripts which he translated with the assistance of a Captain Morrison and the Rev. Gallie. Later he made an expedition to the Isle of Mull, where he claimed to obtain other manuscripts.

== Ossian ==
In 1761, Macpherson announced the discovery of an epic on the subject of Fingal supposedly written by Ossian, which he published in December. Like the 1760 Fragments of Ancient Poetry, it was written in musical measured prose. The full title of the work was Fingal, an Ancient Epic Poem in Six Books, together with Several Other Poems composed by Ossian, the Son of Fingal, translated from the Gaelic Language. The narrative was related to the Irish mythological character Fionn mac Cumhaill/Finn McCool. The figure of Ossian was based on Fionn's son Oisín. Fingal takes his name from Fionnghall, meaning "white stranger". Another related poem, Temora, followed in 1763, and a collected edition, The Works of Ossian, in 1765.

The authenticity of these translations from the works of a 3rd-century bard was immediately challenged by Irish historians, especially Charles O'Conor, who noted technical errors in chronology and in the forming of Gaelic names, and commented on the implausibility of many of Macpherson's claims, none of which Macpherson was able to substantiate. More forceful denunciations were later made by Samuel Johnson, who asserted (in A Journey to the Western Islands of Scotland, 1775) that Macpherson had found fragments of poems and stories, and then woven them into a romance of his own composition. Further challenges and defences were made well into the nineteenth century, but the issue was moot by then. Macpherson's manuscript Gaelic "originals" were published posthumously in 1807; Ludwig Christian Stern was sure they were in fact back-translations from his English version.

== Later works ==
In 1764 Macpherson was made secretary to the colonial governor George Johnstone at Pensacola, Florida. He returned to Great Britain two years later, and, despite a quarrel with Johnstone, was allowed to retain his salary as a pension.

Macpherson went on to write several historical works, the most important of which was Original Papers, containing the Secret History of Great Britain from the Restoration to the Accession of the House of Hanover, to which are prefixed Extracts from the Life of James II, as written by himself (1775).

== Member of Parliament ==
Macpherson enjoyed a salary for defending the policy of Lord North's government, and simultaneously held the lucrative post of London agent to the Nawab of Arcot. As a government-sponsored candidate, he entered parliament in 1780 as a member for Camelford, at a cost of £4,000 (equivalent to £620,000 in 2025), probably funded by the Nawab. He continued to sit for the remainder of his life.

Usurping the name of George Germain (the uncompromising Secretary of State for the Colonies) as the supposed author, Macpherson penned an outspoken response in defence of King George III to the American Declaration of Independence entitled The Rights of Great Britain (1776), dismissing Thomas Jefferson's famous work as containing "nothing but empty declamation" and "merit[ing] little notice."

Macpherson's reputation as an "laborious and able writer" led to his enrolment as a political pamphleteer, satirist and newspaper columnist in support of the Grafton ministry and the succeeding administration of Lord North, in exchange for the promise of a pension-for-life. This was paid clandestinely, because he (together with his brother James) used as may as forty aliases in their writings, to suggest that the views they expressed were popular and widespread. Under his own name he defended government policy in the north American colonies (The Rights of Great Britain Asserted Against the Claims of America of 1776) and he denounced the East India Company at a time when government policy was seeking to limit the organisation's power (The History and Management of the East India Company of 1799). (Note: His support for Indian local rulers (he was the London agent for the Nawab of Arcot) against the East India Company did not preclude his deriving a large fortune from his investment in the company.)

== Death ==
In his later years he bought an estate, to which he gave the name Belville or Balavil, in his native Inverness-shire, where he died at the age of 59. Macpherson's remains were carried from Scotland and interred in Westminster Abbey. The Crofters Party MP and antiquarian Charles Fraser-Mackintosh commented on the success of James Macpherson in his second series of Antiquarian Notes (Inverness 1897, pp 369 et seq, public domain), accusing the famous poet of being a perpetrator of the Highland Clearances:

Mr James Macpherson of Ossianic fame, who acquired Phoiness, Etterish, and Invernahaven, began this wretched business and did it so thoroughly that not much remained for his successors ... Every place James Macpherson acquired was cleared, and he also had a craze for changing and obliterating the old names ... [including] ... Raitts into Belville. Upon this point it may be noticed that Mac Ossian, in making an entail and calling four of his numerous bastards in the first instance to the succession, declares an irritancy if any of the heirs uses any other designation than that of Macpherson of Belville.

Fraser-Mackintosh then asserts that Macpherson bought the right to be buried in Westminster Abbey. A recent commentator suggests Macpherson has become known as "a descendant of a Jacobite clan who became a sycophantic Hanovarian [sic] toady, a man for the main chance". His outlook towards his tenants seemed to soften, however, after his retirement: his kindness and generosity to his tenants was noted and Anne Grant, a neighbour, found in him "a great inclination to be an indulgent landlord and very liberal to the poor". A monument to his local philanthropy was erected in the grounds of his estate.

== Legacy ==
Macpherson had five acknowledged children, three sons and two daughters, whom he supported during his lifetime and made beneficiaries in his will. James, the eldest, became an officer of the East India Company and inherited the estate; Charles, the second son, died in India; the record does not identify the third son. His daughters were Ann, who succeeded James as inheritrix, and Juliet, who married the physicist David Brewster.

After Macpherson's death, Malcolm Laing, in an appendix to his History of Scotland (1800), concluded that the so-called Ossianic poems were altogether modern in origin, and that Macpherson's authorities were practically non-existent.

Despite the above, some critics claim that Macpherson nonetheless produced a work of art which by its deep appreciation of natural beauty and the melancholy tenderness of its treatment of the ancient legend did more than any single work to bring about the romantic movement in European, and especially in German, literature. It was quickly translated into many European languages, and Herder and Goethe (in his earlier period) were among its profound admirers. Goethe incorporated his translation of a part of the work into his novel The Sorrows of Young Werther. Melchiore Cesarotti's Italian translation was reputedly a favourite of Napoleon.

Macpherson's legacy indirectly includes the naming of Fingal's Cave on the island of Staffa. The original Gaelic name is "An Uamh Bhin" ("the melodious cave"), but it was renamed by Sir Joseph Banks in 1772 at the height of Macpherson's popularity.

== See also ==
- Iolo Morganwg
