= Battle of the North Inch =

Staged battle between the Clan Chattan and the "Clan Quhele" in September 1396

Coordinates: 56°24′0″N 3°25′48″W

- Part of Clan Cameron-Clan Mackintosh feud
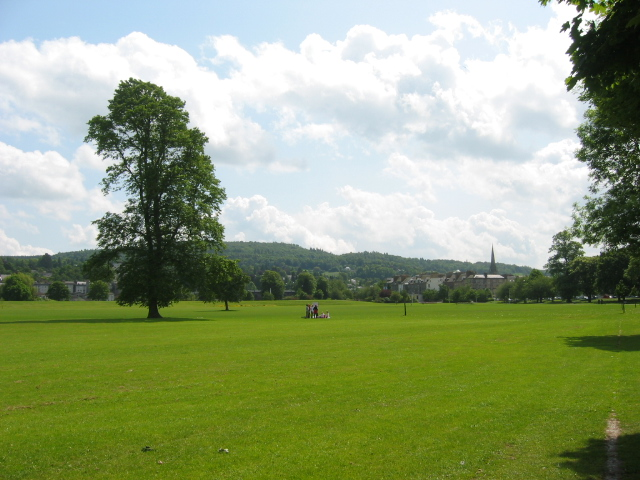
- Perth's North Inch in modern times, looking southeast towards the city's eastern edge.
Date	late September 1396
Location	North Inch, Perth, Scotland grid reference NO11752397
Result	Chattan (Mackintosh) victory

Belligerents
Chattan Confederation or Clan Mackintosh	"Clan Quhele" (Camerons or Davidsons?)

Strength
30 men	30 men

Casualties and losses
19 dead	29 dead
- Location within Scotland

The Battle of the North Inch (also known as the Battle of the Clans) was a staged battle between the Clan Chattan and the "Clan Quhele" in September 1396. Thirty men were selected to represent each side in front of spectators, including King Robert III of Scotland and his court, on land that is now the North Inch park in Perth, Scotland.

The Clan Chattan killed all but one of their opponents, at a cost of 19 deaths on their own side, and were awarded the victory. It is not clear whom they were fighting: it may have been their traditional enemies Clan Cameron, or it may have been Clan Davidson, in an internal dispute for precedence in the confederation of Clan Chattan.

== Contemporary evidence ==
Contemporary evidence for the battle from the time when the battle is said to have taken place is found in the Chamberlain Rolls from 26 April 1396 to 1 June 1397, held at Edinburgh Register House and entitled Computum Custumariorum burgi de Perth, in which a sum equal to about £14 is recorded for the timber, iron, and the erection of the "lists", the enclosure fence for the designated field of combat on the Inch (island).

According to historian Alexander Mackintosh-Shaw, the next historic record and first actual account of the battle is in Orygynale Cronykil of Scotland, which was written by Andrew of Wyntoun (c. 1350 – c. 1425) in about 1420. The battle is mentioned by Walter Bower (c. 1385–1449) in his work Scotichronicon.

The battle is also recorded by four 16th-century historians: John Major (1467–1550) in his History of Greater Britain and whose account follows that given previously by Bower, Hector Boece (1465–1536) in his Historia Gentis Scotorum (History of the Scottish People), George Buchanan (1506-1582) in his History of Scotland, Rerum Scoticarum Historia and John Lesley (1527–1596) in his De origine, moribus, ac rebus gestis Scotiae libri decem. However, according to Mackintosh-Shaw, Boece and Lesley, having flourished so long after the events that they describe, their testimony is of slight importance.

== Background ==
Walter Scott, in the preface of his novel The Fair Maid of Perth (1828), which was inspired by the battle, states that there has been some controversy as to exactly which clans fought in the battle and that Robert Mackay of Thurso who treated the battle with some detail in his History of the House and Clan of Mackay (1829), stated that the Clan Mackay did not take part in the battle. Robert Mackay stated that a celebrated writer had asserted that one of the clans who took part in the battle, the Clan Kay or Quhele, was the Clan Mackay. However, Mackay was of the opinion that the Clan Quhele described in the earliest account of the battle by Andrew of Wyntoun was the Clan Cameron. William Forbes Skene was of the opposing opinion that the Clan Quhele was the Mackintoshes of Clan Chattan. According to historians Lachlan Shaw and John Scott Keltie the opposing combatants were the Clan Macpherson and Clan Davidson who were both part of the confederation of Clan Chattan but who were at enmity with each other.

According to Mackintosh-Shaw, no writer on the subject of the battle has ever denied that the Clan Chattan was involved in this famous fight, either against one of its own septs or against another clan. The Clan Chattan consisted of several septs who according to Mackintosh-Shaw have variously been said to have fought in the battle, either against each other or against the Clan Cameron, but that the weight of evidence is in favour of it having been fought by the Mackintoshes and Macphersons of the Clan Chattan against the Clan Cameron.

The Clan Cameron and Mackintoshes of Clan Chattan had previously fought each other at the Battle of Invernahavon in 1370 or 1386, and according to Lachlan Shaw this gave occasion to the battle on the North Inch at Perth in 1396. At the King's insistence, David Lindsay, 1st Earl of Crawford and Dunbar, had attempted to get the two feuding clans to settle their differences amicably. This failed, however, which led the two chiefs to put forth the notion of a trial by combat between members of the two parties, with the monarch awarding honours to the victors and a pardon to the defeated.

== Battle ==
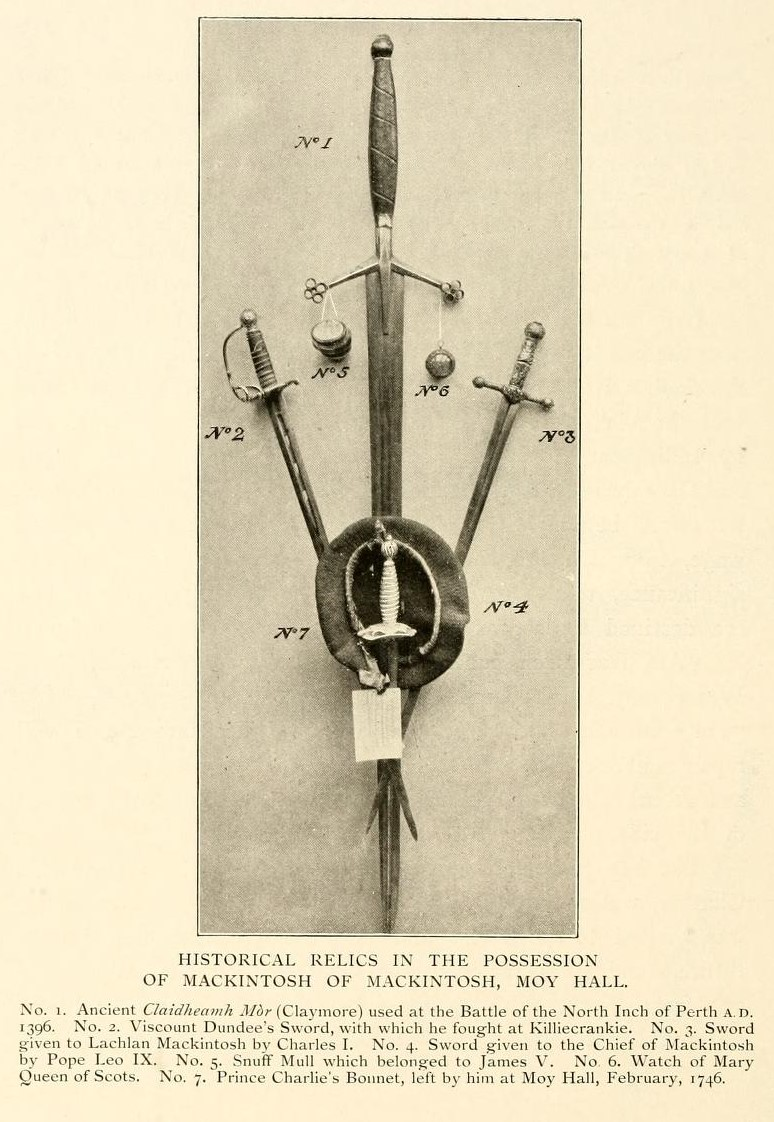
Claymore (No.1) used at the Battle of the North Inch in 1396.

The clansmen agreed, and the Monday before Michaelmas was agreed as the day of the combat. Although the numbers involved in the battle have been variously reported, the numbers given in the earliest historical accounts state that there were thirty on each side. Barriers were erected to stop spectators encroaching on the battlefield and King Robert III took up his position on a platform from which the combat could easily be seen. The warriors were armed with swords, targes, bows and arrows, knives, and battle-axes. The two clans lined up in a purpose-built enclosure on the North Inch at Perth.

As the combat was about to commence one of the Macphersons of Clan Chattan fell sick and it was proposed that their enemy should leave one man out so that the numbers on each side remained even. However, a volunteer named Henry Gow (or Smith; nicknamed Hal o' the Wynd) agreed to step in for a fee if he survived. A "murderous conflict" then began which resulted in the death of nineteen of the Macphersons of Clan Chattan and twenty-nine of the opposing clan, given in this instance by James Browne as the Davidsons.

In Walter Scott's The Fair Maid of Perth the following romanticized and fictional account is given:

The trumpets of the King sounded a charge, the bagpipes blew up their screaming and maddening notes, and the combatants, starting forward in regular order, and increasing their pace, till they came to a smart run, met together in the centre of the ground, as a furious land torrent encounters an advancing tide.

Blood flowed fast, and the groans of those who fell began to mingle with the cries of those who fought. The wild notes of the pipes were still heard above the tumult and stimulated to further exertion the fury of the combatants.

At once, however, as if by mutual agreement, the instruments sounded a retreat. The two parties disengaged themselves from each other to take breath for a few minutes. About twenty of both sides lay on the field, dead or dying; arms and legs lopped off, heads cleft to the chin, slashes deep through the shoulder to the breast, showed at once the fury of the combat, the ghastly character of the weapons used, and the fatal strength of the arms which wielded them.

== Aftermath ==
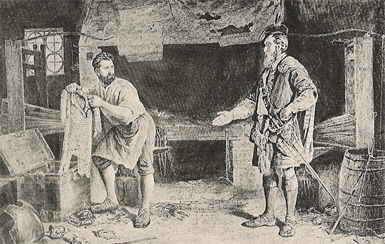
Henry Smith (left) and a Highlander in Walter Scott's The Fair Maid of Perth.

Most accounts concur that only eleven members of Clan Chattan (including Henry Wynd or Smith) and one of the Camerons survived the battle. The author's introduction to the Lochiel Memoirs published in 1842 gives an account which states that ten Mackintoshes survived but were all mortally wounded and that only one Cameron survived. The latter, realising his was a lost cause, jumped into the River Tay and swam to safety. Andrew of Wyntoun stated that fifty or more were slain in the battle. The volunteer, Henry Wynd or Smith, a swordsman who survived the battle and who contributed greatly to the success of his side was invited north to join the Clan Chattan and from him descends the clan's Gow or Smith sept. According to Charles Fraser-Mackintosh a Bond of Union was granted among the Clan Chattan in 1397 but has for some time been missing, unlike two later bonds of the clan from 1664 and 1756 which have survived. The Clan Cameron and Clan Chattan fought each other again at the Battle of Palm Sunday in 1429.

== See also ==
- Battle of Champions between Clan Keith and Clan Gunn around 1464.
- Combat of the Thirty, similar battle in Brittany, 1351.
