= Castle of King Edward =

Ruined castle in Aberdeenshire, Scotland

Location
- Coordinates: 57.59430652°N 2.465115169°W

Site history
- Built: 14th century

The Castle of King Edward (Note: Also known as Kinnedar Castle. King Edward is a corruption of Kinedar) is a 13th-century ruined castle near King Edward, Aberdeenshire, Scotland, located 6 kilometres (3.7 mi) north of Turriff, where the A947 crosses the Burn of King Edward, and 2 miles (3.2 km) east of the River Deveron. The castle was the caput of the feudal barony of King Edward.

== History ==
The castle dates from the 13th and 14th centuries, when it was occupied by the Comyn, Earls of Buchan, before it was likely slighted in 1308 by Robert the Bruce in the Harrying of Buchan during the First War of Scottish Independence. The property passed to Clan Ross, to Alexander Stewart, Earl of Buchan the Wolf of Badenoch, and to the MacDonald Earls of Ross.

It was forfeited in 1455, and subsequently the Forbes family acquired it in 1509. Written evidence from 1509 suggests that the castle was rebuilt in the 16th century by Lord Forbes, although little physical evidence of this has been found.

== Structure ==
The castle was built on a knoll on the north side of the Burn of King Edward. There are two bridges at the site currently, which suggests that this may have been a strategic site when the castle was built. The castle was laid out as a courtyard running from north-west to south-east, surrounded on all four sides by walls and buildings. The great hall was on the north-east side of the courtyard, and the gatehouse was on the north-west curtain. A drawbridge was used to cross a ditch to enter the castle.

The castle now is largely ruined, with the remains of some structures still standing.
