= James Gow =

James Gow may refer to:

- James Gow (painter) († 1886), British painter
- James Gow (scholar) 1854–1923), English scholar, educator, historian, and author
- James Gow (politician) (1862–1942), member of the New Zealand Legislative Council
- James Gow (writer) (1907–1952), American writer
