= Clan Cumming =

Scottish clan

- Na Cuimeinich
- Motto: Courage
- Slogan: An Cuimeanach! An Cuimeanach!
- War cry: Fhad 's a bhios maide sa choill, cha bhi foill an Cuimeineach ("as long as there is a stick in the woods, there won't be deceit from Clan Cumming")

Profile
- Region: Highland & Lowland
- District: Badenoch
- Plant badge: Common Sallow (Salix cinerea) (the Pussy Willow) Cummin plant
- Animal: Lion
- Pipe music: Willie Cumming's Rant

Chief
- Sir Alexander Penrose Gordon-Cumming of Altyre
- Chief of clan Cumming, Baronet of Altyre
- Seat: Altyre House, Forres, Moray, Scotland
- Historic seat: Lochindorb Castle; Inverlochy Castle
Septs of Clan Cumming
Bad(d)enoch, Buchan, Boghan, Chaney(ay), Chesney, Cheyne(y), Coman(s), Common(s), Comins, Commins, Comyn(s), Cowman(s), Cummin(s), Cummings, Comeens, Landrum, Lendrum, MacCheine, MacCheyne(y), MacChesnie, MacCummin(s), MacCumming(s), MacNiven(s), MacSkimman(on), Niven(son), Nivison, Russell, Skimman(on)
Clan branches
Comyn Lords of Badenoch (historic chiefs)
Comyn Earls of Buchan (historic senior cadets)
Cumming of Altyre (current chiefs)
Cumming of Culter
Cumming of Inverallochy
Cumming of Logie
Cumming of Regulas
Allied clans
Clan Wallace
Clan MacDougall
Clan MacDowall
Clan Sinclair
Clan Maxwell
Clan Hay
Rival clans
Clan Brodie
Clan Grant
Clan Mackintosh
Clan Macpherson
Clan Shaw

Clan Cumming (Scottish Gaelic: Na Cuimeinich [nə ˈkʰɯ̃mɛnɪç]), historically known as Clan Comyn, is a Scottish clan from the central Highlands that played a major role in the history of 13th-century Scotland and in the Wars of Scottish Independence. The Clan Comyn was once the most powerful family in 13th-century Scotland, until they were defeated in civil war by their rival to the Scottish throne, Robert the Bruce.

== History ==
=== Origin of the clan ===
Like many of the families that came to power under King David I of Scotland, the Comyn clan is of Norman or Flemish origin. The surname may be a place-name, possibly derived from Bosc-Bénard-Commin, near Rouen in the Duchy of Normandy, or from Comines, near Lille, in France.

Richard Comyn, the nephew of William Comyn, chancellor to King David, is the one who established this family in Scotland. His son was William Comyn, who married Marjory, Countess of Buchan. William's mother was Hextilda, the granddaughter of king Donald III of Scotland. His son was Walter Comyn, the man who acquired the lordship of Badenoch. The seat of power was Ruthven Castle. Ruthven Castle commanded the northern end of two passes over the Mounth, the Drumochter and Minigaig passes. This lordship passed to his nephew, the first John Comyn. This John was the first to be known as "the Red" Comyn. He was a descendant of William Comyn, Earl of Buchan, by the earl's first wife, Sarah Fitz Hugh.

The chiefs also possessed the lordship of Lochaber. Here can be found the remains of Inverlochy Castle, built by the Comyns about 1270–1280.

The Comyns were forced to sign an oath of allegiance to Henry III of England in 1244. However, the English king recognised the Comyns' political leadership in Scotland when in 1251, as the father-in-law to Alexander III of Scotland, he returned them to power during the minority period. It was only when Henry supported a take over of the Scottish government in 1255 that the Comyns resorted to kidnapping the young Alexander III in 1257. When Alexander III's minority ended, the Comyns, instead of suffering political eclipse dominated public offices between 1260 and 1286.

=== John "the Black" Comyn ===
The son of the first John Comyn was John II Comyn, Lord of Badenoch, known as the Black Comyn. He had a claim to the throne based on his descent from King Donald III of Scotland. John was made one of the six guardians of Scotland after the death of King Alexander III, in 1286. Their duty was to act as regents for Margaret of Norway, heir to the Scottish throne; however, she died en route to Scotland. King Edward I of England was asked to step in and decide who had the best claim to the crown of Scotland. He decided in favour of John Balliol. John Comyn had married Eleanor Balliol, daughter of John I de Balliol, between 1270 and 1283. The Black Comyn died at Lochindorb Castle in about 1303, a castle the Comyns built in the thirteenth century.

An anonymous sister of John II Comyn of Badenoch married Sir Andrew Moray of Petty. Murray and Comyn had a son, named Andrew, who with William Wallace would lead a Scottish army to victory at the Battle of Stirling Bridge on 11 September 1297.

=== John "the Red" Comyn ===
==== Wars of Scottish Independence ====
The son of the Black Comyn was John, known as the Red Comyn (John III Comyn, Lord of Badenoch). This John Comyn was a descendant of both kings Donald III and David I, as his maternal grandmother was Devorguilla of Galloway, the daughter of Margaret of Huntingdon. John Comyn married Joan de Valence. At this time the two main branches of the Clan Comyn were the Comyn Lords of Badenoch and Lochaber, and the Comyn Earls of Buchan.

By controlling key castles, the Comyns also controlled the main lines of communication, especially in northern Scotland, where their power stretched from Inverlochy Castle in the west to Slains Castle in the east. Between these two points, they had allied forces strategically situated in the following castles: Ruthven Castle, Lochindorb Castle, Blair Castle, Balvenie Castle, Dundarg Castle, Cairnbulg Castle, Castle of Rattray and Kingedward. In particular Clan Comyn castles controlled important passes from the north and west highlands into the Tay basin. A third main branch of the Clan Comyn, the Comyns of Kilbride, held power in southern and central Scotland. They held castles at Kirkintilloch (Dumbartonshire), Dalswinton (Nithsdale), Cruggleton Castle (Galloway), Bedrule, Scraesburgh (Roxburghshire) and Kilbride (East Kilbride). In addition to their private holdings, the Clan Comyn also held a number of royal castles through their role as hereditary sheriffs at Dingwall Castle, Banff Castle (in the north) and Wigtown in the south west. In the early 1290s, the Clan Comyn took additional responsibility for royal castles, including Aberdeen Castle and Jedburgh Castle, as well as castles at Kirkcudbright, Clunie, Dull and Brideburgh.

Comyn influence over the political scene was strengthened by marriages with the earls of Marr, Ross, Angus, Strathearn and Fife, and with the powerful families of Clan MacDougall, Clan Murray, the Balliols, Mowbrays, Umphravilles and Soules. Other prominent allies of the Comyns were the Clan Graham, Clan Fraser, Clan Sinclair, the Cheynes, Mowats, Lochores, Clan Maxwell and Clan Hay.

The long-standing authority of the Clan Comyn (Cumming) was witnessed by their extended tenure of the Justiciarship of Scotia, the most important political and administrative office in the kingdom. Three successive Comyn Lords of Badenoch and Earls of Buchan were justiciars of Scotia for no fewer than sixty six years between 1205 and 1304. See: William Comyn, Lord of Badenoch and Alexander Comyn, Earl of Buchan.

After suffering a succession of indignities, the Scottish people were forced into rebellion. John III Comyn, Lord of Badenoch, known as John "the red" Comyn was a leader in Scottish independence. With the outbreak of war between England and Scotland, Comyn, his father, and his cousin, John Comyn, Earl of Buchan, crossed the border and attacked Carlisle on 26 March 1296, defended for King Edward I of England by Robert Bruce, Earl of Carrick, the father of the future king of Scotland.

John Comyn became the most powerful political and military leader in Scotland from 1302 to 1304. He led the Scottish army against the English in the Battle of Roslin, 23 February 1303. John's greatly outnumbered army faced and beat the well-trained English army. However, many of the Red Comyn's allies made peace with King Edward I of England, and so John submitted to Edward at Strathhord on 9 February 1304.

On 10 February 1306 John Comyn, Lord of Badenoch and Robert the Bruce met in the church of the Grey Friars, Dumfries where Bruce murdered Comyn. The reasons are disputed. One account claims that the Bruce knew he had to gain the support of John Comyn; however, John was outraged when it was proposed he betray his terms with King Edward I of England. It is likely that Robert Bruce stabbed the Red Comyn at the high altar, and his companions finished the job. Sir Robert Comyn, uncle to the Comyn chief, was killed while defending his nephew. Both the Comyn chief titles as Lord of Badenoch and Earl of Buchan were forfeited to the crown.

John Comyn's son, also named John, was defeated by Robert the Bruce in a skirmish. Comyn fled to join the English and was later killed at the Battle of Bannockburn in 1314, fighting with the English, against Bruce. Any hopes of the Comyns returning to power ended at Bannockburn. Adomar Comyn, the son of John, died just two years later and was the last male of the Badenoch line. The lands in Badenoch, once the centre of Comyn power, were given to the Clan Macpherson for supporting Robert Bruce. The fall of the Badenoch Comyns removed the Comyns from politics in Scotland although other branches of the clan continued to thrive. The spelling of the name Comyn generally became Cumming and the Cummings of Altyre were recognised as the clan chiefs.

=== 14th-, 15th- & 16th-century clan conflicts ===
At the beginning of the fifteenth century, Clan Comyn, now known as Clan Cumming, had been reduced to a Highland clan. But its members played a significant part in the history and culture of the Badenoch, Strathspey, and Aberdeenshire regions of Scotland.

In the fifteenth and sixteenth centuries, the Cummings carried on significant, and bloody, feuds with Clan Macpherson, Clan Shaw, and Clan Brodie over lands in Nairnshire. In 1550 Alexander Brodie, chief of Clan Brodie and 100 others were denounced as rebels for attacking the Cummings of Altyre.

In 1424, the Comyns forcibly took possession of some of the Clan Mackintosh lands at Meikle Geddes and Rait, but Malcolm Mackintosh retaliated and put many of the Comyns to the sword. This action was met with retaliation by the Comyns, who invaded the Mackintosh homeland of Moy and unsuccessfully tried to drown the Mackintoshes on their island of Moy. A feast of reconciliation was held at the Comyn's castle of Rait, but the Mackintoshes slaughtered their Comyn hosts.

In 1594, the Clan Cumming supported the Earl of Huntly, chief of Clan Gordon, along with the Clan Cameron at the Battle of Glenlivet, where they defeated the Earl of Argyll, chief of Clan Campbell. He was supported by the Chattan Confederation of Clan Mackintosh, the Clan Murray, and the Clan Forbes.

During the late sixteenth and throughout the seventeenth century, members of the clan were known for their musical talents. They served as the hereditary pipers and fiddlers to the Laird of Grant of Clan Grant.

=== Cumming Clan today ===
Many members of the Cumming (Comyn) clan left Scotland for greener pastures, some went to Ireland, England and Wales; others later migrated in the eighteenth and nineteenth centuries to North America, Australia, South Africa, New Zealand and Mascarene Islands (Mauritius and La Réunion). Due to the diffusion of the clan, spelling of the family name changed over time. Spellings in different regions include, the Scottish Cumming or Comyn, the Irish Cummins or O'Comyn, as well as Cummin, Cummins, Cumins, Cummine, Coman, Cuming, Comins, Comin, Commins, Cumings, Cummings, Comings, Comeens, Commens, and Common.

== Chiefs and seat ==
After the death of the last chief in the Badenoch line, the chiefship fell on the Cummings of Altyre. It is retained by this family to the present. The current Chief is Sir Alexander "Alastair" Penrose Gordon-Cumming of Altyre, a descendant of Sir Robert Comyn, the knight who was killed while defending his nephew, John the Red Comyn.

- The clan seat is at Altyre, Moray, Scotland.

== Castles ==
Castles held by the Clan Comyn and later by their descendants the Clan Cumming have included amongst many others:

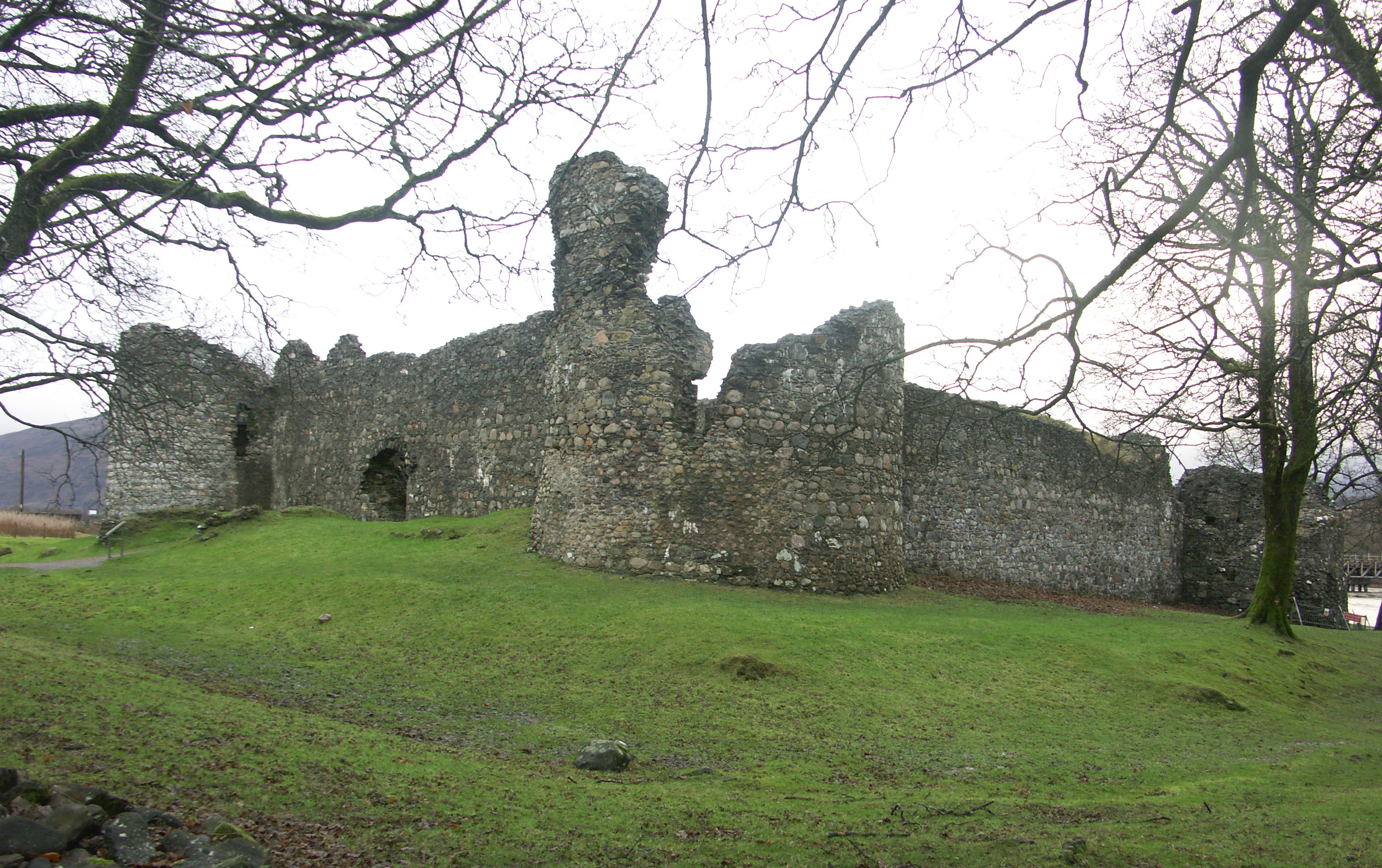
Inverlochy Castle, historic seat of the Clan Comyn

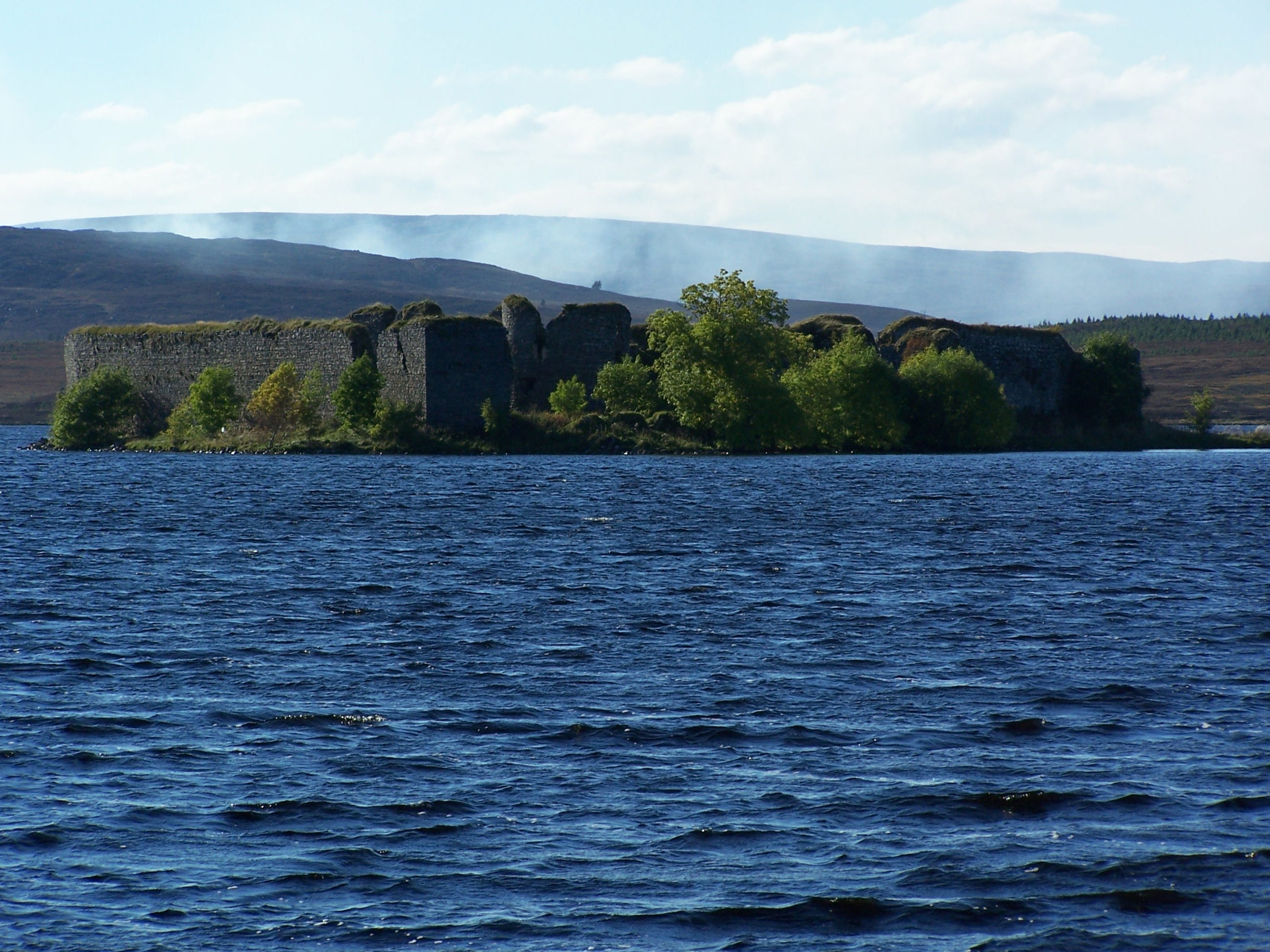
Lochindorb Castle, historic seat of the Clan Comyn

- Inverlochy Castle, a mile north-east of Fort William, is a ruinous courtyard castle that has a round tower at each corner, the largest of which is known as the Comyn's Tower. The castle was captured and destroyed by Robert I in 1307. The lands were held by the Comyns but passed to the Gordons of Huntly.
- Lochindorb Castle, near Grantown-on-Spey, held by the Comyns and visited by Edward I of England in 1303. Later passed to the Stewarts.
- Dunphail Castle, a few miles south of Forres, Moray, was a property of the Comyn's that was besieged in 1330, and as a result Alasdair Comyn of Dunphail and four of his men were captured after trying to leave the castle to find meal. They were beheaded and their heads flung over the walls, allegedly with the words "here's your beef for your bannocks". Five decapitated skeletons were reputedly found buried near the castle. The garrison of the castle also tried to flee but were slaughtered. Headless ghosts are said to haunt the old ruin and tales of the sounds of groans and fighting have also been reported. The lands later passed to the Dunbars, but nearby Dunphail House was built in 1828 for the Cummings, and it was designed by William Playfair.
- Balvenie Castle, Moray, Scotland, was held by the Comyns, but was slighted by their rival Robert the Bruce in 1308, and then passed to the Clan Douglas.
- Banff Castle, at Banff, Aberdeenshire.
- Bedrule Castle, in the Scottish Borders, held by the Comyns and visited by Edward I of England in 1298.
- Blair Castle, Perth, was once held by the Comyns.
- Cadzow Castle, Hamilton, South Lanarkshire.
- Castle Grant, Inverness, Scotland
- Castle of Rattray, Crimond, Aberdeenshire a ruin, though the land is still held by the family.
- Castle Roy, near Grantown-on-Spey.
- Comyn's Castle, near East Kilbride.
- Dalswinton Castle, Dumfries.
- Delgatie Castle, Aberdeenshire.
- Dundarg Castle, Aberdeenshire.
- Ellon Castle, Aberdeenshire.
- Inchtalla Castle, Stirlingshire.
- Kirkintilloch Castle, Lanarkshire.
- Old Slains Castle, Aberdeenshire.
- Pitsligo Castle, Rosehearty, Aberdeenshire, was held by the Comyns
- Pittulie Castle, near Rosehearty, Aberdeenshire, was held by the Cumines and the sold to Sir William Forbes
- Rait Castle, Nairn.
- Ruthven Barracks, near Kingussie, is the site of a castle once owned by the Comyns.
- Urquhart Castle, near Inverness.

== Tartans ==
Tartan image	Notes
	MacAulay or Comyn/Cumming: This tartan was first published by James Logan as a MacAulay tartan; it was illustrated in Logan and R. R. McIan's joint work, The Clans of the Scottish Highlands in 1845. An almost identical tartan, listed as a Cymyne (Comyn) tartan, appeared in the 1842 work, Vestiarium Scoticum, by the infamous 'Sobieski Stuarts'. By the 1850 work of W & K Smith, it is listed as the Comyn/Cumming tartan. The Smiths had claimed the tartan had the sanction of the head family of Cumming. Scottish Tartans World Register#1157
	Comyn: This tartan was first published in 1842, in the Vestiarium Scoticum. The Vestiarium was composed and illustrated by the "Sobieski Stuarts".

== Chief's arms ==
- Arms of the chief (Cumming): Azure, three garbs Or. Crest: A lion rampant Or holding in his dexter paw a dagger Proper. Motto: Courage. Supporters: Two horses Argent.
- Arms of the Comyns of Buchan: Azure, three garbs Or.
- Arms of the Comyns of Badenoch: Gules three garbs Or.
- Arms of Gordon-Cumming: Quarterly, 1st & 4th, three garbs Or (Cumming); 2nd & 3rd, Argent, three bends Sable, each charged with as many roses of the field (Penrose); overall, in an escutcheon Argent, is placed the Arms, Crest, Motto and Supporters of Gordon of Gordonston

== Religious sites ==
Clan Cumming is associated with these religious sites:

- Altyre Kirk, Moray, Scotland
- Cumbernauld Chapel, Lanark, Scotland
- Deer Abbey, Aberdeen, Scotland
- Glasgow Cathedral, Strathclyde, Scotland
- Inchmahome Priory, Perth, Scotland

== See also ==
- Battle of the Pass of Brander
- Battle of Roslin
- Comyn (disambiguation)
- Comyn's Road
- Cummins (disambiguation)
- Cummings (disambiguation)
- Buchan
- Earl of Buchan
- John "the Black" Comyn
- John "the Red" Comyn
- Commins (surname)
