= Lochindorb =

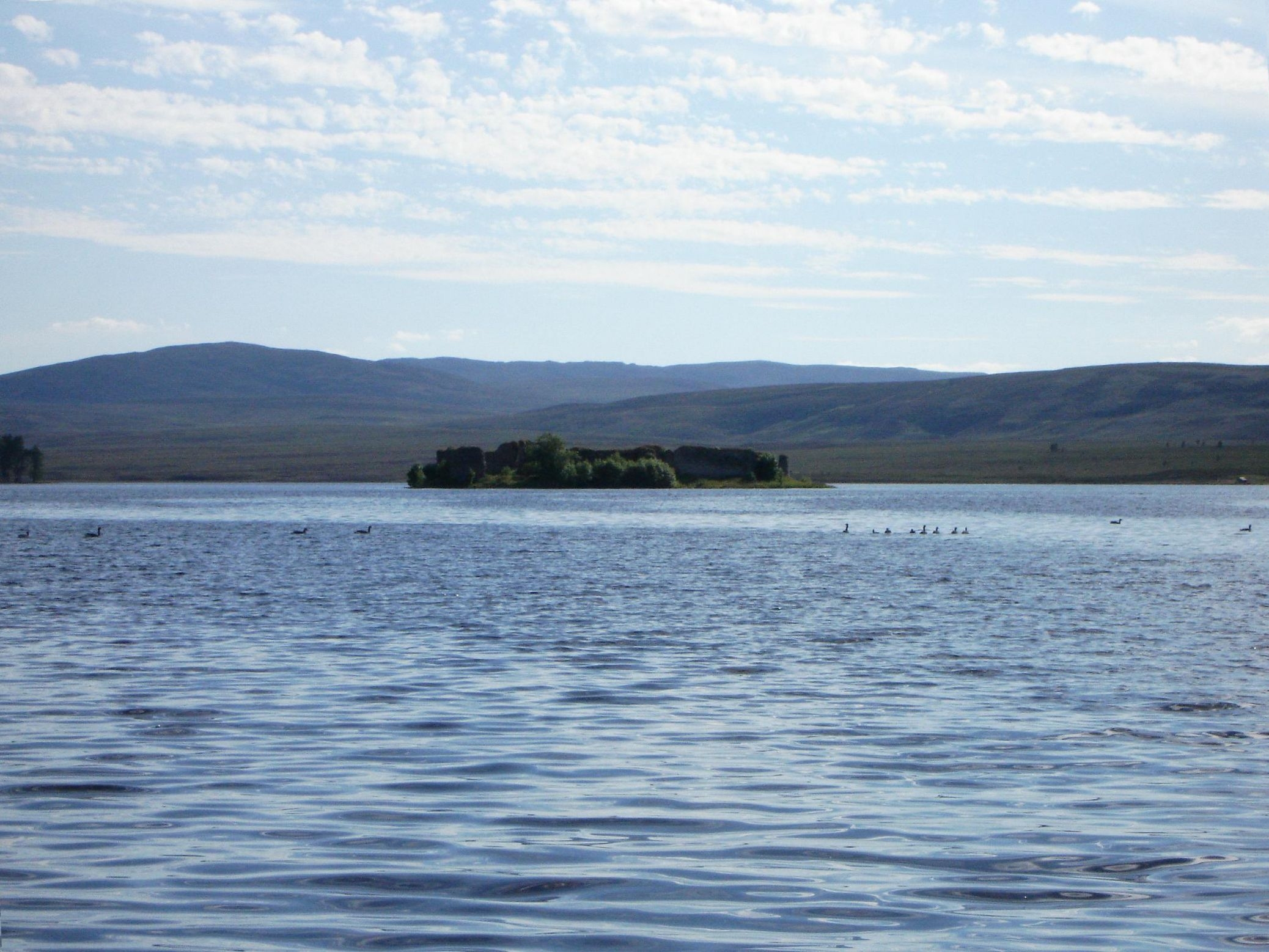
- Lochindorb Castle can only be reached by boat

- Location within Highland
- Location: Strathspey, Scotland
- Coordinates: 57°24′27″N 3°42′23″W
- Type: loch
- Basin countries: United Kingdom
- Islands: Lochindorb Castle

Lochindorb (from the Scottish Gaelic: Loch nan Doirb meaning "loch of the minnows") is a freshwater loch north of Grantown on Spey in the Highland council area of Scotland. In the loch there is an island, which is now thought to have been artificially created, and on that island are the ruins of Lochindorb Castle, a former stronghold of the Clan Comyn. King Edward I of England stayed in the castle during his 1303 campaign against the Scots. The loch is a popular spot with fishers, and also with birdwatchers, who come to see the local black-throated divers and greylag geese. At the southeast edge of the loch there is a small patch of coniferous forest.

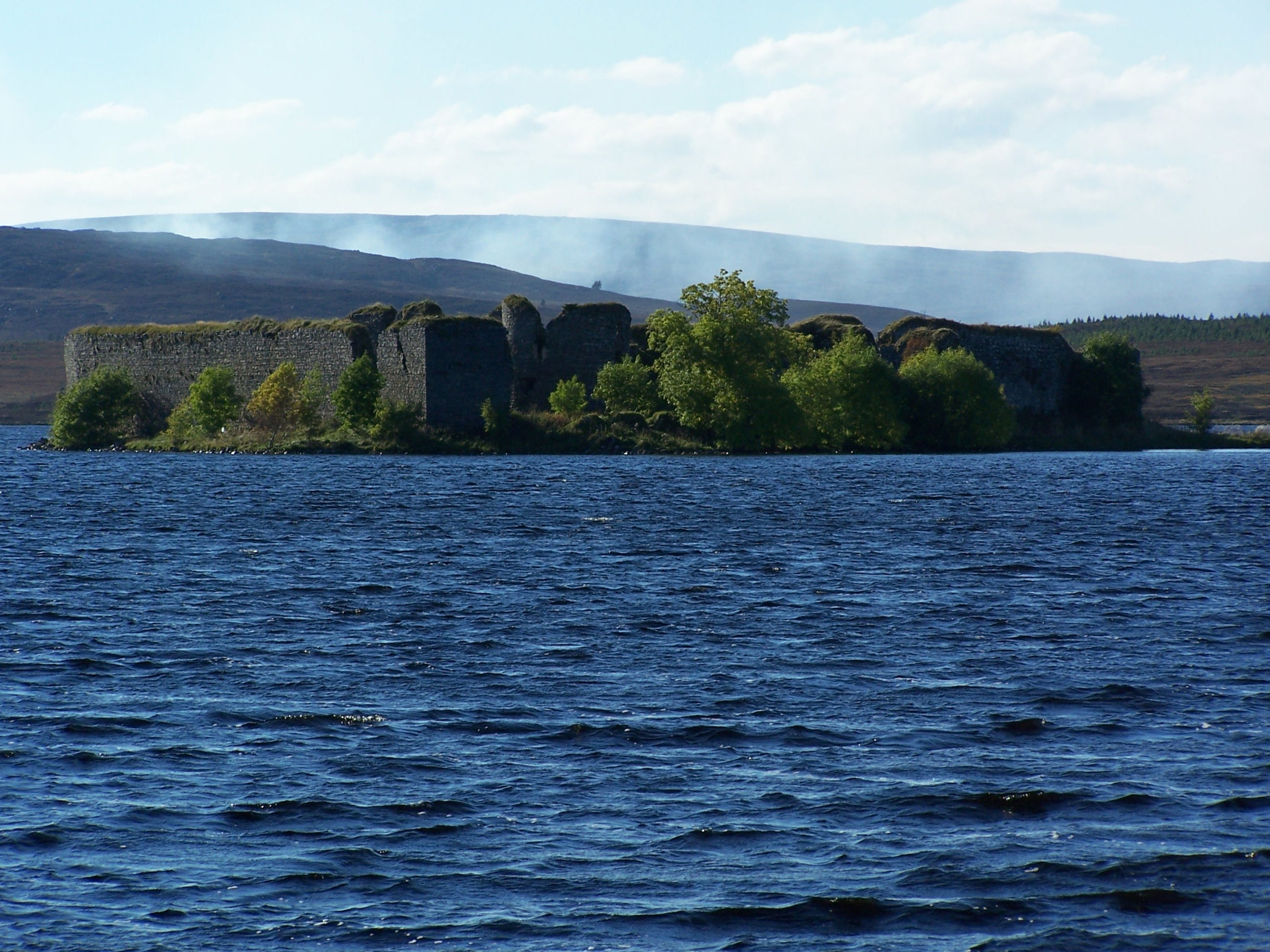
The "Wolf's Lair": Lochindorb Castle at Lochindorb in Badenoch, stronghold of Alexander Stewart, Earl of Buchan.

On 1 November 1573, Agnes Keith wrote to the laird of Kilravock asking him take order with tenants who were cutting down the woods of Lochindorb without permission.

== Wildlife ==
Lochindorb is home to an array of wildlife and is a popular fishing and birdwatching spot. The loch was traditionally a game loch. It used to have a large native population of brown trout, but their numbers have dramatically decreased. Introduced pike have been recorded there in recent years.
