= Leonard Gow =

Scottish shipowner, philanthropist and art collector

Leonard Gow (1859–1936) was a Scottish shipowner, philanthropist and art collector.

== Life ==
He was born in Glasgow the son of Jessie Mcleod and her husband Leonard Gow (1824-1910), a Glasgow shipping magnate in the firm Allan C. Gow & Co and founder of the Glen Line. Leonard studied Moral Philosophy at Glasgow University in 1884 but did not graduate. He entered his father's shipping business and was also a Director of Burmah Oil.

Gow became director of Allan C. Gow when his father retired and went into a partnership creating Gow, Harrison & Co.

He began collecting Impressionist art and Chinese and Japanese porcelain around 1880, using the art dealer Alexander Reid.

His father died on 25 November 1910. Also described as a "philanthropist" Some time between 1910 and 1915 he purchased "Camis Eskan" a huge mansionhouse near Helensburgh with enough wall space to display his growing art collection. In 1915 Gow employed the architect A. N. Paterson (1862-1947) to extend and modernise the mansion.

Glasgow University gave him an honorary doctorate in 1934.

He died on 11 March 1936. He is buried in the Glasgow Necropolis.

After his death a large exhibition of his collection was held at the Kelvingrove Art Gallery and Museum.

== Artistic recognition ==
Gow was portrayed by John Lavery.

== Endowments by Gow ==
- Leonard Gow Lectureship on Medical Diseases of Infancy and Childhood (founded 1919)
- 300 prints by Muirhead Bone donated to the Hunterian Art Gallery (1965 by his trustees)
- A huge section of his Chinese porcelain is now held as the Leonard Gow Collection in the Victoria and Albert Museum in London
- The remainder of his porcelain collection was purchased by Alfred Caspary in 1938 who passed 400 items to the Philadelphia Museum of Art as the "Margaret and Alfred Caspary Memorial Gift" in 1955.

== Family ==
He had two sons: Leonard Harper Gow (1891-1965) and John Wesley Harper Gow (1898-1986).
