= Freddy Gow =

Australian cricketer

Personal information
- Full name: Frederick Kingswood Gow
- Born: 18 December 1882; Richmond, New South Wales, Australia
- Died: 11 October 1961 (aged 78); Sydney, Australia
- Source: ESPNcricinfo, 30 December 2016

Freddy Gow (18 December 1882 – 11 October 1961) was an Australian cricketer. He played seven first-class matches for New South Wales between 1909/10 and 1910/11.

== See also ==
- List of New South Wales representative cricketers
