= James Gow (scholar) =

James Gow (1854–1923) was an English scholar, educator, historian, and author, widely recognized for A Short History of Greek Mathematics. The history drew highly upon the work of Moritz Cantor, as well as upon pioneering works of Carl Anton Bretschneider, Hermann Hankel, and George Johnston Allman, but included material, e.g., gematria, not discussed by contemporary historians of mathematics.

== Life ==
James Gow was the son of the artist James Gow (Sr.), who was a member of the Royal Society of British Artists. He married Gertrude Sydenham (the daughter of G. P. and M. A. Everett Green) with whom he had three sons.

Following an education at King's College School, he received his Master of Arts degree at Trinity College, Cambridge. Gow was a third Classic and Chancellor's Classical medalist in 1875 at Cambridge, and became a Fellow of Trinity College and of King's College, London in 1876. At Cambridge he earned Doctor of Letters in 1885 and served as University Extension Lecturer from 1876 to 1878. He was Barrister at Lincoln's Inn in 1875, President of the Headmaster's Association from 1900 to 1902, and Chairman of the Headmasters' Conference in 1906.

Gow was also Master of the Nottingham High School from 1885 to 1901, following which he became Headmaster of Westminster School. He also contributed articles to the 1911 Encyclopædia Britannica.

== Works ==
- (1884) A Short History of Greek Mathematics
- (1888) A Companion to School Classics
- (1895) Horace's Odes and Satires edited, with introduction and notes by James Gow
- (1907) A Method of English for Secondary Schools, Part 1
- "Horace" . Encyclopædia Britannica. Vol. 13 (11th ed.). 1911. pp. 687–691.
