= King Edward, Aberdeenshire =

Village in Scotland

Coordinates: 57°36′24″N 2°28′26″W

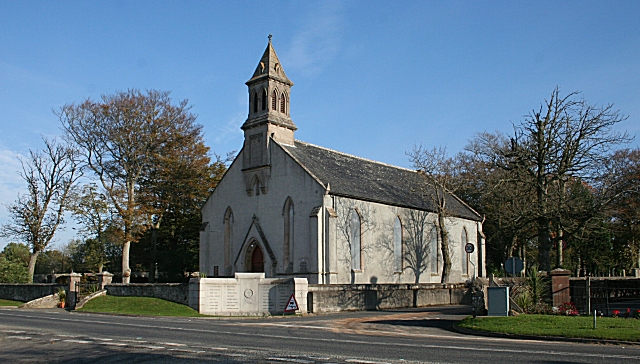
King Edward Parish Kirk

King Edward (Gaelic: Cinn Eadar) is a small village, parish and former feudal barony near the north coast of Scotland in Buchan, midway between Turriff and Banff.

The old church of King Edward with historic graveyard was founded around 1124 and dedicated to St Aidan. The last service in the old church was on 25 June 1848, after which services moved to new building alongside the main road.

The Castle of King Edward is a 13th-century ruined castle located approximately one mile south of the village where the A947 crosses the King Edward Burn.

King Edward station stood on the Banff, Macduff and Turriff Junction Railway part of the Great North of Scotland Railway system.

== Famous inhabitants ==
Probably the best known inhabitant was William Guild who was minister at the church from 1608 to 1631. Dr Guild went on to become principal at King's College, Aberdeen. Guild Street in Aberdeen is named after him.

== Etymology ==
The name itself has nothing to do with any "King Edward", but is a corruption of an earlier Scottish Gaelic name. The first element "King", usually appears as "kin" in Scottish placenames, and derives from "Ceann" meaning a headland. The second element is less certain but may derive from "Eadar" (between) or "cathair-thalmhainn" (yarrow).

The parish of King Edward has had approx 24 variations of the name: Kynedor (12th Century), Kynedward and Kinedart to name a few.
