= Portrait of James Macpherson =

Painting by George Romney

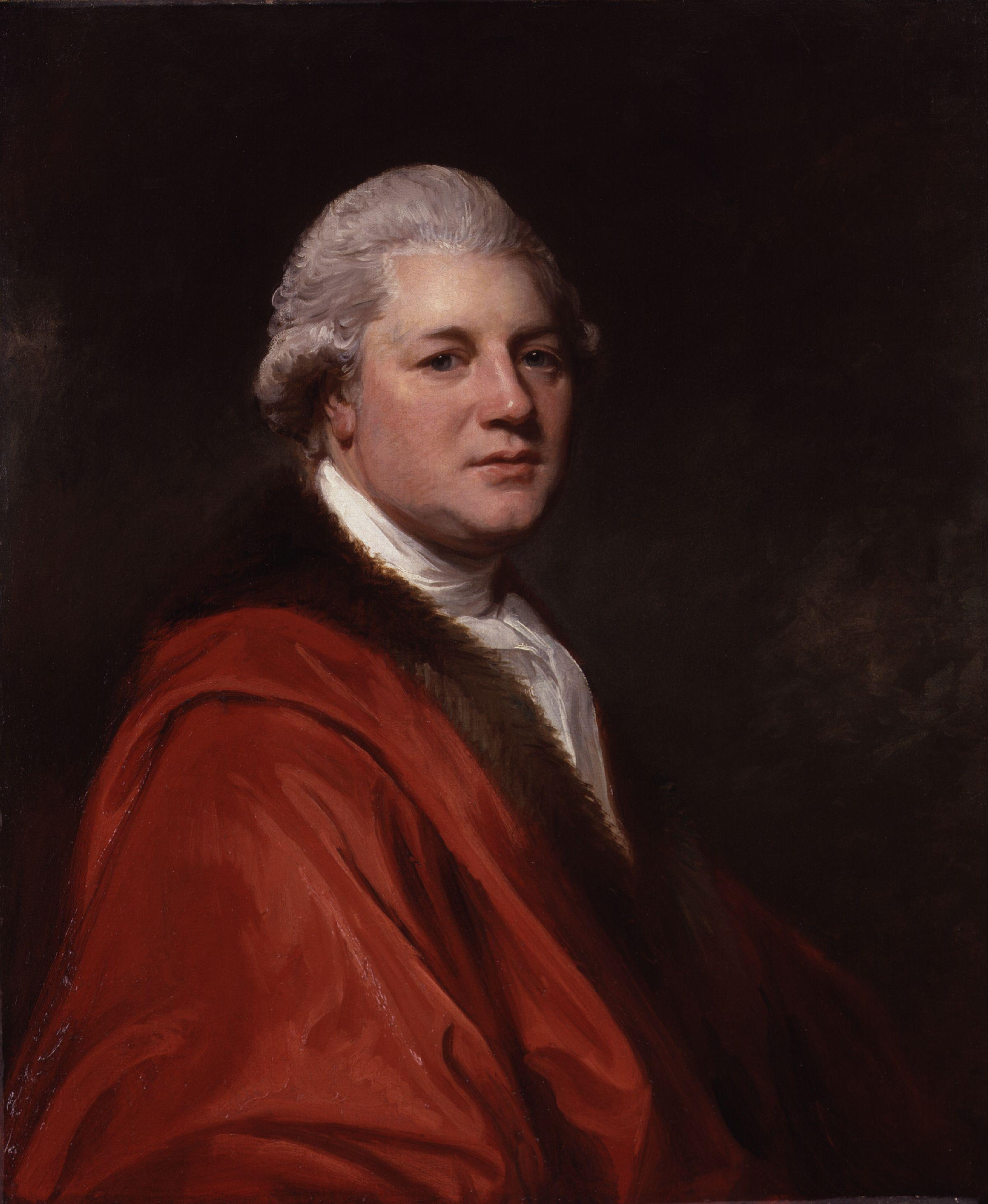
- Artist: George Romney
- Year: c.1780
- Type: Oil on canvas, portrait painting
- Dimensions: 75.9 cm × 63 cm (29.9 in × 25 in)
- Location: National Portrait Gallery; London

Portrait of James Macpherson is a 1780 portrait painting by the English artist George Romney. It depicts the Scottish writer and politician James Macpherson, shown at half-length by Romney who was leading portraitist of the Georgian era along with his rivals Gainsborough and Joshua Reynolds. Macpherson became best-known as the author of the Ossian cycle of poems. While extremely influential on the emerging Romantic movement, they became a source of controversy as he had false claimed that he had discovered and translated them from the original Gaelic rather than writing them himself. Macpherson was also the Whig Member of Parliament for Camelford from 1780 to 1796.

The painting is now in the collection of the National Portrait Gallery in London, which purchased it in 1985.

== Bibliography ==
- DeGategno, Paul J. James Macpherson. Twayne, 1989.
- Ingamells, John. National Portrait Gallery Mid-Georgian Portraits, 1760–1790. National Portrait Gallery, 2004.
