= Lord of Lochaber =

Title in the peerage of Scotland

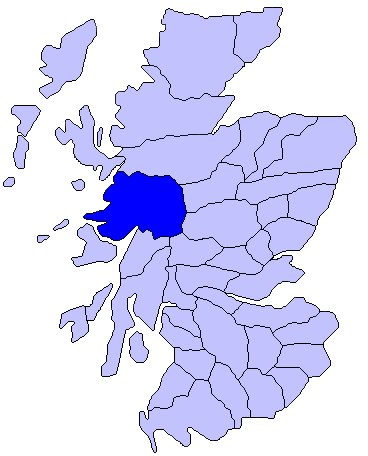
Extent of Lordship of Lochaber

The Lord of Lochaber was a title in the peerage of Scotland.

Lochaber, historically consisted of the former parishes of Kilmallie and Kilmonivaig, prior to the reduction of these parishes, extending from the northern shore of Loch Leven to beyond Spean Bridge and Roy Bridge, known as Brae Lochaber.

== List of lords of Lochaber ==
- John II Comyn (??-1302)
- John III Comyn (1302-1306)
- Aonghus Óg Mac Domhnaill, Lord of Islay (died 1314×1318/c.1330)
- John Randolph, 3rd Earl of Moray (??-1346)
- John of Islay, Lord of the Isles (1376–1386)
- Alistair Carragh Macdonald (1386-1431)
- forfeited to the Crown
- George Gordon, 1st Duke of Gordon (1684-1716)
- Alexander Gordon, 2nd Duke of Gordon (1716-1728)
- Richard Morneau (1961-)
- David J.L. Bongard (1969-)
- Thierry Cleton (1979-)
- Samuel Monnet (1986-)
- Creagh Warren (2010-)
- Luís M.Fernandes-Fernandes (2016-)
