= Nurabad, Manujan =

Nurabad نوراباد
- Village
- Location within Iran
- Coordinates: 27°03′41″N 57°51′06″E
- Country: Iran
- Province: Kerman
- County: Manujan
- Bakhsh: Central
- Rural District: Geshmiran

Population (2006)
  - Total: 296
- Time zone: UTC+3:30 (IRST)
  - Summer (DST): UTC+4:30 (IRDT)

Nurabad (Persian: نوراباد, also Romanized as Nūrābād; also known as Gow and Gūr) is a village in Geshmiran Rural District, in the Central District of Manujan County, Kerman Province, Iran. At the 2006 census, its population was 296, in 64 families.
