= Ruthven, Badenoch =

Coordinates: 57.070°N 4.043°W

Ruthven: Scottish Gaelic: Ruadhainn
- Location within the Badenoch and Strathspey area
- OS grid reference: NN761992
- Council area: Highland
- Country: Scotland
- Sovereign state: United Kingdom
- Post town: Insh
- Postcode district: PH21 1
- Police: Scotland
- Fire: Scottish
- Ambulance: Scottish

Ruthven (Scottish Gaelic: Ruadhainn) is a settlement in Badenoch, in the Highland council area, Scotland. It is about 3/4 mile (1.2 km) south of Kingussie, and 43 miles (69 km) to the south of Inverness, in the former county of Inverness-shire. The River Spey and the A9 main road run just to the north of the settlement. The B970 road links Ruthven to Kingussie, crossing the River Spey near The Dell, the home ground of shinty team Kingussie Camanachd.

The ruins of the 18th century Ruthven Barracks are nearby, on the site of the earlier Ruthven Castle. James Macpherson, the "translator" of the Ossian poems, was born here in 1736.

== See also ==
- Comyn's Road
