= Ruthven Barracks =

1719 barracks in Highland, Scotland, UK

- Ruthven
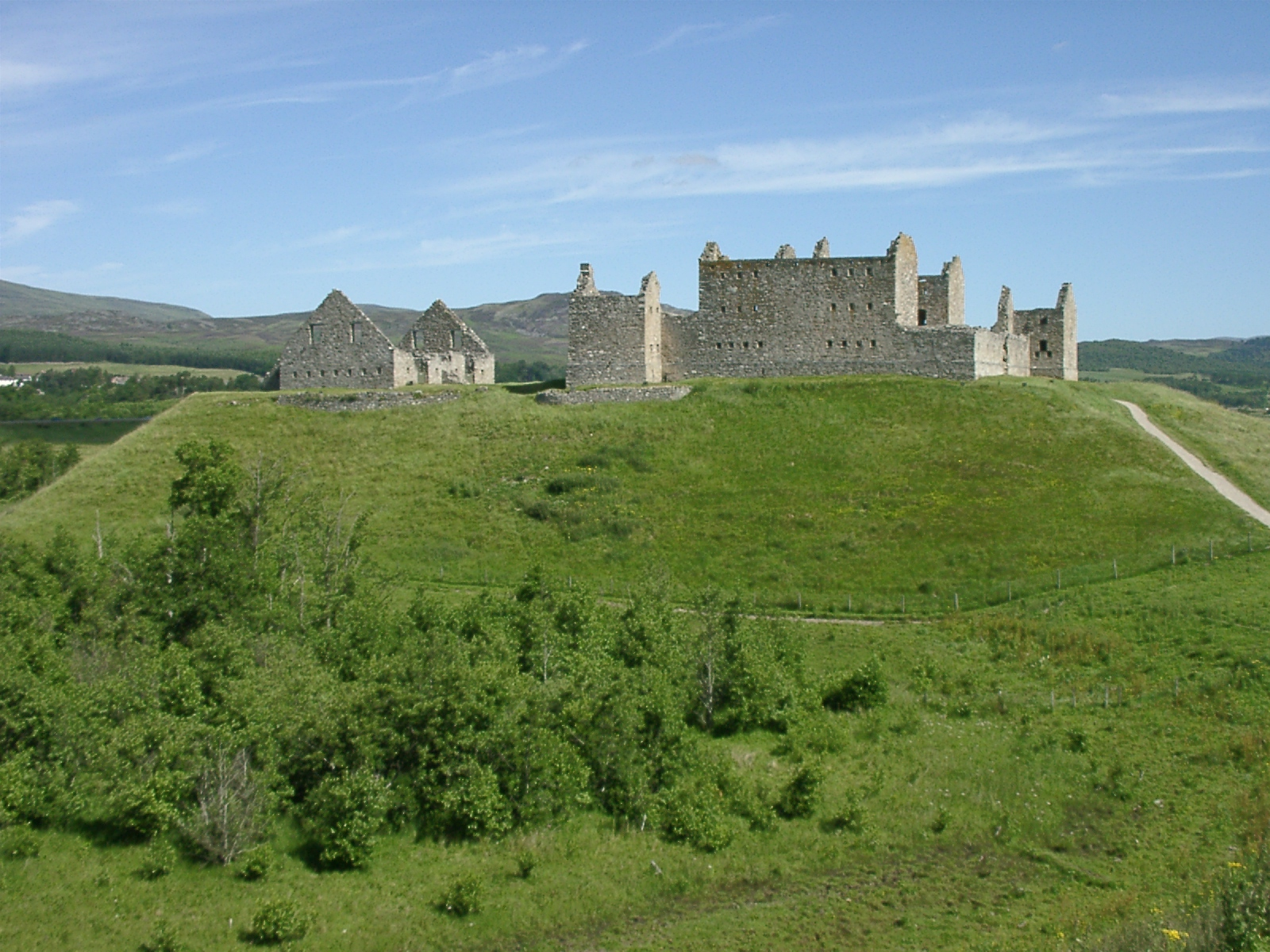
- Ruthven Barracks

Site information
- Type: Barracks
- Operator: British Army

Location
- Location within Badenoch and Strathspey
- Coordinates: 57°04′20″N 04°2′22″W

Site history
- Built: 1229
- In use: 1229–1746

Ruthven Barracks (/ˈrɪvən/), near Ruthven in Badenoch, Scotland, are the best preserved of the four barracks built in 1719 after the 1715 Jacobite rising. Set on an old castle mound, the complex comprises two large three-storey blocks occupying two sides of the enclosure, each with two rooms per floor. The barracks and enclosing walls were built with loopholes for musket firing, and bastion towers were built at opposite corners. Destroyed by Jacobites following their retreat after the Battle of Culloden in 1746, the Barracks ruins are maintained as a scheduled monument by Historic Environment Scotland. They are accessible at all times without entrance charge.

== History ==
=== First and second castles ===
The first castle (fortified structure) was built on the hilltop site in 1229, possibly by the Comyns. During the 13th century the castle was held by the Lords of Badenoch, chiefs of Clan Comyn. It was used as a base by Alexander Stewart, Earl of Buchan who was known as the "Wolf of Badenoch", the younger son of King Robert II of Scotland. The first castle at Ruthven was demolished in 1451 by John of Islay, Earl of Ross. It was replaced with a second castle, completed in 1459.

From the 15th to 16th century, the castle was held by the Earls of Huntly, chiefs of Clan Gordon, who were then the feudal superiors and lords of Badenoch. Mary, Queen of Scots visited in August 1564. New locks were bought for the castle and a cannon called a bombard was transported from Edinburgh. The castle was contested during the Wars of the Three Kingdoms and later John Graham, 1st Viscount Dundee, attacked the castle and severely damaged it during the Jacobite rising of 1689.

=== Jacobite risings ===
Due to continued unrest, the British government decided to build fortified barracks in strategic locations: the new barracks at Ruthven were completed in 1721 on the castle hilltop. The barracks accommodated 120 troops and 28 horses for dragoons. In August 1745, a unit of 12 soldiers, commanded by a Sergeant Terrence Molloy of the 6th Regiment of Foot, successfully defended the barracks against 200 Jacobites, losing one man killed, whilst killing at least two Jacobites and wounding many more. The following year Molloy, still in command of the barracks and having been promoted to the rank of lieutenant, surrendered to a larger force of Jacobites, with two cannons, commanded by John Gordon of Glenbucket.

The day after the Battle of Culloden in 1746, some 1,500 Jacobites retreated to Fort Ruthven, regrouped and waited for word from Charles Edward Stuart. His message for them arrived on 20 April, in which he stated "let every man seek his own safety in the best way he can", as their situation was hopeless. The departing Jacobites destroyed the barracks on 17 April 1746. The ruins remain.
