= Francisco de Miranda Municipality =

Francisco de Miranda Municipality may refer to the following places in Venezuela:

- Francisco de Miranda Municipality, Anzoátegui
- Francisco de Miranda Municipality, Guárico
- Francisco de Miranda Municipality, Táchira

== See also ==
- Miranda Municipality (disambiguation)
- Miranda (disambiguation)
- Francisco de Miranda, a Venezuelan military leader and revolutionary, and the namesake of the municipalities
