= Second Triumvirate (Venezuela) =

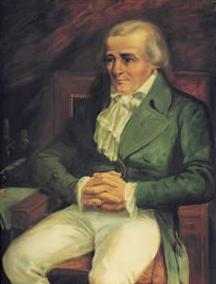
Juan Germán Roscio served as a member of the Triumvirate as the substitute for Francisco Javier Ustáriz.

The Second Triumvirate was the second government of the First Republic of Venezuela. Due to the names of its members, it was popularly known as the "government of the Franciscos." Established in the context of the Venezuelan War of Independence, it succeeded the First Triumvirate and granted dictatorial powers to Francisco de Miranda, after which the First Republic collapsed.

== Background ==
On March 16, 1811, the First National Congress of Venezuela resumed its sessions in Valencia, and on March 21, it appointed Francisco Espejo, Fernando Rodríguez del Toro, and Francisco Javier Ustáriz as presidents.

== History ==
The Executive Triumvirate was appointed by the First National Congress. Although it was supposed to be composed of Francisco Espejo, Fernando Rodríguez del Toro, and Francisco Javier Ustáriz, only the first was able to take office alongside the substitutes for the latter two, Francisco Javier Mayz and Juan Germán Roscio.

The Second Triumvirate was the first constitutional government of the Republic and existed from March 21 to July 25, 1812. It was marked by the earthquake that year.

== Aftermath ==
Francisco Espejo and Francisco Javier Ustáriz were arrested following the fall of the First Republic in 1812, and were released the following year by Simón Bolívar after the Admirable Campaign. However, both died in 1814: Espejo was executed by order of José Tomás Boves, and Ustáriz was wounded after losing the Battle of Urica. Fernando Rodríguez del Toro, for his part, escaped into exile in Trinidad until 1821.

== See also ==
- First Triumvirate
- Dictatorship of Francisco de Miranda
