= Miranda Municipality, Carabobo =

Miranda Municipality Municipio Miranda
- Municipality
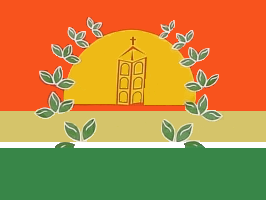
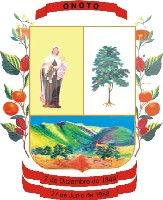
- Flag Coat of arms

- Location in Carabobo

- Location in Venezuela
- Coordinates: 10°06′37″N 68°22′45″W
- Country: Venezuela
- State: Carabobo
- Municipal seat: Miranda

Government
  - Mayor: Nerio Rico León (PSUV)

Area
  - Total: 150.8 km^{2} (58.2 sq mi)

Population (2011)
  - Total: 29,092
  - Density: 192.9/km^{2} (499.7/sq mi)
- Time zone: UTC−4 (VET)
- Area code(s): 0249
- Website: Official website

Miranda is one of the 14 municipalities (municipios) that makes up the Venezuelan state of Carabobo and, according to the 2011 census by the National Institute of Statistics of Venezuela, the municipality has a population of 29,092. The town of Miranda is the shire town of the Miranda Municipality.

== Name ==
The municipality is one of several in Venezuela named Miranda Municipality for independence hero Francisco de Miranda.

== Demographics ==
The Miranda Municipality, according to a 2007 population estimate by the National Institute of Statistics of Venezuela, has a population of 27,609 (up from 23,869 in 2000). This amounts to 1.2% of the state's population. The municipality's population density is 171.48 inhabitants per square kilometre (444.1/sq mi).

== Government ==
The mayor of the Miranda Municipality is Eduardo A. Sequera. He replaced Fernando Jimenez shortly after the last municipal elections. The municipality is divided into one parish (Miranda).
