= Dictatorship of Francisco de Miranda =

1812 government in Venezuela

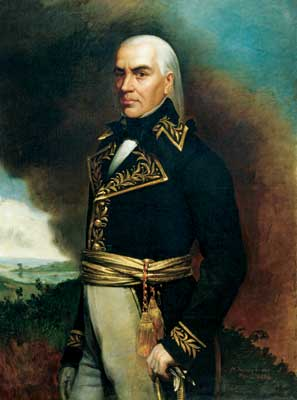
Francisco de Miranda by Tovar y Tovar

The dictatorship of Francisco de Miranda (1812) was the third and final government of the First Republic of Venezuela. It succeeded the Second Triumvirate in 1812 during the Venezuelan War of Independence. Miranda, then a deputy, was appointed Dictator Plenipotentiary and Supreme Chief by the First National Congress of Venezuela as its final act before dissolving amidst severe national instability.

The government began shortly after the 1812 Caracas earthquake. It lasted nearly two months, and following Miranda's capitulation to the Spanish Empire, the First Republic collapsed. Miranda attempted to flee but was captured by Simón Bolívar and other subordinate officers, who handed him over to Domingo de Monteverde. Miranda was subsequently imprisoned in Spain, where he died.

== Background ==
In 1811, a constituent assembly was established in Venezuela to reform the state. According to historian Alejandra Martínez Cánchica, "For the First Venezuelan Republic, between 1811 and 1812, the republican patriots in Venezuela still felt a certain misgiving towards a centralized political system that could derive into absolutist despotism. Therefore, in the Federal Constitution of 1811, they created a series of checks on executive power through a triumvirate that would alternate in power." Miranda subscribed to this constitution with reservations, as he did not consider it adequate for a nascent republic.

On March 26, 1812, a major earthquake struck. José Sata y Bussy, the Secretary of War, sent a letter to Generalissimo Miranda, which stated:

The Executive Power of the Union has just appointed you commander-in-chief of the armies of the entire Venezuelan Confederation with absolute faculties to take whatever measures you deem necessary to save our territory, invaded by the enemies of Colombian liberty; and under this concept, you are not subject to any law or regulation that has governed these republics until now, but on the contrary, you will consult nothing but the supreme law of saving the fatherland; and to this effect, the Power of the Union delegates to you its natural faculties and the extraordinary ones conferred upon it by the national representation by decree of the 4th of this month, under your responsibility.

I communicate this to you by order of the Executive Power for your understanding and compliance.

Caracas, April 23, 1812, Year II of the Republic.

Upon his appointment, Deputy Francisco de Miranda declared:

"I am to preside over the funeral of Venezuela."

However, on May 21 of that year, Miranda assured the governments of the provinces and the rest of the country that:

"I will never abandon the important post in which you have placed me, without satisfying your confidence and your desires."

== Domestic policy ==
=== Judicial policy ===
Miranda's government was the last to operate under the 1811 constitution. The Archbishop of Caracas, Narciso Coll y Prat, maintained a public confrontation with the government and the War of Independence, claiming the March 26, 1812 earthquake was a divine punishment; Coll y Prat was arrested and his message censored.

=== Defense and recruitment ===
Miranda's announced governmental national project was:

"The result must be the organization and complement of a republican army, the destruction of our enemies, the reunion of the dissident Provinces under the standard of liberty, and lastly, peace and friendship among all the Peoples of Venezuela, who shall form but one single and unique family."

In May 1812, Miranda sent commissioners to the Caribbean islands to recruit combatants, offering them Venezuelan citizenship after participating in one or several campaigns and rewarding them with land according to their merits and services.

On June 19, 1812, General Miranda decreed martial law, requiring all men between 15 and 55 years old to enlist; those who resisted were to be considered traitors and judged. He also requested the incorporation of a thousand enslaved people into his army, offering them freedom after four years of service and distinguished combat actions. This offer caused rejection not only among the royalists but also among some republicans who viewed the incorporation of enslaved people unfavorably. Several main promoters of the independence movement were owners of large estates whose primary labor force was enslaved people. Furthermore, the fear of a repeat of the Haitian Revolution in Venezuela led some leaders to discourage the incorporation of the enslaved into the conflict.

=== Economy ===
Miranda considered one of his government's priorities to be correcting the "absolute disorder in which our system of revenue was found and the discredit of our paper money," announcing plans to build banks "that credit and give circulation to the national currency."

== Foreign policy ==
Miranda planned to "expressly treat with foreign nations, and those of free America, so that through contracts or other negotiations, the Republic may be provided with arms, troops, and munitions to ensure its liberty and independence."

=== Monteverde's Reconquest Campaign ===
The Campaign of Reconquest of Monteverde were a series of military actions between February and July 1812, in which the Spanish military commander Domingo de Monteverde led the royalist army to subdue the Venezuelan provinces that had declared independence from Spain. The campaign recovered the central and western parts of the country and led to the fall of the First Republic of Venezuela.

==== Capitulation of San Mateo ====
The Capitulation of San Mateo consisted of the cessation of hostilities between Spain and the First Republic of Venezuela and the surrender of the general of the independence forces, Francisco de Miranda, to the royalist commander, Domingo de Monteverde, on July 25, 1812. The capitulation occurred after the republicans lost Puerto Cabello.

Miranda was given a thousand ounces of gold to go to England.

== Arrest and imprisonment ==
By July 29, 1812, the takeover of Caracas by Domingo de Monteverde was inevitable, so Miranda headed to La Guaira to escape. He ordered his aide-de-camp and secretary, Pedro Antonio Leleux, to ship his archive and books to Curaçao. The captain of the ship that was to take Miranda proposed leaving immediately, but Miranda preferred to spend the night and leave at dawn. According to witnesses, Miranda had plans to retake Caracas from New Granada (modern Colombia), where he had friends. The historian Parra-Pérez wrote in History of the First Republic of Venezuela that Miranda arrived in La Guaira on July 30 at seven in the evening and stayed at the house of the military commander of the area, Manuel María de las Casas.

Miranda's capitulation to the Spanish Empire was poorly received by his subordinate, the military commander of Puerto Cabello, Simón Bolívar, who later claimed he could not sleep for twelve days, considering the events a betrayal. Bolívar organized Miranda's arrest with other young officers as Miranda was preparing to leave the country; Bolívar allegedly intended to have the Generalissimo shot. According to Parra-Pérez, those involved in the secret plot included Manuel María de las Casas, Dr. Miguel Peña, commanders Tomás Montilla, Rafael Chatillón, José Landaeta, Juan José Valdés, and colonels Juan Paz del Castillo, José Mires, Manuel Cortés Campomanes, and Simón Bolívar.

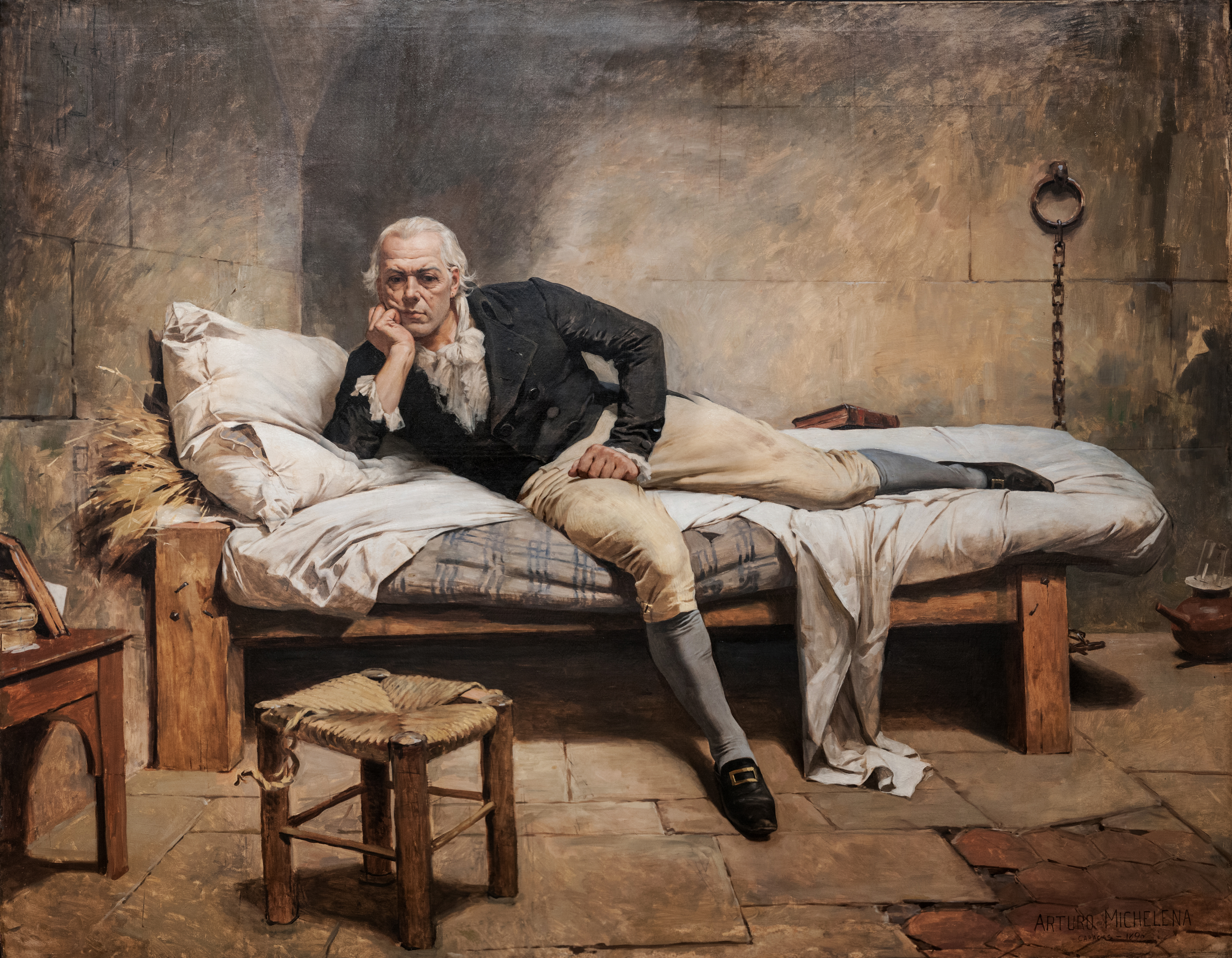
Miranda in the Arsenal de La Carraca, by Arturo Michelena

In the early hours of July 31, Miranda was asleep when Bolívar, Chatillón, and Montilla burst into his room. The Generalissimo asked his assistant, Carlos Soublette, for a lantern and illuminated the faces of his captors. One version states Miranda said nothing, but tradition holds that he exclaimed:

"Bochinche, bochinche, these people don't know how to do anything but cause bochinche!"

Simón Bolívar, Tomás Montilla, José Mires, Miguel Carabaño, and Carlos Soublette took him prisoner to San Carlos Castle in La Guaira. Following Monteverde's instructions, De las Casas handed Miranda over to Francisco Javier Cervériz, who personally placed him in his cell in the castle.

In exchange for handing over Miranda, Domingo de Monteverde pardoned his past insurgency to Miranda's captors: Bolívar, Chatillón, and Montilla. Miranda was taken to El Morro fortress in Puerto Rico and from there imprisoned in 1813 in the Arsenal de La Carraca in Spain, where he would die in exile. His remains were never found.

== See also ==
- First Republic of Venezuela
- Second Triumvirate
