= Miranda Municipality, Mérida =

Miranda Municipality Municipio Miranda
- Municipality
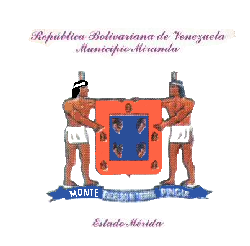
- Flag Coat of arms

- Location in Mérida

- Location in Venezuela
- Coordinates: 8°58′58″N 70°46′48″W
- Country: Venezuela
- State: Mérida

Government
  - Mayor: José Concepción Rivera (PSUV)

Area
  - Total: 430 km^{2} (170 sq mi)

Population (2007)
  - Total: 22,879
  - Density: 53/km^{2} (140/sq mi)
- Time zone: UTC−4 (VET)
- Area code(s): 0271
- Website: Official website

Miranda is one of the 23 municipalities (municipios) that makes up the Venezuelan state of Mérida and, according to a 2007 population estimate by the National Institute of Statistics of Venezuela, the municipality has a population of 22,879. The town of Timotes is the shire town of the Miranda Municipality. The municipality is one of several in Venezuela named Miranda Municipality after the Venezuelan revolutionary and independence hero Francisco de Miranda.

== See also ==
- Timotes
- Mérida
- Municipalities of Venezuela
