= First Triumvirate (Venezuela) =

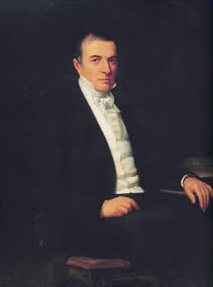
Cristóbal Mendoza, member of the First Triumvirate

The First Triumvirate (1811–1812) was appointed by the First National Congress of Venezuela as the provisional government of the First Republic of Venezuela. Composed of Cristóbal Mendoza, Juan Escalona, and Baltasar Padrón, its members rotated the presidency on a weekly basis. It was succeeded by the Second Triumvirate.

This government declared Venezuela's independence from the Spanish Empire and promulgated the country's first constitution in 1811, officially naming the nation "Confederación Americana de Venezuela".

== Background ==
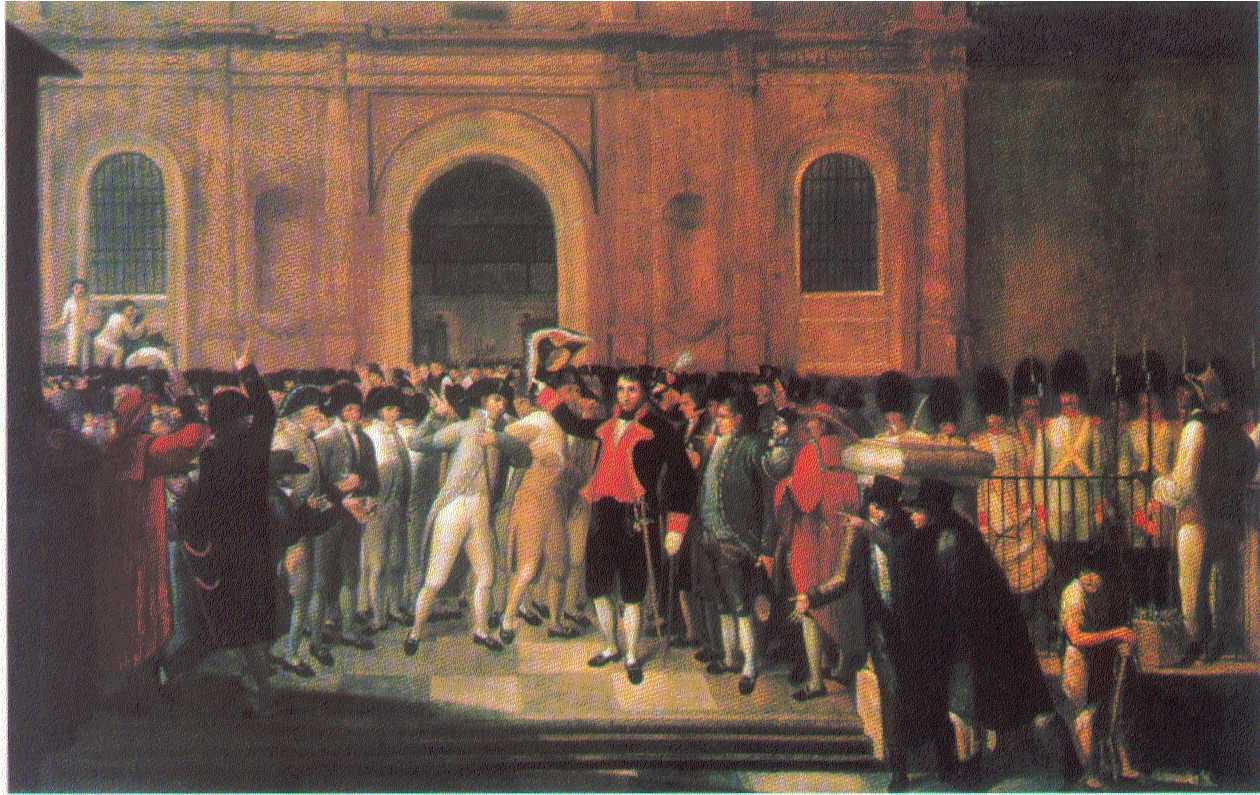
Revolution of April 19, 1810

During the Napoleonic Wars in Europe, the Spanish Crown had been seized by Napoleon Bonaparte, who installed his brother as monarch. This triggered the 19 April 1810 Revolution, in which the people of Caracas rejected allegiance to the First French Empire.

The Junta Suprema de Caracas organized elections across seven provinces to select representatives for the First National Congress of Venezuela, which replaced the Junta. On 2 March 1811, the Congress established an executive triumvirate, appointing Mendoza, Escalona, and Padrón as joint leaders.

== Domestic policy ==
=== Legislative policy ===
The Triumvirate formalized Venezuela's independence from Spain and enacted the 1811 Constitution, renaming the country the "American Confederation of Venezuela".

== Opposition ==
=== Sabana del Teque Uprising ===
The Sabana del Teque Uprising occurred on 11 July 1811, just six days after the Declaration of Independence. Approximately 60 Canary Islanders rebelled, shouting royalist slogans such as "Long live the King and the Virgin of Rosary!" and "Death to the traitors!".

== See also ==
- Venezuelan Declaration of Independence
- Second Triumvirate (Venezuela)
