= Miranda, Carabobo =

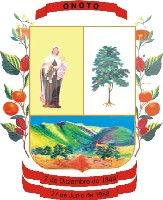
- Coat of arms

- Coordinates: 10°9′24.9″N 68°18′36.28″W

Miranda is the central town of Miranda Municipality, Carabobo.
