= Francisco de Miranda Municipality, Táchira =

Municipality in Táchira, Venezuela

Francisco de Miranda Municipality Municipio Francisco de Miranda
- Municipality
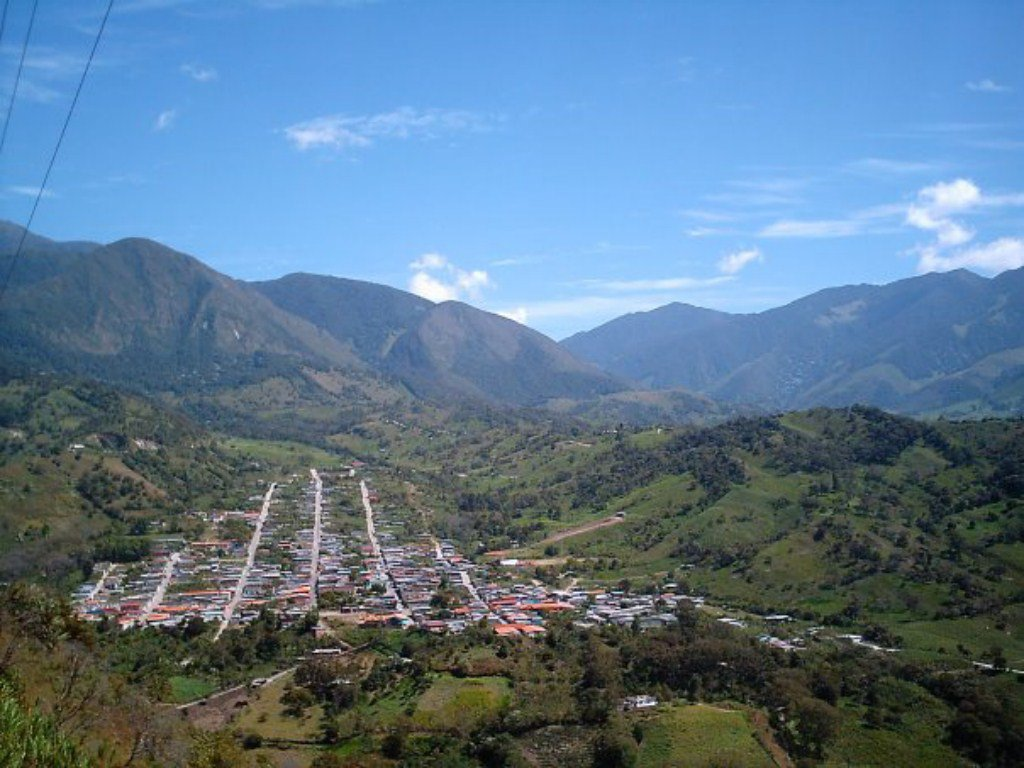

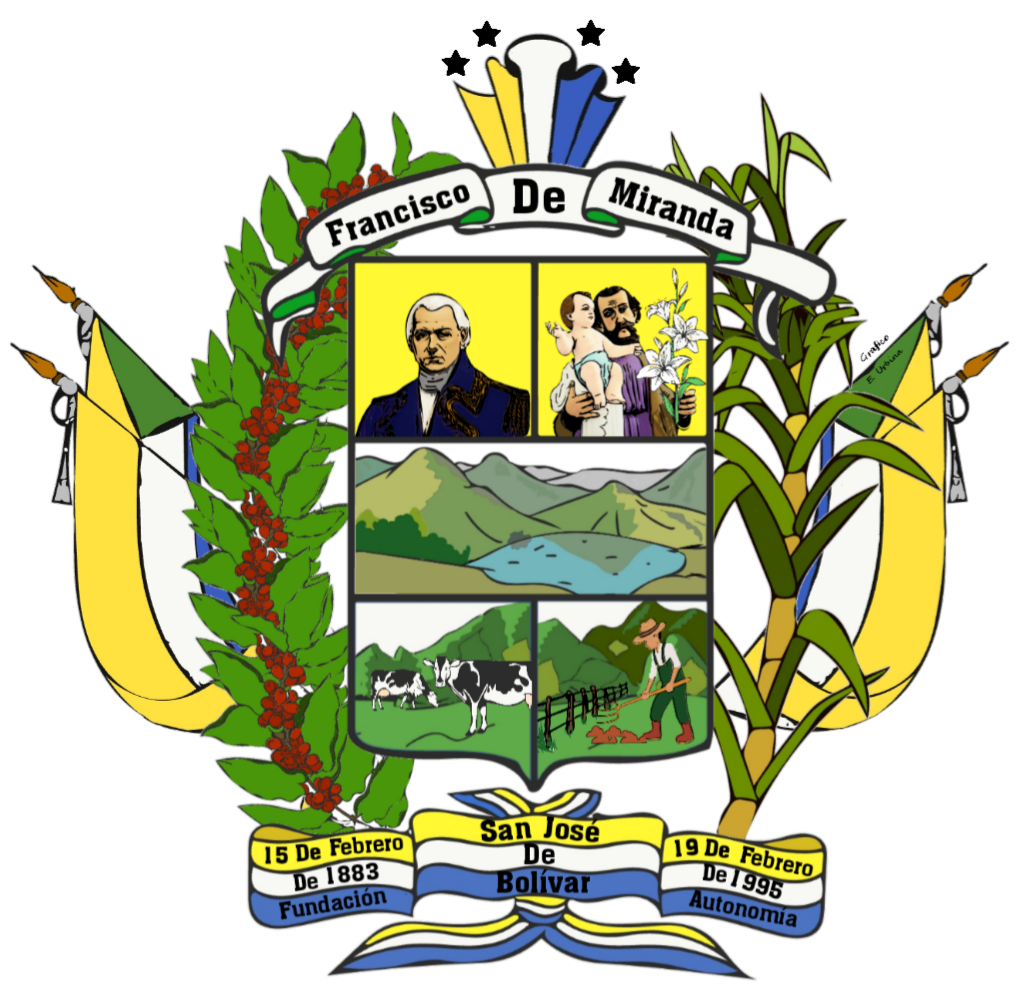
- Flag Seal

- Location in Táchira

- Location in Venezuela
- Country: Venezuela
- State: Táchira
- Founded: 1994
- Municipal seat: San José de Bolívar

Government
  - Mayor: Omar Rojas (COPEI)

Area
  - Total: 257.7 km^{2} (99.5 sq mi)

Population (2018)
  - Total: 5,673
  - Density: 22.01/km^{2} (57.02/sq mi)
- Time zone: UTC−4 (VET)

Francisco de Miranda Municipality is one of the 29 municipalities in Táchira state, Venezuela. The municipality has a total surface of 262 km^{2} and it has some 5,673 inhabitants (2018 census). Its capital is San José de Bolívar.
