= Arsenal de La Carraca =

Naval shipyard and naval base in San Fernando, Spain

Coordinates: 36°29′45″N 6°10′38″W

La Carraca Naval Station
- Arsenal de La Carraca
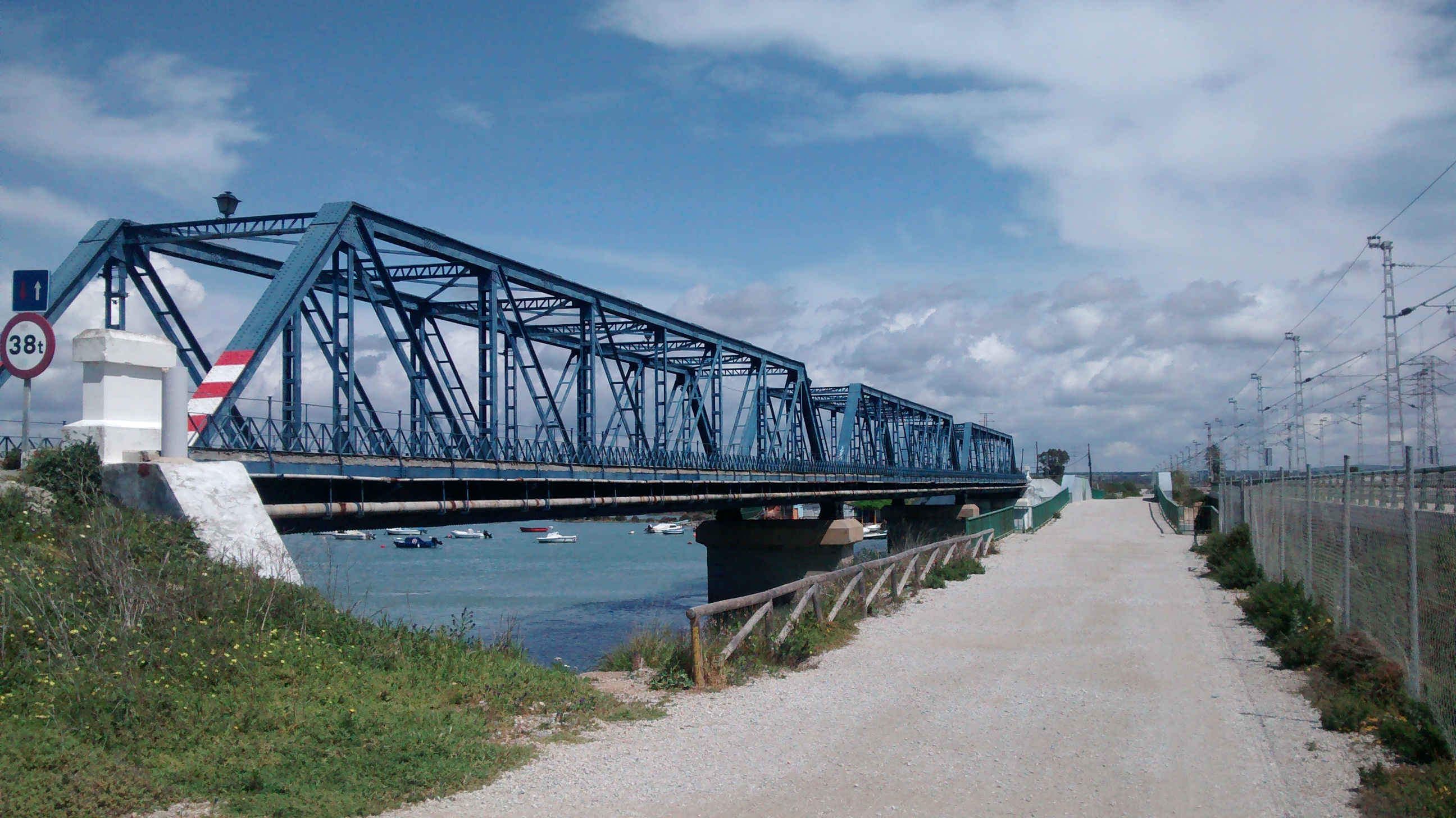

Site information
- Type: Military base
- Owner: Spain
- Controlled by: Spanish Navy

Site history
- Built: 1752
- Built by: Jorge Juan y Santacilla; Antonio Valdes

Garrison information
- Current commander: Rear admiral Alfonso Gómez Fernández de Córdoba
- Occupants: See Ships

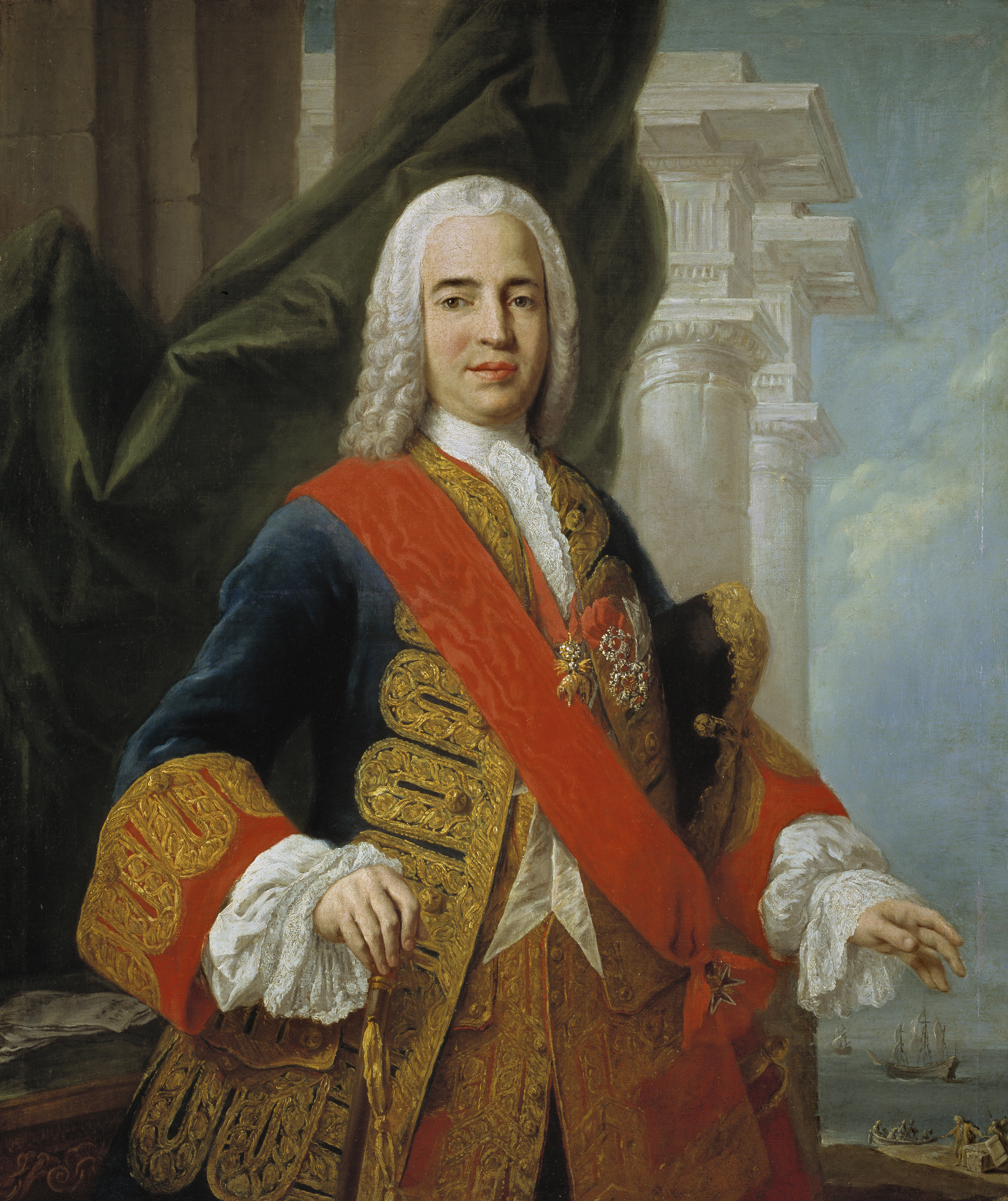
Established on the decree of Felipe V by Marquis de la Ensenada

Arsenal de La Carraca, also Naval Station of La Carraca, is a naval shipyard and a naval base in San Fernando, Spain. It is a naval base for the construction and repair of ships, and the storage and distribution of arms and ammunition. The first military establishment of its kind to be created in Spain under the naval policy of Felipe V, it was developed by Patiño and the Marquis de la Ensenada. Though work on building the shipyard began in 1720, the formal decree issued by Fernando VI on October 3, 1752, accelerated its construction until it was completed in the late 18th century.

== Geography ==
The arsenal is situated in the Bay of Cádiz, 2 miles (3.2 km) south of Puerto Real ("royal port") and 5.5 miles (9 km) southeast of Cádiz. It is within the San Fernando municipality in the province of Cádiz. The location, chosen for its strategic qualities, was at one time a small island northeast of Isla de León, separated by the narrow continuation of the Puntal Channel (or Puntales). Surrounded by navigation channels, the royal dockyard and arsenal measures 3,600 by 1,800 feet (1,100 m × 550 m). The channel in front of the dockyard is 2 fathoms deep at low water.

== History ==
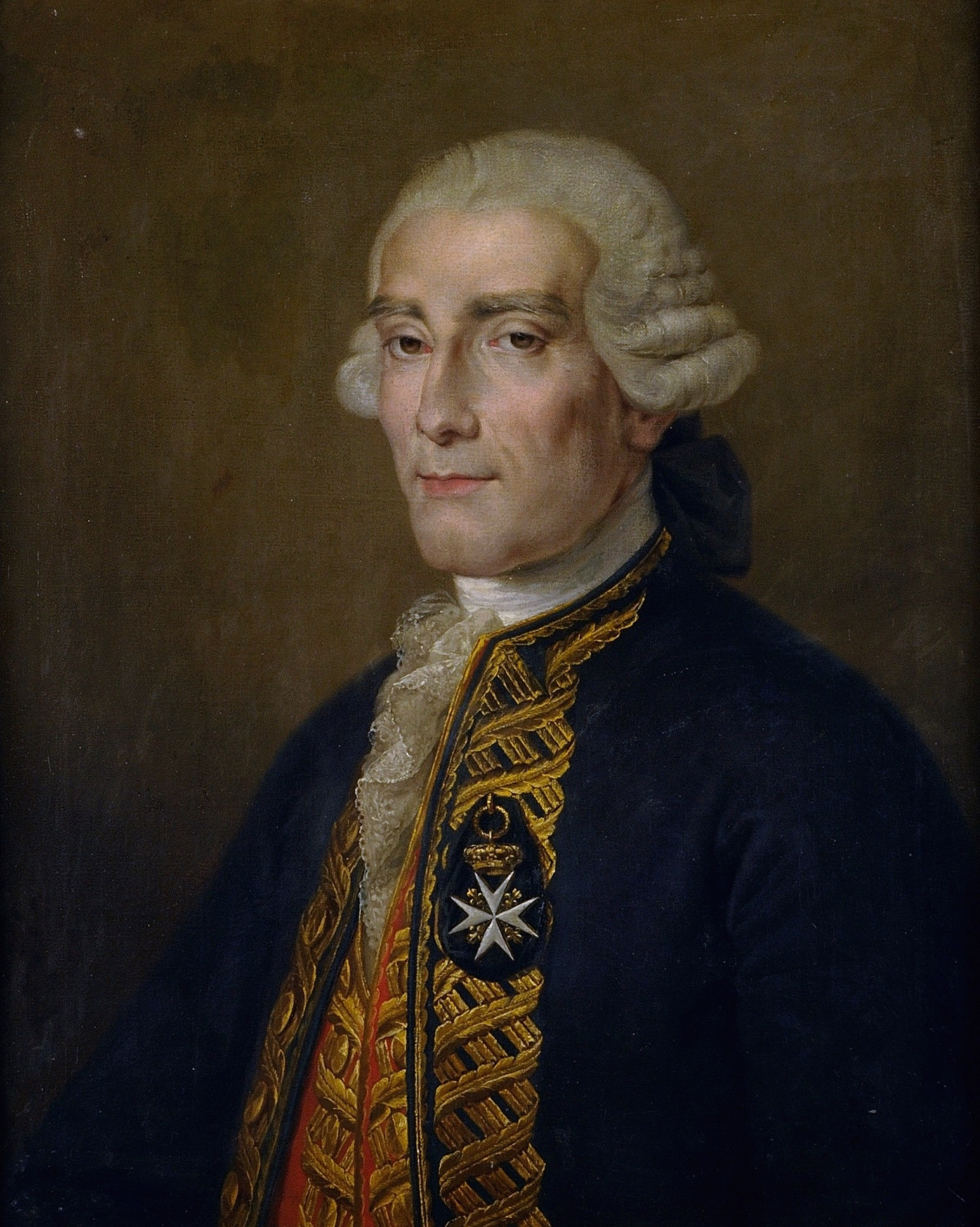
Jorge Juan y Santacilia who planned the development

The island was used for Spanish naval operations from 1655. The arsenal was established early on around the wreck of an old carrack which gave name to the arsenal. Under royal decree of Fernando VI in 1752, formal authorization was given for the construction of a naval shipyard. Antonio Valdés completed the yard during the reigns of Carlos III and Carlos IV. With its docks and workshops, it was the first naval construction centre to be built in Spain. As a result, San Fernando developed as an urban centre, some of its old buildings still standing today.

Even before the formal decree was issued, construction work started around 1720, and by 1733 the main entrance to the San Fernando quay was built. Shipbuilding activities commenced in 1736. By the end of first half of the 18th century, docks, warehouses, offices, workshops and homes had been built. Even though Jorge Juan together with José Barnola drew up detailed plans for developing the port after the royal decree, it was only in 1788 that the three dry docks were completed by Julián Sánchez Bort and Tomás Muñoz. By the late 18th century, the Penal de las Cuatro Torres prison, the barracks and the munitions factories were built. A church (Nueva Iglesia) and the Puerta de Tierra beside the Caño Sancti Petri were added in the Neoclassical style.

The naval complex had facilities for ship building, equipping, and repair. In addition to the docks built between 1784 and 1788, one more was added in the 19th century, all remaining in operation until recent years. In the development of submarines, use was made of the facilities at the Arsenal de la Carraca when the Peral, driven by electric motors, was built in 1887.

== Architecture and fittings ==
The arsenal's urban plan included the four docks, a patent slip, building slips, the Carrack Church, the Prison of the Four Towers (where Francisco de Miranda was imprisoned and died in 1816), workshops, dams and docks. The three defensive batteries of San Fernando, San Ramon Battery, and Santa Rosa, were each equipped with 11 guns.

== Ships ==
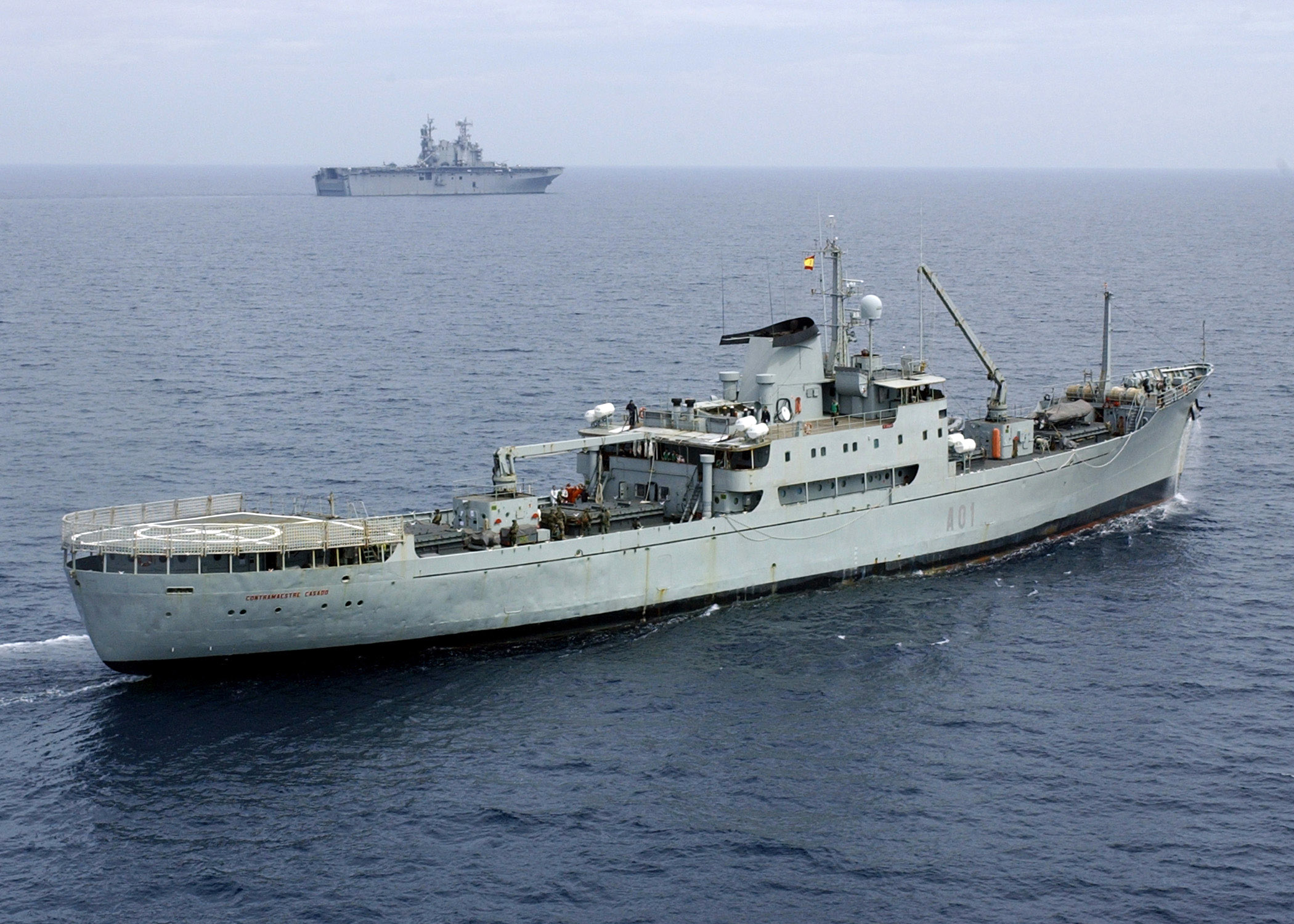
ESPN Contramaestre Casado (A-01)

- Transport ships.
  - Contramaestre Casado (A-01)
- Training ships.
  - Juan Sebastián Elcano (A-71)

== See also ==
- Spanish Navy
- San Fernando, Spain
- Bay of Cádiz
- Peral Submarine
- Penal de las Cuatro Torres
