= Francisco de Miranda =

Venezuelan military leader (1750–1816)

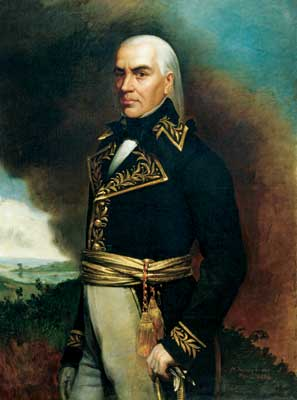
- Portrait by Martín Tovar y Tovar, 1874

Supreme Chief of Venezuela
- In office 25 April 1812 – 26 June 1812
- Preceded by: Francisco Espejo
- Succeeded by: Simón Bolívar (As President of the Second Republic of Venezuela)

Personal details
- Born: Sebastián Francisco de Miranda y Rodríguez de Espinoza; 28 March 1750 Caracas, Venezuela Province, Viceroyalty of New Granada, Spanish Empire
- Died: 14 July 1816 (aged 66) Cádiz, Spain
- Profession: Military
- Known for: As creator of the name of Colombia
- Nickname(s): The Precursor; The First Universal Venezuelan; The Great Universal American

Military service
- Allegiance: Kingdom of Spain; French First Republic; First Republic of Venezuela
- Years of service: 1773–1783; 1791–1793; 1811–1812
- Rank: Generalissimo
- Battles/wars: Conflicts: Siege of Melilla (1774); American Revolutionary War; Siege of Pensacola; French Revolutionary War; Battle of Valmy; Spanish American wars of independence; Francisco de Miranda's Expedition; Venezuelan War of Independence; Valencia Campaign; Monteverde Reconquest Campaign; Battle of Valencia (1812); Battle of La Victoria (1812)

Sebastián Francisco de Miranda y Rodríguez de Espinoza (28 March 1750 – 14 July 1816), commonly known as Francisco de Miranda (Latin American Spanish: [fɾanˈsisko ðe miˈɾanda]), was a Venezuelan military leader and revolutionary who fought in the American Revolutionary War, the French Revolution and the Spanish American wars of independence. He is regarded as a precursor of South America's liberation from the Spanish Empire, and remains known as the "First Universal Venezuelan" and the "Great Universal American".

Born in Caracas in the Viceroyalty of New Granada into a wealthy family, Miranda left to pursue an education in Madrid in 1771 and subsequently enlisted in the Spanish army. In 1780, following Spain's entry into the American Revolutionary War, he was sent to Cuba and fought the British at Pensacola. Accused of espionage and smuggling, he fled to the United States in 1783. Miranda returned to Europe in 1785 and travelled through the continent, gradually formulating his plans for Spanish American independence. From 1791 on, he took an active part in the French Revolution, serving as a general during the Battle of Valmy and the Flanders campaign. An associate of the Girondins, he became disillusioned by the Revolution and was forced to leave for Britain.

In 1806, Miranda launched an unsuccessful expedition to liberate Venezuela with volunteers from the United States. He returned to Caracas following the outbreak of the Venezuelan War of Independence in 1810 and was granted dictatorial powers after the establishment of the First Republic. In 1812, the republic collapsed and Miranda was forced to finalize an armistice with Spanish royalists. Other revolutionary leaders including Simón Bolívar considered his capitulation treasonous, and allowed his arrest by the Spanish authorities. He was taken to a prison in Cádiz, where he died four years later.

== Early life ==
Miranda was born in Caracas, Venezuela Province, in the Spanish colonial Viceroyalty of New Granada, and baptized on 5 April 1750. His father, Sebastián de Miranda Ravelo, was a Spanish immigrant from the Canary Islands who had become a successful and wealthy merchant, and his mother, Francisca Antonia Rodríguez de Espinoza, was a wealthy Venezuelan. Growing up, Miranda enjoyed a wealthy upbringing and attended the finest private schools. However, he was not necessarily a member of high society; his father faced some discrimination from rivals due to his Canarian roots.

== Education ==
Miranda's father, Sebastián, always strove to improve the situation of the family, and in addition to accumulating wealth and attaining important positions, he ensured his children an advanced education. Miranda was first tutored by Jesuits, Jorge Lindo and Juan Santaella, before entering the Academy of Santa Rosa.

On 10 January 1762, Miranda began his studies at the Royal and Pontifical University of Caracas, where he studied Latin, the early grammar of Nebrija, and the Catechism of Ripalda for two years. Miranda completed this preliminary course in September 1764 and continued as a senior student. Between 1764 and 1766, Miranda studied the writings of Cicero and Virgil, grammar, history, religion, geography and arithmetic.

In June 1767, Miranda received his baccalaureate degree in the Humanities. It is unknown if Miranda received the title of Doctor, as the only evidence in favor of this title is his personal testimony stating he received it in 1767, at age 17.

=== Issues of ethnic lineage ===
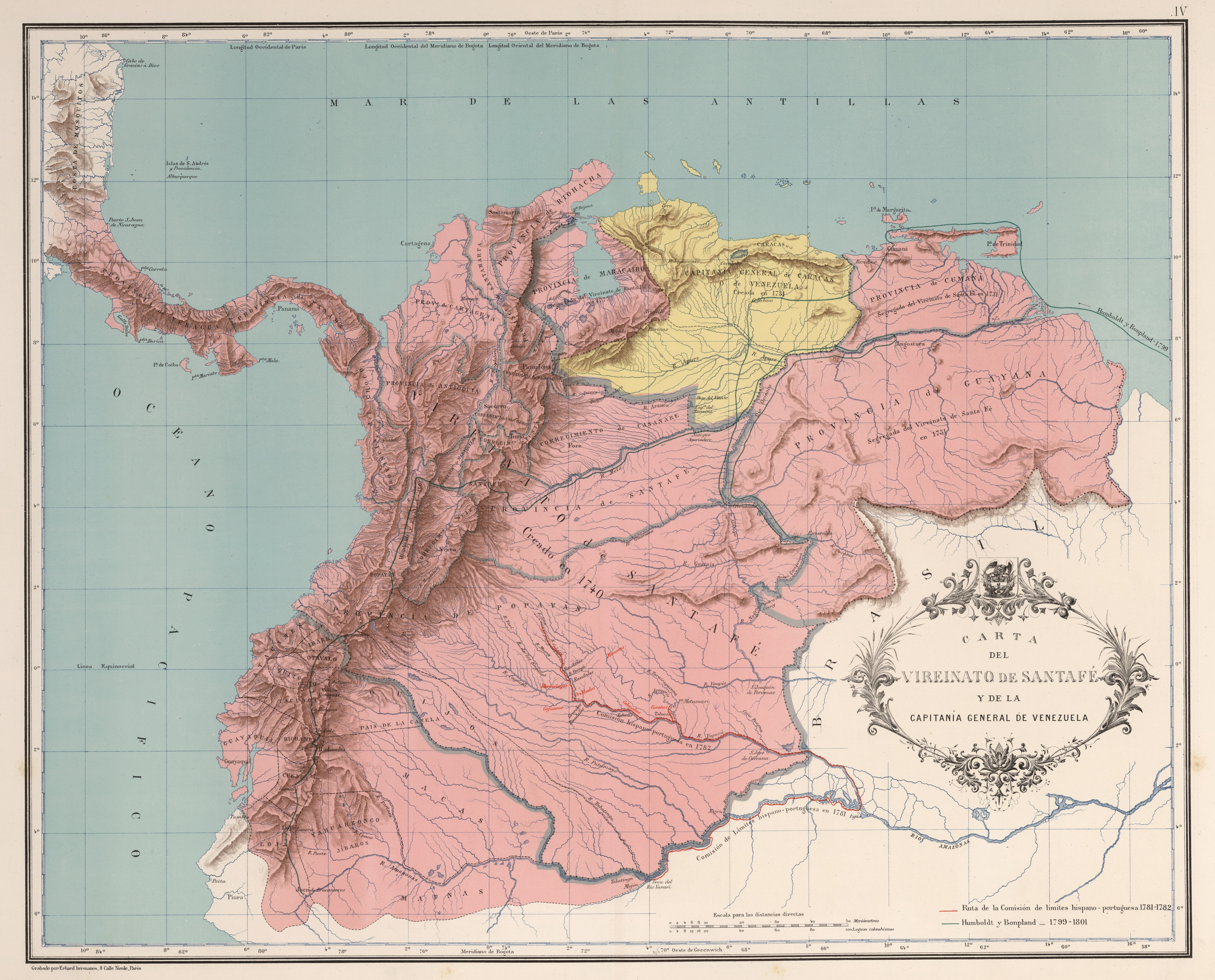
Viceroyalty of New Granada (in pink) and the province of Venezuela (in yellow) in 1742

Beginning in 1767, Miranda's studies were disrupted in part due to his father's rising prominence in Caracas society. In 1764, Sebastián de Miranda was appointed the captain of the local militia known as the Company of the White Canary Islanders by the governor, José Solano y Bote. Sebastián de Miranda directed his regiment for five years, but his new title and societal position bothered the white aristocracy, the Mantuanos. In retaliation, a competing faction formed a militia of its own and two local aristocrats, Don Juan Nicolas de Ponte and Don Martin Tovar Blanco, filed a complaint against Sebastián de Miranda.

Sebastián de Miranda requested and was granted honorary military discharge to avoid further antagonizing the local elite, and spent many years attempting to clear the family name and establish the "purity" of his family line. The need to establish the "cleanliness" of the family bloodline was important to maintain a place in society in Caracas, as it was what allowed the family to attend university, to marry in the church, and to attain government positions. In 1769, Sebastián produced a notarized genealogy to prove that his family had no African, Jewish or Muslim ancestors, according to the records in the National Archive of Venezuela. Miranda's father obtained a blood cleanliness certificate, which should not be confounded with the blood nobility certificate.

In 1770, Sebastián proved his family's rights through an official patent, signed by Charles III, which confirmed Sebastián's title and societal standing. The court ruling, however, created an irreconcilable enmity with the aristocratic elite, who never forgot the conflict nor forgave the challenge, which inevitably influenced subsequent decisions by Miranda.

== Voyage to Spain (1771–1780) ==
After the court victory of his father, Miranda decided to pursue a new life in Spain, and, on 25 January 1771, Miranda left Caracas from the port of La Guaira for Cádiz, Spain, on a Swedish frigate, the Prince Frederick. Miranda landed at the Port of Cádiz on 1 arch 1771, where he stayed for two weeks with a distant relative, Jose D'Anino, before leaving for Madrid.

=== In Madrid ===
On 28 March 1790 Miranda travelled to Madrid and took an interest in the libraries, architecture, and art that he found there. In Madrid, Miranda pursued his education, especially modern languages, as they would allow him to travel throughout Europe. He also sought to expand his knowledge of mathematics, history, and political science, as he aimed to serve the Spanish Crown as a military officer. During this time, he also pursued genealogical research of his family name to establish his ties to Europe and Christianity, which was especially important to him after his father's struggles to legitimize their family line in Caracas.

It was in Madrid that Miranda began to build his personal library, which he added to as he traveled, collecting books, manuscripts and letters.

In January 1773, Miranda's father transferred 85,000 reales vellon (silver coins), to help his son obtain the position of captain in the Princess' Regiment.

=== Early campaigns ===
During his first year as a captain, Miranda traveled with his regiment mainly in North Africa and the southern Spanish province of Andalusia. In December 1774, Spain declared war with Morocco, and Miranda experienced his first combat during the conflict.

While Miranda was assigned to guard the stations of an unwanted colonial presence in North Africa, he began to draw connections to the similar colonial presence in Spanish South America. His first military feat took place during the Siege of Melilla, held from 9 December 1774 to 19 March 1775, in which the Spanish forces managed to repel the Moroccan sultan, Mohammed ben Abdallah. However, despite the actions taken and danger faced, Miranda did not get an award or promotion and was assigned to the garrison of Cádiz.

Despite Miranda's success in the military, he faced many disciplinary complaints, ranging from complaints that he spent too much time reading, to financial discrepancies, to the most serious disciplinary charges of violence and abuse of authority. One of Miranda's well-known enemies was Colonel Juan Roca, who charged Miranda with the loss of company funds and brutalities against soldiers in Miranda's regiment. The account of the dispute was sent to Inspector General O'Reilly and eventually reached King Charles III, who ordered Miranda to be transferred back to Cádiz.

== Missions in America (1781–1784) ==
=== The American Revolution ===
Spain became involved in the American Revolutionary War in order to expand their territories in Louisiana and Florida and to seek a recapture of Gibraltar. The Spanish Captain-General of Louisiana, Bernardo de Gálvez, in 1779 launched several offensives at Baton Rouge and Natchez, securing the way for the reconquest of Florida.

Spanish forces had begun mobilising to support their American allies, and Miranda was ordered to report to the Regiment of Aragon, which sailed from Cádiz in spring of 1780 under Victoriano de Navia's command. Miranda reported to his chief, General Juan Manuel Cagigal y Monserrat, in Havana, Cuba. From their headquarters in Cuba, de Cagigal and Miranda participated in the Siege of Pensacola on 9 May 1781, and Miranda was awarded the temporary title of lieutenant colonel during this action. Miranda also contributed to the French success during the Battle of the Chesapeake when he helped the Comte de Grasse raise needed funds and supplies for the battle.

=== The Antilles ===
Miranda remained prominent while in Pensacola, and in August 1781, Cagigal secretly sent Miranda to Jamaica to arrange for the release of 900 prisoners-of-war, see to their immediate needs, and acquire auxiliary vessels for the Spanish Navy. Miranda was also asked to perform espionage work while staying with his British hosts. Miranda managed to perform a successful reconnaissance mission and also negotiated an agreement dated 18 November 1781, that regulated the exchange of Spanish prisoners. Miranda also entered into a deal with a local merchant, Philip Allwood. Miranda agreed to use the ships he had purchased during his stay in Jamaica to transport Allwood's goods back to Spain to sell them.

Upon his return, Miranda was charged with being a spy and smuggler of enemy goods. The order to send Miranda back to Spain pursuant to the judgment of 5 February 1782, of the Supreme Inquisition Council failed to be met due to various faults of form and substance in the administrative process that caused the order to be questioned and, in part, by Cagigal's unconditional support of Miranda.

In 1782, Miranda participated in the Capture of the Bahamas and carried news of the island's fall to Gálvez. Gálvez was angry that the Bahamas expedition had gone ahead without his permission, and he imprisoned Cagigal and had Miranda arrested. Miranda was later released, but this experience of Spanish officialdom may have been a factor in his subsequent conversion to the idea of independence for Spain's American colonies. The efficiency demonstrated by Miranda in the Bahamas led Cagigal to recommend that Miranda be promoted to colonel under the command of the General Commander of the Spanish forces in Cuba, Bernardo de Gálvez, in St. Domingue, which the Spanish American authorities referred to Guarico. This should not be confused with the current Guárico State located today in central Venezuela.

At that time, the Spaniards were preparing a joint action with the French to invade Jamaica, which was a major British stronghold in the region, and Guárico was the ideal place to plan these operations, being close to the island and providing easy access for troops and commanders. Miranda was seen as the right person to plan operations because he had firsthand knowledge of the disposition of the troops and fortifications in Jamaica. However, the Royal Navy decisively defeated the French fleet at the Battle of the Saintes, so the invasion did not materialise and Miranda remained in Guarico.

=== Exile in the United States ===
With the failure of the invasion of Jamaica, priorities for the Spanish authorities changed, and the process of the Inquisition against Miranda gained momentum. The authorities sent Miranda to Havana to be arrested and sent to Spain. In February 1783, Minister of the Indies José de Gálvez sent the Captain General of Havana, Don Luis de Unzaga y Amézaga to arrest him. The information of his impending arrest reached Miranda in advance. Aware that he would not be given a fair trial in Spain, Miranda managed, with the help of Cajigal and the American James Seagrove, to slip away on a ship bound for the United States, arriving at New Bern, North Carolina on 10 July 1783. During his time in the United States, Miranda made a critical study of its military defenses, demonstrating extensive knowledge of the development of American conflict and circumstances.

While there, Miranda prepared and fixed a correspondence technique, used for the rest of his journey: he would meet people through the gift or loan of books, and examine the culture and customs of the places through which he passed in a methodical way. Passing through Charleston, Philadelphia, and Boston, he dealt with different characters in American society. In New York City he met the prominent and politically connected Livingston family. Apparently Miranda had a romantic relationship with Susan Livingston, daughter of Chancellor Livingston. Although Miranda wrote to her for years, he never saw her again after leaving New York.

During his time in the United States, Miranda met with many important people. He was personally acquainted with George Washington in Philadelphia. He also met General Henry Knox, Thomas Paine, Alexander Hamilton, Samuel Adams, and Thomas Jefferson. He also visited various institutions of the new nation that impressed him such as the Library of Newport and Princeton College. Travelling from North-Carolina to Massachusetts he met with John Skey Eustace, then a revolutionary soldier, who may have been influenced by the dynamic Miranda who had a secret project to emancipate the Kingdom of Venezuela from Spanish rule.

== In Europe (1785–1790) ==
=== Great Britain ===
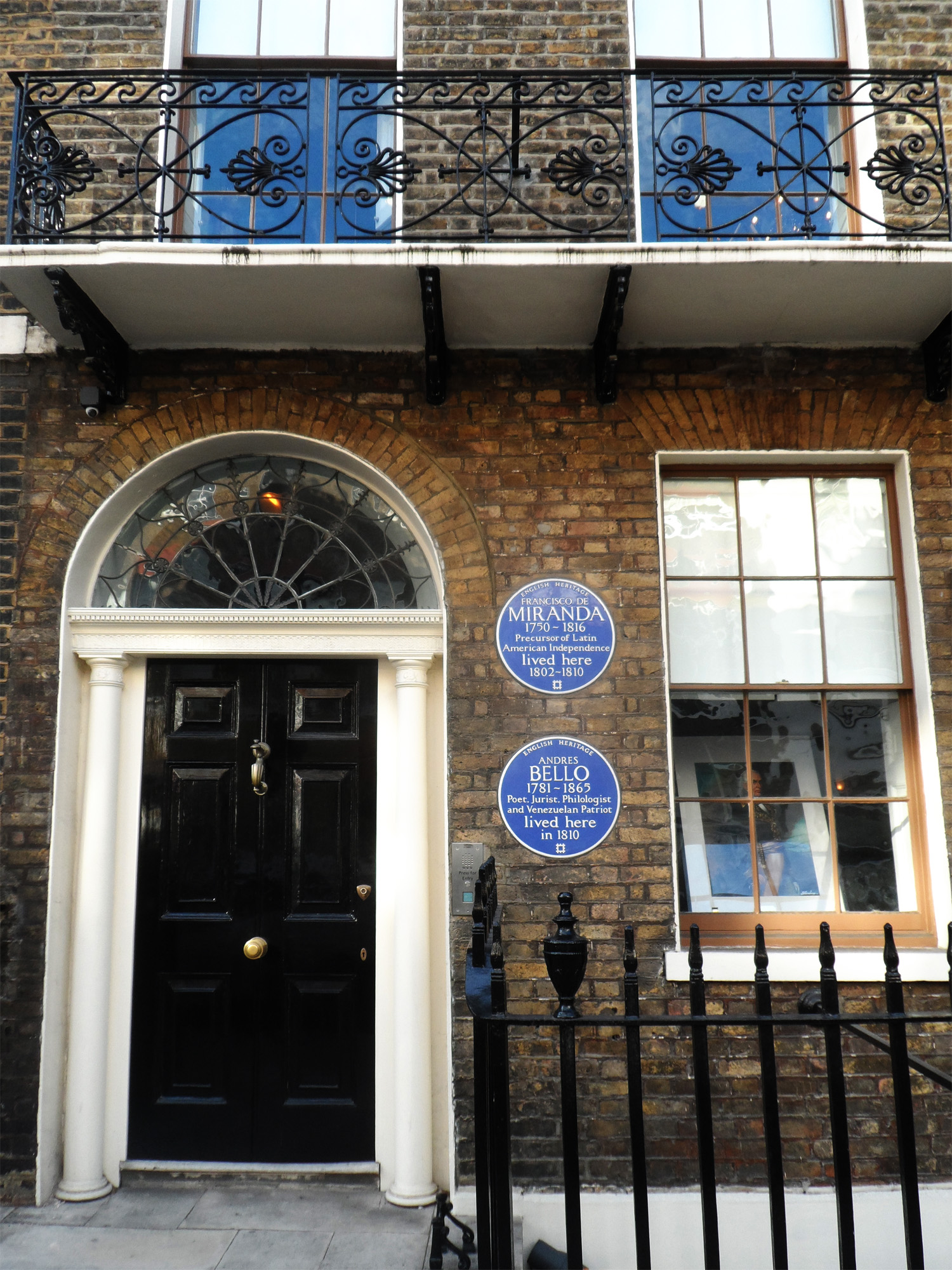
Miranda's house in London, where he lived between 1802 and 1810, until he traveled to Venezuela to join the independence movement.

On 15 December 1784, Miranda left the port of Boston in the merchant frigate Neptuno for London and arrived in England on 10 February 1785. While in London, Miranda was discreetly watched by the Spanish, who were suspicious of him. The reports highlight that Miranda had meetings with people suspected of conspiring against Spain and people considered among the eminent scholars of the time.

=== Prussia ===
The first secretary of the U.S. embassy, Colonel William Stephens Smith, whom Miranda knew from his stay in New York, came to England at around the same time. The US Ambassador was John Adams. Miranda visited them many times and continued the conversations about independence he had had with General Washington, Jefferson, Hamilton, Knox, among many other patriots in Philadelphia, New York, and other cities. Miranda and Smith decided to travel to Prussia to attend military exercises prepared by Prussian king, Frederick the Great.

Bernardo del Campo, ambassador of Spain in the British capital since 1783, kept Miranda entertained with the idea that the king was close to resolve his situation. In fact, he was keeping Miranda under surveillance. When Miranda announced his sudden trip to continental Europe, he "gladly" gave Miranda a letter of introduction to the minister (ambassador) of Spain in Berlin who would be in charge of reporting frequently to Madrid. James Penman, an English businessman whom Miranda had befriended in Charleston, was responsible for keeping his papers while he traveled.

The Spanish ambassador had secretly intrigued to have Miranda arrested when he reached Calais, France, where he could be handed over to Spain. The plan fell apart because the Venezuelan and his friend went on 10 August 1785 to a Dutch port (Hellevoetsluis) instead.

=== Sweden ===
Between September and December 1787 Miranda travelled through Sweden, and visited Norway. Miranda arrived in Stockholm on 21 September 1787, from Saint Petersburg. He stayed in the city until 24 September, returning on 3 October and then staying for almost a month until 1 November. He carried a letter of recommendation from empress Catherine the Great and was also shown support from the Russian ambassador in Stockholm Andrey Razumovsky. Through these connections he was invited to Stockholm Palace and an audience with king Gustav III on 17 October. The Spanish ambassador in Stockholm, Ignacio de Corral, demanded that Miranda should be extradited in December, at which time he had already left.

He did not win support for his cause, but he later published excerpts from his journal about his experiences in Sweden. When visiting Gothenburg he had an affair with Christina Hall, the wife of one of the wealthiest merchants of Gothenburg John Hall. He also visited the family's country retreat, Gunnebo House, on the outskirts of the city.

Then Miranda made his way to Norway and arrived in Denmark in 1787. But in the Danish press he was accused of being a spy for the Empress of Russia. There is talk of extradition to Spain. But the King of Denmark assures him of his support. Francisco Miranda is bored at the Court of Denmark. He decides to go to Germany. Seeing the canal that connects the Baltic to the North Sea, he imagines the possibility of digging one in Panama that would join the Atlantic and the Pacific. He then traveled to Belgium and Switzerland and, on 24 May 1789, Francisco Miranda arrived in Paris.

=== Russia ===
Miranda then travelled throughout Europe, including present-day Belgium, Germany, Austria, Hungary, Poland, Greece and Italy, where he remained for over a year. After passing through Constantinople, Turkey, he visited the court of Catherine the Great, who was visiting Kiev and the Crimea. In Crimea, Miranda was received by the influential Prince Grigory Potemkin and later on, when the empress arrived, he was introduced to her. His sojourn in Russia took much longer because of the unexpected hospitality and attention received by the court and the empress. When she realized the dangers surrounding him, particularly the Inquisition order for his apprehension, she decided to protect him at all cost.

She instructed all Russian ambassadors in Europe to assist him in any form and with great care, in order to protect him from the persecution in place. She extended him a Russian passport. He was also introduced to the king of Poland, Stanisław II August, with whom he exchanged many intellectual and political views on America and Europe. The king invited him to Poland. In Hungary, he stayed in the palace of Prince Nicholas Esterházy, who was sympathetic to his ideas, and wrote him a letter of recommendation to meet the musician Joseph Haydn.

Attempts to abduct Miranda by the diplomatic representatives of Spain failed as the Russian ambassador in London, Semyon Vorontsov, declared on 4 August 1789, to the Secretary of State for Foreign Affairs, Francis Osborne, that Miranda, although a Spanish subject, was a member of the Russian diplomatic mission in London. Miranda made use of the Spanish–British diplomatic row known as the Nootka Crisis in February 1790 to present to some British cabinet ministers his ideas about the independence of Spanish territories in America.

In April 1788 Miranda visited the Dutch Republic and met with merchants on the Caribbean, the scientist Petrus Camper in the Hague and the banker Henry Hope at villa Welgelegen in Haarlem. Miranda was particularly interested in the organization and living conditions of prisons and charitable institutions.

== Miranda and the French Revolution (1791–1798) ==
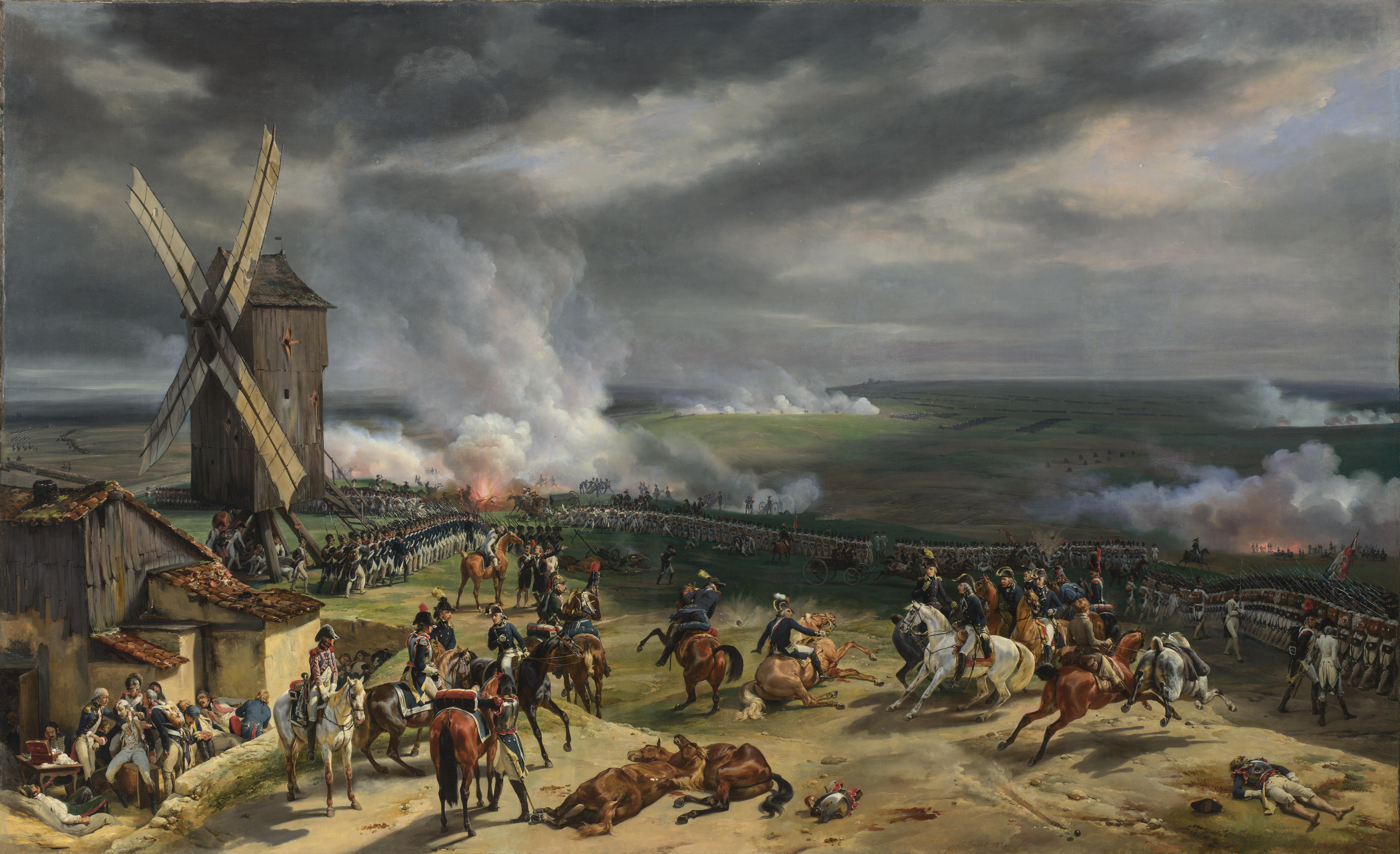
The Battle of Valmy by Horace Vernet

Starting in 1791, Miranda took an active part in the French Revolution as a maréchal de camp. In Paris, he befriended the Girondins Jacques Pierre Brissot and Jérôme Pétion de Villeneuve. He served in the Army of the North under Charles François Dumouriez and took part in the 1792 campaign, including the Battle of Valmy. On 13 December 1792, John Skey Eustace was suspended from his command and ordered to report to Paris to explain his conduct before the National Convention. Miranda assumed command.

Miranda subsequently commanded French forces in the Austrian Netherlands, capturing Antwerp. In January 1793, he was consulted about plans for an invasion of the Dutch Republic and recommended a large-scale advance between Nijmegen and Bergen op Zoom rather than the proposed limited invasion of Zeeland. During the subsequent invasion, Dumouriez advanced through Staats-Brabant towards Breda and Moerdijk, while Miranda's army was to protect the eastern flank. Miranda concentrated his forces around Maastricht from 6 February and began the siege later that month. Following the Allied victory at Aldenhoven on 1 March, however, his army was threatened with being cut off. He abandoned the siege on 2 March and withdrew towards Leuven, exposing the eastern flank of the French forces invading the Dutch Republic.

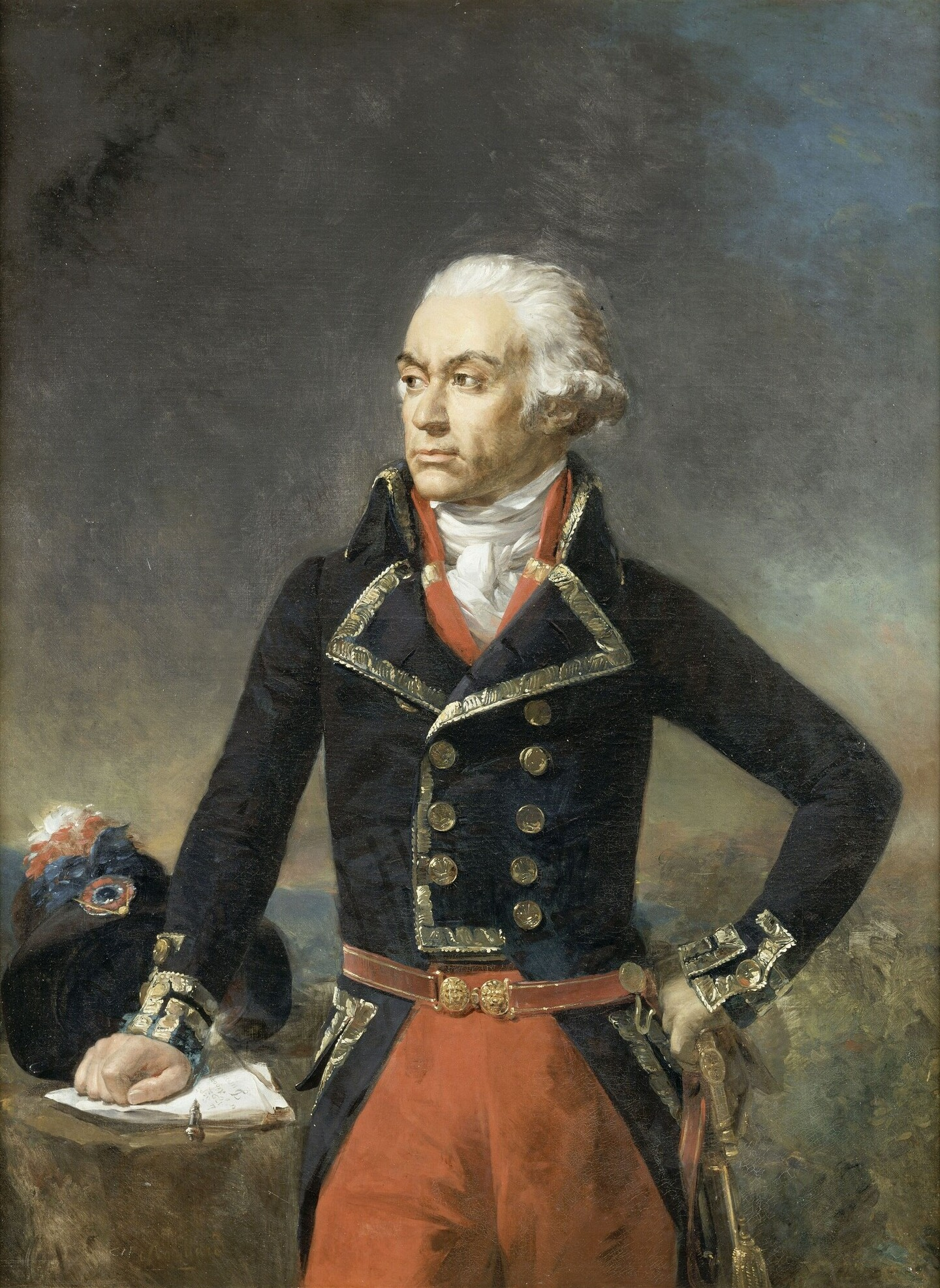
French commander Charles François Dumouriez, who used the town of Tienen as a base during the March 1793 Battle of Neerwinden

After the French defeat at the Battle of Neerwinden on 18 March, Dumouriez blamed Miranda for the failure of the French left wing and accused him of disobeying orders. Their relationship had already deteriorated: Dumouriez had attempted to involve Miranda in his political plans, but Miranda refused and threatened to warn his allies in the National Convention. Miranda appeared before the National Convention on 29 March and was subsequently questioned by the War Committee about his conduct at Maastricht and Neerwinden. In his defence, he produced Dumouriez's written orders and maintained that he had acted under the authority of the commander-in-chief. An investigation followed into the military leadership of Miranda.

In May, Miranda was tried before the Revolutionary Tribunal on charges of high treason and complicity with Dumouriez. He was defended by Claude François Chauveau-Lagarde and was unanimously acquitted. On 12 May, Eustace, whose professed love for Miranda had turned into bitter hatred, openly avowed that he considered it an honor to detest the accused, whereupon Fouquier-Tinville promptly announced that his testimony could not be accepted.

However, Marat denounced Chauveau-Lagarde as a defender of the guilty, while opposition to Miranda among the Jacobins continued. On 5 July 1793, the Committee of Public Safety ordered Miranda's arrest along with several of his Girondin friends and supporters. Robespierre personally questioned him before the Committee, where Miranda was accused of being a leading defender of the Girondins. He was subsequently imprisoned in La Force prison without a new trial.

Miranda seems to have survived by a combination of good luck and political expediency: the revolutionary government simply could not agree on what to do with him. He remained in La Force even after the fall of Robespierre in July 1794, and was not finally released until January of the following year. The art theorist Quatremère de Quincy was among those who campaigned for his release during this time. Now convinced that the whole direction taken by the Revolution had been wrong, he started to conspire with the moderate royalists against the Directory, and was even named as the possible leader of a military coup. He was arrested and ordered out of the country, only to escape and go into hiding.

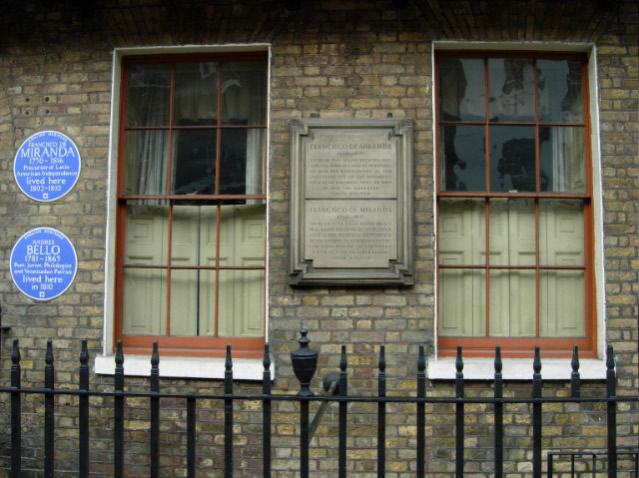
Miranda House, 58 Grafton Way, Fitzrovia, was the London home of Miranda.

He reappeared after being given permission to remain in France, though that did not stop his involvement in yet another monarchist plot in September 1797. The police were ordered to arrest the "Peruvian general", as the said general submerged himself yet again in the underground. With no more illusions about France or the Revolution, he left for England in a Danish boat, arriving in Dover in January 1798. In London he lived at Great Pulteney Street (Soho), in 1800 at Marylebone Road and Tavistock Street, before moving to Grafton Way in 1803.

== Expeditions in South America (1804–1808) ==
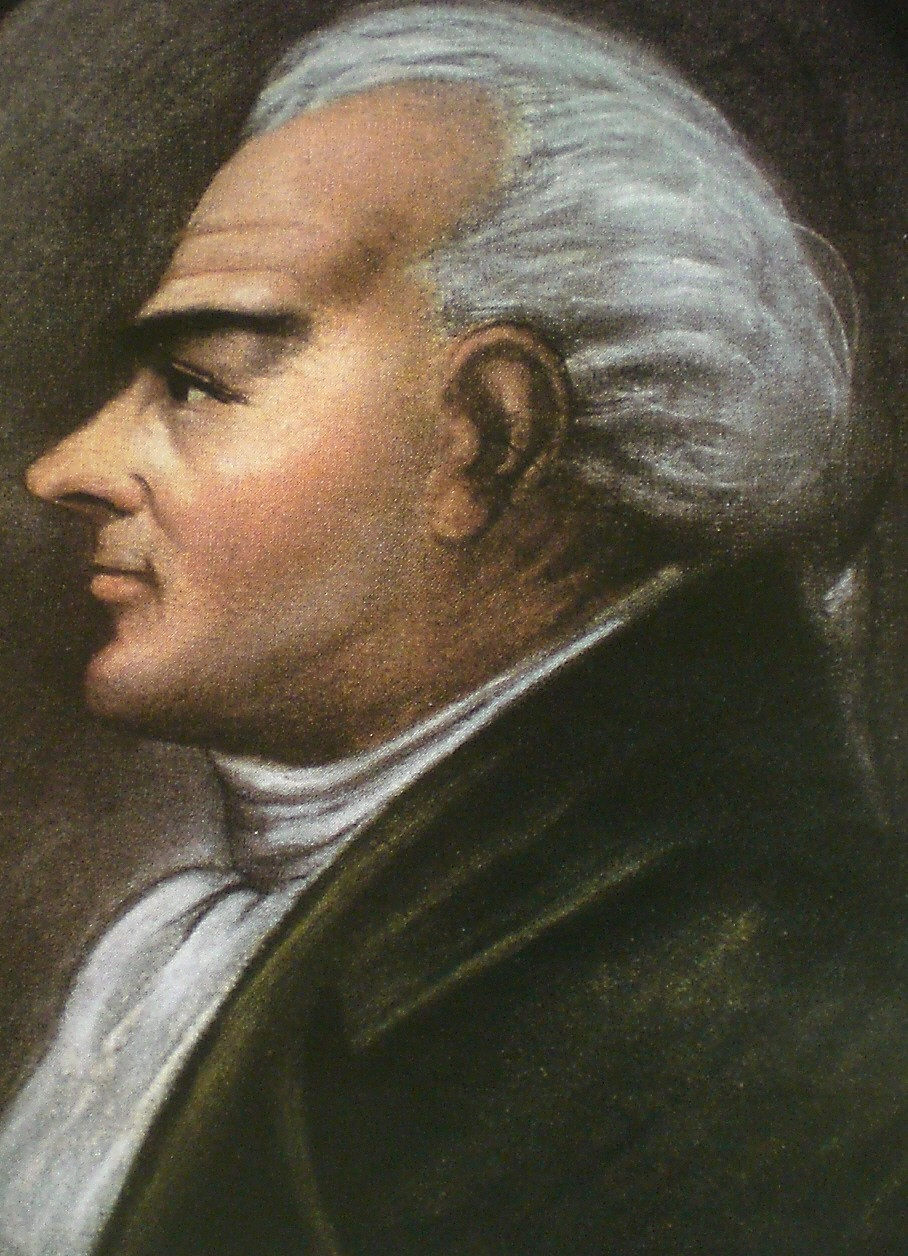
Painting of Miranda by an unknown Incan artist. 1806.

=== Diplomatic negotiations, 1804–1805 ===
In 1804 with informal British help, Miranda presented a military plan to liberate the Captaincy General of Venezuela from Spanish rule. At the time, Britain was at war with Spain, an ally of Napoleon. Home Riggs Popham was commissioned by prime minister Pitt in 1805 to study the plans proposed by Miranda to the British Government, Popham then persuaded the authorities that, as the Spanish Colonies were discontented, it would be easier to promote a rising in Buenos Aires. Disappointed by this decision in November 1805, Miranda travelled to New York, where he rekindled his acquaintance with William S. Smith to organize an expedition to liberate Venezuela. Smith introduced him to merchant Samuel Ogden.

=== Venezuela and the Caribbean, 1806 ===
Miranda then went to Washington for private meetings with President Thomas Jefferson and Secretary of State James Madison, who met with Miranda but did not involve themselves or their nation in his plans, which would have been a violation of the Neutrality Act of 1794. In New York, Miranda privately began organizing a filibustering expedition to liberate Venezuela. Along with Colonel Smith, he raised funds, procured weapons, and recruited mercenaries. Among the 200 volunteers who served under him in this revolt were Smith's son William Steuben and David G. Burnet, who would later serve as interim president of the Republic of Texas after its secession from Mexico in 1836. Miranda hired a 20-gun ship from Ogden, which he rechristened Leander after his oldest son, and set sail to Venezuela on 2 February 1806.

The flag of Miranda used in 1806, during his expedition in Coro.

In Jacmel, Haiti, Miranda acquired two other ships, Bee and Bacchus. On 12 March in Jacmel, Miranda made and raised on Leander the first Venezuelan flag, which he had personally designed. On 28 April, a botched landing attempt in Ocumare de la Costa resulted in two Spanish guarda costas, Argos and Celoso, capturing Bacchus and Bee. 60 men were imprisoned and put on trial in Puerto Cabello for piracy. 10 were sentenced to death by being hanged, drawn and quartered. One of the executed men was the printer Miles L. Hall, who for has been considered as the first martyr of the printing press in Venezuela.

Miranda escaped aboard Leander, and was escorted by HMS Lilly to the British colonies of Grenada, Trinidad and Barbados, where he met with Admiral Alexander Cochrane. As Spain was then at war with Britain, Cochrane and the governor of Trinidad Sir Thomas Hislop, 1st Baronet agreed to provide British support for a second attempt to invade Venezuela. Leander left the Port of Spain on 24 July, together with HMS Express, HMS Attentive, HMS Prevost and Lilly, transporting Miranda and approximately 220 officers and men. Miranda decided to land in La Vela de Coro and the squadron anchored there on 1 August. On the next day, HMS Bacchante joined them for three days. On 3 August, 60 Trinidadian volunteers under the Count de Rouveray, 60 men under Colonel Dowie, and 30 sailors and Royal Marines from Lilly under Lieutenant Beddingfelt landed.

This force cleared the beach of Spanish forces and captured a battery of four 9- and 12-pounder guns. The attackers had four men severely wounded, all from the crew of Lilly. Shortly after, boats from Bacchante landed American volunteers and British sailors and marines. The Spanish retreated, which enabled this force to capture two forts mounting 14 guns. Miranda then marched on and captured Santa Ana de Coro, but found no support from the city's residents. On 8 August, a Spanish force of almost 2,000 men arrived. They captured a master and 14 sailors who were getting water, unbeknownst to Lieutenant Donald Campbell. Lilly landed 20 men on the morning of 10 August; this landing party killed a dozen Spanish soldiers, but was able to rescue only one of the captive seamen.

Downie and 50 men were sent, but he judged the Spanish force to be too strong and withdrew. When 400 Spanish troops came from Maracaibo, Miranda realized that his force was too small to achieve anything further or to hold Santa Ana de Coro for long. On 13 August, Miranda ordered his force to set sail again. Lilly and her squadron then carried him and his men safely to Aruba. In the aftermath of the failed expedition, Carlos Martínez de Irujo, 1st Marquis of Casa Irujo, the Spanish ambassador to the U.S., denounced the American support Miranda had received, which violated the Neutrality Act of 1794. The Municipal Council of Caracas indicted Miranda in absence charged him as pirate and traitor condemned to death penalty. Smith and Ogden were indicted by a federal grand jury in New York for piracy and violating the Neutrality Act of 1794. Put on trial, Smith claimed his orders came from Jefferson and Madison, who refused to appear in court. Both Smith and Ogden were found not guilty.

=== Project to attack Venezuela, 1808 ===
Miranda spent the next year in Trinidad as host of governor Hyslop waiting for reinforcements that never came. On his return to London, he was met with better support for his plans from the British government after the failed invasions of Buenos Aires (1806–1807). In 1808 a large military force to attack Venezuela was assembled and placed under the command of Arthur Wellesley, but Napoleon's invasion of Spain suddenly transformed Spain into an ally of Britain, and the force instead went there to fight in the Peninsular War.

== The First Republic of Venezuela (1811–1812) ==
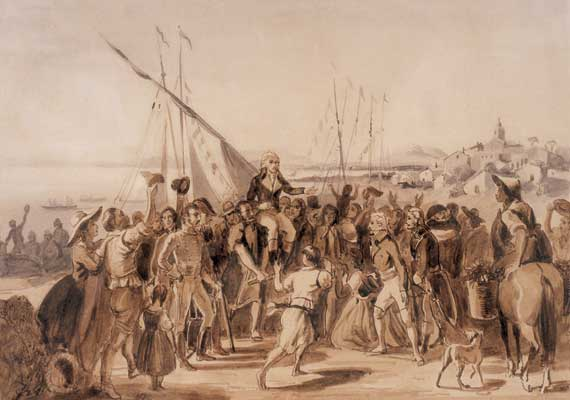
Reception of Miranda in La Guaira, Johann Moritz Rugendas. A delegation from the Supreme Junta of Caracas, among them Bolívar, and a crowd of common people enthusiastically receive Miranda (19th century. Collection of the Fundación John Boulton, Caracas, Venezuela).

=== Return to Venezuela ===
Venezuela achieved de facto independence on Maundy Thursday 19 April 1810, when the Supreme Junta of Caracas was established and the colonial administrators deposed. The Junta sent a delegation to Great Britain to get British recognition and aid. This delegation, which included future Venezuelan notables Simón Bolívar and Andrés Bello, met with and persuaded Miranda to return to his native land. In 1811 a delegation from the Supreme Junta, among them Bolívar, and a crowd of common people enthusiastically received Miranda in La Guaira. In Caracas he agitated for the provisional government to declare independence from Spain under the rule of Joseph Bonaparte.

Miranda gathered around him a group of similarly minded individuals and helped establish an association, la Sociedad Patriótica, modeled on the political clubs of the French Revolution. By the end of the year, the Venezuelan provinces elected a congress to deal with the future of the country, and Miranda was chosen as the delegate from El Pao, Barcelona Province. On 5 July 1811, it formally declared Venezuelan independence and established a republic. The congress also adopted his tricolour as the Republic's flag.

=== Decay of the First Republic of Venezuela ===
==== Crisis of the Republic ====
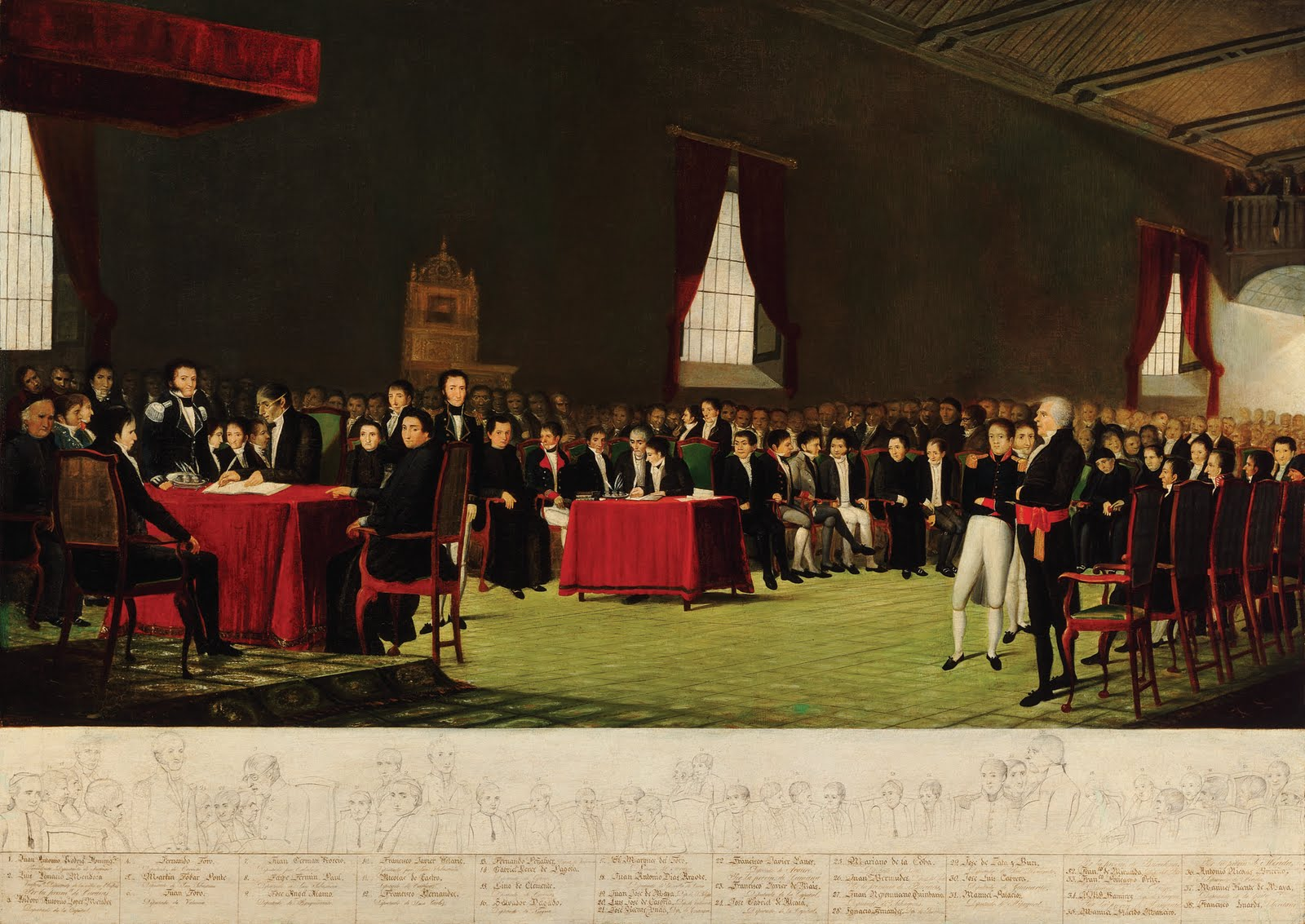
5 de Julio de 1811, by Juan Lovera (1838). Francisco de Miranda (front right in the painting, 52nd in the legend below) was one of the politicians who signed the first Venezuelan Constitution.

The following year Miranda and the young Republic's fortunes turned. Republican forces failed to subdue areas of Venezuela (the provinces of Coro, Maracaibo and Guyana) that had remained royalist. In addition, Venezuela's loss of the Spanish market for its main export, cocoa, caused an economic crisis, which mostly hurt the middle and lower classes, who lost enthusiasm for the Republic. Finally a powerful earthquake and its aftershocks hit the country, which caused large numbers of deaths and serious damage to buildings, mostly in republican areas.

It did not help that it hit on 26 March 1812, as services for Maundy Thursday were beginning. The Caracas Junta had been established on a Maundy Thursday, 19 April 1810 as well, so the earthquake fell on its second anniversary in the liturgical calendar. This was interpreted by many as a sign from Providence. It was explained by royalist authorities as divine punishment for the rebellion against the Spanish Crown.

The archbishop of Caracas, Narciso Coll y Prat, referred to the event as "the terrifying but well-deserved earthquake" that "confirms in our days the prophecies revealed by God to men about the ancient impious and proud cities: Babylon, Jerusalem and the Tower of Babel". Many, including those in the Republican army and the majority of the clergy, began to secretly plot against the Republic or outright defect. Other provinces refused to send reinforcements to Caracas Province. Worse still, whole provinces began to switch sides. On 4 July, an uprising brought Barcelona over to the royalist side.

==== Miranda's dictatorship ====
Neighboring Cumaná, now cut off from the Republican centre, refused to recognize Miranda's dictatorial powers and his appointment of a commandant general. By the middle of the month, many of the outlying areas of Cumaná Province had also defected to the royalists. With these circumstances a Spanish marine frigate captain, Domingo Monteverde, operating out of Coro, was able to turn a small force under his command into a large army, as people joined him on his advance towards Valencia, leaving Miranda in charge of only a small area of central Venezuela. In these dire circumstances Miranda was given broad political powers by his government.

==== Defeat of the Republican army ====
Bolívar lost control of San Felipe Castle of Puerto Cabello along with its ammunition stores on 30 June 1812. Deciding that the situation was lost, Bolívar effectively abandoned his post and retreated to his estate in San Mateo. By mid-July Monteverde had taken Valencia and Miranda also saw the republican cause as lost. He started negotiations with royalists that finalised an armistice on 25 July 1812, signed in San Mateo. Then Colonel Bolívar and other revolutionary officers claimed his actions as treasonous.

=== Miranda's arrest ===
Bolívar and others arrested Miranda and handed him over to the Spanish Royal Army in La Guaira port. For his apparent services to the royalist cause, Monteverde granted Bolívar a passport, and Bolívar left for Curaçao on 27 August. Miranda went to the port of La Guaira intending to leave on a British ship before the royalists arrived, although under the armistice there was an amnesty for political offenses. Bolívar claimed afterwards that he wanted to shoot Miranda as a traitor but was restrained by the others; Bolívar's reasoning was that, "if Miranda believed the Spaniards would observe the treaty, he should have remained to keep them to their word; if he did not, he was a traitor to have sacrificed his army to it."

By handing over Miranda to the Spanish, Bolívar assured himself a passport from the Spanish authorities (passports which, nevertheless, had been guaranteed to all republicans who requested them by the terms of the armistice), which allowed him to leave Venezuela unmolested, and Miranda thought that the situation was hopeless.

== Last years (1813–1816) ==
Miranda never saw freedom again. He was reminded to Fort San Carlos of La Guaira, San Felipe Castle of Puerto Cabello and then to El Morro de San Juan of Puerto Rico. His case was still being processed when he died in a prison cell at the Penal de las Cuatro Torres at the Arsenal de la Carraca, outside Cádiz, aged 66, on 14 July 1816. Miranda was buried in a mass grave, making it impossible to identify his remains, so an empty tomb has been left for him in the National Pantheon of Venezuela.

== Miranda's ideals ==
Comparative maps of the envisioned nation of Colombia, according to Miranda (1798, left) and Bolívar (1826, right).

=== Political beliefs ===
Miranda has long been associated with the struggle of the Spanish colonies in Latin America for independence. He envisioned an independent empire consisting of all the territories that had been under Spanish and Portuguese rule, stretching from the Mississippi River to Cape Horn. This empire was to be under the leadership of a hereditary emperor called the "Inca", in honor of the great Inca Empire, and would have a bicameral legislature. He conceived the name Colombia for this empire, after the explorer Christopher Columbus.

=== Freemasonry ===
Miranda was often in the company of Freemasons, however "there is no proof whatsoever he was ever initiated in a masonic lodge." Also, "Miranda himself never claims to be a freemason." However others have contended that in London he founded the lodge "The Great American Reunion".

== Personal life ==
After fighting for Revolutionary France, Miranda finally made his home in London, where he had two children, Leandro (1803 – Paris, 1886) and Francisco (1806 – Cerinza, Colombia, 1831), with his housekeeper, Sarah Andrews, whom he later married. He had a friendship with the painter James Barry, the uncle of the surgeon James Barry; Miranda helped to keep the secret that the latter was biologically female.

According to historian Linda de Pauw, "Miranda was an ardent feminist, named women as his literary executors, and published an impassioned plea for female education a year before Mary Wollstonecraft published her famous Vindication of the Rights of Women." Miranda's library was sold at auction by R. H. Evans. The first part was sold on 22 July 1828 (and two following days) in London and a copy of the catalogue is at Cambridge University Library (shelfmark Munby.c.132(12)).

== Legacy and honours ==
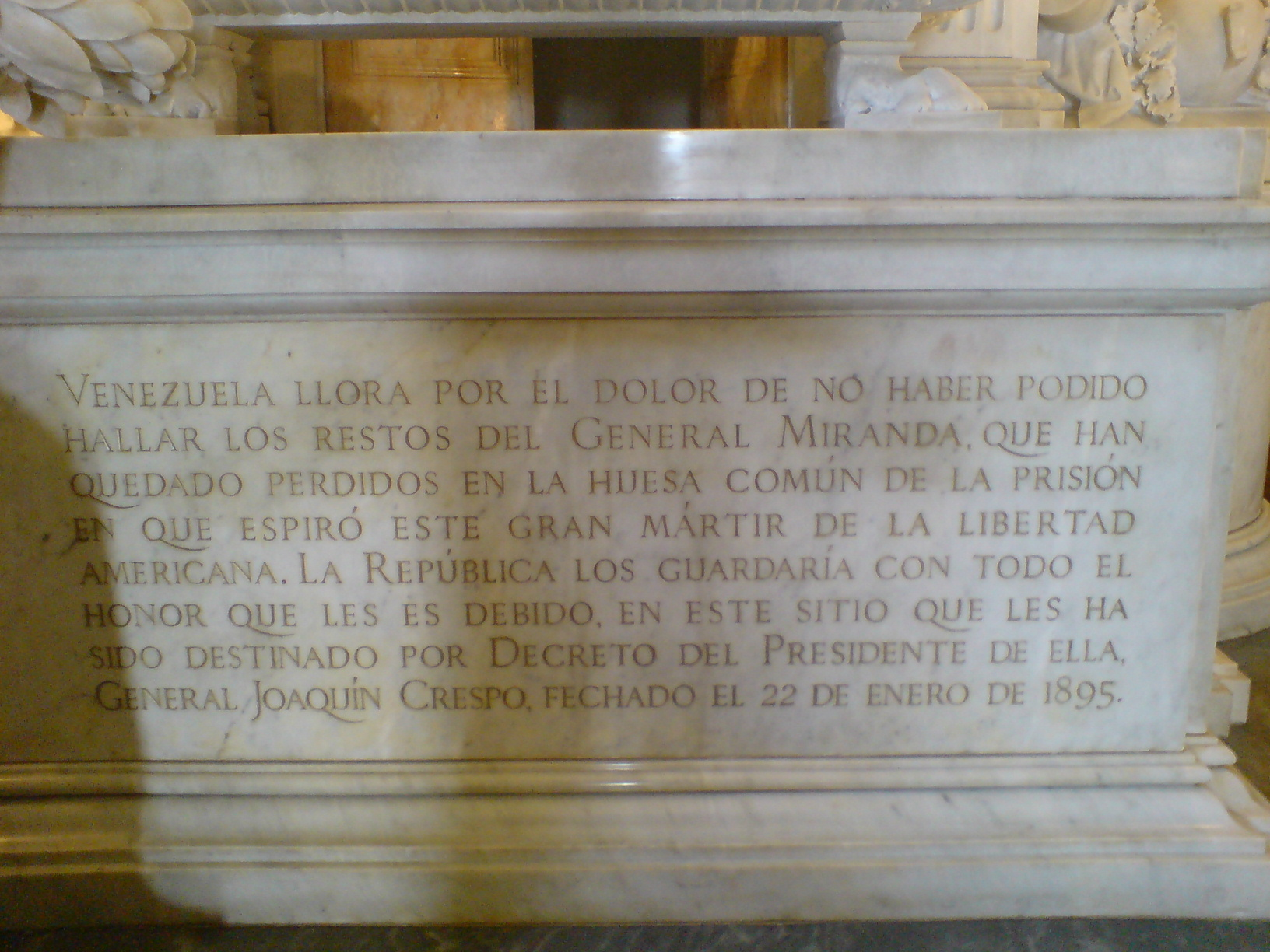
Epitaph of Francisco de Miranda in the National Pantheon.

- An oil painting by the Venezuelan artist Arturo Michelena, Miranda en la Carraca (1896), which portrays the hero in the Spanish jail where he died, has become a graphic symbol of Venezuelan history, and has immortalized the image of Miranda for generations of Venezuelans.
- The Order of Francisco de Miranda was established in 1939 destined to reward the services done to science, to the progress of the country and to outstanding merit.
- In 2006, Venezuela's Flag Day was moved to 3 August, in honor of Miranda's 1806 landing at La Vela de Coro.
- Miranda's life was portrayed in the Venezuelan film Francisco de Miranda (2006), as well as in the unrelated film Miranda Returns (2007).
- The best-known work of Venezuelan composer José Antonio Calcaño is the ballet Miranda en Rusia.
- There are statues of Miranda in Ankara, Bogotá, Caracas, Cádiz (Spain), Havana, London, Paris, Patras (Greece), Pensacola (USA), Philadelphia, Funchal, San Juan (Puerto Rico), São Paulo (Brazil), Saint Petersburg (Russia), Puerto de La Cruz (Spain), and Valmy (France). In France, the name of Miranda remains engraved on the Arc de Triomphe of Paris, which was built during the First Empire, and his portrait is in the Palace of Versailles. His statue is in the Square de l'Amérique-Latine in the 17th arrondissement.
- The house where Miranda lived in London, 27 Grafton Street (now 58 Grafton Way), Bloomsbury, has a blue plaque that bears his name, and functions today as the Consulate of Venezuela in the United Kingdom.
- The Miranda archive rests in the National Archives of Venezuela. In 2007, UNESCO added this collection of 63 volumes to its Memory of the World international register.
- In 2016 the Municipal Council of Caracas agreed to pardon Miranda by acquitting him of charges of treason, piracy, including the death penalty, imposed by the colonial councillors in 1806 after the failed attempt to liberate Venezuela from Spanish rule. At the commemoration of the bicentennial anniversary of his death, the Executive posthumously conferred on him the title of Chief Admiral.

Miranda's name has been honored several times, including in the name of the Venezuelan state, Miranda (created in 1889), a Venezuelan harbour, Puerto Miranda, a subway station and an important main avenue in Caracas, as well as a number of Venezuelan municipalities named "Miranda" or "Francisco de Miranda". One of the Bolivarian missions, Mission Miranda, is named after him. Other things named after him include a Caracas airbase, a Caracas park; a square in Pensacola, Florida; and the Venezuelan Remote Sensing Satellite-1 (VRSS-1 also known as "Satellite Francisco Miranda"), launched in 2012.

== Gallery ==
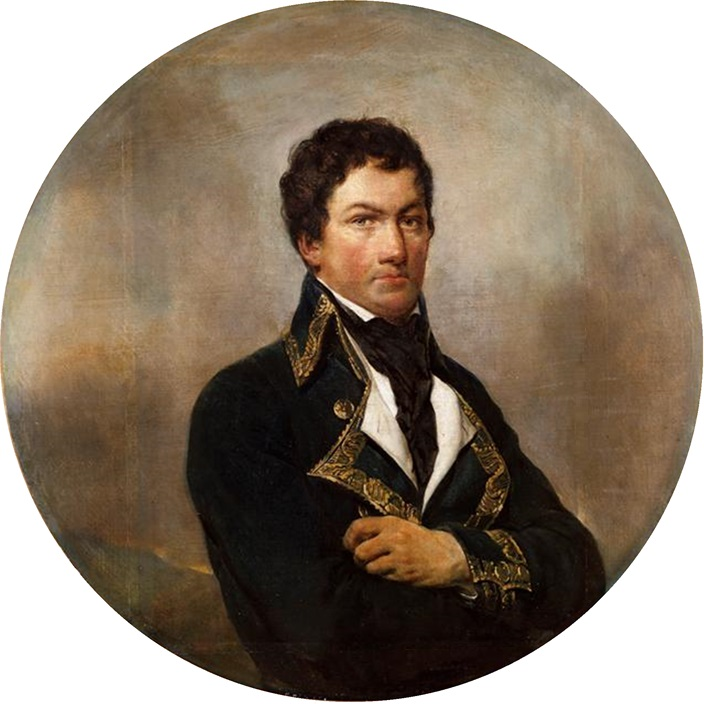
Portrait of Miranda in 1792, by Georges Rouget (1835).

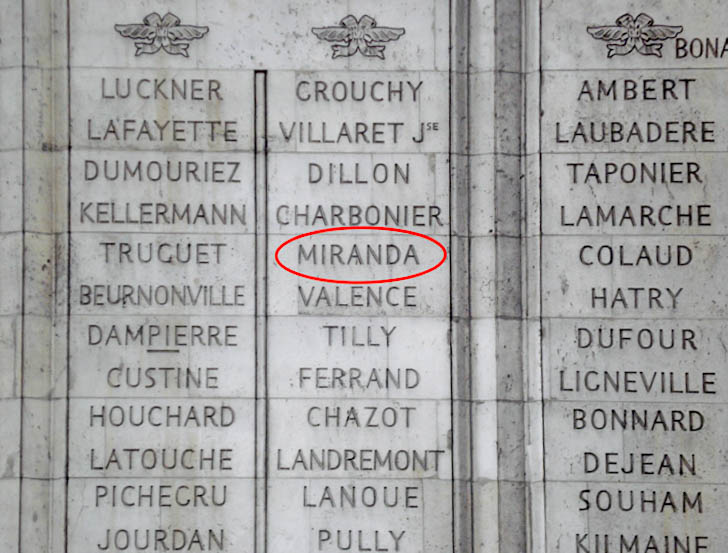
Miranda's name transcribed beneath the Arc de Triomphe, column 4.

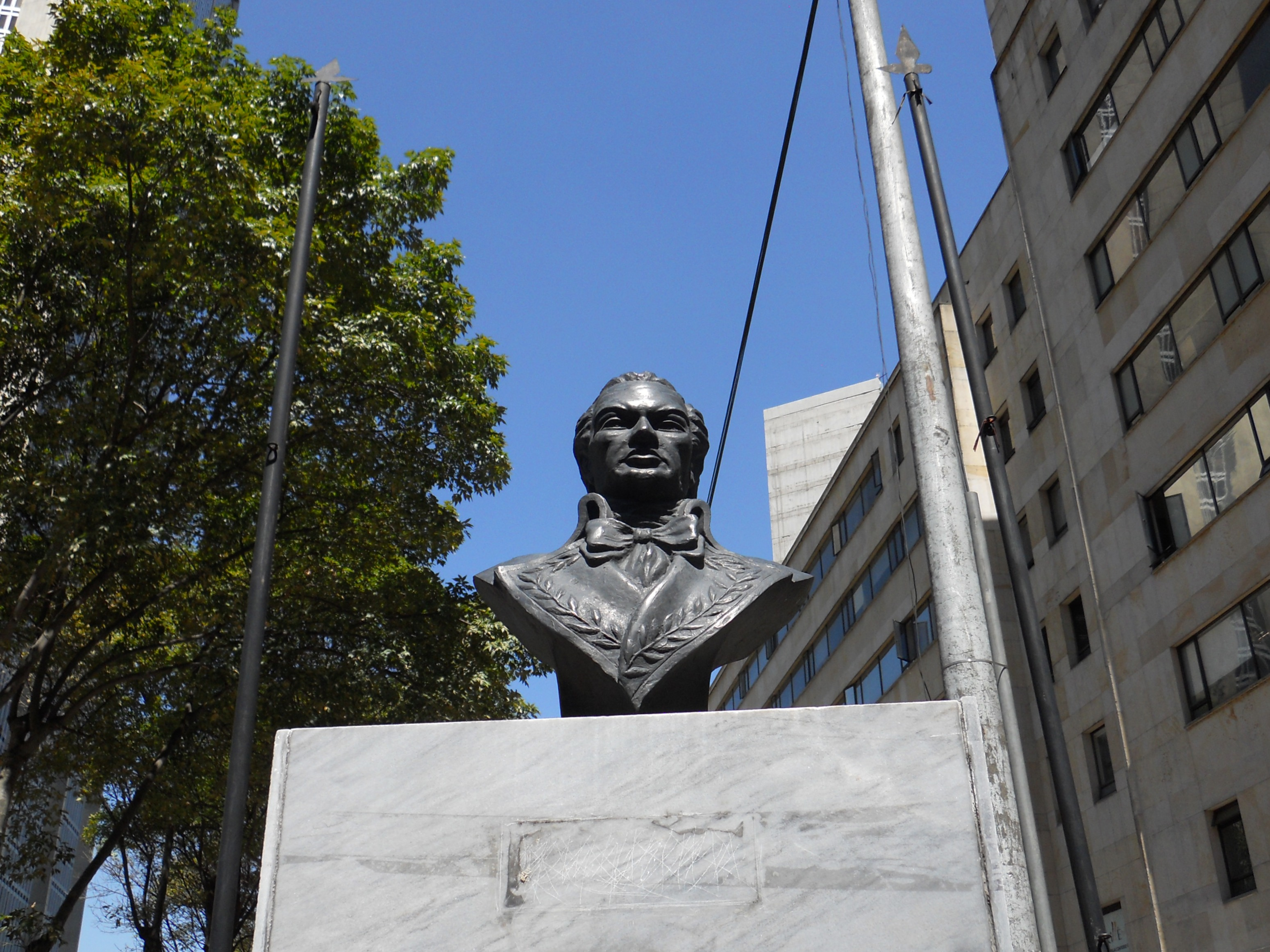
Bust of Francisco de Miranda, Bogotá, Colombia.

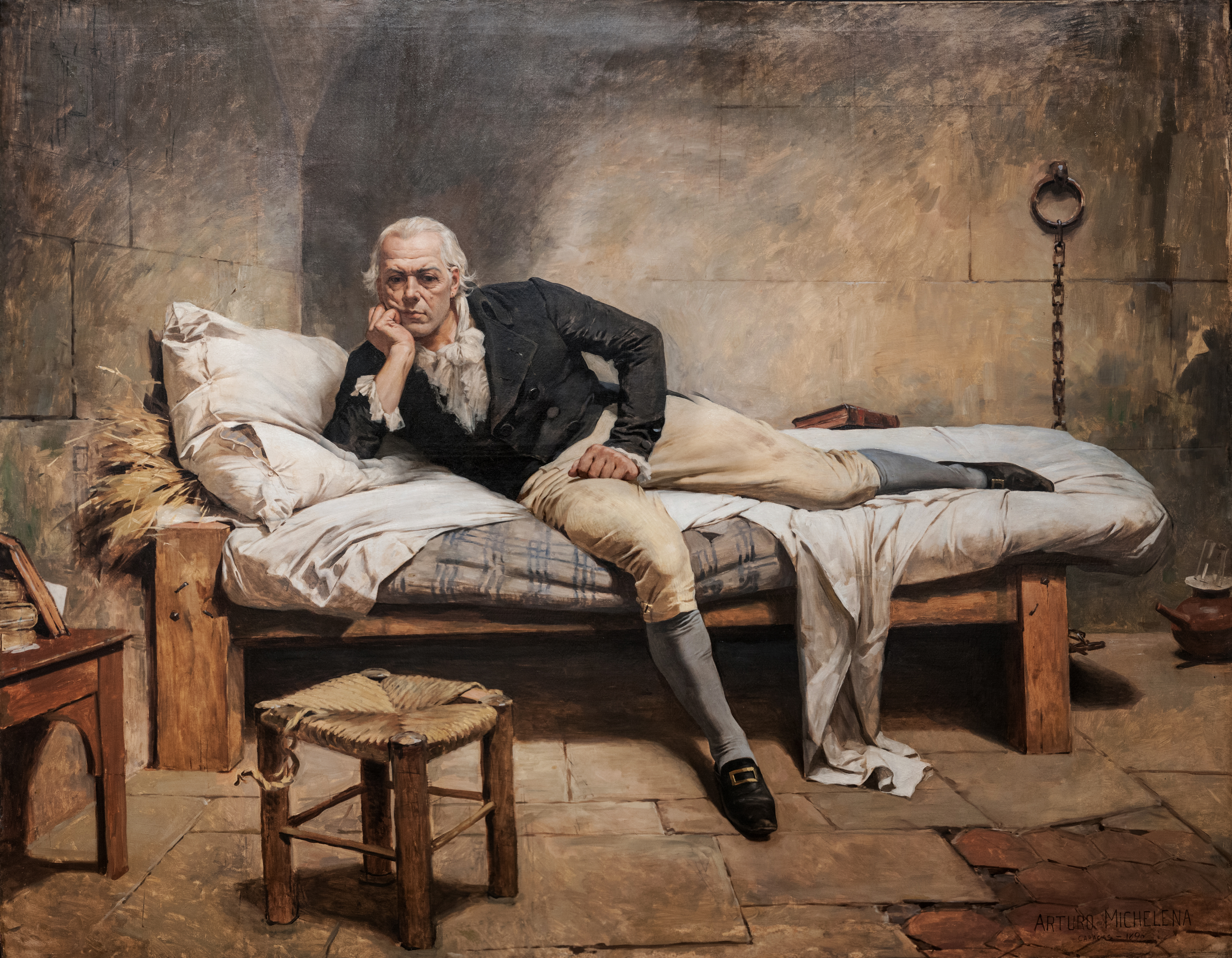
Miranda en La Carraca, by Arturo Michelena, 1896.

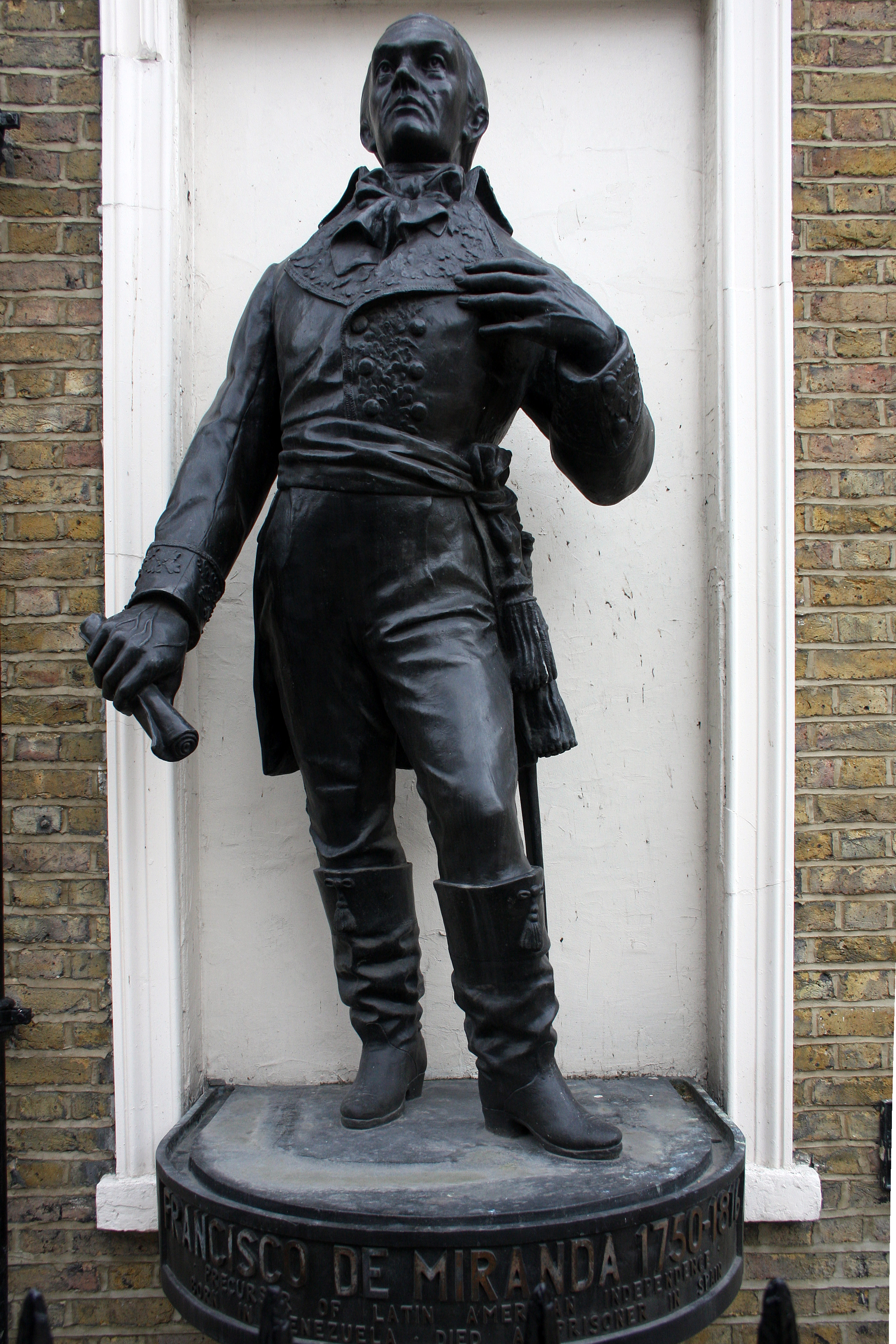
Statue of Francisco de Miranda in Fitzroy Street, London.

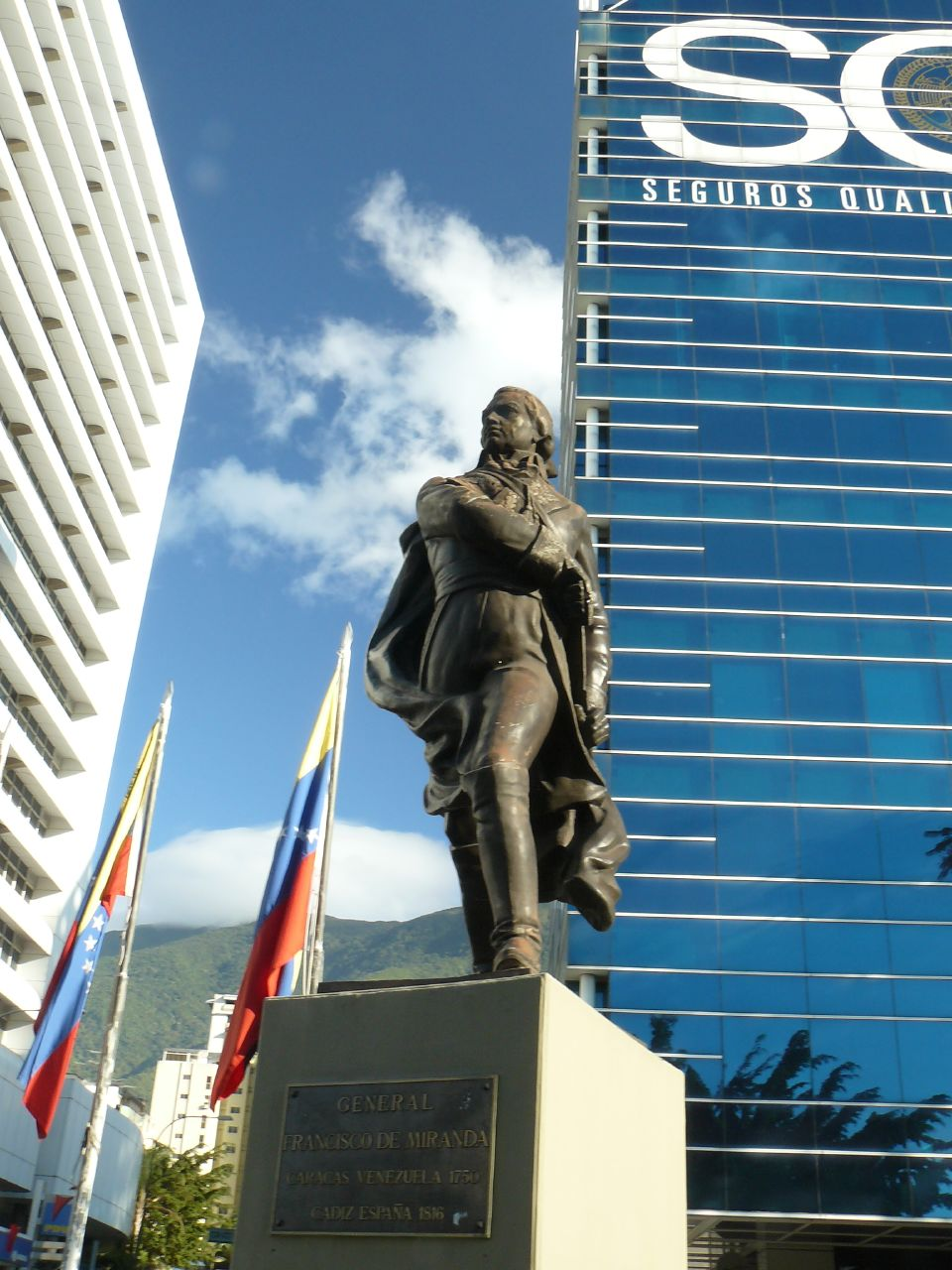
Statue of Francisco de Miranda in Caracas.

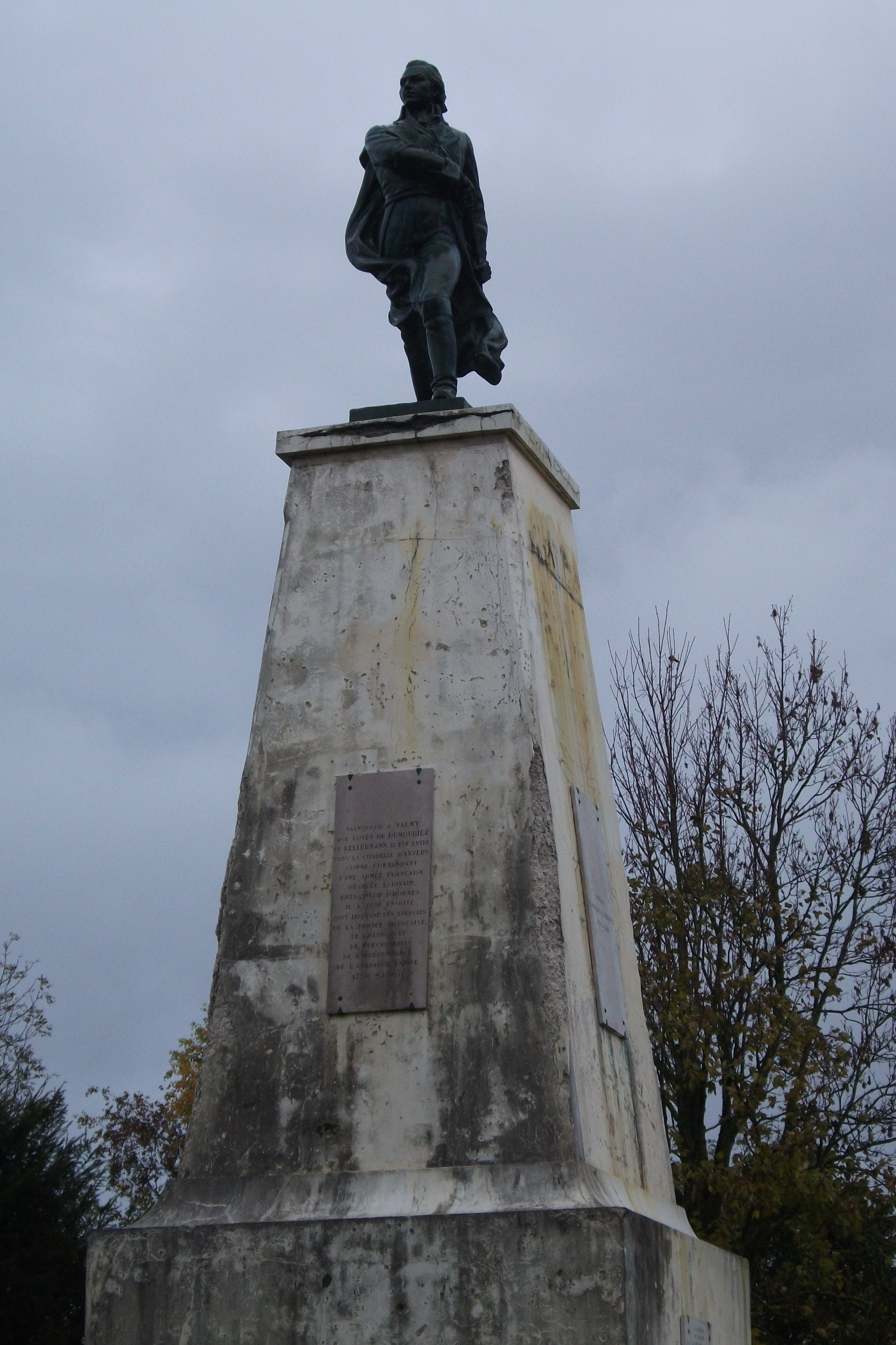
Statue of Miranda in Valmy.

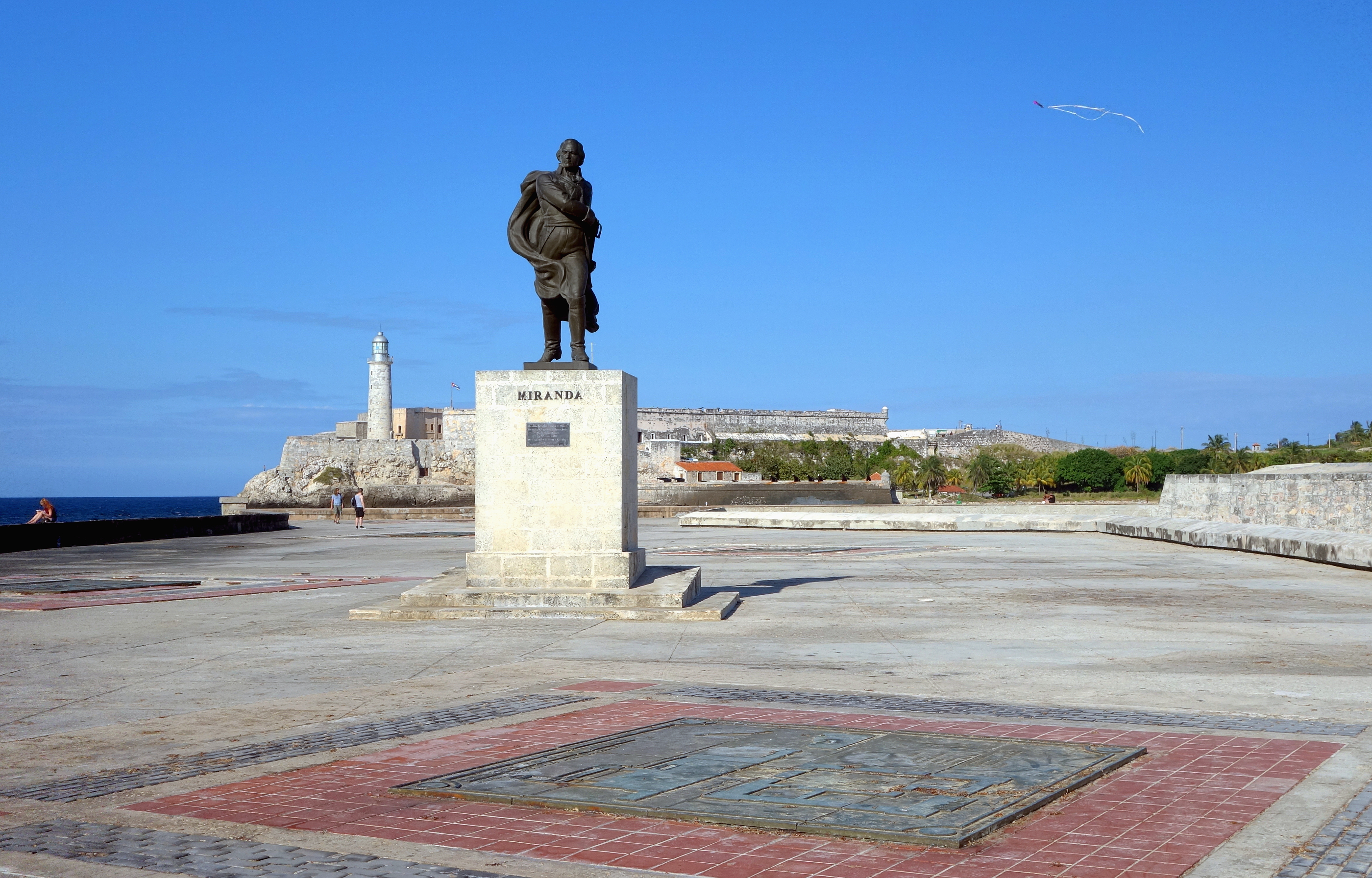
Statue of Miranda in Havana, Cuba.

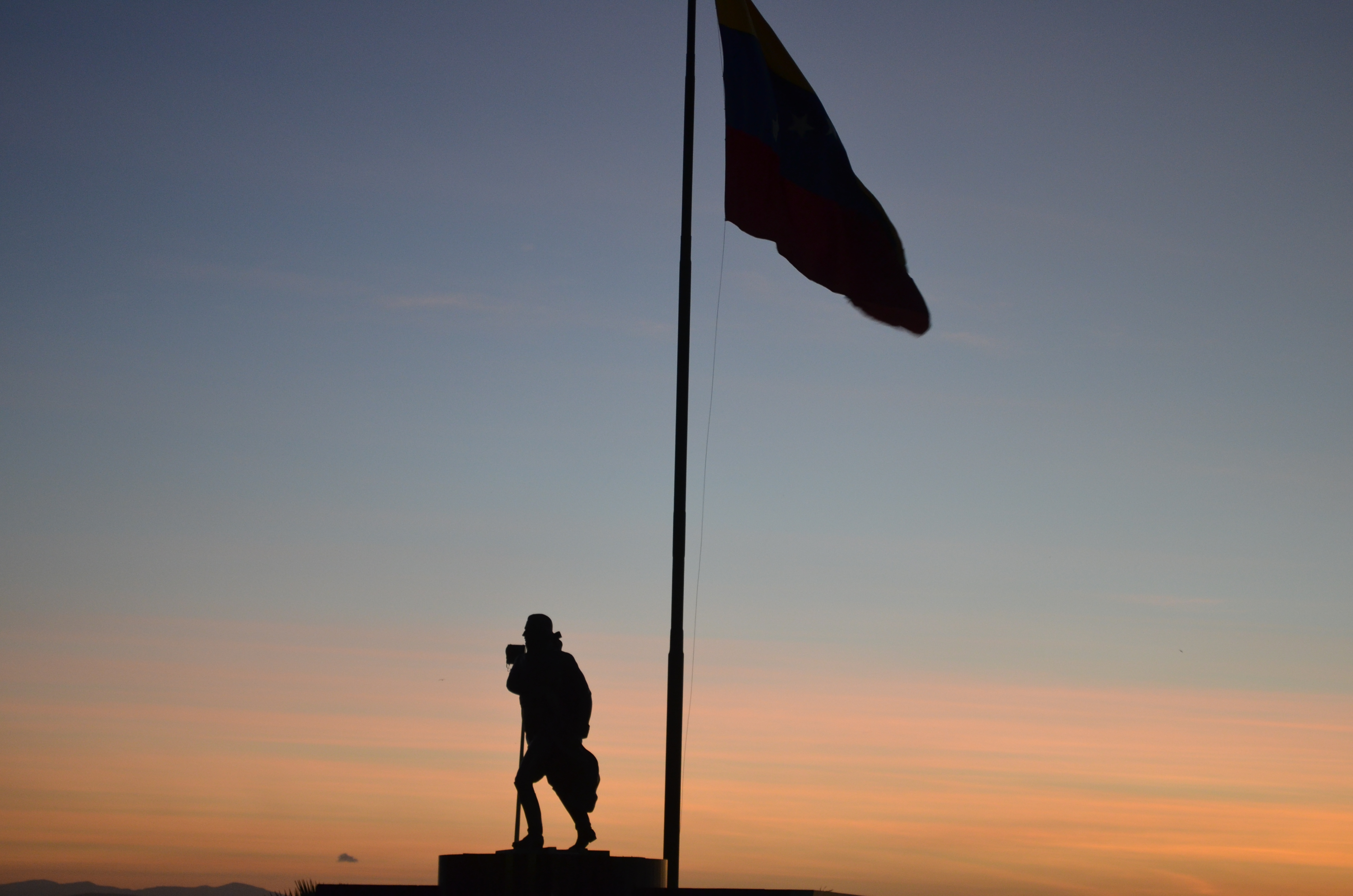
Monument to Francisco de Miranda in La Vela de Coro, Venezuela.

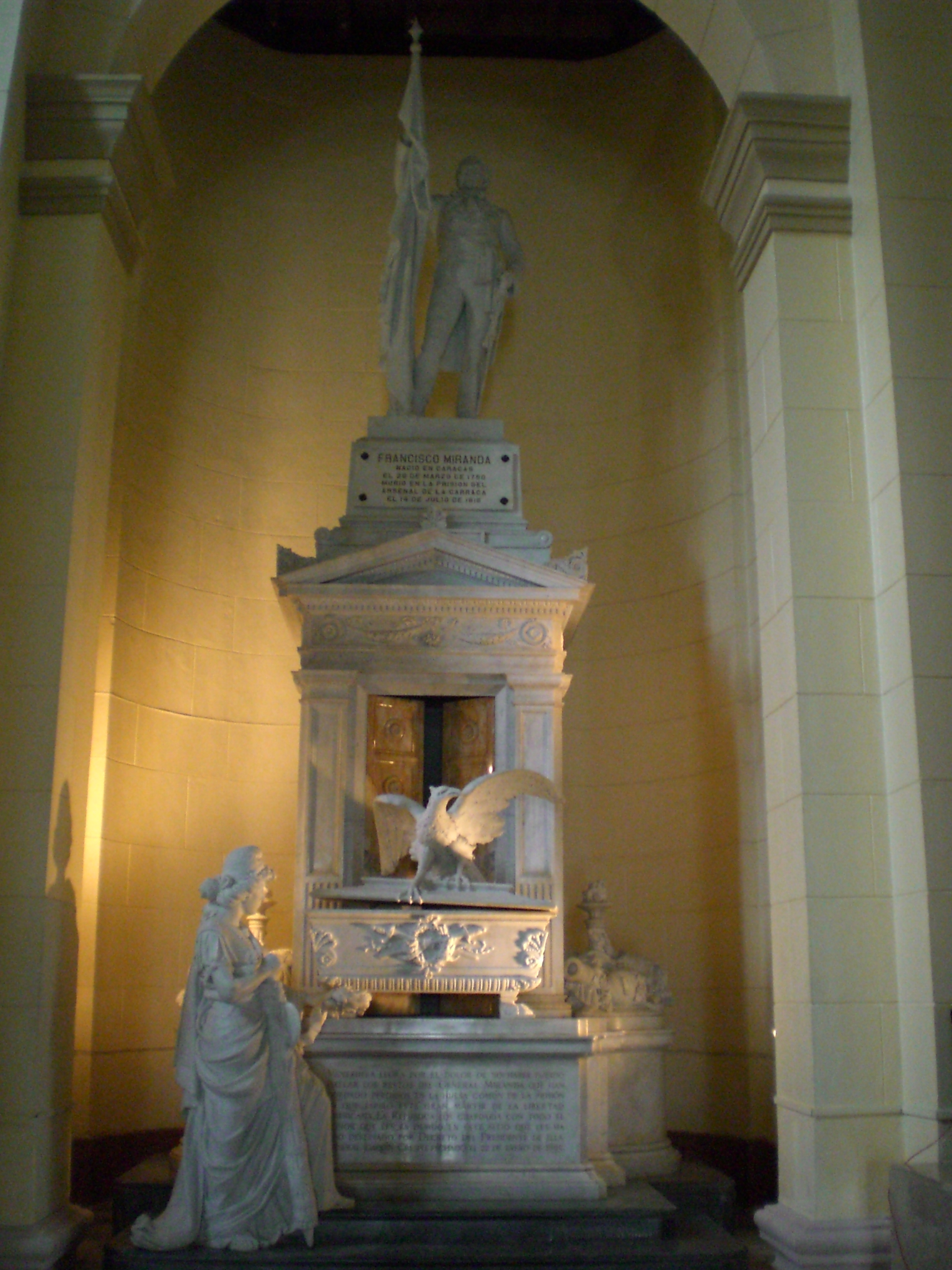
Monument to Francisco de Miranda. National Pantheon, Caracas, Venezuela.
