= Miranda Municipality =

Miranda Municipality may refer to:

- Miranda, Mato Grosso do Sul, Brazil
- Miranda, Cauca, Colombia

== Venezuela ==
- Miranda Municipality, Carabobo
- Miranda Municipality, Falcón
- Miranda Municipality, Mérida
- Miranda Municipality, Trujillo
- Miranda Municipality, Zulia, in Zulia

== See also ==
- Miranda (disambiguation)
- Francisco de Miranda Municipality (disambiguation)
