= Penal de las Cuatro Torres =

Coordinates: 36°29′53″N 6°10′32″W

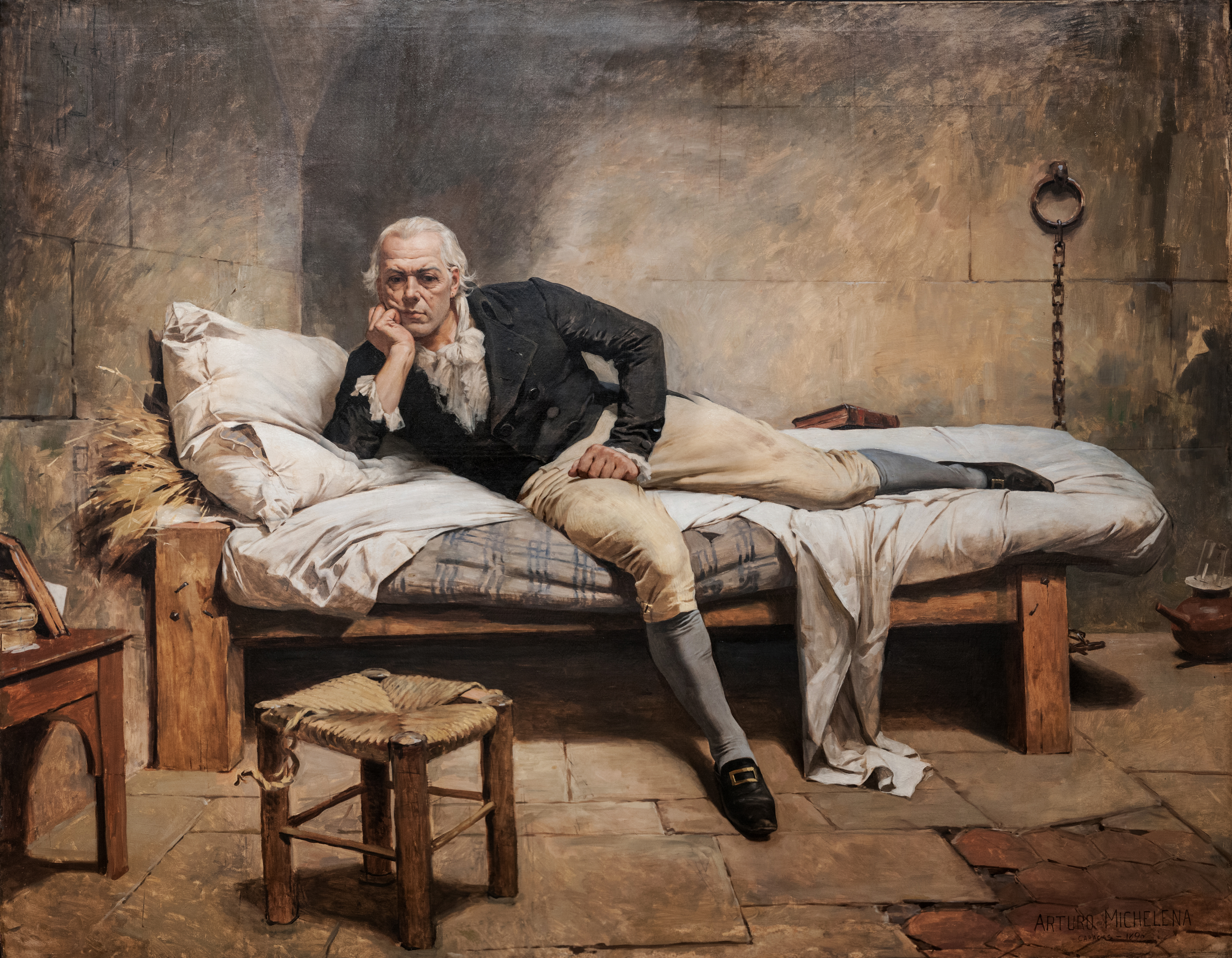

Penalty de las Cuatro Torres was a prison located in San Fernando in the Province of Cádiz, Andalusia, Spain.

Francisco de Miranda was imprisoned here and died in prison in 1816 while his case was still being processed.
