= Francisco de Miranda Municipality, Anzoátegui =

Francisco de Miranda Municipality Municipio Francisco de Miranda
- Municipality
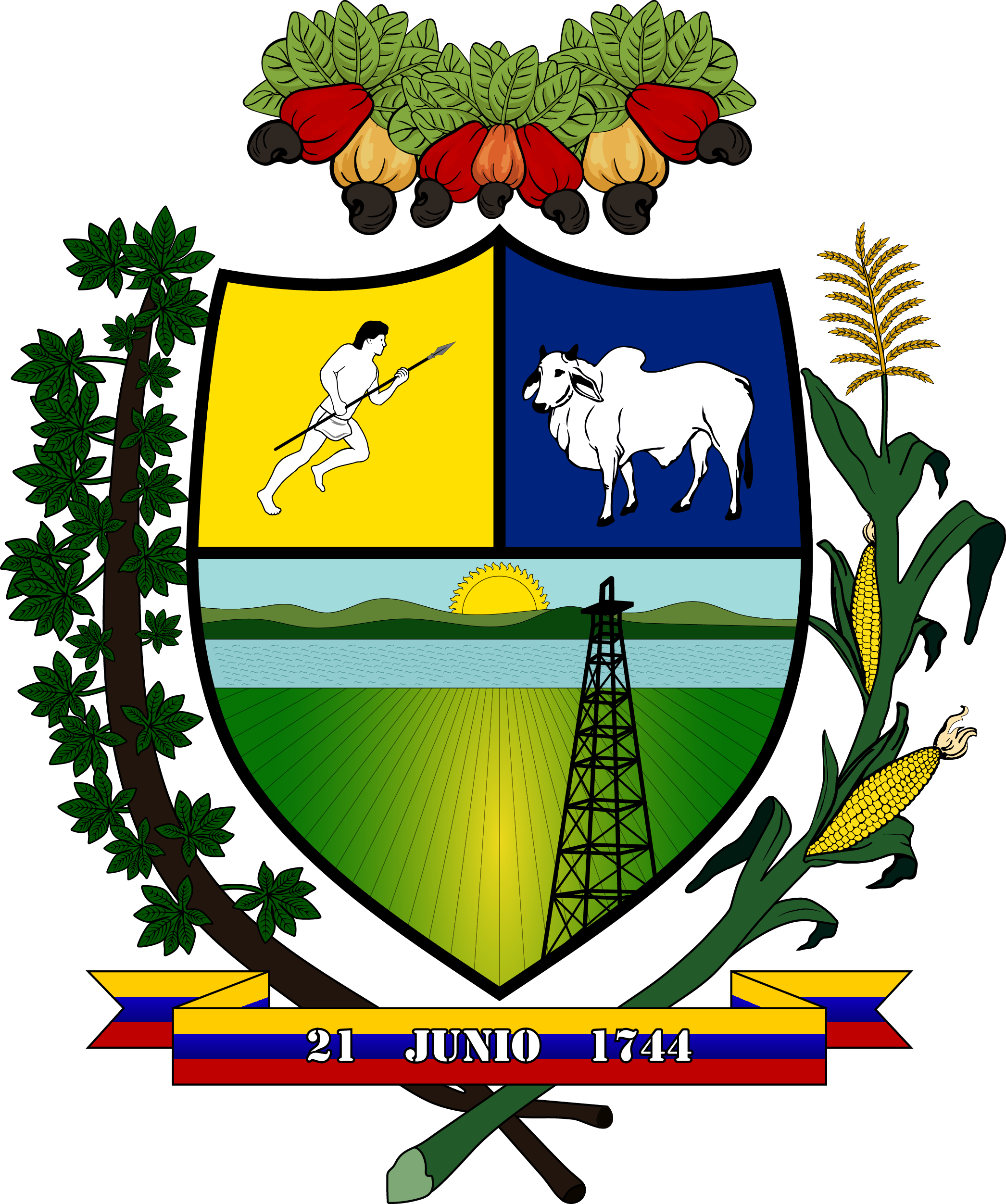
- Flag Coat of arms

- Location in Anzoátegui

- Location in Venezuela
- Coordinates: 8°34′03″N 64°18′50″W
- Country: Venezuela
- State: Anzoátegui

Government
  - Mayor: Angel Vázquez (PSUV)

Area
  - Total: 5,411.6 km^{2} (2,089.4 sq mi)

Population (2011)
  - Total: 43,173
  - Density: 7.9779/km^{2} (20.663/sq mi)
- Time zone: UTC−4 (VET)
- Area code(s): 0283
- Website: Official website

Francisco de Miranda is one of the 21 municipalities (municipios) that makes up the eastern Venezuelan state of Anzoátegui and, according to the 2011 census by the National Institute of Statistics of Venezuela, the municipality has a population of 43,173. The town of Pariaguán is the shire town of the Francisco de Miranda Municipality.

== Name ==
The municipality is one of several in Venezuela named "Francisco de Miranda Municipality" in honour of Venezuelan independence hero Francisco de Miranda.

== Demographics ==
The Francisco de Miranda Municipality, according to a 2007 population estimate by the National Institute of Statistics of Venezuela, has a population of 42,357 (up from 36,970 in 2000). This amounts to 2.9% of the state's population. The municipality's population density is 7.94 inhabitants per square kilometre (20.6/sq mi).

== Government ==
Tomás Bello, elected on 23 November 2008 with 62% of the vote. He replaced Lorenzo Emilio Rondon shortly after the elections. The municipality is divided into five parishes; Capital Francisco de Miranda, Atapirire, Boca del Pao, El Pao, and Múcura (created 27 June 1995).

== See also ==
- Miranda (disambiguation)
