= Miranda (surname) =

Miranda is a Maltese, Portuguese, Sephardic Jewish, and Spanish surname of Latin origin, meaning "worthy of admiration".

Notable people with the surname Miranda include:

== A ==
- Adolfo Miranda (born 1989), Spanish footballer
- Adriano Miranda (born 1989), Brazilian footballer
- Aeriél Miranda (born 1992), American actress
- Africa Miranda, American actress, model and celebrity
- Agustín Miranda (footballer, born 1930), Paraguayan football defender
- Agustín Miranda (footballer, born 1992), Uruguayan football midfielder
- Aída Miranda (born 1959), Puerto Rican softball player
- Alan Miranda, American computer game designer
- Albert Dalmau Miranda (born 1990), Spanish politician
- Alejo Miranda de Larra (born 1981), Spanish politician
- Alfonso Álvarez Miranda (1915–2003), Spanish economist and politician
- Alípio de Miranda-Ribeiro (1874–1939), Brazilian herpetologist and ichthyologist
- Álvaro de Miranda Neto (born 1973), Brazilian equestrian
- Álvaro Miranda Simavilla (born 1957), Spanish politician
- Ana María Miranda (born 1949), Chilean musician
- Ana Miranda (born 1951), Brazilian poet and novelist
- Ana Miranda Paz (born 1971), Spanish politician
- Anabela Miranda Rodrigues (born 1953), Portuguese politician
- Andrés Miranda Hernández (1934–2024), Spanish politician
- Ángel Miranda (born 1969), Puerto Rican baseball player
- Anthony Miranda (born 1961), American police officer
- Antônio Afonso de Miranda (1920–2021), Brazilian prelate
- Ariel Miranda (born 1989), Cuban baseball player
- Armando Barrientos Miranda
- Armando de Miranda (1904–1971), Portuguese film director, screenwriter, editor and producer
- Armando Miranda (1939-1980), Brazilian footballer
- Arturo Miranda (born 1971), Canadian diver and coach
- Aurora Miranda (1915–2005), Brazilian singer, dancer, and actress

== B ==
- Baptista Miranda (born 2002), Angolan YouTuber and digital influencer
- Bartholomew Basanta Miranda (1812–1885), Spanish politician
- Beatriz Miranda Galarza (born 1971), Ecuadorian researcher
- Ben R. Miranda (1949–2013), American politician
- Boris Miranda (1984–2021), Bolivian journalist
- Braian Miranda (born 1993), Argentinian footballer
- Bruno Miranda (born 1998), Bolivian footballer
- Bryce Miranda (born 1999), Indian footballer
- Byron Miranda, American journalist

== C ==
- Carlo Miranda (1912–1982), Italian mathematician
- Carlos Albizu Miranda (1920–1984), Puerto Rican educator
- Carlos de Miranda y Quartín, 4th Count of Casa Miranda (1895–1968), Spanish diplomat
- Carlos Eduardo Miranda (1962–2018), Brazilian record producer
- Carlos Miranda (1945–2016), Spanish composer, pianist, conductor, and actor
- Carlos Miranda (actor) (born 1984), American actor
- Carlos Miranda (judoka) (born 1954), Puerto Rican judoka
- Carlos Miranda Miranda
- Carmel Miranda, Sri Lankan writer and novelist
- Carmelo Miranda (born 1969), Spanish cyclist
- Carmen Miranda (1909–1955), Brazilian singer
- Carmen Miranda (volleyball) (born 1975), Spanish volleyball player
- Carolina A. Miranda, columnist for the Los Angeles Times
- Carolina Miranda (actress) (born 1989), Mexican television actress
- Carolina Miranda (footballer) (born 1982), Spanish football midfielder
- Catarina Miranda (born 1990), Portuguese singer and songwriter
- Catherine Miranda (born 1964), American politician
- Cecilia Miranda de Carvalho (1913–2011), Brazilian singer
- Chari Gómez Miranda (1930–2011), Spanish journalist and TV presenter
- Chañaral Ortega-Miranda (born 1973), Chilean composer of classical music
- Chito Miranda (born 1976), Filipino musician
- Chyno Miranda (born 1984), Venezuelan singer
- Cindy Miranda (born 1990), Filipino actress
- Claudia Miranda (born 1968), Chilean dancer
- Claudio Miranda (born 1965), Chilean-born American cinematographer
- Clifford Miranda (born 1982), Indian footballer and coach
- Concha Valdés Miranda (1928–2017), Cuban songwriter and musician
- Conrado Miranda (1928–2021), Salvadoran footballer
- Constancio Miranda Weckmann (born 1952), Mexican Roman Catholic archbishop
- Constantino Miranda (1925–1999), Spanish long-distance and steeplechase runner
- Cyril Miranda (born 1985), French cross-country skier
- César Miranda, Secretary of Justice of Puerto Rico

== D ==
- Damir Miranda (born 1985), Bolivian footballer
- Danilo Miranda (born 1977), Chilean footballer
- Danny Miranda (1978–2026), Cuban baseball player
- David Martins Miranda (1936–2015), Brazilian pastor
- David Miranda (cyclist) (born 1942), Salvadoran cyclist
- David Miranda (politician) (1985–2023), Brazilian politician
- Deborah A. Miranda (born 1961), Native American writer, poet, and professor of English
- Denok Miranda (born 1982), Filipino basketball player
- Diamantino Miranda (born 1959), Portuguese footballer
- Diego Arias de Miranda (1845–1929), Spanish politician
- Diego Miranda (born 1986), Paraguayan footballer
- Diego Miranda Méndez (born 1990), Costa Rican historian and politician
- Donald Miranda (born 1972), Italian diver
- David Martins Miranda (1936–2015), Brazilian pastor
- David Miranda (cyclist) (born 1942), Salvadoran cyclist
- David Miranda (politician) (1985–2023), Brazilian politician
- Denok Miranda (born 1982), Filipino basketball player

== E ==
- Edgardo Miranda-Rodriguez (born 1970), Nuyorican writer and artist
- Edison Miranda (born 1981), Colombian boxer
- Eduardo Morales Miranda (1910–2012), Chilean rector
- Eduardo Reck Miranda (born 1963), Brazilian music composer and scientist
- Edwin Miranda (born 1981), Salvadoran footballer
- Elier Miranda Mesa (born 1993), Cuban chess grandmaster
- Elsa Miranda (1922–2007), Puerto Rican-born Argentinian actress
- Emanuel Tavares Miranda (1648–1706), Portuguese sailor
- Emilse Miranda Munive (born 1971), Mexican politician
- Erick Miranda (born 1971), Guatemalan footballer
- Érika Miranda (born 1987), Brazilian judoka
- Erma Hoag Miranda (1883–1964), American singer and composer
- Ernesto Miranda (1941–1976), American criminal and subject of a United States Supreme Court case
- Ernesto Álvarez Miranda, Prime Minister of Peru from 2025 to 2026
- Esmênia Miranda, Brazilian geographer and politician
- Eurico Miranda (1944–2019), Brazilian politician and sporting director
- Eva Miranda (born 1973), Spanish mathematician

== F ==
- Fabrizio de Miranda (1926–2015), Italian engineer
- Facundo González Miranda (born 1953), Mexican politician
- Fátima Miranda, Spanish singer and researcher
- Federico Miranda (born 1976), Costa Rican musician
- Felipe B. Miranda, Filipino political scientist
- Felipe Miranda (born 1986), Chilean water skier
- Fernando Álvarez de Miranda (1924–2016), Spanish politician, lawyer and university professor
- Fernando Miranda y Casellas (1842-1925), Spanish-American sculptor
- Fernando Miranda (sport shooter) (born 1939), Puerto Rican sports shooter
- Fernando Cornejo Miranda (born 1995), Chilean footballer
- Fernando Miranda (footballer) (born 1997), Argentine footballer
- Flix Miranda, Puerto Rican-American electrical engineer
- Florentina Gómez Miranda (1912–2011), Argentine politician
- Fran Miranda (born 1988), Spanish footballer
- Francesca Miranda (born 1957), Salvadoran fashion designer
- Francisco Alía Miranda (born 1960), Spanish historian
- Francisco Cavalcanti Pontes de Miranda (1892–1979), Brazilian judge and diplomat
- Francisco de Miranda (1750–1816), Venezuelan military leader
- Francisco de Sá de Miranda (1481–1558), Portuguese poet
- Francisco Miranda (footballer) (born 1941), Paraguayan footballer
- Francisco Miranda Concha (1869–1950), Spanish trade unionist
- Francisco Miranda da Costa Lobo (1864–1945), Portuguese astronomer
- Francisco Palacios Miranda, 19th-century governor and comandante principal of Baja California Sur
- Francisco Teixeira de Miranda, Brazilian slave trader
- Franco Miranda (born 1985), Argentine footballer
- Frank de Miranda (1913–1986), Dutch sculptor, psychologist, and publicist

== G ==
- Gabriel Miranda (born 1968), Uruguayan-Venezuelan footballer
- Gabriela Sodi Miranda (born 1959), Mexican politician
- Gadiel Miranda (born 1986), Puerto Rican judoka
- Gary Miranda (born 1939), American poet
- Gerardo Miranda (born 1956), Spanish footballer
- Giovanni Miranda (fl. 1500s), Italian Hispanist and grammarian
- Glenda Miranda (born 1985), Ecuadorian judoka
- Glorioso Miranda (born 1961), Filipino general
- Gonzalo Miranda (born 1979), Chilean racing cyclist
- Gonzalo Miranda (squash player) (born 1989), Argentine squash player
- Guadalupe Miranda (1810–1888), Mexican politician
- Guido Miranda (1925–2019), Costa Rican civil servant and medical doctor
- Gutierre de Miranda (fl. 1570s), Colonial governor of Florida

== H ==
- Harold Hopkins Miranda (born 1973), Puerto Rican musician
- Héctor Félix Miranda (1941–1988), Mexican journalist
- Helen Miranda Wilson (born 1948), American painter
- Henrique Miranda (footballer, born 1993), Brazilian football left-back player
- Henrique Miranda (footballer, born 2006), Brazilian football attacking midfielder for Juventus-SP
- Herminio Miranda (born 1985), Paraguayan footballer
- Hernando de Miranda (died 1593), Spanish conquistador and explorer
- Holly Miranda (born 1982), American musician
- Homero de Miranda Leão (1913–1987), Brazilian politician and poet
- Horacio Miranda (born 1931), Filipino sports shooter
- Hugo Miranda (cyclist) (born 1925), Chilean cyclist
- Hugo Miranda (footballer) (born 1980), Paraguayan footballer
- Hugo Miranda Ramírez (1921–2011), Chilean lawyer, politician, and diplomat
- Hugo Sánchez Miranda (born 1968), Mexican politician

== I ==
- Ietje Paalman-de Miranda (1936–2020), Dutch mathematician and professor
- Irma Miranda (born 1996), Mexican model and TV host
- Isa Miranda (1905–1982), Italian actress
- Isabel Miranda de Wallace (1951–2025), Mexican educator and social activist
- Ismael Miranda (born 1950, Puerto Rican musician
- Iván Miranda (born 1980), Peruvian tennis player

== J ==
- Javier Miranda (1954–2019), Spanish businessman
- Jeffry Miranda (born 2002), Honduran footballer
- Jennifer Miranda (born 1986), Spanish boxer
- Jessica Miranda, American politician from Ohio
- Jhon Miranda (born 1997), Colombian footballer
- Joaquim Miranda (1950–2006), Portuguese politician
- Joaquim Miranda Sarmento (born 1978), Portuguese politician and economist
- Jose Miranda (politician) (born 1985), American politician
- Jose Miranda (soccer), American soccer player and coach
- Joseph Miranda (1923–2014), American mobster
- Joseph Miranda (game designer), American game designer
- Josete Miranda (born 1998), Equatoguinean footballer
- José Miranda (baseball) (born 1998), Puerto Rican baseball player
- José Miranda (footballer) (born 1986), Cuban footballer
- Jose Miranda (politician) (born 1985), American politician in Pennsylvania
- Jose Miranda (soccer) (born c. 1972), American soccer player and coach
- José Salvador Miranda (runner) (born 1971), Mexican middle-distance runner
- José Bragança de Miranda (born 1953), Portuguese sociologist
- José del Rosario Miranda (1832–1903), Paraguayan politician
- José Edmar Brito Miranda (1934–2021), Brazilian lawyer and politician
- José Porfirio Miranda (1924–2001), Mexican theologian and philosopher
- João Bernardo de Miranda (born 1952), Angolan politician
- Juan Carreño de Miranda (1614–1685), Spanish painter
- Juan Durán de Miranda (fl. 1664–75), Spanish governor of New Mexico
- Juan Fernández Miranda (born 1974), Argentine rugby player
- Juan García de Miranda (1677–1749), Spanish painter
- Juan Miranda (baseball) (born 1983), Cuban baseball player
- Juan Miranda (footballer) (born 2000), Spanish footballer
- Juan Miranda (runner) (born 1928), Argentine middle-distance runner
- Juan Q. Miranda (1912–1985), Bicolano congressman and war leader
- Juana Briones de Miranda (1802–1889), Californian businesswoman
- Juana Miranda (1842–1914), Ecuadorian obstetrician
- Julio César Miranda (born 1980), Mexican boxer
- Julio Miranda (1946–2021), Argentine politician
- Julius Caesar de Miranda (1906–1956), Surinamese jurist and politician
- Júlio Miranda Calha (1947–2020), Portuguese politician

== K ==
- Karina Miranda, Chilean Air Force combat aviator
- Karl Miranda (born 1957), Filipino lawyer, academic, and jurist
- Katherine Miranda (born 1986), Colombian politician
- Katherine Miranda Chang (born 1994), Peruvian tennis player
- Katrina Miranda, American biochemist
- Keiye Miranda, Filipino painter
- Kelvin Miranda (born 1999), Filipino actor, model, and singer

== L ==
- Lalla Miranda (1874–1944), Australian opera singer
- Lauri Miranda Silva (born 1986), Brazilian professor
- Leandro Costa Miranda Moraes (born 1983), Brazilian footballer
- Leandro Gil Miranda da Silva (born 1978), Brazilian footballer
- Leonel Miranda (born 1994), Argentine footballer
- Lin-Manuel Miranda (born 1980), American songwriter, actor, filmmaker and librettist
- Liz Miranda (born 1981), American politician
- Lorena Miranda (born 1991), Spanish water polo player
- Lucas Miranda (1921–2006), Brazilian footballer
- Luis A. Miranda Jr. (born 1954), Puerto Rican political strategist, philanthropist, and advocacy consultant
- Luis de Miranda (born 1971), French philosopher and novelist
- Luís Mário Miranda da Silva (born 1976), Brazilian footballer
- Luis Miranda (Brazilian politician) (born 1980), Brazilian politician
- Luis Miranda (Canadian politician), Canadian politician
- Luis Miranda (footballer) (born 1997), Colombian footballer
- Luis Miranda (painter) (1932–2016), Ecuadorian artist
- Luis Miranda Casañas (1937–2019), Puerto Rican businessman
- Luis Miranda Junco (1919–1969), Spanish footballer
- Luis Miranda Rivera (born 1954), Puerto Rican Bishop of Fajardo-Humacao
- Luiza Miranda (born 2010), Brazilian rhythmic gymnast
- Luz Martinez-Miranda, American-Puerto Rican physicist

== M ==
- Macarena Miranda (born 1971), Chilean tennis player
- Manuel Miranda (1959–2025), American attorney
- Marcelo Miranda (footballer) (born 1967), Chilean footballer and manager
- Marcelo Miranda (politician) (born 1961), Brazilian politician
- Marcelo Miranda Soares (1938–2026), Brazilian politician
- Márcio Miranda (born 1942), Brazilian chess player
- Marco Miranda (born 1998), Swiss ice hockey player
- Marcos Miranda (born 1992), Brazilian footballer
- Margarita Miranda Bordoy (1919–1979), Spanish sporting director
- Marie Lynn Miranda (born 1963), American data scientist and academic administrator
- Marino Miranda Salgado (born 1962), Mexican politician
- Mario Miranda (1926–2011), Indian cartoonist
- Mario Miranda (boxer) (born 1960), Colombian boxer
- Marley Marshall-Miranda (born 2002), English footballer
- Marlui Miranda (born 1949), Brazilian ethnomusicologist
- Marta Fernández Miranda de Batista (1917–2006), First Lady of Cuba
- María Feliciana de los Ángeles Miranda (died 1812), Salvadoran rebel
- Matías Miranda (born 2000), Argentine footballer
- Máximo Pacheco Miranda (1905–1992), Mexican muralist
- Megan Miranda, American writer
- Meilin Miranda, American novelist
- Melisa Miranda (born 1988), Chilean tennis player
- Melissa Miranda, American chef and restaurateur
- Michael Miranda (born 1990), Filipino basketball player
- Michele Miranda (1896–1973), Italian-American mobster
- Miguel Cortés Miranda (1984–2025), Mexican bacteriologist, parasitologist and serial killer
- Miguel Darío Miranda y Gómez (1895–1986), Mexican Catholic prelate
- Miguel Miranda (1966–2021), Peruvian footballer
- Miguel Miranda (basketball) (born 1978), Portuguese basketball player
- Miguel Ángel Aguilar Miranda (1939–2025), Ecuadorian Roman Catholic prelate
- Miguel Ángel Miranda (born 1983), Venezuelan boxer
- Mike Miranda (BMX rider) (born 1963), American bicycle motocross rider
- Miriam Miranda, Honduran human and environmental rights activist
- Mónica de Miranda (born 1976), Portuguese visual artist and researcher
- Montxu Miranda (born 1976), Spanish pole vaulter
- Monty Miranda, American film director

== N ==
- Nely Miranda (born 1972), Mexican swimmer and politician
- Nemesio Miranda (born 1949), Filipino painter and sculptor
- Neymer Miranda (born 1985), Colombian footballer
- Nicolás Fernández Miranda (born 1972), Argentine rugby player
- Nicolás Zúñiga y Miranda (1865–1925), Mexican politician
- Nilmário Miranda (born 1947), Brazilian politician
- Nina Miranda (born 1970), Brazilian singer and songwriter
- Nina Miranda (Uruguayan singer) (1925–2012)
- Norberto Miranda Madrid (1965–2009), Mexican editor and radio show host

== O ==
- Octavio Salazar Miranda (1952–2024), Peruvian politician
- Olayinka Miranda Burney-Nicol (born 1927), Sierra Leonean visual artist
- Osvaldo Miranda (actor) (1915–2011), Argentine actor
- Osvaldo Miranda (fencer) (born 1887), Cuban fencer
- Osvaldo Miranda (footballer) (born 1984), Argentine footballer

== P ==
- Pablo De Miranda (born 1986), Argentine footballer
- Pablo Miranda (born 1984), Argentine footballer
- Paterno Miranda (born 1930), Filipino sports shooter
- Patricia Miranda (born 1979), American freestyle wrestler
- Paul Miranda (born 1976), American football player
- Paulo Miranda (footballer, born 1974), Brazilian football manager and former player
- Paulo Miranda (footballer, born 1988), Brazilian footballer
- Pedro Miranda (born 1948), Mexican long-distance runner
- Pedro Miranda (baseball) (1922–2002), Colombian baseball player
- Pedro Rodriguez de Miranda (1696–1766), Spanish painter
- Perseo Miranda (born 1958), Italian musician
- Pia Miranda (born 1973), Australian actress
- Pier Miranda Ferraro (1924–2008), Italian opera singer

== R ==
- Rafa Miranda (born 1996), Portuguese footballer
- Rafael Campo Miranda (1918–2024), Colombian songwriter and musician
- Rafael Cancel Miranda (1930–2020), Puerto Rican activist and militant
- Rafael Miranda da Conceição (born 1984), Brazilian footballer (born 1984), Brazilian footballer
- Rafael Miranda (born 1984), Brazilian footballer
- Raising Miranda, Television series
- Ramón Miranda Ampuero (born 1926), Peruvian politician and general
- Raphael Miranda (born 1977), American journalist
- Renan Miranda (born 1986), Brazilian footballer
- Richard Garcia Miranda (born 1975), Brazilian footballer
- Ricardo Miranda (born 1976), Canadian politician and trade unionist
- Ricardo Miranda Zuñiga (born 1971), American new media artist
- Richard Miranda (politician) (born 1956), American politician
- Robert Miranda (actor) (born 1952), American film and television actor
- Robert Miranda (bishop) (born 1952), Roman Catholic bishop
- Roberta Miranda (born 1956), Brazilian singer
- Roberto de Miranda (born 1947), Cuban professor
- Roberto Miranda (born 1943), Brazilian footballer
- Roberto Miranda Moreno (born 1955), Mexican General officer
- Roderick Miranda (born 1991), Portuguese footballer
- Rodolfo Miranda, Spanish physicist
- Rogelio Miranda (born 1922), Bolivian general and diplomat
- Ronaldo Miranda (born 1948), Brazilian composer
- Roque Centurión Miranda (1900–1960), Paraguayan actor and director
- Roxana Miranda (born 1967), Chilean activist and politician

== S ==
- Sacuntala de Miranda (1934–2008), Portuguese historian and political activist
- Salvador Miranda (boxer) (born 1949), Nicaraguan boxer
- Salvador Miranda (historian) (1939–2024), American bibliographer, librarian and historian
- Salvador Miranda (runner) (born 1971), Mexican former middle distance runner
- Sandy Miranda (born 1996), Venezuelan actor
- Santiago Creel Miranda (born 1954), Mexican lawyer and politician
- Santiago Rodríguez-Miranda (born 1940), Spanish politician
- Sebastián Miranda (born 1980), Chilean footballer
- Shereen Miranda (born 1982), British singer, actress, author, presenter
- Shirley Miranda-Rodriguez, American photographer
- Sol Miranda, American actress
- Soledad Miranda (1943–1970), Spanish actress and pop singer
- Stanton Miranda, American drummer
- Sthephanie Miranda (born 1993), Puerto Rican beauty pageant titleholder
- Sula Miranda (born 1963), Brazilian singer

== T ==
- Tânia Miranda (born 1958), Brazilian sprinter
- Teodoro Enrique Pino Miranda (1946–2020), Mexican Catholic priest
- Teresa Cupertino de Miranda (1946–2025), Portuguese motor rally driver
- Ariadna Thalía Sodi Miranda (born 1971), Mexican singer and actress
- Thammy Miranda (born 1982), Brazilian actor, reporter and politician
- Torcuato Fernández-Miranda (1915–1980), Spanish politician

== U ==
- Ubaldo Miranda (born 1931), Brazilian footballer

== V ==
- Valentina Miranda (born 2000), Chilean political activist
- Valeria Miranda (born 1992), Mexican footballer
- Vera Lúcia de Miranda Guarda (born 1963), Brazilian human rights activist
- Vic Miranda, American football player
- Vicenta García Miranda (1816–1877), Spanish Romantic poet
- Víctor Miranda (born 1982), Panamanian footballer
- Victoria Miranda (born 2000), Argentine field hockey player
- Vitor Miranda (born 1979), Brazilian kickboxer and mixed martial artist

== W ==
- Wayne Miranda (born 1957), Australian rugby league footballer
- William Miranda Marín (1940–2010), United States general
- William Miranda Torres, Puerto Rican politician
- Willy Miranda (1926–1996), Cuban baseball player
- Willy Miranda (coach) (born 1947), American former sports coach

== Y ==
- Yerisbel Miranda Llanes (born 1987), Cuban chess player
- Yesenia Miranda (born 1994), Salvadoran racewalker

== Z ==
- Zito (footballer, born 1932) (José Ely de Miranda, 1932–2015), Brazilian footballer

== See also ==
- Miranda (disambiguation)
- Miranda (given name)
