= Hugo Sánchez (disambiguation) =

Hugo Sánchez (Hugo Sánchez Márquez, born 1958) is a Mexican football player

Hugo Sánchez is also the name of:

- Hugo Sánchez Bonilla (born 1940), Costa Rican artist
- Hugo Sánchez Flores in 2014 Copa de España de Futsal
- Hugo Sánchez (footballer, born 1984) (1984–2014), sports commentator (son of Hugo Sánchez Márquez)
- Hugo Sánchez Guerrero (born 1981), Mexican football player
- Hugo Sánchez Miranda (born 1968), Mexican politician
- Hugo Sánchez Solari (1935–2024), Peruvian politician, mayor of San Borja, Lima

== See also ==
- Hugo Sanches (born 1994), Brazilian footballer
