= David Miranda =

David Miranda may refer to:

- David Martins Miranda (1936–2015), Brazilian pastor
- David Miranda (cyclist) (born 1942), Salvadoran cyclist
- David Miranda (politician) (1985–2023), Brazilian politician
