= Hugo Miranda =

Hugo Miranda may refer to:

- Hugo Miranda (cyclist) (born 1925), Chilean cyclist
- Hugo Miranda (footballer) (born 1980), Paraguayan footballer
- Hugo Miranda Ramírez (1921–2011), Chilean lawyer, politician, and diplomat
- Hugo Sánchez Miranda (born 1968), Mexican politician
