= José Miranda =

José Miranda may refer to:

- José Miranda (baseball) (born 1998), Puerto Rican baseball player
- José Miranda (footballer) (born 1986), Cuban footballer
- Jose Miranda (politician) (born 1985), American politician in Pennsylvania
- Jose Miranda (soccer) (born c. 1972), American soccer player and coach
- José Salvador Miranda (runner) (born 1971), Mexican middle-distance runner

== See also ==
- José Luis de Jesús Miranda (1946–2013), leader of the Creciendo en Gracia sect
- Josete Miranda (born 1998), Spanish footballer
- San José de Miranda, a town in Colombia
- Miranda (surname)
