= Flix =

Flix may refer to:

== Computing ==
- Flix (programming language), a functional programming language
- South Florida Internet Exchange (FL-IX)
- Flix, a video encoding and publishing software from On2 Technologies

== Entertainment ==
- Flix (TV network), a subscription television channel owned by Showtime
- Trix & Flix, official mascots for UEFA Euro 2008

== Other uses ==
- Flix, Spain, a town in Catalonia, Spain.
- Flix SE, German mobility service provider
  - FlixBus
  - FlixTrain
- Flix Miranda, electrical engineer
- An alternate spelling of "flicks", a slang term for films
