= Novaro (singer) =

Italian-Venezuelan singer and composer

- Birth name: Jeyzer Leonardo Novaro Rodríguez
- Born: 1 September 1974 (age 50); Maracaibo, Venezuela
- Genres: Reggaeton; Latin pop
- Occupation: Singer
- Instrument: Vocals
- Years active: 2017–present

Jeyzer Novaro (born 1 September 1974), better known as Novaro, is an Italian-Venezuelan singer and composer of urban and pop music, founder of the Novaro Records studio and the food company Novaro Foods.

He has occupied the first positions of Monitor Latino on several occasions. He was awarded as "Artist with the greatest international projection" by the Mara de Oro and International foundation in 2020.

== Musical career ==
He ventures into music motivated by his musical family roots. In 2005, he opened his own studio and music production company Novaro Records, making unpublished productions for himself and many other artists such as Anabella Queen. In 2007, he began classes with Professor Aldemar Torres (director of Vocal Song), who taught him to educate his voice with vocal techniques, singing and music theory for 10 years.

At the end of 2017, he made his first production entitled "Bésame" at the Novaro Records studios, with the participation of Colombian producer Francisco Romero, who came from working with renowned artists in his native country. The song was positioned at number 1 on the Monitor Latino chart in Venezuela.

Between 2018 and 2019, Novaro focuses on making more unpublished productions and Covers of other artists, that is when he launches "Morena Mia" on the market, managing to position himself in the first place of the radio.

In 2020, he received the Mara de Oro award, an award given as a Songwriter with International Projection. Also in this period, his last single that year was "Locos en la luna", and he decides to release his first urban genre album, Te lo Dije.

== Personal life ==
He has three sons: Esteban, Sebastián and Salvador. He founded and runs Novaro Foods, a food company.

== Discography ==
=== Studio albums ===
- 2020: Te Lo Dije

=== Singles ===
- 2018: Bésame
- 2019: Morena Mía
- 2020: Locos en la Luna

== Awards and honours ==
- 2020: Mara de Oro as Songwriter of International Projection
