= Mirandinha =

Mirandinha may refer to:

- Francisco Teixeira de Miranda, also known as Mirandinha, Brazilian slave trader in 1830s-1840s Angola
- Mirandinha (footballer, born 1952), Sebastião Miranda da Silva Filho, Brazilian forward who played in 1974 FIFA World Cup
- Mirandinha (footballer, born 1959), Francisco Ernandi Lima da Silva, the first Brazilian to play in English football in 1987
- Mirandinha (footballer, born 1970), Isaílton Ferreira da Silva, Brazilian winger
- Mirandinha (footballer, born 1999), Luiz Carlos Paulino de Carvalho, Brazilian forward
