= Carpo (surname) =

Carpo is a surname. Notable people with the name include:

- Arsénio Pompílio Pompeu de Carpo (1792–1869), Portuguese slave trader
- Daniel Carpo (born 1984), Romanian rugby union footballer
- Mario Carpo (born 1958), Italian architectural historian

== See also ==
- Carpo (disambiguation)
