= Geeta Aiyer =

Indian entrepreneur and business leader

- Born: 1958 (age 66–67); Chennai, India
- Education: Delhi University (Honors BA); Delhi University (MA); Harvard Business School (MBA)
- Known for: Founder and President of Boston Common Asset Management

Geeta Aiyer is an Indian entrepreneur, business leader, and social activist, best known as founder and president of Boston Common Asset Management, a sustainable investment firm.

== Early life and education ==
Aiyer was born in Chennai, India in 1958.

Aiyer moved to America in 1983 to attend Harvard Business School. She was the second Indian woman to attend to attend the school and graduated with an MBA in finance in 1985. Aiyer also has a BA with honors as well as an MA degree from Delhi University, India.

== Career ==
After graduating from Harvard, Aiyer started with Cambridge Associates as a consultant. She also founded the company East India Spice, her first entrepreneurial venture.

In 1988, Aiyer became an analyst and portfolio manager at the United States Trust Company of Boston. She advised executives of the Albertsons supermarket chain after they had lost a $108 million lawsuit over denying female employees advancement opportunities. Aiyer "demonstrated to Albertsons that unfair employment practices were a financial liability", resulting in the company making a commitment to gender equity moving forward.

In 1994, Aiyer founded Walden Capital Management, using the revenues made from running her first company. Aiyer cites pursuing "dual goals of financial return and social change on behalf her clients" as a driving principal behind establishing a firm focused on responsible investment.

From 1998 to 2002, Aiyer was president of Walden Asset Management.

In 2003, Aiyer founded Boston Common Asset Management as an employee-owned sustainable investment firm. Aiyer has served as its president since 2003, overseeing $5 billion in assets under management. Boston Common is known for practicing ethical investing, making investments in line with environmental, social, and corporate governance (ESG) goals.

Boston Common joined a group of other impact investors to pressure the Washington Redskins to change the name of their football team due to racial concerns over their name, a campaign that ran over the course of 12 years. The team changed its name in 2020 following the murder of George Floyd. Aiyer remarked: "There comes a tipping point when, after a company has been fighting you, they suddenly let go because it becomes obvious to them that it’s not worth continuing the fight."

Aiyer is currently a member of Boston University's Impact Measurement & Allocation Program's advisory board.

== Activism ==
Aiyer founded the nonprofit organization Direct Action for Women Now (DAWN), which advocates for victims of gender based violence in India.

== Awards and honors ==
- In 2010, Aiyer was awarded the Highest Leaf Award by the Women's Venture Fund
- In 2014, India New England named her Woman of the Year
- In 2017, Aiyer was the recipient of the Joan Bavaria Award at the CERES conference
- In 2020, Aiyer was inducted into YW Boston's Academy of Women Achievers, honoring her dedication to "eliminating racism and empowering women"
- In 2021, Aiyer was named to the Boston Business Journal's 2021 Power 50: The Movement Makers for being a "pioneer in impact investing"
- In 2023, Aiyer was included by Time into the first TIME100 Climate list, recognizing the 100 most innovative leaders driving business climate action
