= Art in Sierra Leone =

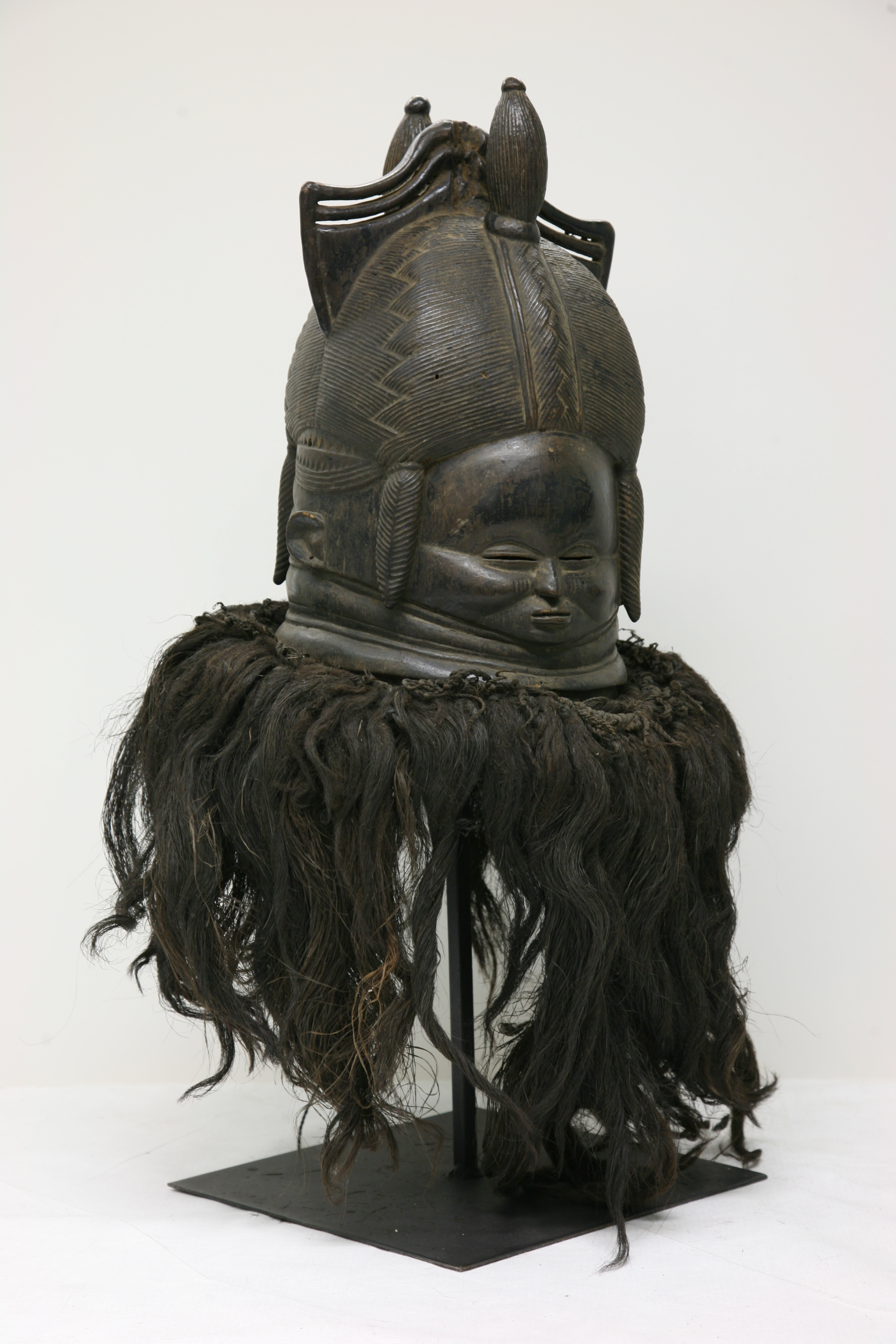
A Sande society helmet mask (1940–1965) in the collection of The Children's Museum of Indianapolis

Art in Sierra Leone has a long and significant tradition of carving and ceremonial works like masks and cloth for initiation and protection. Although art styles are oftentimes ascribed to a single ethnic group (often the Mende), the styles and processes are spread throughout the country and many artists move between the different ethnic groups in the country.

Art is often practiced by organized societies, whether the traditional Sande and Poro societies or the more recent odelay societies of Freetown, and express a range of spiritual and political meanings. Carving using wood, ivory, and stone has been prominent for many centuries and retains importance today. In addition, since the 1930s, Freetown has had a number of lanterns competitions where different groups construct large, decorative floats.

== Artistic societies and groups ==
=== Sande and Poro Societies ===
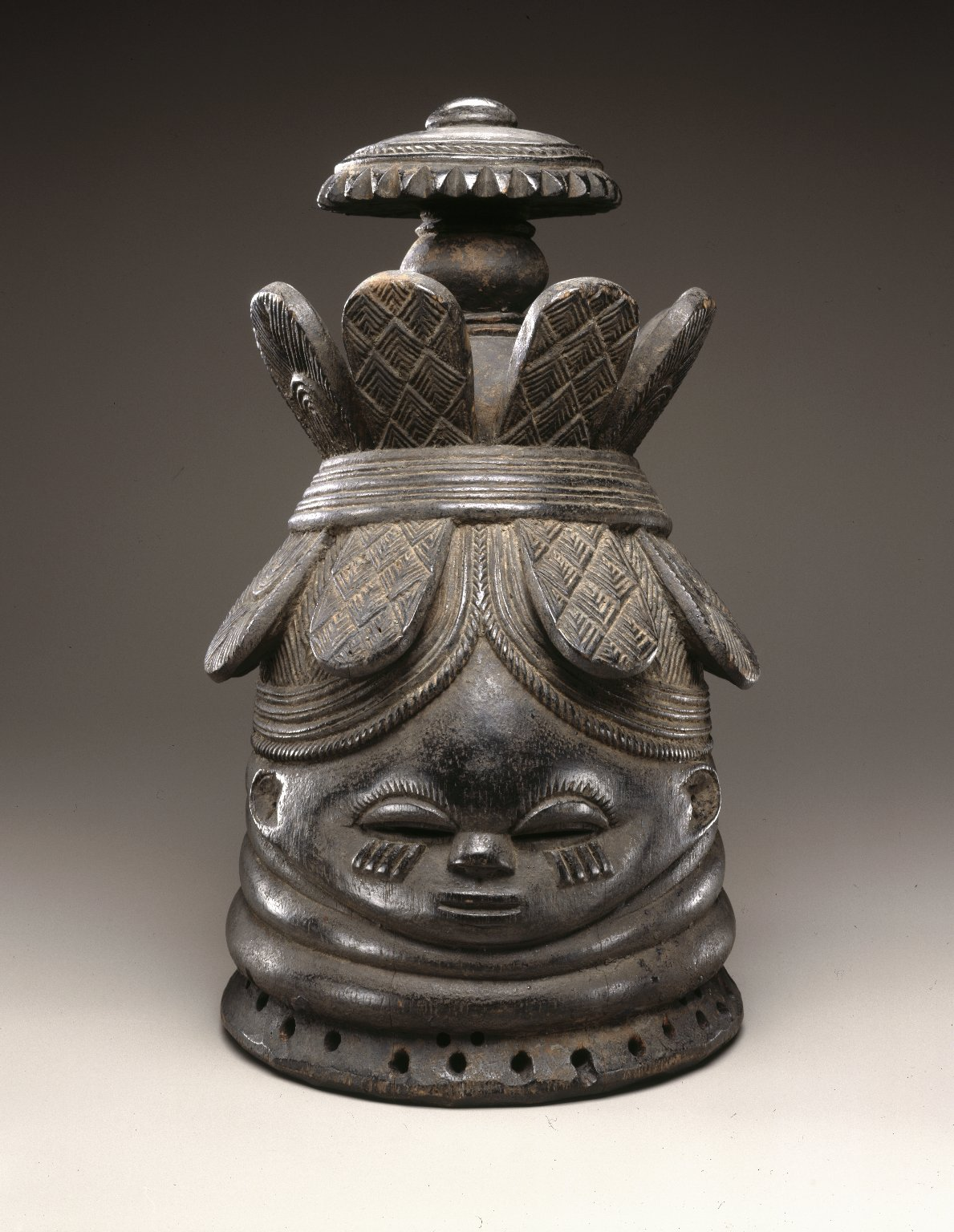
Sande mask. (Brooklyn Museum)

The Sande (female) and Poro (male) ceremonial societies have a long history of artistic construction in many different ethnic groups of Sierra Leone. Although most often affiliated with the Mende, these societies exist widely in the ethnic groups of Sierra Leone including in the Temne, the Kono, the Vai, and Bullom languages communities.

The Sande and Poro societies, which are primarily tasked with the initiation ceremonies for women and men to become a part of the community, produce an important range of artwork associated with the ceremony. One of the most prominent artistic forms associated with these societies are the helmet masks (called sowei in Mende and anawu in Temne) involved in the initiation rituals.

=== Odelay societies ===
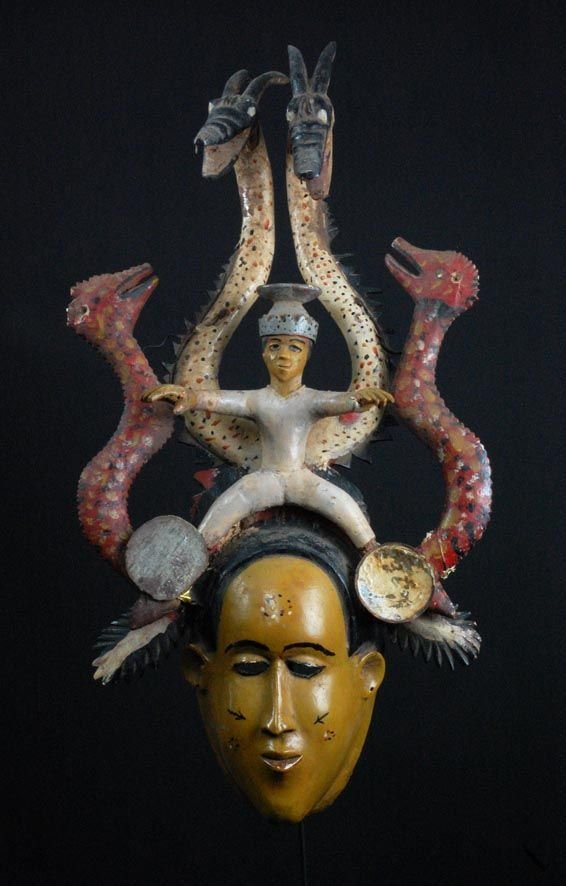
Odelay mask by Temne people. Brooklyn Museum.

Sierra Leone did not develop a significant artistic tradition of patriotic imagery during the struggle for independence and after. However, after the 1992 Sierra Leonean coup d'état, youth groups (odelay societies) formed and began engaging in high-profile art with patriotic themes. Prominent figures depicted were Bai Bureh or Sengbe Pieh in the lanterns and masks by the odelay societies in Freetown. In addition to historical heroes, the art often depicts National Provisional Ruling Council (NPRC) leaders and symbols (such as Valentine Strasser and Solomon Musa).

== Woodworking ==
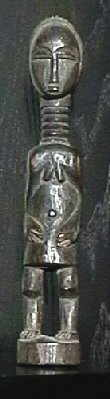
Wood figure of the Mende people

In general, there are clear regional differences in the wood carving techniques of the forest communities (the Mende, Vai, and Bullom) with smooth edges and intricate details. The savannah style (the Temne Limba, and Loko communities), in contrast, is defined by abstract styles with straight lines and bold contrasts.

Twin figures are prominent in Temne cultural practice and the wood carvings play a key role in the ceremonial life of the community. These figures of no more than a foot tall are created when a twin child passes away, and are used initially as a play partner for the living twin and as a ceremonial site for the mother.

The twin figures are carved into a number of other ceremonial related wood, including staffs for religious initiation and healing. Associated with these figures is the construction of small-scale houses for the twin (called ka-bangka in Temne) which are spread throughout the area. This use of twin figures is associated with wider spiritual powers that twins are claimed to possess in Temne beliefs.

== Stone and ivory carving ==
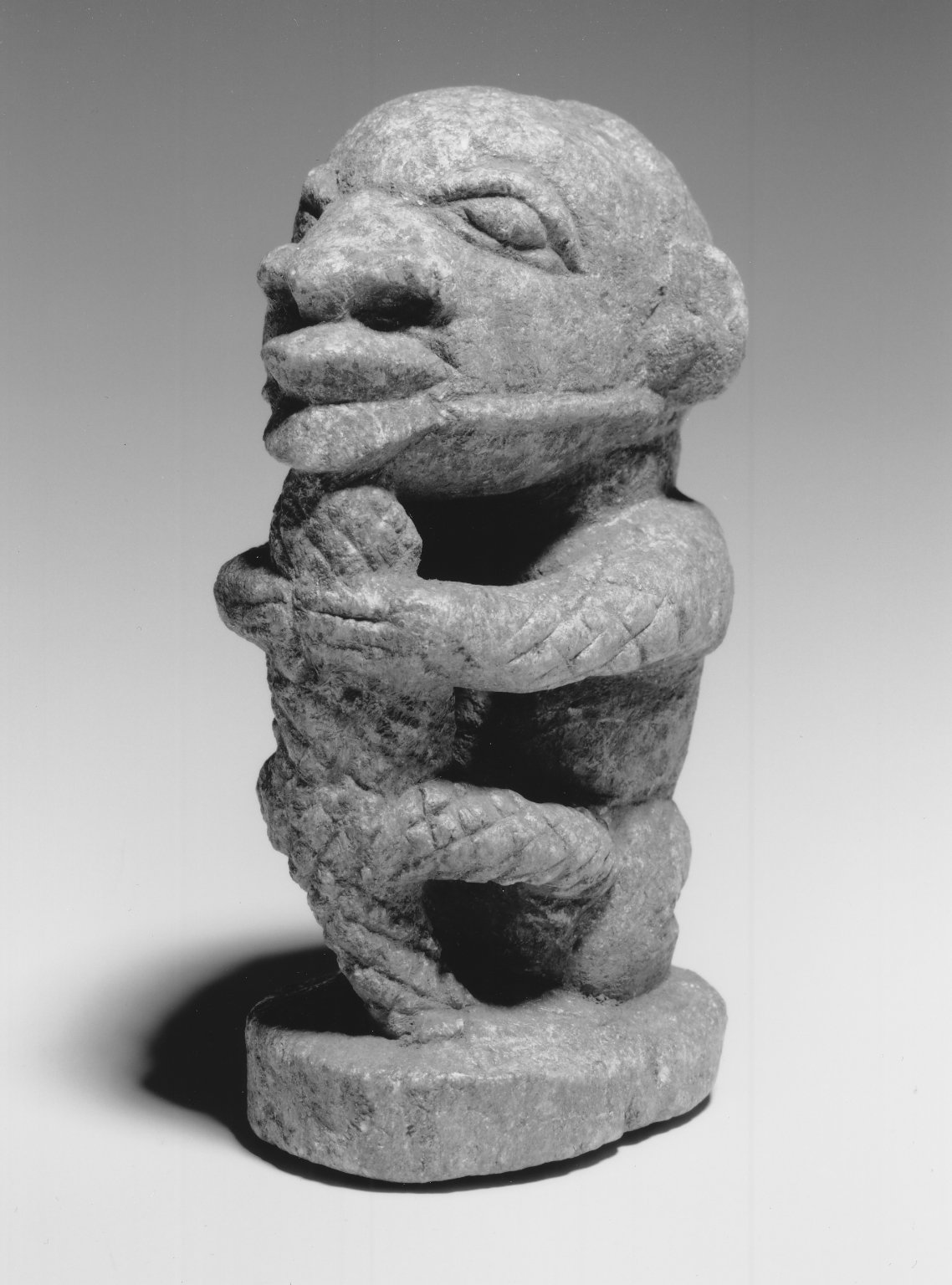
Nomoli stone carving of a man holding a crocodile. (Brooklyn Museum)

Ivory carvings have been produced by many of the ethnic groups in the current area of Sierra Leone and were a primary export to Portuguese traders when they first began the trade networks with the coastal communities. It was not until the 1950s that the stylistic connections between the ivory pieces and the large stone carvings which were discussed significantly by European sources earlier in that century.

The nomoli or pomdo stone carvings of unclear origin have been discovered buried around southern Sierra Leone. The figures were first described by Europeans in 1852 by missionary George Thompson who discovered a group of five of them on the site of a destroyed village. The human figures, carved out of soapstone, are found throughout a large area that was controlled primarily by the Temne until the Mende entered in the 1600s. When asked about the statues by early explorers, the people in the region expressed the belief that they were the work of spiritual beings and that no one in the communities knew how to make such a figure.

The Mende believe the stones are the representations of the people who lived in the region before they came to the area and the Temne people have a ceremony around the stones where they treat them as former chiefs and kings of the region. African art curator Frederick Lamp believes that the stone carvings are a Temne tradition which was lost when the Mende invaded and displaced the communities which had existed there before that.

== Cloth work ==
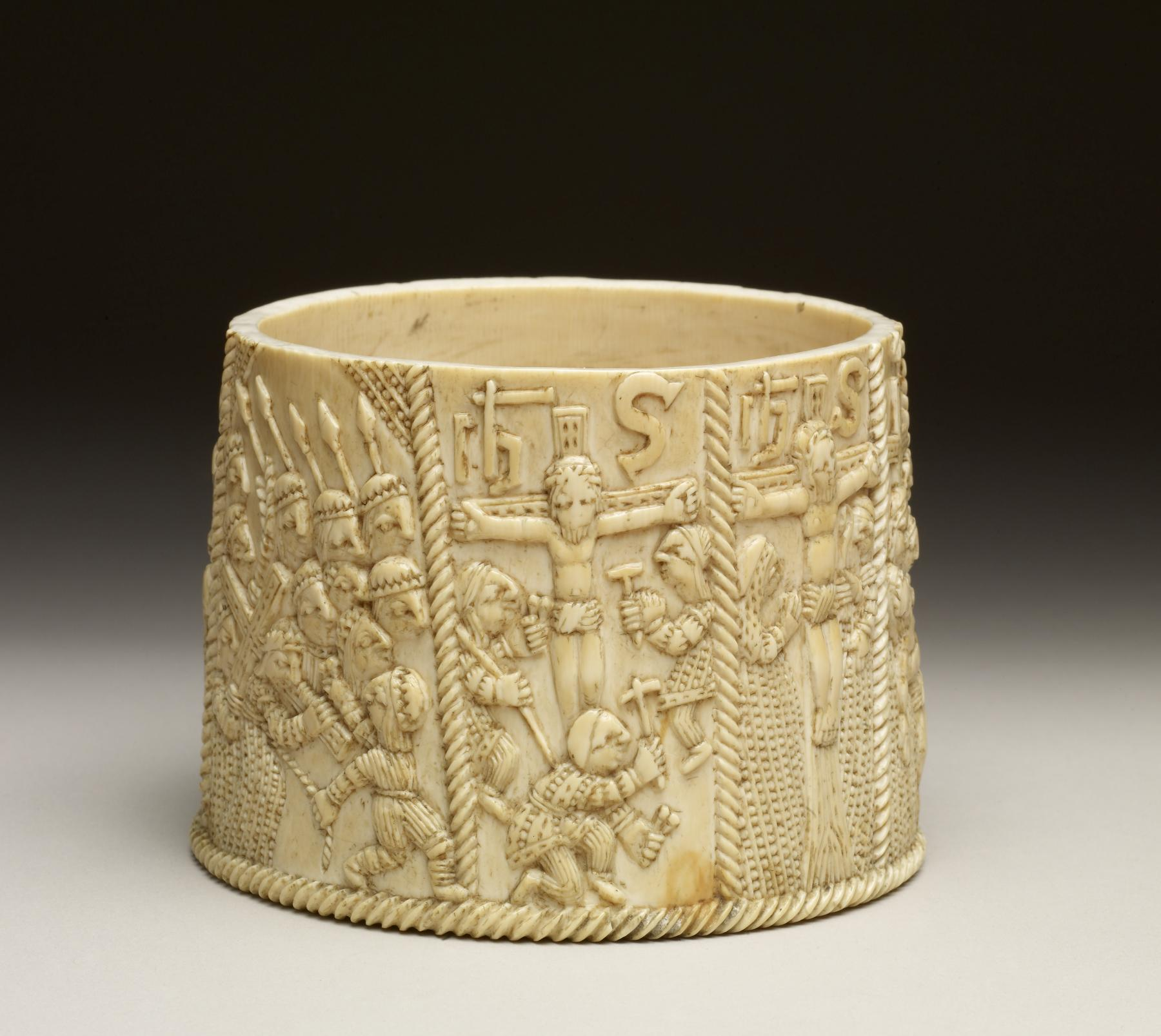
Ivory carving of approximate 1500s origin from Sierra Leone

Cloth arts are often used in many of the different groups in Sierra Leone to provide special types of protection. The cloth is provided with specific designs for spiritual protection for the wearer.

== Lanterns ==
A prominent modern artistic expression involves the design and floating of lanterns down the river in Freetown, the capital of the country. From 1961 until 1991, the Young Men's Muslim Association (YMMA) held competitions where various different civil groups would design large floats, often with lights inside or outside, in celebration of Ramadan. The lanterns are constructed out of wood, bamboo, wire, paper, rice and other materials and represent landmarks, animals, or supernatural beings.

The lantern festival began small in the 1930s when the businessman Daddy Maggay witnessed a Catholic lantern festival in the Gambia. The small processions slowly grew, largely as a result of the reputation for good cooking by Maggay's wife (whose specialty was corn and couscous), and eventually became run by the YMMA.

As the competition grew, violence occasionally broke out and the event grew larger and larger. The events and lanterns often have political themes related to the issues in Sierra Leone at the time and are affiliated with various movements. The regular holding of the lantern competition was ended in 1991 by the civil war, but irregular competitions still are held.

== Prominent artists ==
- Alphonso Lisk-Carew: Early 20th-century photographer in Freetown.
- Alusine Bangura: 1990s Freetown muralist.
- Kwame Haleston
- Esther Maxwell-Orumbie
- Loiuse Metzger
- Tarawali Tarazadio
- Cam Coker
- Mudiama Kammoh
- Samuel S. Marco
- Hawa-Jane Bangura
- Olayinka Miranda Burney-Nicol
