= José Dias Coelho =

Portuguese artist (1923–1961)

José Dias Coelho (1923 in Pinhel – 1961 in Lisbon) was a Portuguese painter and sculptor, an anti-fascist and an important member of the Portuguese Communist Party.

In his youth, José Dias Coelho joined the Antifascist Academic Front. Later on, as a student of the Art Academy of Lisbon, he was a member of the Juvenile MUD. In 1947 he participated in a great number of student demonstrations and actively pressed for the creation of an Academic Association in the Art Academy and against the 1952 NATO meeting in Lisbon. As a consequence of this action, he was expelled from the Art Academy, prohibited to enroll in any other faculty of the country and dismissed from his teaching position in the technical section of the educational system. He joined the Portuguese Communist Party in his early twenties and soon became an important member of the party's clandestine network that struggled against the Fascists.

He died as a secret worker of the party when he was assassinated by PIDE, the political police of the Estado Novo regime, on 19 December 1961 on da Creche street in Lisbon, (now José Dias Coelho street).

In 1972, Zeca Afonso released a song titled A Morte Saiu à Rua (Death is out on the Streets), a homage to Dias Coelho.
