= Juan Manuel Delgado =

Juan Manuel Delgado may refer to:

- Juanma (footballer born 1977) (Juan Manuel Delgado Moreno), Spanish retired footballer
- Juan Manuel Delgado Lloria (born 1990), commonly known as Juanma, Spanish footballer
- Juan Manuel Delgado y Hernández de Tejada (1896–1974), commonly known as Juan Delgado, Spanish fencer

== See also ==
- Juan Delgado (disambiguation)
