= Shirley Miranda-Rodriguez =

American photographer

Shirley Rodriguez (also credited as Shirley Miranda-Rodriguez) is a New York-based editorial and commercial still and motion photographer and media producer. She has shot commercially for notable brands including Olay, Fruit of the Loom, CoverGirl, Girl Scouts of the USA, Simon & Schuster (book covers), Pantene, Isaac Mizrahi, and the New York International Latino Film Festival, for whom she collaborated as the director of photography in the 2008 campaign that won the PromaxBDA Bronze Award. Her work has appeared in Latina, Crain, Siempre Mujer, Hispanic, Urban Latino, The New York Times Online and Vibe magazines among other notable publications. She is currently the creative director and president at Create The Remarkable, Inc., a video production and photography company she co-founded with her partner, Julian Gerena-Quinones, in 2013.

Rodriguez has worked on marketing campaigns for educational institutions, non-profit organizations, and magazines for over a decade. She is a contributor to Mamiverse.com and was one of the four women selected to speak to the first Lady Michelle Obama in July 2012 in a historical round table discussion. Rodriguez spoke about health care and autism spectrum disorders.

Rodriguez's personal work is primarily in portraiture. Her most recent personal work highlights artists in New York of varying genres ranging from performance artists to comic book illustrators. Among her many photo collections, her most popular collection is that of fine art nudes & portraits of over 150 women, LatiNatural, which has garnered her international press and solo shows throughout New York City. This internationally recognized work explores the body image, diversity, and experience of the North American Latina woman. LatiNatural has been exhibited throughout New York City including solo shows at the Bolivar Arellano Gallery in the East Village and the Caribbean Cultural Center African Diaspora Institute.

In 2005, El Diario/La Prensa honored Rodriguez with their "Mujeres Destacadas" (Distinguished Women) award. She is a graduate of New School University. In 2003 she co-founded Somos Arte, LLC, a creative service firm where she served as creative director and senior photographer until 2011.

== Early life and education ==
Rodriguez was born in New York City to Puerto Rican parents. She was raised in Brooklyn, New York where she attended a specialized middle school for gifted children immediately being directed to concentrate her studies on fine art. Rodriguez attended the prestigious Brooklyn Technical High School, a specialized public school catering to engineering and science education. Beginning in high school, she became a community organizer, volunteering for many years with a variety of organizations on issues ranging from youth leadership, language rights, anti-police brutality, women's rights as well as education and health policy for the disenfranchised. She attended Fordham University and received her bachelor's degree at the New School University in New York. She continued honing her studies at the International Center for Photography.

Shirley has served as a media arts educator and consultant with various renowned arts organizations including The Tribeca Film Institute, The Film Society at Lincoln Center, the Educational Video Center and The Brooklyn Children's Museum.

== LatiNatural ==
The LatiNatural collection by Rodriguez examines the North American Latina, presenting images of 150 women photographed in an unchanging background, wearing no makeup, either draped in a white sheet or in the nude.

The collection can be seen as revolutionary in its exploration of body image, beauty and diversity among this population while showing women of various skin tones, body types, hair textures, ages and professional backgrounds. Among women photographed are published authors, doctors, lawyers, artists, film-makers, dancers, students, mothers, sisters, grandmothers and maids. The women shared testimonies with the photographer prior to each shoot. Their stories include incest survivors, single mothers, girls dealing with the death of a parent, mothers experiencing the loss of a child, widows, pregnant women, life partners, cancer survivors, women coping with issues of body image, domestic violence survivors, spiritual leaders and women who are the first in their families to graduate from college.

== Past exhibitions ==
- "Brooklyn Borough President's Hispanic Heritage Month Celebration", Brooklyn City Hall: October 2013
- "The New York Times, Hispanic Heritage Month Celebration" - New York, NY: October 2012
- The Latina Lounge, presented by Latina Magazine & Volvo - New York, New York: October 2006
- New York International Latino Film Festival, Vanguard Series - New York, New York: July 2005
- Local Project, Shades of Femininity (Group Show) Long Island City, New York: April 30, 2005
- "Brooklyn Borough President's Hispanic Heritage Month Celebration", Brooklyn City Hall: October 2005
- The Lit Lounge, Latina Signature Event - New York, New York: October 27, 2004
- The Bolivar Arellano Gallery - New York, New York: April 22 - May 23, 2004
- Ene - New York, New York: March 19, 2002 Preview Exhibition

== Honors and awards ==
- Latinas Destacadas (Distinguished Latinas Awards), El Diario/La Prensa March 2005
- Women's Venture Fund, "Growing Neighborhood Business" September, 2002
- Citation, President of the Borough of the Bronx, March 8, 1998
- NPRC Lifetime Achievement/Future Lifetime Category, Washington, DC 1997
