= Esteban Novaro =

Venezuelan actor

- Born: Esteban Novaro; 3 June 1998 (age 27); Maracaibo, Venezuela
- Occupations: Musician; Television presenter; actor
- Years active: 2005–present
- Television: Carolay
- Website: estebannovaro.com

Esteban Novaro (born June 3, 1998, in Maracaibo, Venezuela) is an actor and television presenter, known for his work as the protagonist of the Carolay series, broadcast internationally by Ve Plus and Venevisión. In 2021, he received the Mara International Award for Actor of the Year.

== Biography ==
Esteban was born in the city of Maracaibo, the son of Raiza Morales and Jeyzer Novaro. He graduated from the Dr. Rafael Belloso Chacín University with a degree in Social Communication with an Audiovisual mention, graduating with honors in 2019. He is currently continuing his career and artistic training in the city of Miami.

== Artistic career ==
From an early age, Esteban has been related to the artistic environment. At just 7 years old, he worked as a children's presenter on the channel Once del Zulia, Children Singers Television (NCTV), in the programs "Pequeños Genios" (Little Geniuses (2004-05)) and Sorpresas Infantiles (2005-06). In 2007, he joined the Modesta Bor Children's Choir of the Fátima Cantábile Foundation of the Nuestra Señora de Fátima School in Maracaibo and where until 2015, he was part of the different groups within the foundation such as the Antonio Lauro Instrumental Group where He played the guitar and the Inocente Carreño Youth Choir, appearing at various concerts and festivals in Maracaibo and Venezuela, such as the International D'Canto Festival on several occasions.

In 2013, she made her first leap into acting for the musical Anita la Huerfanita del Sol by the Titilar Teatro company, which premiered the same year, and thus continued her career in theater with participation in the works 1970 El Musical (2013) and A Christmas Story (2013-14) with Titilar Teatro and later in Como con Ganas de Morir (2015) and Marionetas (2017) with the Actoral Tea group.

At the end of 2017, he participated in a casting searching for the talents to star in a new television series, where he was selected to play Anthony, the protagonist of the youth television series Carolay, which was broadcast nationally through Venevisión de 2019 to 2020 and by Ve Plus internationally in 2021. His performance in Carolay earned him the Mara International Award for Best Actor of the Year.

== Trajectory ==
=== Television ===
- Carolay (Anthony) / Venevision and Ve Plus / 2019-2020
- Pequeños Genios (Little Geniuses (Main Presenter)) / Canal 11 del Zulia (NCTV) 2004-2006

=== Theater ===
- Anita La Huerfanita del Sol / Titilar Theater / Radio Announcer (Antagonist) / Season 2013
- A Christmas Story / Title Theater (Secondary Characters) Season 2013
- Like Wanting to Die / Actoral TEA (Protagonist) Season 2015
- Puppets Actoral TEA (Protagonist) / Seasons 2016 and 2017

== Awards and honours ==
- International Mara 2021: Actor of the Year
