= Carolay =

Venezuelan youth television series

- Genre: Telenovela; Musical; Romantic comedy
- Created by: Oduver Cubillan
- Starring: Caterine Baker; Esteban Novaro; Samer Kotteich; María Manuela Corzo; Enzo Pradelli
- Opening theme: "Carolay Va Comenzar" by Caterine Baker and Carlos J Vilchez
- Country of origin: Venezuela
- Original language: Spanish
- No. of episodes: 24

Production
- Production locations: Zulia, Venezuela
- Running time: 45 minutes

Original release
- Network: Ve Plus TV (Latin America); Venevisión (Venezuela)
- Release: October 26, 2019 – January 12, 2020

Carolay is an independent nationally produced youth television series starring Carolay Santos in Maracaibo, Venezuela, in production with Oduver Cubillan and co-produced by BGCreativos. It premiered between October 26, 2019 and January 12, 2020 on Venevisión. A second season was confirmed. Carolay's producer stated that his dream was to have a series broadcast by Venevisión.

It is the first Venezuelan youth series to be produced and recorded exclusively in the state of Zulia.

== Synopsis ==
Carolay is not an ordinary girl as everyone may believe, she is the daughter of prosapia (human) parents, but one day she will discover a great truth and understand why she is different from prosapia society. She discovers that she is the daughter of a magical king, called Mr. Very Good, an inhabitant of the sweet planet and for this reason she is heir to the royal throne. But this is not as easy as you imagine, Carolay is doomed to die at the hands of the Bitter Witch.

== Cast of actors ==
- Dora Mazzone
- Simón Pestana
- Antonio Delli
- Hilda Abrahamz
- Tania Sarabia
- Diana Patricia Cubillan
- Ángel Atencio
- Caterine Baker
- Samer Kotteich
- Esteban Novaro
- María Manuela Corzo
- Enzo Pradelli
- Surena
- Alejandra Flores
- Leonel Soto
- Gabriel Valdivieso
- Sandy Miranda
- Dianela Parra
- Victoria Saracino
- Megan Al Abdala
- Nerio Cuadrado
- Alfredo Suárez
- Bárbara Serpente
- Fabiana Rutigliano
- Giovanna Picazza
- Rey Raggio
- Iceberg Méndez
- Valeria Fernández
- Vanessa Cassiani
- Paula Moreno
- Kariana
- Norayda Reyes
- Arianni Villalobos
- Douglas Castro
- Katherin Vielma
