= Juan Delgado =

Juan Delgado may refer to:

- Juan Antonio Delgado (born 1971), Spanish politician
- Juan Delgado (baroque painter) (c. 1675–1731), Spanish Baroque painter
- Juan Delgado (Chilean footballer) (born 1993)
- Juan Delgado (fencer) (1896–1974), Spanish fencer
- Juan Delgado (footballer, born 1992), Honduran football midfielder
- Juan Delgado González (1868–1898), colonel in the Cuban War of Independence
- Juan Delgado (Spanish footballer) (born 1994)
- Juan Delgado (Uruguayan footballer) (born 1891)

== See also ==
- Juanma (footballer born 1977), Spanish retired footballer born Juan Manuel Delgado Moreno
- Juanma (footballer, born 1990), Spanish footballer born Juan Manuel Delgado Lloria
