= Boris Miranda =

Bolivian journalist (1984–2021)

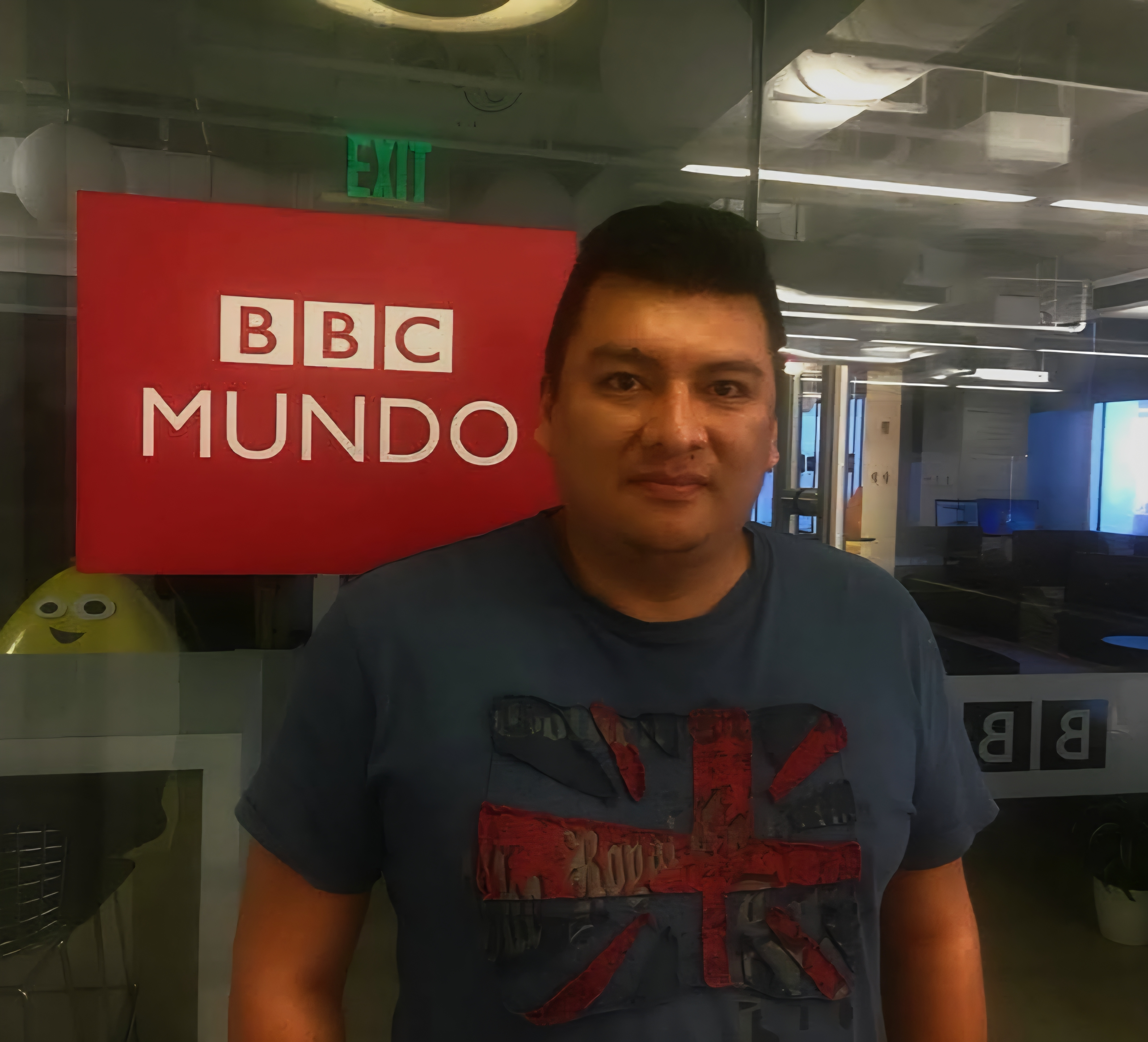
- Born: 21 January 1984; La Paz, La Paz Department, Bolivia
- Died: 16 May 2021 (aged 37); Miami, Florida, United States
- Education: Colegio San Calixto; Higher University of San Andrés
- Occupations: Journalist, researcher
- Awards: See below

Boris Iván Miranda Espinoza (21 January 1984 – 16 May 2021) was a Bolivian journalist and researcher. Known for his investigative journalism work on social conflict in Bolivia, he specialized in the coverage of public policies on drugs, investigation, chronicles and security being considered one of the most prominent references in Bolivian journalism of the 21st century.

He began his career in the media in his home country, as well as at the BBC via BBC Mundo; he was a trainer at the Deutsche Welle Akademie. He was a pioneer in digital journalism in Bolivia, becoming an instructor in different spaces.

== Biography ==
=== Early years ===
Miranda was born in the city of La Paz, he was one of the three children of Jenny Espinoza and Iván Miranda Balcázar, an outstanding journalist and university professor. He studied at the Colegio San Calixto, then later pursued a career in Political Sciences at the Higher University of San Andrés in La Paz.

=== Journalistic career ===
Miranda was an active member of the first digital communities in Bolivia, co-producing one of the first podcasts in the country in 2007, publishing blogs and being an active user of social networks as a playful, social space and journalistic tool.

Miranda began his journalistic career in 2008 in the newspaper La Prensa, later becoming part of the group of founders of the newspaper Página Siete, where he worked between 2010 and 2013. He was a member of the editorial board of the magazine El Desacuerdo, and in 2015 he joined the BBC newsroom developing work as a multimedia producer, becoming the Bolivian correspondent in Colombia in 2017.

As part of his journalistic work at the BBC, Miranda published articles on events such as the conflict associated in Bolivia with the project of a highway through the Isiboro Sécure National Park and Indigenous Territory, or the resignation of Evo Morales and the associated crisis.

=== Death ===
Miranda died in Miami, Florida on 16 May 2021 at the age of 37. The journalistic community in his country lamented his death. Authorities such as the president of Bolivia, Luis Arce, mayor of La Paz, Iván Arias, entities such as the Vice Ministry of Communication and the Ministry of Government publicly expressed their tributes. In the same way, in social network communities such as Twitter and Facebook, of which he was a user, his friends and colleagues expressed their condolences despite highlighting the human and professional quality of the journalist.

== Bibliography ==
Among his written work are articles of journalistic investigation, and a chronicle, Miranda published the following books:

- La mañana después de la guerra, 2012.
- La última tarde del adiós, 2013. Based on the fall of Gonzalo Sánchez de Lozada and the Black October massacre.

He participated as a collaborator in the following book:

- 30 años de democracia en Bolivia : repaso multidisciplinario a un proceso apasionante (1982 - 2012).

== Awards and honors ==
Among the distinctions that were awarded were:

- National Journalism Award on Municipalities, 2010
- Advanced Investigative Journalism Scholarship, 2011.
- Distinction for Journalistic Merit from the Konrad Adenauer Foundation and the Association of Journalists of La Paz, 2011.
- National Prize for Digital Journalism, 2012
- Bolivia DataBootCamp with the project ¿Adónde las llevan?, 2013
- Victory Medal for Excellence in Political Journalism, 2015
