= Carpo =

Carpo may refer to:

- Carpo, one of the Horae in Greek mythology
- Carpo (moon), an irregular satellite of Jupiter
- Carpo (surname), a list of people with the name
