= José Edmar Brito Miranda =

Brazilian lawyer and politician (1934–2021)

Member of the Legislative Assembly of Goiás
- In office 1983–1991
- In office 1963–1971

Personal details
- Born: 3 January 1934 Pedro Afonso, Republic of the United States of Brazil
- Died: 25 December 2021 (aged 87) São Paulo, Brazil
- Party: PSD; MDB

José Edmar Brito Miranda (3 January 1934 – 25 December 2021) was a Brazilian politician. A member of the Brazilian Democratic Movement, he served in the Legislative Assembly of Goiás from 1963 to 1971 and again from 1983 to 1991.
