= Anabella Queen =

Venezuelan child singer (born 2012)

- Born: Anabella Suhaila Nammour Vargas; February 1, 2012 (age 13); Zulia, Venezuela
- Genres: Pop; Latin music
- Occupation: Child singer
- Works: Creation Music Group
- Website: anabellaqueen.com

Anabella Suhaila Nammour Vargas (born February 1, 2012), known professionally as Anabella Queen, is a Venezuelan child singer. She rose to fame in 2018 with her first song "Tu chiquilla", directed by Alex Galán. She is known for other songs such as "Como Niños" and "No tengas miedo". She has collaborated with other artists including Fefi Oliveira and Reggi El Auténtico.

== Biography and career ==
Anabella Queen was born on February 1, 2012, in the state of Zulia, Venezuela, although she lives in Miami, Florida.Her father is Danilo Nammour, a Venezuelan racing driver and owner of the footwear company Zapatos Grande. Her mother, Belkys Vargas, is often the executive producer of her music videos and also chooses her wardrobe.

=== Early years ===
From an early age, Anabella Queen developed her artistic skills by taking dance and singing classes.

=== Beginnings in the Music World ===
Anabella began her career in music by recording covers of songs by Corina Smith and Gaby Nova. She also collaborated with the group DJT on the song "Quiero darte mi corazón."

=== Musical Career ===
Her first song, "Tu chiquilla," was released in 2018 under the direction of Alex Galán and featuring Julián Gil. At the end of that same year, she released her second single, "Bailando a lo loco."

Later, in 2019, she collaborated with Juanse Laverde, winner of the third season of La Voz Kids Colombia, on the song "Como niños" after being invited to the show's recordings. This song quickly became a hit on stage and television, and Queen and Laverde were fortunate enough to open for the Tour Yatra concerts, a musical tour of Colombia for singer Sebastián Yatra.

On the eve of her 8th birthday in 2020, she released "No tengas miedo," the most successful song of her entire musical career. Three months later, in May, she collaborated with Venezuelan actress Fefi Oliveira on the song "Como seria." In June, she released "Iguales" with the social media-famous Venezuelan sculptor Josué Benjamín. In September, she began publishing a 13-episode animated series on her YouTube channel titled "Anabella Queen - the Series," accompanied by the song "Hula Hula."

In early 2021, she released the song "Sigue tu corazón," recorded in Maracaibo. A month later, she gained popularity when her father closed Venezuela's longest bridge, the General Rafael Urdaneta Bridge, to allow her to give a virtual concert. She later released the songs "Destino," "Mamá," and "Al revés." She also dedicated a song to her nephew Thiago.

In February 2022, she began publishing the 10 songs that would make up her first album, "Pequeña Gigante," completed in November of that same year. She also began touring Venezuela and Mexico to promote her album.

After the success of "Pequeña Gigante," she began releasing the songs that would make up her second album, "11th," in 2023.

== Discography ==
=== 2018 ===
- "Tu chiquilla"
- "Bailando a lo loco"

=== 2019 ===
- "Como niños"

=== 2020 ===
- "No tengas miedo"
- "Iguales"
- "Como sería"
- "Hula Hula"

=== 2021 ===
- "Sigue tu corazón"
- "Destino"
- "Mamá"
- "Al revés"

=== 2022 ===
- "Shalala"
- "Cuando sea grande"
- "Enamora2"
- "Afrobella"
- "Pequeña Gigante"
- "Poco a poco"
- "Baila"
- "Don't be afraid"
- "ZigZag"
- "Se pegó"

=== 2023 ===
- "11:11"
- "Bendición"
- "Finde"
- "Vacaciones"
- "Reír y Llorar"
- "Ritmo"
- "Tanta Falta"
- "Tara Ta Tara"
- "Reir y Llorar" (pop version)
- "Vibra"

=== 2024 ===
- "Merci Beaucop"
- 'I See U"
