= South Florida Internet Exchange =

Internet exchange point in the United States

Florida Internet Exchange
- Abbreviation: FL-IX
- Founded: January 2015
- Location: United States, Miami, Boca Raton, Ft. Lauderdale
- Website: fl-ix.net
- Members: 205
- Ports: 253
- Peak: 4Tbps

FL-IX, owned and operated by non-profit organization Community IX Holdings, allows ISPs, content providers and enterprises to exchange IP traffic in the south Florida region. FL-IX is available in Miami, Boca Raton, Ft. Lauderdale (United States). FL-IX was founded by Tyler Coates from Zayo Group, David Temkin from Netflix and Randy Epstein from Host.net (now 365 Data Centers).

== See also ==
- List of Internet exchange points
