= Carmen Miranda (volleyball) =

Spanish volleyball player (born 1975)

Personal information
- Full name: Carmen Miranda
- Nationality: Spanish
- Born: 6 February 1975 (age 51); Madrid, Spain

Carmen Miranda (born 6 February 1975) is a Spanish former volleyball player who competed in the 1992 Summer Olympics.
