= Sandy Miranda =

Venezuelan actor (born 1996)

- Born: Sandy José Miranda Quintero; 3 January 1996 (age 29); Maracaibo, Venezuela
- Occupations: singer; dancer; actor
- Years active: 2013–present
- Television: Carolay
- Awards: 2019: Mara de Oro Internacional as New Actor of the Year
- Website: sandymirandawebsite.com//

Sandy Miranda (Maracaibo, Venezuela, January 3, 1996) is an actor, model and dancer, known for playing "Juan" in the Carolay series broadcast by Venevisión throughout Venezuela and by VePlus internationally. He won the Mara de Oro Internacional in 2019 as New Actor of the Year and the Tacarigua de Oro for his theatrical performances in Miami.

== Artistic career ==
The beginnings of Sandy's artistic career take place in the world of dance, graduating as a dancer and instructor of Latin genres in his hometown. In 2013, he ventured into the world of acting playing roles in children's plays by the production company Peca Eventos (from 2013 to 2015). In 2015 he joined the main cast of "The man in the mirror", a story told through the music of Michael Jackson, produced by Carlos Julio Vílchez (musical and artistic producer) and presented in 2016 in the main hall of the URU. That same year he is part of two more theatrical productions; "My grandfather's tales", a tribute to Oscar D'Empaire and within the framework of the 20th anniversary of the Titilar acting group, directed by William Quiroz; and Let it be, hagamos el amor en español (“Let it be, let's make love in Spanish”), an adaptation of Cross the Universe directed by Marcos Meza Pineda and produced by the acting group Tea.

In the following years, she ventured into the audiovisual world as a model for several advertising campaigns and music videos, including: Wendy's kids, Val Internacional, the music video "Lágrimas no más" by Guaco, "Are you ready" by the British artist YayRaven with Rico Maz, among others.

In 2018, he joined the main cast of Carolay, a television series written and directed by Oduver Cubillan and broadcast by Venevisión for all of Venezuela between 2019 and 2020 and by Ve Plus TV for Latin America, Spain and the United States between 2020 and 2021. In this series, Sandy plays "Juan", a character with whom he was recognized with the international Mara de Oro, as revelation actor of the year, the Estrella de Venezuela award at a national level and with the awards Tocando la Fama and the Tacarigua de Oro in March 2021 in the city of Miami, Florida.

In 2021, he returns to the stage to change the life of "Víctor", a mistreated waiter in the play Mi joya más preciada ("My most precious jewel") written and directed by Oduver Cubillan and presented at the Regency arts walk in the city of Miami, Florida.

== Trajectory ==
=== Television ===
- 2020 La carta ("The letter") as Christian (protagonic)
- 2020 Carolay as Juan
- 2020 This is not Sad Face / Special participation
- 2019 Mundo de reinas ("World of Queens") [Chapter "Lights, Chamber and Action"] / Jury (himself)

=== Theater ===
- 2021 Mi joya más preciada ("My most precious jewel") as Victor
- 2019 Carolay, the musical as Juan
- 2016 Historias de mi abuelo ("My grandfather's stories") as Conejo Comelón
- 2016 The Man in the Mirror as Miguel

== Awards and honours ==
- 2018: Estrella de Venezuela Award - Revelation Actor of the Year
- 2019: International Mara Award - Revelation Actor of the Year
