= María Feliciana de los Ángeles Miranda =

Salvadoran rebel (died 1812)

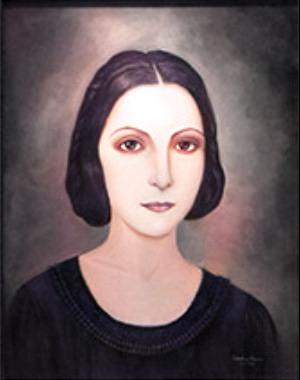
María Feliciana de los Ángeles Miranda

María Feliciana de los Ángeles Miranda (died 1812) was a Salvadoran rebel. A young woman from Colonial El Salvador, she participated in the initial revolt against the Spanish colonial authorities. This effort failed, and Miranda was captured and sentenced to forced labor. She eventually died - either under torture or of disease - but was later recognized by the Salvadorean government as a hero of the independence movement.

== Biography ==
María de los Ángeles Miranda was born in El Salvador in the late 18th century. At the time, El Salvador was part of the Captaincy General of Guatemala, a colonial department of the Spanish Empire. At the time the empire was in a state of turmoil, weakened by an overextended bureaucracy and wars in Europe, while the success of the American Revolution proved that colonial nations could gain independence from their mother countries. When Spain was occupied by French and British armies during the Napoleonic Wars, the Spanish government's ability to maintain control over its colonies was sapped, further strengthening pro independence forces in the Americas. By 1810, tensions between the Spanish colonial authority, their supporters, and pro-independence forces threatened to escalate into an armed struggle; Miranda would eventually become involved in the pro-independence movement.

Prior to 1811, Miranda was a peasant living in the countryside of North-Central El Salvador. On 5 November 1811, a major protest took place against the colonial government in San Salvador. During the protest, the crowd (led by Santiago José Celis and José Matías Delgado) demanded the removal of colonial officials and the complete independence of El Salvador from Spain. However, the movement was only partially successful, as many Salvadoreans still supported the government. Word of the revolt spread to the countryside, and Maria (along with her sister) joined the pro-Independence movement. Along with other rebels, they spread word of the rebellion and took control of the town of Sensuntepeque in December 1811.

Despite their initial successes, the pro-independence rebels were eventually crushed by the colonial authorities. Many - including the Miranda sisters - were arrested and imprisoned by the colonial government. Following her capture, Maria Miranda was imprisoned along with other rebels in the Fortaleza de San Fernando in Honduras, though she would later be transferred to a convent. The Spanish sentenced her public scourging, and she and her sister condemned to forced labor as servants in the household of a pro-Spanish priest. After several months, Spanish authorities returned her to El Salvador so that her sentence could be carried out. In early 1812 Maria Miranda and her sister were led into the central plaza of San Vicente and flogged 100 times each. Maria never recovered, and died shortly afterwards.

Following El Salvador gaining independence, Miranda was honored as an early revolutionary and patriot. In 1976 the Salvadoran Legislative Assembly named her as a "Heroine of the Fatherland", and in 2003 her name was added to a monument in San Salvador.
