= Erma Hoag Miranda =

American singer and composer (1883–1964)

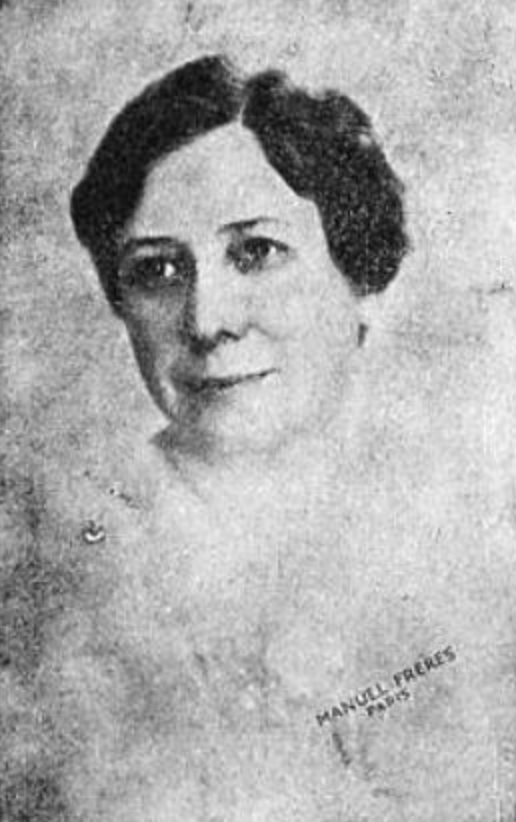
- Erma Hoag Miranda, from a 1929 publication
- Born: Erma Mae Hoag; August 31, 1883; Plainfield, Illinois, U.S.
- Died: December 2, 1964 (age 81); St. Petersburg, Florida, U.S.
- Occupations: Singer, music educator, composer, clubwoman

Erma Mae Hoag Miranda (August 31, 1883 – December 2, 1964) was an American singer, music educator, and composer. She taught at Beloit College, Lincoln College, and Rocky Mountain College. One of her voice students was opera singer Anna Moffo.

== Early life and education ==
Erma Hoag was born in Plainfield, Illinois, the daughter of Harry Clarence Hoag and Margaret Lillian Tait Hoag (later Margaret Hoag French). In 1920 she graduated from Northwestern University's School of Music, where she sang in the a cappella choir under director Peter Lutkin. She also studied piano and composition with Emil Liebling, and voice in Paris, with Marcelle Demougeot and Georges Mauguiere.

== Career ==
Miranda was a lyric soprano who performed as a church soloist and recitalist. She and her husband taught in the music program at Beloit College, where she organized and directed a fifty-voice a cappella choir. They also taught at Lincoln College in Illinois. They directed the music program at the Presbyterian church in Wayne, Pennsylvania, where one of her students was opera singer Anna Moffo. They were co-directors of music at Rocky Mountain College in Montana. Late in her career she taught at the St. Petersburg School of Music in Florida.

Miranda wrote an opera, The Legend of the Trailing Arbutus. She also wrote songs, including "Birds" (1928), a setting of a poem by Richard Henry Stoddard, and songs for Delta Kappa Gamma and Soroptimist International. She was a member of the Composers League of Florida.

== Compositions ==
- "Birds", "I Am the Wind", "The Day Before April", "The Little Shepherd's Song", "Comforting", "A Christmas Lullaby" (1928, songs)
- "Etude Fantasy" and "Song without Words" (1928, compositions for piano)
- "On Barren Hills, the Shepherds" (1938, song, words by Irving Maurer)
- "Oh! The Delta Kappa Gamma Girls of Florida!" (1956, song)
- "Soroptimist International" (1956, song)

== Personal life ==
Hoag married organist Max Garver Miranda in 1917. The Mirandas moved to Florida in 1953. She died in 1964, at the age of 81, in St. Petersburg, Florida.
