= Emanuel Tavares Miranda =

Portuguese sailor (1648–1706)

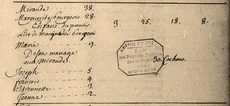
Image of 1687 census record

Emanuel Tavares Miranda (Santa Cruz da Graciosa, December 2, 1648 - 1706, Beaubassin) was a Portuguese sailor and pioneer of Acadia, a colony of the Kingdom of France, composed mostly of individuals with French ancestry. Along with Irish settler Roger Kuessey, he is one of the few non-French Acadians. Notably, he is also one of few Portuguese-Canadians to have resided and settled within the territories known in the present-day as Canada, which include people such as Pedro da Silva and Mathieu da Costa.

== Early life and origins ==
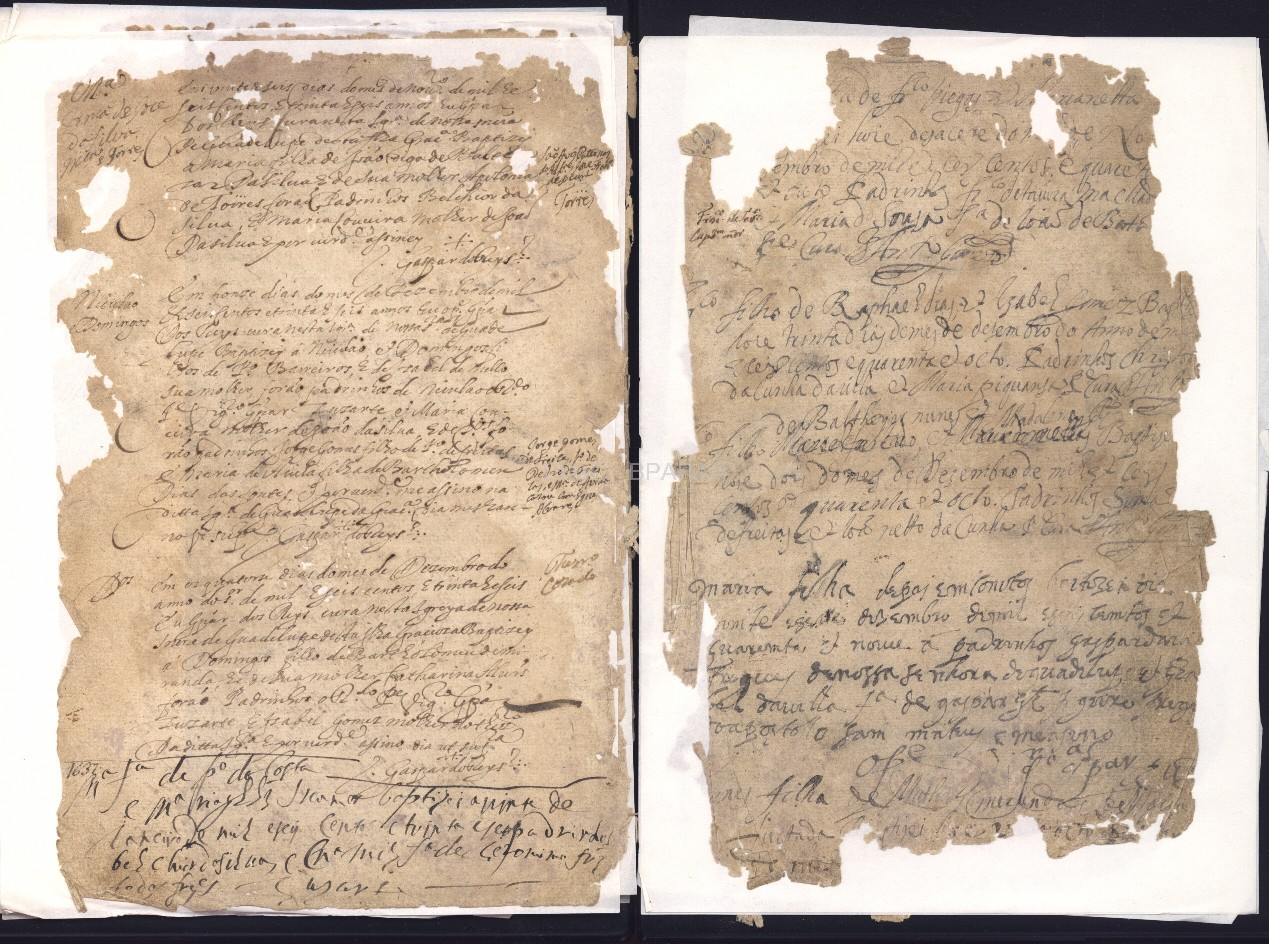
Emanuel Tavares Baptism Record 1648

Emanuel "Manoel" da Costa Tavares da Miranda was born on December 2, 1648, in Santa Cruz da Graciosa, a parish on the island of Graciosa, located in the Azores archipelago which belongs to Portugal. His father, Manoel Tavares Sr. (died November 30, 1679) was from Santa Cruz da Graciosa, as was his mother, Catherine Pires da Covilha (born July 12, 1630). The Tavares family originally came from Miranda do Corvo in Coimbra, mainland Portugal. His parents were of both Portuguese and Spanish descent, his "Medina" great-grandparents having been from Medina de Rioseco in Northern Spain. There is also rumored noble ancestry, with a possibility of descendance from the Bettencourt family, the Spanish and Portuguese nobility, etc. In either his late teens or early twenties, he took up the profession of a seaman, having been born and raised by the sea.

== Emigration to New France ==
In 1670, at the age of 21, Emanuel sailed to Quebec City, presumably for work of some kind. He was contracted for marriage to a local woman named Françoise Duval, but the marriage fell through, with Françoise marrying another man instead, and the contract was ultimately cancelled. The locals described Emanuel as a "Spaniard", despite him being Portuguese. In 1675, now at the age of 25, he was noted to have lived with Catherine Basset who, according to the local authorities, had a "bad reputation" that led to her expulsion from the city. During his time, he too moved from Quebec City, relocating to Beaubassin, a small town located on the isthmus of Chigneto which is situated in between the Canadian provinces of New Brunswick and Nova Scotia, where he would permanently settle. There, on November 30, 1670, nearing the age of 31, Emanuel married a local woman, Marguerite Bourgeois (1658–1732), the daughter of Jacques and Jeanne (née Trahan) Bourgeois. Michel Leneuf de la Vallière, the-then governor and commander of Acadia, was present at their wedding. Emanuel and Marguerite would go on to have nine children together.

It is likely that, after moving to Acadia, Emanuel became a farmer or laborer, which was what the vast majority of Acadians are said to have been. In 1789–1790, he and his wife Marguerite were recorded as having possessed 18 cattle, 8 sheep, and 30 hogs on their landmass amounting to 25 arpents (1,598 yards), as well as three guns. At this point in time, Emanuel and Marguerite were raising five children, four of them—three sons and a daughter—having been from their own marriage, and one of them havfing been a daughter from Marguerite's previous marriage to a by-then deceased man named Jean Boudrot from Port Royal.

== Death and legacy ==
Emanuel died in 1706 at the age of 58. He and his wife Marguerite had nine children. Due to his surviving children having started families of their own and marrying into other established Acadian families (such as the Caissies/Kuesseys, Mignots, and Arseneaus), many Acadians and Cajuns today can trace their ancestry back to Emanuel Tavares Miranda.
