= Nemesio Miranda =

Filipino painter and sculptor (born 1949)

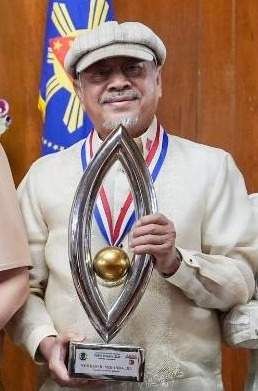
- Miranda with the TOFIL Award trophy
- Born: February 13, 1949 (age 77); Angono, Rizal, Philippines
- Style: Imaginative Figurism

Nemesio “Nemi” R. Miranda Jr. (born 1949), also known as Nemiranda, is a Filipino painter and sculptor in Angono, Rizal. He gained fame as the forerunner the art form “Imaginative Figurism”. He has a degree in Bachelor of Fine Arts from University of Santo Tomas, Manila, Philippines. He is the father of modern artist Keiye Miranda.

== Early life ==
Nemesio Miranda Jr. was born in Angono, Rizal on February 14, 1949. He began drawing at age five and was inspired by Filipino comic books illustration Francisco Coching and later by the Filipino muralist Botong Francisco. At age 15, 1964, he received 1st place in Shankar’s International Competition in Painting on New Delhi, India. As a student, he spent two years painting under the supervision of Miguel Galvez at Mabini where he met pioneers in Mabini art such as Vicente Manansala, Federico Gonzales, and Paco Gorospe. He finished Fine Arts, major in Painting, in University of Santo Tomas in 1970.

== Career ==
Nemiranda launched over 50 solo exhibitions in various parts of the world. He is the founder of the Angono Ateliers Association in 1975, and the promoter of Higantes Festival in Angono. He institutionalized the Nemiranda Family Art Museum, Angono School for the Arts, and the Nemiranda Art Café. He also served as the Chairman of the Angono Tourism Council.

== Nemiranda ArtHouse and Museum ==
The Nemiranda ArtHouse, located in Dona Justa Subdivision Angono, was designed and created by Nemiranda using only local materials such as bamboo, sawali, and old recycled material from old churches and convents in Angono. The arthouse has 4 facets, which are the house gallery, Foyer, Second Floor Galleries, and the Main Gallery. Many of the artworks depicts Angono’s mystic legends and local folklores such as “Ang Nuno”, “Habagat”, “The Mermaid of Angono”, “Amihan”, and “Malakas at Maganda”.

== Notable works ==
- Mural on the “History of the Philippine Army”
- Relief Sculpture in the parade ground of Fort Bonifacio
- People Power I painting
- EDSA Shrine Mural
- EDSA II Relief Sculptures
- Ortigas Park Mural
- The Way of Mary
- 20 Relief Sculpture of the Mysteries of the Holy Rosary from EDSA Shrine to Antipolo Shrine

== See also ==
- Katrina Miranda-Tuazon
