= Renan Miranda =

Brazilian footballer (born 1986)

Personal information
- Full name: Renan Junior Miranda Leite Silva
- Date of birth: January 23, 1986 (age 40)
- Place of birth: Várzea Grande, Brazil
- Height: 1.88 m (6 ft 2 in)
- Position: Midfielder

Youth career
- Juventus-SP
- Figueirense

Senior career*
Years	Team	Apps	(Gls)
2004	Juventus-SP		
2005	Figueirense		
2005–2006	Universidad de Concepción	0	(0)
2006	Fernández Vial	18	(2)
2007	Operário-VG		
2008	Opérario FC		
2009	Operário-VG		
2009–2011	Luverdense	6	(0)
2009	→ Opérario FC (loan)		(0)
2011	Cuiabá	8	(2)
2012	Uberlândia		
2013	Cuiabá	2	(0)
2014–2015	Opérario FC	12	(0)
- * Club domestic league appearances and goals

Renan Junior Miranda Leite Silva (born January 23, 1986) is a Brazilian former professional footballer who played as a right midfielder.

== Teams ==
- (Brazil) Juventus (SP) 2004
- (Brazil) Figueirense 2005
- (Chile) Universidad de Concepción 2005–2006
- (Chile) Fernández Vial 2006
- (Brazil) Operário-VG 2007
- (Brazil) Opérario FC 2008
- (Brazil) Operário-VG 2009
- (Brazil) Luverdense 2009-2011
- (Brazil) Cuiabá 2011
- (Brazil) Uberlândia 2012
- (Brazil) Cuiabá 2013
- (Brazil) Opérario FC 2014-2015

== Post-retirement ==
Renan graduated as a PE teacher.

Renan switched to politics as a member of PSB and MDB. He has served as a Vereador.
