= Juan Delgado (baroque painter) =

Spanish painter (c.1675–1731)

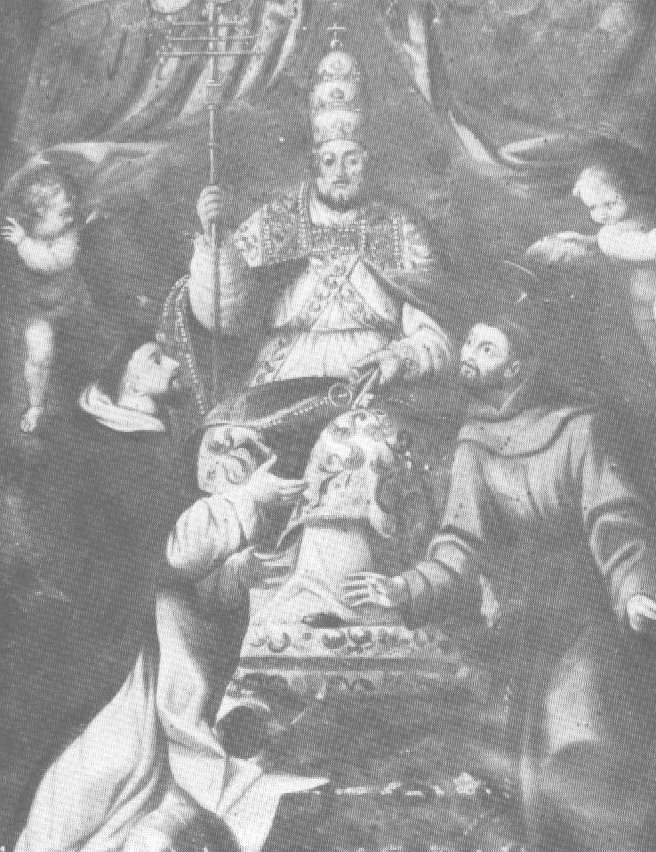
Pope Inocencio III among St. Domingo de Guzmán y St. Francisco de Asís, Atienza, church of La Trinidad.

Juan Delgado (c. 1675–1731) was a Spanish Baroque painter active in Madrid.

== Biography ==
Son of painter Juan Felipe Delgado and Isabel Durán, his marriage to María de Merlo, a native of Getafe, is recorded in 1689. According to Juan Agustín Ceán Bermúdez, he would have been the teacher of Juan García de Miranda (1677–1749).

Already mentioned as a professor of the art of painting in 1696, the first documented works are the four paintings from the collateral altarpieces of San Pedro in the church of the Trinity of Atienza, architecturally carved between 1697 and 1700. Ceán Bermúdez attributed to him the restoration of the paintings by Francisco Herrera the Younger for the choir of the disappeared convent of San Felipe the Real de Madrid. He also cited as his work, signed and dated 1719, a San Francisco Javier with some Indians in the foreground, of good color although of mannered execution, which was found on an altar in the hermitage of the Virgen del Puerto in Madrid. There is also news of his intervention in the creation of sets for the palace's theatrical performances. Thus, in 1722, for the representation of Angélica and Medoro by Antonio de Zamora, a musical drama premiered at the Real Coliseo del Buen Retiro, he painted stagecraft decorations for which he was paid 4,720 reales as "painter of stageworks, decorations and galleys."

He died in Madrid, in the family home on Calle del Reloj on December 1, 1731.
