= Juan García de Miranda =

Spanish painter (1677–1749)

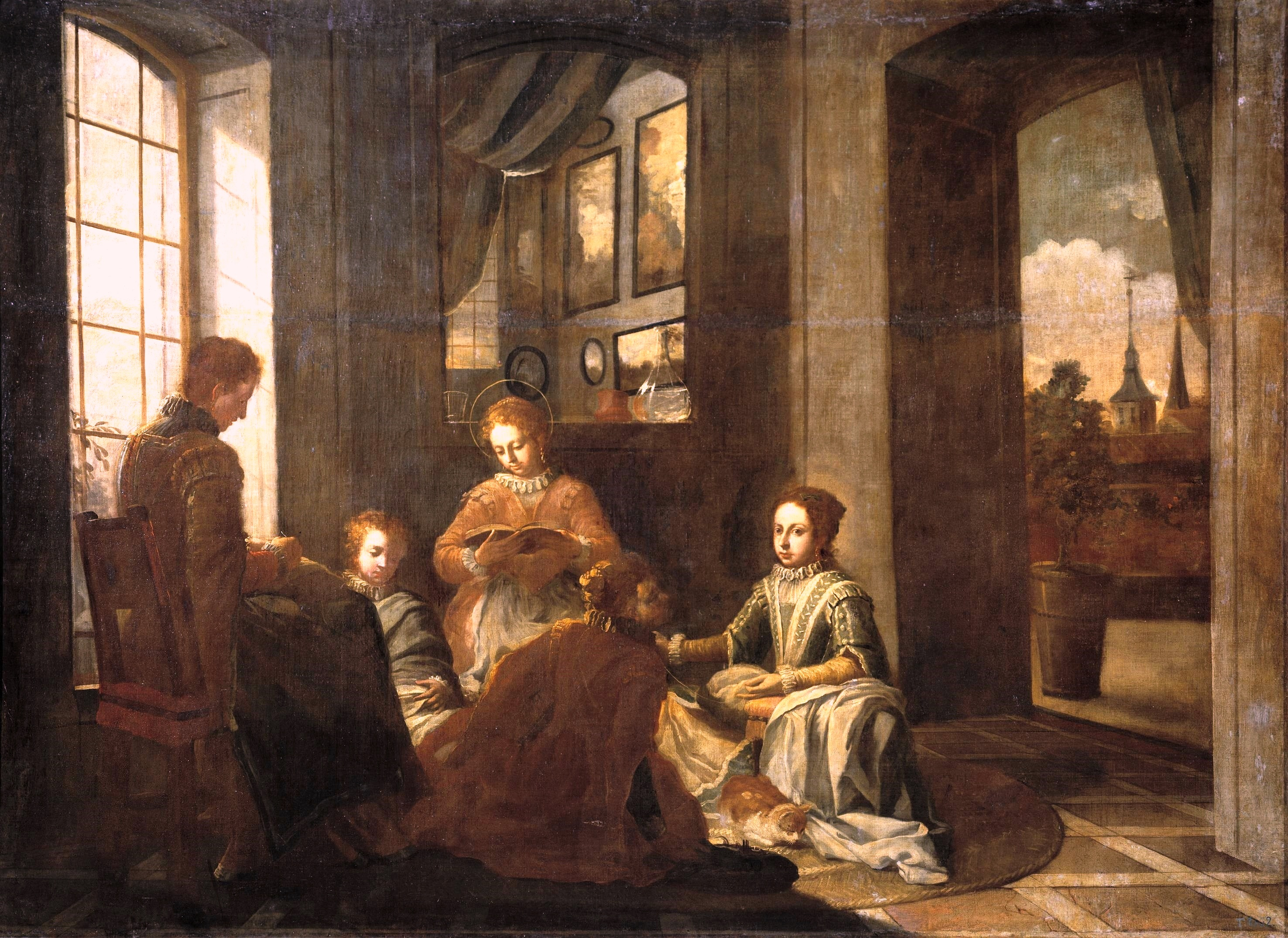
The education of Saint Theresa, 1735, now in the Museo del Prado

Juan García de Miranda (1677–1749), was a Spanish painter of the baroque period, a disciple of Juan Delgado and the uncle of Pedro Rodríguez de Miranda. He was appointed Painter to the King.

Juan García de Miranda was born of Asturian parents at Madrid, and studied painting under Juan Delgado, producing chiefly devotional pictures, particularly Immaculate Conceptions, for private patrons. Born without a right hand, he made use of the stump of the arm to hold pencils, maulstick, &c. He was appointed to clean and restore the pictures injured in the fire at the Alcazar (among them, Las Meninas by Diego Velázquez), and acquitted himself so well as to be appointed, in 1735, painter-in-ordinary to Philip V. He also held, with Palomino, from 1724, the post of public valuer of pictures. He died in 1749, leaving a son Juan, of great promise as a painter, who, however, died at the age of twenty-one. His brother and disciple, Nicolas García de Miranda, who was born in 1698, and died in 1738, painted landscapes with religious figures.
