= Sacuntala de Miranda =

Portuguese historian and political activist (1934–2008)

- Born: 7 November 1934; Ponta Delgada, Azores, Portugal
- Died: 30 January 2008 (aged 73); Cascais, Lisbon, Portugal
- Education: University of Lisbon; University of London; NOVA University Lisbon
- Occupations: Historian; political activist
- Political party: Portuguese Communist Party
- Other political affiliations: Movement of Democratic Unity
- Father: Lúcio de Miranda

Sacuntala de Miranda (7 November 1934 - 30 January 2008) was a Portuguese historian and political activist.

== Early life and education ==
Sacuntala de Miranda was born on 7 November 1934, in Ponta Delgada. She was the daughter of Lúcio de Miranda, a mathematics teacher from Goa, then part of Portuguese India. She spent her early years with her parents in India, before returning to Ponta Delgada in 1942. After graduating from secondary school, she enrolled in the University of Lisbon, where she studied history and philosophy. While at university, she joined anti-fascist and anti-colonial student circles, for which she edited the magazine Eva. She was the leader of the youth section of the Movement of Democratic Unity (MUD) and later joined the Portuguese Communist Party (PCP). For her anti-fascist activism, in December 1953, she was imprisoned by the International and State Defense Police (PIDE). She found refuge from state repression by turning to teaching at the Colégio Moderno. She later supported Humberto Delgado's campaign for the 1958 Portuguese presidential election.

== Career ==
After graduating from university in 1959, she was allowed to teach history, philosophy and politics at a secondary school. After she switched from the approved political theory of the Estado Novo to teaching about democracy and freedom of thought, she was pressured by the PIDE to leave the school. Facing state repression, along with her father who had supported the annexation of Goa by India, she went into exile in England, where she continued agitating against the Estado Novo. From 1964 to 1965, she lived briefly in Algeria, as Algiers was the headquarters of the Portuguese anti-fascist movement at the time. During her time in exile, she worked as a research assistant at the University of London Library and the University of Essex. She was also active in the trade union movement among Portuguese immigrant workers, and in solidarity campaigns with African colonies in the wars of liberation. After Marcelo Caetano came to power, in 1970, she briefly returned to Portugal, where she worked with the Ministry of Public Works to plan the construction of new schools. Unable to bear the lack of freedom of expression in Portugal, she soon returned to England. In 1973, she graduated from the University of London with a degree in sociology and went on to work for the Transport and General Workers' Union (T&G).

Following the Carnation Revolution of 1974, she returned to Portugal, where she worked for the Ministry of Internal Administration in the provisional government of Vasco Gonçalves. After the collapse of the Gonçalves government, she worked in educational research at the Instituto Gulbenkian de Ciência and consulted on education for the Open University.

During the 1980s, she worked as a history professor at the NOVA University Lisbon, where she completed her doctorate; she had finished her studies the history of economic relations between England and Portugal, having worked under Eric Hobsbawm and A. H. de Oliveira Marques. As a historian, she published work on economic, political and migratory history. Her historiographical method draws from Marxist historiography, inspired by the work of Hobsbawm and E. P. Thompson. She has published histories of Portugal and the Azores during the 18th and 19th centuries.

She retired from university lecturing in 1999. In 2003, she published her memoirs about her experiences in the Portuguese anti-fascist movement. In 2006, she published a book of poetry. She also donated her collection, which consisted of 807 books and 101 periodicals, to the municipal library of Ribeira Grande.

== Death and legacy ==
On 30 January 2008, she died in Cascais at the age of 73. Her death came on the 60th anniversary of the Assassination of Mohandas Gandhi, whose philosophy greatly influenced her. On 29 May 2012, a street in Ribeira Grande was named after her.

== Selected work ==
- A Revolução de Setembro de 1836 : geografia eleitoral (1982)
- O ciclo da laranja e os «gentleman farmers» da ilha de S. Miguel, 1780-1880 (1989)
- Portugal. O círculo vicioso da dependência (1890-1939) (1991)
- Quando os sinos tocavam a rebate: notícia dos alevantes de 1869 na Ilha de S. Miguel (1996)
- A emigração portuguesa e o Atlântico 1870-1930 (1999)
- Memórias de um peão nos combates pela liberdade (2003)
- O Sorriso de Satya, with António Eduardo e Mário Miranda (2005)

== Bibliography ==
- Reis Leite, J. G. (30 January 2008). "Miranda, Sacuntala de". In Costa, Ranu (ed.). Enciclopédia Açoriana (in Portuguese).
- "Sacuntala de Miranda (1934-2008)". Ler História (in Portuguese) (54): 201–204. 2008. doi:10.4000/lerhistoria.2425.
- "Sacuntala de Miranda". Memória Comun (in Portuguese). 2019.
