= Hugo Sánchez Bonilla =

Costa Rican artist (born 1940)

Hugo Sánchez Bonilla (born February 1, 1940, in Heredia, Costa Rica) is an artist.

== Career ==
Sánchez taught at the Autonomous University of Central America (UACA). Since 1984 he has continued to teach at his personal art school.

Individual shows

- 1977 La Nación Main Hall
- 1978 Costa Rica Country Club.
- 1978 Surgeons and Doctors Association Board.
- 1980 Kamakiri Gallery
- 1983 Enrique Echandi Gallery
- 1991 Heredia City Hall
- 2001 Club Union

He has participated in over 170 group artshows in Costa Rica, El Salvador, Spain, Germany, Venezuela, Brazil, United States, France, Colombia, England and Tokyo.

== Awards ==
- 1972 First Prize: Latin American reform for penitentiary system symposium.
- 1978 Honor Certificate for Annual Watercolor Hall of the Costa Rican Museum of Art
- 1979 First Prize: Oil paint, Heredian painters contest, sponsored by Max Jimenez association (painting: "un amigo").
- 1979 First Prize: National Association of professors' contest. (painting: "los canasteros" -native bags hand crafters-)
- 1982 Honor Certificate for the Chinese Culture contest with the painting "bodegon"
- 1982 Silver Medal for the Second Watercolor Art show Margarita Berthau. (painting: "exterior" -owned by the Costa Rican Art Museum)
- 1982 Honor Certificate for the National Insurance Company 60th anniversary contest. (painting: "psicosis")
- 1985 Gold Medal for the Costa Rican Institute of Tourism 30th anniversary. (painting: "callejón" -the ally- )
- 1994 Gold Medal for Pfizer Grand Prize "Costa Rican Watercolor 5th homenage". (painting: "entrada" -entrance-)
- 1996 "The Best of the Year Award", granted by Costa Rican Government, for his personal add and his art school work.
- 1996 Double Honor Certificate for the Pfizer Grand Prize "Costa Rican Watercolor 7th Homenage" (paintings: "interior" and "exterior" -intaglio technique)
