= St Callixtus College, La Paz =

St Callixtus College
- Spanish: Colegio San Calixto

Location
- Calle Jenaro Sanjinés # 701; La Paz; Bolivia
- Coordinates: 16°29′35.12″S 68°8′6.19″W

Information
- Type: Private primary and secondary
- Motto: In all, love and serve
- Religious affiliation: Catholicism
- Denomination: Jesuit
- Patron saint: Pope Callixtus I
- Established: 1882; 144 years ago
- Director: Enrique Suarez Gobilard
- Teaching staff: 61
- Grades: 1-12
- Gender: Co-educational
- Enrollment: 2,000
- Website: www.sancalixto.edu.bo

St Callixtus College (Spanish: Colegio San Calixto), is a private Catholic primary and secondary school, located in La Paz, Bolivia. The school was founded by the Society of Jesus in 1882, at the instigation of Monsignor Calixto Clavijo, and in his honour named for the third century martyr Pope Callixtus I.

The school began in the residence of Marshal Andrés de Santa Cruz, now a national monument. The Jesuits began teaching with around 40 students. Over the years other works became associated with the Jesuit college including San Calixto Observatory.

Also, the school's Radio Fides was a pioneer in the business, beginning broadcasting in 1939.

== See also ==
- Catholic Church in Bolivia
- Education in Bolivia
- List of Jesuit schools
