= Juvenile MUD =

Portuguese youth political group

The Juvenile Movement of Democratic Unity (Portuguese: Movimento de Unidade Democrática Juvenil or MUD-J) was the youth wing of a Portuguese democratic platform that opposed the dictatorship of António Oliveira Salazar, the Movement of Democratic Unity.

Personalities like Mário Soares, Mário Sacramento, Octávio Pato, Júlio Pomar or Salgado Zenha were members of the Central Committee of the Juvenile MUD. One of its leaders was Sacuntala de Miranda.
