= Teresa Cupertino de Miranda =

Portuguese motor rally driver (1946–2025)

- Born: Maria Teresa de Queiroz Cupertino de Miranda; 14 August 1946; Vila Nova de Famalicão, Portugal
- Died: 30 June 2025 (aged 78); Lisbon District, Portugal
- Occupation: Motor rally driver

Maria Teresa de Queiroz Cupertino de Miranda (1946–2025) was a motor sports enthusiast who was, together with Berta Assunção, the first Portuguese woman to compete in the Dakar Rally, the endurance event for off-road vehicles. In a discipline dominated by men she paved the way for future generations of female rally drivers in Portugal.

== Early life ==
Cupertino was born in the parish of Louro in Vila Nova de Famalicão on 14 August 1946 into one of the ten richest families in Portugal at the time. She was the granddaughter of a wealthy farming couple, Francisco Cupertino de Miranda and Joaquina Nunes de Oliveira. Her father, the youngest of four siblings, was Artur Cupertino de Miranda (1892–1988), founder of the defunct Banco Português do Atlântico. Her mother was Isabel Queiroz. Cupertino married João Cândido Furtado de Antas, with whom she had three daughters. Following the 1974 Carnation Revolution she went to live in Brazil for a decade before returning to Portugal, "determined to travel the world". Her daughter, Maria Madalena, also became a competitive driver, participating with her mother in the 2007 Dakar Rally, which began in the Portuguese capital of Lisbon, and in the Rally of Tunisia in 2008.

== Career ==
Cupertino's first expeditions, Guinea-Bissau to Lisbon, and Paris to Cape Town, took place in 1991 and served as a prelude to her participation in the Dakar Rally. Over the years, she participated in more than 80 trips. Many were undertaken with her partner, José Megre (1942–2009), another historical name in Portuguese motorsport, commonly nicknamed the "father of off-road".

In 1992, Cupertino competed in her first Dakar Rally (formerly known as Paris-Dakar). In that year, the finish was in Cape Town, the longest ever edition of the rally. She drove a Nissan Patrol, together with Berta Assunção and Manuel Caetano as co-drivers. Encouraged by their success in completing the race, she participated with the same vehicle in the Paris-Moscow-Beijing Rally. In the early 2000s, she took part in other events in Portugal and Spain, including the Portuguese National Off-Road Championship, driving a Toyota Land Cruiser. She has stated that what gave her the most pleasure in racing was leaving the men "eating dust". Her final Dakar Rally was in 2007.

Cupertino was a member of the board of directors of the Automobile Club of Portugal (ACP) between 1998 and 2004. She published her memoirs in Viagem Com Meu Olhar (2003). Following in her footsteps, other Portuguese women rally drivers such as Joana Lemos, Céu Pires de Lima, Elisabete Jacinto and Maria Luís Gameiro would emerge.

== Death ==
Cupertino died on June 30, 2025, at the age of 78, after a long illness. Her funeral took place in Estoril.
