= Aída Miranda =

Puerto Rican softball player (born 1959)

Personal information
- Nationality: Puerto Rican
- Born: 1 February 1959 (age 67)

Sport
- Sport: Softball

Aída Miranda (born 1 February 1959) is a Puerto Rican softball player. She competed in the women's tournament at the 1996 Summer Olympics.
