= Pedro Rodriguez de Miranda =

Spanish painter (1696–1766)

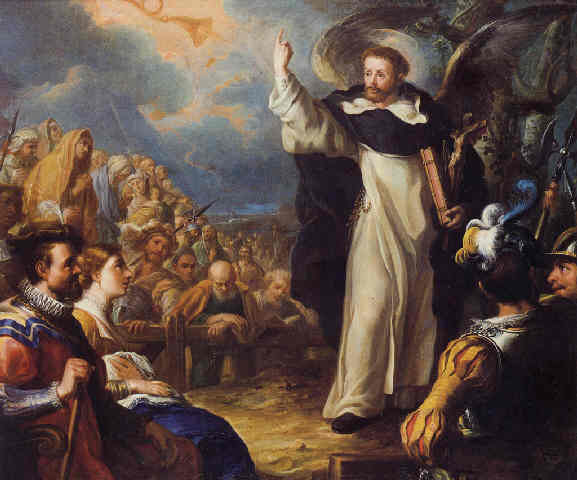
Predicación de san Vicente Ferrer; private collection (attributed)

Pedro Rodríguez de Miranda (1696–1766) was a Spanish painter of the late-Baroque period.

Rodríguez de Miranda was born and died in Madrid. He was the nephew and pupil of the painter Juan García de Miranda. His early patron was Father Aller, the confessor to the prince Philip. He painted scenes from the Life of the blessed Caracciolo for the cloister of the convent of the Holy Spirit in Madrid and the Story of the prophet Elias for the chapel of St. Theresa in the church of the Convent of the barefoot Carmelites. However, he is best known for his peopled landscape and genre paintings. In analogy to the works by the Italian Bamboccianti, these works were referred in Spain as bambochadas. His uncle died and vacated the post of King's painter but Pedro died too soon to effectively fill the slot.
