= Keiye Miranda =

Filipino painter

Katrina "Keiye" Miranda-Tuazon is a modern art painter from Angono, Rizal. Also known as "Keiye Miranda", daughter of the famous painter, Nemesio Miranda Jr. She was known for her underwater pool themed paintings. She had her first solo exhibition at Surrounded by Water in Angono, Rizal and also had a show in a gallery that her family is managing in SM Megamall at the Nemiranda Arthouse where she first started to do her underwater themed painting. She was inspired to continue her underwater-themed paintings after receiving positive feedback from her family and peers.

== Early life ==
Keiye Miranda was born in Angono, Rizal. Keiye is the daughter of the famous artist Nemesio Miranda Jr. known as "Nemiranda". She started stepping into the art world while very young, but participated fully in 1998 by assisting in a gallery, taking some pictures, teaching art and painting. She took up Studio Arts major but decided to shift, thinking that she's not happy in having a deadline so she decided to shift to Visual Communication. She finished her college education in the University of the Philippines Diliman with the course of Fine Arts major in Visual Communication. Keiye is married to Wire Tuazon who is also an artist, and made her name as Katrina Miranda-Tuazon. As she and Wire are both artists, they understand each other's point of view. Even though people can't help but to compare their works, it's never been an issue for them since they both respect each other's work.

== Educational attainment ==
- 1988: Siena College Taytay
- 1992: Cainta Catholic School
- 1998: University of the Philippines, Diliman; Bachelor of Fine Arts, major in Visual Communication

== Work experience ==
Keiye was an Art Facilitator in Harris Development Center for Children in Antipolo City in 1997. From 1995 up to present, she works in Angono Visual Art School (Angono School for Arts), Rizal. 1998-2002 at the Nemiranda Artouse in SM Megamall that her family is managing and in 2000, where she got her first solo exhibition, Surrounded by Water in EDSA. Also in 2000 she worked in NCCA Sambayan Storybook Illustration Workshop. In 2004-2005 in CCP Summer Art Workshop. And in 2007 in Neo-Angono Artists Collective: Commissioned Mural for National Press Club and in the Outreach Program at Talim Island, Binangonan, Rizal.

== Solo exhibitions ==
- 1996: Transcendental Vision; Nemiranda Arthouse in SM Megamall; September 12-October 12
- 2000: Occurrence; Nemiranda Arthouse in SM Megamall; February 11–29
- 2000: Occurrence; Surrounded by Water in EDSA; February 17-March 1
- 2001: Listen; Surrounded by Water in EDSA; March 29-April 14
- 2001: Catharsis; Finale Gallery in SM Megamall; May 15–27
- 2002: Breathe, Finale Gallery in SM Megamall; January 29-February 10
- 2007: Breaking the Silence; Blanc Art Space; July 14-August 4
- 2008: Welcome Interruption; 1/Of Gallery; June 3–14
- 2008: Silent Witness; Finale Art File, Warehouse; November 19-December 9

== Group exhibitions ==
- 1991: U.N.O.; Nemiranda Arthouse, Angono, Rizal; October 5–31
- 1992: Artecology; Goethe Institute Manila; October 10–30
- 1992: Artecology; Nemiranda Arthouse, Angono, Rizal; September 5–30
- 1994: Hit or Miss; UP Faculty Center Gallery; September 5–9
- 1995: Foot & Line; UP Faculty Center Gallery; March 6–10
- 1995: Painting by Numbers; Cultural Center of the Philippines; September 12–30
- 1996: Brain School for Babies; UP Faculty Center Gallery; March 4
- 1998: Third Wave; SBW-Angono; November 15-December 15
- 1998: Songs of Renewal; Casa San Miguel, Zambales; November 29-December 11
- 1998: Re-Print Exchange; Australia Centre; October 15-November 2
- 1998: No Preservatives Added; SBW-Angono; September 27-October 27
- 1998: XPrints; UP Vargas Museum; August 4-September 30
- 1998: Inaugural Exhibition; SBW-Angono; March 29-April 29
- 1998: Crossroads: Terminal Baggage; Australia Centre; February 5–28
- 1999: Dog Show; SBW-Angono; December 19-January 10, 2000
- 1999: Dog Show; SBW-EDSA; December 15–30
- 1999: Colony; Nemiranda Arthouse; December 17-January 7
- 1999: Colony; SBW-Angono; November 21-December 17
- 1999: Daily Planet; SBW-EDSA; October 20-November 14
- 1999: Today Show; Cultural Center of the Philippines; October 6-November 14
- 1999: Coordinates; Boston Gallery; June 5-302008
- 2000: True Confessions; Art Center, SM Megamall; December 13-Jan. 5, 2001
- 2000: Dog Show; SBW Gallery; December 9-January 6, 2001
- 2000: Hudyat: Muling Pagsibol; Nemiranda Arthouse; November 19-December 31
- 2000: Grand Royale; Big Sky Mind; September 24-October 15
- 2000: Colony; UP Vargas Museum; March 7–31
- 2001: Endramada; Pasig City Art Museum; December 22-January 2, 2002
- 2001: Endramada; Nemiranda Arthouse, Angono; November 11–30
- 2001: Portable Landscapes; Luna Artspace, Cebu; September 14-October 5
- 2001: Cool Pieties; Art Center, SM Megamall; August 25-September 8
- 2001: The White Wall; Odd Manila; June 12-July 12
- 2001: Surrounded; Bulwagang Juan Luna, Cultural Center of the Philippines; May 10-June 28
- 2002: Multiple Portables; Plastique Kinetic Worms, Singapore; December 3
- 2002: Feast of Conversations; Atelier Frank & Lee, Singapore; October
- 2002: Recent Works 2; Kulay Diwa Art Galleries; September 22-October 20
- 2002: Mainstream; SBW-Cubao; June 1–29
- 2002: Endramada; UP Vargas Museum; April 5-May 12
- 2003: Picture This; SM Art Center; June 3–20
- 2003: Dwellings; Finale Gallery; May 6–18
- 2003: Density: Making Sense of Dense Cities; Cultural Center of the Phils.; February 18-March
- 2004: RE(CREATION): Re-defining Angono's Traditions; Village Artists Gallery; July 4–25
- 2004: Salida; Village Artists Gallery; March 21 – April 11
- 2005: Flippin’ Out: Maynila to Williamsburgh; Goliath Visual Space, Brooklyn, New York; Sept. 10-Oct. 2
- 2005: The Country Outing; Finale Gallery; June 23-July 5
- 2005: SBW show; Saguijo, Makati; March 28-April 30
- 2006: Balancing Act; Future Prospects; December 9-January 9, 2007
- 2006: The December show; Blanc Art Space; December 6–27
- 2006: SBW Postmodernism is so last season; Green Papaya; December 6–30
- 2006: Dos Por Dos; Boston Gallery; December 2 – January 2, 2007
- 2006: The Way We Get There; West Gallery, West Ave.; July 11–29
- 2007: The December Show; Blanc Art Space; December 2
- 2007: Dogshow; Green Papaya; December 19–31
- 2007: I Have Nothing to Paint & I'm Painting It; Mo Space; August 6
- 2007: In Conversation: T?te-á-T?tes with Bobi V.; 2nd & 3rd Flr. Hallways, CCP; January 11-Feb.3
- 2008: Group show; Ark Gallery, Jakarta; November
- 2008: Inaugural show: Let's open our new home together; Finale Art File; Sept. 25- Oct. 26
- 2008: Young Contemporary Philippines; Richard Koh Fine Art Gallery, Kuala Lumpur, Malaysia; Aug. 23
- 2008: XII: Filipino Contemporary Artists; Artesan, Singapore; June 26-July 17
- 2008: Likhanglila; Kaida Gallery; March 9–26
- 2008: Group show; Museo Iloilo, Iloilo City; Jan. 25-27

== See also ==
- Nemesio Miranda
