= Arsénio Pompílio Pompeu de Carpo =

Portuguese slave trader (1792–1869)

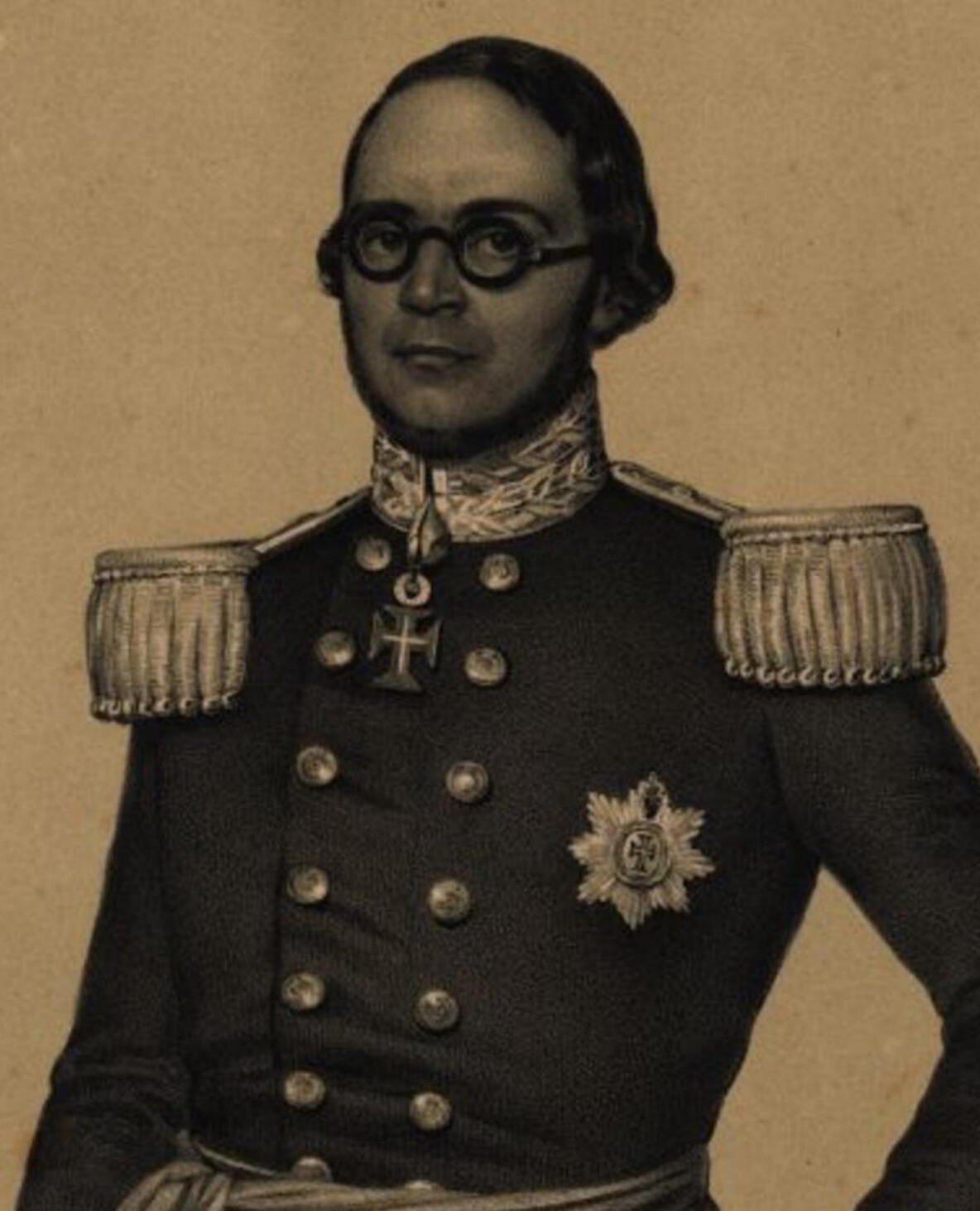
- Portrait by P. Augusto Guglielmi, 1846
- Born: Arsénio dos Santos; 20 December 1792
- Died: 1869 (aged 76–77)

Arsénio Pompílio Pompeu de Carpo (born Arsénio dos Santos; 20 December 1792–1869) was a Portuguese slave trader, freemason, poet and journalist, who was active mainly in Angola and Brazil.

== Early years ==
Born in Funchal in 1792, Arsénio was the son of illiterate unlucky emigrants forced to return to Madeira after a failed attempt to make their fortune in the Portuguese colony of Brazil; he soon started to work as a mason, like his father, but in 1817 he was arrested in Lisbon for joining a plot aiming to overthrow the king João VI led by Gomes Freire de Andrade.

Embarking for Rio de Janeiro in 1820, he changed his family name - Santos - to the pompous Pompílio Pompeu de Carpo, probably borrowing it from theatre, a juvenile passion. Deeply fascinated by Roman sonorities and connotations, Arsénio loved to boast of his presumed classic erudition by quoting Latin authors or evoking personalities such as Titus or Nero. However, the choice of similar names also denotes a touch of megalomania, the evidence of his need to stand out, and it can be considered as the first step towards a career based on self-promotion which culminated in the middle of the 19th century.

== Exile in Angola ==
One of the most remarkable sans-culottes of his time, Arsénio returned to his native island where, in 1823, he was arrested and condemned to a five-year banishment in Portuguese Angola for evoking British protection in case of a secession of Madeira from Portugal, and for his incendiary words and sarcastic remarks on monarchy, church and the saints. Arsénio initially appealed to have his sentence commuted, hoping to serve confinement in a more welcoming location such as Portuguese Cape Verde but eventually decided to withdraw his appeal. According to João Pedro Marques he was probably persuaded by the prospect of quick enrichment through slave trade related activities in Angola. Moreover, it has to be said that this decision could also be influenced by his network of freemason acquaintances.

It seems unlikely that Pompeu de Carpo became a freemason in Portugal, which he left for Angola in 1824 to return, once again as a prisoner, only in 1845. Angolan scholar Carlos Pacheco is inclined to think that he received his initiation in jail, but Brazil is another possible option, since at least until 1834 Dom Miguel's temporary comeback to the throne compelled a relatively significant number of Portuguese liberals to flee to Rio de Janeiro. Of all the contingents of this diaspora, freemasons certainly belonged to the category most persecuted by crown and church. It's probably in this context and thanks to his friend Tomás Tolentino da Silva, cleric at the Funchal cathedral and angry liberal and freemason, that Arsénio got acquainted with freemasonry in general and with the group of Portuguese dissidents who printed the periodical Gazeta Estrela. This publication was known in Angola since the 1820s, but it had to be read undercover because of the measures taken by the Miguelist Governor-General Nicolau de Abreu Castelo Branco, who had outlawed it "for referring irreverently to His Majesty the King and to the highest Portuguese authorities... and for inciting subversive elements to unleash disorder..."

== Slave trading ==
During his confinement period Arsénio de Carpo served in the army, but by the end of the 1820s his military career was cut off by Governor General Nicolau de Abreu Castelo Branco and he became an innkeeper. Back then, in Angola, that was a logic choice for a political exile: inns were privileged gathering places where business, politics and plots were discussed. New ideas fecundated in Angola after the success of the liberal revolutions in Europe and South America and the local imagination was invaded by the inebriant desire of freedom. During the years following the independence of Brazil soldiers and residents were often accused by authorities of supporting "revolutionaries" (a generic name used to define liberals organized in Masonic lodges wishing the unification of Angola and Brazil).

Contacts between innkeepers and slave traders were manifest, since aguardente was Angola's main import to be exchanged in the interior for slaves. Arsénio probably worked also as a representative for a well-established trader between 1826 and 1830. Slave traders tried to exploit the period encompassing the issue of the treaty between Britain and Portugal for the abolition of the slave trade and its coming into force before leaving for Brazil, aware of the fact that Angola would fall on hard times. It seems that Arsénio followed the trend: after serving his ban and after being imprisoned again because of some sonnets mocking the governor's authority, he left Luanda bound for Recife. At least until the 1840s, when Portuguese-Brazilians from Pernambuco hastily left Brazil to settle down in Moçâmedes supported by the Portuguese Crown, Angolan and Brazilian oligarchies traded almost exclusively among themselves and Pernambuco was the main market place dealing with Luanda.

After spending some years in Brazil and in the United States, Arsénio returned to Angola in 1837, where he started working for the slave trader Francisco Teixeira de Miranda – also known as Mirandinha. His main activities consisted in buying goods in America and distributing them to his agents, who travelled to the African interior and exchanged them for slaves. Arsénio promoted then the export of slaves to Brazilian markets, relying upon a web of front men who signed record books and documentation on his behalf, keeping his name unblemished.

This was a risky activity: the ephemeral character of such profession was explained by the fact that officially outlawed slave traders were often no longer able to secure their business by simply bribing the authorities or buying the silence of associates who proved to be too greedy or ambitious.

However, by the time of his return to Luanda, Arsénio was an accomplished and wealthy cosmopolitan gentleman, creating a sensation in the capital for the sophisticated luxury he liked to display. In fact, even if the abolition of the transatlantic traffic had been a serious blow to Luanda traders, instead of renouncing their luxurious lifestyles they tended to turn luxury into a powerful social weapon which, at the same time, allowed them to both confront the central government and obtain respect or recognition from the colonial authorities.

Arsénio de Carpo, as this letter from a British emissary seems to confirm, showed the way:

The only slave trader that I met in Angola lived there as a prince. That was a professional necessity, rather than a matter of extravagance or natural bent for luxury. A slave trader basically depends on authorities' tolerance and benevolence: the only way to attract powerful friends is to act as a magnate, being generous, holding parties and gatherings. It's not different from a diplomat's life.

== Political career ==
By the end of the 1830s, the Portuguese government produced the first serious effort aimed at ending slave smuggling, provoking an inevitable clash with Luanda families involved in the traffic. Arsénio de Carpo, elected interim president of the Luanda Municipal Council in 1837, rapidly became their leader. Taking advantage of his literary skills, he wrote several times to Lisbon asking for the perpetuation of the traffic and accusing "overzealous ministers and ill-informed councillors" of unleashing an abolitionist storm over Portuguese Angola, instigated by the grim British allies. His point was that an abrupt application of the abolitionist law would have been equal to a death sentence for Portugal, Spain and Brazil.

Already in his seventies and unable to bear the pressure, the Prime Minister of Portugal, António de Noronha, resigned. The slave traders gained some time and, strongly backed by the Septembrist front, now in power, Arsénio de Carpo pursued a career in politics, presenting himself as a candidate to both the senate and the Cortes, hoping - in vain - to be elected as the representative for Angola.

During this period he also managed the supply of British ships at the harbour of Luanda, profusely offering his estates to influent British friends, who apparently ignored that their man in Luanda was one of the last slave traders in the area. In 1848 he even travelled to London and paid homage to Queen Victoria. His purpose was to promote the creation of a Portuguese West Africa Company and to raise funds for the construction of a steam sawmill on the banks of the Kwanza River and a railway connecting Luanda to Calumbo.

However, by the middle 1840s Portugal could no longer tolerate ambiguities, crushed as it was between the persistent pressure exerted by Britain and France in order to achieve the full application of the decree on slave trade abolition and the desperate need to affirm its authority in Africa. In 1842 a military coup in Portugal, led by António Bernardo da Costa Cabral promulgated the restoration of the 1826 Constitutional Charter, abolished by the September Revolution in 1836. The Cabralist regime remained in power, with brief interruptions, until the Regeneration (1851). Cabralism is normally associated with the right wing of the liberal movement, while the previous regime - Septembrism - is usually associated with the left wing. Governor General Pedro Alexandrino da Cunha, who considered Arsénio de Carpo the greatest slave trader of the region and the colony's public enemy number one, expelled him as soon as he set foot in Angola.

== Exile and return ==
Arsénio de Carpo was forced to move to Lisbon where, backed up by Septembrist left wing press and freemasonry, he had the chance to maintain his standard of living. Discharged for lack of evidence from the accusation of slave trade and misuse of power as a member of the Luanda Municipal Council, Arsénio de Carpo savoured his triumph and posed a further menace to his Cabralist opponents, when he unsuccessfully presented himself for the position of Governor General of Angola. In 1849, as soon as Pedro Alexandrino da Cunha left the province, Arsénio de Carpo returned to Luanda, re-established his network and then tried to do the same in Brazil. Unfortunately for him, in this period the Brazilian Empire too started to take appropriate disciplinary action in order to dismantle the slave traffic. Arrested in Rio de Janeiro and expelled from the empire, Arsénio returned to Luanda discredited and financially ruined. Put on trial for insolvency, he was sentenced to ten years to serve in São Tomé Island on Portuguese São Tomé and Príncipe.

== Final years ==
Already approaching his sixties, Arsénio was granted the chance to be transferred to the Castle of São Jorge, in Lisbon. In 1853, his conviction revoked, he was free to return to Angola. Back in Luanda, he spent his last years desperately trying to restore his discredited reputation: he published the documentation attesting to his presumed innocence and made a living out of legal trade. He never managed to get rid of the tag of slave smuggler. He died in 1869.
