= The Women's Venture Fund =

The Women's Venture Fund is a non-profit organization dedicated to helping women of diverse backgrounds to establish businesses in urban communities from New York.

The Women's Venture Fund offers training, small business loans, and a network of business advisors to help women reach their business goals.

== History ==
In 1994, Maria Otero, WVF's Founder and President, quit practicing law to create WVF.

In 2003, Bloomberg reported that the U.S. Small Business Administration awarded Women's Venture Fund a $750,000 grant and recognized it as a "sustainable" business center.

In 2007, it was among over 530 New York City arts and social service institutions to receive part of a $20 million grant from the Carnegie Corporation, which was made possible through a donation by New York City mayor Michael Bloomberg.

== Locations ==
The Women's Venture Fund (WVF) has an office located at 220 Fifth Avenue, New York, NY 10001. The New York office first opened in 1997 which has provided technical assistance services to women entrepreneurs and over $1.5 million in funding to women owned businesses. WVF offers programs that address the business needs of minority and low-income women of urban communities.
