= David Miranda (cyclist) =

Salvadorean cyclist

Personal information
- Born: 10 December 1942 (age 83) Santa Ana, El Salvador

Cycling career
- Sport: Cycling

David Miranda (born 10 December 1942) is a Salvadoran former cyclist. He competed in the individual road race at the 1968 Summer Olympics.
