= Flix Miranda =

Puerto Rican-American electrical engineer

Flix Miranda from the NASA Glenn Research Center in Cleveland, Ohio, was named Fellow of the Institute of Electrical and Electronics Engineers (IEEE) in 2014 "for contributions to high-temperature superconductors and ferroelectric tunable microwave components for satellite communications".
