= Olayinka Miranda Burney-Nicol =

Sierra Leonean visual artist (born 1927)

"Olayinka" Miranda Burney Nicol
- Born: 1927; Freetown, Sierra Leone
- Died: 1996 (aged 68–69)
- Movement: Modern
- Children: Eddie Davies

"Olayinka" Miranda Burney-Nicol was a multidisciplinary visual artist who worked primarily as a painter and printmaker. She was born in 1927 in Freetown, Sierra Leone. Throughout her life, she studied internationally at various art schools in New York and various European countries. Upon return to Sierra Leone, she worked for the government as the lead artist of the Sierra Leone Ministry of Education. During this time in 1958 she created many murals for the government. She is considered a pioneer of modern art in Sierra Leone.

== Art ==
Her art blends influences from her upbringing as a Krio Sierra Leonean with that of her exposure to art across America, Europe, and Asia. References are made to the indigenous Sierra Leonean culture which differed from her own identity.

The subject matter of her paintings, prints, and carvings revolve around the culture of Freetown, Sierra Leone during the post-colonial period in which she was raised. Her work often features women, masquerade, and religious references.

Some of her pieces currently reside at the Hampton Harmon Foundation Modern African Art Collection and other museums around the world.
