= Hugo Miranda (footballer) =

Paraguayan footballer (born 1980)

Personal information
- Full name: Hugo Miranda
- Date of birth: 8 August 1980 (age 46)
- Place of birth: Asunción, Paraguay
- Height: 1.85 m (6 ft 1 in)
- Position: Defender

Senior career*
Years	Team	Apps	(Gls)
2002–2004	Sport Colombia	?	(?)
2005–2008	MyPa	88	(6)
2009	Cerro Porteño	0	(0)
2009	Olimpia	0	(0)
2009	Total Chalaco	6	(0)
2010–2011	FC Lahti	41	(3)
2012	Sport Colombia		
2013	FF Jaro	7	(0)
- * Club domestic league appearances and goals as of 15 July 2010

Hugo Miranda (born 8 August 1980) is a former football defender from Paraguay who last played for Finnish club FF Jaro in the Veikkausliiga.

== Career ==
Miranda started his career in 2002 with Sport Colombia in the Paraguayan Primera División. In 2005, he transferred to MyPa of Finland.
