= Francisco Teixeira de Miranda =

Brazilian slave trader

Francisco Teixeira de Miranda, also known as Mirandinha, was a Brazilian slave trader in Luanda in the 1830s and 1840s. In 1843 he was convicted of having imported 47 captives via the sea. His collection of artworks and documents now form part of museum exhibits on the slave trade in the National Museum of Brazil. From 1837 he employed the slave trader Arsénio Pompílio Pompeu de Carpo.
