= Jose Miranda (soccer) =

American soccer player and coach

Personal information
- Place of birth: Tucson, Arizona, United States
- Positions: Forward; midfielder

College career
Years	Team	Apps	(Gls)
1990–1991	Yavapai Roughriders		
1992–1993	Sangamon State Prairie Stars		

Senior career*
Years	Team	Apps	(Gls)
1989–1990	Tucson Amigos (indoor)		
1996	New Mexico Chiles		
1997	Arizona Sahuaros		
2000	Tucson Fireballs	14	(0)

Managerial career
- 2009–: Pima Aztecs (women's assistant)
- * Club domestic league appearances and goals

Jose Miranda is an American retired soccer player who is an assistant coach with the Pima College women's soccer team.

In 1989, Miranda joined the Tucson Amigos for the 1989–90 Southwest Independent Soccer League. He earned Rookie of the Year honors with the Amigos. Miranda graduated from Sunnyside High School. In 1990, Miranda entered Yavapai College where he was a member of the 1990 National Junior College Champions and 1991 National Junior College Runner-Up men's soccer teams. He then transferred to Sangamon State for the 1992 and 1993 seasons. In 1993, Sangamon State won the NAIA national men's soccer championship. In 1996, Miranda played for the New Mexico Chiles in the USISL Select League. In 1997, he moved to the Arizona Sahuaros of the USISL D-3 Pro League. He broke his leg during the season. This led to his taking the boys' head coaching position at Sunnyside High School. He returned to playing in 2000 with the Tucson Fireballs. In 2009, Miranda became an assistant coach of the women's team at Pima Community College. Miranda has also coached with FC Tucson in USL League Two.
