= God Is Love Pentecostal Church =

Pentecostal Christian denomination in Brazil

The God Is Love Pentecostal Church (IPDA) (Portuguese: Igreja Pentecostal Deus É Amor) is a Pentecostal trinitarian Christian denomination in Brazil. The headquarters are in São Paulo.

== History ==
The Igreja Pentecostal Deus é Amor was founded in São Paulo on 3 June 1962 by David Martins de Miranda (or David Miranda). The spread of the IPDA and other pentecostal churches was encouraged by economic regression, urbanization and the emergence of the informal settlements since the 1950s, where the IPDA gained most of its new followers at this time. Among the poorest, promises of "the miracle that will free them from their situation", fell on fertile grounds. By 1995 it had spread to 30 other countries, with a membership of 800,000 members in 2001 Census. As of 2003, there were 8,140 churches. In 2004, the church inaugurated the Temple of the Glory of God in São Paulo, with an auditorium of 60,000 seats.

== Beliefs ==
The denomination has a Pentecostal confession of faith and its doctrine belongs to the Finished Work Pentecostalism. The organisation's emphasis is on faith healing, deliverance ministry, laying on of hands, anointing of the sick, baptism with the Holy Spirit, signs and wonders and evangelism. The church has several radio stations, where church programs as well as live healing and deliverance services are broadcast. Compared to other Brazilian Pentecostal churches, Deus é Amor is of a fundamentalist christian ideology and separates itself from society.

== Controversies ==
The IPDA has established strict control mechanisms to survey the presence of its followers. Members of the churches have to obtain "faith cards", which must be stamped each day of the week to prove their presence at the worship service and the obligatorial payment to the church. The organization, together with Edir Macedo's Igreja Universal do Reino de Deus, is accused of using the acquisition of the Edificio Cines Plaza y Central cinema in Montevideo, Uruguay as a disguise to cover up money laundering. Furthermore, the IPDA is accused to have connections to the organized crime scene of Brazil. Many former favela gang members work as pastors after their conversion.
