= Hugo Sánchez Miranda =

Mexican politician (born 1968)

- Born: 10 October 1968 (age 57); Jiutepec, Morelos, Mexico
- Occupation: Politician
- Political party: PAN

Hugo Lino Sánchez Miranda (born 10 October 1968) is a Mexican politician from the National Action Party. In 2012 he served as Deputy of the LXI Legislature of the Mexican Congress representing the Federal District.
