= Hispanism =

Study of culture of the Spanish-speaking world

Hispanism (sometimes referred to as Hispanic studies or Spanish studies) is the study of the literature and culture of the Spanish-speaking world, principally that of Spain and Hispanic America. It may also entail studying Spanish language and cultural history in the United States and in other presently or formerly Spanish-speaking countries in Africa, Asia, and the Pacific, such as Equatorial Guinea and the former Spanish East Indies.

A hispanist is a scholar specializing in Hispanicism. It was used in an article by Miguel de Unamuno in 1908 referring to 'el hispanista italiano Farinelli', and was discussed at length for the U.S. by Hispanist Richard L. Kagan of Johns Hopkins University. The work carried out by Hispanists includes translations of literature and they may specialize in certain genres, authors or historical periods of the Iberian Peninsula and Hispanic America, etc.

== Origins ==
During the 16th century, Spain was a motor of innovation in Europe, given its links to new lands, subjects, literary sorts and personages, dances, and fashions. This hegemonic status, also advanced by commercial and economic interests, generated interest in learning the Spanish language, as Spain was the dominant political power and was the first to develop an overseas empire in post-Renaissance Europe. In order to respond to that interest, some Spanish writers developed a new focus on the Spanish language as subject matter. In 1492 Antonio de Nebrija published his Gramática castellana, the first published grammar of a modern European language. Juan de Valdés composed his Diálogo de la lengua (1533) for his Italian friends, who were eager to learn Castilian. And the lawyer Cristóbal de Villalón wrote in his Gramática castellana (Antwerp, 1558) that Castilian was spoken by Flemish, Italian, English, and French persons.

For many years, especially between 1550 and 1670, European presses published a large number of Spanish grammars and dictionaries that linked Spanish to one or more other languages. Two of the oldest grammars were published anonymously in Louvain: Útil y breve institución para aprender los Principios y fundamentos de la lengua Hespañola (1555) and Gramática de la lengua vulgar de España (1559).

Among the more outstanding foreign authors of Spanish grammars were the Italians Giovanni Mario Alessandri (1560) and Giovanni Miranda (1566); the English Richard Percivale (1591), John Minsheu (1599) and Lewis Owen (1605); the French Jean Saulnier (1608) and Jean Doujat (1644); the German Heinrich Doergangk (1614); and the Dutch Carolus Mulerius (1630).

Dictionaries were composed by the Italian Girolamo Vittori (1602), the Englishman John Torius (1590) and the Frenchmen Jacques Ledel (1565), Diccionario muy copioso de la lengua española y francesa en el qual son declaradas todas las palabras castellanas y francesas con sus proprias y naturales significaciones sacadas de muchos y muy excelentes autores antiguos y modernos Jean Palet (1604) and Vocabulario para facilmente ... deprender á ler, escrebir y hablar la lengua castellana ... por D. Francisco Huillery ... Vocabulaire pour apprendre ... à lire, écrire et parler la langue espagnolle ... composé par Me François Huillery, sieur de la Porte dorée ... François Huillery (1661). The lexicographical contribution of the German Heinrich Hornkens (1599) and of the Franco-Spanish author Pere Lacavallería (1642) were also important to French Hispanism.

Others combined grammars and dictionaries. The works of the Englishman Richard Percivale (1591), Frenchman César Oudin (1597, 1607), Italians Lorenzo Franciosini (1620, 1624) and Arnaldo de la Porte (1659, 1669) and Austrian Nicholas Mez von Braidenbach (1666, 1670) were especially relevant. Franciosini and Oudin also translated Don Quixote. This list is far from complete and the grammars and dictionaries in general had a great number of versions, adaptations, reprintings and even translations (Oudin's Grammaire et observations de langue espagnolle, for example, was translated into Latin and English). This is why it is not possible to exaggerate the great impact that the Spanish language had in the Europe of the 16th and 17th centuries.

In the 19th century, coinciding with the loss of the Spanish colonial empire and the birth of new Spanish American republics, Europe and the United States showed a renewed interest in Hispanic history, literature and culture of the declining great power and its now independent former colonies. Inside Spain, after the country lost definitely its empire in the Spanish defeat in 1898, calls for cultural regeneration and a new conception of identity based in language and humanities began to emerge.

During the Romantic period, the image of a Moorish and exotic medieval Spain, a picturesque country with a mixed cultural heritage, captured the imagination of many writers. This led many to become interested in Spanish literature, legends, and traditions. Travel books written at that time maintained and intensified that interest, and led to a more serious and scientific approach to the study of Spanish and Spanish American culture. This field did not have a word coined to name it until the early 20th century, when it ended up being called Hispanism.

Hispanism has traditionally been defined as the study of the Spanish and Spanish-American cultures, and particularly of their language by foreigners or people generally not educated in Spain. The Instituto Cervantes has promoted the study of Spanish and Hispanic culture around the world, similar to the way in which institutions such as the British Council, the Alliance Française or the Goethe Institute have done for their own countries.

== Criticism ==
Hispanism as an organizing rubric has been criticized by scholars in Spain and in Spanish America. The term "attempts to appropriate Latin-American topics and subordinate them to a Spanish centre,” observes Jeffrey Herlihy-Mera. “The nomenclatures have a radial implication which both initiates and sanctions the flawed concept that all cultural materials under this heading emanate from a singular source: the Peninsula.” The rise of “Hispanism” as a term, notes Joan Ramon Resina, “in Spain as in Latin America, was accomplished for the purpose of political administration and obedience to Castilian rule through methods of domination that eventually led to independence and the birth (rather than fragmentation) of a constellation of republics.” He goes on to say that “it is incumbent on us to face up to the possibility that Hispanism no longer has a future in the university.” While Nicolas Shumway believes Hispanism “is an outmoded idea based on an essentialist, ideologically driven, and Spain-centric, notions,” Carlos Alonso maintains the field of Hispanism “must be rethought and exploded.”

=== In the Philippines ===
In the Philippines, the Hispanists (or hispanista in Tagalog) are a term that has become associated with white washing, colonial mentality and cultural cringe for the past years. In particular, it has surfaced in social media as a bias on Philippine history that regards the colonizers and conquistadors as heroes and "civilizers", and the Philippine national heroes like Andres Bonifacio and Lapulapu as the "villains".

Issues and reactions had stirred on the so-called hispanista movement of Spanish restoration for their radicalism. Claims and historical narratives in the social media have included proposing to “replace” the current Filipino as the country's official language, alluding to the country's status as a former Spanish Empire colony. The anti-Tagalog bias and the demand to credit cultural achievements in the Filipino culture to the Spanish colonizers have resulted in backlash and a negative reputation for online supporters of these ideas in the Philippines.

== World influence ==
=== Hispanic America ===
In the late 19th century Uruguayan José Enrique Rodó and Cuban José Martí were writers stressing the value of Spanish language and cultural heritage as part of the construction of an identity for the new Hispanic American independent nations.

=== Great Britain and Ireland ===
The first Spanish book translated into English was the Celestina, as an adaptation in verse published in London between 1525 and 1530 by John Rastell. It includes only the first four acts and is based on the Italian version of Alfonso de Ordóñez; it is often referred to as an Interlude, and its original title is A New Comedy in English in Manner of an Interlude Right Elegant and Full of Craft of Rhetoric: Wherein is Shewed and Described as well the Beauty and Good Properties of Women, as Their Vices and Evil Conditions with a Moral Conclusion and Exhortation to Virtue.. The Scottish poet William Drummond (1585–1649) translated Garcilaso de la Vega and Juan Boscán. The English knew the masterpieces of Castilian literature, from early translations of Amadís de Gaula by Garci Rodriguez de Montalvo and the Cárcel de amor by Diego de San Pedro. Sir Philip Sidney had read Los siete libros de la Diana by the Hispano-Portuguese Jorge de Montemayor, whose poetry influenced him greatly. John Bourchier translated Libro de Marco Aurelio by Antonio de Guevara. David Rowland translated Lazarillo de Tormes in 1586, which may have inspired the first English picaresque novel, The Unfortunate Traveller (1594), by Thomas Nashe. By the end of the 16th century, the Celestina had been translated fully (in London, J. Wolf, 1591; Adam Islip, 1596; William Apsley, 1598; and others). Some of the translators of that time traveled or lived for some time in Spain, such as Lord Berners, Bartholomew Yong, Thomas Shelton, Leonard Digges and James Mabbe. William Cecil (Lord Burghley; 1520–1598) owned the largest Spanish library in the United Kingdom.

Elizabethan theater also felt the powerful influence of the Spanish Golden Age. John Fletcher, a frequent collaborator of Shakespeare, borrowed from Miguel de Cervantes's Don Quixote for his Cardenio, possibly written in collaboration with Shakespeare, who is thought to have read Juan Luis Vives. Fletcher's frequent collaborator Francis Beaumont also imitated Don Quixote in the more well-known The Knight of the Burning Pestle. Fletcher also borrowed from other works by Cervantes, including Los trabajos de Persiles y Segismunda for his The Custom of the Country and La ilustre fregona for his beautiful young saleswoman. Cervantes also inspired Thomas Middleton and William Rowley, with his La gitanilla (one of the Novelas ejemplares) influencing their The Spanish Gipsy (1623).

The first translation of Don Quixote into a foreign language was the English version by Thomas Shelton (first part, 1612; second, 1620). And Don Quixote was imitated in the satirical poem Hudibras (1663–78), composed by Samuel Butler. In addition, the works of some great Golden Age poets were translated into English by Richard Fanshawe, who died in Madrid. As early as 1738, a luxurious London edition of Don Quixote in Spanish was published, prepared by the Sephardic Cervantist Pedro Pineda, with an introduction by Gregorio Mayans and ornate engravings. Also in the 18th century two new translations of Don Quixote were published, one by the painter Charles Jervas (1742) and one by Tobias Smollett, a writer of picaresque novels (1755). Smollet appears as an avid reader of Spanish narrative, and that influence is always present in his works. Meanwhile, the best work of the 17th-century writer Charlotte Lennox is The Female Quixote (1752), which was inspired by Cervantes. Cervantes also was the inspiration for The Spiritual Quixote, by Richard Graves. Thwe first critical and annotated edition of Don Quixote was that of the English clergyman John Bowle (1781). The novelists Henry Fielding and Laurence Sterne also were familiar with the works of Cervantes.

Among the British travellers in Spain in the 18th century who left written testimony of their travels are (chronologically) John Durant Breval, Thomas James, Wyndham Beawes, James Harris, Richard Twiss, Francis Carter, William Dalrymple, Philip Thicknesse, Henry Swinburne, John Talbot Dillon, Alexander Jardine, Richard Croker, Richard Cumberland, Joseph Townsend, Arthur Young, William Beckford, John Macdonald (Memoirs of an Eighteenth-Century Footman), Robert Southey and Neville Wyndham.

Other English travel writers who straddled the 18th and 19th centuries include John Hookham Frere, Henry Richard Vassall-Fox, better known as Lord Holland (1773–1840), a great friend of Gaspar Melchor de Jovellanos and Manuel José Quintana, and benefactor of José María Blanco White. Lord Holland visited Spain on numerous occasions and wrote his impressions about those trips. He also collected books and manuscripts and wrote a biography of Lope de Vega. His home was open to all Spaniards, but especially to the liberal émigrés who arrived in the London district of Somers Town in the 19th century, fleeing the absolutist repression of King Ferdinand VII and the religious and ideological dogmatism of the country. Many of them subsisted by translating or teaching their language to English people, most of whom were interested in conducting business with Spanish America, although others wished to learn about Spanish medieval literature, much in vogue among the Romantics. One of the émigrés, Antonio Alcalá Galiano, taught Spanish literature as a professor at the University of London in 1828 and published his notes. The publisher Rudolph Ackerman established a great business publishing Catecismos (text books) on different matters in Spanish, many of them written by Spanish émigrés, for the new Spanish-American republics. Matthew G. Lewis set some of his works in Spain. And the protagonist of Jane Austen's Abbey of Northanger is deranged by her excessive reading of Gothic novels, much as was Don Quixote with his books of chivalry.

Sir Walter Scott was an enthusiastic reader of Cervantes and tried his hand at translation. He dedicated his narrative poem The Vision of Roderick (1811) to Spain and its history. Thomas Rodd translated some Spanish folk ballads. Lord Byron also was greatly interested in Spain and was a reader of Don Quixote. He translated the ballad Ay de mi Alhama in part of his Childe Harold and Don Juan. Richard Trench translated Pedro Calderón de la Barca and was friends with some of the emigrated Spaniards, some of whom wrote in both English and Spanish, such as José María Blanco White and Telesforo de Trueba y Cossío, and many of whom (including Juan Calderón, who held a chair of Spanish at King's College), spread knowledge of the Spanish language and its literature. John Hookham Frere was a friend of the Duke of Rivas when the latter was in Malta, and Hookham translated some medieval and classical poetry into English. The brothers Jeremiah Holmes Wiffen and Benjamin B. Wiffen were both scholars of Spanish culture. The "Lake Poet" Robert Southey, translated Amadís de Gaula and Palmerín de Inglaterra into English, among others works. English novelists were strongly influenced by Cervantes. Especially so was Charles Dickens, who created a quixotic pair in Mr. Pickwick and Sam Weller of Posthumous Papers of the Pickwick Club. John Ormsby translated the Cantar de Mio Cid and Don Quixote. Percy Bysshe Shelley left traces of his devotion to Calderón de la Barca in his work. The polyglot John Bowring traveled to Spain in 1819 and published the observations of his trip. Other accounts of travel in Spain include those of Richard Ford, whose Handbook for Travellers in Spain (1845) was republished in many editions, and George Borrow, author of the travelogue The Bible in Spain, which was translated into Castilian by Manuel Azaña, the poet and translator Edward Fitzgerald, and the literary historian James Fitzmaurice-Kelly, who was mentor to a whole British generation of Spanish scholars such as Edgar Allison Peers and Alexander A. Parker. Other outstanding Hispanists include the following:

- Francis William Pierce, Irish student of the epic poetry of the Golden Age;
- John Brande Trend, a historian of Spanish music;
- Edward Meryon Wilson, who translated the Soledades of Luis de Góngora (1931);
- Norman David Shergold, student of the Spanish auto sacramental;
- John E. Varey, who documented the evolution of the paratheatrical forms in the Golden Age;

as well as Geoffrey Ribbans; William James Entwistle; Peter Edward Russell; Nigel Glendinning; Brian Dutton; Gerald Brenan; John H. Elliott; Raymond Carr; Henry Kamen; John H. R. Polt; Hugh Thomas; Colin Smith; Edward C. Riley; Keith Whinnom; Paul Preston; Alan Deyermond; Ian Michael; and Ian Gibson.

The Association of Hispanists of Great Britain and Ireland (AHGBI) was founded in 1955 by a group of university professors at St. Andrews, and since then it has held congresses annually. The AHGBI played a decisive role in the creation of the Asociación Internacional de Hispanistas (AIH), whose first congress was held at Oxford in 1962.

=== Germany, Austria and Switzerland ===
Aside from the imitation of the picaresque novel by Hans Jakob Christoffel von Grimmelshausen, Hispanism bloomed in Germany around the enthusiasm that German Romantics had for Miguel de Cervantes, Calderón de la Barca, and Gracián. Friedrich Diez (1794–1876) can be considered the first German philologist to give prominence to Spanish, in his Grammatik der romanischen Sprachen (1836–1843) and his Etymologisches Wörterbuch der romanischen Sprachen (1854). His first Spanish-related work, Altspanische Romanzen, was published in 1819.

Important to the promotion of Hispanism in Germany was a group of Romantic writers that included Ludwig Tieck, an orientalist and poet who translated Don Quixote into German (1799–1801); Friedrich Bouterwek, author of the unorthodox Geschichte der Poesie und Beredsamkeit seit dem Ende des dreizehnten Jahrhunderts and translator of the Cervantes short farce El juez de los divorcios; and August Wilhelm Schlegel (1767–1845), who translated works of Calderón de la Barca (Spanisches Theater, 1803–1809) and Spanish classical poetry into German. The philologist and folklorist Jakob Grimm published Silva de romances viejos (Vienna, 1816) with a prologue in Spanish. Juan Nicolás Böhl de Faber, German consul in Spain, was a devoted student of Calderón de la Barca, of Spanish classical theater generally, and of traditional popular literature. The philologist Wilhelm von Humboldt traveled through Spain taking notes and was interested especially in the Basque language, and the philosopher Arthur Schopenhauer was an avid reader and translator of Gracián. Count Adolf Friedrich von Schack (1815–1894) made a trip to Spain in 1852 to study the remnants of the Moorish civilization and became a devoted scholar of things Spanish.

Hispanists of German, Austrian, and Swiss origins include Franz Grillparzer, Wendelin Förster, Karl Vollmöller, Adolf Tobler, Heinrich Morf, Gustav Gröber, Gottfried Baist, and Wilhelm Meyer-Lübke. Among them are two emigrants to Chile, Rodolfo Lenz (1863–1938), whose works include his Diccionario etimolójico de las voces chilenas derivadas de lenguas indíjenas americanas (1904) and Chilenische Studien (1891), as well as other works on grammar and the Spanish of the Americas; and Friedrich Hanssen (1857–1919), author of Spanische Grammatik auf historischer Grundlage (1910; revised ed. in Spanish, Gramática histórica de la lengua castellana, 1913), as well as other works on Old Spanish philology, Aragonese dialectology, and the Spanish of the Americas. The Handbuch der romanischen Philologie (1896) by Wilhelm Meyer-Lübke was a classic in Spain, as were his Grammatik der romanischen Sprachen (1890–1902), Einführung in das Studium der romanischen Sprachwissenschaft (1901) (translated into Spanish), and Romanisches etymologisches Wörterbuch (1935). Johannes Fastenrath, through his translations and other works, spread the Spanish culture among his contemporaries; in addition, he created the prize that bears his name in the Spanish Royal Academy, to reward the best works in Spanish poetry, fiction, and essays. The Austrian Romance scholar Ferdinand Wolf, a friend of Agustín Durán, was particularly interested in the romancero, in the lyric poetry of the medieval Spanish cancioneros, and in other medieval folk poetry; he also studied Spanish authors who had resided in Vienna, such as Cristóbal de Castillejo. The Swiss scholar Heinrich Morf edited the medieval Poema de José (Leipzig, 1883). The works of Karl Vossler and Ludwig Pfandl on linguistic idealism and literary stylistics were widely read in Spain. Calderón studies in Germany were advanced by the editions of Max Krenkel. Other important authors were Emil Gessner, who wrote Das Altleonesische (Old Leonese) (Berlin 1867); Gottfried Baist, who produced an edition of Don Juan Manuel's Libro de la caza (1880), as well as the outline of a historical grammar of Spanish, Die spanische Sprache, in the encyclopedia of Romance philology published by Gustav Gröber in 1888; Hugo Schuchardt, known for his study of Spanish flamenco music, Die cantes flamencos; and Armin Gassner, who wrote Das altspanische Verbum (the Old Spanish verb) (1897), as well as a work on Spanish syntax (1890) and several articles on Spanish pronouns between 1893 and 1895. And Moritz Goldschmidt wrote Zur Kritik der altgermanischen Elemente im Spanischen (Bonn 1887), the first work on the influences of the Germanic languages on Spanish.

Authors who made more specialized contributions to Hispanic philology include the following:

- Werner Beinhauer (colloquial Spanish, phraseology, idioms);
- Joseph Brüch (Germanic influences, historical phonetics);
- Emil Gamillscheg (Germanic influences on the languages of the Iberian Peninsula, toponymy, Basques, and Romans);
- Wilhelm Giese (etymology, dialectology and popular culture, Guanche loanwords in Spanish, the pre-Roman substrate, Judeo-Spanish);
- Rudolf Grossmann (loanwords in the Spanish of the River Plate region, Spanish and Spanish-American literature, Latin American culture);
- Helmut Hatzfeld (stylistics, language of Don Quixote);
- Heinrich Kuen (linguistic situation of the Iberian Peninsula, typology of Spanish);
- Alwin Kuhn (Aragonese dialectology, formation of the Romance languages);
- Fritz Krüger (dialectology, ethnography);
- Harri Meier (historical linguistics, etymology, formation of the Romance languages, dialectology, linguistic typology);
- Joseph M. Piel (toponymy and anthroponymy of the Ibero-Romance languages);
- Gerhard Rohlfs (historical linguistics, etymology, toponymy, dialectology, language and culture);
- Hugo Schuchardt (Spanish etymologies, pre-Roman languages, dialectology, creole languages, Basque studies);
- Friedrich Schürr (historical phonetics, lexicology);
- Leo Spitzer (etymology, syntax, stylistics, and lexicology of Spanish);
- Günther Haensch and Arnald Steiger (Arabic influences on Spanish, Mozarabic language);
- Karl Vossler (stylistics, characterization of the Spanish language, studies of Spanish literature and culture);
- Edmund Schramm (author of a biography of Juan Donoso Cortés and an Unamuno scholar);
- Max Leopold Wagner (Spanish of the Americas, studies on Gypsy dialect and slang, dialectology);
- Adolf Zauner (author of Altspanisches Elementarbuch (manual of Old Spanish, 1907).

Fritz Krüger created the famous Hamburg School (not to be confused with the pop music genre of the 1980s, of the same name), which applied the principles of the Wörter und Sachen movement, founded earlier by Swiss and German philologists such as Hugo Schuchardt, Ruduolf Meringer, and Wilhelm Meyer-Lübke, aptly combining dialectology and ethnography. Between 1926 and 1944 Krüger directed the journal Volkstum und Kultur der Romane and its supplements (1930–1945). It totaled 37 volumes, in which many of his students published their works. Krüger wrote mainly on Hispanic dialectology, especially on that of western Spain (Extremadura and Leon) and the Pyrenees, and he traveled on foot to gather the materials for his monumental work Die Hochpyrenäen, in which he meticulously described the landscape, flora, fauna, material culture, popular traditions and dialects of the Central Pyrenees. The versatile Romance scholar Gerhard Rohlfs investigated the languages and the dialects of both sides of the Pyrenees and their elements in common, as well as pre-Roman substrate languages of the Iberian Peninsula and Guanche loanwords.

The works of Karl Vossler, founder of the linguistic school of idealism, include interpretations of Spanish literature and reflections on the Spanish culture. Vossler, along with Helmut Hatzfeld and Leo Spitzer, began a new school of stylistics based on aesthetics, which focused on the means of expression of various authors.

The early twentieth century marked the founding of two German institutions dedicated to Hispanic Studies (including Catalan, Galician and the Portuguese), in Hamburg and Berlin respectively. The University of Hamburg's Iberoamerikanisches Forschungsinstitut (Ibero-American Research Institute) was, from its founding in 1919 until the 1960s, almost the only German university institution dedicated to Spanish and other languages of the Iberian Peninsula. The Institute published the journal Volkstum und Kultur der Romanen (1926–1944), devoted specifically to works on dialectology and popular culture, following, in general, patterns of the Wörter und Sachen school. Meanwhile, Berlin's Ibero-Amerikanisches Institut was founded in 1930. Today, the Berlin institute houses Europe's largest library dedicated to studies of Spain, Portugal, and Latin America, and to the languages of these countries (including Catalan, Galician, Portuguese, Basque, and the indigenous languages of the Americas). The Ibero-Amerikanisches Institut in Berlin is engaged in research in the fields of literature, linguistics, ethnology, history, and art history.

Under the Nazi regime (1933–1945), German philology went through a difficult time. Some Romanists, through their work, praised and propagated the Nazi ideology. Meanwhile, others lost their professorships or underwent anti-Jewish persecution (such as Yakov Malkiel and Leo Spitzer, both of whom emigrated), by falling into disfavor with the regime or actively opposing it (for example Helmut Hatzfeld, who fled from Germany, and Werner Krauss (not to be confused with the actor of the same name), who lost his academic position in 1935).

Laboriously reconstructed after World War II, the Hispanic philology of the German-speaking countries contributed the works of Carolina Michaëlis de Vasconcellos and Ernst Robert Curtius. Also:

- Rudolph Grossmann produced a Spanish-German dictionary and an anthology of Spanish lyric poetry.
- Hans Juretschke contributed studies on Spanish Romanticism and on German culture in Spain.
- Werner Beinhauer wrote several books on colloquial Spanish.
- Torsten Rox studied Mariano José de Larra and the Spanish nineteenth-century media.
- Hans Magnus Enzensberger published a new translation of Federico García Lorca.

The Deutscher Hispanistenverband (German Association of Hispanists) was established in 1977 and since then has held a congress biennially. Currently in Germany, Spanish often surpasses French in number of students. About forty university departments of Romance philology exist in Germany, and there are more than ten thousand students of Spanish.

Today in Germany there are publishers specialized in Hispanic Studies, such as Edition Reichenberger, in Kassel, which is devoted to the Golden Age, and Klaus Dieter Vervuert's Iberoamericana Vervuert Verlag, which has branches in Frankfurt and Madrid and facilitates collaboration among Hispanists.

In Austria, Franz Grillparzer was the first scholar of Spanish and a reader of the theater of the Golden Age. Anton Rothbauer also distinguished himself, as a translator of modern lyric poetry and scholar of the Black Legend. Rudolf Palgen and Alfred Wolfgang Wurzbach (for example with his study of Lope de Vega) also contributed to Hispanism in Austria.

=== France and Belgium ===
Hispanism in France dates back to the powerful influence of Spanish Golden Age literature on authors such as Pierre Corneille and Paul Scarron. Spanish influence was also brought to France by Spanish Protestants who fled the Inquisition, many of whom took up teaching of the Spanish language. These included Juan de Luna, author of a sequel to Lazarillo de Tormes. N. Charpentier's Parfaicte méthode pour entendre, écrire et parler la langue espagnole (Paris: Lucas Breyel, 1597) was supplemented by the grammar of César Oudin (also from 1597) that served as a model to those that were later written in French. Michel de Montaigne read the chroniclers of the Spanish Conquest and had as one of his models Antonio de Guevara. Molière, Alain-René Lesage, and Jean-Pierre Claris de Florian borrowed plots and characters from Spanish literature.

French travelers to Spain in the 19th century who left written and artistic testimony include painters such as Eugène Delacroix and Henri Regnault; well-known authors such as Alexandre Dumas, Théophile Gautier, George Sand, Stendhal, Hippolyte Taine and Prosper Mérimée; and other writers, including Jean-François de Bourgoing, Jean Charles Davillier, Louis Viardot, Isidore Justin Séverin, Charles Didier, Alexandre de Laborde, Antoine de Latour, Joseph Bonaventure Laurens, Édouard Magnien, Pierre Louis de Crusy and Antoine Frédéric Ozanam.

Victor Hugo was in Spain accompanying his father in 1811 and 1813. He was proud to call himself a "grandee of Spain", and he knew the language well. In his works there are numerous allusions to El Cid and the works of Miguel de Cervantes.

Prosper Mérimée, even before his repeated trips to Spain, had shaped his intuitive vision of the country in his Théatre de Clara Gazul (1825) and in La Famille de Carvajal (1828). Mérimée made many trips between 1830 and 1846, making numerous friends, among them the Duke of Rivas and Antonio Alcalá Galiano. He wrote Lettres addressées d'Espagne au directeur de la Revue de Paris, which are costumbrista sketches that feature the description of a bullfight. Mérimée's short novels Les âmes du purgatoire (1834) and Carmen (1845) are classic works on Spain.

Honoré de Balzac was a friend of Francisco Martínez de la Rosa and dedicated his novel El Verdugo (1829) to him. (And Martínez de la Rosa's play Abén Humeya was produced in Paris in 1831.)

The Spanish romancero is represented in the French Bibliothèque universelle des romans, which was published in 1774. Auguste Creuzé de Lesser published folk ballads about El Cid in 1814, comparing them (as Johann Gottfried Herder had done before him) with the Greek epic tradition, and these were reprinted in 1823 and 1836, providing much raw material to the French Romantic movement. The journalist and publisher Abel Hugo, brother of Victor Hugo, emphasized the literary value of the romancero, translating and publishing a collection of romances and a history of King Rodrigo in 1821, and Romances historiques traduits de l'espagnol in 1822. He also composed a stage review, Les français en Espagne (1823), inspired by the time he spent with his brother at the Seminario de Nobles in Madrid during the reign of Joseph Bonaparte.

Madame de Stäel contributed to the knowledge of Spanish Literature in France (as she did also for German literature), which helped introduce Romanticism to the country. To this end she translated volume IV of Friedrich Bouterwek's Geschichte der Poesie und Beredsamkeit seit dem Ende des dreizehnten Jahrhunderts in 1812 and gave it the title of Histoire de la littérature espagnole.

Spanish literature was also promoted to readers of French by the Swiss author Simonde de Sismondi with his study De la littérature du midi de l'Europe (1813).

Also important for French access to Spanish poetry was the two-volume Espagne poétique (1826–27), an anthology of post-15th-century Castilian poetry translated by Juan María Maury. In Paris, the publishing house Baudry published many works by Spanish Romantics and even maintained a collection of "best" Spanish authors, edited by Eugenio de Ochoa.

Images of Spain were offered by the travel books of Madame d'Aulnoy and Saint-Simon, as well as the poet Théophile Gautier, who travelled in Spain in 1840 and published Voyage en Espagne (1845) and Espagne (1845). These works are so full of color and the sense of the picturesque that they even served as inspirations to Spanish writers themselves (poets such as José Zorrilla and narrators such as those of the Generation of '98), as well as to Alexandre Dumas, who attended the production of Zorrilla's Don Juan Tenorio in Madrid. Dumas wrote his somewhat negative views of his experience in his Impressions de voyage (1847–1848). In his play Don Juan de Marana, Dumas revived the legend of Don Juan, changing the ending after having seen Zorrilla's version in the edition of 1864.

François-René de Chateaubriand traveled through Iberia in 1807 on his return trip from Jerusalem, and later took part in the French intervention in Spain in 1823, which he describes in his Mémoires d'Outre-tombe (1849–1850). It may have been at that time that he began to write Les aventures du dernier Abencerraje (1826), which exalted Hispano-Arabic chivalry. Another work that was widely read was the Lettres d'un espagnol (1826), by Louis Viardot, who visited Spain in 1823.

Stendhal included a chapter "De l'Espagne" in his essay De l'amour (1822). Later (1834) he visited the country.

George Sand spent the winter of 1837–1838 with Chopin in Majorca, installed in the Valldemossa Charterhouse. Their impressions are captured in Sand's Un hiver au midi de l'Europe (1842) and in Chopin's Memoirs.

Spanish classical painting exerted a strong influence on Manet, and more recently, painters such as Picasso and Dalí have influenced modern painting generally.

Spanish music has influenced composers such as Georges Bizet, Emmanuel Chabrier, Édouard Lalo, Maurice Ravel, and Claude Debussy.

At present the most important centers for Hispanism in France are at the Universities of Bordeaux and Toulouse, and in Paris, with the Institut des Études Hispaniques, founded in 1912. Journals include Bulletin Hispanique.

Prominent Hispanists in Belgium include Pierre Groult and Lucien-Paul Thomas. Groult studied Castilian mysticism in relation to its Flemish counterpart. A Comprehensive Spanish Grammar (1995)—an English translation of the original Dutch Spaanse Spraakkunst (1979)—was written by Jacques de Bruyne, a professor at Ghent University.

=== United States and Canada ===
Hispanism in the United States has a long tradition and is highly developed. To a certain extent this is a result of the United States's own history, which is tied closely to the Spanish empire and its former colonies, especially Mexico, Puerto Rico, the Philippines, and Cuba. Historically, many Americans have romanticized the Spanish legacy and given a privileged position to the Castilian language and culture, while simultaneously downplaying or rejecting the Latin American and Caribbean dialects and cultures of the Spanish-speaking areas of U.S. influence. There are now more than thirty-five million Spanish-speakers in the United States, making Spanish the second most spoken language in the country and Latinos the largest national minority. Spanish is used actively in some of the most populous states, including California, Florida, New Mexico, and Texas, and in large cities such as New York, Los Angeles, Miami, San Antonio and San Francisco. The American Association of Teachers of Spanish was founded in 1917 and holds a biennial congress outside the United States; Hispania is the association's official publication. (Since 1944, it is the American Association of Teachers of Spanish and Portuguese.) The North American Academy of the Spanish Language brings together Spanish speakers in North America.

The first academic professorships of Spanish at United States universities were established at Harvard (1819), Virginia (1825), and Yale (1826). The U.S. consul in Valencia, Obadiah Rich, imported numerous books and valuable manuscripts that became the Obadiah Rich Collection at the New York Public Library, and numerous magazines, especially the North American Review, published translations. Many travelers published their impressions on Spain, such as Alexander Slidell Mackenzie ( A Year in Spain [1836] and Spain Revisited [1836]). These were read by Washington Irving, Edgar Allan Poe, and other travelers like the Sephardic journalist Mordecai M. Noah and the diplomat Caleb Cushing and his wife. Poe studied Spanish at the University of Virginia and some of his stories have Spanish settings. He also wrote scholarly articles on Spanish literature.

The beginnings of Hispanism itself are found in the works of Washington Irving, who met Leandro Fernández de Moratín in Bordeaux in 1825 and was in Spain in 1826 (when he frequented the social gatherings of another American, Sarah Maria Theresa McKean (1780–1841), the marquise widow of Casa Irujo), as well as in 1829. He went on to become ambassador between 1842 and 1846. Irving studied in Spanish libraries and met Martín Fernández de Navarrete in Madrid, using one of the latter's works as a source for his A History of the Life and Voyages of Christopher Columbus (1828), and made friends and corresponded with Cecilia Böhl de Faber, from where a mutual influence was born. His Romantic interest in Arab topics shaped his A Chronicle of the Conquest of Granada (1829) and Alhambra (1832). McKean's social gatherings were also attended by the children of the Bostonian of Irish origin John Montgomery, who was the consul of the United States in Alicante, and particularly by the Spanish-born writer George Washington Montgomery.

Henry Wadsworth Longfellow's translations of Spanish classics also form part of the history of North American Hispanism; he went through Madrid in 1829 expressing his impressions in his letters, a diary and in Outre-Mer (1833–1834). A good connoisseur of the classics, Longfellow translated Jorge Manrique's couplets. In order to fulfill his duties as a Spanish professor, he composed his Spanish Novels (1830), which are story adaptations of Irving and published several essays on Spanish literature and a drama, including The Spanish Student (1842), where he imitates those of the Spanish Golden Age. In his anthology The Poets and Poetry of Europe (1845) he includes the works of many Spanish poets. William Cullen Bryant translated Morisco romances and composed the poems "The Spanish Revolution" (1808) and "Cervantes" (1878). He was linked in New York to Spaniards and, as director of the Evening Post, included many articles on Iberian subjects in the magazine. He was in Spain in 1847, and narrated his impressions in Letters of a traveller (1850–1857). In Madrid he met Carolina Coronado, translating into English her poem "The Lost Bird" and novel Jarilla, both of which were published in the Evening Post. But the most important group of Spanish scholars was one from Boston. The work of George Ticknor, a professor of Spanish at Harvard who wrote History of Spanish Literature, and William H. Prescott, who wrote historical works on the conquest of America, are without doubt contributions of the first order. Ticknor was a friend of Pascual de Gayangos y Arce, whom he met in London, and visited Spain in 1818, describing his impressions in Life, letters and journals (1876). In spite of significant difficulties with his vision, Prescott composed histories of the conquest of Mexico and Peru, as well as a history of the reign of the Catholic Monarchs.

In the United States there are important societies that are dedicated to the study, conservation and spread of Spanish culture, of which the Hispanic Society of America is the best known. There are also libraries specialized in Hispanic matter, including ones at Tulane University, New Orleans. Important journals include Hispanic Review, Revista de las Españas, Nueva Revista de Filología Hispánica, Hispania, Dieciocho, Revista Hispánica Moderna and Cervantes.

=== Russia ===
The history of Hispanism in Russia—before, during, and after the Soviet period—is long and deep, and it even survived the rupture of relations between Russia and Spain caused by the Spanish Civil War. This history started in the 18th century, and in the 19th century the influence of Miguel de Cervantes on realist novelists (such as Dostoyevsky, Turgenev, and Tolstoy) was profound.

Romantic travellers, such as Sergei Sobolevski, accumulated great libraries of books in Spanish and helped Spanish writers who visited Russia, such as Juan Valera. The Russian realist dramatist Alexander Ostrovsky translated the theater of Calderón and wrote texts on Spanish Golden Age theater. Yevgeni Salias de Tournemir visited Spain and published Apuntes de viaje por España (1874), shortly before Emilio Castelar published his La Rusia contemporánea (1881).

The Russian Association of Hispanists, founded in 1994, is currently supported by the Russian Academy of Sciences. The field of Spanish-American studies has undergone a great increase recently. A survey in 2003 revealed that there are at least four thousand students of Spanish in Russian universities.

Twentieth-century Spanish scholars include Sergei Goncharenko (mentor of a whole generation of Spanish scholars), Victor Andreyev, Vladimir Vasiliev, Natalia Miod, Svetlana Piskunova, and Vsevolod Bagno (El Quijote vivido por los rusos). Recently, a Russian Hernandian Circle was founded, devoted to studying the work of Miguel Hernández, who visited the USSR in September 1937.

=== Poland ===
Records of visits to Spain by Poles begin in the Middle Ages, with pilgrimages to Santiago de Compostela. According to one estimate, more than 100 Poles made the pilgrimage during that era.

In the 16th century, the humanist Jan Dantyszek (1485–1548), ambassador of King Sigismund I the Old to Charles V, Holy Roman Emperor, traveled to the Iberian Peninsula three times and remained there for nearly ten years, becoming friends with outstanding figures such as Hernán Cortés and leaving letters of his travels. The bishop Piotr Dunin-Wolski took 300 Spanish books to Poland, and these were added to the Jagiellonian Library of Kraków under the name of Bibliotheca Volsciana. Several professors from Spain worked in the Academy of Kraków (today known as the Jagiellonian University), including the Sevillian Garsías Cuadras and the Aragonese jurist Pedro Ruiz de Moros (1506–1571), known in Poland as Roizjusz, who mainly wrote in Latin and was adviser to the king. The Society of Jesus was active in Poland, promoting not only Spanish ideas of theology, but also Spanish theater, which they considered a teaching tool. In the 16th century, the travelers Stanisław Łaski, Andrzej Tęczyński, Jan Tarnowski, Stanisław Radziwiłł, and Szymon Babiogórski visited Spain, among others. An anonymous traveler who arrived in Barcelona in August 1595 left an account of his impressions in a manuscript called Diariusz z peregrynacji włoskiej, hiszpańskiej, portugalskiej (Diary of the Italian, Spanish and Portuguese Pilgrimages).

In the 17th century, the Polish nobleman Jakub Sobieski made the pilgrimage to Santiago de Compostela and wrote an account of his journey. In the years 1674–1675, Canon Andrzej Chryzostom Załuski, Jerzy Radziwiłł, and Stanisław Radziwiłł visited Spain, and all left written testimony of their travels.

Modern Polish Hispanic Studies begin with the Romantic poet Adam Mickiewicz. He was followed in the 19th century by Joachim Lelewel, Wojciech Dzieduszycki, Leonard Rettel, and Julian Adolf Swiecicki. Karol Dembowski wrote, in French, a book on his travels in Spain and Portugal during First Carlist War.

Felix Rozanski, Edward Porebowicz and Zygmunt Czerny were enthusiastic translators who taught in Poland at that time. Maria Strzałkowa wrote the first outline of history of Spanish literature in Polish. Other important translators include Kazimierz Zawanowski, Zofia Szleyen, Kalina Wojciechowska, and Zofia Chądzyńska.

The poet and Hispanist Florian Śmieja taught Spanish and Spanish American literature in London, Ontario. In 1971 the first professorship of Hispanic Studies not subordinate to a department of Romance literature was created at the University of Warsaw, and in the following year a degree program in Hispanic Studies was instituted there. Today it is called the Institute of Iberian and Latin American Studies. Those who have taught in it include Urszula Aszyk-Bangs, M.-Pierrette Malcuzynski (1948–2004), Robert Mansberger Amorós, Víctor Manuel Ferreras, and Carlos Marrodán Casas. In Kraków the first National Symposium of Spanish Scholars was held in 1985. The historians Janusz Tazbir and Jan Kienewicz wrote on Spanish themes, as did the literary scholars Gabriela Makowiecka, Henryk Ziomek, Beata Baczynska, Florian Śmieja, Piotr Sawicki, and Kazimierz Sabik. Grzegorz Bak studied the image of Spain in 19th-century Polish literature.

=== Brazil ===
The integration of Brazil into Mercosur in 1991 created a need for closer relations between Brazil and the Hispanic world, as well as better knowledge of the Spanish language within Brazil. For this reason, Brazil has promoted the inclusion of Spanish in the country's education system. A large core of Spanish scholars formed at the University of São Paulo, including Fidelino de Figueiredo, Luis Sánchez y Fernández, and José Lodeiro. The year 1991 also marks the creation of the Anuario Brasileño de Estudios Hispánicos, whose Suplemento: El hispanismo en Brasil traces the history of Hispanic Studies in the country. In 2000 the first Congresso Brasileiro de Hispanistas took place, and its proceedings were published under the title Hispanismo 2000. At that meeting, the Associação Brasileira de Hispanistas was established. The organization's second congress took place in 2002, and since then it has been held every two years.

=== Portugal ===
Compared to Brazil, Portugal has shown less interest in Hispanism; it was not until 2005 that a national association for it was founded. Portuguese activities in this field are mostly of a comparatist nature and focus on Luso-Spanish topics, partly because of academic and administrative reasons. The journal Península is one of the most important Hispanist journals in the country. Portuguese Hispanism appears somewhat limited, and to an extent there is a mutual distrust between the two cultures, motivated by a history of conflicts and rivalry. Nevertheless, Portuguese writers of the Renaissance—such as the dramatist Gil Vicente, Jorge de Montemayor, Francisco Sá de Miranda, and the historian Francisco Manuel de Mello—wrote in both Spanish and Portuguese.

=== Italy ===
The cultural relationship between Spain and Italy developed early in the Middle Ages, especially centered in Naples through the relation that it had with the Crown of Aragon and Sicily, and intensified during the Spanish Pre-Renaissance and Renaissance through Castile. Garcilaso de la Vega engaged members of the Accademia Pontaniana and introduced the Petrarchian metrical style and themes to Spanish lyric poetry. This close relation extended throughout the periods of Mannerism and the Baroque in the 16th and 17th centuries. In the 18th century the poet Giambattista Conti (1741–1820) was perhaps the foremost Spanish scholar, translator and anthologist of Europe. Dramatist, critic, and theater historiographer Pietro Napoli Signorelli (1731–1815) defended Spanish literature against critics such as Girolamo Tiraboschi and Saverio Bettinelli, who accused it of "bad taste", "corruption", and "barbarism". Giacomo Casanova and Giuseppe Baretti traveled throughout Spain, leaving interesting descriptions of their experiences: Baretti was fluent in Spanish. The critic Guido Bellico was in the Reales Estudios de San Isidro with the eminent Arabist Mariano Pizzi. Among other prominent Italian Hispanists were Leonardo Capitanacci, Ignazio Gajone, Placido Bordoni, Giacinto Ceruti, Francesco Pesaro, Giuseppe Olivieri, Giovanni Querini and Marco Zeno.

In the 19th century, Italian Romanticism took great interest in the Spanish romancero, with translations by Giovanni Berchet in 1837 and Pietro Monti in 1855. Edmondo de Amicis traveled throughout Spain and wrote a book of his impressions. Antonio Restori (1859–1928), a professor at the Universities of Messina and of Genoa, published some works of Lope de Vega and dedicated his Saggi di bibliografia teatrale spagnuola (1927) to the bibliography of the Spanish theater; he also wrote Il Cid, studio storico-critico (1881) and Le gesta del Cid (1890). Bernardo Sanvisenti, a professor of Spanish language and literature at the University of Milan, wrote Manuale di letteratura spagnuola (1907), as well as a study (1902) on the influence of Boccaccio, Dante and Petrarch in Spanish literature.

Italian Hispanism arose from three sources, already identifiable in the 19th century. The first of these was the Spanish hegemonic presence in the Italian peninsula, which sparked interest in the study of Spain and in the creation of works about Spain. Secondly, Italian Hispanism was encouraged by a comparatist approach, and in fact the first Italian studies on literature in Spanish were of a comparative nature, such as Benedetto Croce's La Spagna nella vita italiana durante la Rinascenza (1907) and the works of Arturo Farinelli and Bernardino Sanvisenti, which were dedicated to the relationships between Spain and Italy, Italy and Germany, and Spain and Germany. Thirdly, the development of Italian Hispanism was supported by Romance philology, especially through the works of Mario Casella (author of Cervantes: Il Chisciotte [1938]), Ezio Levi, Salvatore Battaglia, and Giovanni Maria Bertini (translator of Spanish modern poetry, especially the poems of Lorca). Cesare de Lollis also made important contributions to Cervantes studies.

The field of modern Hispanic Studies originated in 1945, with the trio of Oreste Macrì (editor of works of Antonio Machado and of Fray Luis de León), Guido Mancini, and Franco Meregalli. Eventually Spanish-American studies emerged as an area of independent of the literature of Spain. Between 1960 and 1970 the first professorships of Spanish-American language and literature were created, pioneered by Giovanni Meo Zilio, who occupied the first chair of that sort created at the University of Florence in 1968. He was followed by Giuseppe Bellini (historian of Spanish-American literature, translator of Pablo Neruda, and student of Miguel Ángel Asturias); Roberto Paoli (Peruvianist and translator of César Vallejo); and Dario Puccini (student of the lyric poetry of Sor Juana Inés de la Cruz, as well as that of the 20th century).

The Association of Italian Hispanists (AISPI) was created in May 1973 and has held numerous congresses almost annually since then. Italian Hispanists include Silvio Pellegrini, Pio Rajna, Antonio Viscardi, Luigi Sorrento, Guido Tammi, Francesco Vian, Juana Granados de Bagnasco, Gabriele Ranzato, Lucio Ambruzzi, Eugenio Mele, Manlio Castello, Francesco Ugolini, Lorenzo Giussi, Elena Milazzo, Luigi de Filippo, Carmelo Samonà, Giuseppe Carlo Rossi, the poets Giuseppe Ungaretti (who translated Góngora) and Pier Paolo Pasolini, Margherita Morreale, Giovanni Maria Bertini, Giuliano Bonfante, Carlo Bo (who worked with the poetry of Juan Ramón Jiménez), Ermanno Caldera, Rinaldo Froldi, and Guido Mancini (author of a Storia della letteratura spagnola.

=== Israel ===
At the time of its founding in 1948, the modern state of Israel already included a substantial Spanish-speaking community. Their language, Judeo-Spanish, was derived from Old Spanish along a path of development that diverged from that of the Spanish of Spain and its empire, beginning in 1492, when the Jews were expelled from Spain. Between the 16th and 20th centuries many of them lived in the old Ottoman Empire and North Africa. There are some 100,000 speakers of Judeo-Spanish in Israel today.

At present there are several Israeli media outlets in (standard Castilian) Spanish, some of which have a long history. The newsweekly Aurora, for example, was founded in the late 1960s, and today it also has an online edition. Israel has at least three radio stations that broadcast in Spanish.

Modern Israeli Hispanists include Samuel Miklos Stern (the discoverer of the Spanish kharjas and a student of the Spanish Inquisition), professor Benzion Netanyahu, and Haim Beinart. Other Israeli scholars have studied the literature and history of Spain, frequently influenced by the theses of Américo Castro. Don Quixote has been translated into Hebrew twice, first by Natan Bistritzky and Nahman Bialik (Jerusalem, Sifriat Poalim, 1958), and later (Tel Aviv: Hakibutz Hameuchad, 1994) by Beatriz Skroisky-Landau and Luis Landau, the latter a professor in the Department of Hebrew Literature at Ben-Gurion University of the Negev and author of Cervantes and the Jews (Beer Sheva: Ben-Gurion University Press, 2002). The historian Yosef Kaplan has written numerous works and has translated Isaac Cardoso's Las excelencias y calumnias de los hebreos into Hebrew. The Asociación de Hispanistas de Israel was created on 21 June 2007 at the Instituto Cervantes de Tel Aviv, consisting of over thirty professors, researchers and intellectuals linked to the languages, literatures, history and cultures of Spain, Portugal, Latin America and the Judeo-Spanish Sephardic world. Its first meeting was convened by professors Ruth Fine (Hebrew University of Jerusalem), who was appointed the first president of the association; Raanán Rein (Tel Aviv University); Aviva Dorón (University of Haifa); and Tamar Alexander (Ben-Gurion University of the Negev).

=== Arab world ===
Spain's links with the Arab world began in the Middle Ages with the Moorish conquest of the Iberian Peninsula. Arabic-speaking Moorish kingdoms were present in Spain until 1492, when the Reconquista defeated the Emirate of Granada. Many Moors remained in Spain until their final expulsion in 1609. The Spanish Empire, at its height, included a number of Arabic-speaking enclaves in the Maghreb, such as Spanish Sahara and Spanish Morocco.

The Moroccan historian Ahmed Mohammed al-Maqqari (c. 1591 – 1632) wrote about the Muslim dynasties in Spain. The Egyptian poet Ahmed Shawqi (1869–1932) spent six years of exile in Andalusia. Perhaps the first "scientific" Arab Hispanist was the Lebanese writer Shakib Arslan (1869–1946), who wrote a book about his trips to Spain in three volumes. The Egyptian writer Taha Husayn (1889–1973) promoted the renewal of relations with Spain, among other European countries of the Mediterranean, and led the creation of an edition of the great 12th-century Andalusian literary encyclopedia Al-Dakhira, of Ibn Bassam. Other important figures were 'Abd al-'Aziz al-Ahwani, 'Abd Allah 'Inan, Husayn Mu'nis, Salih al-Astar, Mahmud Mekki, and Hamid Abu Ahmad. Linked to the Egyptian Institute of Madrid are Ahmad Mukhtar al-'Abbadi (who specialized in the history of Moorish Granada), Ahmad Haykal, Salah Fadl, As'ad Sharif 'Umar, and Nagwa Gamal Mehrez. The Asociación de Hispanistas de Egipto was formed in 1968. The First Colloquium of Arab Hispanism took place in Madrid in 1975.

=== Netherlands ===
In spite of a bitter war between Spain and the United Provinces in the late 16th century, Hispanism has deep roots in the Netherlands. The influence of Spanish Golden Age literature can be seen in the work of the Dutch poet and playwright Gerbrand Bredero and in the translations of Guilliam de Bay in the 17th century. Nineteenth-century Romanticism aroused Dutch curiosity about the exoticism of things Spanish. The Arabist Reinhart Dozy (1820–1883) made important contributions to the study of the Moorish domination in Spain, including Histoire des Musulmans d'Espagne (1861) and the continuation Recherches sur l'Histoire et littérature de l'Espagne, which was published in its definitive form in 1881. A few years later, the Dutch scholar Fonger de Haan (1859–1930) held the chair of Spanish literature at Boston University. Two of his publications, Pícaros y ganapanes (1899) and An Outline of the History of the Novela Picaresca in Spain (1903) still serve as starting points for research today. In 1918 he tried in vain to spark the interest of the State University of Groningen in Hispanic Studies, but nevertheless donated his library of Hispanic Studies to it a few years later.

Serious studies of literature gained new impetus thanks to the work of Jan te Winkel of the University of Amsterdam who, with his seven-volume De Ontwikkelingsgang der Nederlandsche Letterkunde (1908–1921), drew attention to the influence that Spanish literature exerted on Dutch literature in the 17th century. Other researchers, such as William Davids (1918), Joseph Vles (1926) and Simon Vosters (1955), continued in the same direction as te Winkel. Two Romanists who were of great importance to Dutch Hispanism were Salverda de Grave and Sneyders de Vogel. Jean Jacques Salverda de Grave (1863–1947) became a professor of Romance philology at the University of Groningen in 1907, and he was succeeded by Kornelis Sneyders de Vogel (1876–1958) in 1921. In 1906, for the first time since 1659, a Spanish/Dutch dictionary was published, followed in 1912 by a Dutch/Spanish dictionary, both composed by A. A. Fokker. Since then many such dictionaries have been published, including one by C. F. A. van Dam and H. C. Barrau and another by S. A. Vosters. Many Spanish grammars in Dutch also have been published, including a grammar by Gerardus Johannes Geers (1924), one by Jonas Andries van Praag (1957) and one by Jos Hallebeek, Antoon van Bommel, and Kees van Esch (2004). Doctor W. J. van Baalen was an important popularizer of the history, customs, and wealth of Spanish America, producing ten books in those areas. Along with C. F. A. Van Dam, he founded the Nederlandsch Zuid-Amerikaansch Instituut in order to promote commercial and cultural contact between both worlds. The Groningen poet Hendrik de Vries (1896–1989) travelled twelve times to Spain between 1924 and 1936 and—although his father, an eminent philologist and polyglot, always refused to study Spanish because of the Eighty Years' War—the poet dedicated his book of poems Iberia (1964) to Spain.

In the Netherlands, the Institute of Hispanic Studies at the University of Utrecht was founded in 1951 by Cornelis Frans Adolf van Dam (who was a student of Ramón Menéndez Pidal) and has since been an important center for Spanish scholars. The Mexican Training Center at the University of Groningen was established in 1993.

Johan Brouwer, who wrote his thesis on Spanish mysticism, produced twenty-two books on Spanish subjects, as well as numerous translations. Jonas Andries van Prague, a professor at Groningen, studied Spanish Golden Age theater in the Netherlands and the Generation of '98, as well as the Sephardic refugee writers in the Netherlands. Cees Nooteboom has written books about travel to Spain, including Roads to Santiago. Barber van de Pol produced a Dutch translation of Don Quixote in 1994, and Hispanism continues to be promoted by Dutch writers such as Rik Zaal (Alles over Spanje), Gerrit Jan Zwier, Arjen Duinker, Jean Pierre Rawie, Els Pelgrom ( The Acorn Eaters), Chris van der Heijden (The Splendour of Spain from Cervantes to Velázquez), "Albert Helman", Maarten Steenmeijer, and Jean Arnoldus Schalekamp (This is Majorca: The Balearic Islands Minorca, Ibiza, Formentera).

=== Scandinavia ===
==== Denmark ====
Miguel de Cervantes had an impact in Denmark, where his Don Quixote was translated into Danish (1776–1777) by Charlotte Dorothea Biehl, who also translated his Novelas ejemplares (1780–1781). Hans Christian Andersen made a trip to Spain and kept a diary about his experiences. Other prominent Danish Hispanists include Knud Togeby; Carl Bratli (Spansk-dansk Ordbog [Spanish/Danish dictionary], 1947); Johann Ludwig Heiberg (1791–1860, Calderón studies); Kristoffer Nyrop (1858–1931, Spansk grammatik); and Valdemar Beadle (Middle Ages and the Spanish and Italian Baroque).

==== Sweden ====
In Sweden, prominent Hispanists include Erik Staaf; Edvard Lidforss (translator of Don Quixote into Swedish); Gunnar Tilander (publisher of medieval Spanish fueros); Alf Lombard; Karl Michaëlson; Emanuel Walberg; Bertil Maler (who edited Tratado de las enfermedades de las aves de caza); Magnus Mörner; Bengt Hasselrot; and Nils Hedberg. Inger Enkvist researched Latin American novels and Juan Goytisolo. Mateo López Pastor, author of Modern spansk litteratur (1960), taught and published in Sweden.

==== Norway ====
Hispanism was founded in Norway by professor Magnus Gronvold, who translated Don Quixote into Norwegian in collaboration with Nils Kjær. Leif Sletsjoe (author of Sancho Panza, hombre de bien) and Kurt E. Sparre (a Calderón scholar) were both professors at the University of Oslo. Currently there is a strong and renewed interest in Hispanism among Norwegian youth, and the 21st century has seen the publication of at least three Spanish grammars for Norwegians—one by Cathrine Grimseid (2005); another by Johan Falk, Luis Lerate, and Kerstin Sjölin (2008); and one by Ana Beatriz Chiquito (2008). There is an Association of Norwegian Hispanism, a National Association of Professors of Spanish, and several journals, including La Corriente del Golfo (Revista Noruega de Estudios Latinoamericanos, Tribune, and Romansk forum.

==== Finland ====
In Finland, at the beginning of the 20th century there was an important group of Hispanists in Helsinki, including Oiva J. Tallgren (1878–1941; he adopted the surname Tuulio in 1933); his wife Tyyni Tuulio (1892–1991); Eero K. Neuvonen (1904–1981), who studied Arabisms in Old Spanish; and Sinikka Kallio-Visapää (translator of Ortega y Gasset).

=== Romania ===
In Romania, the initiator of Hispanism was Ștefan Vârgolici, who translated a great part of the early 17th-century Miguel de Cervantes novel Don Quixote into Romanian and published—under the title Studies on Spanish Literature (Jasi, 1868–1870)—works on Calderón, Cervantes, and Lope de Vega, which had appeared in the journal Convorbiri literare (Literary Conversations). Alexandru Popescu-Telega (1889–1970) wrote a book on Unamuno (1924), a comparison between Romanian and Spanish folklore (1927), a biography of Cervantes (1944), a translation from the romancero (1947), a book on Hispanic Studies in Romania (1964), and an anthology in Romanian. Ileana Georgescu, George Călinescu (Iscusitul hidalgo Don Quijote de la Mancha), and Tudor Vianu (Cervantes) have published books on Cervantes.

=== Asia and the Pacific ===
There is an Asian Association of Spanish Scholars (Asociación Asiática de Hispanistas ), which was founded in 1985 and meets every three years.

==== Former East Indies ====
Hispanism in Asia and the Pacific is mostly related to the literature and languages of the Spanish/Novohispanic administration’s legacy in the Philippines, Mariana Islands, Guam and Palau, where Spanish has a history as a colonial language. In 1900, less than a million Filipinos spoke Spanish; estimates of the number of Filipinos whose first language is Spanish today vary widely, ranging from 2,660 to 400,000. Spanish remains perceivable in some creole languages, such as Chabacano. In Manila, the Instituto Cervantes has given Spanish classes for years, and the Philippine Academy of the Spanish Language is involved in the teaching and standard use of Spanish in the Philippines. But there is no institution or association that brings together and defends the interests of Hispanicity. The most important Spanish scholars—aside from the national hero, poet and novelist José Rizal (who wrote in Spanish)—are Antonio M. Molina (not the composer Antonio J. Molina), José María Castañer, Edmundo Farolan, Guillermo Gómez, Miguel Fernández Passion, Alfonso Felix, and Lourdes Castrillo de Brillantes. The weekly Nueva Era, edited by Guillermo Gómez Rivera, is the only newspaper in Spanish still published in the Philippines, although the quarterly journal Revista Filipina, edited by Edmundo Farolán, also exists, in print and online.

==== Japan ====
The first Japanese institution to offer Spanish language classes, in 1897, was the Language School of Tokyo, known today as the Tokyo University of Foreign Studies. There, Gonzalo Jiménez de la Espada mentored the first Japanese Hispanists, including Hirosada Nagata (1885–1973, now considered a "patriarch" of Hispanism in Japan) and Shizuo Kasai. Meanwhile, the Osaka University of Foreign Studies established Hispanic Studies in its curriculum in 1921, but most university Hispanic Studies departments were founded in the 1970s and '80s. Translations of Don Quixote into Japanese are at first incomplete and by way of an English version (e.g. one by Shujiro Watanabe in 1887, and others in 1893, 1901, 1902, and 1914). Japanese versions of Don Quixote in its entirety—although still based on an English translation—were published in 1915 (by Hogetsu Shimamura and Noburu Katakami) and in 1927–28 (by Morita). In 1948, Hirosada Nagata published a nearly-complete direct (from the Spanish) Japanese translation. It fell to Nagata's student, Masatake Takahashi (1908–1984), to complete that translation (published in 1977). Meanwhile, an entire, direct Japanese translation of Don Quixote was also produced (the two parts in 1958 and 1962) by Yu Aida (1903–1971).

The Asociación Japonesa de Hispanistas was founded in Tokyo in 1955, consisting mostly of university professors. The association publishes the journal Hispánica. The journal Lingüística Hispánica is published by the Círculo de Lingüística Hispánica de Kansai.

Japanese Hispanism was surveyed by Ryohei Uritani in the article "Historia del hispanismo en el Japón", which was published in the journal Español actual: Revista de español vivo (48 [1987], 69–92).

==== Korea ====
The relations between Spain and Korea began with Gregorio Céspedes in the 16th century, who was studied by Chul Park. Spanish education in Korea has continued for the past fifty years, and there is currently a strong demand for it. Since 2001, Spanish has been an optional language in secondary education. The Asociación Coreana de Hispanistas was founded in 1981 and holds two annual congresses, one in June and another in December. It also publishes the journal Hispanic Studies.

== Associations of Hispanists ==
The Spanish-language portal run by the Instituto Cervantes lists over 60 associations of Hispanists around the world, including the following:

- Asociación Hispánica de Literatura Medieval (Hispanic Association of Medieval Literature)
- Asociación Internacional de Hispanistas (International Association of Hispanists)
- Association of Hispanists of Great Britain and Ireland (AHGBI)
- Women in Spanish, Portuguese, and Latin-American Studies (WiSPS)
- Asociación de Hispanismo Filosófico (AHF) (Philosophical Hispanism Association)
- Asociación Canadiense de Hispanistas (ACH) (Canadian Association of Hispanists)

== Leading Hispanists ==
- Ida Altman (born 1950)
- Gerald Brenan (1894–1987)
- Raymond Carr (1919–2005)
- Alan Deyermond (1932–2009)
- J.H. Elliott (born 1930)
- Ian Gibson (born 1939)
- Guillermo Gómez (born 1936)
- Archer M. Huntington (1870–1955), founder of the Hispanic Society of America
- Gabriel Jackson (1921–2019)
- Juan López-Morillas (1913–1997), (Brown University)
- Angus Mackay (born 1939)
- Edward Malefakis (1932–2016)
- Erwin Kempton Mapes (1884–1961), (University of Iowa)
- Eric Woodfin Naylor (1936–2019), (University of the South)
- Geoffrey Parker (historian) (born 1943)
- Stanley G. Payne (born 1934)
- Edgar Allison Peers (1891–1952)
- Paul Preston (born 1946)
- John D. Rutherford (born 1941)
- Dorothy Severin (born 1942)
- Alison Sinclair
- Robert Southey (1774–1843)
- Walter Starkie (1894–1976)
- Hugh Thomas (1931–2017)
- George Ticknor (1791–1871)
- John Brande Trend (1887–1958)
- Leslie Walton (c.1894–1960)
- Earl Jefferson Hamilton (economic historian) (1899 – 7 May 1989)

== See also ==
- Instituto Cervantes
- Hispanist
- Hispagnolisme
- Hispania quarterly published by the American Association of Teachers of Spanish and Portuguese (AATSP).

== Bibliography ==
- Bak, Grzegorz (2002), La imagen de España en la literatura polaca del siglo XIX (PDF), Madrid: doctoral thesis, Universidad Complutense
- Quinziano, Franco (2003), "'Caro Soggiorno': Pietro Napoli Signorelli: Un hispanista en la España del XVIII", in González Martín, Vicente (ed.), La filología italiana ante el nuevo milenio, Universidad de Salamanca, pp. 551–574
- Serrano Vélez, Manuel (2005), Locos por el Quijote, Caja de Ahorros y Monte de Piedad de Zaragoza, Aragon y Rioja, ISBN 9788483241981
- Utray Sardá, Francisco (n.d.), Un enlace de culturas: Relaciones de España con los países árabes (PDF), archived from the original (PDF) on 26 March 2012
