= Leo Spitzer =

Austrian philologist

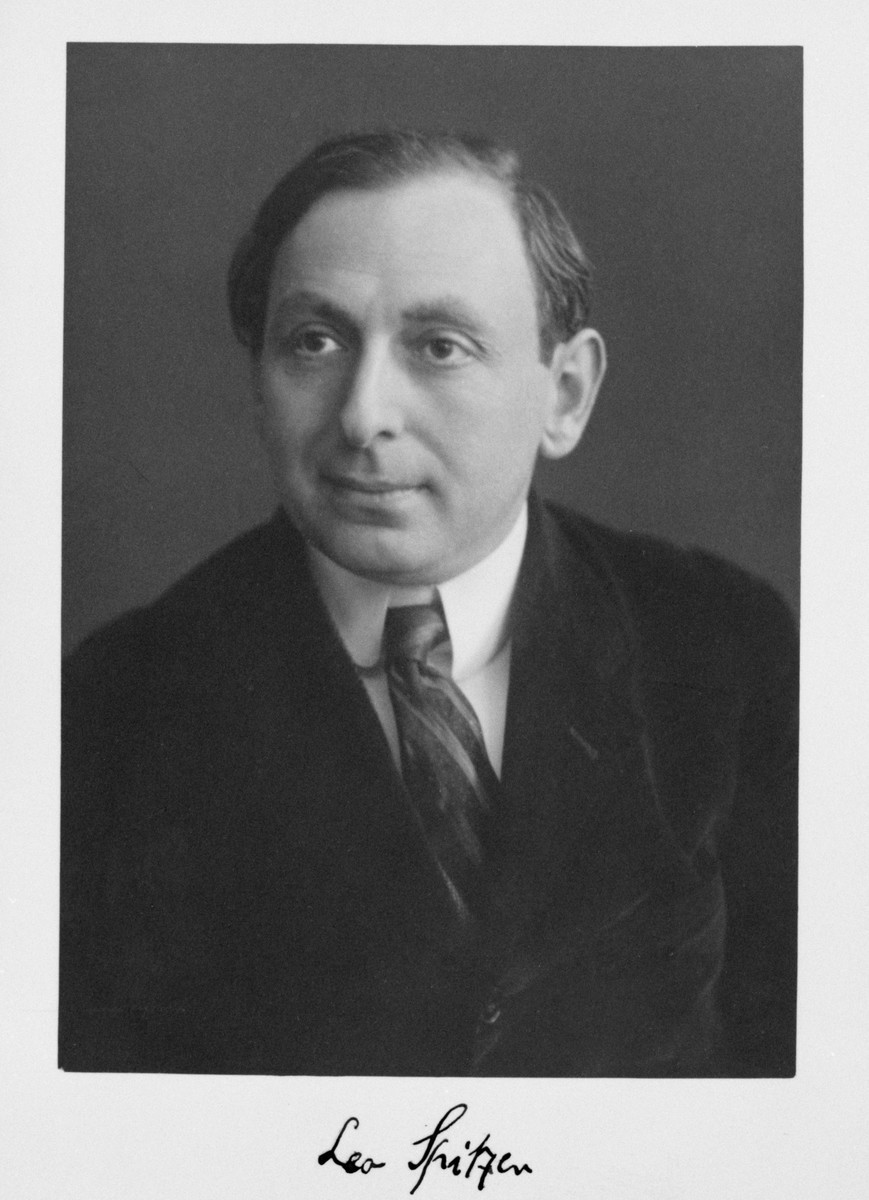
- Born: 7 February 1887; Wies, Melk, Austria-Hungary
- Died: 16 September 1960 (aged 73); Forte dei Marmi, Italy
- Occupations: Literary critic, philologist

Education
- Education: University of Jena

Philosophical work
- Institutions: University of Cologne; Istanbul University; Johns Hopkins University
- Notable students: Hans Marchand

Leo Spitzer (German: [ˈʃpɪtsɐ]; 7 February 1887 – 16 September 1960) was an Austrian Romanist and Hispanist, philologist, and an influential and prolific literary critic. He was known for his emphasis on stylistics. Along with Erich Auerbach, Spitzer is widely recognized as one of the foundational figures of comparative literature.

== Biography ==
Spitzer was a doctoral student of Wilhelm Meyer-Lübke, receiving his doctorate in 1910. He was a professor at the University of Marburg in 1925, at the University of Cologne in 1930. In 1933 he was dismissed because of his Jewish background and left Nazi Germany, moving to Istanbul; his position was taken up by literary scholar and philologist Ernst Robert Curtius. In Istanbul, Spitzer taught at the Istanbul University for three years "as the first professor of Latin languages" and "as director of the School of Foreign Languages." From there he went to Johns Hopkins University in 1936 (succeeding the chair in Romance philology left vacant with the death of David S. Blondheim in 1934), where he remained for the rest of his life.

== Legacy ==
According to René Wellek and Austin Warren:

Leo Spitzer early applied [parallelism of linguistic traits and content-elements] by investigating the recurrence of such motifs as blood and wounds in the writings of Henri Barbusse [...]. Later, Spitzer has tried to establish the connexion between recurrent stylistic traits and the psychology of the author, e.g. he connected the repetitive style of Péguy with his Bergsonism, and the style of Jules Romains with his Unanimism.

== Selected works ==
- Die Wortbildung als stilistisches Mittel exemplifiziert an Rabelais. Max Niemeyer, Halle 1910.
- Aufsätze zur romanischen Syntax und Stilistik. Max Niemeyer, Halle 1918.
- Fremdwörterhatz und Fremdvölkerhaß. Eine Streitschrift gegen die Sprachreinigung. Manzsche Hof-, Verlags- und Universitäts-Buchhandlung, Wien 1918.
- Studien zu Henri Barbusse. F. Cohen, Bonn 1920.
- Lexikalisches aus dem Katalanischen und den übrigen iberomanischen Sprachen. Leo S. Olschki, Genf 1921.
- Über die Ausbildung von Gegensinn in der Wortbildung. In: Ernst Gamillscheg and Leo Spitzer: Beiträge zur romanischen Wortbildungslehre. Leo S. Olschki, Genf 1921.
- Italienische Kriegsgefangenenbriefe. Materialien zu einer Charakteristik der volkstümlichen italienischen Korrespondenz. Peter Hanstein (edit.), Bonn 1921.
- Italienische Umgangssprache Kurt Schroeder, Bonn 1922.
- Stilstudien. Hueber, München 1928.
- Romanische Stil-und Literaturstudien. Elwer'sche Verlagsbuchhandlung, Marburg 1931.
- Der Stil Diderots (1948). In Jochen Schlobach (edit.): Denis Diderot. Wissenschaftliche Buchgesellschaft, Darmstadt 1992, ISBN 3-534-09097-7.
- Racine et Goethe. In: Revue d’histoire de la philosophie et d’histoire générale de la civilisation 1.1933: S.58-75.
- La enumeración caótica de la poesía moderna. Instituto de Filología, Buenos Aires 1945.
- Linguistics and Literary History. Princeton University Press, Princeton NJ 1948.
- Essays in historical semantics. New York : Russell & Russell, 1968 (originally published 1948).
- Essays on English and American Literature. Hrsg. von Anna Granville Hatcher. Princeton University Press, Princeton NJ 1962.
- Classical and Christian Ideas of World Harmony: Prolegomena to an Interpretation of the Word "Stimmung". Anna Granville Hatcher; mit einem Vorwort von René Wellek. Johns Hopkins University Press, Baltimore 1963.
- Interpretationen zur Geschichte der französischen Lyrik. Hrsg. von Helga Jauß-Meyer u. Peter Schunk. Selbstverlag des Romanischen Seminars der Universität Heidelberg 1961. (Aus Tonbandaufnahmen erstelltes Skriptum einer Gastvorlesung im Sommersemester 1958 an der Universität Heidelberg)
