= Hans-Ingo Radatz =

German philologist and linguist (born 1961)

- Born: 29 May 1961 (age 65); Celle, Lower Saxony, Germany

Academic background
- Education: University of Hannover

Academic work
- Discipline: Romance studies
- Institutions: University of Bamberg

Hans-Ingo Radatz (born 29 May 1961, Celle) is a German romance philologist and linguist, who teaches romance philology with key area in Hispanism at the University of Bamberg.

== Academic studies ==
Radatz finished high school in 1980 in the Gymnasium Garbsen and began to study Law in 1981 in the University of Hannover. In 1983 he switched to English Philology and Philosophy. In 1985 he went to study abroad in the Coleg Prifysgol Gogledd Cymru in Bangor, Wales, where he studied Welsh Sociolinguistics with professor Alan Thomas, transformational syntax with Professor Andrew Radford and Experimental Phonology and Phonetics with Professor Frank Gooding. In 1990 he began to study romance philology in the University of Frankfurt. On 21 November 1993, he finished the Master in Humanities, that allows to begin writing a thesis, with a translation and edition qinto German of poems of the Valencian poet Ausiàs March (1397–1459). This translation into German was published the same year with a prologue and a glossary written also by Radatz. In 1999, he earned his doctorate with a dissertation on sociolinguistics about the construction Adj-N (preceding attributive adjective) in romance languages.

== Professional career ==
From 1994 until 1998 he worked as a research assistant teacher in the Linguistics Professorship "Harro Stammerjohann" in the Chemnitz University of Technology, where he taught French linguistics.

After finishing his doctoral dissertation in 1999 he became post-doctorate researcher in the research group DFG in the University of Heidelberg, "Dynamics of subdialectal varieties" with a final work about the Catalan language in Mallorca. From 2001 until 2007 he held the position of research assistant in the lectureship of romance philology "Otto Gsell" in the Catholic University of Eichstätt-Ingolstadt. In 2008 his enablement to be university teacher of "romance linguistics" took place in the University of Vienna. His professorial dissertation was published in 2010 with the title Das Mallorquinische: gesprochenes Katalanisch auf Mallorca, deskriptive, typologische und soziolinguistische Aspekte" (Majorcan: spoken Catalan in Majorca. Descriptive, typological and sociolinguistic aspects).

After some substitutions in Aachen, Kiel and Heidelberg, he held a substitute position in 2009 in the Catalanistic lectureschip sponsored by the Ramon Llull Foundation in the University of Frankfurt. In 2010 this position was offered to him, but he renounced in favor of a W2 lectureship of "Romance linguistics with speciality in Hispanistics" in the University of Bamberg. Since 1 November 2010 he is full professor in the Otto-Friedrich University of Bamberg.

== Positions ==
Together with his academic position, he is also member of the advisory board of the Languages Center and member of the Center of Medieval Studies (Zentrum für Mittelalterstudien - ZEMAS) of this university. He is also vice-president of the También es vicepresidente de la Examination Committee for the Master's Program in General Linguistics. He is also co-director of the "International Institute for Iberic Studies".

== International Institute for Iberic Studies ==
The International Institute of Iberic Studies, which exists since 2015, under the direction of Hans-Ingo Radatz and Vicent Martines fosters the interchange at all levels between the University of Bamberg and the University of Alicante.

The aims of this institute are the multilingual and multimedia digitization of Europe's cultural, literary, and scientific heritage based on translations and multidisciplinary studies, as well as the dissemination of knowledge about the classical works of the Crown of Aragon and their relationship with other languages and cultures, and with other literatures. At a practical level it is achieved only through the support for international doctoral studies and the promotion of exchange programs for researchers from both universities.
