= Franciosa =

Franciosa (pronounced [franˈtʃoːza]) is an Italian surname derived from an archaic term for 'French'. Notable people with the surname include:

- Anthony Franciosa (1928–2006), American actor
- Massimo Franciosa (1924–1998), Italian screenwriter and film director

== See also ==
- Franciosi
- Franciosini
