= Franciosi =

Franciosi (pronounced [franˈtʃoːzi]) is an Italian surname from Emilia-Romagna, Tuscany, Lazio and San Marino, derived from an archaic term for 'French'. Notable people with the surname include:

- Aisling Franciosi (born 1993), Irish actress
- Carlo Franciosi (1935–2021), Captain Regent of San Marino
- Gianluca Franciosi (born 1991), Italian footballer
- Leo Franciosi (born 1932), Sammarinese sports shooter
- Simone Franciosi (born 2001), Sammarinese footballer

== See also ==
- Franciosa
- Franciosini
