= Leena Löfstedt =

- Occupations: Romance philologist, Latinist

Academic background
- Education: University of Helsinki

Academic work
- Discipline: Romance philology
- Sub-discipline: Medieval Philology
- Institutions: University of Jyväskylä

Maija Leena Löfstedt (née Kekomäki; born 17 July 1937) is a Finnish Latinist and Romance philologist. She is professor emerita of Romance philology at the University of Jyväsklä in Finland and an associate of UCLA᾽s CMRS Center for Early Global Studies. She is the widow of the Swedish Latinist Bengt Löfstedt.

== Biography ==
Löfstedt completed her PhD thesis on Latin expressions of command and prohibition and their survival into Romance from the University of Helsinki in 1966, entitled "Les expressions du commandement et de a défense en latin et leur survie dans les langues romanes". She was an assistant professor of Romance philology at the University of Helsinki (1976-1978), a professor of Romance philology at the University of Jyväskylä (1978-1981), and an acting assistant professor of Romance philology at the University of Helsinki (1987, 1989, and 1991-993).

She is particularly known for her work on Vegetius (1977, 1982); for an edition of the old French translation of Gratian᾽s Decretum (1992-2001), and she has also studied individual words and grammatical structures in Latin and Old French. In 2007, a collection of papers, L᾽Art de la philologie: Mélanges en l᾽honneur de Leena Löfstedt (Mémoires de la Société Néophilologique de Helsinki, LXX, Helsinki), was published in her honour.

== Selected publications ==
- Gratiani Decretum: la traduction en ancien français du Décret de Gratien (Societas Scientarum Fennica, Helsinki, 1992).
- (with Bengt Löfstedt), De corrupti sermonis emendatione: rédaction Anvers 1540/Maturin Cordier; texte et commentaire linguistique (Lund University Press, Lund, 1989).
- (with Outi Merisalo et al.), Le livre de l᾽art de chevalerie de Vegesce: traduction anonyme de 1380 (Suomalainen Tiedeakatemia, Helsinki, 1989).
- Les expressions du commandement et de la défense en Latin et leur survie dans les langues romanes (Société Néophilologique, Helsinki, 1966).
