= RHM =

RHM may refer to:

- RHM, the FWB code for Rheinmetall, a German defence company
- RHM, the National Rail code for Reedham railway station (London), Purley, London, England
- Rank Hovis McDougall, a defunct United Kingdom food business
- Revista Hispánica Moderna, a peer-reviewed academic journal which focuses on research in Hispanic and Luso-Brazilian literature and culture
- RhM, the Rheinisches Museum für Philologie, a German journal of classical studies and philology.
