= César Oudin =

César Oudin (c. 1560 – 1 October 1625) was a French Hispanist, translator, paremiologist, grammarian and lexicographer.

He translated into French La Galatea and the first part of Don Quixote.

He wrote Grammaire espagnolle expliquée en Francois (1597) which, according to Amado Alonso, was the model for most grammars written later in other countries such as those by Heinrich Doergangk, Lorenzo Franciosini, Francisco Sobrino and Jerónimo de Texeda, among others.

His dictionary Tesoro de las dos lenguas francesa y española (1607) is based on literary texts and was later used by John Minsheu, Lorenzo Franciosini, John Stevens and other lexicographers. Girolamo Vittori expanded this dictionary with trilingual Tesoro from 1609, which was later plagiarized by Oudin in his Trésor of 1616.
