= Woodfin (surname) =

Woodfin is a surname. Notable people with the surname include:

- A. Woodfin (fl. 1756-1764), British author
- Eric Woodfin Naylor (1936–2019), American Hispanist, scholar, and educator
- Randall Woodfin (born 1981), American lawyer and politician
- Zac Woodfin (born 1983), American football coach and player
