= 1614 in literature =

This article contains information about the literary events and publications of 1614.

== Events ==
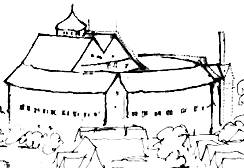
Rebuilt Globe Theatre

- January–June – In the first six months of the year, no London theatres operate on the South Bank of the Thames, causing a severe decline in demand for the watermen's taxi service. The watermen respond by proposing to limit the locations of the theaters around London, much to the actors' displeasure. John Taylor the Water Poet describes the controversy in his The True Cause of the Watermen's Suit Concerning Players.
- January 25 – The Lady Elizabeth's Men perform the formerly controversial Eastward Ho at Court.
- April – Sir Francis Bacon's dual role as Member of Parliament and Attorney General is objected to by the Parliament of England.
- May 24 – Lope de Vega becomes a priest.
- June 30 – Rebuilding of the Globe Theatre is complete.
- August 15 – Pietro Della Valle lands in Constantinople, after leaving Venice to begin his travels.
- October 31 – The first performance of Ben Jonson's Bartholomew Fair is given at Philip Henslowe's newly opened Hope Theatre in London.
- November 1 – The Lady Elizabeth's Men perform Bartholomew Fair at Court, the day after its première.
- unknown dates
  - Luís de Sousa becomes a Dominican friar.
  - Izaak Walton moves from Chancery Lane to Fleet Street, London, where he opens a shop.
  - John Webster's tragedy The Duchess of Malfi is first performed publicly, at the Globe Theatre, London.
  - Madeleine de Souvré marries the marquis de Sablé.

== New books ==
=== Prose ===
- Johannes Althusius – Politica Methodice Digesta
- Johannes Valentinus Andreae – Fama fraternitatis Roseae Crucis oder Die Bruderschaft des Ordens der Rosenkreuzer (at Kassel)
- Christoph Besold – Signatura temporum
- New edition of the King James Version of the Bible (in an easily read Roman typeface)
- "Alonso Fernández de Avellaneda" – Second Part of Don Quixote (spurious)
- Alonso Jerónimo de Salas Barbadillo – El Cavallero puntual
- Lope de Vega – Pastores de Belen: prosas y versos divinos
- Heinrich Doergangk – Institutiones in linguam hispanicam, admodum faciles, quales antehac nunquam visae
- Michael Maier – Arcana arcanissima
- Walter Raleigh - The Historie of the VVorld / In Five Bookes
- Samuel Purchas – Purchas, his Pilgrimage; or, Relations of the World and the Religions observed in all Ages

=== Drama ===
- Anonymous – The Masque of Flowers
- Samuel Daniel – Hymen's Triumph
- Lope de Vega
  - Amor secreto hasta celos
  - Fuenteovejuna (approximate date)
- John Fletcher and William Shakespeare – The Two Noble Kinsmen
- Ben Jonson – Bartholomew Fair, first performance on 31 October
- Johannes Messenius – Blanckamäreta
- Anthony Munday – Himatia-Poleos
- Robert Tailor – The Hog Hath Lost His Pearl published

=== Poetry ===
- William Browne – The Shepherd's Pipe
- Miguel de Cervantes – Viaje del Parnaso
- Lope de Vega – Rimas sacras

== Births ==
- October 12 – Henry More, English philosopher (died 1687)
- Unknown date – Hallgrímur Pétursson, Icelandic poet (died 1674)
- Probable year of birth – John Lilburne, English political writer and Leveller (died 1657)

== Deaths ==
- January 2 – Luisa Carvajal y Mendoza, Spanish poet and author (born 1556)
- March 29 – Joshua Falk, Polish Hebrew scholar (born 1555)
- April 3 – John Spenser, English classicist and cleric (born 1559)
- June 17 – William Bathe, Irish writer and priest (born 1564)
- July 1 – Isaac Casaubon, Genevan classicist and church historian (born 1559)
- July 15 – Pierre de Bourdeille, seigneur de Brantôme, French historian and biographer (born c. 1540)
- Unknown dates
  - Simon Grahame, Scottish miscellanist (born 1570)
  - Cristóbal de Virués, Spanish dramatist and poet (born 1550)

== See also ==
- English Renaissance theatre
