= Enrique Henríquez =

Portuguese Jesuit theologian (1536–1608)

Enrique Henríquez (1536 – 28 January 1608) was a Portuguese Jesuit theologian. A teacher of philosophy and theology, he later joined the Dominican Order before ultimately returning to the Jesuits.

== Life ==
Henríquez was born at Porto, in northern Portugal. Henríquez was the younger son of a New Christian (converso) physician, the Bentalhado family, related to Baruch Spinoza's maternal grandmother Maria, known as Miriam in the Jewish community.

At the age of sixteen, in 1552, he entered the Society of Jesus, whose founder Ignatius de Loyola welcomed New Christians joining the order. Henríquez's older brother, Manuel López (1525-1603), was also a Jesuit and rose to serve as Provincial (administrator) for Toledo, Spain. Henríquez became known for his philosophical and theological erudition. He taught both these branches at the Jesuit colleges of Cordova and Salamanca; in the latter place he numbered Francisco Suarez and Gregory of Valencia among his pupils.

In 1593 he left the Society of Jesus and entered the Order of St. Dominic; but he soon returned to the Jesuits. Father Alcazar (Hist. Prov. Tolet., I, 204) gave an account of this incident. After Henríquez had printed in the preface of one of his theological works some passages not approved by the censors, Claudio Acquaviva ordered him to tear out the page containing these paragraphs. Henríquez felt so disturbed over this punishment that he obtained permission from the Pope to leave the society and enter the Dominican Order. It was Gregory of Valencia who advised him to return to his former associates. On 28 January 1608, he died in Tivoli, Italy.

== Works ==
Henríquez is especially noted for two theological works:

- The first part of his "Theologiæ Moralis Summa" was published at Salamanca in 1591, the second in 1593; the work appeared again at Venice, in 1597, and 1600; at Mentz, in 1613, under the title "Summa Theologiæ Moralis libri XV" etc. It was forbidden by decree of 7 August 1603, donec corrigatur, because the author allowed confession (but not absolution) by way of letter, and held unorthodox opinions too unfavorable on the rights of the Church. In the "Summa", Henríquez treats only of the end of man, of the sacraments, and of ecclesiastical censures and irregularities; but he manages to find an opportunity of declaring himself against Molina's scientia media; he defends the Dominican theory of physical predetermination, and of a predestination antecedent to the Divine foresight of our future merits. Alphonsus Liguori esteemed the authority of Henríquez on moral questions, an opinion shared by Jean Doujat in his Prænotionum canonicarum, V. xv.
- Henríquez's second work is entitled "De pontificis romani clave, libri VI". It was published at Salamanca in 1593, but nearly all its copies were burnt by the Apostolic nuncio of Madrid on account of its allowing the king too much power over ecclesiastics. It is said that only three or four copies have been preserved among the rarities of the Escorial. The subjects treated by Henríquez in his second work are: the power and election of the Roman pontiff; the authority of the councils; the question of law. The rarity of Father Henríquez's second work is the reason why some consider its treatises as part of his "Theologiæ Moralis Summa".
