= Wilhelm Meyer-Lübke =

Swiss linguist (1861–1936)

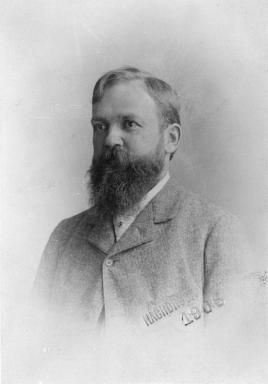
- Born: 30 January 1861; Dübendorf, Switzerland
- Died: 4 October 1936 (aged 75)

Academic background
- Education: University of Zürich; University of Berlin

Academic work
- Discipline: philology
- Sub-discipline: Romance philology
- Institutions: University of Zürich; University of Jena; University of Vienna; University of Bonn
- Notable works: Grammatik der romanischen Sprachen

Wilhelm Meyer-Lübke (Swiss Standard German: [ˈvɪlhɛlm ˈmaɪər ˈlʏpkɛ]; 30 January 1861 – 4 October 1936) was a Swiss philologist of the Neogrammarian school of linguistics.

== Biography ==
Meyer-Lübke, a nephew of Conrad Ferdinand Meyer, was born in Dübendorf, Switzerland. He studied Indo-European philology at Zürich (with Heinrich Schweizer-Sidler) and at Berlin (with Johannes Schmidt). He obtained his PhD in Romance philology with a dissertation on Die Schicksale des lateinischen Neutrums im Romanischen (1883). After a stay in Italy, he qualified to lecture at Zürich and then attended lectures by Gaston Paris in Paris.

While lecturing at Zürich in 1887, he was appointed associate professor of comparative linguistics at Jena. From there he was called in 1890 to Vienna, where he was a professor of Romance philology from 1892 to 1915, as well as serving as dean and rector (1906/07). He then went to Bonn, where he was appointed to the professorship formerly held by Friedrich Diez. However, Meyer-Lübke soon felt the difference between the cosmopolitan Vienna and provincial Bonn. He consoled himself with lecture tours and visiting professorships abroad. Meyer-Lübke was a leading Romance linguist of his time.

== Key published works ==
- Grammatik der romanischen Sprachen ("Grammar of the Romance Languages") published in 4 volumes between 1890 and 1902.
- Einführung in das Studium der romanischen Sprachwissenschaft ("Introduction to the Study of Romance Linguistics"), 1901.
- Romanisches etymologisches Wörterbuch ("Etymological Dictionary of Romance"), Heidelberg, C. Winter, 1911.
