= Ruth Fine =

Argentine born Israeli academic

- רות פיין
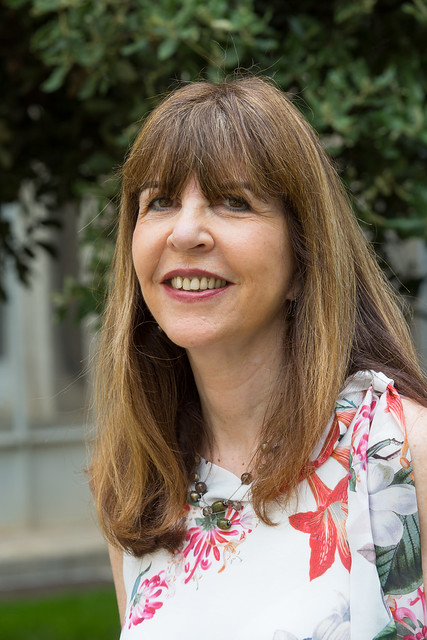
- Prof Fine
- Born: 1957 (age 68–69); Buenos Aires, Argentina
- Education: Universidad de Buenos Aires – The Hebrew University of Jerusalem
- Occupations: Professor of Spanish and Latin-American literature

Ruth Fine (Hebrew: רות פיין; born 1957 in Buenos Aires, Argentina) is Salomon and Victoria Cohen Professor of Spanish and Latin-American literature at the Hebrew University of Jerusalem.

== Biography ==
Ruth Fine is Spanish Professor at the Department of Spanish and Latin American Studies at the Hebrew University of Jerusalem. She served as Director of the European Forum and of the Institute of Western Cultures at the same academic institution. Fine also was founder and first president of the Association of Hispanists in Israel. She is Honorary President of the International Association of Hispanists and President of the International Association of Cervantistas. She was awarded with the Orden del Mérito Civil by Spain. Since 2016 she is Correspondent Member of the Spanish Royal Academy and since 2023 Correspondent Member of the Academia Argentina de Letras. In 2019 she received an Honoris Causa Doctorate from the University of Navarra.

== Published works ==
- Fine, Ruth. Don Quixote: Cervantes' Journey to the Modern Novel, Jerusalem: Magnes University Press, 2024 (in Hebrew).
- Fine, Ruth; Florinda F. Goldberg; and Or Hasson (eds.), Mundos del hispanismo: una cartografía para del siglo XXI. Madrid: Iberoamericana/Vervuert, 2022 [240 pages in print + ca. 250 articles in open access]
- Fine, Ruth and Susanne Zepp (eds.). Jewish Literatures in Spanish and Portuguese: A Comprehensive Handbook, Berlin, Boston: De Gruyter, 2022.
- Fine, Ruth,Reescrituras bíblicas cervantinas, (2014), Biblioteca Áurea Hispánica-Iberoamericana. Frankfurt am Main/Madrid: Vervuert / Iberoamericana.
- Fine, Ruth, Michele Guillemont and Juan Diego Vila (eds.) (2013), Lo converso: orden imaginario y realidad en la cultura española (siglos XIV-XVII), Madrid-Frankfurt Am Main: Iberoamericana-Vervuert, 536 pp.
- Fine, Ruth y Daniel Blaustein (eds.) (2012), La fe en el universo literario de Jorge Luis Borges. Jerusalem, Van Leer Institute and Hildesheim ן¿½ Zürich ן¿½ New York: Georg Olms Verlag, TKKL Series directed by Alfonso de Toro.
- Casado, Manuel, Ruth Fine y Carlos Mata (eds.) (2012), Jerusalén-Toledo. Historias de dos ciudades. Biblioteca Áurea Hispánica, Frankfurt am Main / Madrid: Vervuert / Iberoamericana.279 pp.
- R. Fine y C. Mata (eds.) (2010) Textos sin fronteras. Literatura y sociedad, Pamplona, Editorial EUNSA.
- Fine, Ruth and Ignacio Arellano (eds.)(2009) La Biblia en la literatura del Siglo de Oro.Biblioteca Áurea Hispánica, Frankfurt am Main/Madrid: Vervuert/Iberoamericana.
- Fine, Ruth and Santiago López Navia (eds.)(2008). Cervantes y las religiones. Biblioteca Áurea Hispánica, Frankfurt am Main/Madrid: Vervuert/Iberoamericana.
- Una lectura semiótico-narratológica del Quijote en el contexto del Siglo de Oro español. Frankfurt am Main/Madrid: Vervuert/Iberoamericana, 2006.
