= Leslie Walton =

Academic (died 1960)

Leslie Bannister Walton (1894 or 1895 – 9 September) was an academic in Hispanic Studies at the University of Edinburgh and a Hispanist.

== Life ==
Walton was educated at University College, London and Jesus College, Oxford, where he was awarded a first-class degree in medieval and modern languages. His association with the University of Edinburgh began in 1920, and he rose to become Forbes Reader in Spanish and head of the Department of Hispanic Studies. His writings included a critical study of the Spanish novelist Perez Galdos and editions of classical Spanish works. He also lectured for the Ministry of Information and the British Council in Spain and South America. He died on 9 September 1960 in Edinburgh, aged 64.
