= Alison Sinclair (literary critic) =

British Hispanist (born 1946)

Alison Sinclair is a professor of Modern Spanish Literature and Intellectual History at the University of Cambridge, Hispanist, and a fellow of Clare College, Cambridge.

== Selected publications ==
- The Deceived Husband (Oxford: UP, 1993)
- Dislocations of Desire: Gender, Identity, and Strategy in "La Regenta" (North Carolina, 1998)
- Unamuno, the Unknown, and the Vicissitudes of the Self (Manchester: UP, 2001)
- Sex and Society in Early Twentieth-Century Spain: Hildegart Rodríguez and the World League for Sexual Reform (2007)
