= Susanne Zepp =

German literary scholar

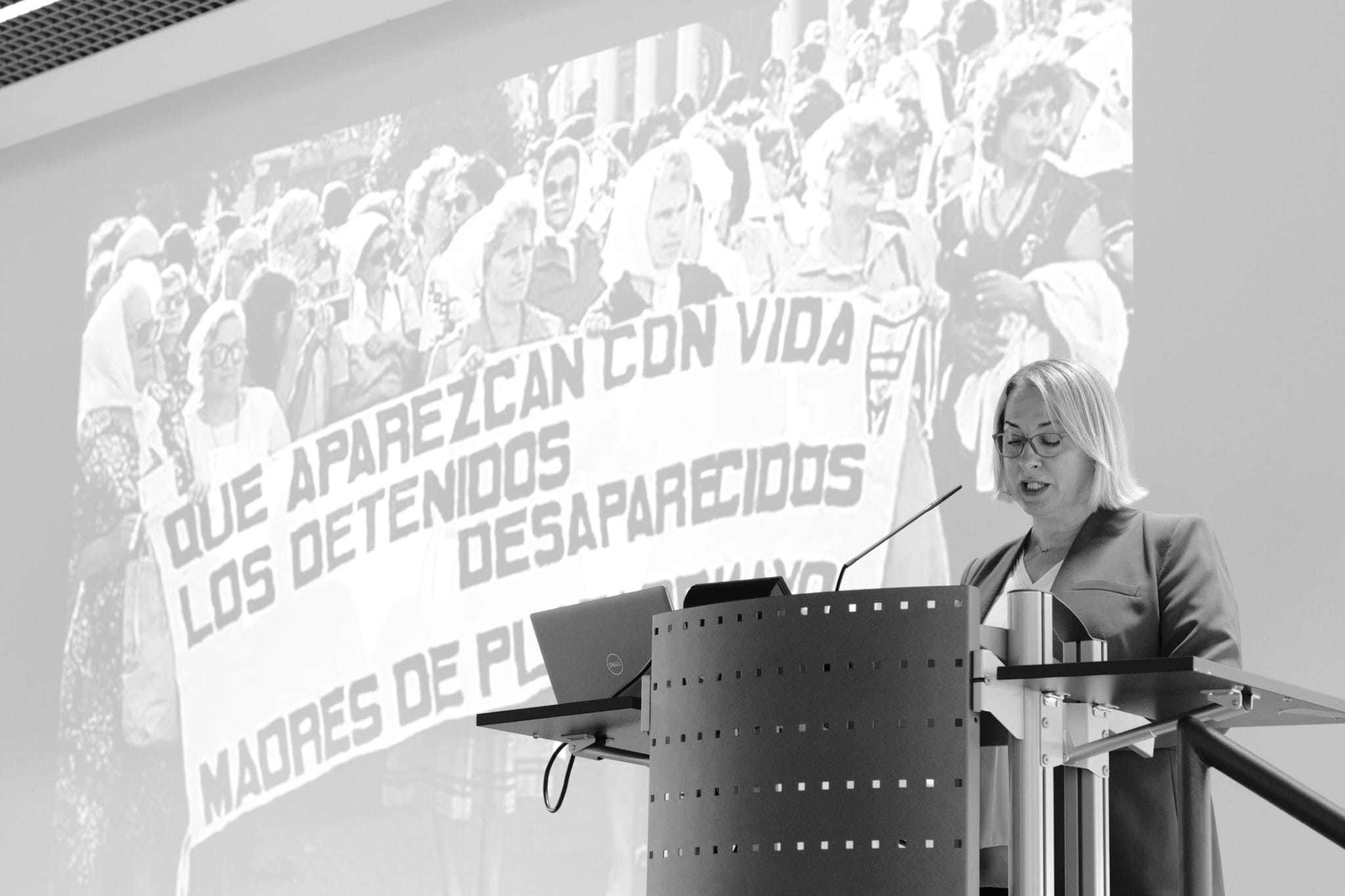
- Susanne Zepp
- Other name: Susanne Zepp-Zwirner

Academic work
- Discipline: Literary theory
- Sub-discipline: Spanish literature (Middle Ages, early modern period, 20th century) Latin American, Portuguese, and French literature (Middle Ages, early modern period, 19th and 20th century) literary and cultural theory Jewish literatures law and literature
- Institutions: University of Duisburg-Essen (UDE)

Susanne Zepp is a German literary scholar.

== Education and career ==
Zepp received her M.A. in Romance Studies, Comparative Literature, and Modern German Studies at the University of Wuppertal. Starting in 1997 she served as a lecturer at the Institute for Romance Philology at the University of Wuppertal. She received her doctorate at Freie Universität Berlin in Romance Philology in 2002. From 2003 to 2015, she served as the deputy director of the Simon Dubnow Institute for Jewish History and Culture at the University of Leipzig, and from 2011 to 2023, she was Full Professor of Romance Philology at Freie Universität Berlin. Starting with the summer semester of 2023, she has served as a professor of Spanish and Latin American Literatures at the University of Duisburg-Essen.

As of 2025 Zepp is co-editor of the Romanistisches Jahrbuch (Yearbook of Romance Languages and Literatures). From 2019 to 2023, she served as President of the German Hispanist Association.

== Work ==
Her research focuses on Spanish literature (Middle Ages, early modern period, 20th century), Latin American, Portuguese, and French literature (Middle Ages, early modern period, 19th and 20th century), literary and cultural theory, Jewish literatures, and law and literature.

== Selected publications ==
- Untold Stories of the Spanish Civil War (ed. Raanan Rein), London: Routledge (Canada Blanch Studies on Contemporary Spain), 2023.
- Jewish Literatures in Spanish and Portuguese. A Comprehensive Handbook (ed. with Ruth Fine), Berlin: De Gruyter, 2022.
- Migration und Avantgarde. (ed. with Stephanie Bung), Berlin: De Gruyter, 2020.
- Nobelpreisträgerinnen. 14 Schriftstellerinnen im Porträt (ed. with Claudia Olk), Berlin: De Gruyter, 2019.
- An Early Self. Jewish Belonging in Romance Literature, 1499-1627, Redwood: Stanford University Press, 2014.
- Portugiesisch-brasilianische Literaturwissenschaft. Eine Einführung, Paderborn: Fink Verlag, 2014 (= UTB 2498).
- Hispanistik (zus. mit Natascha Pomino) (= UTB 2498), Paderborn: Fink Verlag, 2004 (2. Auflage 2008).
- Jorge Luis Borges und die Skepsis, Stuttgart: Steiner Verlag, 2003.

== Honors and awards ==
In 2023, she was awarded the Order of Isabella the Catholic, which was presented by the Spanish ambassador Ricardo Martínez Vázquez.
