= Edgar Allison Peers =

English academic (1891-1952)

- Born: 7 May 1891; Leighton Buzzard, Bedfordshire, England
- Died: 21 December 1952 (aged 61); Liverpool, Merseyside, England
- Education: Dartford Grammar School
- Alma mater: Christ's College, Cambridge
- Known for: Research on Spanish
- Scientific career
- Fields: Education theory, Hispanicist
- Workplaces: University of Liverpool
- Other name: Bruce Truscot
- Spouse: Marion Young (m. 1924)
- Children: 0

Edgar Allison Peers (7 May 1891 – 21 December 1952), also known by his pseudonym Bruce Truscot, was an English Hispanist and education management scholar. He was Professor in Hispanic Studies at the University of Liverpool and is notable for founding the Modern Humanities Research Association (in 1918) and the Bulletin of Hispanic Studies (in 1934).

As "Bruce Truscot", a pseudonym kept secret until his death, Peers wrote three books offering a critique of the policies and problems associated with British universities, coining the term "red-brick university".

== Biography ==
Peers was born on 7 May 1891 at Leighton Buzzard, the son of John Thomas Peers, a civil servant, and his wife, Jessie Dale, daughter of Charles Allison.

He was educated at Dartford Grammar School and Christ's College, Cambridge, where he was a scholar and prizeman. In 1910 he gained a second-class honours BA in English and French, an external degree of the University of London, and in 1912 he took a first in the medieval and modern languages tripos at Cambridge. Obtaining a teacher's diploma (first class with double distinction) from Cambridge in 1913, Peers taught modern languages at Mill Hill School, Felsted School, Essex and then at Wellington College. In 1920, he became a lecturer in Spanish at the University of Liverpool and in 1922 was appointed to the Gilmour Chair of Spanish at the university, where he remained for the rest of his life.

At Liverpool, Peers lectured and published prolifically in Spanish Studies, attending conferences and visiting schools. His most important research was conducted in the fields of 19th century Romanticism and 16th century mysticism in Spain: a number of his critical works were translated into Spanish and republished in Spain. In 1923, he founded a quarterly journal, the Bulletin of Spanish Studies (which became the Bulletin of Hispanic Studies from 1949), a publication of which he was editor until his death. He also founded the Institute of Hispanic Studies at Liverpool in 1934.

Peers was married, on 19 March 1924, to Marion Young. They had no children.

Peers died of heart failure, on 21 December 1952, at the David Lewis Northern Hospital in Liverpool.

== Bruce Truscot ==
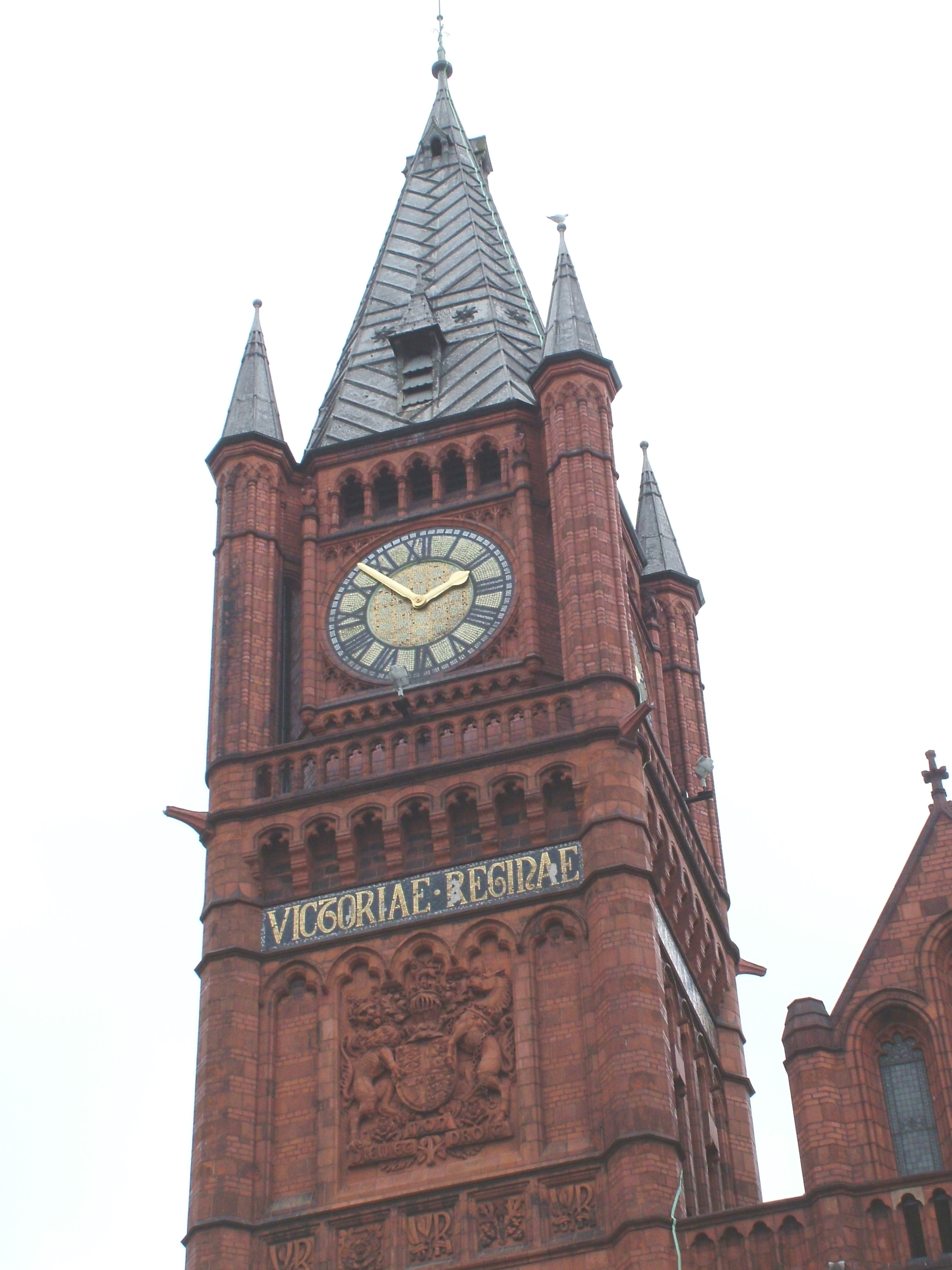
The Victoria Building of the University of Liverpool was designed by Alfred Waterhouse and opened in 1892. Like many Victorian university buildings, it is built of red bricks.

Peers had a keen interest in, and strong views about the aims and methods of higher education. In 1943 he published the first part of a rhetorical book, Redbrick University, a controversial and influential work which argued in favor of the primacy of research over teaching in universities. The fictional Redbrick University of the title is a cipher for the modern, civic universities (like his own institution, Liverpool), whose buildings were Victorian-built and often using red brick. The term "red brick university" came to be applied to a handful of civic universities founded in the late nineteenth and early twentieth centuries.

The work being of a controversial nature, Peers wrote it under the pseudonym "Bruce Truscot" and kept the identity of the author a secret. His authorship was only revealed after his death, in 1952. Redbrick University was followed by two sequels, Redbrick and these Vital Days (1945), and First Year at the University (1946), which continued the theme.

== Selected works ==
Peers published a number of translations of Spanish works, including the complete writings of St John of the Cross (in three volumes, 1934–5) and St Teresa of Ávila (five volumes in total, including her Letters, 1946–51), as well as translations and a 1929 biography of Ramon Llull. Other significant works include:

- Elizabethan Drama and its Mad Folk (1914)
- The Origins of French Romanticism (1920, with M. B. Finch)
- Studies of the Spanish Mystics (1927–30, 2 volumes)
- Spain, a Companion to Spanish Studies (1929)
- Spain, a Companion to Spanish Travel (1930)
- The Pyrenees, French and Spanish (1932)
- The Spanish Tragedy (1936)
- Catalonia infelix (1937)
- A Handbook to the Study and Teaching of Spanish (1938)
- Spain, the Church and the Orders (1939)
- History of the Romantic Movement in Spain (1940, 2 volumes)
- The Spanish Dilemma (1940)
- Spain in Eclipse (1943)
- A Critical Anthology of Spanish Verse (1948)

=== Pseudonymously-published works ===
- Redbrick University 1943 [first part, second part in 1945 and the whole work was published in Pelican Books in 1951]
- Redbrick and these Vital Days (1945)
- First Year at the University (1946)
