= Giovanni Mario Alessandri =

Italian Hispanist and grammarian from the 16c

Giovanni Mario Alessandri was an Italian Hispanist and grammarian from the 16th century.

He spent a time at the Spanish royal court and he wrote the first Spanish grammar for Italians, Il Paragone della Lingua Toscana et Castigliana (Nápoles: Mattia Cancer, 1560). There he is particularly careful with phonetics. This work was inspirational for Giovanni Miranda's Osservationi de la lingua castigliana.
