= Bulletin of Hispanic Studies =

- Discipline: Latin American studies
- Language: English

Publication details
- History: 1923–present
- Publisher: Liverpool University Press for the Department of Modern Languages and Cultures, University of Liverpool (United Kingdom)
- Frequency: 10/year

Standard abbreviations
- ISO 4: Bull. Hisp. Stud.

Indexing
- ISSN: 1475-3839 (print); 1478-3398 (web)

Links
- Journal homepage

The Bulletin of Hispanic Studies is a peer-reviewed academic journal published by Liverpool University Press for the Department of Modern Languages and Cultures, University of Liverpool. It was founded by Edgar Allison Peers in 1923. It is indexed and abstracted in:

- Arts and Humanities Citation Index
- Current Contents/Arts & Humanities
- Scopus
