= Gustav Gröber =

German Romance philologist

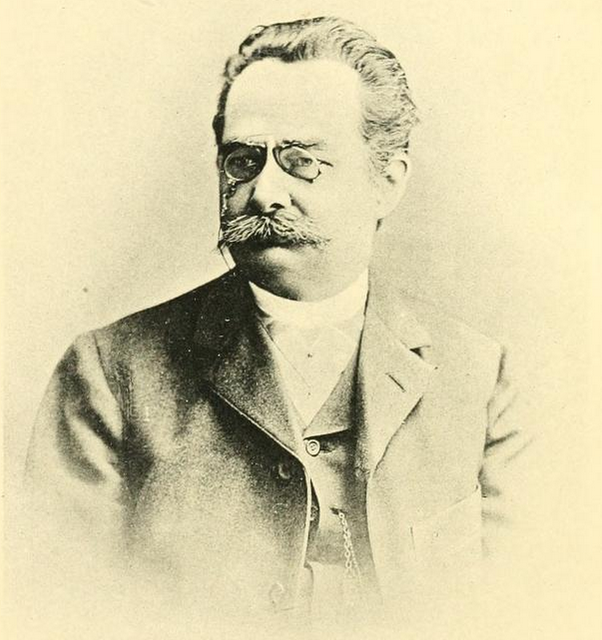
- Gustav Gröber
- Born: 4 May 1844; Leipzig
- Died: 6 November 1911 (aged 67)
- Occupation: Romance philologist

Gustav Gröber (4 May 1844 in Leipzig – 6 November 1911 in Ruprechtsau near Strasbourg) was a German Romance philologist.

He received his education at Leipzig, taught at Zurich (1871–74), and later became professor at Breslau and the University of Strassburg. His principal work was in Romance literature and linguistics. His student, Ernst Curtius, dedicated his classic study, “ European Literature and the Latin Middle Ages” to Gröber.

== Works ==
He edited Zeitschrift für romanische Philologie (Journal of Romance philology, 1877) and Grundriss der romanischen Philologie (Outline of Romance philology, 2d ed., Vol. I, Strassburg 1904-06). Among his other works are:

- Die handschriftlichen Gestaltungen der Chanson de Geste von Fierabras (The manuscript structure of the Chanson de Geste of Fierabras, 1869)
- Die altfranzösichen Romanzen und Pastourellen (The old French Romances and pastorals, Zurich, 1872)
- Carmina Clericorum (7th ed., 1890)
- Abriss der französischen Litteratur des Mittelalters (Outline of French literature of the Middle Ages, 1897)
