= Girolamo Vittori =

Girolamo Vittori was an Italian Hispanist and lexicographer from the 17th century.

He wrote a trilingual dictionary, Tesoro de las tres lenguas francesa, italiana y española (Geneva: Philippe Albert & Alexandre Pernet, 1609) which takes a lot of the work of the French authors César Oudin and Jean Nicot.
