= Giovanni Miranda =

Italian Hispanist and grammarian (fl. 1500s)

Giovanni Miranda was an Italian Hispanist and grammarian from the 16th century.

He wrote the important Osservationi della lingua castigliana... diuise in quatro libri: ne’ quali s’insegna con gran facilità la perfetta lingua spagnuola. Con due tauole: l’vna de’ capi essentiali, & l’altra delle cose notabile (Venice: Gabriel Giolito de Ferrari, 1566; modern edition of Juan M. Lope Blanch, Mexico: UNAM, 1998), partially inspired by the work of Giovanni Mario Alessandri.

== Biography ==
Not much is known about Giovanni Miranda's life. We know that he was of Spanish origin because he himself states this in the prologue to Osservationi. He moved to Italy and settled in Venice before 1566, the year in which the Osservationi were published. According to some scholars (Carreras), Miranda arrived in Italy as an interpreter and spy in the service of an ambassador of Charles V.

He was a cultured man and knew not only the classical languages, Greek and Latin, but also Italian and German. His knowledge of Italian is evident in his translations of several works by Fray Luis de Granada, the chivalric novella Historia del Valoroso Cavalier Polismán, and the Dialogues of Massimo Troiano. He also wrote the prologue to the scientific text Dos libros de Cosmographia by Gerónimo Girava Tarragonés.
