= El juez de los divorcios =

Short humorous play

“El juez de los divorcios” is a short humorous play written by Miguel de Cervantes Saavedra. It was published in 1615 as part of his theatrical anthology Ocho comedias y ocho entremeses nunca representados. As the title suggests, “El juez de los divorcios” and the other seven interludes in the anthology were probably never performed in a theatre by the time of publication.

== Plot ==
The interlude follows a series of couples consulting a judge and petitioning for a divorce. There are three couples and a married “ganapán” (handyman). Mariana and Vejete appear first. Mariana, a young woman, says that her marriage with an older sick man is consuming her youth and her time. Vejete argues that Mariana only desires to steal his inheritance. However, there is tension as to who this money belongs to since Mariana’s parents paid Vejete for marrying their daughter.

Both Mariana and Vejete are very fiery in their statements. The judge corrects Mariana and advises her to calm down. Vejete later suggests that they should both join monasteries to solve their issue. Mariana refuses due to her youth and potential.

This case is not resolved before a new couple joins. Doña Guiomar is frustrated because her husband, a soldier, cannot find a job. She states that he is constantly gambling and playing while she carries all the home responsibilities. The judge asks deeper questions but the scribe announces the arrival of another couple.

Minjaca and the surgeon (lower rank than doctor at the time that dealt with minor surgical problems) wanted a divorce but the judge states that their request needs to be further reviewed. Minjaca says that her husband is not who she thought she was marrying. She reveals he pretended to be a doctor when in reality he was just a surgeon. The surgeon says it is impossible to live with Minjaca.

Finally, the ganapán asks for a divorce, identifying as a cristiano viejo (christian who was born to Christians and thus not a convert). He says that his wife lives a negative lifestyle and that she tried to deceive him. The judge tries to explain the logistics of this process when musicians arrive. The musicians speak to the judge and perform a piece about divorce which lyrics are the last part of the entremés.

== Characters ==
In order of appearance:

Mariana: a young woman asking to be divorced from her husband, el Vejete, to whom she has been married for twenty two years. Her argument is that her marriage forces her to take care of her aging husband and prevents her from enjoying her youth.

Vejete: old man who is married to Mariana. He argues that her wife is trying to kill him with her lack of care, so that she can inherit his land and money.

Judge: legislative official to whom the citizens of the town plead to be divorced from their partners. In the play, he never certifies a divorce, but rather maintains records of the testimonies and encourages couples to reconcile their differences.

Scribe: assistant of the court, whose job is to maintain written records of the petitions for divorce.

Attorney: legislative official knowledgeable of the laws established for divorces.

Doña Guiomar: woman from a good Christian family who is asking to be divorced from her military husband because he lacks the initiative and ability to economically sustain their family. She establishes that her husband does not provide for the family and that she is forced to carry this responsibility.

Soldier: Doña Guiomar’s husband, criticizes the absence of his wife in the home and describes their matrimony as captivity. His defense is that as much effort as he has put into finding a job, no one wants to hire him.

Surgeon: doctor who wants to get divorced from Aldonza de Minjaca. He accuses her of being evil.

Aldonza de Minjaca: the surgeon's wife. She describes him as Lucifer and accuses him of deceiving her saying he was a medic, when he was really a surgeon.

Ganapán: an old Christian handyman who arrives wearing a leather hood cracked by the wear and tear of the years. Recounts the story of how he promised to marry the wrong woman while drunk. He is now asking for a divorce because the woman is prideful and quarrelsome.

Musicians: arrive at the court to announce a party being thrown by a couple who had previously asked the judge for a divorce. Since then, they had reconciled their differences. The musicians finish the short play with a song about the beauty of love and the perils of divorce.

== Related sources ==
- “Un pasaje cervantino dificultoso en El juez de los divorcios”
- “El juez, el dramaturgo y el relojero: justicia y lectura como ciencias inexactas en El juez de los divorcios de Cervantes”
- "La ruptura matrimonial en El juez de los divorcios de Cervantes"
- “La Libertad Femenina En Los Entremeses de Cervantes: El Juez de Los Divorcios y El Viejo Celoso”
- "El entremés de El juez de los divorcios y otros infelicísimos malcasados"
- “La función ‘carnavalesca’ de las referencias musicales en El juez de los divorcios y La elección de los alcaldes de Daganzo de Cervantes”
- “El juez de los divorcios de Cervantes y El marido fantasma de Quevedo: estudio comparativo de dos entremeses sobre el matrimonio”
- “«Y así, a todos os recibo a prueba»: Risa e ideología en El juez de los divorcios de Cervantes.”
- "El juez de los divorcios o la institución matrimonial en entredicho(s)"
- "El juego de los espejos en El juez de los divorcios"
- "El espacio literario en El juez de los divorcios"
