= Eric Woodfin Naylor =

American Hispanist, scholar, and educator (1936–2019)

Eric Woodfin Naylor (December 6, 1936 – September 16, 2019) was an American Hispanist, scholar and educator.

Naylor was born in Union City, Tennessee. He completed his undergraduate work at The University of the South and a PhD at University of Wisconsin. At Wisconsin, he began studying El libro de buen amor. He continued studying it and has conducted paleography on the original text. He was a professor emeritus of The University of the South where he served as William R. Kenan Professor of Spanish.

In 2013, he and Professor Jerry R. Rank published a translation and discussion of Alfonso Martínez de Toledo's Arcipreste de Talavera. Naylor and Rank's work was titled The Archpriest of Talavera: Dealing with the Vices of Wicked Women and the Complexions of Men and it was reviewed in The Medieval Review and La corónica: A Journal of Medieval Hispanic Languages, Literatures, and Cultures.

Naylor died on September 16, 2019.
