= Friedrich Bouterwek =

German philosopher and critic (1766–1828)

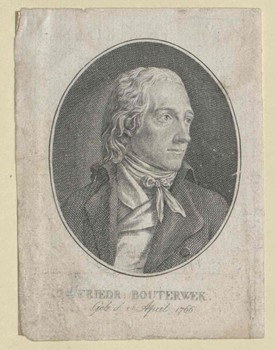
Friedrich Bouterwek

Friedrich Ludewig Bouterwek (German: [ˈbuːtɐvɛk]; 15 April 1766 – 9 August 1828) was a German philosopher and critic, born to a mining director at Oker, Saxony.

== Life ==
Bouterwek studied law and philology under Christian Gottlob Heyne and Johann Georg Heinrich Feder at the University of Göttingen.

After he had finished his studies he was appointed to the Hanover Appellate Court, whilst, backed by Johann Wilhelm Ludwig Gleim, he also gave his debut as an author under the pen name Ferdinand Adrianow in the Göttinger Musenalmanach published by Gottfried August Bürger. He returned to Göttingen as a lecturer in history, from 1790, however, he became a disciple of Immanuel Kant and published Aphorismen, den Freunden der Vernunftkritik nach Kantischer Lehre vorgelegt (1793). In 1802 he became professor ordinarius of philosophy at Göttingen, where he remained till his death.

As a philosopher, he is interesting for his criticism of the theory of the "thing-in-itself" (Ding-an-sich, noumenon). For the pure reason, as described in the Kritik, the "thing-in-itself" can be only an inconceivable "something-in-general"; any statement about it involves the predication of Reality, Unity and Plurality, which belong not to the absolute thing but to phenomena. On the other hand, the subject is known by the fact of will, and the object by that of resistance; the cognizance of willing is the assertion of absolute reality in the domain of relative knowledge. This doctrine has since been described as absolute Virtualism.

Following this train of thought, Bouterwek left the Kantian position through his opposition to its formalism. In later life he inclined to the views of Friedrich Heinrich Jacobi, whose letters to him (published at Göttingen, 1868) shed much light on the development of his thought.

Bouterwek died at Göttingen.

== Work ==
His chief philosophical works are:

- Ideen zu einer allgemeinen Apodiktik (Göttingen and Halle, 1799)
- Aesthetik (Leipzig, 1806; Göttingen, 1815 and 1824)
- Lehrbuch des philos. Vorkenntnisse (Göttingen, 1810 and 1820)
- Lehrbuch der philos Wissenschaften (Göttingen, 1813 and 1820).

In these works he dissociated himself from the Kantian school. His chief critical work was the Geschichte der neuern Poesie und Beredsamkeit (Göttingen, 12 vols., 1801–1819), of which the history of Spanish literature has been published separately in French, Spanish and English. The Geschichte is a work of wide learning and generally sound criticism, but it is not of equal merit throughout. He also wrote three novels, Paulus Septimus (Halle, 1795), Graf Donamar (Göttingen, 1791) and Ramiro (Leipzig, 1804), and published a collection of poems (Göttingen, 1802).
