= Friedrich Christian Diez =

German philologist (1794–1876)

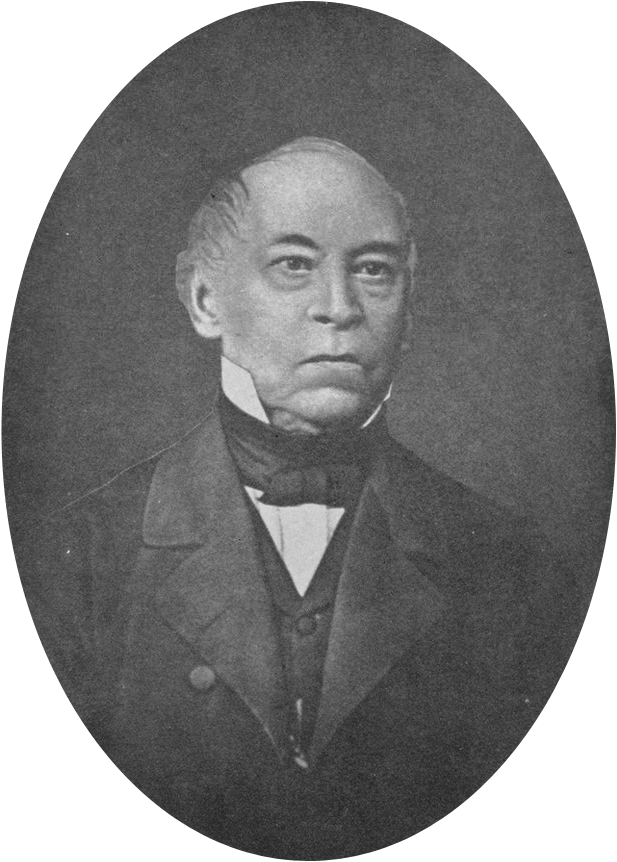
- Born: 15 March 1794; Giessen, Landgraviate of Hesse-Darmstadt
- Died: 29 May 1876 (aged 82); Bonn, German Empire
- Occupation: Philologist

Academic background
- Education: University of Giessen

Friedrich Christian Diez (German: [diːts]; 15 March 1794 – 29 May 1876) was a German philologist. The two works on which his fame rests are the Grammar of the Romance Languages (published 1836–1844), and the Etymological Dictionary of the Romance Languages (1853, and later editions). He spent most of his career at University of Bonn.

== Biography ==
Diez was born at Giessen, in Hessen-Darmstadt. He was educated first at the gymnasium and then at the university of his native town and Göttingen. There he studied classics under Friedrich Gottlieb Welcker who had just returned from a two years' residence in Italy to fill the chair of archaeology and Greek literature. It was Welcker who kindled in him a love of Italian poetry, and thus gave the first outlet to his genius. In 1813 he joined the Hesse corps as a volunteer and served in the French campaign. Next year he returned to his books, and this short taste of military service was the only break in a long and uneventful life of literary labours.

At his parents' desire he applied himself for a short time to law, but a visit to Goethe in 1818 gave a new direction to his studies, and determined his future career. Goethe had been reading Raynouard's Selections from the Romance Poets, and advised the young scholar to explore the rich mine of Provençal literature which the French savant had opened up. This advice was eagerly followed, and henceforth Diez devoted himself to Romance literature. He thus became the founder of Romance philology.

After supporting himself for some years by private teaching, he moved in 1822 to University of Bonn, where he held the position of privatdozent. In 1823 he published his first work, An Introduction to Romance Poetry; in the following year appeared The Poetry of the Troubadours, and in 1829 The Lives and Works of the Troubadours. In 1830 he was called to the chair of modern literature.

The rest of his life was mainly occupied with the composition of the two great works on which his fame rests, the Grammar of the Romance Languages (1836–1844), and the Etymological Dictionary of the Romance Languages (1853, and later editions). In these two works Diez did for the Romance group of languages what Jacob Grimm did for the Germanic family.

The earliest French philologists, such as Perion and Henri Estienne, had sought to discover the origin of French in Greek and even in Hebrew. For more than a century Gilles Ménage's Etymological Dictionary (1650, 1670) held the field without a rival. Considering the time at which it was written, Ménage's was a meritorious work, but philology was then in the infant stage, and many of Ménage's derivations (such as that of "rat" from the Latin "mus," or of "haricot" from "faba") have since become bywords among philologists. A great advance was made by Raynouard, who by his critical editions of the works of the Troubadours, published in the first years of the 19th century, laid the foundations on which Diez afterwards built.

The difference between Diez's method and that of his predecessors is well stated by him in the preface to his dictionary. In sum, it is the difference between science and guess-work. The scientific method is to follow implicitly the discovered principles and rules of phonology, and not to swerve a foot's breadth from them unless plain, actual exceptions shall justify it; to follow the genius of the language, and by cross-questioning to elicit its secrets; to gauge each letter and estimate the value which attaches to it in each position; and lastly to possess the true philosophic spirit which is prepared to welcome any new fact, though it may modify or upset the most cherished theory.

== Works ==
Such is the historical method which Diez pursues in his grammar and dictionary. To collect and arrange facts is, as he tells us, the sole secret of his success, and he adds in other words the apophthegm of Newton, "hypotheses non fingo". The introduction to the grammar consists of two parts: the first discusses the Latin, Greek and Teutonic elements common to the Romance languages; the second treats of the six dialects separately, their origin and the elements peculiar to each. The grammar itself is divided into four books, on phonology, on flexion, on the formation of words by composition and derivation, and on syntax.

His dictionary is divided into two parts. The first contains words common to two at least of the three principal groups of Romance—Italian and Romanian, Spanish and Portuguese, and Provençal and French. The Italian, as nearest the original, is placed at the head of each article. The second part treats of words peculiar to one group. There is no separate glossary of Wallachian.
