= Ernst Robert Curtius =

German philologist and literary scholar (1886-1956)

Ernst Robert Curtius

Ernst Robert Curtius (/ˈkʊərtsiʊs/; 14 April 1886 – 19 April 1956) was a German literary scholar, philologist, and Romance languages literary critic, best known for his 1948 study Europäische Literatur und Lateinisches Mittelalter, translated in English as European Literature and the Latin Middle Ages.

== Biography ==
Curtius was Alsatian, born in Thann, into a north German family; Ernst Curtius, his grandfather, and Georg Curtius, his great-uncle, were both notable scholars. His family moved to Strasbourg after his father Friedrich Curtius was appointed president of the Lutheran Protestant Church of Augsburg Confession of Alsace and Lorraine, and Curtius received his Abitur from the Strasbourg Protestant gymnasium. He studied at Strasbourg under Gustav Gröber. He traveled in Europe afterward, and was fluent in French and English. Albert Schweitzer, who boarded with the family between 1906 and 1912, is credited with introducing Curtius to modern French literature; of great influence also was the Romance philologist Gustav Gröber. He studied philology and philosophy in Strasbourg (doctorate, 1910), Berlin, and Heidelberg; he wrote his Habilitationsschrift for Gröber in Bonn, 1913, and began teaching there in 1914. World War I interrupted his scholarly work: Curtius served in France and Poland and was wounded in 1915; his injuries were severe enough for him to be discharged in 1916; he returned to Bonn to resume teaching. At Heidelberg, in 1924, he was appointed to the University’s chair of Romance Philology.

== Work ==
Much of Curtius's work was done while the Nazis were in power, and his interest in humanist studies is usually seen as a response to the totalitarianism of his times. Curtius saw European literature as part of a continuous tradition that began with the Greek and Latin authors and continued throughout the Middle Ages; he did not acknowledge a break between those traditions, a division that would separate historical periods from each other and support a set of national literatures without connections to each other. Greatly interested in French literature, early in his career he promoted the study of that literature in a period in Germany when it was considered the enemy's literature, a "humanist and heroic" stance that earned him the criticism of the nationalist intelligentsia in Germany.

He is best known for his 1948 work Europäische Literatur und Lateinisches Mittelalter. It is a study of Medieval Latin literature and its effect on subsequent writing in modern European languages. Curtius argues that, first, the standard "Classic-Medieval-Renaissance-Modern" division of literature was counterproductive given the continuity between those literatures; and second, that, in the words of L.R. Lind, "much of Renaissance and later European literature cannot be fully understood without a knowledge of that literature's relation to Medieval Latin rhetoric in the use of commonplaces, metaphors, turns of phrase, or, to employ the term Curtius prefers, topoi". The book was largely responsible for introducing the concept of the "literary topos" into scholarly and critical discussion of literary commonplaces.

== Bibliography ==
- Die literarischen Wegbereiter des neuen Frankreich (1919)
- Die Französische Kultur (1931), translation as The Civilization of France: An Introduction (1932)
- Deutscher Geist in Gefahr (1932)
- "Zur Literarästhetik des Mittelalters," Zeitschrift für romanische Philologie 58 (1938), 1–50, 129–232, and 433–79
- Europäische Literatur und lateinisches Mittelalter (1948), translation as European Literature and the Latin Middle Ages by Willard R. Trask
- Französischer Geist im 20. Jahrhundert (1952)
