= Revista Hispánica Moderna =

- Discipline: Hispanic and Luso-Brazilian literary and cultural studies
- Language: Spanish, Portuguese, English
- Edited by: Graciela Montaldo

Publication details
- Former name: Boletín del Instituto de las Españas
- History: 1934 to present
- Publisher: The University of Pennsylvania Press for the Hispanic Institute, Columbia University (United States)
- Frequency: Semiannual

Standard abbreviations
- ISO 4: Rev. Hisp. Mod.

Indexing
- ISSN: 0034-9593 (print); 1944-6446 (web)

Links
- Journal homepage

Revista Hispánica Moderna (Modern Hispanic Journal) is a peer-reviewed academic journal which focuses on research in Hispanic and Luso-Brazilian literature and culture. It was founded in 1934 as Boletín del Instituto de las Españas at Columbia University. As of 2024 the editor is Graciela Montaldo, a professor in the Department of Latin American and Iberian Cultures at Columbia University. The journal is published semi-annually by the University of Pennsylvania Press. It is available online through Project MUSE and JSTOR.

The Council of Editors of Learned Journals awarded the Revista Hispánica Moderna the 2009 Phoenix Award for Significant Editorial Achievement.
