= Jean Doujat =

French lawyer

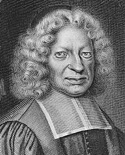
Jean Doujat

Jean Doujat (1609, in Toulouse – 27 October 1688, in Paris) was a French lawyer, juris consultus, professor of canon law at the Collège royal, docteur-régent at the faculté de droit de Paris, preceptor of the Dauphin and historian. His works include histories of the reign of Louis XIV.

He wrote an important Grammaire espagnole abrégée.
