= Lorenzo Franciosini =

Lorenzo Franciosini di Castelfiorentino (c. 1600 in Castelfiorentino – after 1645) was an Italian Hispanist, translator, lexicographer and grammarian.

He wrote an important Vocabolario italiano, e spagnolo (Italian–Spanish Dictionary; Rome, 1620), a Grammatica spagnuola ed italiana (Italian–Spanish Grammar; Venice, 1624), and some works in Latin: De particulis Italicae orationis […] (Florence, 1637), Fax linguae Italicae (Florence, 1638); Compendium facis linguae Italicae (1667).

He is author of the Rodamontate o bravate spagnole (Venice, 1627), the Dialoghi piacevoli (Venice, 1626), and of an important translation of Don Quixote, the first one in Italian: L'ingegnoso cittadino Don Chisciotte della Mancia (Venice, 1622, 1st part; 1625, 2nd part, 1625). "Navarrete says it is too much given to paraphrase, and it certainly takes liberties, but it is on the whole a fairly close translation. The verse is given in the original Spanish."
