= Heinrich Doergangk =

Heinrich Doergangk (Cologne, second half of the 16th century - before 1626) was a German Hispanist and grammarian.

An advocate of Roman Catholicism, he wrote a Spanish grammar in Latin titled Institutiones in linguam hispanicam, admodum faciles, quales antehac nunquam visae (Coloniae, 1614), where he attacks Protestantism.
