= Romance studies =

Academic discipline

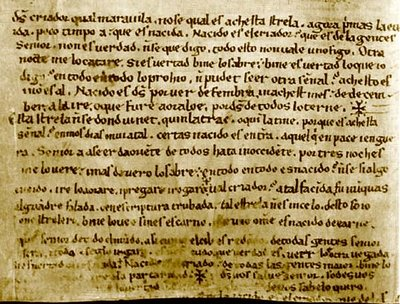
Example of Medieval text mixing Late Latin and early Romance features: the Auto de los Reyes Magos.

Romance studies or Romance philology (Aragonese: filolochía romanica; Catalan: filologia romànica; French: romanistique; Italian: filologia romanza; Portuguese: filologia romance; Romanian: romanistică; Spanish: filología románica) is an academic discipline that covers the study of the languages, literatures, and cultures of areas that speak Romance languages. Romance studies departments usually include the study of Italian, Spanish, Portuguese, and French. Additional areas of study include Romanian and Catalan, on one hand, and culture, history, and politics on the other hand.

Becoming proficient in Romance studies requires extensive specialized training focused on a thorough exploration of the histories of languages and literatures. This education includes detailed study in textual scholarship, paleography, and classical languages, which are core aspects of philological disciplines.

Because most places in Latin America speak a Romance language, Latin America is also studied in Romance studies departments. As a result, non-Romance languages in use in Latin America, such as Quechua and Guarani, are sometimes also taught in Romance studies departments.

Romance studies departments differ from single- or two-language departments in that they attempt to break down the barriers in scholarship among the various languages, through interdisciplinary or comparative work. These departments differ from Romance language departments in that they place a heavier emphasis on connections between language and literature, among others.

== Notable people ==
In 2015, Barbara De Marco, author of The Origins and Practice of Romance Philology explained that Yakov Malkiel, a Romance philologist, "takes determined steps to assure the future of studies in Romance philology; by 1946 he has secured the necessary institutional support to launch the journal Romance Philology".

== Journals and works ==
Romance Philology is an academic journal, founded with the goal of exploring the breadth and depth of Romance languages. It covers a wide range of topics including late Latin, medieval literatures of the Romance languages, historical and general linguistics, and textual criticism. The journal, recognized for its prestigious contributions to the study of linguistic history and medieval literature of the Romance languages, has built an international reputation since its inception. It is published bi-annually, with issues in the autumn and spring, featuring contributions from global experts in various languages. Recent editions have particularly focused on the evolution of Romance languages in the Americas.

== See also ==
- Hispanism
- Italian studies
- Latins

== Bibliography ==
- Ti Alkire & Carol Rosen, Romance Languages: A Historical Introduction. Cambridge: Cambridge UP, 2010.
- Michel Banniard, Du latin aux langues romanes. Paris: Armand Colin, 2005.
- Randall Scott Gess & Deborah Arteaga, eds. Historical Romance Linguistics: Retrospective and Perspectives. Amsterdam–Philadelphia: John Benjamins, 2006.
- Martin Harris & Nigel Vincent, eds., The Romance Languages. Oxford: Oxford UP, 1990; revised edn. Routledge, 2003.
- Günter Holtus, Michael Metzeltin, Christian Schmitt, eds., Lexikon der Romanistischen Linguistik (LRL). 12 vols. Tübingen: Niemeyer, 1988–2005.
- Petrea Lindenbauer, Michael Metzeltin, Margit Thir, Die romanischen Sprachen: Eine einführende Übersicht. Wilhelmsfeld: Egert, 1995.
- Michael Metzeltin, Gramática explicativa de la lengua castellana: De la sintaxis a la semántica. Vienna: Praesens, 2009.
- Michael Metzeltin, Erklärende Grammatik der romanischen Sprachen. Vienna: Praesens, 2010.
- Michael Metzeltin, Las lenguas románicas estándar: Historia de su formación y de su uso. Uviéu: Academia de la Llingua Asturiana, 2004, 300 pp. online version
- Rebecca Posner, The Romance Languages. Cambridge: Cambridge UP, 1996.
- Joseph B. Solodow, Latin Alive: The Survival of Latin in English and the Romance Languages. Cambridge: Cambridge UP, 2010.
- Lorenzo Renzi & Alvise Andreose, Manuale di linguistica e filologia romanza. Bologna: Il Mulino, 2006.
- Carlo Tagliavini, Le origini delle lingue neolatine. Bologna: Pàtron, 1979.
