= Miranda =

Miranda may refer to:

== People ==
- Miranda (given name), includes list of real and fictional people with given name Miranda
- Miranda (surname), includes list of people with surname Miranda
- Miranda (footballer, born 1947) (Deoclécio Manuel de Miranda), Brazilian footballer
- Miranda (footballer, born 1957) (Donizete Manuel Onofre), Brazilian footballer
- Miranda (footballer, born 1984) (João Miranda de Souza Filho), Brazilian footballer
- Miranda (footballer, born 1998) (Guilherme dos Santos Rodrigues), Brazilian footballer
- Miranda (footballer, born 2000) (Matheus dos Santos Miranda), Brazilian footballer
- Miranda Hart (born 1972), English comedian and actress, sometimes mononymously referred to as Miranda

== Law ==
- Miranda v. Arizona, an American legal case
- Miranda warning, an American police warning given to suspects about their rights, before they are interrogated

== Places ==
=== Australia ===
- Miranda, New South Wales
- Miranda railway station, New South Wales

=== Portugal ===
- Miranda do Corvo, a município in Coimbra District, Centro
- Miranda do Douro (parish), a freguesia in Bragança District, Norte
- Miranda do Douro, a município in Bragança District, Norte
- Terra de Miranda, a plateau in Bragança District, Norte

=== Spain ===
- Miranda (Avilés), a parish of Avilés, Asturias
- Belmonte de Miranda, Asturias
- Miranda de Arga, Navarre
- Miranda de Ebro, Castile and León
- Miranda de Duero, in Los Rábanos, in the province of Soria, Castile and León
- Miranda del Castañar, in the province of Salamanca, Castile and León

=== United States ===
- Miranda, California
- Miranda, South Dakota

=== Venezuela ===
- Miranda (state)
- Francisco de Miranda Municipality, Anzoátegui
- Francisco de Miranda, in Guárico
- Francisco de Miranda, in Táchira
- Miranda, Carabobo
- Miranda Municipality, Falcón
- Miranda Municipality, Mérida
- Miranda, in Trujillo
- Miranda, in Zulia

=== Other places ===
- Château Miranda, a former castle in Belgium
- Miranda, Mato Grosso do Sul, Brazil
- Miranda, Cauca, Colombia
- Güinía de Miranda, Cuba
- Miranda, Molise, Italy
- Miranda, New Zealand
- Plaza Miranda, Philippines

== Arts and entertainment ==
=== Films and television ===
- Miranda (1948 film), a film about a mermaid by English director Ken Annakin
- Miranda (1985 film), a film by Italian director Tinto Brass
- Miranda (2002 film), a film by British director Marc Munden
- Miranda (TV series), a British television comedy series
- Miranda, a country in the French film The Discreet Charm of the Bourgeoisie
- Miranda Sings, a television and social media comedy character portrayed by American comedian Colleen Ballinger

=== Literature ===
- Miranda (The Tempest), a character from the Shakespeare play The Tempest
- Miranda (novel), a novel by Polish writer Antoni Lange

=== Music ===
- "Miranda", a song by Phil Ochs on his 1967 album Pleasures of the Harbor
- Miranda!, an Argentine electropop band
- Miranda (group), a French Eurodance group with the frontwoman Sandra Miranda García
- Miranda (Colombian singer), Colombian singer, winner of La Voz Colombia
- Miranda (album), an album by Icelandic band Tappi Tíkarrass

== Organisations ==
- Miranda Camera Company, a Japanese camera manufacturer
- Miranda House, Delhi, a college for women at the University of Delhi, India
- Miranda Naturalists' Trust, a New Zealand conservation organisation

== Technology ==
- Miranda (programming language), a computer programming language
- Miranda (spacecraft), a British satellite in low Earth orbit
- VRSS-1, second Venezuelan satellite in low Earth orbit, named after Francisco de Miranda
- Miranda NG, a computer software instant messaging client based on Miranda IM
- Miranda (telecommunications company), regional mobile network operator in Russia

== Other uses ==
- Miranda station (Caracas), a station of on the Los Teques Metro line of the Caracas Metro in Venezuela
- Miranda station (Valencia), a metro station in Valencia
- Miranda (ship), two merchant ships
- HMS Miranda, three ships of the British Royal Navy
- Miranda (moon), a moon orbiting Uranus

== See also ==
- Miranda herba, a historic term for the carnivorous plant Nepenthes distillatoria
- Miranda cophinaria, an alternative name for spider Argiope aurantia
- Miranda II, a fictional spaceship in the Japanese television series Transformers: Energon
- Mirinda, a brand of soft drink
