= Miranda (given name) =

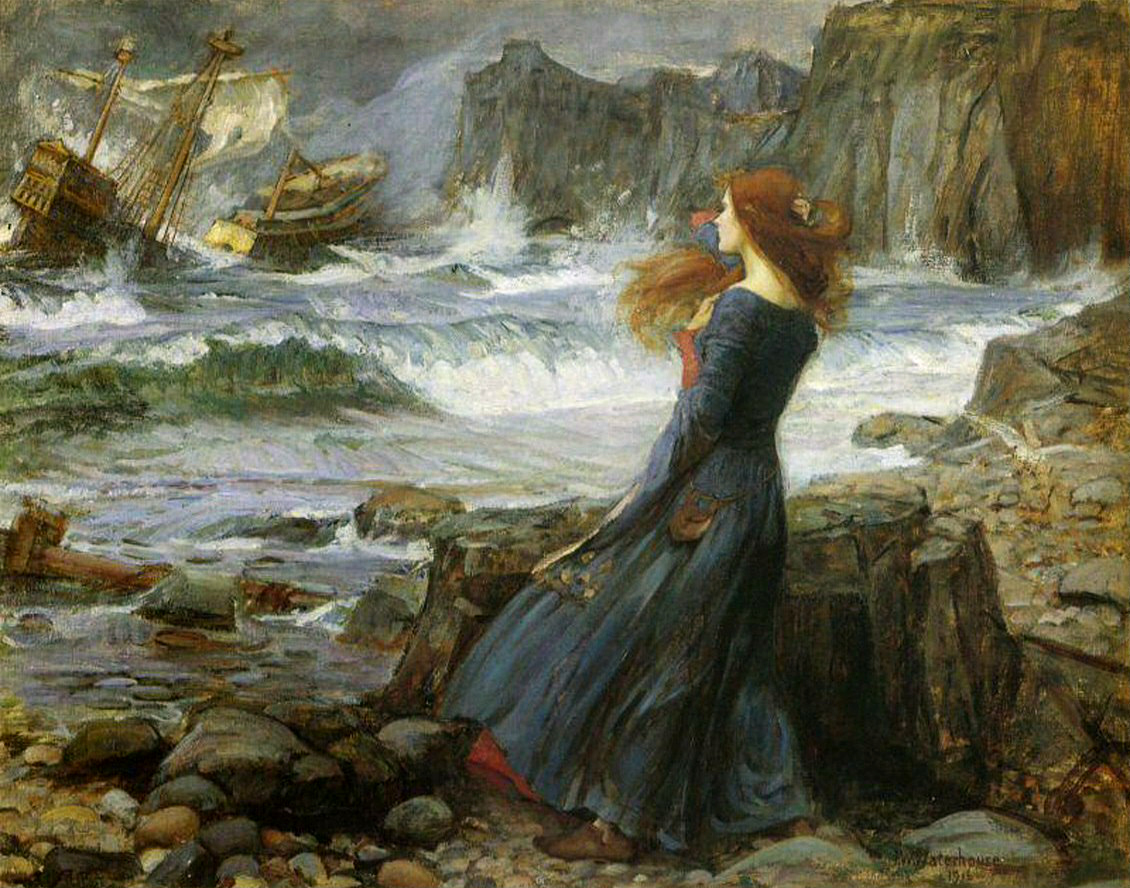
- Miranda from The Tempest by John William Waterhouse.
- Pronunciation: /mɪˈrændə/ mə-RAN-də
- Gender: Feminine

Origin
- Origin: Latin
- Meaning: "worthy of admiration"

Other names
- Variant form: Mirinda

Miranda is a feminine given name of Latin origin, meaning "worthy of admiration", deriving the feminine name from the Latin word mirandus. Although it existed as a surname prior, held by, for example, Giovanni Miranda (fl. 1566) and Juan Carreño de Miranda (born 1614), William Shakespeare originated use of the name as a forename for a character in his play The Tempest. In the play, the character is addressed as "Admired Miranda! Indeed the top of admiration! Worth what's dearest to the world!" People named their daughters after the Shakespearean character beginning in the 1700s. A moon of Uranus was also named after Miranda from the play. The name was more popular in the United States than elsewhere in the Anglosphere, possibly due to its similarity in sound to Amanda, a name also more common for American girls by the 1800s. The name declined in use after 1900 but was revived in the United Kingdom due to the popularity of the 1948 British fantasy film Miranda about a mermaid named Miranda. The name also increased in usage in the United States when the film began airing on television there in the 1950s. Other media influences also increased usage of the name through the early 2000s. The name has recently declined in usage in the United States due to negative associations with the satirical character Miranda Sings.

== Usage ==
The name has been well used in the Anglosphere since the 20th century. Usage of the name in the United States peaked during the 1990s, when it was among the 100 most popular names for American girls. It also peaked in usage in the 1990s or early years of the 21st century in countries such as Canada, the United Kingdom, Spain, and Sweden. It has also been well used in other Spanish speaking countries such as Mexico, where it was among the 100 most popular names for Mexican girls in 2020 and 2021.

== People ==
- Miranda (Colombian singer), Colombian singer
- Miranda (footballer, born 1947) (1947–2022), Brazilian footballer
- Miranda (footballer, born 1957), Brazilian footballer
- Miranda (footballer, born 1984), Brazilian footballer
- Miranda (footballer, born 1998), Brazilian footballer
- Miranda (footballer, born 2000), Brazilian footballer
- Miranda Aldhouse-Green (born 1947), British archaeologist and academic
- Miranda Ayim (born 1988), Canadian women's basketball player
- Miranda Bailey (producer) (born 1977), American film producer
- Miranda Bennett (born 1979), Australian rower
- Miranda Bergman (born 1947), American muralist
- Miranda Bodenhöfer (born 1990), Chilean ballet dancer
- Miranda Bonansea (1926–2019), Italian actress and voice actress
- Miranda Boonstra (born 1972), Dutch long-distance runner
- Miranda Brawn, British businesswoman, lawyer and philanthropist
- Miranda Campa (1914–1989), Swiss-born Italian actress and voice actress
- Miranda Carter (born 1965), British writer
- Miranda Cheng (born 1979), Taiwanese-born Dutch-educated mathematician and physicist
- Miranda Cicognani (1936–2025), Italian gymnast
- Miranda Coetzee (born 1997), South African athlete
- Miranda Connell (born 1938), British television presenter
- Miranda Cooper, English songwriter and singer
- Miranda Cosgrove (born 1993), American actress and producer
- Miranda Cowley Heller (born 1962), American author and TV developer
- Miranda Crispin, American actress
- Miranda Cromwell (born 1984), British theatre director
- Miranda de Pencier (born 1968), Canadian film and TV director
- Miranda de Souza Canavarro (1849–1933), American theosophist
- Miranda Dear, Australian film producer
- Miranda Devine (born 1961), Australian-American columnist and writer
- Miranda DiGrande (born 1997), German model and actress
- Miranda Dodson (born 1980), American musician
- Miranda Downes (1950–1985), Australian screenwriter
- Miranda Du (born 1969), American judge
- Miranda E. Shaw (born 1954), American author and scholar of Vajrayana Buddhism
- Miranda Easten, New Zealand country musician
- Miranda Esmonde-White (born 1949), Canadian fitness trainer
- Miranda Fricker (born 1966), English philosopher and feminist
- Miranda Frigon (born 1980), Canadian actor and songwriter
- Miranda Garrison, American actress
- Miranda Gas (born 1985), Spanish actress
- Miranda Giambelli (born 1992), Australian judoka
- Miranda Gibson (born 1982), Australian environmentalist
- Miranda Granger (born 1992), American mixed martial arts fighter
- Miranda Green (American journalist), American investigative journalist
- Miranda Greenstreet (born 1933), Ghanaian academic and educationist
- Miranda Grell (born 1978), British barrister and Labour councillor
- Miranda Guinness, Countess of Iveagh (1939–2010), Scottish aristocrat
- Miranda Harcourt (born 1962), New Zealand actress
- Miranda Hart (born 1972), English actress, comedian and writer
- Miranda Hill (1836–1910), English social reformer
- Miranda Horner, American game designer and editor
- Miranda Joseph, American academic and author
- Miranda July (born 1974), American artist
- Miranda Kalefi (born 1963), Albanian painter
- Miranda Kaufmann (born 1982), British historian, journalist and educator
- Miranda Kennedy (born 1975), American journalist and writer
- Miranda Kerr (born 1983), Australian model
- Miranda Khorava (born 1977), Georgian chess player
- Miranda Krestovnikoff (born 1973), English TV presenter, natural historian
- Miranda Kwok, Canadian screenwriter, television producer, and actress
- Miranda Lambert (born 1983), American country singer
- Miranda Lebrão (born 1989), Brazilian drag performer
- Miranda Lee (1945–2021), Australian writer
- Miranda Lee Richards (born 1975), American singer-songwriter
- Miranda Leek (born 1993), American archer
- Miranda Lichtenstein (born 1969), American photographer
- Miranda Lowe, British museum curator
- Miranda Lubbers (born 1973), Dutch social scientist
- Miranda Macmillan (1947–2020), British socialite and model
- Miranda Martino (born 1933), Italian singer and actress
- Miranda Massie (born 1966), American lawyer and exhibition curator
- Miranda Maverick (born 1997), American mixed martial artist
- Miranda Meeks, American illustrator
- Miranda Mellis, American author, novelist, and professor
- Miranda Melville (born 1989), American race walker
- Miranda Merron (born 1969), British sailor
- Miranda Mikadze (born 1989), Georgian chess player
- Miranda Miller (cyclist) (born 1990), Canadian downhill mountain biker
- Miranda Miller (novelist) (born 1950), English novelist
- Miranda Mirosa, New Zealand food science professor
- Miranda Mulholland, Canadian fiddle player and singer
- Miranda Nild (born 1997), Thai footballer
- Miranda Oakley (born 1984), American rock climber
- Miranda Oliveira, Brazilian footballer
- Miranda Otto (born 1967), Australian actress
- Miranda Parkes (born 1977), New Zealand artist and musician
- Miranda Patrucic, Investigative journalist
- Miranda Rae Mayo, American actress
- Miranda Raison (born 1977), British actress
- Miranda Ranieri (born 1986), Canadian squash player
- Miranda Richardson (born 1958), British actress
- Miranda Robertson (born 1945), Scientific editor
- Miranda Rosin (born c. 1995), Canadian politician
- Miranda Rumina (born 1959), Slovenian multimedia artist and writer
- Miranda Sawyer (born 1967), British journalist
- Miranda Seymour (born 1948), English critic, novelist and biographer
- Miranda Shearer (born 1982), British author
- Miranda Smith (born 1996), Canadian soccer player
- Miranda Solís (born 2008), Association football player
- Miranda Stevenson, Scottish zoologist and conservationist
- Miranda Stone, Canadian singer-songwriter
- Miranda Sykes (born 1978), English folk singer
- Miranda Tapsell (born 1987), Australian actress
- Miranda Tatari (born 1983), Croatian handball player
- Miranda Teboh-Ewungkem (born 1974), Cameroonian-American mathematician
- Miranda Threlfall-Holmes (born 1973), Anglican priest, archdeacon of Liverpool
- Miranda Throckmorton (born 1992), American sprint car driver
- Miranda Uhl (born 1992), American Paralympic swimmer
- Miranda Van Eetvelde (born 1959), Belgian politician
- Miranda Veljačić (born 1976), Croatian architect, researcher, cultural producer and editor
- Miranda Veringmeier (born 1992), Dutch cricketer
- Miranda Vidak, Croatian-American designer
- Miranda Vuolasranta (born 1959), Finnish Roma politician
- Miranda Wang (born 1994), Canadian tech entrepreneur
- Miranda Weese (born 1973 or 1974), American ballet dancer and ballet master
- Miranda Wilson (born 1960), American actress
- Miranda Wolpert (born 1962), British clinical psychologist and researcher
- Miranda Xafa, Greek economist
- Miranda Yap (1948–2015), Singaporean chemical engineer
- Miranda Yates (born 1963), Australian tennis player

== Fictional characters ==
- Princess Miranda, a character in the animated film Barbie: Princess Charm School
- Queen Miranda, mother to the title character in the animated series Sofia the First
- Miranda, the neighbor who is the owner of Blue's friend Magenta in Blue's Clues
- Miranda (The Tempest), in the play The Tempest by English writer William Shakespeare
- Miranda, the titular character of Miranda
- Miranda (Doctor Who), in the British novel series Eighth Doctor Adventures
- Miranda (W.I.T.C.H.), in the American television series W.I.T.C.H.
- Miranda, a character in the 1997 film Liar Liar
- Miranda Bailey, Chief of Surgery and attending general surgeon at Grey-Sloan Memorial Hospital in the American TV series Grey's Anatomy
- Miranda Collins, a character in Pretty Little Liars and later protagonist in Ravenswood
- Miranda Corneille, in the Canadian webcomic User Friendly
- Miranda Evans, in the British soap opera Doctors
- Miranda Feigelsteen, in the Canadian television series Mysterious Ways
- Miranda Goshawk, in the Harry Potter novel series by English author J. K. Rowling
- Miranda Hobbes, fictional TV series character in Sex and the City
- Miranda Jeffries, in the American film Chances Are
- Miranda Keyes, in the American video game series Halo
- Miranda Killgallen, in the American television series As Told By Ginger
- Miranda Lawson, fictional character in the Mass Effect video game series
- Miranda Lucas-Payne, in the sitcom Tyler Perry's House of Payne
- Miranda Montgomery, in the American television series All My Children
- Miranda Navas, in the 2017 film Wonder
- Miranda Parker, fictional character from the Australian soap opera Neighbours
- Miranda Priestly, fictional magazine editor in The Devil Wears Prada
- Miranda Sanchez, in the American television series Lizzie McGuire
- Miranda Sings, fictional character played by Colleen Ballinger
- Miranda Sommers-Gilbert, adopted mother to Elena in The Vampire Diaries
- Miranda Tate, played by Marion Cotillard in the 2012 film The Dark Knight Rises
- Miranda Wright, in the American television series Bonkers

== See also ==
- Miranda (disambiguation)
- Miranda (surname)
