= List of shipwrecks in September 1848 =

The list of shipwrecks in September 1848 includes ships sunk, foundered, wrecked, grounded, or otherwise lost during September 1848.

== 1 September ==
List of shipwrecks: 1 September 1848
Ship	State	Description
Arrow	United Kingdom	The brig was driven ashore in a typhoon at Cumsingmoon, China. Her crew were rescued.
Calder	United Kingdom	The brig was damaged in a typhoon off Macau, China. She was on a voyage from Hong Kong to London. She was subsequently towed back to Hong Kong.
Charles Wirgman	United States	The brig was driven ashore and wrecked in a typhoon at Hong Kong.
Clio	United Kingdom	The brig was wrecked in a typhoon in the "Typa" with the loss of most of her crew. She was on a voyage from Macau to Penang, Malaya.
Constant	United Kingdom	The barque was severely damaged in a typhoon off Hong Kong. She was on a voyage from Hong Kong to Liverpool, Lancashire. She put back to Hong Kong in a leaky condition.
Daniel Watson	United Kingdom	The brig was damaged in a typhoon at Hong Kong.
Dos Hermanos	Spain	The brig was driven into by Eliza Stewart (United Kingdom) and was damaged in a typhoon at Hong Kong.
Eagle	United Kingdom	The ship was driven into by Isabella Robertson (United Kingdom) during a typhoon at Cumsingmoon. She then collided with Norfolk and Sylph (United Kingdom) and was driven ashore. She was refloated the next day and taken in to Hong Kong, where she was condemned.
Eliza Stewart	United Kingdom	The ship was driven into by the barque John Laird (United Kingdom) in a typhoon at Hong Kong. She was driven into Dos Hermanos (Spain) and was severely damaged.
Helen Stewart	United Kingdom	The barque was driven ashore and wrecked on Green Island, Hong Kong in a typhoon.
Hermes	United Kingdom	The barque was driven ashore and severely damaged in a typhoon at Hong Kong. She was refloated.
Hindostan	United Kingdom	The full-rigged ship was severely damaged in a typhoon off Macao. She was on a voyage from Hong Kong to Shanghai, China. She was subsequently towed in to Hong Kong by the steamship Corsair (United Kingdom).
Isabella Moore	United Kingdom	The ship departed from Matanzas, Cuba for Cork. No further trace, presumed foundered with the loss of all hands.
Isabella Robertson	United Kingdom	The receiving ship was driven into Eagle (United Kingdom) and sank at Cumsingmoon in a typhoon with some loss of life. Five survivors were rescued the next day by USS Plymouth (United States Navy).
Island Queen	United Kingdom	The schooner was damaged in a typhoon at Hong Kong.
Jane and Margaret	United Kingdom	The ship departed from Königsberg, Prussia for Rotterdam, South Holland, Netherlands. No further trace, presumed foundered in the Baltic Sea with the loss of all hands.
Jane and Mary	United Kingdom	The ship departed from Pillau, Prussia for Amsterdam, North Holland, Netherlands. No further trace, presumed foundered with the loss of all hands.
Juliane	Bremen	The barque was damaged in a typhoon at Hong Kong.
Kien Heean	Netherlands	The full-rigged ship was driven ashore and wrecked in a typhoon at Shek O, China with the loss of all but three of her crew.
Ling	United Kingdom	The ship was driven ashore at Peveral Point, Dorset. She was on a voyage from Riga, Russia to Bridport, Dorset. She was refloated the next day and resumed her voyage.
Norfolk	United Kingdom	The ship was driven into by Eagle in a typhoon at Cumsingmoon and was damaged.
Pilote	France	The lugger was driven ashore at South Shields, County Durham, United Kingdom.
Prince Albert	United Kingdom	The ship was severely damaged in a typhoon whilst on a voyage from China to Singapore. She arrived at Singapore on 25 September and was placed under repair.
Salopian	United Kingdom	The barque was driven out to sea and dismasted off Green Island in a typhoon. She was subsequently towed in to Hong Kong.
San F. Xavier	Portugal	The schooner was driven ashore and wrecked in a typhoon at Hong Kong.
Sarah Crisp	United Kingdom	The ship caught fire and capsized in the South China Sea (16°30′N 114°30′E) with the loss of thirteen of her crew. Survivors were rescued after 24 days on the wreck by the schooner Emma Sheratt ( (United Kingdom of Great Britain and Ireland) Swan River Colony). Sarah Crisp was on a voyage from Moulmein, Burma to Hong Kong.
Sharon	United Kingdom	The ship departed from Havana, Cuba for Cork. No further trace, presumed foundered with the loss of all hands.
Sir Edward	United Kingdom	The ship was wrecked on the Pentland Skerries. Her crew were rescued. She was on a voyage from Liverpool, Lancashire to a Baltic port.
Sylph	United Kingdom	The ship was driven into by Isabella Robertson (United Kingdom) and was driven ashore at Cumsingmoon in a typhoon. She was refloated the next day.
Traveller	United Kingdom	The smack capsized at Brixham, Devon. She was on a voyage from Plymouth to Brixham and Teignmouth.

== 2 September ==
List of shipwrecks: 2 September 1848
Ship	State	Description
City of Sydney	(United Kingdom of Great Britain and Ireland) New South Wales	The ship sank in a squall at Melbourne. She was on a voyage from Melbourne to Launceston, Van Diemen's Land.
Elizabeth Taylerson	United Kingdom	The snow ran aground on the Middle Sand, in the North Sea off the coast of Essex. She was on a voyage from South Shields, County Durham to London. She was refloated but consequently had to be beached on the Maplin Sand. Subsequently refloated and taken in to Wivenhoe, Essex for repairs.
Emilie	Denmark	The ship ran aground off Sprogø. She was on a voyage from Liverpool, Lancashire, United Kingdom to Bandholm.
Havana Packet	United Kingdom	The ship departed from Matanzas, Cuba for Cork. No further trace, presumed foundered with the loss of all hands.
Lahore	United Kingdom	The ship departed from Matanzas for Cork. No further trace, presumed foundered with the loss of all hands.
Matilda	(United Kingdom of Great Britain and Ireland) Van Diemen's Land	The schooner was driven ashore and wrecked on Babel Island. Her crew were rescued by John Bull ( (United Kingdom of Great Britain and Ireland) New South Wales) She was on a voyage from Hobart to Babel Island.
Olinda	United Kingdom	The ship was wrecked on the Tijoca Shoals, at the mouth of the Pará River. Her crew were rescued.
Pedlar	(United Kingdom of Great Britain and Ireland) New South Wales	The schooner was wrecked in the Bass Strait. She was on a voyage from Melbourn to Port Albert.

== 3 September ==
List of shipwrecks: 3 September 1848
Ship	State	Description
Haabet	Denmark	The ship ran aground off Fjaltring. Her crew were rescued. She was on a voyage from London, United Kingdom to Aalborg.
Henriette	Denmark	The ship was driven ashore and wrecked at Hvidborg. Her crew were rescued. She was on a voyage from Hull, Yorkshire to a Norwegian port.
HMS Hound	Royal Navy	The Alert-class brig-sloop ran aground at Havana, Cuba.
Itenerant	United Kingdom	The brig ran aground on the Gunfleet Sand, in the North Sea off the coast of Essex.
Jules	United Kingdom	The sloop ran aground on the Goodwin Sands, Kent, United Kingdom. She was on a voyage from Sunderland, County Durham, United Kingdom to Havre de Grâce, Seine-Inférieure. She was refloated and resumed her voyage.
Kingston	United Kingdom	The brig ran aground off Naissaar, Russia. She was on a voyage from Saint Petersburg to Liverpool, Lancashire.
Mary Hibbert	(United Kingdom of Great Britain and Ireland) Bermuda	The ship was abandoned in the Atlantic Ocean. Her crew were rescued by Tigris (United States). Mary Hibbert was on a voyage from Bermuda to Saint Stephen, New Brunswick, British North America.
Royal Frederick	United Kingdom	The sloop was driven ashore at Cromer, Norfolk. She was refloated and resumed her voyage.
Tennent	United Kingdom	The brig ran aground on the Gunfleet Sand, in the North Sea off the coast of Essex. She was refloated.
Victoria	United Kingdom	The sloop was wrecked on the Holms of Reeve Island, off Sanda. Her crew were rescued. She was on a voyage from Liverpool, Lancashire to Lerwick, Shetland Islands.
Waterwitch	(United Kingdom of Great Britain and Ireland) Jersey	The schooner was wrecked in the Strait of Belle Isle. Her crew were rescued.

== 4 September ==
List of shipwrecks: 4 September 1848
Ship	State	Description
Endeavour	United Kingdom	The ship was abandoned in the Irish Sea off Bally Gally Head, County Antrim. Her crew were rescued. She was on a voyage from Ardrossan, Ayrshire to Dundalk, County Louth.
Hermann	United States	The paddle steamer was driven ashore in Gurnard Bay. She was on a voyage from New York to Bremen. She was refloated and resumed her voyage.
Orlando	United Kingdom	The ship was driven ashore north of Whitehill Point, County Durham. She was refloated.
Rosebud	United Kingdom	The schooner foundered in the North Sea. Her crew were rescued by the schooner Meyer ( (Denmark) Duchy of Schleswig).
Thirsk Packet	United Kingdom	The ship was run down and sunk in the North Sea off Staithes, Yorkshire by a collier. Her crew survived.
William Hinch	United Kingdom	The ship was abandoned in the Atlantic Ocean. Her crew were rescued by Albion (United Kingdom). William Hinch was on a voyage from Saint John, New Brunswick, British North America to Cork.

== 5 September ==
List of shipwrecks: 5 September 1848
Ship	State	Description
Alert	United Kingdom	The ship was driven ashore in the Sea of Marmora near "Schardak". She was refloated and resumed her voyage.
Exertion	United Kingdom	The ship was driven ashore at Trelleborg, Sweden. She was refloated and taken in to Ystad, Sweden in a waterlogged condition.
Handiana	United Kingdom	The ship foundered off Calcutta, India.
James and Jessy	United Kingdom	The smack was wrecked at St. John's Point, County Donegal. Her crew were rescued. She was on a voyage from Liverpool, Lancashire to Baltimore, County Cork.
San Roman	Mexico	The brig was abandoned in the Atlantic Ocean. Her crew were rescued by Hannah Sprague (United Kingdom) San Roman was on a voyage from Laguna to Liverpool.

== 6 September ==
List of shipwrecks: 6 September 1848
Ship	State	Description
Henry	(United Kingdom of Great Britain and Ireland) New South Wales	The brig was wrecked near Georgetown, Van Diemen's Land. All on board were rescued. She was on a voyage from Launceston, Van Diemen's Land to Adelaide, South Australia.
Thirsk Packet	United Kingdom	The ship collided with a collier and sank in the North Sea off Staithes, Yorkshire. Her crew were rescued. She was on a voyage from London to South Shields, County Durham.

== 7 September ==
List of shipwrecks: 7 September 1848
Ship	State	Description
Elizabeth	United Kingdom	The sloop was driven ashore at Montrose, Forfarshire. She was on a voyage from Peterhead, Aberdeenshire to Leith, Lothian. She was refloated and taken in to Montrose.

== 8 September ==
List of shipwrecks: 8 September 1848
Ship	State	Description
Augusta	United Kingdom	The ship was destroyed by fire at San Antonio, Cape Verde Islands. She was on a voyage from Hull, Yorkshire to Coquimbo, Chile.
Mallard	United Kingdom	The ship ran aground on the Boulmer Rocks, on the coast of Northumberland. She was refloated and taken in to Warkworth, Northumberland in a waterlogged condition.

== 9 September ==
List of shipwrecks: 9 September 1848
Ship	State	Description
Liefdadigheid	Netherlands	The ship was wrecked near Höganäs, Sweden with the loss of three of her crew. She was on a voyage from Cardiff, Glamorgan, United Kingdom to Kronstadt, Russia.
Planter	United Kingdom	The ship was wrecked on the Anholt Reef, in the Baltic Sea. Her crew were rescued. She was on a voyage from Saint Petersburg, Russia to Lowestoft, Suffolk.
Regina	United Kingdom	The ship was driven ashore at "Stevens", Denmark. She was on a voyage from Riga, Russia to London. She was refloated and put in to Helsingør, Denmark in a leaky condition.
Young Hebe	(United Kingdom of Great Britain and Ireland) New South Wales	The schooner ran aground in Oyster Bay.

== 10 September ==
List of shipwrecks: 10 September 1848
Ship	State	Description
Argo	United Kingdom	The ship was driven ashore north of Tønning, Duchy of Holstein. She was on a voyage from Sunderland, County Durham to London.
Earl of Bathurst	United Kingdom	The ship was wrecked on Stoneskar, Russia with the loss of three of her five crew. She was on a voyage from Saint Petersburg, Russia to Helsingør, Denmark.
I'll Try	United Kingdom	The schooner ran aground and was wrecked on St. John's Point, in the Pentland Firth. Her crew were rescued. She was on a voyage from Liverpool, Lancashire to Stralsund.
Lamont	United Kingdom	The ship was driven ashore and wrecked on Saaremaa, Russia. Her crew were rescued. She was on a voyage from Hull, Yorkshire to Saint Petersburg, Russia. She was later refloated and resumed her voyage.
Martin Luther	United Kingdom	The ship struck the Black Rock and was damaged. She was on a voyage from Odesa to Falmouth, Cornwall. She was taken in to the Carrick Roads in a waterlogged condition.
Thor	(Russian Empire) Grand Duchy of Finland	The ship was wrecked near Morup, Sweden. Her crew were rescued. She was on a voyage from Liverpool to Oulu.

== 11 September ==
List of shipwrecks: 11 September 1848
Ship	State	Description
Alert	United Kingdom	The ship was beached on the coast of County Wexford. She was on a voyage from Wexford to Gloucester.
John Geddie	United Kingdom	The ship ran aground on Stoneskar, Russia and was wrecked. Her crew survived. She was on a voyage from Liverpool, Lancashire to Saint Petersburg, Russia.
Louisa	France	The schooner ran aground on the Foreness Rock, off the coast of Kent, United Kingdom and sank. Her crew were rescued. She was on a voyage from Dunkirk, Nord to London, United Kingdom. She was refloated on 13 September and towed in to Margate, Kent.
Reliance	United Kingdom	The ship ran aground on the Inner Gabbard Sand, in the North Sea. She was on a voyage from Newcastle upon Tyne, Northumberland to Liverpool, Lancashire. She was refloated and put in to Great Yarmouth, Norfolk in a leaky condition.

== 12 September ==
List of shipwrecks: 12 September 1848
Ship	State	Description
Belle Isle	United Kingdom	The ship was wrecked on Reef Head, in the Hooghly River with the loss of a crew member. The surviving crew and her passengers were rescued. She was on a voyage from Glasgow, Renfrewshire to Calcutta, India.
John Wood	United Kingdom	The ship was wrecked between False Point and Palmyras Point, India. Her crew were rescued. She was on a voyage from Calcutta, India to Mauritius.
Nautilus	United Kingdom	The ship capsized off Saint John, New Brunswick, British North America. Her crew were rescued by Commodore (United Kingdom). Nautilus was on a voyage from Boston, Massachusetts, United States to Windsor, Nova Scotia, British North America.

== 13 September ==
List of shipwrecks: 13 September 1848
Ship	State	Description
Anna Sophia	Duchy of Holstein	The ship ran aground on a reef north east of Skagen, Denmark. She was on a voyage from Liverpool, Lancashire, United Kingdom to Neustadt in Holstein. She was refloated and resumed her voyage.
Blessing	United Kingdom	The ship ran aground off Osmussaar, Russia. She was on a voyage from Sunderland, County Durham to Saint Petersburg. She was later refloated and put in to Kronstadt, Russia in a leaky condition.
Enchantress	(United Kingdom of Great Britain and Ireland) British North America	The ship was wrecked on St. Paul's Island, Nova Scotia. Her crew were rescued.
Henry	United Kingdom	The ship ran aground and was severely damaged at Tampico, Mexico. She was on a voyage from Genoa, Kingdom of Sardinia to Tampico. She was refloated and taken into Tampico, where she was condemned.

== 14 September ==
List of shipwrecks: 14 September 1848
Ship	State	Description
Cervantes	United States	The ship sprang a leak and was abandoned in the Atlantic Ocean. Her crew were rescued by Hermoine (Bremen). Cervantes was on a voyage from Genoa, Kingdom of Sardinia to Boston, Massachusetts.
Isadora	United Kingdom	The ship was driven ashore at Hamra, Gotland, Sweden. She was on a voyage from Warkworth, Northumberland to Saint Petersburg, Russia. She was refloated the next day and taken in to Slitohamn for repairs.
Richard Brandt	Russia	The ship was lost in the White Sea. Her crew were rescued. She was on a voyage from Saint Petersburg to Arkhangelsk.
Rose	United Kingdom	The ship was driven ashore at Newport, Monmouthshire. She was on a voyage from Quebec City, Province of Canada, British North America to Newport.

== 15 September ==
List of shipwrecks: 15 September 1848
Ship	State	Description
Alice	(United Kingdom of Great Britain and Ireland) New South Wales	The schooner was lost near Sydney. Her crew were rescued. She was on a voyage from Circular Head to Sydney.
Dykes	United Kingdom	The ship was wrecked on Cape Breton Island, Nova Scotia, British North America.
HMS Reynard	Royal Navy	The sloop of war ran aground at Cobh, County Cork. She was refloated.

== 16 September ==
List of shipwrecks: 16 September 1848
Ship	State	Description
Hansine	United States	The ship was wrecked near Maceió, Brazil. She was on a voyage from Buenos Aires, Argentina to Boston, Massachusetts.
Montgomery	United States	The barque was abandoned in the Atlantic Ocean. Her crew were rescued on 20 September by Elijah Swift (United States).
Robert Lindsay	United Kingdom	The ship sprang a leak and made from Rodrigues, Mauritius, where she was wrecked. Her crew were rescued. She was on a voyage from Moulmein, Burma to Cork.
Rokeby	United Kingdom	The ship departed from New York, United States for South Shields, County Durham. No further trace, presumed foundered with the loss of all hands. Also reported as having been on a voyage from South Shields to New York.

== 17 September ==
List of shipwrecks: 17 September 1848
Ship	State	Description
California	United States	The ship ran aground on the Pelting Rocks, in the Gulf of Finland. She was on a voyage from Vyborg, Grand Duchy of Finland to Bordeaux, Gironde, France. She was refloated and towed in to Helsinki, Grand Duchy of Finland in a waterlogged condition.
Letizia	Kingdom of the Two Sicilies	The ship sprang a leak and was consequently beached east of Almería, Spain. She was on a voyage from Newcastle upon Tyne, Northumberland, United Kingdom to Naples. She was refloated and taken in to Almería for repairs.
Numa	United Kingdom	The brig capsized at Sunderland, County Durham.
Unity	United Kingdom	The steamship was wrecked near Killala, County Mayo. Her crew were rescued.
Wellington	United Kingdom	The ship ran aground on the English Bank, in the River Plate and was abandoned by her crew. She was on a voyage from Bristol, Gloucestershire to Valparaíso, Chile. She floated off and was taken in to Montevideo, Uruguay.

== 18 September ==
List of shipwrecks: 18 September 1848
Ship	State	Description
Camilla	United Kingdom	The ship ran aground off Rønne, Denmark. She was on a voyage from Saint Petersburg, Russia to Dartmouth, Devon. She was refloated and resumed her voyage.
Lady Echo	(United Kingdom of Great Britain and Ireland) British North America	The schooner was wrecked on Cape Sable Island, Nova Scotia. Her crew were rescued.
Peel's One, and Valeria	United Kingdom (United Kingdom of Great Britain and Ireland) British North America	The ships were in collision and Valeria sank. Her crew were rescued by Peel's One, which subsequently came ashore at Cape North, Nova Scotia, British North America with the loss of fourteen lives. Peel's One was on a voyage from Hull, Yorkshire or Liverpool, Lancashire to Richibucto, New Brunswick, British North America. Valeria was on a voyage from a port in Newfoundland to Pictou, Nova Scotia.
Three Brothers	United Kingdom	The ship caught fire in Carnarvon Bay and was scuttled. She was on a voyage from Caernarfon to Gloucester.

== 19 September ==
List of shipwrecks: 19 September 1848
Ship	State	Description
Britannia	United Kingdom	The ship ran aground on the Kentish Knock. She was on a voyage from South Shields, County Durham to Naples, Kingdom of the Two Sicilies. She was abandoned the next day.
Sapphire	United Kingdom	The barque was driven ashore in the Scheldt at Lillo, Antwerp, Belgium. She was on a voyage from Antwerp to Liverpool, Lancashire. She was refloated.
Sylvia	United Kingdom	The brig was abandoned in the Atlantic Ocean 60 nautical miles (110 km) off Cape Ann, Massachusetts, United States. Her crew were rescued.

== 20 September ==
List of shipwrecks: 20 September 1848
Ship	State	Description
Industry	(United Kingdom of Great Britain and Ireland) New South Wales	The cutter was wrecked on Locklan's Island.
Margaret	United Kingdom	The ship was wrecked on Rock Angus, in Strangford Lough. Her crew were rescued. She was on a voyage from Liverpool, Lancashire to Belfast, County Antrim.
Mary Ann	United Kingdom	The ship foundered in the Bristol Channel off Lundy Island, Devon. Her crew were rescued. She was on a voyage from Whitehaven, Cumberland to Cardiff, Glamorgan.

== 21 September ==
List of shipwrecks: 21 September 1848
Ship	State	Description
Albion	United Kingdom	The ship ran aground at Liverpool, Lancashire. She was on a voyage from Liverpool to Stettin.
Eleanor Elise	Bremen	The brig was driven ashore and wrecked at Long Branch, New Jersey, United States. She was on a voyage from Savannah, Georgia, United States to the River Plate.
Honora	United Kingdom	The ship ran aground off the coast of Gotland, Sweden. She was on a voyage from Saint Petersburg, Russia to Bristol, Gloucestershire. She was refloated the next day and resumed her voyage.
Industry	United Kingdom	The ship was driven ashore and severely damaged at Laxey, Isle of Man. Her crew were rescued. She was on a voyage from Douglas, Isle of Man to Workington, Cumberland.
Jane and Dorothy	United Kingdom	The ship was in collision with a sloop and was consequently beached. She was refloated and assisted in to Great Yarmouth, Norfolk.
William Bayley	United Kingdom	The ship ran aground on the Half Ebb Rock, off Harwich, Essex. She was on a voyage from Newcastle upon Tyne, Northumberland to Malta. She was refloated.
William Kennedy	United Kingdom	The ship was driven ashore at Gaspé, Province of Canada, British North America. She was on a voyage from Liverpool to Gaspé. She was refloated and taken in to Gaspé for repairs.

== 22 September ==
List of shipwrecks: 22 September 1848
Ship	State	Description
Adolphine	Wismar	The brig ran aground on the Gunfleet Sand, in the North Sea off the coast of Essex, United Kingdom. She was refloated but then ran aground and capsized on the Halliday Flats. Her crew were rescued.
Captain Ross	United Kingdom	The barque was destroyed by fire at Port Maria, Jamaica.
Corinth	Netherlands	The ship ran aground on the Pampus, in the North Sea off the coast of Zeeland. She was on a voyage from Havana, Cuba to Hellevoetsluis, Zeeland. She was refloated on 24 September.
Don	United Kingdom	The ship was wrecked on North Cape, Prince Edward Island, British North America. Her crew were rescued. She was on a voyage from Waterford to Miramichi, New Brunswick, British North America.
Francis	United Kingdom	The ship ran aground on a sunken wreck at Kronstadt, Russia. She was refloated on 24 September and taken in to Kronstadt.
New England	United States	The ship was abandoned in the Atlantic Ocean. Her crew were rescued by Kitty (United Kingdom). New England was on a voyage from Liverpool, Lancashire, United Kingdom to Boston, Massachusetts.
Nimrod	Hamburg	The ship ran aground on the Newarp Sand, in the North Sea. She was refloated and put in to Harwich, Essex in a leaky condition.

== 23 September ==
List of shipwrecks: 23 September 1848
Ship	State	Description
Ann	United Kingdom	The schooner was in collision with Hampton (flag unknown) off Anticosti Island, Nova Scotia, British North America and was abandoned. Her crew abandoned ship and were rescued by Hampton. Her 104 passengers were rescued the next day by Princess Royal (United Kingdom). Ann was on a voyage from Limerick to Quebec City, Province of Canada, British North America.
Favourite	France	The ship struck rocks at Blyth, Northumberland. United Kingdom and was wrecked.
Florence	United Kingdom	The ship was wrecked on Cape Rosier, Maine, United States. Her crew were rescued. She was on a voyage from Southampton, Hampshire to Quebec City, Province of Canada, British North America.
Horatio	United Kingdom	The ship was wrecked in Griffin Cove. Her crew were rescued. She was on a voyage from London to Quebec City.
Midge	(United Kingdom of Great Britain and Ireland) New South Wales	The schooner ran aground in Oyster Bay.
Spalpeen	(United Kingdom of Great Britain and Ireland) British North America	The ship was wrecked on Cape Rosier. Her crew were rescued.

== 24 September ==
List of shipwrecks: 24 September 1848
Ship	State	Description
Agnes	United Kingdom	The Humber Keel was driven ashore and wrecked near Scarborough, Yorkshire with the loss of all three crew. She was on a voyage from Sunderland, County Durham to Hull, Yorkshire.
Amelia	United Kingdom	The ship struck sunken wreck off Dimlington, Yorkshire and consequently sank 2 nautical miles (3.7 km) off Bridlington. Her crew were rescued by the Bridlington Lifeboat. She was on a voyage from South Shields, County Durham to Chatham and Faversham, Kent.
Betty	United Kingdom	The schooner ran aground on the Cork Sand, in the North Sea off the coast of Essex, and sank. Her crew were rescued. She was on a voyage from Port Madoc, Caernarfonshire to Woodbridge, Suffolk.
Johnson	United Kingdom	The ship ran aground on the Sheringham Shoal, in the North Sea off the coast of Norfolk. She was refloated but consequently sank. Her crew survived.
Margaret Scott	United Kingdom	The brig was driven ashore and wrecked at Dunbeath, Caithness.
Peggy	United Kingdom	The smack ran aground on the Salthouse Bank, in the Irish Sea off the coast of Lancashire and was abandoned. She was on a voyage from Lytham St. Annes, Lancashire to Cemaes, Anglesey.
Sally	United Kingdom	The ship was driven ashore and wrecked at Caister-on-Sea, Norfolk. She was on a voyage from Great Yarmouth, Norfolk to Newcastle upon Tyne, Northumberland.
Speculator	United Kingdom	The ship was wrecked near "Lorraine", Nova Scotia, British North America. Her crew were rescued. She was on a voyage from Exeter, Devon to Restigouche, New Brunswick, British North America.
Villa Nova	United Kingdom	The ship ran aground on the Haisborough Sands, in the North sEa off the coast of Norfolk and was abandoned by her crew. She was on a voyage from Kronstadt, Russia to Bristol, Gloucestershire.

== 25 September ==
List of shipwrecks: 25 September 1848
Ship	State	Description
Achilles	United Kingdom	The ship ran aground on the Maplin Sand, in the North Sea off the coast of Essex.
Jacmel Packet	Haiti	The ship was wrecked on Bird Rock, off the Attwood Cay. She was on a voyage from Jacmel to Hamburg.
Jupiter	Danzig	The ship was driven ashore at Hela, Prussia. She was on a voyage from Danzig to Plymouth, Devon, United Kingdom. She was refloated on 9 October and put back to Danzig.
Ocean Bride	United Kingdom	The ship capsized in the Atlantic Ocean with the loss of five of her eleven crew. Five survivors were rescued on 30 September by the barque USS Electra (United States Navy). Ocean Bride was on a voyage from Laguna, British Honduras to London.
Regina	United Kingdom	The barque was abandoned in the Atlantic Ocean. Her crew were rescued by John Dunlop (United Kingdom). Regina was on a voyage from Antigua to London.
Robert and Helen	United Kingdom	The ship ran aground in the Belfast Lough. She was on a voyage from Glasgow, Renfrewshire to Belfast, County Antrim. She was refloated and taken in to Belfast.
Sara and Maria	Netherlands	The ship ran aground on the Owers Sandbank, in the English Channel off the coast of Sussex, United Kingdom. She was on a voyage from Amsterdam, North Holland to Batavia, Netherlands East Indies. She was refloated with the assistance of a pilot boat form Selsey and taken in to Portsmouth, Hampshire, United Kingdom.
William Pitt	United Kingdom	The smack was in collision with John Cornell (United Kingdom) and was presumed to have foundered in the English Channel off the coast of Sussex with the loss of all hands.

== 26 September ==
List of shipwrecks: 26 September 1848
Ship	State	Description
Britannia	United Kingdom	The brig ran aground on the Abertay Sands, off Dundee, Forfarshire and was damaged. She was refloated in a leaky condition.
Enterprise	United Kingdom	The ship was wrecked at Arendal, Norway. She was on a voyage from Danzig to Liverpool, Lancashire.
Ganges	United Kingdom	The ship foundered in the Atlantic Ocean. Her crew were rescued by Edwin (Belgium). Ganges was on a voyage from British Honduras to London.
Sarah	United Kingdom	The ship was discovered in a sinking condition off the Point of Ayr, Cheshire. She was taken in to Rhyl, Denbighshire.
Tigress	United Kingdom	The brig was driven ashore and wrecked near the mouth of the Onkaparinga River with the loss of two lives. She was on a voyage from Leith, Lothian to Adelaide, South Australia.

== 27 September ==
List of shipwrecks: 27 September 1848
Ship	State	Description
Eline Catherine	United Kingdom/.	The ship ran aground at North Shields, County Durham, United Kingdom. She was on a voyage from Dram to North Shields. She was refloated and towed in to South Shields in a leaky condition.
Emu Packet	(United Kingdom of Great Britain and Ireland) New South Wales	The ship was driven ashore and wrecked in Emu Bay.
Free	United Kingdom	The brig was in collision with the schooner Flora (United Kingdom) and was consequently beached at Ferryden by Montrose, Forfarshire. She was refloated.
Harriet	(United Kingdom of Great Britain and Ireland) British North America	The ship was driven ashore near "Abrea". She was on a voyage from Halifax, Nova Scotia to Havana, Cuba.
Isabella	United Kingdom	The brig was driven ashore at South Foreland, Kent. She was on a voyage from Sunderland, County Durham to Dover, Kent. She was refloated and taken in The Downs.
Loyan	United States	The brig was abandoned in the Atlantic Ocean. Her crew were rescued on 2 October by Fama Habanera (Spain).
Trial	(United Kingdom of Great Britain and Ireland) New South Wales	The sloop was driven ashore and wrecked in Emu Bay.

== 28 September ==
List of shipwrecks: 28 September 1848
Ship	State	Description
Atlantic	United Kingdom	The ship was wrecked near "Querpoon", British North America the loss of one life. She was on a voyage from Leith, Lothian to Quebec City, Province of Canada, British North America.
Carmalita	United States	The barque was abandoned in the Atlantic Ocean (37°12′N 52°43′E). Twelve people were rescued by the barque Castrus (United Kingdom). Carmalita was on a voyage from Faial Island, Azores to Boston, Massachusetts.
Diamond	(United Kingdom of Great Britain and Ireland) British North America	The barque was in collision with Arab (United Kingdom) and foundered in the Atlantic Ocean off Cape Sable Island, Nova Scotia. Her crew were rescued by Arab. Diamond was on a voyage from Demerara, British Honduras to Liverpool, Nova Scotia.
Emmeline	(United Kingdom of Great Britain and Ireland) British North America	The ship was wrecked at Cape Race, Newfoundland. She was on a voyage from New Orleans, Louisiana, United States to Liverpool, Lancashire.
Jockey	United Kingdom	The schooner was abandoned in the Atlantic Ocean. Two of her eight crew were rescued by the brig Activo (Netherlands), one was lost when their boat collided with Activo. The schooner then foundered with the loss of two of her crew, the three survivors took to a boat. Only one survived to be rescued on 4 October by the schooner Annie (United Kingdom). Jockey was on a voyage from Constantinople, Ottoman Empire to Leith, Lothian.
Justitia	(United Kingdom of Great Britain and Ireland) Cape Colony	The schooner was driven ashore and wrecked in Waterloo Bay. Her crew were rescued.
Merchant	United States	The full-rigged ship was in collision with Marquis of Bute (United Kingdom) and foundered in the Atlantic Ocean. Her crew were rescued by Marquis of Bute.

== 29 September ==
List of shipwrecks: 29 September 1848
Ship	State	Description
Buen Mozo	Spain	The ship struck the Diamante Rock and was holed. She was on a voyage from Cádiz to the Canary Islands. She was taken in to Cádiz in a sinking condition.
Caroline	United Kingdom	The ship was wrecked on the Seven Stones Reef with the loss of a crew member. She was on a voyage from Newport, Monmouthshire to Barcelona, Spain.
Clarinda	United Kingdom	The brig was driven ashore at Brancaster, Norfolk. She was refloated on 10 October.
Eleanor	United Kingdom	The brig ran aground and was wrecked on the Gunfleet Sand, in the North Sea off the coast of Essex. Her crew were rescued. She was on a voyage from Hartlepool, County Durham to London.
Fortuna	United Kingdom	The ship was driven ashore and wrecked on Bornholm, Denmark. Her crew were rescued. She was on a voyage from Königsberg, Prussia to London.
Jane	United Kingdom	The brig was in collision with the brig Dolphin (United Kingdom) and sank south east of Harwich, Essex. Her crew were rescued by Dolphin. Jane was on a voyage from Sunderland, County Durham to London.
Mervid	United Kingdom	The ship was damaged at North Shields, County Durham by the explosion of gas in her cargo of coal. A crew member was seriously injured.
Prince Albert	United Kingdom	The steamship was in collision with the steamship Queen (United Kingdom) in the River Mersey and was consequently beached on the Cheshire bank and broke her back.

== 30 September ==
List of shipwrecks: 30 September 1848
Ship	State	Description
Caroline	United Kingdom	The schooner was wrecked on the Seven Stones Reef with the loss of six of her seven crew. She was on a voyage from Newport, Monmouthshire to Tarragona, Spain.
Catherine	Flag unknown	The ship was driven ashore on Bornholm, Denmark. All on board were rescued. She was on a voyage from Königsberg, Prussia to London, United Kingdom.
John Bolton	United Kingdom	The ship was abandoned off Cape Race, Newfoundland, British North America. Her crew were rescued.
Junge Marianne	Denmark	The ship sank in the North Sea. Her crew were rescued by Twende Familien ( Stettin). Junge Marianne was on a voyage from Horsens to Hull, Yorkshire, United Kingdom.
Lord Douglas	United Kingdom	The ship was driven ashore at Bridlingdon, East Riding of Yorkshire. She was on a voyage from Stettin to London. She was refloated on 3 October.
Louis Desirée	France	The ship was driven ashore and wrecked at Mumby, Lincolnshire, United Kingdom. Her crew were rescued. She was on a voyage from Blyth, Northumberland, United Kingdom to Rouen, Seine-Inférieure.
Michelet	Danzig	The ship ran aground and was damaged at Danzig. She was on a voyage from Danzig to Grimsby, Lincolnshire, United Kingdom. She was refloated and put back to Danzig for repairs.

== Unknown date ==
List of shipwrecks: Unknown date in September 1848
Ship	State	Description
Annechina Lucia	Prussia	The ship capsized in the North Sea before 30 September. Her crew were rescued. She was on a voyage from Rügenwalde to King's Lynn, Norfolk, United Kent.
Argus	United Kingdom	The ship capsized and sank in the North Sea 10 nautical miles (19 km) north of Flamborough Head, Yorkshire with the loss of all hands. She was on a voyage from Hull, Yorkshire to Sunderland, County Durham.
Bull	Sweden	The ship was abandoned in the Atlantic Ocean. Her crew were rescued by Nathan Hale (United States). Bull was on a voyage from New York, United States to Gothenburg.
Collcastle	(United Kingdom of Great Britain and Ireland) New South Wales	The ship was wrecked in the Fiji Islands with the loss of three of her crew.
Eleanore	United Kingdom	The ship departed from Welle, Kingdom of Hanover for London. No further trace, presumed foundered with the loss of all hands.
Elvira	United Kingdom	The ship was abandoned in the Atlantic Ocean before 30 September. Her crew were rescued by Hebe (United Kingdom).
Febo	Kingdom of the Two Sicilies	The ship was wrecked at Naples between 11 and 14 September.
Golden Eagle	United Kingdom	The ship was driven ashore whilst on a voyage from Liverpool, Lancashire to Nassau, Bahamas. She was refloated and taken in to Key West, Florida, United States, where she arrived on 3 September.
Mahoning	United States	The 119-foot (36 m) brigantine went ashore in Lake Ontario at Oswego, New York. She was refloated and returned to service.
Mary Stewart	United Kingdom	The ship ran aground on the Nervo Reef, in the Gulf of Finland. She was on a voyage from Saint Petersburg, Russia to Londonderry. She was refloated and put in the Helsingør, Denmark, where she arrived on 22 September.
Matigheidsgenootschap	Netherlands	The ship departed from Newport, Rhode Island, United States for Amsterdam, North Holland after 20 September. No further trace, presumed foundered with the loss of all hands.
Mathilde	Prussia	The ship departed from Wolgast for London. No further trace, presumed foundered with the loss of all hands.
Oscar	Belgium	The ship was driven ashore at Camaret-sur-Mer, Finistère, France. Her crew were rescued. She was on a voyage from Bordeaux, Gironde, France to Ghent, East Flanders.
Pomona	United Kingdom	The ship was driven ashore near "Seetil Bahar", Ottoman Empire before 14 September. She was refloated.
Rapid	United Kingdom	The ship foundered in the North Sea off the coast of Yorkshire before 28 September.
Sovereign	United Kingdom	The schooner was abandoned in the North Sea off the coast of Northumberland before 28 September.
Superior	United Kingdom	The ship was driven ashore at Castrup, Denmark before 1 October. She was on a voyage from Saint Petersburg to and English port. She was refloated on 2 October and taken in to Copenhagen.
William Bright	United Kingdom	The ship was abandoned in the Atlantic Ocean before 1 October.
