= List of shipwrecks in February 1840 =

The list of shipwrecks in February 1840 includes ships sunk, foundered, wrecked, grounded, or otherwise lost during February 1840.

== 1 February ==
List of shipwrecks: 1 February 1840
Ship	State	Description
Aurora	Netherlands	The ship was wrecked on a reef off St. George's, Bermuda. All on board were rescued. She was on a voyage from Havana, Cuba to an Amsterdam, North Holland.
Caledonia	United Kingdom	The ship ran aground at Saint Peter Port, Guernsey, Channel Islands. She was on a voyage from Rio de Janeiro, Brazil to Saint Peter Port. She was subsequently run into by Beverley (United Kingdom).
Cygnet	United Kingdom	The ship was driven ashore west of Hœdic, Morbihan, France. Her crew were rescued. She was on a voyage from Paimbœuf, Loire-Inférieure, France to an English port.
Emma	United Kingdom	The ship was driven ashore 9 nautical miles (17 km) west of Sanlúcar de Barrameda, Spain. She was on a voyage from Seville, Spain to London. Emma was later refloated and put back to Seville, where she arrived on 24 April.
Gipsy	United Kingdom	The sloop ran aground on the Elbow End Bank off the mouth of the River Tay and was damaged. She was on a voyage from Leith, Lothian to Dundee, Forfarshire. Gipsy was refloated and taken into Dundee.
Good Intent	United Kingdom	The ship was run down and sunk in the River Tees by London (United Kingdom).
Julie	France	The ship was driven ashore near Vlissingen, Zeeland, Netherlands. She was on a voyage from Marseille, Bouches-du-Rhône to Dunkirk, Nord. Julie was refloated and taken into Vlissingen.
Lady of the Isles	United Kingdom	The ship was driven ashore at Tenby, Pembrokeshire. She was later refloated.
Nautilus	United Kingdom	The ship was driven ashore at Tenby.
Petit Glaneuse	United Kingdom	The ship was run down and sunk in the River Thames as Erith, Kent, United Kingdom. She was on a voyage from Barfleur, Manche to London.
Prince of Wales	United Kingdom	The ship ran aground at Hartlepool, County Durham and was wrecked. She was on a voyage from Hartlepool to Stockton-on-Tees.
Ruby	United Kingdom	The sloop ran aground on the Elbow End Bank. She floated off but consequently sank. Her crew were rescued.
Union	United Kingdom	The ship was driven ashore at "Craip Leith", Lothian. She was refloated and taken into Dunbar, Lothian for repairs.

== 2 February ==
List of shipwrecks: 2 February 1840
Ship	State	Description
Adeona	United Kingdom	The ship was driven ashore in Carnarvon Bay. Her crew were rescued. She was on a voyage from Newport, Monmouthshire to Liverpool, Lancashire.
Amelie	United Kingdom	The ship was wrecked at Gâvres, Morbihan. Her crew were rescued. She was on a voyage from Guadeloupe to Nantes, Loire-Inférieure.
Friede	Lübeck	The ship ran aground off Læsø, Denmark and was damaged. She was on a voyage from Liverpool to Lübeck.
Gowlands	United Kingdom	The ship ran aground on the Calshot Spit, in the Solent. She was on a voyage from Southampton to Lymington, Hampshire. Gowlands was refloated on 25 February and resumed her voyage.
Henrietta	United Kingdom	The ship was destroyed by fire at Bahía Blanca, Argentina.
Lady Louisa	United Kingdom	The ship was wrecked in Crow Sound, Isles of Scilly. Her crew were rescued. She was on a voyage from Rio de Janeiro, Brazil to Cowes, Isle of Wight.
Louise	France	The ship was wrecked at Barreiro, Portugal. Her crew were rescued. She was on a voyage from Saint Thomas's to Havre de Grâce, Seine-Inférieure.
Robert Jardyne	United Kingdom	The ship was driven onto the Annal Sandbank, off Montrose, Forfarshire. She was on a voyage from Inverness to Sunderland, County Durham.
Terre-Neuvier	France	The ship was driven ashore on the south east point of Heneaga. She was on a voyage from Aux Cayes, Haiti to Havre de Grâce, Seine-Inférieure.

== 3 February ==
List of shipwrecks: 3 February 1840
Ship	State	Description
Alfred	France	The ship ran aground at Havre de Grâce, Seine-Inférieure and was damaged. She put back to Havre de Grâce.
Charlotte	United Kingdom	The ship was driven ashore at Portsmouth, Hampshire. She was on a voyage from Terceira Island, Azores to Portsmouth. Charlotte was refloated.
Elada and Antoine	France	The ship ran aground at Havre de Grâce and was damaged. She put back to Havre de Grâce.
Margaret	United Kingdom	The ship was wrecked on Fernando de Noronha, Brazil. Her crew were rescued. She was on a voyage from Lima, Peru to Liverpool, Lancashire.
Jeune Elise	France	The ship was driven ashore at South Lancing, Sussex, United Kingdom. She was on a voyage from Honfleur, Calvados to Shoreham-by-Sea, Sussex. Jeune Elise was refloated on 6 February and taken into Shoreham-by-Sea.
Queen	United Kingdom	The ship was driven ashore crewless at Poole, Dorset. She was on a voyage from London to Falmouth, Cornwall.
Surprise	United Kingdom	The ship sank at Ilfracombe, Devon. Her crew were rescued.

== 4 February ==
List of shipwrecks: 4 February 1840
Ship	State	Description
Auguste	France	The ship was driven ashore at Camaret-sur-Mer, Finistère. Her crew were rescued.
Bolett	Norway	The ship was driven ashore and wrecked near Douarnenez, Finistère with the loss of her captain. She was on a voyage from Bergen to Le Croisic, Loire-Inférieure, France.
Ceurrieur	France	The ship was driven ashore at Camaret-sur-Mer. Her crew were rescued.
Cinq Frères	France	The ship was driven ashore at Camaret-sur-Mer. Her crew were rescued.
Cordelia	United Kingdom	The schooner was wrecked on the Goodwin Sands, Kent. Her crew were rescued. She was on a voyage from Youghal, County Cork to London.
Edouard	France	The ship was driven ashore at Camaret-sur-Mer. Her crew were rescued.
Elizabeth and Mary	United Kingdom	The ship was driven ashore at Penzance, Cornwall.
Emma	United Kingdom	The ship was driven ashore near Santa Lucía de Tirajana, Canary Islands. She was on a voyage from Seville, Spain to London.
Falcon	United Kingdom	The ship was driven ashore on Texel, North Holland, Netherlands. Her crew were rescued. She was on a voyage from Sunderland, County Durham to Schiedam, South Holland.
Familien	France	The ship was driven ashore and wrecked at Douarnenez.
Fils Unique	France	The ship was driven ashore at Camaret-sur-Mer. Her crew were rescued.
Jeune Adolphe	France	The ship was driven ashore at Camaret-sur-Mer. Her crew were rescued.
Jeune Victor	France	The sloop was driven ashore and wrecked at Rye, Sussex, United Kingdom. Her crew were rescued. She was on a voyage from Granville, Manche to Saint-Malo, Ille-et-Vilaine.
Liffey	United Kingdom	The ship was wrecked near Porsalle, Finistère, France with the loss of three of her crew.
Louise Gabrielle	France	The ship was destroyed by fire at New Grimsby, Isles of Scilly, United Kingdom. She was on a voyage from St. Ubes, Portugal to Boulogne, Pas-de-Calais.
Pierre Marie	France	The ship was driven ashore at Camaret-sur-Mer. Her crew were rescued.
Shannon	United Kingdom	The ship foundered off the coast of Finistère.
Siren	(United Kingdom of Great Britain and Ireland) New South Wales	The brig struck the Tory Shoal, in Kaipara Harbour, New Zealand and wad damaged. She was consequently condemned.
St. Lawrence	(United Kingdom of Great Britain and Ireland) British North America	The ship was driven ashore and wrecked 6 nautical miles (11 km) from Tralee, County Kerry. Her crew were rescued. She was on a voyage from Dalhousie, New Brunswick to Caernarfon.
Symmetry	United Kingdom	The ship was driven ashore and wrecked in the Isles of Scilly. Her crew were rescued.
William Randfield	United Kingdom	The full-rigged ship was driven ashore and wrecked at Portreath, Cornwall with the loss of five of her eight crew.

== 5 February ==
List of shipwrecks: 5 February 1840
Ship	State	Description
Bolivar	Spain	The ship was wrecked in the Caicos Islands. Her crew were rescued. She was on a voyage from Santa Marta, Republic of New Granada to Cádiz.
Catherine	United Kingdom	The schooner was driven ashore on Priestholm, Anglesey, at the entrance to the Menai Strait. Her crew were rescued. She was on a voyage from Liverpool, Lancashire to County Clare. She was refloated on 3 March and taken into Beaumaris, Anglesey.
Elizabeth	United Kingdom	The ship was driven ashore at Cardigan. She was on a voyage from Liverpool to Waterford. Elizabeth was refloated the next day.
Hero	United Kingdom	The barque was driven ashore and wrecked at Bude, Cornwall with the loss of all eleven crew. She was on her maiden voyage, from Liverpool to London.
Kitty	United Kingdom	The ship was wrecked in Ramsey Sound. Her crew were rescued. She was on a voyage from Clonakilty, County Cork to Bristol, Gloucestershire.
Lamia	United Kingdom	The ship was driven ashore at The Mumbles, Glamorgan. She was on a voyage from Swansea, Glamorgan to Falmouth, Cornwall. She was later refloated.
Lion	United Kingdom	The ship foundered off the north coast of Cornwall with the loss of all hands.
Liverpool	United Kingdom	The sloop was wrecked near Padstow, Cornwall with the loss of all hands. She was on a voyage from Liverpool to London.
Margaret	United Kingdom	The ship was driven ashore at The Mumbles. She was on a voyage from Newport, Monmouthshire to Youghal, County Cork. She was later refloated.
Mary Ann	United Kingdom	The ship was driven ashore at The Mumbles. She was on a voyage from Bridgwater, Somerset to Aberavon, Glamorgan. She was later refloated.
Mary Ann	United Kingdom	The ship was driven ashore at The Mumbles. She was on a voyage from Bristol, Gloucestershire to Swansea. She was later refloated.
Mercury	United Kingdom	The ship was driven ashore and wrecked at Morriscastle, County Wexford. Her crew were rescued.
Perseverance	United Kingdom	The ship was wrecked at Cardigan. Her crew were rescued. She was on a voyage from Liverpool to Southampton, Hampshire.
Perth	United Kingdom	The ship was driven ashore at The Mumbles. She was on a voyage from Neath, Glamorgan to Padstow, Cornwall. She was later refloated.
Robinson	United Kingdom	The ship struck the Bishop Rock, Isles of Scilly and was damaged. She was on a voyage from Greenock, Renfrewshire to Messina, Sicily. She put into Milford Haven, Pembrokeshire in a sinking condition.
San José	Spain	The felucca was abandoned. All nine people on board were rescued by Vittorioso (Malta) before she foundered.
Sarah Nicholson	United Kingdom	The ship ran aground at Barbas Point, Ottoman Empire. She was on a voyage from Newcastle upon Tyne, Northumberland to Constantinople, Ottoman Empire. Sarah Nicholson was later refloated and resumed her voyage.
Tar	United Kingdom	The schooner capsized in the English Channel 8 nautical miles (15 km) south west of The Needles, Isle of Wight. with the loss of all hands. She was on a voyage from Great Yarmouth, Norfolk to Bristol, Gloucestershire.
Tiber	United Kingdom	The ship was driven ashore on Priestholm. Her crew were rescued. She was on a voyage from Liverpool to Falmouth.

== 6 February ==
List of shipwrecks: 6 February 1840
Ship	State	Description
Agnes	United Kingdom	The ship ran aground at Port Patrick, Wigtownshire.
Charlotte	Flag unknown	The ship ran aground on the Wresen Sandbank. She was on a voyage from Riga, Russia to Schiedam, South Holland, Netherlands. Charlotte was refloated and taken into Nyborg, Denmark.
Friends	United Kingdom	The ship was wrecked on the Paternoster Rock. Her crew were rescued. She was on a voyage from Table Bay to St Helena Bay.
Thames	United Kingdom	The ship was dismasted and abandoned off St. Ives, Cornwall. She was on a voyage from Liverpool, Lancashire to Newcastle upon Tyne, Northumberland. Thames was taken into St. Ives.
Vigilant	United Kingdom	The two-masted ship was driven ashore and wrecked at Sybel Head, County Kerry.
William and Maria	United Kingdom	The ship was driven ashore at Newtownness, Pembrokeshire.

== 7 February ==
List of shipwrecks: 7 February 1840
Ship	State	Description
Atlas	Denmark	The ship was driven ashore at the Three Crowns Battery, Copenhagen. She was on a voyage from Copenhagen to St. Ubes, Portugal. Atlas was refloated and put back to Copenhagen.
Aurelia	United Kingdom	The ship struck the pier and sank at Ramsgate, Kent. She was on a voyage from Newcastle upon Tyne, Northumberland to Bermuda.
Babette	United Kingdom	The ship was driven ashore and wrecked near Ystad, Sweden. She was on a voyage from Liebau, Prussia to Dundee, Forfarshire.
Brothers and Sisters	United Kingdom	The ship was wrecked on the Long Sand, in the North Sea off the coast of Essex. Her crew were rescued. She was on a voyage from Newcastle upon Tyne to Rouen, Seine-Inférieure, France.
Duke of Buccleugh	United Kingdom	The ship was wrecked on the Palmiras Reef with the loss of a passenger. Survivors were rescued by Miranda (United Kingdom). Duke of Buccleuch was on a voyage from London to Calcutta, India.
Elizabeth	United Kingdom	The ship was driven ashore at Bowmore, Islay and was scuttled. She was refloated on 19 February and taken into Bowmore.
Fanny	United Kingdom	The ship was wrecked at Vila Nova, Terceira Island, Azores with the loss of two of her crew.
Fergus	United Kingdom	The ship was driven ashore at Galway.
Haytons	United Kingdom	The schooner was driven ashore and wrecked on the Cairnbulg-riggs, Aberdeenshire. Her crew were rescued. She was on a voyage from Dingwall, Ross-shire to Sunderland, County Durham.
Jessy	United Kingdom	The ship struck Whitby Rock and was severely damaged.
Little Sam	United Kingdom	The ship was run into by Albion (United Kingdom) and sank in Filey Bay with the loss of a passenger. Her crew were rescued by Albion. Little Sam was on a voyage from Newcastle upon Tyneto Great Yarmouth, Norfolk.
Mabon	United Kingdom	The ship ran aground and sank off Eyemouth, Berwickshire. Her crew were rescued. She was on a voyage from Hull, Yorkshire to Leith, Lothian.
Nelson	United Kingdom	The ship was in collision with Hope (United Kingdom) and foundered in the North Sea 6 nautical miles (11 km) south of Scarborough, Yorkshire. Her crew were rescued by Hope.
Nepean	United Kingdom	The schooner was wrecked at Portland Bill, Dorset. Her crew were rescued. She was on a voyage from South Shields, County Durham to Bridport, Dorset.
Ochiltree	United Kingdom	The ship was driven ashore in Lough Swilly. She was on a voyage from Glasgow, Renfrewshire to Lough Swilly.
Port Packet	United Kingdom	The ship was driven ashore on the coast of Northumberland. She was on a voyage from King's Lynn, Norfolk to Leith. Port Packet was later refloated and taken into Blyth, Northumberland.
Shark	United Kingdom	The brig was driven ashore at "Bunoran", County Galway. Her crew survived. She was on a voyage from Newfoundland, British North America to Liverpool, Lancashire.
Theodore	United States	The ship was lost off Cape Raynett, Haiti. Her crew were rescued. She was on a voyage from New York to Aux Cayes, Haiti.

== 8 February ==
List of shipwrecks: 8 February 1840
Ship	State	Description
Alfred	United Kingdom	The ship ran aground in the River Blackwater. She was on a voyage from Youghal, County Cork to London. Alfred was refloated the next day.
Antelope	United Kingdom	The ship collided with John Clifton (United Kingdom and foundered in the North Sea off Flamborough Head, Yorkshire. Her crew were rescued. She was on a voyage from South Shields, County Durham to Bordeaux, Gironde, France.
Industry	United Kingdom	The ship was abandoned in the Atlantic Ocean. Her crew were rescued by Emma (United Kingdom). Industry was on a voyage from Newfoundland, British North America to London.
Mermaid	United Kingdom	The cutter was driven ashore and wrecked at Port Maria, Jamaica. Her crew were rescued.
Powhattan	United States	The ship was driven ashore at Lytham St Annes, Lancashire, United Kingdom. She was on a voyage from New Orleans, Louisiana to Liverpool, Lancashire. Powhattan was refloated on 17 February and taken into Liverpool.
Sarah	(United Kingdom of Great Britain and Ireland) Jamaica	The sloop was wrecked on Galina Point. Her crew were rescued. She was on a voyage from Kingston to Dry Harbour.
Sybil	United Kingdom	The ship was driven ashore in Loch Ryan. She was on a voyage from Wexford to Glasgow, Renfrewshire.
Topaz	United Kingdom	The ship was in collision with Eliza (United Kingdom) off Flamborough Head and foundered. Her crew were rescued. She was on a voyage from Stockton-on-Tees, County Durham to London.

== 9 February ==
List of shipwrecks: 9 February 1840
Ship	State	Description
Anna Agatha	United Kingdom	The ship sprang a leak and was beached at Angle, Pembrokeshire. She was on a voyage from Liverpool, Lancashire to Rotterdam, South Holland, Netherlands.
Demuth	Duchy of Holstein	The ship was driven ashore by ice at Tønning. She was on a voyage from Tønning to Hull, Yorkshire, United Kingdom.
Gipsy	United Kingdom	The ship was driven ashore at Blyth, Northumberland. She was later refloated and resumed her voyage.
Havre	United States	The ship was destroyed by fire 7 nautical miles (13 km) off Cobh, County Cork, United Kingdom. All twenty people on board were rescued by a pilot boat. She was on a voyage from New Orleans, Louisiana to Liverpool.

== 10 February ==
List of shipwrecks: 10 February 1840
Ship	State	Description
Dart	United Kingdom	The ship was wrecked near Campbeltown, Argyllshire. Her crew were rescued. She was on a voyage from Wexford to Glasgow, Renfrewshire.
Economy	United Kingdom	The ship ran aground on the Barber Sand, in the North Sea off the coast of Norfolk. She was later refloated.
Espeleta	France	The ship was driven ashore at Boulogne, Pas-de-Calais. She was on a voyage from Charleston, South Carolina to Dunkirk, Nord. Espeleta was refloated on 17 February and towed into Boulogne.
Jean Bart	France	The ship struck the pier and sank at Great Yarmouth, Norfolk. She was on a voyage from Sunderland, County Durham, United Kingdom to Bordeaux, Gironde.
Kezia	United Kingdom	The schooner ran aground on the Maplin Sand, in the North Sea off the coast of Essex. She was on a voyage from Goole, Yorkshire to London.
Majestic	United Kingdom	The ship was driven ashore in the Sound of Mull. She was refloated on 16 February.
Martha Harrison	United Kingdom	The ship was driven ashore in Bunowen Bay. Her crew were rescued. She was on a voyage from Newfoundland, British North America to Liverpool, Lancashire.
Sara	United Kingdom	The ship was driven ashore and wrecked between the mouth to the Knasborg Stream and "Napliert", Denmark. Her crew were rescued. She was on a voyage from Belfast, County Down to Aarhus, Denmark.

== 11 February ==
List of shipwrecks: 11 February 1840
Ship	State	Description
Britannia	United Kingdom	The ship struck the North Carr Rock, in the North Sea off the coast of Forfarshire, and foundered. Her crew were rescued, She was on a voyage from Montrose, Forfarshire to Newcastle upon Tyne, Northumberland.
British Heroine	United Kingdom	The ship was driven ashore and wrecked at Derbyhaven, Isle of ManShe was on a voyage from Greenock, Renfrewshire to New Orleans, Lincolnshire.
Cato	United Kingdom	The ship ran aground at Stromness, Orkney Islands. She was on a voyage from Newcastle upon Tyne to Galway. Cato was refloated on 26 February and resumed her voyage.
Orders	United Kingdom	The ship was driven ashore and damaged at Redcar, Yorkshire. She was on a voyage from Selby, East Riding of Yorkshire to Stockton-on-Tees, County Durham. Orders was later refloated.
Wilhelmine	Stettin	The ship was driven ashore at Barhöft, Prussia. She was on a voyage from Bo'ness, Lothian, United Kingdom to Stettin. Wilhelmine was refloated and taken into Stralsund.

== 12 February ==
List of shipwrecks: 12 February 1840
Ship	State	Description
Dart	United Kingdom	The sloop was driven ashore near Skipness, Ayrshire. Her crew were rescued.
Evenwood	United Kingdom	The ship ran aground on the Gunfleet Sand, in the North Sea off the coast of Essex. She was on a voyage from Hartlepool, County Durham to London. Evenwood was refloated on 16 February and resumed her voyage.
Kennesley	United Kingdom	The ship ran aground on the Maplin Sand, in the North Sea off the coast of Essex. She was on a voyage from Goole, Yorkshire to London.
Liberty	United Kingdom	The ship was driven ashore at Whitehaven, Cumberland.
Mary	United Kingdom	The ship capsized off Great Orme Head, Caernarfonshire. Her crew were rescued.
Roman	United Kingdom	The ship collided with Richard Anderson (United Kingdom) and foundered in the Irish Sea off Holyhead, Anglesey with the loss of her captain. Survivors were rescued by Richard Anderson. Roman was on a voyage from Savannah, Georgia, United States to Liverpool, Lancashire.
Rover	United Kingdom	The schooner ran aground at Lindisfarne, Northumberland.

== 13 February ==
List of shipwrecks: 13 February 1840
Ship	State	Description
Avalon	United Kingdom	The brig was driven ashore and wrecked near Porto, Portugal. She was on a voyage from Newfoundland, British North America to Porto.
Tyrian	United Kingdom	The barque was in collision with Manchester (United Kingdom) and sank in the River Thames at Tilbury, Essex with the loss of five lives. Tyrian was on a voyage from London to Valparaíso, Chile and Lima, Peru. She was refloated on 6 March and anchored at Northfleet, Kent. She was refloated on 13 March and beached at Grays Thurrock, Essex.

== 14 February ==
List of shipwrecks: 14 February 1840
Ship	State	Description
John Woodall	United Kingdom	The ship was driven ashore at Mockbeggar, Cheshire. She was on a voyage from Liverpool, Lancashire to Rio de Janeiro, Brazil. John Woodall was refloated the next day and put back to Liverpool.
Mary Queen of Scots	United Kingdom	The ship capsized at Plymouth, Devon.

== 15 February ==
List of shipwrecks: 15 February 1840
Ship	State	Description
Hebe	United Kingdom	The ship was driven ashore and wrecked at Forked Harbour, Cape Breton Island, Nova Scotia, British North America. Her crew were rescued. She was on a voyage from Trinidad to Saint Andrews, New Brunswick, British North America.
John Porter	United Kingdom	The ship was driven ashore and wrecked at St. Mary's, Newfoundland, British North America.
Mary Hartley	United Kingdom	The ship foundered in Carnarvon Bay.
Sarah Maria	United Kingdom	The ship was driven ashore north of Tillen Head, County Donegal and was wrecked. She was on a voyage from the Clyde to Barbados.
Slaney	United Kingdom	The brig ran aground on the Rush Bank. She was later refloated and taken into Wexford.
Venus	United Kingdom	The ship capsized and sank at Kilrush, County Cork. sHe was on a voyage from Saint John, New Brunswick, British North America to Cork.

== 16 February ==
List of shipwrecks: 16 February 1840
Ship	State	Description
Whitehaven	United Kingdom	The ship was driven ashore at Longhope, Orkney Islands. She was on a voyage from the Orkney Islands to Saint Domingo. Whitehaven was refloated and resumed her voyage.

== 17 February ==
List of shipwrecks: 17 February 1840
Ship	State	Description
Coquette	United Kingdom	The ship was driven ashore near Camden Fort, County Cork. She was on a voyage from Cork to Limerick. Coquette was refloated but subsequently ran aground.
Dove	United Kingdom	The ship was driven ashore and damaged at Port Talbot, Glamorgan. She was refloated on 4 March and taken into Port Talbot.
Gaillardon	United Kingdom	The barque was wrecked on the northern side of False Point at the mouth of the Hooghly River. Her crew were rescued. The mate pilot was drowned trying to the save wreck.
Henrietta	United Kingdom	The ship was driven ashore at Aberavon, Glamorgan. She was refloated on 2 April and taken into Port Talbot, Glamorgan.
Maquasha	United Kingdom	The ship ran aground at Ramsgate, Kent. She was on a voyage from Ramsgate to the Cape of Good Hope.
Princess Charlotte	United Kingdom	The ship ran aground off Newtown, Isle of Wight. She was on a voyage from Portsmouth, Hampshire to Trinidad. Princess Charlotte was refloated on 19 February.
Quicksilver	United Kingdom	The ship was driven ashore and damaged at Port Talbot. She was later refloated.
Swan	United Kingdom	The ship was driven ashore and damaged at Port Talbot. She was later refloated.

== 18 February ==
List of shipwrecks: 18 February 1840
Ship	State	Description
Abercrombie	United Kingdom	The ship ran aground off Copper Point, County Cork. She was on a voyage from Cork to Mobile, Alabama, United States. Abercrombie was refloated on 19 February.
Isis	United Kingdom	The ship was holed by her anchor or a pile and sank at Shoreham-by-Sea, Sussex. She was on a voyage from Blakeney, Norfolk to Shoreham-by-Sea. Isis was later refloated.
Maguasha	United Kingdom	The ship ran aground at Ramsgate, Kent. She was on a voyage from Ramsgate to the Cape of Good Hope.
Margaretta	United Kingdom	The ship sank in the Saltee Islands, County Wexford. Her crew were rescued. She was on a voyage from Bangor to New Ross, County Wexford.
Thomas and Mary	United Kingdom	The schooner foundered in the Irish Sea. Her crew took to the boat and were rescued the next day by Elizabeth and Jane (United Kingdom). Thomas and Mary was on a voyage from Liverpool, Lancashire to London.

== 19 February ==
List of shipwrecks: 19 February 1840
Ship	State	Description
Adelaide	(United Kingdom of Great Britain and Ireland) British North America	The ship was driven ashore 3 nautical miles (5.6 km) south of Long Branch, New Jersey, United States. She was on a voyage from Dominica to Nova Scotia.
Palestine	United Kingdom	The ship struck the Middle Bank, in the English Channel off the coast of Sussex and sank. She was on a voyage from Livorno, Grand Duchy of Tuscany to Portsmouth, Hampshire. Palestine was refloated on 15 July and beached at Selsey, Sussex.

== 20 February ==
List of shipwrecks: 20 February 1840
Ship	State	Description
Eagle	United Kingdom	The ship ran aground and sank at Wexford. Her crew were rescued. She was on a voyage from Great Yarmouth, Norfolk to Wexford.
Sylph	United Kingdom	The ship was destroyed by fire in the Atlantic Ocean. She was on a voyage from Halifax, Nova Scotia, British North America to Liverpool, Lancashire.

== 21 February ==
List of shipwrecks: 21 February 1840
Ship	State	Description
Commodore	United Kingdom	The ship ran aground at Cork. She was on a voyage from Cork to Trinidad.
Despatch	United Kingdom	The ship ran aground on the Cant Sand, in the Thames Estuary and sank. She was on a voyage from London to the Isle of Wight.
Gowland	United Kingdom	The ship ran aground on the Calship Spit, in the Solent. She was on a voyage from Southampton to Lymington, Hampshire. Gowland was refloated on 25 February and resumed her voyage.
Lisette Caroline	Netherlands	The ship was driven ashore west of Shoreham-by-Sea, Sussex, United Kingdom and capsized. She was subsequently beached and righted. Lisette Caroline was on a voyage from Bordeaux, Gironde, France to Amsterdam, North Holland.
Maria Ann	United Kingdom	The ship departed from Gloucester for Portsmouth, Hampshire. No further trace, presumed foundered with the loss of all hands.
Veronica	Hamburg	The ship foundered in the English Channel off The Needles, Isle of Wight. Her crew were rescued. She was on a voyage from Hamburg to Nantes, Loire Atlantique, France.

== 22 February ==
List of shipwrecks: 22 February 1840
Ship	State	Description
Anna Ellena	Netherlands	The ship ran aground and sank in the Friesland Channel. Her crew were rescued. She was on a voyage from Groningen to London, United Kingdom.
Flora	United Kingdom	The ship ran aground on the Freezing Pan Shoals. She was on a voyage from Liverpool, Lancashire to Saint John, New Brunswick, British North America and Savannah, Georgia, United States.
Johanna Catherina	Grand Duchy of Oldenburg	The ship ran aground in the Weser. She was on a voyage from Brake to London. She was refloated and put back to Brake for repairs.
Louis	Belgium	The ship departed from Havana, Cuba for Antwerp. No further trace, presumed foundered in the Atlantic Ocean with the loss of all hands.
Venerable	United Kingdom	The ship was wrecked at Cape Agulhas, Cape Colony. Her crew were rescued. She was on a voyage from Mauritius to Cork.

== 23 February ==
List of shipwrecks: 23 February 1840
Ship	State	Description
Diana	United Kingdom	The ship was driven ashore in Cemlyn Bay. She was on a voyage from Mostyn, Flintshire to Waterford.
June and Ellen	United Kingdom	The ship struck a rock in St. Helen's Gap, lost her rudder and was driven ashore and wrecked on St Helen's, Isles of Scilly. She was on a voyage from Bangor to London.
Medora	United Kingdom	The ship was driven ashore in Ardmore Bay, where she became a wreck on 23 February. She was on a voyage from Great Yarmouth, Norfolk to Swansea, Glamorgan. The Master and three crew were rescued by the Youghal lifeboat, with the RNIPLS Gold Medal awarded to Lt. Richard James Morrison, RN, H.M. Coastguard.
True Briton	United Kingdom	The ship was beached at Twielenfleth. She was on a voyage from Sunderland, County Durham to Hamburg.

== 24 February ==
List of shipwrecks: 24 February 1840
Ship	State	Description
Falcon	United Kingdom	The ship ran aground on the Scheelbank, in the North Sea off the Dutch coast. She was later refloated and resumed her voyage.
Thomas Parsons	United Kingdom	The ship was destroyed by an explosion at Old Calabar with the loss of all but four of her crew.

== 25 February ==
List of shipwrecks: 25 February 1840
Ship	State	Description
Henry	United Kingdom	The ship was driven ashore at Margate, Kent. She was on a voyage from London to the Cape of Good Hope. Henry was refloated but consequently beached at Whitstable, Kent. She was refloated on 3 March and taken into Whitstable.

== 26 February ==
List of shipwrecks: 26 February 1840
Ship	State	Description
Suffolk	United Kingdom	The ship departed from Matanzas, Cuba for Hamburg. No further trace, presumed foundered with the loss of all hands.

== 27 February ==
List of shipwrecks: 27 February 1840
Ship	State	Description
Magdalene	Hamburg	The schooner was driven ashore at "Sunnesand". She was on a voyage from Nienstedten to Leith, Lothian, United Kingdom. Magdalene was refloated on 2 March and taken into "Ellyshaven".
Robert	United Kingdom	The ship struck rocks off Godrevy, Cornwall and sank. Her crew were rescued. She was on a voyage from Bangor to London.

== 28 February ==
List of shipwrecks: 28 February 1840
Ship	State	Description
Amelie	France	The ship was driven ashore near Dénia, Spain. Her crew were rescued. She was on a voyage from Marseille, Bouches-du-Rhône to Havre de Grâce, Seine-Inférieure.
Weltevreden	Netherlands	The ship was driven ashore on Goeree, Zeeland. She was on a voyage from Batavia, Netherlands East Indies to Rotterdam, South Holland.

== 29 February ==
List of shipwrecks: 29 February 1840
Ship	State	Description
Alfred	United Kingdom	The ship ran aground at Youghal, County Cork and was damaged. She was on a voyage from Youghal to London. Alfred was refloated and put back to Youghal.
Columbine	(United Kingdom of Great Britain and Ireland) New South Wales	The schooner foundered in the Bay of Plenty.
Diana	(United Kingdom of Great Britain and Ireland) New South Wales	The ship was driven ashore in the Bay of Plenty.
Felix	(United Kingdom of Great Britain and Ireland) New South Wales	The schooner foundered off the east coast of North Island, New Zealand with the loss of all on board. She was on a voyage from Coromandel, New Zealand to the Bay of Islands.
Harriet	(United Kingdom of Great Britain and Ireland) New South Wales	The whaler was wrecked off the Karikari Peninsula, New Zealand.
Navarino	(United Kingdom of Great Britain and Ireland) New South Wales	The ship was wrecked in the Bay of Plenty.
Trent	(United Kingdom of Great Britain and Ireland) New South Wales	The schooner was wrecked at Tegadoo Bay, New Zealand.
Ulitea	(United Kingdom of Great Britain and Ireland) New South Wales	By some accounts, the schooner was lost off New Zealand's East Cape with the loss of all hands. By another account, the schooner was wrecked east of Sulphur Point in Tauranga Harbour; master and crew saved.
Vittoria	(United Kingdom of Great Britain and Ireland) New South Wales	The barque was wrecked on New Zealand's Farewell Spit. All on board were rescued.

== Unknown date ==
List of shipwrecks: Unknown date in February 1840
Ship	State	Description
Aberfoil	United Kingdom	The ship was driven ashore near "Carabournon", on the coast of the Black Sea, where she had become a wreck by 18 February. She was on a voyage from Odesa to London.
Aimable Celeste	France	The ship was abandoned in the Atlantic Ocean. Her crew were rescued by Antonia (United Kingdom). Aimable Celeste was on a voyage from Laguna to Dunkirk, Nord, France.
Aimable Marie	France	The ship was beached near Havre de Grâce, Seine-Inférieure with the loss of all hands on or before 9 February. She was on a voyage from Saint Domingo to Havre de Grâce.
Alexander	United States	The ship was wrecked off Saint Domingo. Her crew were rescued. She was on a voyage from New York to Aux Cayes, Haiti.
Ann	United Kingdom	The ship departed from Constantinople, Ottoman Empire for Genoa, Kingdom of Sardinia. No further trace, presumed foundered with the loss of all hands.
Belle of Missouri	United States	The steamship was caught fire and exploded in the Missouri River 80 nautical miles (150 km) downstream of St. Louis, Missouri with the loss of one life.
Carol	(United Kingdom of Great Britain and Ireland) New South Wales	The cutter was driven ashore and wrecked in the Bay of Plenty.
Dageraad	Netherlands	The ship foundered off the Île-de-Sein, Finistère, France before 24 February with the loss of all hands. She was on a voyage from Alicante, Spain to Gibraltar and Amsterdam, North Holland.
Dispatch	United Kingdom	The ship was driven ashore in Bigbury Bay before 5 February. She subsequently broke up.
Dorothy	United Kingdom	The ship was abandoned in the Atlantic Ocean. Her crew were rescued by Cartaretta (United Kingdom). Dorothy was on a voyage from Saint John, New Brunswick, British North America to Hull, Yorkshire.
Espeleta	France	The ship was driven ashore near Boulogne, Pas-de-Calais, France. She was on a voyage from Charleston, South Carolina, United States to Dunkirk, Nord. Espeleta was refloated on 17 February and taken into Boulogne.
Grace	United Kingdom	The ship was abandoned in the North Sea before 5 February. Her crew were rescued by Unity (United Kingdom). Grace subsequently foundered.
Guineaman	United Kingdom	The ship was driven ashore at Margate, Kent. She was on a voyage from Africa to London. Guineaman was refloated on 5 February.
Henry Volant	United Kingdom	The ship was driven ashore at Ballyshannon, County Donegal. She was refloated on 6 February.
James Stevens	United Kingdom	The ship foundered off the north coast of Cornwall before 6 February.
Kate and Jane	United Kingdom	The ship was driven ashore at Landguard Fort, Harwich, Essex. She was on a voyage from Liverpool, Lancashire to Harwich. Kate and Jane was refloated on 4 February and taken into Harwich.
Lisle	France	The ship was wrecked on the Needles Rocks, off the Cape of Good Hope with some loss of life. She was on a voyage from Mauritius to Bordeaux, Gironde.
Mercury	United Kingdom	The ship was abandoned in the North Sea. She was subsequently taken into Eyemouth, Berwickshire, where she arrived on 19 February.
Ontario	(United Kingdom of Great Britain and Ireland) British North America	The ship foundered in the Bristol Channel off the coast of Glamorgan on or before 10 February.
Plata	United Kingdom	The ship foundered in the Atlantic Ocean before 27 February. Her crew were rescued by Cora (United Kingdom). Plata was on a voyage from Liverpool to Trinidad.
Pratt	United Kingdom	The ship was driven ashore on the coast of Essex. She was on a voyage from Chatham, Kent to London.
Puddy Puddy	(United Kingdom of Great Britain and Ireland) New South Wales	The schooner was wrecked near the Bay of Islands.
Resolution	United Kingdom	The barque foundered 100 nautical miles (190 km) west of Gibraltar with the loss of at least three lives.
St. Lawrence	(United Kingdom of Great Britain and Ireland) British North America	The ship was driven ashore near Tralee, County Cork on or before 11 February. She was on a voyage from Dalhousie, New Brunswick to Caernarfon. St. Lawrence later broke up.
William	United Kingdom	The ship was driven ashore at Limerick. She was on a voyage from British Honduras to Cork. William was refloated on 6 February.
