= Lúcio Bala =

Lúcio Bala may refer to:

- Lúcio Bala (footballer, born 1955), Lúcio Alves Pompeu de Campos, Brazilian football right winger
- Lúcio Bala (footballer, born 1975), Lucenilde Pereira da Silva, Brazilian football defensive midfielder

== See also ==
- Lucio
