= Miranda Green =

Miranda Green may refer to:

- Miranda Green (British journalist), British journalist and former Press Secretary
- Miranda Green (American journalist), American journalist
- Miranda Green (academic) (born 1947), British archaeologist and academic
