= Miranda (ship) =

Several vessels have been named Miranda:

- Miranda (1828 ship) was launched in Bristol in 1828. In 1829–1830 she made one voyage to Bengal, sailing under a licence from the British East India Company (EIC). On her return she became a West Indiaman, sailing to Jamaica and Antigua. She was broken up around 1851.
- Miranda (1829 ship) was launched in Liverpool in 1829 as a West Indiaman. She was condemned at Calcutta in 1840.

== See also ==
- HMS Miranda – any one of three vessels of the Royal Navy
