= 1981 Campeonato Brasileiro Série B =

Campeonato Brasileiro Série B
- Season: 1981
- Champions: Guarani (1st title)
- Promoted: Guarani; Anapolina
- Matches: 197
- Goals: 489 (2.48 per match)
- Top goalscorer: Jorge Mendonça (Guarani) - 11 goals
- Biggest home win: Guarani 6-0 Serrano-RJ (January 21, 1981)
- Biggest away win: Anápolis 0-5 Bahia (January 31, 1981)
- Highest scoring: Vitória-ES 2-6 Americano (January 14, 1981)

The 1981 Campeonato Brasileiro Série B, officially, the Taça de Prata 1981, was the 4th edition of the Campeonato Brasileiro Série B. The championship was performed by 48 clubs, divided into 6 groups of 8 teams each, in which the two best teams of each group proceeded to the second phase, in which the twelve teams were divided into four groups of three teams.the first placed team of each group were promoted to the Second phase of the Taça de Ouro of the same year. the second placed teams of each group would proceed to the semifinals, disputed in a knockout tournament format, in which the winners were promoted to the Taça de Ouro of the following year.

== First phase ==
=== Group A ===
Pos	Team	Pld	W	D	L	GF	GA	GD	Pts
1	(Pará) Remo	6	4	2	0	12	4	+8	10 (Note: The match between Flamengo-PI and Remo wasn't played.)
2	(Pará) Tuna Luso	7	4	1	2	8	6	+2	9
3	Ceará	7	3	3	1	12	8	+4	9
4	(Ceará) Guarany de Sobral	7	2	2	3	6	9	−3	6
5	(Piauí) Flamengo-PI	6	2	1	3	5	6	−1	5
6	(Piauí) Tiradentes-PI	7	2	1	4	9	11	−2	5
7	Maranhão	7	2	1	4	9	13	−4	5
8	(Amazonas (Brazilian state)) Rio Negro	7	2	1	4	5	9	−4	5

=== Group B ===
Pos	Team	Pld	W	D	L	GF	GA	GD	Pts
1	(Pernambuco) Náutico	7	3	4	0	12	6	+6	10
2	(Paraíba) Botafogo-PB	7	3	3	1	10	7	+3	9
3	(Pernambuco) América-PE	7	3	3	1	6	5	+1	9
4	(Rio Grande do Norte) ABC	7	2	3	2	10	11	−1	7
5	(Pernambuco) Central	7	2	2	3	7	8	−1	6
6	(Sergipe) Confiança	7	2	1	4	7	10	−3	5
7	(Paraíba) Treze	7	2	1	4	8	11	−3	5
8	(Alagoas) ASA	7	1	3	3	5	7	−2	5

=== Group C ===
Pos	Team	Pld	W	D	L	GF	GA	GD	Pts
1	Bahia	7	5	0	2	13	7	+6	10
2	(Goiás) Anapolina	7	3	3	1	13	8	+5	9
3	(Mato Grosso) União Rondonópolis	7	3	2	2	7	7	0	8
4	(Bahia) Leônico	7	3	2	2	7	6	+1	8
5	(Goiás) Anápolis	7	2	4	1	6	9	−3	8
6	(Federal District (Brazil)) Gama	7	1	5	1	7	6	+1	7
7	(Bahia) Itabuna	7	1	2	4	5	10	−5	4
8	(Goiás) Atlético-GO	7	0	2	5	6	11	−5	2

=== Group D ===
Pos	Team	Pld	W	D	L	GF	GA	GD	Pts
1	(São Paulo (state)) Guarani	7	5	1	1	16	6	+10	11
2	(Paraná (state)) Coritiba	7	4	1	2	9	5	+4	9
3	(São Paulo (state)) Juventus	7	3	2	2	11	9	+2	8
4	(Rio de Janeiro (state)) Campo Grande	7	3	2	2	4	3	+1	8
5	(São Paulo (state)) Botafogo-SP	7	3	1	3	5	8	−3	7
6	(Paraná (state)) Grêmio Maringá	7	1	4	2	6	7	−1	6
7	(Paraná (state)) Cascavel	7	1	2	4	7	10	−3	4
8	(Rio de Janeiro (state)) Serrano-RJ	7	0	3	4	3	14	−11	3

=== Group E ===
Pos	Team	Pld	W	D	L	GF	GA	GD	Pts
1	(Minas Gerais) Uberaba	7	5	1	1	15	6	+9	11
2	(Rio de Janeiro (state)) Americano	7	4	2	1	17	7	+10	10
3	(São Paulo (state)) São Bento	7	4	2	1	11	8	+3	10
4	(Minas Gerais) América-MG	7	3	2	2	5	8	−3	8
5	(Rio de Janeiro (state)) América-RJ	7	3	1	3	6	7	−1	7
6	(São Paulo (state)) Comercial-SP	7	2	2	3	8	11	−3	6
7	(Rio de Janeiro (state)) Volta Redonda	7	1	1	5	8	11	−3	3
8	(Espírito Santo) Vitória	7	0	1	6	4	16	−12	1

=== Group F ===
Pos	Team	Pld	W	D	L	GF	GA	GD	Pts
1	(São Paulo (state)) Palmeiras	7	4	3	0	10	4	+6	11
2	(Mato Grosso do Sul) Comercial-MS	7	2	4	1	11	9	+2	8
3	(Rio Grande do Sul) Internacional de Santa Maria	7	3	1	3	11	11	0	7
4	(Rio Grande do Sul) São Paulo-RS	7	2	3	2	10	11	−1	7
5	(São Paulo (state)) Ferroviária	7	2	3	2	8	8	0	7
6	(Santa Catarina (state)) Criciúma	7	2	2	3	8	10	−2	6
7	(Rio Grande do Sul) Novo Hamburgo	7	2	2	3	8	11	−3	6
8	(São Paulo (state)) América-SP	7	1	2	4	7	9	−2	4

== Second phase ==
=== Group G ===
Pos	Team	Pld	W	D	L	GF	GA	GD	Pts	Promotion or qualification
1	Bahia	4	3	1	0	6	2	+4	7	Promoted to Second phase of Taça de Ouro
2	Remo	4	1	1	2	6	5	+1	3	Qualified to Semifinals
3	Botafogo-PB	4	0	2	2	2	7	−5	2	

=== Group H ===
Pos	Team	Pld	W	D	L	GF	GA	GD	Pts	Promotion or qualification
1	Náutico	4	2	2	0	7	5	+2	6	Promoted to Second phase of Taça de Ouro
2	Anapolina	4	2	1	1	7	5	+2	5	Qualified to Semifinals
3	Tuna Luso	4	0	1	3	3	7	−4	1	

=== Group I ===
Pos	Team	Pld	W	D	L	GF	GA	GD	Pts	Promotion or qualification
1	Palmeiras	4	2	1	1	5	3	+2	5	Promoted to Second phase of Taça de Ouro
2	Guarani	4	2	0	2	6	5	+1	4	Qualified to Semifinals
3	Americano	4	1	1	2	3	6	−3	3	

=== Group G ===
Pos	Team	Pld	W	D	L	GF	GA	GD	Pts	Promotion or qualification
1	Uberaba	4	1	3	0	3	2	+1	5	Promoted to Second phase of Taça de Ouro
2	Comercial-MS	4	1	2	1	4	6	−2	4	Qualified to Semifinals
3	Coritiba	4	1	1	2	4	3	+1	3	

== Semifinals ==
Team 1	Agg.	Team 2	1st leg	2nd leg
Comercial-MS	1-5	Guarani	1-2	0-3
Remo	5-7	Anapolina	2-3	3-4

== Finals ==
=== First leg ===
21 March 1981

Anapolina (Goiás)	2 – 4	(São Paulo (state)) Guarani
Nei 48'; Fernando 60'		Careca 3', 12'; Lúcio 15'; Miranda 63'

Jonas Duarte, Anápolis (GO)
Attendance: 8,595
Referee: (Minas Gerais) Maurílio José Santiago

=== Second leg ===
27 March 1981

Guarani (São Paulo (state))	1 – 1	(Goiás) Anapolina
Marcelo 21'		Osmário 90'

Brinco de Ouro, Campinas (SP)
Attendance: 12,4452
Referee: (Bahia) Manuel Serapião Filho

== Sources ==
- RSSSF
