= Marcelo Vita =

Brazilian footballer

Personal information
- Full name: Marcelo Gonçalves Vita
- Date of birth: 19 February 1963 (age 63)
- Place of birth: Mococa, Brazil
- Position: Forward

Youth career
- Guarani

Senior career*
Years	Team	Apps	(Gls)
1981–1983	Guarani		
1983–1984	Vasco da Gama	51	(20)
1985	Udinese		
1985–1989	Internacional	94	(45)
1990	Blumenau		
1991	Vitória		
1991	Botafogo-SP		
1991–1992	Araçatuba		
1992	Joinville		
1992	Inter de Limeira		
1993	Botafogo-SP		
1993	Joinville		
1993	Bandeirante		
1994	Pelotas		
1994	União Bandeirante		
1995	Pelotas		

International career
1981	Brazil U20		

Managerial career
- 2009: Inter de Bebedouro
- 2010: Radium
- 2012: Radium
- * Club domestic league appearances and goals as of 1 June 2024

Marcelo Gonçalves Vita (born 19 February 1963), simply known as Marcelo Vita, is a Brazilian former professional footballer and manager who played as a forward.

== Playing career ==
Revealed in the Guarani youth categories, Marcelo Vita made history by scoring the winning goal in the 1981 Silver Cup (currently Série B). He was traded to Vasco da Gama where he won the Taça Rio in 1984 and was runner-up in Brazilian championship. Traded with Udinese in 1985, he played little due to the excess of foreign players, being traded to Internacional where he remained from 1985 to 1989, when suffered a serious knee injury. Vita played for several clubs in the 1990s, with emphasis on AE Araçatuba, where he won the second level of São Paulo, and EC Pelotas, where he ended his career.

Vita was part of the Brazil under-20 squad that competed in the 1981 FIFA World Youth Championship.

== Managerial career ==
He had a modest coaching career, managing Inter de Bebedouro in 2009 and Radium de Mococa on two occasions, in 2010 and 2012.

== Honours ==
Guarani

- Campeonato Brasileiro Série B: 1981

Vasco da Gama

- Taça Rio: 1984

Araçatuba

- Campeonato Paulista Série A2: 1991
