= Duke of Buccleugh (1831 ship) =

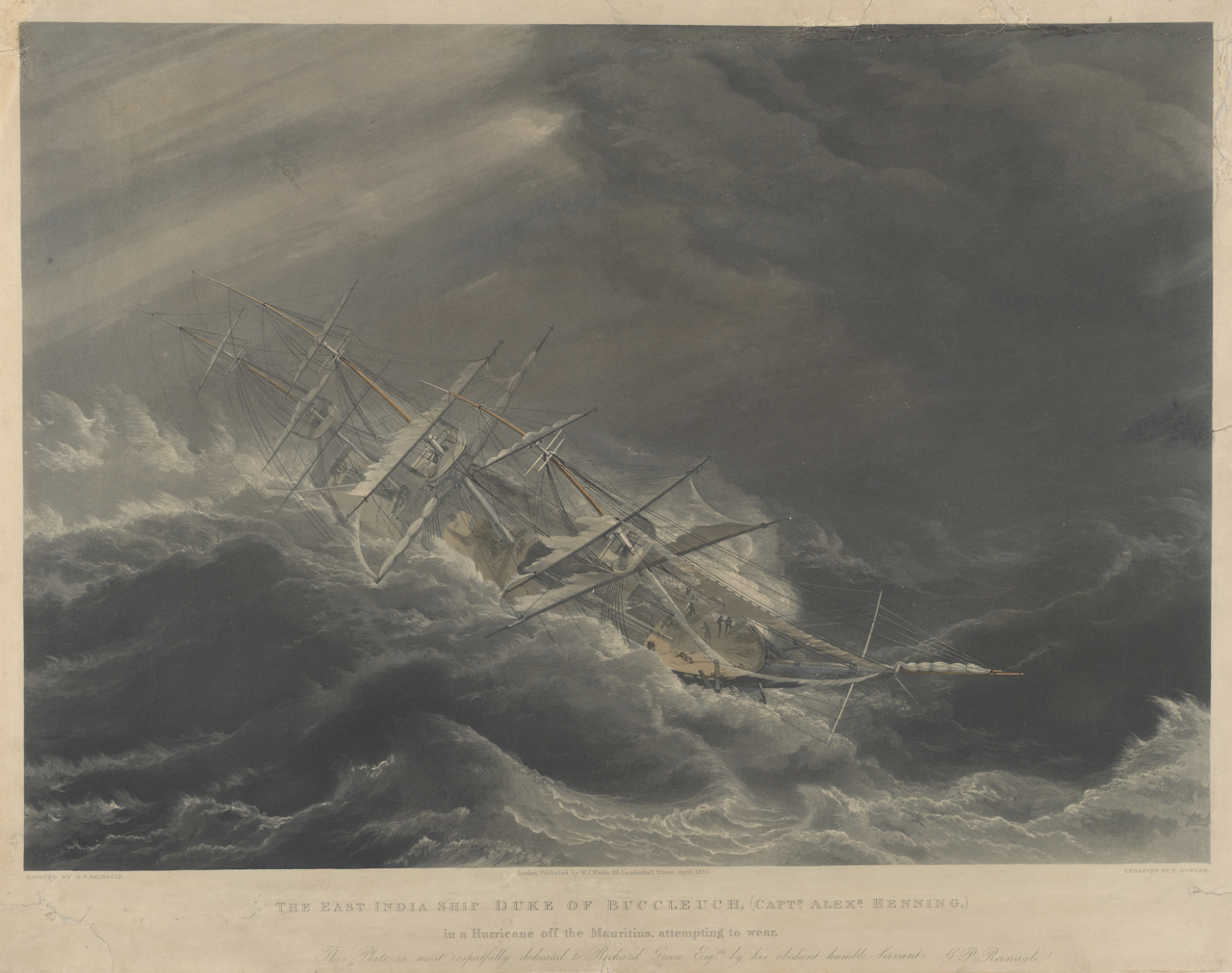
- The East India Ship 'Duke of Buccleuch', (Captn Alexr Henning) in a Hurricane off the Mauritius, attempting to wear; George Philip Reinagle, Edward Duncan, & W.J. Wade – National Maritime Museum, Greenwich

History

United Kingdom
- Name: Duke of Buccleugh
- Namesake: Duke of Buccleuch
- Owner: Robert Green
- Builder: Green, Wigram's & Green, at Blackwall.
- Launched: 14 April 1831
- Fate: Wrecked 7 February 1840

General characteristics
- Tons burthen: 5761/94 or 6182/94, or 619 (bm)
- Length: 135 ft 6 in (41.3 m)
- Beam: 31 ft 7 in (9.6 m)
- Depth of hold: 10 ft 6 in (3.2 m)

Duke of Buccleugh was an East Indiaman launched in 1831. She made one voyage for the British East India Company (EIC) and then traded between England and India until she was lost in February 1840.

EIC voyage (1831–1832): The EIC chartered on 29 April 1831, for £8 9s per ton for a voyage to Bengal and return. Captain Alexander Henning sailed from the Downs on 10 June. Duke of Buccleugh reached Madras on 22 September, and arrived at Calcutta on 10 October. Homeward bound, she was at Madras on 18 January 1832 and the Cape on 10 March. She reached St Helena on 30 March and arrived back at her moorings on 8 May.

From 1832 to 1840 Duke of Buccleugh was in private trade to India.

Fate: Duke of Buccleugh, McCloud, master, was wrecked on 7 February 1840, on Point Palmyras Reef (20°44′40″N 87°2′00″E). She was carrying 74 recruits, five women, and one child; one of the recruits died. Miranda rescued the survivors. Duke of Buccleuch was on a voyage from London to Calcutta.
