= Miranda (1829 ship) =

History

United Kingdom
- Name: Miranda
- Launched: 1829, Liverpool
- Fate: Condemned 1840

General characteristics
- Tons burthen: 250, or 289, or 290 (bm)

Miranda was launched in Liverpool in 1829 as a West Indiaman. She was condemned at Calcutta in 1840.

== Career ==
Miranda first appeared in Lloyd's Register (LR) in 1829.

Year	Master	Owner	Trade	Source
1829	J.Taggart	Quayle & Co.	Liverpool–Demerara	LR
1834	W.Syms			
1839	Murdock; A.Thompson	D.Sharp	Clyde–Antigua; Clyde–Calcutta	LR

By 1839 Miranda's homeport was Greenock, and she was trading with Calcutta.

When Duke of Buccleugh, McCloud, master, was wrecked on 7 February 1840 on Point Palmyras Reef, Miranda rescued the survivors.

== Fate ==
Miranda, Thompson, master, arrived at Calcutta from the Clyde on 14 February. On 19 March she sailed for London but on 11 April she put back into Calcutta, leaky.

Miranda, Thompson, master, was condemned at Calcutta in 1840 after again having put back on 11 August. Her hull was sold for Rupees 5,000.

Year	Master	Owner	Trade	Source
1840	A.Thompson	D.Sharp	Calcutta	LR; "condemned"
