= Miranda Lubbers =

Dutch social scientist (born 1973)

Miranda J. Lubbers (born in Emmen, 1973) is a Dutch social scientist specializing in the analysis of migration, segregation, and social identity through personal networks. She is Professor in Anthropology at the Department of Social and Cultural Anthropology of the Autonomous University of Barcelona, and director of the COALESCE Lab.

== Education and career ==
Lubbers studied sociology at the University of Groningen, completing her Ph.D. in Behavioral and Social Sciences there in 2004. She remained at the University of Groningen for two more years as a postdoctoral researcher, and then spent one year as a lecturer at the University of Rovira i Virgili before moving to the Autonomous University of Barcelona as a researcher, since 2015 as an associate professor, and since 2023 as full professor. Her research concerns how personal networks reproduce, exacerbate, or mitigate social exclusion, inequality, and segregation. Since 2021, she conducts the research project "A network science approach to social cohesion in European societies" (PATCHWORK), for which she received the ERC Advanced Grant of the European Research Council. Lubbers is an associate editor of the journal Social Networks and editorial board member of Social Inclusion. She was a member of the Board of Directors of the International Network for Social Network Analysis from 2019 to 2022.

== Book ==
Lubbers is the coauthor of the book Conducting Personal Network Research: A Practical Guide (Guilford Press, 2019, with Christopher McCarty, Raffaele Vacca, and José Luis Molina).

== Honours ==
In 2020, Lubbers was elected as ICREA Acadèmia fellow of the Catalan Institution for Research and Advanced Studies. In 2022, she was elected to the European Academy of Sociology.
