= Lúcio Bala (footballer, born 1955) =

Brazilian footballer

Personal information
- Full name: Lúcio Alves Pompeu de Campos
- Date of birth: 2 October 1955 (age 71)
- Place of birth: Várzea Grande, Brazil
- Height: 1.69 m (5 ft 7 in)
- Position: Right winger

Youth career
- –1971: Independente-MT
- 1971: Dom Bosco

Senior career*
Years	Team	Apps	(Gls)
1971–1975	Dom Bosco		
1974	→ Palmeiras-MT (loan)		
1975–1980	Ponte Preta	205	(33)
1980–1981	Palmeiras	43	(3)
1981–1983	Guarani	133	(18)
1983–1984	Flamengo	34	(1)
1985–1986	America-RJ		
1985	→ Operário-MT (loan)		
1986–1987	Comercial-SP		
1987	Coritiba		
1987–1988	Bandeirante		
1988	ASA		
1989	Mixto		
- * Club domestic league appearances and goals as of 8 January 2024

Lúcio Alves Pompeu de Campos (born 2 October 1955), better known as Lúcio Bala, is a Brazilian former professional footballer who played as a right winger.

== Career ==
Lúcio played for the children's category of Independente de Várzea Grande, was observed by CE Dom Bosco and invited to the club's professional team. In 1974, due to Dom Bosco's financial problems, he was loaned to Palmeiras EC, a time when he almost abandoned football to work as a taxi driver. Therefore, he ended up being traded to AA Ponte Preta for a low fee, a club where he adapted quickly and became one of the most loved players by the fans. In 1980, his pass was sold to SE Palmeiras, team where little produced. He returned to Campinas, this time at Guarani, and was elected Silver Ball of the Brazilian championship in 1982. He also had a spell at Flamengo where he played 34 games and scored one goal.

== Honours ==
Dom Bosco

- Campeonato Mato-Grossense: 1971

Guarani

- Campeonato Brasileiro Série B: 1981

Operário-MT

- Campeonato Mato-Grossense: 1985

Individual

- 1982 Bola de Prata
