= False Point =

Coordinates: 20°21′25″N 86°47′56″E

Location of False Point in the Indian coast

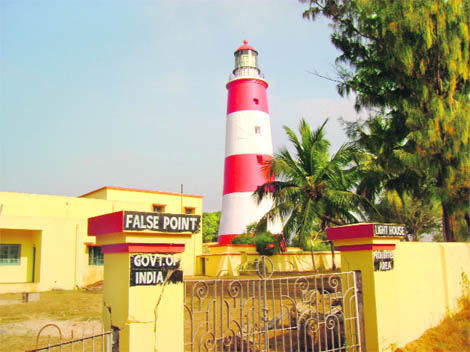
Lighthouse at False Point

False Point is a low headland in the Bay of Bengal. It is located in the Kendrapara district of Odisha, India. The point derives its name from the circumstance that vessels proceeding up the Bay of Bengal frequently mistook it for Point Palmyras, less than a degree farther north. A lighthouse is situated 2 km inland from the point, at a place which screens it from the southern monsoon.

== History ==
False Point is also the name of a harbor in the area. It was reported by the famine commissioners in 1867 to be the best harbour on the coast of India from the Hooghly to Bombay. The anchorage is safe, roomy and completely landlocked, but large vessels are obliged to lie out at some distance from its mouth in an exposed roadstead.

The capabilities of False Point as an anchorage remained long unknown, and it was only in 1860 that the port was opened. It was rapidly developed, owing to the construction of the Odisha canals. Two navigable channels lead inland across the Mahanadi delta and connect the port with Cuttack city. The trade of False Point was chiefly with other Indian harbours, but a large export trade in rice and oil-seeds sprung up with Mauritius, the French colonies and France. False Point was also a regular port of call for Anglo-Indian coasting steamers. Its capabilities were first appreciated during the Orissa famine of 1866, when it afforded almost the only means by which supplies of rice could be thrown into the province.

== See also ==
- Palmyras Point
