= HMS Miranda =

Three ships of the Royal Navy have been named HMS Miranda.

- HMS Miranda (1851) was a screw sloop launched in 1851. She was redesignated a corvette in 1862 and scrapped in 1869.
- HMS Miranda (1879) was an Doterel-class sloop launched in 1879 and sold in 1892.
- HMS Miranda (1914) was a M-class destroyer launched in 1914 and sold in 1921.
