= Miranda (footballer, born 1998) =

Brazilian footballer

Personal information
- Full name: Guilherme dos Santos Rodrigues
- Date of birth: 9 May 1998 (age 28)
- Place of birth: Alvorada, Brazil
- Position: Midfielder

Team information
- Current team: Estrela da Amadora
- Number: 33

Youth career
- 2017: Ferroviária
- 2018: Coritiba

Senior career*
Years	Team	Apps	(Gls)
2018–2020	Covilhã	40	(0)
2020–	Estrela da Amadora	11	(1)
- * Club domestic league appearances and goals as of 6 January 2022

Guilherme dos Santos Rodrigues (born 9 May 1998), commonly known as Miranda, is a Brazilian footballer who currently plays as a midfielder for Estrela da Amadora.

== Career statistics ==
=== Club ===
As of 4 April 2019.

Club	Season	League			Cup		Other		Total	
Club	Season	Division	Apps	Goals	Apps	Goals	Apps	Goals	Apps	Goals
Covilhã	2018–19	LigaPro	24	0	3 (Note: Appearances in the Taça de Portugal)	0	0	0	27	0
Career total			24	0	3	0	0	0	27	0
