= Miranda (footballer, born 1947) =

Brazilian footballer (1947–2022)

Personal information
- Full name: Deoclécio Manoel de Miranda
- Date of birth: 8 September 1947
- Place of birth: Presidente Prudente, Brazil
- Date of death: 25 July 2022 (aged 74)
- Place of death: Presidente Prudente, Brazil
- Position: Right back

Youth career
- Prudentina

Senior career*
Years	Team	Apps	(Gls)
1967–1969	Guarani		
1969–1973	Corinthians	143	(0)
1973–1977	Botafogo		
1978–1980	Fluminense	84	(0)
- * Club domestic league appearances and goals as of 30 September 2024

Deoclécio Manoel de Miranda (8 September 1947 – 25 July 2022), better known as Miranda, was a Brazilian professional footballer who played as a right back.

== Career ==
Miranda started his career at his hometown club, Prudentina. He also played for Guarani and in 1969 he joined Corinthians, where he made 143 appearances and played until 1973, when he was traded to Botafogo, where he remained until 1977. He played the last few years of his career for Fluminense, where he made 84 appearances.

== Personal life ==
Miranda is the elder brother of the footballer Donizete Manuel Onofre, who was also called Miranda. He died on 25 July 2022 in Presidente Prudente, victim of kidney failure.

== Honours ==
Corinthians

- Torneio Laudo Natel: 1973

Botafogo

- Taça Augusto Pereira da Motta: 1975

Fluminense

- Campeonato Carioca: 1980
- Copa Governador Faria Lima: 1977
