= Miranda (footballer, born 1957) =

Brazilian footballer

Personal information
- Full name: Donizete Manuel Onofre
- Date of birth: 30 May 1957 (age 69)
- Place of birth: Presidente Prudente, Brazil
- Position: Defender

Youth career
- Guarani

Senior career*
Years	Team	Apps	(Gls)
1975–1981	Guarani		
1981–1983	Atlético Mineiro	118	(1)
1984	Botafogo		
1985–1987	Avaí		
1988	Atlético Paranaense		
1988	Esportivo-MG		
1989	União Mogi		
1991	Fluminense de Feira		
- * Club domestic league appearances and goals as of 27 May 2024

Donizete Manuel Onofre (born 30 May 1957), better known as Miranda, is a Brazilian former professional footballer who played as a defender.

== Career ==
Ambidextrous and capable of playing in different positions in the defensive sector, Miranda began his career at Guarani, a team where he became famous for winning the Brazilian title in 1978. He later played for Atlético Mineiro, where he was three-time state champion. Miranda had more discreet spells at Botafogo FR and Avaí, in addition to representing Esportivo de Passos, União Mogi and Fluminense de Feira. After retiring, he worked as a technical assistant in the youth sectors at Portuguesa. Currently resides in Contagem, Minas Gerais.

== Personal life ==
Miranda is the younger brother of Deoclécio Manuel Miranda, who played for Corinthians, Botafogo and Guarani. Donizete received the nickname "Miranda" after his brother.

== Honours ==
Guarani

- Campeonato Brasileiro: 1978
- Campeonato Brasileiro Série B: 1981

Atlético Mineiro

- Campeonato Mineiro: 1981, 1982, 1983
- Berna International Tournament: 1983
