= Miranda Green (American journalist) =

American investigative journalist

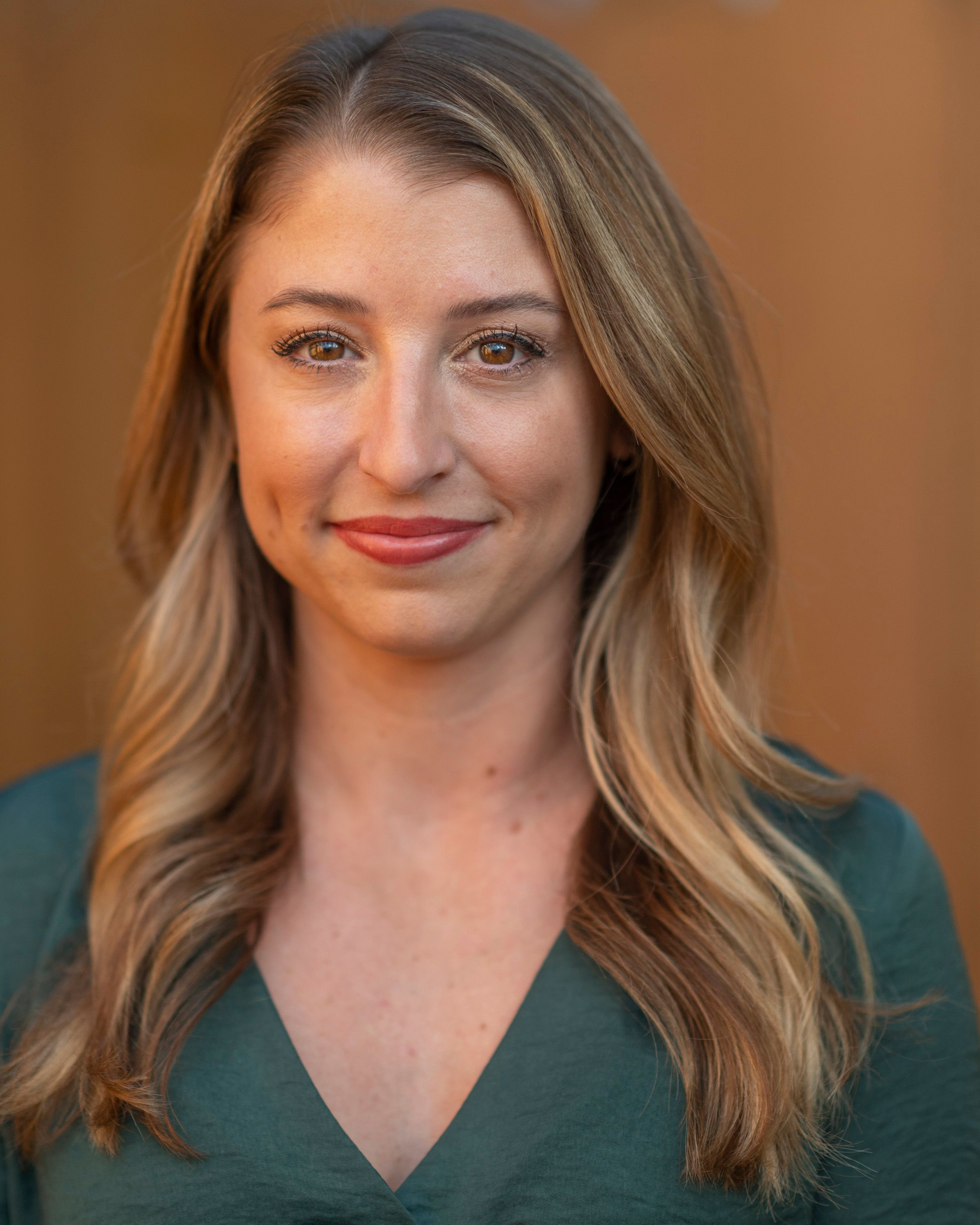
- Born: Los Angeles, California
- Education: George Washington University
- Occupation: Investigative Reporter
- Website: mirandacgreen.com

Miranda Green is an American investigative journalist who writes The Understory for Atmos. She was previously a reporter for HuffPost, Floodlight News, The Hill, CNN and The Daily Beast. Green is most known for her investigative stories covering climate change, misinformation and American politics.

== Early life and education ==
Green was born in Los Angeles, California and grew up in Santa Barbara, California. She attended college at George Washington University.

== Career ==
Green started her career in Washington, D.C. where she spent seven years covering climate and politics as a staff reporter at CNN, The Hill, and The Daily Beast. In 2016, she was the national political reporter at Scripps News where she covered the 2016 presidential election.

Green moved to Los Angeles in 2020 and has focused her reporting on climate change, misinformation and corruption.

Her reporting has appeared in The Washington Post, New York Magazine, The New York Times and The Atlantic. Stories she’s written include an investigation into Lincoln Project founder John Weaver’s lascivious conversations with young men he hired; A deep dive into Donald Trump’s former Interior Secretary Ryan Zinke’s race to get back to D.C.; and reporting on the future of ‘Lithium Valley’ and the environmentally impacted residents living in California’s Salton Sea.

A story she wrote for New York Magazine in May 2023, about the largest jewelry heist in modern history, is currently under development-to be made into a feature film. In 2021 she was a finalist for the Susan M. Haas Fellowship, launched by the Academy Award winning director Cord Jefferson, for journalists breaking into show writing.

A two-part series she co-reported with NPR was chosen as a finalist for the 2023 Goldsmith Prize for Investigative Reporting and won the Los Angeles Press Club’s award on misinformation. A story from the series won first place for the 2024 Southern Environmental Law Center’s Reed Award for reporting on the environment. Her joint Floodlight/NPR investigation into a grassroots seeming anti-solar group that had ties to a conservative political activist won second place in the 2024 National Headliner Awards for investigative collaborations. It is also a finalist for the 2024 Los Angeles Press Club Award for digital investigations.
