= Palmyras Point =

Coordinates: 20°45′15″N 87°05′36″E

Location of Palmyras Point in the Indian coast

Palmyras Point or Point Palmyras is a low headland in the Bay of Bengal. It is located at the eastern end of the Brahmani River delta in the state of Odisha, India, close to the Bhitarkanika wildlife sanctuary, an area of mangroves.

False Point, located further south, derives its name from the circumstance that vessels proceeding up the Bay of Bengal frequently mistook it for Point Palmyras.

== See also ==
- False Point
- Bhitarkanika Mangroves
