= 14th century in poetry =

== Aztec Empire ==
- 14th century — Tlaltecatzin of Cuauhchinanco (Texcoco (altepetl)) writes his poem.
- late 14th-mid 15th centuries — Tochimhuitzin of Coyolchighuihqui (Tenochtitlan), son of Itcoatl writes several poems in Nahuatl.

== Europe ==
- 1323 – The name Pléiade is adopted by a group of fourteen poets (seven men and seven women) in Toulouse.
- 1360 – The future English poet Geoffrey Chaucer is captured by the French during the Reims campaign of the Hundred Years' War and ransomed by King Edward III of England.

=== Works ===
- The Divine Comedy, written by Dante Alighieri c.1308-21 in the Tuscan dialect of Italian.
- Petrarch writes the Africa in Latin, for which he was crowned Poet Laureate, and the Canzoniere in Italian, critical in the development of the sonnet tradition.
- Der Busant written in Middle High German, early 14th century; earliest surviving manuscript fragment c.1380.
- Lamentations of Mary, first recorded Hungarian language poem, is transcribed at the beginning of the century.
- Eric's Chronicle, written sometime between 1320 and 1332 by an unknown author, Sweden.
- 1310–1314 – Roman de Fauvel written by Gervais de Bus and Chaillou de Pesstain, France.
- 1330–1343 – The Book of Good Love (El Libro de Buen Amor) written by Juan Ruiz, Archpriest of Hita, Spain (Castile).
- 1398 – Anselm Turmeda, also known as "Abdullah at-Tarjuman" عبد الله الترجمان, Llibre dels bons amonestaments, Spanish work by a poet who later converts to Islam and writes in Arabic.

=== British Isles ===
- 1327 – The deposed King Edward II of England perhaps writes the "Lament of Edward II".
- After 1350 – The Pearl Poet writes Sir Gawain and the Green Knight in Northern England.
- c. 1367 (earliest likely date) – William Langland (presumably) writes Piers Plowman.
- Late 1368? – Geoffrey Chaucer composes his first major poem, The Book of the Duchess.
- 1375 – Barbour composes The Brus, the earliest poem in vernacular Early Scots.
- 1381: May 30–November – Peasants' Revolt in England. Preacher John Ball apparently cites the poem Piers Plowman (which is revised during this decade) and John Gower includes an account of the events in his Vox Clamantis.
- 1386: October – Geoffrey Chaucer is obliged to give up most of his official offices in London and retires to Kent (in South East England) where he may work on The Canterbury Tales.
- Hendregadredd Manuscript, containing the Welsh Poetry of the Princes anthology, and the Red Book of Hergest, another important Welsh literary manuscript.

== Near East ==
- Yusuf Meddah, Azerbaijani, writes Varqa va Gülşāh, Ghazavātnāmah, Dāstān-i Iblīs 'Aleyh al-La'nah (translated from Arabic and expanded) and Qiṣṣah-i Yūsuf
- Şadi Meddah, probably writes Maqtal-i Hüseyn (1362, translated from Arabic)
- Khāmūshnāmah (c. 1300)

== Arab world ==
- Ibn Juzayy (1321–1340)
- Safi al-din al-Hilli, (died c. 1339)
- Ibn Nubatah al-Misri, (died 1366)
- Anselm Turmeda, also known as "Abd-Allah at-Tarjuman" (1355–1423), Catalan Spanish, then Arabic poet

== Persian language ==
=== Works ===
- Amir Khusrow, Hasht-Bihisht (c. 1302)

=== Persian-language poets ===
- Hafez, poet (born about 1310-1325)
- Rashid-al-Din Hamadani, Jewish convert into Islam (1247-1318)
- Shams Tabrizi
- Khwaju Kermani
- Mahmoud Shabestari
- Ubayd Zakani
- Shahin Shirazi
- Junayd Shirazi
- Kamal od-Din Esmail
- Jamal ad-Din Isfahani
- Awhadi Maraghai
- Ghiyas al-Din ibn Rashid al-Din
- Shah Nimatullah Wali
- Amir Khusrow, Sufi, writing in Persian and Hindustani (1253-1325)

== Japan ==
=== Japanese works published ===
Imperial poetry anthologies:

- Gyokuyō Wakashū
- Shokusenzai Wakashū
- Shokugoshūi Wakashū
- Fūga Wakashū
- Shinsenzai Wakashū
- Shinshūi Wakashū
- Shingoshūi Wakashū

=== Japanese poets ===
- Asukai Gayu 飛鳥井雅有, also known as "Asukai Masaari" (1241–1301), Kamakura period nobleman and poet; has 86 poems in the official anthology Shokukokin Wakashū
- Chūgan Engetsu (1300–1375), poet and Zen Buddhist monk of the Rinzai sect who headed many Zen establishments
- Eifuku-mon In 永福門院, also written "Eifuku Mon'in", also known as Saionji Shōko 西園寺しょう子, 西園寺鏱子 (1271–1342) Kamakura period poet and a consort of the 92nd emperor, Fushimi; she belonged to the Kyōgoku school of verse; has poems in the Gyokuyōshū anthology
- Ikkyū 一休宗純, Ikkyū Sōjun (1394–1481), eccentric, iconic, Rinzai Zen Buddhist priest, poet and sometime mendicant flute player who influenced Japanese art and literature with an infusion of Zen attitudes and ideals; one of the creators of the formal Japanese tea ceremony; well known to Japanese children through various stories and the subject of a popular Japanese children's television program; made a character in anime fiction
- Jakushitsu Genkō 寂室元光 (1290–1367), Rinzai Zen master, poet, flute player, and first abbot of Eigen-ji, which was constructed solely for him to teach Zen
- Jien 慈円 (1155–1225) poet, historian, and Buddhist monk
- Jinzai Kiyoshi 神西清 (1903–1957) Shōwa period novelist, translator, literary critic, poet and playwright
- Munenaga 宗良 親王 (1311 – c. 1385) Nanboku-chō period imperial prince (eighth son of Emperor Godaigo) and poet of the Nijō poetic school who is known for his compilation of the Shin'yō Wakashū poetry anthology
- Sesson Yūbai 雪村友梅 (1290–1348), poet and Buddhist priest of the Rinzai sect who founded temples
- Shōtetsu 正徹 (1381–1459), considered by some the last great poet in the courtly waka tradition; his disciples were important in the development of renga, which led to haiku
- Ton'a 頓阿 also spelled as "Tonna"; lay name: Nikaidō Sadamune 二階堂貞宗 (1289–1372), poet and Buddhist monk

== Other in East Asia ==
- Yi Saek (1328–1395), Korea
- U Tak (1262–1342), Korea
- Zhao Luanluan (fl. 1341–1367), Yuan dynasty Chinese female erotic poet (death by sati)

== South Asia ==
- Vemana (Gona Budda Reddy, fl. c.1300–1310) translates Ranganatha ramayan (శ్రీ రంగనాథ రామాయణం) into Telugu
- Yerrapragada (fl. c.1325–1350) concludes translation of Mahabharata as Andhra Mahabharatam into Telugu
- Janabai (d. 1350), female Marathi religious poet in the Hindu tradition
- Srinatha (1365–1450), Telugu, popularizes the Prabhanda style
- Nund Rishi (1377–1440), Indian, Kashmiri-language poet

== Decades and years ==
1290s	1290	1291	1292	1293	1294	1295	1296	1297	1298	1299
1300s	1300	1301	1302	1303	1304	1305	1306	1307	1308	1309
1310s	1310	1311	1312	1313	1314	1315	1316	1317	1318	1319
1320s	1320	1321	1322	1323	1324	1325	1326	1327	1328	1329
1330s	1330	1331	1332	1333	1334	1335	1336	1337	1338	1339
1340s	1340	1341	1342	1343	1344	1345	1346	1347	1348	1349
1350s	1350	1351	1352	1353	1354	1355	1356	1357	1358	1359
1360s	1360	1361	1362	1363	1364	1365	1366	1367	1368	1369
1370s	1370	1371	1372	1373	1374	1375	1376	1377	1378	1379
1380s	1380	1381	1382	1383	1384	1385	1386	1387	1388	1389
1390s	1390	1391	1392	1393	1394	1395	1396	1397	1398	1399
1400s	1400	1401	1402	1403	1404	1405	1406	1407	1408	1409
