= 1513 in poetry =

List of years in poetry	(table)
- … 1503; 1504; 1505; 1506; 1507; 1508; 1509; 1510; 1511; 1512; 1513; 1514; 1515; 1516; 1517; 1518; 1519; 1520; 1521; 1522; 1523 …
- In literature 1510 1511 1512 1513 1514 1515 1516
- Art; Archaeology; Architecture; Literature; Music; Philosophy; Science; +...

Nationality words link to articles with information on the nation's poetry or literature (for instance, Irish or France).

== Events ==
- Gavin Douglas completed the Eneados, a complete Scots translation of Virgil's Aeneid and the first full and faithful translation into any Germanic language of a major poem from classical antiquity.
- John Skelton appointed Poet Laureate by Henry VIII of England

== Works published ==
=== Great Britain ===
- Anonymous, Ars amatoria, translated from the Latin of Ovid's Art of Love
- John Lydgate, published anonymously, Troy Book, verse paraphrase of Guido delle Colonne's Historia destructionis Troiae of 1287, in turn a Latin prose translation of the Roman de Troie (c. 1165) of Benoit de Sainte-Maure (see also The Life and Death of Hector 1614)
- John Skelton, published anonymously, A Ballade of the Scottysshe Kynge, celebrating the defeat of the Scots at Flodden

=== Other ===
- Mallanarya of Gubbi, Bhava Chintaratna, India
- Tito Vespasiano Strozzi, Strozii poëtae pater et filius, his complete works together with works of his son; published by Aldus Manutius, Italy

== Births ==
Death years link to the corresponding "[year] in poetry" article:

- December 23 – Sir Thomas Smith (died 1577), English scholar, diplomat and poet

== Deaths ==
Birth years link to the corresponding "[year] in poetry" article:

- January – Hans Folz (born c. 1437), German Meistersinger
- Henry Bradshaw (born c. 1450), English
- Robert Fabyan (birth year not known), English chronicler and sheriff
- Bartolomeo Fonzio (born c. 1445), Italian, Latin-language poet
- Naldo Naldi died about this year (born 1436), Italian, Latin-language poet

== See also ==
- Poetry
- 16th century in poetry
- 16th century in literature
- French Renaissance literature
- Grands Rhétoriqueurs
- Renaissance literature
- Spanish Renaissance literature
