= 1501 in poetry =

List of years in poetry	(table)
- … 1491; 1492; 1493; 1494; 1495; 1496; 1497; 1498; 1499; 1500; 1501; 1502; 1503; 1504; 1505; 1506; 1507; 1508; 1509; 1510; 1511 …
- In literature 1498 1499 1500 1501 1502 1503 1504
- Art; Archaeology; Architecture; Literature; Music; Philosophy; Science; +...

Nationality words link to articles with information on the nation's poetry or literature (for instance, Irish or France).

== Events ==
- Gavin Douglas, Scottish poet, writes The Palice of Honour, approximately this year (published about 1535); an allegory presented as a vision
- Marko Marulić, Croatian poet, writes Judita ("Judith"), a landmark poem in Croatian literature; the book was not printed until 1521 in Venice by Guglielmo da Fontaneto; and published three times before the author's death in 1524

== Works published ==
- Conradus Celtis, Ludus Diannae, allegorical verse drama, German poet who wrote in Latin
- Petrarch ("Francesco Petrarca"), Le cose volgari influential edition of the author's Italian poems, edited by Pietro Bembo, Venice: Aldine Press, Italy, posthumous

== Births ==
Death years link to the corresponding "[year] in poetry" article:

- Maurice Scève, born about this year (died c. 1564), French poet
- Garcilaso de la Vega (died 1536), Spanish soldier and poet
- Basilio Zanchi, born about this year (died 1558/59), Italian, Latin-language poet

== Deaths ==
Birth years link to the corresponding "[year] in poetry" article:

- January 3 – Ali-Shir Nava'i, also known as "Mir Alisher Navoï", (born c. 1441), philosopher and Persian-Uzbek poetry poet during the Timurid Renaissance
- September 26 – Džore Držić (born 1461), Croatian poet and playwright
- Also:
  - Gabriele Altilio (born 1436), Italian, Latin-language poet
  - Amerigo Corsini (born 1442), Italian, Latin-language poet
  - Olivier de la Marche died this year or 1502 (born 1426), French poet and author
  - Michael Marullus also known as "Michele Marullo" (born 1453, or about that year), Italian, Latin-language poet
  - Jean Michel (born unknown), French dramatic poet

== See also ==
- Poetry
- 16th century in poetry
- 16th century in literature
- French Renaissance literature
- Grands Rhétoriqueurs
- Renaissance literature
- Spanish Renaissance literature
