= 1380s in poetry =

List of years in poetry	(table)
- … 1375; 1376; 1377; 1378; 1379; 1380; 1381; 1382; 1383; 1384; 1385; 1386; 1387; 1388; 1389; 1390; 1391; 1392; 1393; 1394; 1395 …
- In literature 1382 1383 1384 1385 1386 1387 1388
- Art; Archaeology; Architecture; Literature; Music; Philosophy; Science; +...

Nationality words link to articles with information on the nation's poetry or literature (for instance, Irish or France).

== Events ==
1386:

- Venetian ambassador Lorenzo de Monacis writes a poem defending Hungarian queens Mary and Elizabeth from charges of murdering Charles II of Hungary.

== Works published ==
- Piruç myò doç inculurit, Friulian language (probably 1380)
- Geoffrey Chaucer, Troilus and Criseyde (exact year uncertain)

== Births ==
Death years link to the corresponding "[year] in poetry" article. There are conflicting or unreliable sources for the birth years of many people born in this period; where sources conflict, the poet is listed again and the conflict is noted:

1380:

- Laurent de Premierfait (died 1418), Latin poet, humanist and translator
- Azari Tusi (died 1462), Persian poet

1381:

- Krittibas Ojha (died 1461), Bengali poet
- Shōtetsu (died 1459), Japanese Waka poet

1387:

- Badr Shirvani (died 1450), Persian poet

1388:

- Nguyễn Trãi (died 1442), Vietnamese Confucian scholar, poet, politician and tactician

== Deaths ==
Birth years link to the corresponding "[year] in poetry" article:

1385:

- Munenaga (born 1311), imperial prince and a poet of the Nijō poetic school of Nanboku-chō period

1388:

- Gidō Shūshin (born 1325), Japanese luminary of the Zen Rinzai sect, was a master of poetry and prose in Chinese

== See also ==
- Poetry
- 14th century in poetry
- 14th century in literature
- List of years in poetry
- Grands Rhétoriqueurs
- French Renaissance literature
- Renaissance literature
- Spanish Renaissance literature

Other events:

- Other events of the 14th century
- Other events of the 15th century

15th century:

- 15th century in poetry
- 15th century in literature
