= 1535 in poetry =

Nationality words link to articles with information on the nation's poetry or literature (for instance, Irish or France).

== Events ==
- Baptista Mantuanus' Eclogues prescribed for schoolboys studying Latin poetry in Braunschweig; at the same time, the work is used in schools in Nördlingen, Memmingen and Emmerich

== Works published ==
- Anonymous, The Ploughman's tale, publication year uncertain; likely composed in the 15th century; misattributed to Chaucier in Thynne's edition of his works 1532
- Niccolò Carmignano, Operette del Parthenopeo Suavio, first book printed in Bari
- Gavin Douglas, The Palice of Honour, publication year uncertain; written about 1501; an allegory presented as a vision
- Jacopo Sannazaro, an Italian writing here in Latin:
  - almost 150 epigrams; published posthumously (died 1530)
  - Elegies in three books, imitating Propertius and Tibullus
- Maurice Scève, a translation into French of the sequel by Juan de Flores to Boccaccio's Fiammetta
- Marco Girolamo Vida, Christiados libri sex ("The Christiad in Six Books"), a Latin epic poem begun by Vida, an Italian bishop, in the 1510s but not completed until the early 1530s

== Births ==
Death years link to the corresponding "[year] in poetry" article:

- February 16 – Nicolas Rapin (died 1608), French magistrate, royal officer, translator, poet and satirist
- Also:
  - Cyprian Bazylik (died 1600), Polish composer, poet, printer, and writer
  - Martín del Barco Centenera (died c. 1602) Spanish cleric, explorer, author and poet
  - Simwnt Fychan (died 1606), Welsh language poet and genealogist
  - George Gascoigne (died 1577), English poet
  - Arthur Golding (died 1606), English translator of prose and poetry; nothing known of him after this year
  - Govindadasa (died 1613), Bengali Vaishnava poet known for his body of devotional songs addressed to Krishna
  - Jasper Heywood (died 1598), English poet and translator
  - Riccardo Luisini (died 1617), Italian, Latin-language poet
  - Martin Rakovský (died 1579), Slovak
  - Gioanni Hercolani de' Sarti, fl. at this time, Italian, Latin-language poet

== Deaths ==
Birth years link to the corresponding "[year] in poetry" article:

- May 26 – Francesco Berni, (born 1497), Italian writer and poet
- August 27 – Lope de Vega died (born 1462), Spain
- September 25 – Johannes Secundus (born 1511), Dutch, Latin-language poet
- Also:
  - Girolamo Angeriano, also known as "Hieronymus Angerianus" born sometime between about 1470 and about 1490, Italian, Latin-language poet; sources differ on his birth year, with some stating 1470, others giving c. 1480 and another c. 1490
  - Hieronymus Balbus, also called "Girolamo Balbi" and "Accellini", death year uncertain (born c. 1450), Italian Renaissance humanist, poet, diplomat, and bishop
  - Pedro Manuel Jiménez de Urrea, (born 1486), Spanish Renaissance poet and playwright

== See also ==
- Poetry
- 16th century in poetry
- 16th century in literature
- French Renaissance literature
- Renaissance literature
- Spanish Renaissance literature
