= 1460s in poetry =

[O]u sont les neiges d'antan
("Where are the snows of yesteryear?")

— François Villon, the "Ballade des Dams du Temps Jadis" in Le Grand Testament, 1461

Nationality words link to articles with information on the nation's poetry or literature (for instance, Irish or France).

== Events ==
- 1462: 10 September – Robert Henryson in Scotland is enrolled as a teacher in the recently founded University of Glasgow.
- 1463: January – French poet François Villon is reprieved from hanging but never heard of again.

== Works published ==
1461:

- François Villon, Le Grand Testament, lyric poem; France consisting of 173 stanzas containing many ballads, or rondeaux, including "Ballade des dames du Temps Jadis" (see quotation, above)

1463:

- Matteo Maria Boiardo, Carmina de Laudibus Estensium, Italy

1468:

- Jami, Haft Owrang ("Seven Thrones"), collection of seven idylls (masnavi); Afghanistan poet who wrote in Persian

== Births ==
Death years link to the corresponding "[year] in poetry" article:

1460:

- Cornelio Paolo Amalteo born about this year (died 1517), Italian, Latin-language poet
- Alessandro Cortesi (died 1490), Italian, Latin-language poet
- William Dunbar, born about this year (died c. 1520), Scottish
- Robert Henryson, year uncertain, Scottish makar poet who flourished from this year until 1500
- Gwerful Mechain born about this year (died 1502), Welsh erotic poet, a woman
- John Skelton (died 1529), English

1461:

- February 6 – Džore Držić (died 1501), Croatian poet and playwright

1462:

- Robert Henryson, Scottish makar poet who flourished from about this year until roughly 1500
- John Skelton born about this year (died c. 1529), English
- Fausto Andrelino born about this year (died c. 1517), Italian, Latin-language poet
- Lope de Vega (died 1535), Spain

1463:

- C. Aurelio Cambini (died sometime after 1494), Italian, Latin-language poet
- Giovanni Pico della Mirandola (died 1494), Italian, Latin-language poet
- Antonio Tebaldeo (died 1537), Italian poet who wrote in both Italian and Latin

1464:

- Giannantonio Flaminio (died 1536), Italian, Latin-language poet

1465:

- September 11 – Bernardo Accolti (died 1536), Italian
- Girolamo Carbone born about this year (died sometime after 1527), Italian, Latin-language poet
- Serafino Ciminelli, also known as "Serafino Aquilano" (died 1500), Italian poet, singer, author and actor
- Cassandra Fedele, born about this year (died 1558), Italian, Latin-language poet
- Biernat of Lublin Polish: "Biernat z Lublina", born about this year (died sometime after 1529), Polish
- Gil Vicente born about this year (died c. 1536), Portuguese poet and playwright
- Yamazaki Sōkan (died 1553), Japanese renga and haikai poet

1467:

- Girolamo Amaseo (died 1517), Italian, Latin-language poet
- Octavien de Saint-Gelais (died 1502), French churchman, poet and translator

1468:

- July 12 – Juan del Encina (sources differ on his death year, with one giving late 1529 or early 1530 and others 1533; or 1534), Spanish poet, musician and playwright
- Octavien de Saint-Gelais (died 1502), French churchman, poet and translator

1469:

- Giacomo Bon (died 1538), Italian, Latin-language poet
- Niccolò Machiavelli (died 1527), Italian philosopher, writer, poet, musician, and politician
- Francesco Di Natale (died 1542), Italian, Latin-language poet
- Giovanni Francesco Pico (died 1533), Italian, Latin-language poet

== Deaths ==
Birth years link to the corresponding "[year] in poetry" article:

1461:

- Martin le Franc (born 1410), French poet of the late Middle Ages and early Renaissance
- Krittibas Ojha (born 1381), medieval Bengali poet

1462:

- Azari Tusi (born 1380), Persian poet

1463:

- March 6 – Saint Catherine of Bologna (born 1413), Italian saint, abbess, visionary, calligrapher, miniaturist and poet
- François Villon died sometime after January 5 (born c. 1431), French poet, thief and vagabond

1465:

- January 5 – Charles, Duke of Orléans (born 1394), French
- Pierre Michault (born 1405)

1469:

- Ubertino Pusculo died about this year (born 1431), Italian, Latin-language poet

== See also ==
- Poetry
- 15th century in poetry
- 15th century in literature
