= 1470s in poetry =

This article covers 1470s in poetry. Nationality words link to articles with information on the nation's poetry or literature (for instance, Irish or France).

== Works published ==
1472-1473:

- Zainuddin, Rasul Bijay ("Victory of the Messenger"), fiction, Bengali

1475:

- Angelo Polizano, Stanzas Begun for the Tournament of the Magnificent Giuliano de Medici, publication year uncertain, published sometime from 1475–1478 Italy

1476:

- Benet Burgh, Parvus Cato; Magnus Cato, collection of maxims written about 1440 and attributed to Dionysius Cato; the book was widely used as an elementary textbook; Latin and English
- Jami, Nahafat al-Uns ("Breath of Familiarity"), biographies, Persian
- John Lydgate, Great Britain, all posthumous editions:
  - The Chorle and the Birdie, published anonymously, written about 1400 and circulated widely as manuscripts
  - The Horse, the Goose, and the Sheep, published anonymously, publication year uncertain, probably written soon after 1436
  - Stans Puer ad Mensam, publication year uncertain; the most popular version of this Medieval "courtesy" book educating boys on proper mealtime etiquette

1477:

- Geoffrey Chaucer, all posthumous editions:
  - Anelida and Arcite, published anonymously, publication year uncertain; includes other short poems by the author
  - Canterbury Tales (see also the edition of 1526)
  - The Parliament of Fowls, published anonymously, publication year uncertain, includes other short poems by the author
- Blind Harry, The Actes and Deidis of the Illustre and Vallyeant Campioun Schir William Wallace, also known as The Wallace, long Scottish "romantic biographical" poem in Middle Scots, probably created some time in the late 1470s or early to mid-1480s (in the decade up through 1477)
- John Lydgate, The Temple of Glas, published anonymously, publication year uncertain; written about 1403
- Juraj Šižgorić, Elegiarum et carminum libri tres ("Book of elegies and poems"), first published book by a Croatian poet

1478:

- Anthony Woodville, Earl Rivers, The Morale Proverbes of Cristyne, translated from Proverbes Moreux by Christine de Pisan; published posthumously
- Angelo Polizano, Stanzas Begun for the Tournament of the Magnificent Giuliano de Medici, publication year uncertain, published sometime from 1475–1478 Italy
- Luigi Pulci, Morgante, a now lost 23-canto version (see also 1481, 1482 and the final, 28-canto Morgante Maggiore 1483); Italy

1479:

- Jami, Salaman u Absal ("Salaman and Absal"), allegory, Persian
- Anthony Woodville, Earl Rivers, Cordiale, or Four Last Things, translated from Jean Miélot's version of Cordiale quattour novissimorum, attributed to Gerardus de Vliederhoven and to Denis le Chartreux

== Births ==
Death years link to the corresponding "[year] in poetry" article:

1470:

- April 6 – Tang Yin (died 1523, according to some sources, or 1524 according to others), Chinese poet, painter and calligrapher
- May 20 – Pietro Bembo (died 1547), Italian cardinal, poet and writer, also a Latin-language poet
- Girolamo Angeriano, born sometime from about this year to about 1490 (died 1535), Italian, Latin-language poet; sources differ on his birth year, with some stating 1470, others giving "c. 1480" and another c. 1490
- Palladio Blosio born about this year (died 1550), Italian, Latin-language poet
- Andrea Fulvio (died 1527), Italian Renaissance humanist, poet and antiquarian
- Habibi, born about this year (died 1519?), Azerbaijani poet
- William Hendred (died 1520), English
- Severo Minervi born about this year (died 1529), Italian, Latin-language poet
- Garcia de Resende born about this year (died 1536), Portuguese
- Wen Zhengming (died 1559), Chinese poet, painter and calligrapher

1471:

- Adam Reusner born sometime from this year to 1496) (died sometime between 1563 and 1582), German
- Krishnadevaraya (died 1529), Emperor of the Vijayanagara Empire and influential patron of poetry
- Zâtî (died 1548), Turkish poet who taught and greatly influenced Bâkî

1472:

- Marcantonio Epicuro (died 1555), Italian, Latin-language poet

1473:

- Jean Lemaire de Belges, born about this year (died c. 1525), Walloon poet and historian living primarily in France
- Paolo Parrasio (died 1545), Italian, Latin-language poet
- Cecilia Gallerani (died 1536), Italian, Latin-language poet, a mistress of Ludovico Sforza
- Arakida Moritake 荒木田守武 (died 1549), Japanese, the son of Negi Morihide, and a Shinto priest; said to excel in waka, renga, and in particular haikai

1474:

- September 8 – Lodovico Ariosto (died 1533), Italian poet who also wrote verses in Latin
- Petrus Crinitus, also known as "Pietro Crinito" (died 1507), Florentine Italian humanist scholar and poet who wrote verses in Latin
- Gavin Douglas born about this year (died 1522), Scottish poet and bishop
- Stephen Hawes born about this year (died c. 1523), English poet and courtier

1475:

- Catherine d'Amboise (died 1550), French
- Michelangelo Buonarroti, commonly known as "Michelangelo", full name: Michelangelo Lodovico Buonarroti Simoni (died 1564), Italian painter, sculptor, architect, poet, and engineer
- Pietro Crinito, also known as "Petrus Crinitus", (died 1507), Florentine Italian humanist scholar and poet who also wrote Latin-language verses
- Pierre Gringore (died 1538), French poet and playwright
- Thomas Murner (died c. 1537), German satirist, poet and translator

1476:

- Alexander Barclay (died 1552), English/Scottish poet

1477:

- Baldassarre Castiglione, sources differ on whether he was born this year or 1478, (died 1529), Italian writer and poet who also wrote verses in Latin
- Malik Muhammad Jayasi (died 1542), Indian poet who wrote in the Avadhi dialect of Hindi
- Pietro Valeriano (died 1558), Italian, Latin-language poet

1478:

- Andrea Ammonio born about this year, one source says 1477 (died 1517), Italian, Latin-language poet
- Baldassarre Castiglione, sources differ on whether he was born this year or 1477 (died 1529), Italian writer and poet who also wrote verses in Latin
- Girolamo Fracastoro (died 1553), Italian physician, scholar, poet and atomist
- Gian Giorgio Trissino (died 1550), Italian Renaissance humanist, poet, dramatist, diplomat and grammarian
- Surdas, born either this year or in 1479, (died sometime from 1581 to 1584), Indian, Hindi poet and saint who wrote in the Brij Bhasha dialect

1479:

- June 14 – Giglio Gregorio Giraldi (died 1552), Italian scholar and poet
- Nicolò D'Arco (died 1546), Italian, Latin-language poet
- Celio Calcagnini (died 1541), Italian, Latin-language poet
- Zaccaria Ferreri (died 1524), Italian, Latin-language poet
- Surdas, born either in 1478 or this year (died sometime from 1581 to 1584), Indian, Hindi poet and saint who wrote in the Brij Bhasha dialect

== Deaths ==
Birth years link to the corresponding "[year] in poetry" article:

1471:

- Nōami (born 1397), Japanese painter and renga poet in the service of the Ashikaga shogunate
- Antonio Beccadelli (born 1394), Italian poet, canon lawyer, scholar, diplomat, and chronicler
- Sir Thomas Malory (born 1405), English writer, and author of Le Morte d'Arthur

1472:

- Leon Battista Alberti (born 1404), Italian author, artist, architect, poet, priest, linguist, philosopher, and cryptographer
- Liu Jue (born 1409), Chinese landscape painter, calligrapher, and poet
- Nezahualcoyotl (born 1402), Texcoco poet-king
- Janus Pannonius (born 1434), Hungarian poet especially of Humanist poetry

1474:

- Flavio Pantagato (birth year not known), Italian, Latin-language poet

1475:

- Georges Chastellain (born c. 1405 or c. 1415, French-language Burgundian chronicler and poet
- Masuccio Salernitano (born 1410), Italian

1477:

- Giannantonio Campano (born 1429), Italian, Latin-language poet

1478:

- Domizio Calderini (born 1446), Italian, Latin-language poet

1479:

- Jorge Manrique (born 1440), Spanish poet
- Raighu (born 1400), Apabhraṃśa poet

== See also ==
- Poetry
- 15th century in poetry
- 15th century in literature
