= 1480s in poetry =

Nationality words link to articles with information on the nation's poetry or literature (for instance, Irish or France).

== Events ==
- Robert Henryson's cycle The Morall Fabillis probably composed in the 1480s; earliest datable manuscripts of John Barbour's Scottish chivalric epic, Brus, also in this decade.

== Works published ==
1480:

1481:

- Luigi Pulci, Morgante, a 23-canto version (see also 1473, 1482 and the final Morgante Maggiore 1483); Italy

1482:

- Luigi Pulci, Morgante, a 23-canto version (see also 1473, 1481 and the final, 28-canto Morgante Maggiore 1483); Italy

1483:

- Geoffrey Chaucer, English, all posthumously published:
  - The House of Fame, edited by William Caxton, an unfinished dream-poem; Caxton wrote the 12-line conclusion
  - Troilus and Criseyde, published anonymously, publication year uncertain
- John Gower, Confessio Amantis, written about 1390
- Jami, Yusuf u Zulaikha ("Joseph and Zulaikha"), Persian
- John Lydgate, The Book of the Lyf of Our Lady, written at the request of Henry V of England; a very popular poem, with many manuscript copies extant in modern times; Great Britain
- Luigi Pulci, Morgante, sometimes also called Morgante Maggiore (the "Greater Morgante", the name give to the complete 28 canto edition) published in final form this year (see also the shorter versions published in 1473, 1481 and 1482); Italy

1484:

- Shin Maha Rahtathara, Bhuridat Lingagyi, Burma

1485:

1486:

1487:

- Alaoddoule Bakhtishah Samarqandi Daulatshah, Tazkerat Osh-sho-Ara ("The Record of Poets"), Persian literary history (scholarship)
- Blind Harry, The Actes and Deidis of the Illustre and Vallyeant Campioun Schir William Wallace, also known as The Wallace, long "romantic biographical" poem, probably created and published some time in the decade up to this year

1488:

- Sogi, Poem of One Hundred Links Composed by Three Poets at Minase, Japan

1489:

- François Villon, Le Grant Testament Villon et le petit. Son codicille. Le jargon & ses ballades, this was the first publication of various poems of the author, although some are incomplete; includes Poems 1–6 of his "Ballades en jargon"Paris: Pierre Levet (Poems 7–11 were first published in 1892), France

== Births ==
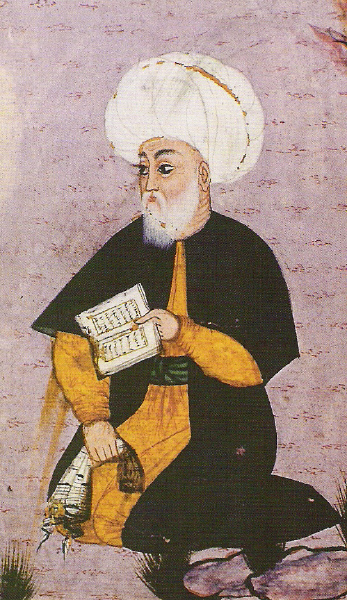
Fuzûlî (1483?–1556)

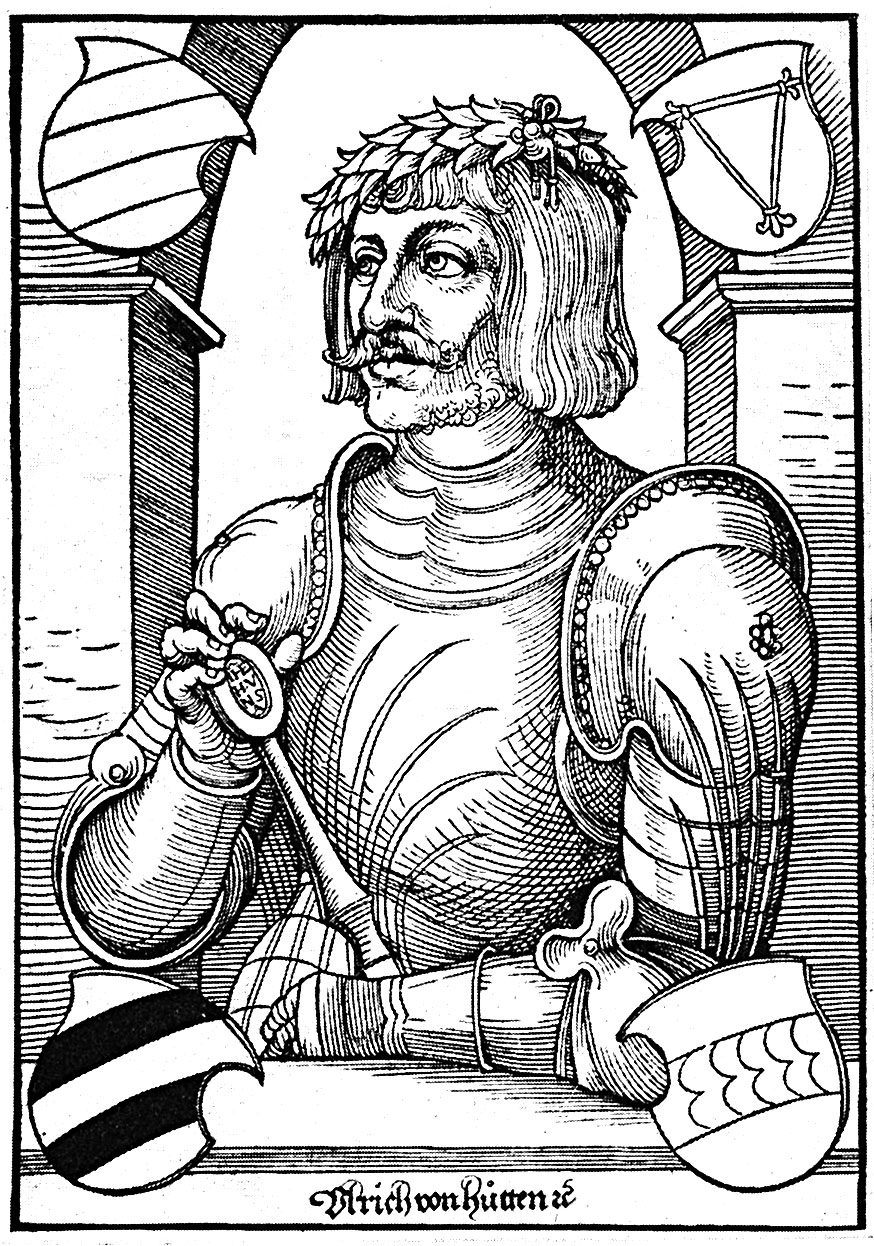
Ulrich von Hutten by Erhard Schön, c. 1522

Death years link to the corresponding "[year] in poetry" article:

1480:

- Pir Sultan Abdal (died 1550), Ottoman Empire
- Girolamo Angeriano, also known as "Hieronymus Angerianus" born sometime between about 1470 and about 1490 (died 1535), Italian, Latin-language poet; sources differ on his birth year, with some stating 1470, others giving "c. 1480" and another c. 1490
- Giovanni Cotta, born about this year (died 1510), Italian, Latin-language poet
- Giovanni Guidiccioni (died 1541), Italian
- Riccardo Sbruglio, born about this year (died 1480 – died after 1525), Italian, Latin-language poet

1481:

1482:

- Andrzej Krzycki (died 1532), Polish archbishop, Latin prose writer and Polish-language poet often considered one of Poland's greatest humanist writers
- Bernardim Ribeiro (died 1552), Portuguese
- Matthias Ringmann (died 1511), German cartographer and humanist poet
- Antonio Tilesio (died 1534), Italian, Latin-language poet
- Mavro Vetranović (died 1576), Croatian writer, poet and Benedictine friar

1483:

- November 10 – Martin Luther (died 1546), German Protestant leader and hymn-writer
- Benet Burgh (birth year unknown), English translator
- Fuzûlî (فضولی) (died c. 1556), Ottoman Empire
- Aurelio Casellio (died 1552), Italian, Latin-language poet
- Andrea Navagero (died 1483–1529), Italian, Latin-language poet

1484:

- Jón Arason (died 1550), Icelandic Roman Catholic bishop and poet
- Purandara Dasa (died 1564), Hindu composer of Carnatic music and Kannada poetry
- Niklaus Manuel (died 1530), Swiss, German-language poet
- Giulio Cesare Scaligero, (died 1558), Italian, Latin-language poet
- Paul Speratus (died 1581), German
- Huldrych Zwingli (died 1531), Swiss theologian, priest, poet, and writer

1485:

- November 30 – Veronica Gambara (died 1550), Italian poet, stateswoman and political leader born in Lombardy
- Hanibal Lucić (died 1553), Croatian poet and playwright
- Nikolaus Decius (died sometime after 1546), German
- Marco Girolamo Vida born about this year (died 1566), Italian, Latin-language poet

1486:

- Pedro Manuel Jiménez de Urrea, (died 1535), Spanish Renaissance poet and playwright

1487:

- Petar Hektorović (died 1572), Croatian writer, poet and collector

1488:

- January 6 – Helius Eobanus Hessus (died 1540), German, Latin poet
- Ulrich von Hutten (died 1523), German
- Michael Weiße (died 1534), German theologian and hymn writer
- Yang Shen (died 1559), Chinese poet

1489:

- Francesco Maria Molza (died 1544), Italian, Latin-language poet
- Thomas Müntzer (died 1525), German
- Rupa Goswami (died 1564), Hindu devotional teacher, poet, and philosopher

== Deaths ==
Birth years link to the corresponding "[year] in poetry" article:

1480:

- December 14 – Niccolò Perotti, also known as "Perotto" or "Nicolaus Perottus" (born 1430, according to some sources, or 1429, according to others, or either year, according to still others) Italian humanist, translator, author of one of the first modern Latin school grammars, and Latin-language poet
- Giovanni Mario Filelfo (born 1426), Italian, Latin-language poet
- Probable date – Ieuan ap Hywel Swrdwal (born 1430), Welsh poet writing in English, the first known to do so
- Approximate date – Raffaele Zovenzoni (born 1431), Italian, Latin-language poet

1481:

- Ikkyū (born 1394), eccentric, iconoclastic Japanese Zen Buddhist priest and poet
- Approximate date – Narsinh Mehta, alternate spelling: Narasingh Mehta (born c. 1414), Indian, Gujarati-language Hindu poet-saint notable as a bhakta, an exponent of Hindu devotional religious poetry; acclaimed as Adi Kavi (Sanskrit for "first among poets") of Gujarat, where he is especially revered

1482:

- (or 1502) – Bonino Mombrizio (born 1424), Italian, Latin-language poet

1483:

- Anthony Woodville (born c. 1422), English poet and translator
- Approximate date – Richard Holland, Scottish cleric and poet

1484:

- August 24 – Ippolita Maria Sforza (born 1446), Italian noblewoman and writer
- November 11 – Luigi Pulci (born 1432), Italian poet and diplomat
- Paolo Marsi (born 1440), Italian, Latin-language poet

1485:

- Lorenzo Lippi da Colle (born 1440), Italian, Latin-language poet (not to be confused with Lorenzo Lippi (1606–1664), Italian painter and poet)

1486:

- Ōta Dōkan (born 1432), Japanese samurai warrior-poet, military tactician and Buddhist monk; said to have been a skilled poet, but only fragments of his verse survive

1487:

1488:

- Andronico Callisto, died sometime after 1487, Italian, Latin-language poet

1489:

- Antonio Geraldini (born c. 1449–1489), Italian, Latin-language poet

== See also ==
- Poetry
- 15th century in poetry
- 15th century in literature
- List of years in poetry
- Grands Rhétoriqueurs
- French Renaissance literature
- Renaissance literature
- Spanish Renaissance literature

Other events:

- Other events of the 15th century
- Other events of the 16th century

16th century:

- 16th century in poetry
- 16th century in literature
