= 1430s in poetry =

Nationality words link to articles with information on the nation's poetry or literature (for instance, Irish or France).

== Events ==
- John Lydgate, writes The Fall of Princes, sometime from 1431–1438; later published posthumously in 1494, with extracts published separately as Proverbs in c. 1510

== Works published ==
1436:

- Santillana, Comedieta de Ponça, in Early Modern Spanish

1439:

- Asukai Masayo, compiler, Shinshokukokin Wakashū 新続古今和歌集 ("New Collection of Ancient and Modern Times Continued", a title which recollects the Shokukokin Wakashū) an imperial anthology of Japanese waka poetry, year of completion uncertain; compiled by the Emperor Go-Hanazono ordered it in 1433; consists of twenty volumes containing 2,144 poems; the last Imperial anthology of Japanese poems

== Births ==
Death years link to the corresponding "[year] in poetry" article:

1430:

- Antoine Busnois born about this year (died 1492), French composer and poet
- Eliseo Calenzio (died 1502), Italian, Latin-language poet
- Martino Filetico (died 1490), Italian, Latin-language poet
- Niccolò Perotti, also known as "Perotto" or "Nicolaus Perottus", born this year, according to some sources, or 1429, according to others, or either year, according to still others(died 1480), Italian humanist, author of one of the first modern Latin school grammars, and Latin-language poet
- Ieuan ap Hywel Swrdwal probable 1430 birth (died 1480), poet of the first known poem in the English language written by a Welshman

1431:

- Ubertino Pusculo (died c. 1469), Italian, Latin-language poet
- Raffaele Zovenzoni (died c. 1480), Italian, Latin-language poet
- François Villon born about this year (died sometime after January 5, 1463), French lyric poet, thief and vagabond

1432:

- August 15 – Luigi Pulci (died 1484), Italian
- Ōta Dōkan (died 1486), Japanese samurai warrior-poet, military tactician and Buddhist monk; said to have been a skilled poet, but only fragments of his verse survive

1434:

- Matteo Maria Boiardo (died c. 1494), Italian
- Antonio Bonfini (died 1503), Italian humanist and poet
- Janus Pannonius (died 1472), Hungarian poet especially of Humanist poetry

1435:

- Hans Folz born sometime from this year to 1440 (died 1513), German
- Jean Molinet (died 1507), French poet, chronicler, and composer

1436:

- Gabriele Altilio (died 1501), Italian, Latin-language poet
- Naldo Naldi (died c. 1513), Italian, Latin-language poet

1437:

- Callimaco Esperiente (died 1496), Italian, Latin-language poet

1438:

- Giovanni Michele Alberto Carrara (died 1490), Italian, Latin-language poet
- Ugolino Verino (died 1516), Italian, Latin-language poet

== Deaths ==
Birth years link to the corresponding "[year] in poetry" article:

1430:

- Alain Chartier (born 1392), French poet and political writer

1431:

- Felip de Malla (born 1370), Catalan prelate, theologian, scholastic, orator, classical scholar, and poet
- Andrea da Barberino (born 1370), Italian writer and poet

1434:

- Christine de Pizan, 1430, according to another source (born 1363), Italian poet who wrote courtly poetry in French

== See also ==
- Poetry
- 15th century in poetry
- 15th century in literature
