= 1360s in poetry =

Nationality words link to articles with information on the nation's poetry or literature (for instance, Irish or France).

== Events ==
1361:

- Guillaume de Machaut writes the Dit de la fontaine amoureuse

1365:

- November 30 – The Nagarakretagama, a Javanese eulogy chronicling the journey of the Majapahit king, Hayam Wuruk, through his kingdom, is completed by Mpu Prapanca
- Guillaume de Machaut completes Le voir dit

c.1367:

- Earliest likely date for the writing of Piers Plowman in Middle English, presumably by William Langland; it includes the earliest known reference to "rhymes of Robin Hood"

1368:

- September 12 – Death of English Plantaganet heiress Blanche of Lancaster (first wife of John of Gaunt) at Tutbury Castle aged (probably) 26 (perhaps of the Black Death), inspiring Geoffrey Chaucer's first major poem, The Book of the Duchess.
- Approx. date – Petrarch concludes writing the sequence of Italian sonnets and other poems known as Il Canzoniere

== Births ==
Death years link to the corresponding "[year] in poetry" article. There are conflicting or unreliable sources for the birth years of many people born in this period; where sources conflict, the poet is listed again and the conflict is noted:

1360:

- Jean Petit (died 1411), French theologian, poet and professor

1364:

- September – Christine de Pizan (died c.1430), Venetian-born poet writing courtly poetry in Middle French

1368:

- Thomas Hoccleve (died 1426), English poet

1369:

- Approximate date – Imadaddin Nasimi (executed 1418/19), Turkic Ḥurūfī and mystical poet writing in Azerbaijani, Persian and Arabic

== Deaths ==
Birth years link to the corresponding "[year] in poetry" article:

1361:

- Philippe de Vitry (born 1291), French composer, music theorist and poet

1365:

- Zhu Derun (born 1294), Chinese painter and poet in Yuan Dynasty

1367:

- Jakushitsu Genkō (born 1290), Japanese Rinzai master, poet, flute player, and first abbot of Eigen-ji

== See also ==
- Poetry
- 14th century in poetry
- 14th century in literature
- List of years in poetry
- Grands Rhétoriqueurs
- French Renaissance literature
- Renaissance literature
- Spanish Renaissance literature

Other events:

- Other events of the 14th century
- Other events of the 15th century

15th century:

- 15th century in poetry
- 15th century in literature
