= 1340s in poetry =

Nationality words link to articles with information on the nation's poetry or literature (for instance, Irish or France).

== Events ==
1341:

- Petrarch becomes Poet Laureate in Rome.

== Works published ==
1340:

- Raimon de Cornet and Peire de Ladils compose a partimen

1343:

- Glorios Dieus, don totz bens ha creysensa, an anonymous planh for Robert of Naples

1345:

- Petrarch, De Vita Solitaria, Italy

1346:

- The Vows of the Heron written in Flemish (approximate date)

1348:

- Peire Lunel de Montech writes Meravilhar no·s devo pas las gens on the occasion of the Black Death

1349:

- Welsh poet Ieuan Gethin writes about the Black Death

c. 1340–1349:

- Welsh poet Dafydd ap Gwilym writes The Girls of Llanbadarn and The Seagull

== Births ==
Death years link to the corresponding "[year] in poetry" article. There are conflicting or unreliable sources for the birth years of many people born in this period; where sources conflict, the poet is listed again and the conflict is noted:

1343:

- Geoffrey Chaucer (died 1400), English author, poet, philosopher, bureaucrat, courtier and diplomat

1348:

- Jan of Jenštejn (died 1400), Archbishop of Prague who was a poet, writer and composer.

== Deaths ==
Birth years link to the corresponding "[year] in poetry" article:

1342:

- Eifuku-mon In (born 1271), Japanese poet of the Kamakura period and member of the Kyōgoku school of verse
- U Tak (born 1262), Korean poet

1343:

- Ke Jiusi (born 1290), Chinese landscape painter, calligrapher and poet during the Yuan dynasty

1345:

- Manuel Philes (born 1275), Byzantine poet
- Qiao Ji (born unknown), Chinese dramatist and poet during the Yuan dynasty

1346

- Abu Es Haq es Saheli (born 1290), Andalusī-born Arabic poet and architect in the Mali Empire

1347:

- Kokan Shiren (born 1278), Japanese Rinzai Zen patriarch and celebrated poet in Chinese

1348:

- Jacopo Alighieri (born 1289), Italian poet, son of Dante Alighieri
- Sesson Yūbai (born 1290), Japanese Rinzai priest and poet

1349:

- Ibn al-Yayyab (born 1274) Arabic, statesman and poet from the Nasrid kingdom of Granada
- Hamdollah Mostowfi (born 1281), Persian historian, geographer and epic poet

== See also ==
- Poetry
- 14th century in poetry
- 14th century in literature
- List of years in poetry
- Grands Rhétoriqueurs
- French Renaissance literature
- Renaissance literature
- Spanish Renaissance literature

Other events:

- Other events of the 14th century
- Other events of the 15th century

15th century:

- 15th century in poetry
- 15th century in literature
