= 15th century in poetry =

== Events ==
- 1445 - Printing press developed in Europe.

== Works ==
- Moses da Rieti, Miqdash me'at, Hebrew poet writing in Italy
- Per Raff Lille, Mariaviser ("Songs to Mary"), Denmark
- Stora rimkronikan ("The Great Rhymed Chronicle"), Sweden
- 1402–1403 – Christine de Pisan, Le Livre du chemin de long estude, describing a trial of the faults of this world in the "Court of Reason"
- 1403 – Christine de Pisan, La Mutacion de Fortune ("The Changes of Fortune")
- c.1434 – John Lydgate, The Life of St. Edmund, King and Martyr
- c.1470–1485 – Pietru Caxaro, Il Cantilena, oldest known Maltese text
- c.1480s – Robert Henryson, cycle The Morall Fabillis of Esope the Phrygian in Scotland
- 1473–1480 – Maladhar Basu, ''Sri Krishna Vijaya (শ্রীকৃষ্ণবিজয়, "Triumph of Lord Krishna"), Bengal

== Births and deaths ==
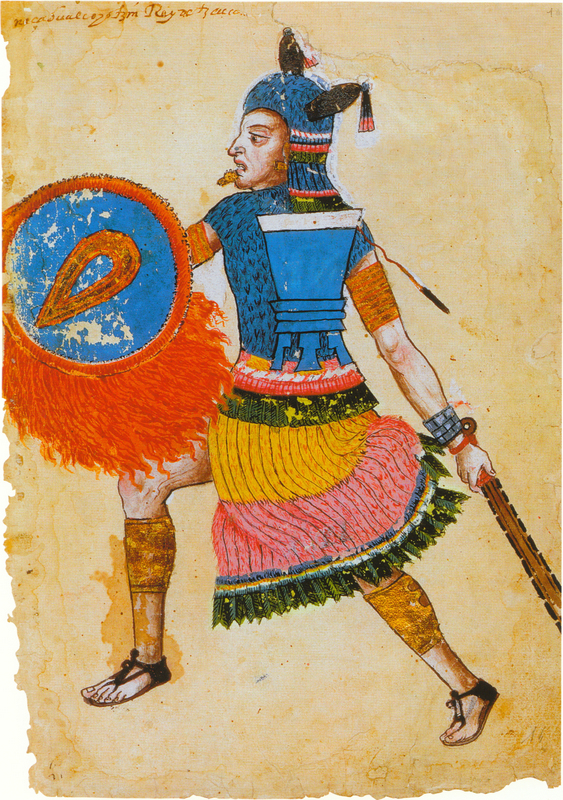
Nezahualcoyotl as depicted in the 16th century Codex Ixtlilxochitl.

=== Mexico ===
- Axayacatl (1449-1481), huey tlatoani (supreme leader or emperor) of Tenochtitlan and poet
- Ayocuan Cuetzpaltzin (mid 15th-early 16th centuries) wise man, poet, white eagle from Tecamachalco
- Cacamatzin (1483-1520), tlatoani of Texcoco and poet
- Chichicuepon (15th century) poet from Chalco (altépetl)
- Cuacuauhtzin (1410-1443), tlatoani (ruler) of Tepechpan wrote a poem about his betrayal by Nezahualcoyotl.
- Macuilxochitzin (c. 1435-?), daughter of Tlacaelel
- Nezahualcoyotl (tlatoani) (1402-1472), ruler of Texcoco (altepetl), poet, and architect
- Tecayehuatzin of Huexotzinco (second half of 15th to early 16th century), poet and philosopher (Huexotzinco was a semi-independent state, alternately loyal to the Aztec Empire or to Tlaxcala.)
- Temilotzin (end of 15th century-1525), born in Tlatelolco (altepetl) and Tlatoani of Tzilacatlan
- Tochihuitzin coyolchiuhqui, (late 14th-mid 15th centuries) Tlatoani and poet from Teotlatzinco, son of Itzcoatl
- Xicotencatl I (1425-1522) tlatoani of Tizatlan (Tlaxcala)

=== Europe ===
- Per Raff Lille (c. 1450 — c. 1500), Danish
- Tomas af Strangnas, (died 1443), Swedish
- François Villon (1431–1463), French
- Janus Pannonius (1431–1472), Latin from Hungary

=== Japan ===
- Arakida Moritake 荒木田守武 (1473–1549), the son of Negi Morihide, and a Shinto priest; said to have excelled in waka, renga, and in particular haikai
- Ikkyū 休宗純, Ikkyū Sōjun 1394–1481), eccentric, iconic, Rinzai Zen Buddhist priest, poet and sometime mendicant flute player who influenced Japanese art and literature with an infusion of Zen attitudes and ideals; one of the creators of the formal Japanese tea ceremony; well-known to Japanese children through various stories and the subject of a popular Japanese children's television program; made a character in anime fiction
- Shōtetsu 正徹 (1381–1459), considered by some the last great poet in the courtly waka tradition; his disciples were important in the development of renga, which led to haiku
- Sōgi 宗祇 (1421–1502), Japanese Zen monk who studied waka and renga poetry, then became a professional renga poet in his 30s
- Yamazaki Sōkan 山崎宗鑑, pen name of Shina Norishige (1465–1553), renga and haikai poet, court calligrapher for Shōgun Ashikaga Yoshihisa; became a secluded Buddhist monk following the shōgun's death in 1489

=== Persian language ===
- Jami, poet (1414–1492)
- Mir Ali Shir Nava'i, poet (1441–1501)

=== South Asia ===
- Bhalan (c. 1426–1500), Indian, Gujarati-language poet
- Chandidas (চন্ডীদাস) (born 1408 CE) refers to (possibly more than one) medieval Indian Bengali-language poet
- Meerabai (मीराबाई) (1498-1547), alternate spelling: Meera, Mira, Meera Bai; Hindu poet-saint, mystical poet whose compositions, extant version of which are in Gujarati and a Rajasthani dialect of Hindi, remain popular throughout India
- Nund Reshi (1377–1440), Indian, Kashmiri-language poet
- Zainuddin (fl. 1470s), Bengali-language poet

== See also ==
- 15th century in literature
- Macronic poetry

== Decades and years ==
1390s	1390	1391	1392	1393	1394	1395	1396	1397	1398	1399
1400s	1400	1401	1402	1403	1404	1405	1406	1407	1408	1409
1410s	1410	1411	1412	1413	1414	1415	1416	1417	1418	1419
1420s	1420	1421	1422	1423	1424	1425	1426	1427	1428	1429
1430s	1430	1431	1432	1433	1434	1435	1436	1437	1438	1439
1440s	1440	1441	1442	1443	1444	1445	1446	1447	1448	1449
1450s	1450	1451	1452	1453	1454	1455	1456	1457	1458	1459
1460s	1460	1461	1462	1463	1464	1465	1466	1467	1468	1469
1470s	1470	1471	1472	1473	1474	1475	1476	1477	1478	1479
1480s	1480	1481	1482	1483	1484	1485	1486	1487	1488	1489
1490s	1490	1491	1492	1493	1494	1495	1496	1497	1498	1499
1500s	1500	1501	1502	1503	1504	1505	1506	1507	1508	1509
