= 1350s in poetry =

This article covers 1350s in poetry. Nationality words link to articles with information on the nation's poetry or literature (for instance, Irish or France).

== New works ==
c. 1350:

- Baudouin de Sebourc (French, probably from Hainaut)
- The Tale of Gamelyn (Middle English)

c. 1352:

- Wynnere and Wastoure (Middle English)

1355

- Guillaume de Deguileville – Le Pèlerinage de l'Âme

== Births ==
Death years link to the corresponding "[year] in poetry" article. There are conflicting or unreliable sources for the birth years of many people born in this period; where sources conflict, the poet is listed again and the conflict is noted:

1350:

- Andrew of Wyntoun, also known as Andrew Wyntoun (died 1423), Scottish poet, a canon and prior

1352:

- Vemana born around 1352 (approx.) (died unknown), Telugu poet
- Vidyapati, also known as Vidyapati Thakur and called Maithil Kavi Kokil "the poet cuckoo of Maithili", (born 1448), Indian, Maithili-language poet and Sanskrit writer

1355:

- Anselm Turmeda, also known as "Abd-Allah at-Tarjuman" عبد الله الترجمان (died 1423), a poet who wrote in both Catalan Spanish and, after converting to Islam, in Arabic

1357:

- Hugo von Montfort (died 1423), Austrian minstrel and representative of the German Minnesang (songwriters and poets)

== Deaths ==
Birth years link to the corresponding "[year] in poetry" article:

1350:

- Janabai (born unknown), Marāthi religious poet in the Hindu tradition in India
- Juan Ruiz (born 1283), known as the Archpriest of Hita (Arcipreste de Hita), was a medieval Spanish poet
- Jyotirishwar Thakur (born 1290), Sanskrit poet and an early Maithili writer

1351:

- Musō Soseki (born 1275), Rinzai Zen Buddhist monk and teacher, and a calligraphist, poet and garden designer

1352:

- Khwaju Kermani (born 1280), Persian Sufi
- Shiwu (born 1272), Chinese Chan poet and hermit

1356:

- Nasiruddin Chiragh Dehlavi (born 1274), mystic-poet and a Sufi Saint of Chishti Order
- Zheng Yunduan (born 1327), Chinese poet in the Yuan Dynasty

== See also ==
- Poetry
- 14th century in poetry
- 14th century in literature
- List of years in poetry
- Grands Rhétoriqueurs
- French Renaissance literature
- Renaissance literature
- Spanish Renaissance literature

Other events:

- Other events of the 14th century
- Other events of the 15th century

15th century:

- 15th century in poetry
- 15th century in literature
