= 1330s in poetry =

Nationality words link to articles with information on the nation's poetry or literature (for instance, Irish or France).

== Works published ==
1330–32:

- Guillaume de Deguileville produces the first redaction of Le Pèlerinage de la vie humaine

1332:

- Raimon de Cornet, in a song, urges Philip VI of France to tax those who do not join his projected Crusade and urges those who do not to pray twice or thrice daily for those who do

1336:

- Raimon de Cornet publishes a canso attacking Philip VI of France for failing to fulfill his crusading vow of 1332

== Births ==
Death years link to the corresponding "[year] in poetry" article. There are conflicting or unreliable sources for the birth years of many people born in this period; where sources conflict, the poet is listed again and the conflict is noted: 1332:

- William Langland (died 1400), conjectured author of the 14th-century English dream-vision Piers Plowman

1334:

- Jaume March II (died 1410), Catalan language poet

1335:

- Franco Sacchetti (died 1400), Italian poet and novelist

1336:

- Gao Qi (died 1374), Chinese poet of the Ming dynasty

1337:

- Jean Froissart (died 1405), French chronicler and poet

== Deaths ==
Birth years link to the corresponding "[year] in poetry" article:

1336:

- Cino da Pistoia (born 1270), Italian (approx.)

1338:

- Robert Mannyng (born 1275), Middle English, French and Latin writer in England
- Awhadi of Maragheh (born 1271), Persian

== See also ==
- Poetry
- 14th century in poetry
- 14th century in literature
- List of years in poetry
- Grands Rhétoriqueurs
- French Renaissance literature
- Renaissance literature
- Spanish Renaissance literature

Other events:

- Other events of the 14th century
- Other events of the 15th century

15th century:

- 15th century in poetry
- 15th century in literature
