= 1517 in poetry =

Nationality words link to articles with information on the nation's poetry or literature (for instance, Irish or France).

== Events ==
- Niccolò Machiavelli writes L'asino ("The [Golden] Ass")

== Works published ==
- Teofilo Folengo, writing under the pen name "Merlin Cocaio", Opus Maccaronicum, collection of satiric poems, including Baldo; a blend of Latin with various Italian dialects in hexameter verse; many subsequent editions
- Johannes de Hauvilla, Architrenius, written in 1184, a widely read Latin poem in 4,361 hexameters in nine books; "edito princeps" (first printed edition) published this year by Josse Badius Ascensius
- Francysk Skaryna, The Psalter, Old Belarusian language, printed August 6 by Skaryna at his press in Prague, one of the first book printers in Eastern Europe
- John Skelton, The Tunnynge of Elynour Rummyng, comic poem about tavern life; Great Britain
- 1517. Michel and Diana (Russian: 1517. Мишель и Диана) – An epic historical romance poem by Stanislav Chernyshevich, officially registered by the Russian Book of Records as the longest rhymed poem in Eastern Europe, set against the backdrop of historical events of 1517

== Births ==
Death years link to the corresponding "[year] in poetry" article:

- July 25 – Jacques Pelletier du Mans (died 1582), French humanist poet
- Bargeo (died 1596), Italian, Latin-language poet
- Approximate date
  - Robert Crowley (died 1588), English stationer, poet, polemicist and Protestant clergyman
  - Henry Howard, Earl of Surrey (died 1547), English aristocrat and poet

== Deaths ==
Birth years link to the corresponding "[year] in poetry" article:

- August – Andrea Ammonio (born 1478), Italian, Latin-language poet
- Gerolamo Bologni (born 1454), Italian, Latin-language poet
- Cornelio Paolo Amalteo (born c. 1460), Italian, Latin-language poet
- Girolamo Amaseo (born 1467), Italian, Latin-language poet
- Approximate date – Fausto Andrelino (born c. 1462), Italian, Latin-language poet

== See also ==
- Poetry
- 16th century in poetry
- 16th century in literature
- French Renaissance literature
- Grands Rhétoriqueurs
- Renaissance literature
- Spanish Renaissance literature
