= 1320s in poetry =

Nationality words link to articles with information on the nation's poetry or literature (for instance, Irish or France).

== Events ==
1324:

- May 3 (Holy Cross Day): The Consistori del Gay Saber, founded the previous year in Toulouse to revive and perpetuate the lyric poetry of the Old Occitan troubadors, holds its first contest. Arnaut Vidal de Castelnou d'Ari wins the violeta d'or (golden violet) for a sirventes in praise of the Virgin Mary. At about this date, Raimon de Cornet writes in support of the aims of the Gay Saber.

1327:

- April 6 (Good Friday): Tuscan writer Petrarch sees a woman he names Laura in the church of Sainte-Claire d'Avignon, which awakes in him a lasting passion. He writes a series of sonnets and other poems in Italian dedicated to her, which are collected into Il Canzoniere, an influential model for Renaissance culture.

== Works created ==
1310

- Amir Khusrow writes Khazain-ul-Futuh

1315–16

- Amir Khusrow writes the masnavi Duval Rani–Khizr Khan ("Romance of Duval Rani and Khizr Khan")

1316–18

- Amir Khusrow writes the masnavi Noh-Sepehr ("Nine Skies")

1321:

- Approximate first publication of the Divine Comedy
- Erikskrönikan ("Eric's Chronicle"), 1320–1321, Sweden

1324:

- Raimon de Cornet writes Aras quan vey de bos homes fraytura, a planh for Amanieu VII of Albret, and his treatise Doctrinal de trobar

1326:

- Peire Lunel de Montech writes his Ensenhmane del garso and his Crusading song Mal veg trop apparelhar

1327:

- The deposed King Edward II of England perhaps writes the "Lament of Edward II"

== Births ==
Death years link to the corresponding "[year] in poetry" article. There are conflicting or unreliable sources for the birth years of many people born in this period; where sources conflict, the poet is listed again and the conflict is noted:

1320:

- John Barbour (died 1395), Scottish poet and the first major literary voice to write in Scots language
- Dafydd ap Gwilym (died c.1350), Welsh poet
- Lalleshwari (died 1392), Kashmiri poet and mystic
- Peter Suchenwirt (died 1395), Austrian poet and herald

1325:

- Gidō Shūshin (died 1388), Japanese luminary of the Zen Rinzai sect, a master of poetry and prose in Chinese

1327:

- Zheng Yunduan (died 1356), Chinese poet in the Yuan dynasty

== Deaths ==
Birth years link to the corresponding "[year] in poetry" article:

1321:

- September 13/September 14: Dante Alighieri (born 1265), Italian poet of the Middle Ages, author of Divine Comedy
- date unknown: Yunus Emre (born 1240), Turkish poet and Sufi mystic

1325:

- January 7: King Denis of Portugal (born 1261), Galician–Portuguese troubadour and patron
- October: Amir Khusrow (born 1253), Sufi, writing in Persian and Hindustani

1326:

- Shekh Bhano (born 1256), Bangladesh who wrote the poetical work Ashararul Eshk

1327:

- Cecco d'Ascoli (born 1257), Italian encyclopaedist, physician and poet
- James II of Aragon (born 1267), a Catalan troubadour

1328:

- Immanuel the Roman (born 1261), Italian-Jewish scholar and satirical poet

1329:

- Albertino Mussato (born 1261), Early Renaissance Italian statesman, poet, historian and dramatist

== See also ==
- Poetry
- 14th century in poetry
- 14th century in literature
- List of years in poetry
- Grands Rhétoriqueurs
- French Renaissance literature
- Renaissance literature
- Spanish Renaissance literature

Other events:

- Other events of the 14th century
- Other events of the 15th century

15th century:

- 15th century in poetry
- 15th century in literature
