= 1450s in poetry =

Nationality words link to articles with information on the nation's poetry or literature (for instance, Irish or France).

== Events ==
1450:

- Fairfax Manuscript thought to have been completed, for John Stanley of Hooton, Cheshire ("Anno 1450" inscribed on folio 1r).

1451:

- August 1 – A manuscript of Dante's Divine Comedy is sold in London

1452:

- Niccolò Perotti made Poet Laureate in Bologna by Frederick III, Holy Roman Emperor

== Works published ==
1450:

- Santillana, Bias contra Fortuna, published about this year; Spain
- Vetteve, Guttilaya, narrative poem by a Sinhalese monk

1454:

- Padmanabhan, Kanhadade Prabandha, Indian, Rajasthani-language

1456:

- François Villon, Le Petit Testament

== Births ==
Death years link to the corresponding "[year] in poetry" article:

1450:

- August 18 – Marko Marulić (died 1524), Croatian poet, philosopher and Christian humanist, known as "the Crown of the Croatian Medieval Age" and the "father of the Croatian Renaissance"; He signed his works as "Marko Marulić Splićanin" ("Marko Marulić of Split"), "Marko Pečenić", "Marcus Marulus Spalatensis", or "Dalmata"
- Hieronymus Balbus, also called "Girolamo Balbi" and "Accellini", born about this year (died c. 1530), Italian, Renaissance humanist, Latin-language poet, diplomat, and bishop Latin-language poet
- Henry Bradshaw (died 1513), English
- Benedetto Cariteo (died 1514), Italian
- Gian Giacomo della Croce born about this year (died sometime after 1502), Italian, Latin-language poet
- Lodovico Lazzarelli (died 1500), Italian, Latin-language poet
- Per Raff Lille born about this year (died c. 1500), Denmark
- Jean Marot born about this year (born c. 1526), French poet and father of poet Clément Marot
- Faustino Perisauli born about this year (died 1523), Italian, Latin-language poet
- Pothana (died 1510), Telugu poet best known for his translation of the Bhagavata Purana from Sanskrit to Telugu
- Panfilo Sasso born about this year (died 1527), Italian, Latin-language poet
- Cornelio Vitelli born about this year (died c. 1525), Italian, Latin-language poet

1452

- Francesco Negri (humanist) (died 1524 or sometime later), Italian, Latin-language poet

1453:

- Ermolao Barbaro, sources differ on his death year, with some simply stating 1493 and others stating 1493 year and 1495 are each possible (1493),(born 1453), Italian, Latin-language poet
- Filippo Beroaldo (died 1505), Italian, Latin-language poet
- Michele Marullo, also known as "Michael Marullus" (died 1500, or about that year), Italian, Latin-language poet

1454:

- Gerolamo Bologni (died 1517), Italian, Latin-language poet
- Nicodemo Folengo born sometime from this year to 1456, Italian, Latin-language poet
- Angelo Poliziano, also known as "Politan" and "Angelo Ambrogini" (died 1494), Italian, Latin-language poet and humanist

1455:

- Probo de Marianis (died 1499), Italian, Latin-language poet
- Giovanni Armonio Marso, born about this year (death year not known), Italian, Latin-language poet
- Johannes Reuchlin (died 1522), German

1456:

- Giovanni Aurelio Augurelli (died 1524), Italian, Latin-language poet
- Nicodemo Folengo born sometime from 1454 to this year, Italian, Latin-language poet

1457:

- Sebastian Brant born this year or in 1458 (died 1521), German
- Šiško Menčetić (died 1527), Croatian poet and Ragusan nobleman
- Jacopo Sannazaro, also known as "Iacopo Sannazaro" (died 1530), Italian poet, humanist and epigrammist who also wrote in Neapolitan and Latin

1458:

- Pietro Bonomo, also known as "Petrus" (died 1546), Italian, humanist, diplomat, bishop of Trieste and Latin-language poet
- Sebastian Brant born this year or in 1457 (died 1521), German
- Giorgio Anselmo, born this year or sometime earlier (died 1528), Italian, Latin-language poet; grandson of another Giogrio Anselmo, an Italian mathematician and astronomer (died 1440)
- Jacopo Sannazaro (died 1530), Italian poet, humanist and epigrammist who also wrote in Neapolitan and Latin

1459:

- February 1 – Conrad Celtis (died 1508), German and Latin-language poet

== Deaths ==
Birth years link to the corresponding "[year] in poetry" article:

1450:

- Olivier Basselin (born 1400), French poet
- Badr Shirvani (born 1387), Persian poet

1451:

- John Lydgate (born 1370), English monk and poet
- Michault Taillevent died about this year (born c. 1395), French

1456:

- Gilbert Hay, or perhaps "Sir Gilbert the Hay", who may have been a different person; last mentioned this year (born c. 1403), Scottish poet and translator
- Juan de Mena (born 1411), Spanish poet appointed veinticuatro (one of twenty-four aldermen) of Córdoba, secretario de cartas latinas (secretary of Latin letters) and cronista real (royal chronicler)

1457:

- Basinio da Parma (born 1425–1457), Italian, Latin-language poet

1458:

- Inigo Lopez de Mendoza (born 1398), Spanish

1459:

- March 3 – Ausiàs March (born 1397), Spanish, Catalan poet
- Shōtetsu (born 1381), Japanese Waka poet during the medieval period

== See also ==
- Poetry
- 15th century in poetry
- 15th century in literature
