= 1500 in poetry =

Nationality words link to articles with information on the nation's poetry or literature (for instance, Irish or French).

== Works published ==
=== English ===
- Anonymous, publication year conjectural, A Gest of Robin Hood
- Anonymous, publication year conjectural, Guy of Warwick, related to the Anglo-Norman Gui de Warewic (c. 1232–1242)
- Anonymous, Sir Bevis of Hampton, translated c. 1300 from the Anglo-Norman Boeve de Haumtone c. 1200
- Anonymous, Sir Eglamour of Artois, written in the mid-14th century
- Geoffrey Chaucer, published anonymously, publication year conjectural, Mars and Venus, an amalgamation of the author's The Complaint of Mars and The Complaint of Venus
- John Lydgate, published anonymously, publication year conjectural, The Virtue of the Mass, also called the Interpretacio Misse

=== Other ===
- Stora rimkronikan ("The Great Rhymed Chronicle"), published about this year, Sweden
- Erasmus, De Laudibus Britanniae, a Latin ode in which the author calls John Skelton, appointed tutor to Prince Henry of England, "unum Britannicarum literarum lumen ac decus", and congratulates the prince for having so fine a teacher.
- Pierre Gringore, le Château d’Amours, France
- Singiraja, Maha Basavaraja Charitra, India

== Births ==
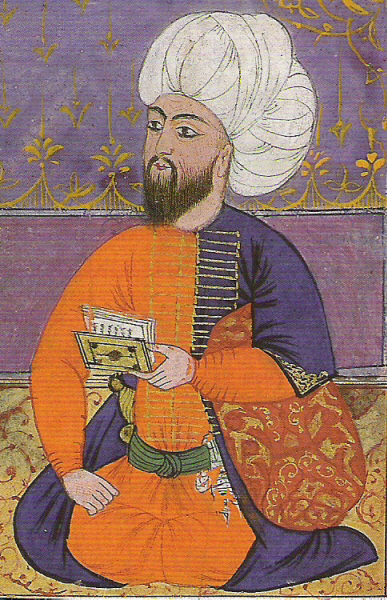
Hayâlî (1500?–1557), Ottoman poet

Death years link to the corresponding "[year] in poetry" article:

- December 6 - Nicolaus Mameranus (died c. 1567), Luxembourgian soldier and Latin-language historian and poet
- Erasmus Alberus, birth year uncertain (died 1553), German humanist, reformer and poet
- Shlomo Halevi Alkabetz (died 1580), Greek kabbalist and poet
- Antonius Arena, also known as "Antoine Arènes" (died 1544), French jurist and poet
- Eustorg Beaulieu (died 1552), French
- John Bellenden (died about 1548), English
- Bonaventure des Périers, born about this year (suicide 1544), French author and poet
- George Cavendish, born this year according to one source but another states 1494 (died about 1561), English
- Hayâlî (خيالى) (died 1557), Ottoman Turkish
- Nikolaus Herman, birth year uncertain (died 1561), German hymnodist
- Marcello Palingenio Stellato, born this year or 1503 (died 1543), Italian, Latin-language poet
- Ludovico Pasquali (died 1551), Italian author and poet
- Christoff Wirsung, birth year uncertain (died 1571), German
- Wu Cheng'en born 1500 or 1505 (died c. 1580), Chinese novelist and poet of the Ming Dynasty

== Deaths ==
Birth years link to the corresponding "[year] in poetry" article:

- June 23 - Lodovico Lazzarelli (born 1450), Italian, Latin-language poet, philosopher, courtier and magician
- Bhalam (born c. 1426), Indian, Gujarati-language poet
- Serafino Ciminelli, also known as "Serafino Aquilano" (born 1466), Italian poet, singer, author and actor
- Robert Henryson, last known to be active about this year (flourished from c. 1460), Scottish makar poet
- Michele Marullo (born 1453), Italian, Latin-language poet
- Per Raff Lille, died about this year (born c. 1450), Danish poet
- Giovanni Mattia Tabarino (born c. 1420), Italian, Latin-language poet

== See also ==
- Poetry
- Other events of the 15th century
- Other events of the 16th century
- 15th century in poetry
- 16th century in poetry
- Grands Rhétoriqueurs
- List of years in poetry
- 16th century in literature
- French Renaissance literature
- Renaissance literature
- Spanish Renaissance literature
