= 1440s in poetry =

Nationality words link to articles with information on the nation's poetry or literature (for instance, Irish or France).

== Events ==
- 1442 – Enea Piccolomini, the future Pope Pius II, arrives at the court of Frederick III, Holy Roman Emperor, in Vienna, who names him imperial poet.
- 1445 – Printing press developed in Europe

== Works published ==
1445:

- Cancionero de Baena, the first collection of Castilian lyrics, Spain

1449:

- Amoryus and Cleopes, poem by John Metham, English adaptation of the Pyramus and Thisbe narrative from Ovid‘s Metamorphoses

== Births ==
Death years link to the corresponding "[year] in poetry" article:

1440:

- Lorenzo de' Medici, born January 1 (died 1492), Italian banker, politician, patron of the arts and poet who wrote in his native Tuscan language
- Martial d'Auvergne (died 1500), French
- Hans Folz born sometime from 1435 to this year (died 1513), German
- Blind Harry, also known as "Henry the Minstrel", born about this year (died 1492), Scottish makar (poet)
- Kabir (died 1518), mystic poet and saint of India
- Lorenzo Lippi (of Cole) (died 1485), Italian, Latin-language poet
- Jorge Manrique (died 1479), Spanish poet
- Paolo Marsi (died 1484), Italian, Latin-language poet
- Molla, also known as "Mollamamba", both popular names of Atukuri Molla (died 1530), Indian poet who wrote Telugu Ramayan; a woman
- Ludovico Pontico born about this year (died 1520), Italian, Latin-language poet
- Giorgio Sisgoreo born about this year (died c. 1510), Italian, Latin-language poet
- Francesco Uberti (humanist) (died 1518), Italian, Latin-language poet

1441:

- Mir Ali Shir Nava'i (died 1501), Persian or Turkish poet and scholar

1442:

- Amerigo Corsini (died 1501), Italian, Latin-language poet
- Pietro Antonio Piatti born about this year (died after 1508), Italian, Latin-language poet

1443:

- Matteo Canale (died 1503), Italian, Latin-language poet

1444:

- Pandolfo Collenuccio (died 1504), Italian, Latin-language poet

1445:

- Cantalicio (died 1515), Italian, Latin-language poet
- Bartolomeo Fonzio born about this year (died 1513), Italian, Latin-language poet

1446:

- Domizio Calderini (died 1478), Italian, Latin-language poet
- Ippolita Maria Sforza (died 1484), Italian noblewoman and writer
- Robert Wydow (died 1505), English poet, church musician, and religious figure

1447:

- Baptista Mantuanus, also known as "Battista Mantovano" and "Johannes Baptista Spagnolo" (died 1516), Italian Carmelite reformer, humanist and Latin-language poet

1448:

- Johannes von Soest (died 1506), German composer, theorist and poet

1449:

- Quinto Emiliano Cimbriaco born about this year (died 1499), Italian, Latin-language poet
- Antonio Geraldini born about this year (died 1489), Italian, Latin-language poet
- Aldo Manuzio (died 1515), Italian, Latin-language poet

== Deaths ==
Birth years link to the corresponding "[year] in poetry" article:

1440:

- Cuacuauhtzin (born 1410), Aztec lord and poet in the Pre-Columbian nahua world
- Nund Reshi (born 1377), Indian, Kashmiri-language poet

1442:

- Nguyễn Trãi (born 1388), Vietnamese Confucian scholar, poet, politician and tactician

1443:

- Tomas af Strangnas, Swedish

1444:

- Andreu Febrer died about this year (born c. 1375), Catalan Spanish translator of the Divine Comedy

1448:

- Vidyapati, also known as Vidyapati Thakur and called Maithil Kavi Kokil "the poet cuckoo of Maithili", died about this year (born c. 1352), Indian, Maithili-language poet and Sanskrit writer

== See also ==
- Poetry
- 15th century in poetry
- 15th century in literature
