= 1390s in poetry =

This article covers 1390s in poetry. Nationality words link to articles with information on the nation's poetry or literature (for instance, Irish or France).

== Events ==
- 25 November – Eustache Deschamps completes his treatise on verse, L’Art de dictier et de fere chansons, balades, virelais et rondeaulx.
- Gruffudd Llwyd active in Wales.

== Births ==
Death years link to the corresponding "[year] in poetry" article. There are conflicting or unreliable sources for the birth years of many people born in this period; where sources conflict, the poet is listed again and the conflict is noted:

1392:

- Alain Chartier (died 1430), French poet and political writer

1394:

- Antonio Beccadelli (died 1471), Italian poet, canon lawyer, scholar, diplomat, and chronicler
- Charles, Duke of Orléans (died 1465), French
- Ikkyū (died 1481), eccentric, iconoclastic Japanese Zen Buddhist priest and poet

1395:

- Michault Taillevent (died 1451), French

1397:

- Ausiàs March (died 1459), Valencian poet
- Nōami (died 1471), Japanese painter and renga poet in the service of the Ashikaga shogunate

1398:

- Kabir, some dispute with his years of birth and death (died 1518), mystic composer and saint of India, whose literature has greatly influenced the Bhakti movement of India
- Inigo Lopez de Mendoza (died 1458), Spanish

== Deaths ==
Birth years link to the corresponding "[year] in poetry" article:

1390:

- Hafez (born 1315), Persian lyric poet

1392

- Lalleshwari (born 1320), Kashmiri poet and mystic

1395:

- 13 March – John Barbour (born c. 1320), Scottish poet and the first major literary voice to write in Scots language
- Peter Suchenwirt (born 1320), Austrian poet and herald

== See also ==
- Poetry
- 14th century in poetry
- 14th century in literature
- List of years in poetry
- Grands Rhétoriqueurs
- French Renaissance literature
- Renaissance literature
- Spanish Renaissance literature

Other events:

- Other events of the 14th century
- Other events of the 15th century

15th century:

- 15th century in poetry
- 15th century in literature
