= 1508 in poetry =

This article covers 1508 in poetry. Nationality words link to articles with information on the nation's poetry or literature (for instance, Irish or France).

== Works published ==
=== Scotland ===
- Anonymous, Golagros and Gawain, a Middle Scots romance written in the late 15th century in alliterative metre; based on two episodes from the First Continuation of Chrétien de Troyes' Perceval, ou le Conte du Graal
- Andrew Cadiou, Porteous of Nobleness, a Scots version of Alain Chartier's Le Breviaire des Nobles
- William Dunbar:
  - The Flyting of Dunbar and Kennedy, and Other Poems, a fragmentary text of The Flyting, to which is added two short poems, "Wythin a garth", attributed to Henryson, and "Devise, prowes and eke humilitee", by an anonymous author
  - The Golden Targe
- Henry the Minstrel, also known as Blind Harry, The Actes and Deidis of the Illustre and Vallyeant Campioun Schir William Wallace, publication year uncertain; written c. 1478 in Scots verse, supposedly derived from a Latin original; one of the most popular works of Scottish poetry of this era
- Robert Henryson, Orpheus and Eurydice, published anonymously, publication year uncertain
- Richard Holland, Buke of the Howlat, publication year uncertain; written c. 1450, in the poem an assembly of birds hears the Owl bitterly complaining against Dame Nature for making him ugly
- John Lydgate, The Complaint of the Black Knight

=== Other ===
- William Hendred, The Pylgrymage of Man, London, Great Britain
- Jean Lemaire de Belges, La Concorde du genre humain, Walloon poet published in France

== Births ==
Death years link to the corresponding "[year] in poetry" article:

- April 3 – Jean Daurat also spelled "Jean Dorat"; Latin name: "Auratus" (died 1588), French poet and scholar, member of La Pléiade
- Marin Držić, also known as "Marino Darza" and "Marino Darsa" (died 1567), Croatian dramatist, author and poet

== Deaths ==
Birth years link to the corresponding "[year] in poetry" article:

- February 4 – Conrad Celtes (born 1459), German and Latin-language poet
- May 13 – Martial d'Auvergne (born 1420), French poet
- Pietro Antonio Piatti (born 1442), Italian, Latin-language poet

== See also ==
- Poetry
- 16th century in poetry
- 16th century in literature
- French Renaissance literature
- Grands Rhétoriqueurs
- Renaissance literature
- Spanish Renaissance literature
