= 1410s in poetry =

Nationality words link to articles with information on the nation's poetry or literature (for instance, Irish or France).

== Events ==
- c. 1411–13 – Thomas Hoccleve writes Regement of Princes or De Regimine Principum for Henry, Prince of Wales.

== Works published ==
- 1413 – The Pilgrimage of the Soul

== Births ==
Death years link to the corresponding "[year] in poetry" article:

1410:

- Martin le Franc (died 1461), French poet of the late Middle Ages and early Renaissance
- Masuccio Salernitano (died 1475), Italian poet
- Cuacuauhtzin (died 1440), Aztec lord and poet in the Pre-Columbian nahua world
- Dafydd Gorlech (died 1490), Welsh language poet

1411:

- Juan de Mena (died 1456), Spanish poet appointed veinticuatro (one of twenty-four aldermen) of Córdoba, secretario de cartas latinas (secretary of Latin letters) and cronista real (royal chronicler)

1412:

- (c.1412–1420) Guto'r Glyn (died c.1493), Welsh language poet
- Gómez Manrique (died 1490), Spanish poet, soldier, politician and dramatist

1413:

- Saint Catherine of Bologna (died 1463), Italian saint, abbess, visionary, calligrapher, miniaturist and poet

1414:

- Jami (died 1492), Persian scholar, mystic, writer, composer of numerous lyrics and idylls, historian, and Sufi poet
- Narsinh Mehta, alternate spelling: Narasingh Mehta, born about this year (died 1481), Indian, Gujarati-language Hindu poet-saint notable as a bhakta, an exponent of Hindu devotional religious poetry; acclaimed as Adi Kavi (Sanskrit for "first among poets") of Gujarat, where he is especially revered

== Deaths ==
Birth years link to the corresponding "[year] in poetry" article:

1410:

- Jaume March II (born 1334), Catalan language poet

1411:

- Jean Petit (born 1360), French theologian, poet and professor

1418:

- Laurent de Premierfait (born 1380), Latin poet, humanist and translator

1418/19:

- Imadaddin Nasimi (born 1369/70), Turkic Ḥurūfī and mystical poet writing in Azerbaijani, Persian and Arabic, executed

== See also ==
- Poetry
- 15th century in poetry
- 15th century in literature
