= 1507 in poetry =

This article covers 1507 in poetry. Nationality words link to articles with information on the nation's poetry or literature (for instance, Irish or France).

== Works published ==
- William Dunbar, The Tua Maritt Wemen and the Wedo, publication year uncertain; also contains the author's "Lament for the Makaris", "Kynd Kittok", and "The Testament of Mr. Andro. Kennedy"; Great Britain
- The Jousts of May and June, anonymously published, publication year uncertain; Great Britain
- Jean Lemaire de Belges, Les Chansons de Namur, written in support of a popular revolt; Belgian Waloon poet writing in French
- Guntherus Ligurinis, Ligurinus sive de gestis Frederici I libri X, a description of the battles Frederick Barbarossa fought with Milan whom the poet calls "Ligures", written by a 12th-century poet, found in a monastery by C. Celtis, who gave it to K. Peutinger, published by Chunrades Peutinger; republished in 1531 by J. Spiegel in Strasbourg, and in 1561 by Otto von Freising in Basel, Switzerland
- Baptista Mantuanus, an Italian, Latin-language poet:
  - Parthenese, one of seven poems the author wrote with the same name, this one on St. Caecilia; Milan
  - Mantuan Georgius, a poem on St. George, Milan
  - Obiurgatio cum exortatione ad capienda arma contra infideles ad Potentatos Christianos, Milan
- Jean Marot, Le Voyage de Gênes

== Births ==
Death years link to the corresponding "[year] in poetry" article:

- June 6 – Annibale Caro (died 1566), Italian
- October 7 – Guillaume Guéroult born about this year (died 1569), French editor, translator and poet
- Also:
  - Chang Chi-Hsiang (died 1587), Chinese poetry anthologist
  - Girolamo Amalteo of Oderzo (died in 1574), Italian poet who wrote in Latin

== Deaths ==
Birth years link to the corresponding "[year] in poetry" article:

- August 23 – Jean Molinet (born 1435), French poet, chronicler, and composer
- Petrus Crinitus, also known as "Pietro Crinito" (born 1474), Florentine Italian humanist scholar and poet who wrote verses in Latin

== See also ==
- Poetry
- 16th century in poetry
- 16th century in literature
- French Renaissance literature
- Grands Rhétoriqueurs
- Renaissance literature
- Spanish Renaissance literature
