= 1275 in poetry =

== Works published ==
- L'autr' ier al gai tems de Pascor, a pastorela by Joan Esteve

== Births ==
- Dnyaneshwar (died 1296), Maharashtran saint, poet, philosopher and yogi
- Manuel Philes (died 1345), Byzantine
- Robert Mannyng (died 1338), English monk, writing in Middle English, French and Latin
- Musō Soseki (died 1351), Rinzai Zen Buddhist monk and teacher, and a calligraphist, poet and garden designer

== Deaths ==
- Fujiwara no Tameie (born 1198), Japanese poet
- John of Howden, English canon and poet writing in Norman French and Latin
