= 1261 in poetry =

This article covers 1261 in poetry.

== Births ==
- October 9 – Denis of Portugal (died 1325), king, Galician–Portuguese troubadour and patron
- Immanuel the Roman (died 1328), Italian-Jewish scholar and satirical poet
- Albertino Mussato (died 1329), Early Renaissance Italian statesman, poet, historian and dramatist
