= 1298 in poetry =

This article covers 1298 in poetry.

== Deaths ==
- Abdelaziz al-Malzuzi (born unknown), Moroccan poet of the Marinid period
