= 1240 in poetry =

== Events ==
- Peire Bremon Ricas Novas and Sordello attack each other in a string of sirventes

== Births ==
- Tran Thanh Tong (died 1290), Vietnamese poet and ruler
- Yunus Emre (died 1321), Turkish poet and Sufi mystic
