= 1213 in poetry =

== Events ==
- Raimon de Miravalh, an Occitan troubadour, flees to Spain after the Battle of Muret, vowing not to sing until he has recaptured his castle, his last authentic poem Bel m'es being written this year.

== Births ==
- Fakhruddin Iraqi (died 1289), Persian Sufi writer

== Deaths ==
- 28 November – Huguet de Mataplana (born 1173), troubadour, dies of wounds received in the Battle of Muret
- Gace Brulé (born 1160), French trouvère
- Afdal al-Din Kashani (born unknown), Persian poet and philosopher

== See also ==
- Poetry
- List of years in poetry
