= 1370s in poetry =

Nationality words link to articles with information on the nation's poetry or literature (for instance, Irish or France).

== Events ==
1374:

- April 23 – English writer Geoffrey Chaucer is granted a gallon of wine a day for the rest of his life by order of King Edward III of England in recognition of his services.

== Works published ==
1375:

- Barbour composes The Brus under the probable commission of Robert II in Scotland. The poem is an innovative blend of vernacular romance and chronicle genres.

== Births ==
Death years link to the corresponding "[year] in poetry" article. There are conflicting or unreliable sources for the birth years of many people born in this period; where sources conflict, the poet is listed again and the conflict is noted:

1370:

- Andrea da Barberino (died 1431), Italian writer and poet
- John Lydgate (died 1451), English monk and poet
- Felip de Malla (died 1431), Catalan prelate, theologian, scholastic, orator, classical scholar, and poet

1375:

- Andreu Febrer (died 1444), Catalan Spanish translator of the Divine Comedy

1377:

- Nund Reshi (died 1440), Indian, Kashmiri-language poet

== Deaths ==
Birth years link to the corresponding "[year] in poetry" article:

1370:

- Vedanta Desika (born 1269), poet, devotee, philosopher and master-teacher

1372:

- Seán Mór Ó Dubhagáin, Irish poet

1374:

- Gao Qi (born 1336), Chinese poet of the Ming dynasty
- Petrarch (born 1304), Italian scholar, poet and one of the earliest Renaissance humanists

1375:

- Chūgan Engetsu (born 1300), Japanese poet, occupies a prominent place in Japanese Literature of the Five Mountains

1377:

- Guillaume de Machaut (born c. 1300) French poet and composer, perhaps the most influential composer of the Middle Ages

== See also ==
- Poetry
- 14th century in poetry
- 14th century in literature
- List of years in poetry
- Grands Rhétoriqueurs
- French Renaissance literature
- Renaissance literature
- Spanish Renaissance literature

Other events:

- Other events of the 14th century
- Other events of the 15th century

15th century:

- 15th century in poetry
- 15th century in literature
