= Jean Bouchet =

Bouchet at work on Les Regnars traversant, from the only known illuminated manuscript of the text

Jean Bouchet (30 January 1476 – c. 1558) was a French lawyer, poet, historian, polemicist and moralist. He was the longest-lived of the grand rhétoriqueurs of the early French Renaissance. He was an early critic of Martin Luther.

== Life ==
Bouchet was born in Poitiers on 30 January 1476. His father, Pierre Bouchet, was a procurator who died in 1480. Jean attended the Collège de Puygarreau attached to the University of Poitiers, probably attaining a Bachelor of Arts degree. He was tonsured, probably in his youth, certainly by 1532.

In Lyon in April 1496, seeking royal patronage, Bouchet presented some poems to Charles VIII, but the king directed him to Florimond Robertet instead. He was working in Paris as a law clerk as early as 1497, where he joined the Basoche (law clerks' guild). He was still working in Paris in 1503, but he was working as a procurator in Poitiers by 1507.

Bouchet's most important patron was also one of his most important clients, Louis de La Trémoille. He also represented the church of Saint-Pierre de Chauvigny and had strong connections with Chauvigny. His wife, Françoise Bonnyot, belonged to a wealthy family of Chauvigny. He purchased a house in Chauvigny and it was there that his family stayed during outbreaks of the plague. Bouchet probably married Françoise shortly after his return to Poitiers in 1507. She brought him a sizable dowry.

Bouchet was a member of the city council, the Mois et Cent. In 1522, he was part of a delegation sent by the city to Francis I. In 1537, he was part of a commission looking into new bylaws. He directed the performance of several mystery plays, but he refused to take on such responsibility outside of Poitiers. He was still working for the church at Chauvigny in 1554 and still writing as late as 1557. He was dead by 1559.

Bouchet and Françoise had at least eight children. The eldest son, Gabriel, also became a procurator and was working the Chauvigny file by 1537. A son named Joseph was a writer like his father. They had three daughters who married and one who became a nun.

== Works ==
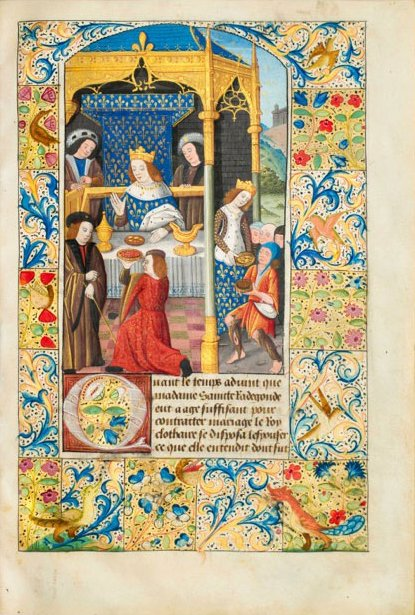
Page from a manuscript of Bouchet's translation of Fortunatus' Vita Radegundis

Bouchet wrote the following works, listed alphabetically with the date of publication in parentheses except where noted:

- L'Amoureux transy sans espoir (1503–1504)
- Les anciennes et modernes genealogies des Roys de France (1528, new edition 1545)
- Les Angoysses et remedes d'amour (1537)
- Les Annales d'Acquitaine (1524, reprinted 1557)
- Cantiques et oraisons contemplatives de l'ame penitente (MS c. 1524)
- Le Chappellet des princes (1517)
- La Deploration de l'eglise militante (1512)
- Epistre de la royne Marie (1517)
- Epistre envoyée des Champs Elisées au roy Henry d'Engleterre (written 1512)
- Epistres, elegies, epigrammes et epitaphes (1535)
- Epistres morales et familieres de Traverseur (1545)
- Forme et ordre de plaidoirie (1542)
- L'Histoire de Clotaire (1518)
- Le Jugement poetic de l'honneur femenin (1538)
- Le Labirynth de Fortune (1522)
- Opusculles du Traverseur (1525)
- Le Panegyric de Chevallier sans reproche (1527)
- Les Regnars traversant les perilleuses voyes des folles fiances du monde (1503–1504)
- Le Temple de Bonne Renommée (1517)
- Les Triumphes de la noble et amoureuse dame (1530)
- Triomphes du tres Chrestien ... roy de France, François premier de ce nom (1549)

Les Regnars traversant—better known under the modernized title Les Renards traversants—is Bouchet's first printed work. From it he took the nickname he often used to sign his later works: "le Traverseur des voies perilleuses". The first edition published by Antoine Vérard contained a false attribution to Sebastian Brant and numerous textual changes by the publisher, for which Bouchet successfully sued him. Vérard also published a "deluxe pseudo-manuscript" with the woodcut illustrations replaced by hand drawings. A singular illuminated manuscript of the text, not based on the printed version, was produced for Philip the Handsome.

Some of the earlier writings of Bouchet to appear in print are poems. The poetry collection L'Amoureux transy sans espoir was printed no later than 1507, but some of its poems are at least a decade older. It is named for its love poems, but it also contains a poem in support of Charles VIII's invasion of Italy in 1494–1495 (which may have been presented to the king in 1496) and an epitaph of Charles VIII.

Bouchet's first published work of history, L'Histoire et cronicque de Clotaire, premier de son nom ... et de sa tresillustre espouse madame saincte Radegonde (or L'Histoire de Clotaire for short), appeared in 1518 (dated 1517 OS). Blending hagiography and critical historiography, it is a biography of Saint Radegund framed by a history of the reign of her husband, King Chlothar I. It is divided into four parts based on the four stages of Radegund's life: girl, queen, nun and saint in heaven. As a result of his critical approach to the sources, he concluded, contrary to then current hagiography of Radegund, that she was not a virgin but had normal sexual relations with her husband. His interest in Radegund went back to 1496, when Charles VIII commissioned him to translate the Latin Vita Radegundis of Venantius Fortunatus. This survives in an illuminated presentation manuscript made for Charles VIII before 1498.

Bouchet's only published work devoted to his legal profession is Forme et ordre de plaidoirie. He revised it after the Ordinance of Villers-Cotterêts of 1539 and it was printed in small format in 1542. It is a practical manual for procurators.

== Bibliography ==
- Britnell, Jennifer (1986). Jean Bouchet. Edinburgh University Press.
- Campbell, Gordon, ed. (2003). "Bouchet, Jean". The Oxford Dictionary of the Renaissance. Oxford University Press.
- Hamon, Auguste (1901). Un Grand Rhétoriqueur poitevin: Jean Bouchet, 1476–1557?. H. Oudin, Éditeur.
- Heath, Michael (2005) [1995]. "Bouchet, Jean". In Peter France (ed.). The New Oxford Companion to Literature in French. Oxford University Press.
- Hindman, Sandra (2001). "Les Regnars traversant les perilleuses voyes des folles fiances du monde by Jean Bouchet". In James R. Tanis; Jennifer A. Thompson (eds.). Leaves of Gold: Manuscript Illumination from Philadelphia Collections. Philadelphia Museum of Art. pp. 215–217.
- Wüstefeld, Wilhelmina C. M.; Nettekoven, Ina (2018). Celebrating the Past: Sixty Medieval Manuscripts (PDF). Dr. Jörn Günther Rare Books AG.
