= 1289 in poetry =

== Events ==
- Joan Esteve wrote Planhen ploran ab desplazer, a planh for Guilhem de Lodeva, the French admiral

== Births ==
- Jacopo Alighieri (died 1348), Italian poet, the son of Dante Alighieri

== Deaths ==
- Fakhruddin Iraqi (born 1213), Persian Sufi writer
