= Gruffudd Llwyd =

Welsh poet (active c. 1380–1410)

Gruffudd Llwyd (fl. c. 1380–1410) was a Welsh-language poet.

Gruffudd was the nephew of the poet Hywel ab Einion Lygliw and the bardic tutor of Rhys Goch Eryri.

Gruffudd composed poems on themes of love and religion. His surviving work is characterised by the anti-English sentiment leading up to the rebellion led by Owain Glyndŵr.
