= Abdelaziz al-Malzuzi =

Abu Faris Abdelaziz ibn Abdarrahman al-Malzuzi al-Miknasi (Arabic: عبد العزيز الملزوزي) (born in Meknes, died 1298) is considered to be the greatest poet of the Marinid period. He is also well known as a historian. There is little known about his life, besides that he was the court poet of Abu Yahya ibn Abd al-Haqq. Among his many poetical works is a long didactic poem about the history of prophets. According to Ibn al-Khatib (the biographer of Ibn Abd al-Haqq) Al-Malzuzi mixed his Arabic with Zenata elements. He was from the Berber Malzuza tribe of Tripolitania. He died incarcerated, in 1297-1298.
