= 1271 in poetry =

This article covers 1271 in poetry.

== Births ==
- Eifuku-mon In (died 1342), Japanese poet of the Kamakura period and member of the Kyōgoku school of verse
- Awhadi of Maragheh (died 1338), Persian
