= 1290 in poetry =

== Works ==
- Heinrich Frauenlob writes Frauenleich and Alle Freude verlässt mich

== Births ==
- Abu Es Haq es Saheli (died 1346), Andalusī-born Arabic poet and architect
- Jyotirishwar Thakur (died 1350), Sanskrit poet and early Maithili writer
- Jakushitsu Genkō (died 1367), Japanese Rinzai master, poet, flute player and first abbot of Eigen-ji
- Ke Jiusi (died 1343), Chinese landscape painter, calligrapher and poet during the Yuan dynasty
- Sesson Yūbai (died 1348), Japanese Rinzai priest and poet

== Deaths ==
- Guido delle Colonne (born 1215) Sicilian writer, in Latin
- Shem-Tov ibn Falaquera (born 1225), Hebrew poet in Al-Andalus
- Tran Thanh Tong (born 1240), Vietnamese poet and ruler
