= 1299 in poetry =

This article covers 1299 in poetry.

== Events ==
- Yishan Yining is sent on a diplomatic mission to Japan to restore relations with the Bakufu government
