= Tochihuitzin coyolchiuhqui =

Tochihuitzin
- Born: End of 14th Century
- Died: Middle of 15th Century

Tochihuitzin, son of Itzcoatl, was ruler of Teotlatzinco. Tochihuitzin and his brothers helped save Nezahualcoyotl from being captured by the Azcapotzalca that Nezahualcoyotl found refuge with the Mexica. According to Cronica Mexicayotl, Tochihuitzin married Achihuapoltzin, daughter of Tlacaelel. After the battle against the city of Azcapotzalco, Tochihuitzin became ruler of Teotlatzinco.

== Poetry ==
He would be remembered as a poet. His poems mostly focused on the meaning of life.

Poems attributed to Tochihuitzin include:

- Zan Tontemiquico (We Come Only To Dream)
- Cuicatl Anyolque (You Have Lived The Song)
