= Bodleian Library, MS Fairfax 16 =

Middle English poetic anthology

Oxford, Bodleian Library, MS Fairfax 16, also known as the Fairfax Manuscript, is a fifteenth-century Middle English poetic anthology which contains one of the finest collections of Chaucerian verse of this period. Owned and commissioned by John Stanley (died 1469?) of Hooton, Cheshire, Fairfax 16 was produced in Oxford or London in the mid-fifteenth century. Thomas Fairfax bequeathed it to the Bodleian Library in 1671.

== Contents ==
Fairfax 16 contains 55 courtly love poems, totalling 343 leaves in 44 quires, all largely concerned with fin amors and morality. The texts are predominantly courtly in nature and subject, and reflect the social and literary refinements of the 'lettered chivalry' of the time. The manuscript includes works by Geoffrey Chaucer, Thomas Hoccleve, John Lydgate, Sir John Clanvowe, and Charles of Orleans.

=== Reson and Sensuallyte ===
Fairfax 16 is notable for the dream vision poem Reson and Sensuallyte it contains. The poem only survives in two sources: Fairfax 16, and a later sixteenth-century manuscript London, British Library, Additional MS 29272, which was copied from Fairfax 16 by the antiquarian John Stowe. The Fairfax-Reson is thus the oldest surviving copy of the text. It is, frustratingly, incomplete in Fairfax 16, and no ending to the text survives. Reson has historically been attributed to John Lydgate by John Stowe; however the poem's authorship has been contested.

=== Letter of Cupid ===
The manuscript is also notable for the copy of Thomas Hoccleve's Letter of Cupid it contains. As is the case with many manuscripts of this poem, the text in Fairfax 16 is disarranged and the stanzas are out of order. Research by Cynthia A. Rogers has revealed that this disarrangement was caused by the shuffling of pages in the exemplar. However, the text of Hoccleve's Letter in Fairfax 16 is uniquely disarranged, because after the scribe copied the (already disarranged) Letter from the same exemplar, the quires were accidentally misbound and the pages shuffled to create a second layer of disarrangement. Frederick J. Furnivall described this unique arrangement of the poem as 'shuffled like a pack of cards'.

=== The "Fairfax Sequence" ===
A term coined by Derek Pearsall to refer to a collection of twenty anonymous ballades and complaints in Fairfax 16. The Fairfax Sequence discuss the principal themes of service, injustice, and governance, all modelled on the style of conventional courtly lyrics. Notably, the titles of these poems recurringly mention 'the lovere' in the contemporary table of contents (fol. 2v), which suggests these poems were regarded as a sequence. The relationship of these poems to the rest of the manuscript is unclear, as they are contained in the last booklet which, unlike the rest of the manuscript, does not contain catchwords. It is therefore uncertain if it was part of the scriptorium's production or if it was supplied separately. The authorship of these poems is also unclear, although they are thought to have been written by one person. The figure of William de la Pole, Duke of Suffolk (1396–1450) has been suggested from his connection with Charles d'Orléans and John Stanley, but this is unconfirmed. Regardless, the "Fairfax Sequence" are of fundamental importance in charting the emergence of English lyric collections from the late-medieval period.

=== How a Lover Praiseth his Lady ===
Fairfax 16 contains the only extant copy of How a Lover Praiseth his Lady, a unique Middle-English love lyric that incorporates encyclopaedic-style lists into poetry. The female subject's beauty is described in a feature-by-feature catalogue of over 200 lines which moves methodically from top to toe. The poem is also unusual for its astrological, mathematical, physiological, anatomical, and medical references, which Martina Braekman describes as a technique where 'conventional topoi are extended into non-courtly areas in an attempt to revitalize the genre while still satisfying the audience's fashionable taste for courtly love poetry'.

== Decoration ==
The manuscript contains one full-page illustration executed on a singleton leaf of parchment which was added later (folio 14v). When John Stanley purchased the manuscript, he commissioned the services of an artist, now known as the Abingdon Missal Master, to create this illustration that faces the first text: Chaucer's Complaint of Mars. (Norton-Smith distinguishes the Abingdon Missal Master from William Abell, as he judges there is insufficient evidence to suggest both are the same individual.) The scene depicts Mars, Venus, and Jupiter in three vignettes, surrounded by three knights, the three Graces, Vulcan, and a dog. The border around the illustration incorporates the Stanley of Hooton coat of arms. The quartered arms relates to the Hooton family of Cheshire, identifying Stanley who belonged to a branch whose seat was a Hooton. Norton-Smith describes the arms as "quarterly, argent first and forth on a bend azure three stags' heads or, argent second and third on a bend azure three mullets or; crest: a tilting helmet, on a mount azure a holly tree vert with berries gules". The same arms appear in London, British Library, MS Harley 6163, fol. 22r.

== Provenance and History ==
=== The Oxford Group ===
In 1908, Eleanor Prescott Hammond published a study of Bodleian Library, MSS Fairfax 16, Tanner 346, and Bodley 638 which demonstrated that these manuscripts descend from the same, now lost, archetype. Aage Brusendorff re-examined the manuscripts and confirmed that these manuscripts descend from a common source, but argues that they likely shared multiple booklet-exemplars, which were exchanged and copied in tandem between scribes.

According to John Norton-Smith, this makes Fairfax 16 a nearly perfectly preserved example of a manuscript produced to order by a commercial scriptorium for a single owner. The manuscript is made up of 5 booklets, which in turn were copied from booklets acquired by the scribes. These booklets were then assembled to form the present manuscript.

=== Ownership ===
The manuscript was likely written in the 1440s, and is thought to have been completed in 1450 from the inscription "Anno 1450" on folio 1r.

The manuscript's first owner was John Stanley, Esq. (1400-?1469), the son of Sir William Stanley of Hooton in the Wirral. After Stanley's death, it is presumed the manuscript remained in the family for a short while. A signature on folio 321v suggests it may have passed into the possession of Sir Thomas Moyle (d.1560).

Charles Fairfax (1597–1673) acquired the manuscript in 1650, as his inscription on folio 1r states: "I bought this att Gloucester | 8 Sept. 1650 C. Fairfax | intendinge to exchange it for a better booke | Note þ^{t} Joseph Holland hath an other of these manuscript". It was inherited by Thomas Fairfax (1612–1671), who bequeathed the manuscript to the Bodleian Library on his death.

=== Conservation ===
From 2014 to 2016, the manuscript was conserved and entirely rebound by Arthur Green and Sabina Pugh at the Bodleian conservation workshop. The manuscript has been fully digitised by the Bodleian Library.
