= 1400s in poetry =

This article covers 1400s in poetry. Nationality words link to articles with information on the nation's poetry or literature (for instance, Irish or France).

== Events ==
1400:

- Sir Gawain and the Green Knight completed (started around 1350)
- Geoffrey Chaucer, The Canterbury Tales, left incomplete with the author's death this year

1402:

- Pere de Queralt appointed ambassador to Tunis

== Births ==
Death years link to the corresponding "[year] in poetry" article:

1400:

- Olivier Basselin (died 1450), French poet
- Raighu (died 1479), Apabhraṃśa poet

1402:

- Nezahualcoyotl (died 1472), philosopher, poet and ruler (tlatoani) of the city-state of Texcoco in pre-Columbian Mexico

1403:

- Gilbert Hay, or perhaps "Sir Gilbert the Hay", who may have been a different person; last mentioned this year (died 1455), Scottish poet and translator

1404:

- Leon Battista Alberti (born 1472), Italian author, artist, architect, poet, priest, linguist, philosopher, and cryptographer

1405:

- Sir Thomas Malory (died 1471), English writer, and author of Le Morte d'Arthur
- Georges Chastellain born 1405 or 1415 (died 1475), Burgundians chronicler and poet

1408:

- Annamacharya (died 1503), mystic saint composer of the 15th century, widely regarded as the Telugu "pada kavita pitaamaha" (grand old man of simple poetry); husband of Tallapaka Tirumalamma
- Chandidas (died unknown), refers to (possibly more than one) medieval poet of Bengal

1409:

- Liu Jue (died 1472), Chinese landscape painter, calligrapher, and poet

== Deaths ==
Birth years link to the corresponding "[year] in poetry" article:

1400:

- Geoffrey Chaucer (born 1343), English author, poet, philosopher, bureaucrat, courtier and diplomat
- Jan of Jenštejn (born 1348), Archbishop of Prague who was a poet, writer and composer
- Kamal Khujandi (born unknown), Persian Sufi and Persian ghazal poet
- William Langland (born 1332), conjectured author of the 14th-century English dream-vision Piers Plowman
- Franco Sacchetti (born 1335), Italian poet and novelist

1405:

- Gilabert de Próixita (born unknown), Valencian poet with twenty-one extant Occitan pieces
- Jean Froissart (born 1337), French chronicler and poet

== See also ==
- Poetry
- 15th century in poetry
- 15th century in literature
