= Yusuf Meddah =

Early 14th-century Azerbaijani poet

- Occupation: Poet
- Writing career
- Language: Azerbaijani, possibly Persian
- Period: 14th century
- Notable work: Varqa va Gülşāh

Yusuf Meddah (Azerbaijani: Yusif Məddah, یوسف مداح) was an early 14th-century Azerbaijani poet. He is considered one of the earliest known authors of Azerbaijani literature, and his poetry played a significant role in the development of the Azerbaijani literary language. Although little is known about his life, it is estimated that he lived at the beginning of the 14th century. Meddah was well-educated and fluent in Azerbaijani, Arabic, and Persian.

Meddah's most famous work is Varqa va Gülşāh, which consists of approximately 1,700 couplets written in aruz form, a type of poetry using quantifying prosody, and is based on an Arabic folk tale. Other notable works by Meddah include Ghazavātnāmah, Dāstān-i Iblīs 'Aleyh al-La'nah, Qiṣṣah-i Yūsuf, and possibly Maqtal-i Hüseyn and Khāmūshnāmah if they are indeed his works.

== Life ==
Not much is known about the life of Yusuf Meddah. He used the pen name "Yusuf Meddah" most commonly in his work, although he also went by other names such as "Yusufi" and "Yusuf-i Meddah". The earliest reference to the poet comes from the Turkish poet Mustafa Sheykhoghlu's work, Kenz al-Küberá, written in 1401. In this work, he recites a couplet from Varqa va Gülşāh and mentions "Yusuf-i Meddah". His birth date and place are unknown, but he is believed to have lived in the early 14th century. The scholar Shahin Mustafayev suggests that Meddah was a native of Eastern Anatolia. His works suggest that he was well-educated, fluent in Azerbaijani, Arabic, and Persian, and knowledgeable in religious studies. He spent his early years in Azerbaijan before relocating to Konya and joining the Mevlevi Order, a Sufi order that originated in the city. As can be inferred from the title Meddah, a name given to a traditional Turkic storyteller, he travelled from city to city, reciting poetry to the public. He lived in various regions, including Erzincan, Ankara, Sivas, and Kastamonu, and was well known in these places. It is believed that he lived a long life, but his death date and place are unknown.

== Poetry ==
Meddah had a strong command of the Azerbaijani language. He was familiar with the divan (collection of short poems) literature of his time and enriched his poems with verses, hadiths, proverbs, and idioms. Meddah was knowledgeable in aruz prosody and incorporated folk sayings and expressions in his works, which also included literary arts.

The most famous work by the poet is Varqa va Gülşāh (lit. 'Varqa and Gülşāh'), (Note: The title of the work is also spelled in various sources as Varaqa and Gulshah or Varaka ve Gülşah,) which consists of approximately 1,700 couplets written in aruz form. The work was started in 1342–1343 in Sivas and is based on an Arabic folk tale, written in the epic-lyrical genre. It is the first rendition of the folktale in the literature of Turkic languages. The work recounts the tragic love story of Varqa and Gülşāh, the son and daughter of two brothers who were leaders of the Bani Shaiba tribe. Despite their love for each other, various incidents prevent them from marrying. In the end, Gülşāh marries a local king. After being falsely informed that Gülşāh had died, Varqa takes his own life. Upon visiting Varqa's grave, Gülşāh also ends her own life. The poem is divided into six parts, each called a mejlis (lit. 'session'), and contains twelve ghazals (a form of amatory poem) that the heroes sing to each other. Meddah incorporated both written and spoken forms of folk literature into his writing at the end of each mejlis. The language of the work is very simple and contains many repetitions. The Turkish scholar Orhan Aytuğ Tolu believes that Meddah wrote the poem "as if he were telling a story in a public assembly". The writer Grace Martin Smith also shares a similar view, stating that the work is "ideally suited to be part of the repertory of an itinerant Anatolian story teller". Smith considers the work to be the "first Anatolian Turki[c] romantic narrative poem", which, like all other Turkic works of that time, has a strong Persian influence.

Meddah has several other notable works. One of them is Ghazavātnāmah, an Azerbaijani masnavi (a poem written in rhyming couplets) that uses the same metre as Varqa va Gülşāh. It spans nine a half folios long and recounts tales of the Caliph Ali, cousin and son-in-law of the Islamic prophet Muhammad. Another work is Pandnāmah, a brief masnavi comprising only thirteen lines. It imparts a message of inspiration towards righteous conduct and is filled with spiritual and Sufi notions. The scholar İlyas Kayaokay believes that Pandnāmah is not a separate work, but rather a part of Ghazavātnāmah. In 2018, a work thought to belong to Darir from Erzurum, another Anatolian Turkic poet, was revealed to belong to Meddah after a new copy of the work was discovered in the Algerian National Library. The work, titled Qiṣṣah-i Yūsuf, is a 2,000-couplets-long masnavi that tells the life of Joseph and the story of Yusuf (Joesph) and Zulaikha.

Other works include Dāstān-i Iblīs 'Aleyh al-La'nah, an Azerbaijani masnavi translated from an Arabic work with many additions by Meddah, consisting of 240 couplets. Another work is Maqtal-i Hüseyn, an Azerbaijani masnavi that recounts the Battle of Karbala, a military engagement in 680 CE between the army of the second Umayyad Caliph Yazid I and a small army led by Husayn ibn Ali, the grandson of Muhammad. The work consists of almost 3,000 couplets and is translated from a work of the same name by Ebû Mihnef, a 14th-century Umayyad historian. It was written in August 1362 and, like Varqa va Gülşāh, uses the mejlis form. Meddah also incorporated many folk sayings and elements of oral literature into the work, as well as several references to verses in the Quran. However, according to the Italian Turkologist Alessio Bombaci and the French Turkologist Irène Mélikoff, this work is actually attributed to Şadi Meddah, a writer from Kastamonu. Khāmūshnāmah, a Persian masnavi written in 1300 in Erzincan, is another work that is occasionally ascribed to Yusuf Meddah.

== Legacy ==
Meddah's poetry played a role in shaping the Azerbaijani literary language, and he is regarded as key figure in the early development of Azerbaijani literature. He lived and wrote during a time when Eastern Anatolia was a hub of Azerbaijani literature, and his contributions were significant in establishing the region as such.
