= 1296 in poetry =

This article covers 1296 in poetry.

== Deaths ==
- Philippe de Rémi (born 1247), French jurist, royal official and poet
- Dnyaneshwar (born 1275), Maharashtran saint, poet, philosopher and yogi
