= Ayocuan Cuetzpaltzin =

Ayocuan
- Born: Second Half of the 15th Century
- Died: Early 16th Century

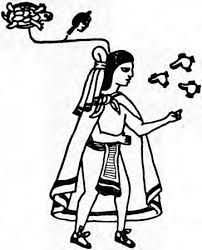
Ayocuan Cuetzpaltzin, tlamatini of Puebla.

Ayocuan, the son of Cuetzpaltzin the Elder, was from the city of Puebla according to Historia Tolteca-Chichimeca. His father governed the towns of Cohuayocan and Cuauhtepec during the 15th century. He lost his domain in 1441 when he suffered a joint attack by the people of Coatlinchan, Cholula, Huexotzinco, and Tlaxcala. Ayocuan was educated in the town of Quimixtlan.

== Poetry ==
Ayocuan has been remembered as a poet. Several songs reference him.

Like many other prominent Mesoamerican poets, the theme of Ayocuan's poems center around the brevity of the human life span. He also recognizes the imperfections of humanity. Ayocuan is referred to as a teohua (priest) in works by contemporary poets.

Poems attributed to Ayocuan include:

- Ma Huel Manin Tlalli (Let the Earth Forever Remain)
- Ayn Ilhuicac Itic (From Within the Heavens)
- Huexotzinco Icuic (Besieged, Hated, Huexotzinco Would Be)
