= Pedro Manuel Jiménez de Urrea =

Spanish Renaissance poet and playwright

Pedro Manuel de Urrea (1486 – 10 October 1535) was a Spanish Renaissance poet and playwright. He was known for his villancicos and romances (aka the Spanish ballad). A court poet under the crown of Aragon, his mother was the Countess of Aranda. His book of verse, Cancionero, was published in 1513. As a playwright, he adapted the Spanish novel La Celestina for the stage under the title Égloga. The novel also served as the basis for his La penitencia de amor.
