= Jean Molinet =

French poet (1435–1507)

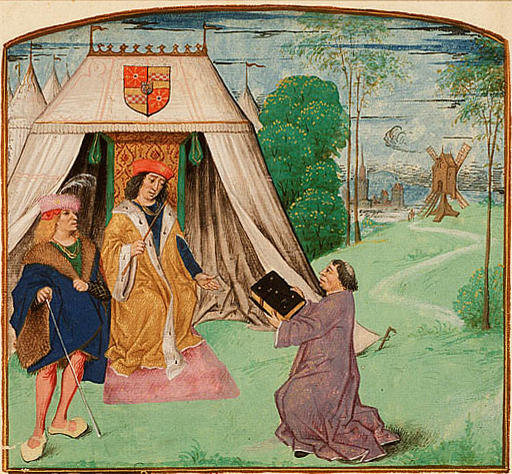
Jean Molinet presents his book to Philip of Cleves

Jean Molinet (1435 – 23 August 1507) was a French poet, chronicler, and composer. He is best remembered for his prose translation of Roman de la rose.

Born in Desvres, which is now part of France, he studied in Paris. He entered the service of Charles, Duke of Burgundy in 1463, becoming secretary to Georges Chastellain; in 1464 he wrote La Complainte de Grèce, a political work presenting the Burgundian side in current affairs. He replaced Chastellain as historiographer in 1475, and he was also the librarian of Margaret of Austria. His chronicle covered the years 1474 to 1504, and was only published in 1828 after being edited by J. A. Buchon. It is considered inferior to Chastellain's chronicle, possessing less historical value.

He is considered to belong to the network of poets called the Grands Rhétoriqueurs, characterised by their excessive use of puns and technical virtuosity. His nephew Jean Lemaire de Belges spent some time with him at Valenciennes, and Lemaire considered himself a disciple of the elder writer.

In 1501, he became canon of the church of Notre-Dame in Valenciennes, and he died there on 23 August 1507.

Molinet was also a composer, although only one work, the rondeau Tart ara mon cueur sa plaisance, can be reliably attributed to him; however, this work, an early chanson for four voices (most were for three), was extremely popular, as evidenced by the wide distribution of copies. He is also remembered for the elegy he wrote on the death of Johannes Ockeghem, Nymphes des bois, set by Josquin des Prez as part of his renowned motet La déploration sur la mort de Johannes Ockeghem. Of other contemporary composers, both Antoine Busnois and Loyset Compère carried on correspondence with him.

Historian Johan Huizinga quotes some anti-clerical lines of Molinet's from a series of wishes for the New Year: "Let us pray God that the Jacobins/May eat the Augustinians,/And that the Carmelites may be hanged/With the cords of the Minorites."
