= Arakida Moritake =

Japanese poet

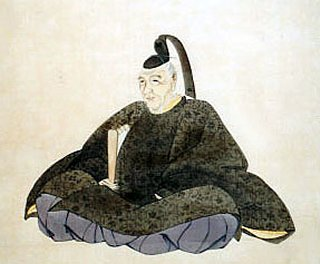
Arakida Moritake

Arakida Moritake (荒木田 守武, 1473 – August 30, 1549) was a Japanese poet who excelled in the fields of waka, renga, and in particular haikai. He studied renga with Sōgi. He was the son of Negi Morihide, and a Shintoist. At the age of 69, he became head priest of the Inner Ise Shrine.

Moritake's most famous poem:

A fallen blossom
returning to the bough, I thought --
But no, a butterfly.
(Translation by Steven D. Carter)
