= Badr Shirvani =

Persian poet

- Born: 1387 Shamakhi, Shirvan (present-day Azerbaijan)
- Died: 1450 (aged 62–63) Probably Shamakhi
- Occupation: Poet

Badr Shirvani (Persian: بدر شيرواني; sometimes Romanized Shirwani; 1387–1450) was a Persian poet. He spent most of his career at the court of the Shirvanshahs, but received patronage from other rulers as well.

== Early life ==
Badr was born in Shamakhi in Shirvan (present-day Azerbaijan) to a certain Hajji Shams al-Din, a seemingly wealthy figure. Badr's father paid little attention to him after his mother died. Little is known about his education; according to his own writings, Badr "was precocious and began writing poetry at the age of ten or eleven". Most information about Badr's life stems from his own works.

== Work ==
The majority of Badr's divan consists of "panegyric odes" (qasidas). Most of these "odes" are dedicated to the ruling Shirvanshah dynasty and the court, in particular Ibrahim I (r. 1378–1418) and Khalil I (r. 1418–1463). Badr however, did not devote himself exclusively to writing about the Shirvanshahs and the elite of Shirvan. He also received patronage from the Paduspanid ruler Kayumarth I (r. ca. 1400–1453), the Kara Koyunlu ruler Jahan Shah (r. 1434–1467), and the Timurid ruler Shah Rukh (r. 1409–1447), and thus wrote poems for all three as well.

Though Badr may have travelled in order to present these poems to Kayumarth, Jahan Shah and Shah Rukh in person, he continued to live most of his life in Shirvan. According to Dawlatshah Samarqandi, Badr met Katibi Nishapuri "when the latter visited Shirvan". Throughout his work, Badr compared himself on more than one occasion to Khaqani, who worked at the Shirvanshah court some two centuries earlier, and like him, wrote many works filled with panegyric text. The works of Khaqani and Badr Shirvani differ quite significantly however. Khaqani's poetry is characterized by "learned complexity and allusiveness", whereas that of Badr primarily contains "direct and flowing diction".

Other than his panegyric odes, his divan consisted of many other poetic forms which were significant at the time, in particular "occasional, monthematic qit'a and the lyric ghazal". Badr wrote verses and poems in Arabic, Azeri Turkish and various Caspian Sea dialects of Persian. According to Paul E. Losensky, this reflects "the multilingual environment" in which Badr lived. Badr's work also serves as documentation about the Persian and Fahlavi dialect of Shirvan.

In 1985, Badr's works were "recovered, edited and published". According to Losensky, this was made possible thanks to a unique manuscript which had seemingly been prepared shortly after Badr's death.

== Death ==
Badr died in 1450, probably in his native Shamakhi. The location of his grave remains unknown.

== Sources ==
- Lornejad, Siavash; Doostzadeh, Ali (2012). Arakelova, Victoria; Asatrian, Garnik (eds.). On the modern politicization of the Persian poet Nezami Ganjavi (PDF). Caucasian Centre for Iranian Studies. Archived from the original (PDF) on 2022-09-14.
- Losensky, Paul E. (2009). "Badr Shīrvānī". In Fleet, Kate; Krämer, Gudrun; Matringe, Denis; Nawas, John; Rowson, Everett (eds.). Encyclopaedia of Islam (3rd ed.). Brill Online. ISSN 1873-9830.
