= Olivier Basselin =

French poet

Olivier Basselin (pronounced [ɔlivje baslɛ̃]; c. 1400 – c. 1450) was a French poet whose drinking songs became famous under the name Vaux-de-Vire, that later became known as vaudeville.

== Life ==
He was born in the Val-de-Vire in Normandy about the end of the 14th century. He was by occupation a fuller, and tradition still points out the site of his mill. His drinking songs became famous under the name of Vaux-de-Vire, corrupted in modern times into "vaudeville." From various traditions, it may be gathered that Basselin was killed in the English wars about the middle of the century, possibly at the Battle of Formigny (1450).

== Literary legacy ==
At the beginning of the 17th century a collection of songs was published by a Norman lawyer, Jean Le Houx, purporting to be the work of Olivier Basselin. There seems to be very little doubt that Le Houx was himself the author of the songs attributed to Basselin, as well as of those he acknowledged as his own.

It has been suggested that Basselin's name may be safely connected with some songs preserved in the Bibliothèque Nationale at Paris, and published at Caen in 1866 by M. Armand Gasté. The question is discussed in M.V. Patard's La Vérité dans la question Olivier Basselin et Jean le Houx à propos du Vau-de-Vire (1897). Gasté's edition (1875) of the Vaux-de-Vire was translated (1885) by James Patrick Muirhead.

A poem by Henry Longfellow entitled "Oliver Basselin", first published in 1858 along with "The Courtship of Miles Standish", memorializes Basselin and his songs as outliving the baron, knights and abbot of his time since, quoting from the poem, "the poets memory here, of the landscape makes a part: Like the river swift and clear flows through many a heart:..."
