= Azari Tusi =

Iranian Sufi and poet

Azari-e Tusi (Persian: آذری طوسی) Shaikh Jalaluddini Alii Hamza ibni Malik Hashimii Bayhaqii Isfarainii Marvazi (1380 in Esfarayen – 1462 in Esfarayen) was a Persian poet. Azari-e Tusi lived for a while in Tus.

Azari was a poet in Bahmani Sultanate. The name of his father was Ismail Shakh Baghdadi Ali ibn Malik. His nickname in some literature and tazkiras is Nuriddin. His book Javahir-ul-Asrar was written in 1430. Azari was born in Isfarain and from his early years he began writing poems and signed as Azari.

He made pilgrimage to Mecca twice by foot and wrote a book there which he called Saye-al-sabak. After returning from the pilgrimage, he went to India and went to Ahmad Shakh Bahmani's castle.

== Books ==
- Bahmanname
- Imomiya
- Samarot
- Javoir-ul-Asror
- Mafoteh-ul-Asror
