= Hieronymus Angerianus =

Hieronymus Angerianus or Girolamo Angeriano (died 1535) was an influential Italian Neo-Latin poet from Apulia. He retired at a young age from the life of the Neapolitan court, to the family estates at Ariano di Puglia.

His Erōtoπαιγνιον (Erotopaegnion), an epigram collection, was published in 1512 in Florence. He was published in 1582 in the Poetae Tres Elegantissimi (Paris), with Joannes Secundus and Michelle Marullo.

Sources differ considerably on his birth year, with some stating 1470, others giving "c. 1480" and another c. 1490.

== English literature ==
His influence has been traced in Giles Fletcher. He was later translated by Walter Harte and Thomas Moore.
