= Janus Pannonius =

Croatian-Hungarian poet

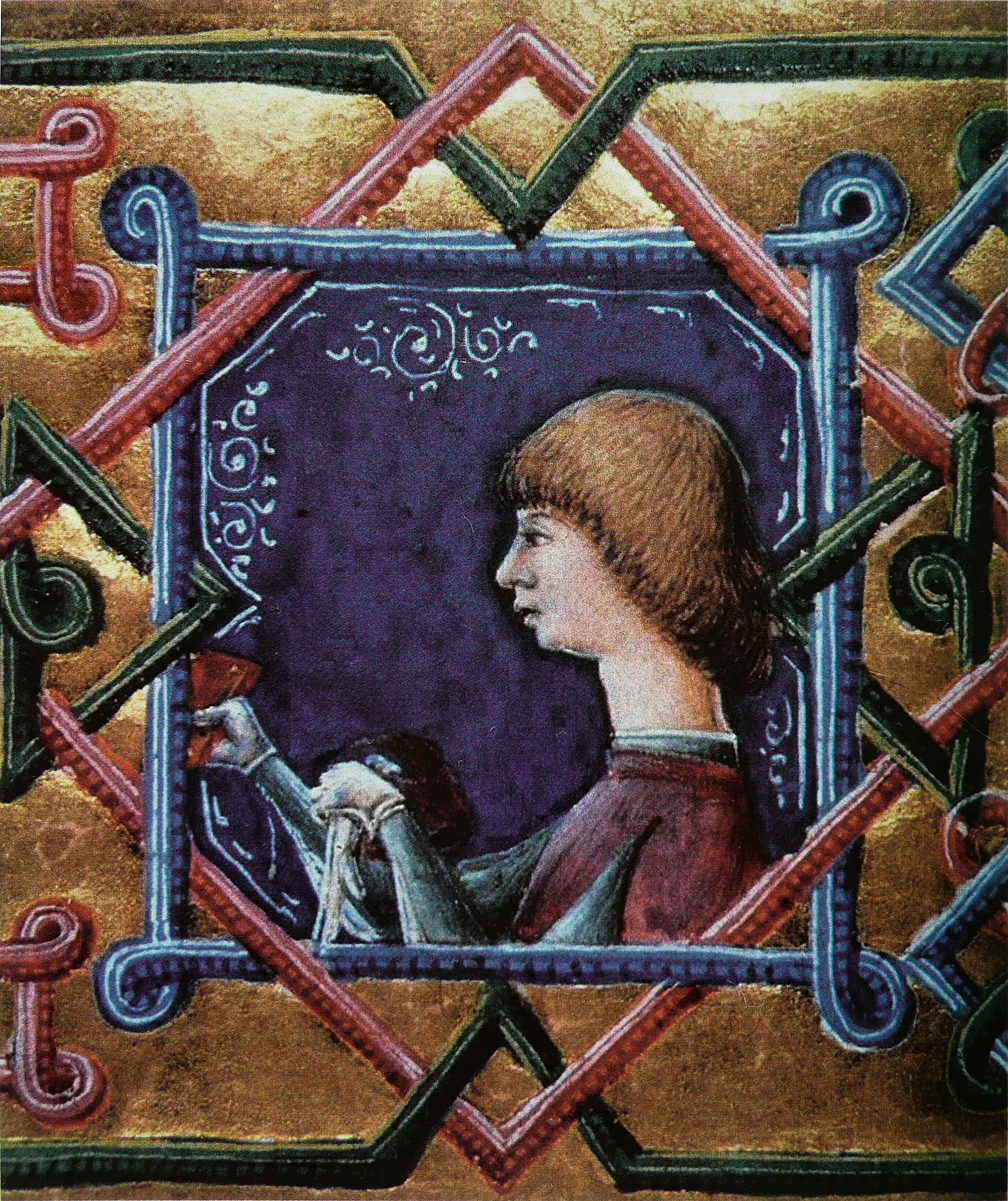
Portrait of Pannonius, from a codex of Plautus

Janus Pannonius (Hungarian: Csezmiczei János or Cesencei János, Latin: Ioannes Pannonius, Croatian: Ivan Česmički; 29 August 1434 – 27 March 1472) was an influential intellectual in the Kingdom of Hungary, a Latinist, poet, diplomat and Bishop of Pécs. He was the most significant poet of the Renaissance in the Kingdom of Hungary and one of the better-known figures of humanist poetry in Europe.

== Life ==
Born in Slavonia, Janus's father's social status and relation to the nobility is unclear. His mother, Borbála Vitéz, was the sister of John Vitéz.

Pope Pius II wrote that Pannonius was of Slavonian origin (de origine Slavonica). His biographer and friend Vespasiano da Bisticci said that he was of Slavic nationality. According to Ronsano of Palermo, he was from Dalmatia (di natione Dalmata). M. Franičević, in citing Ronsano, notes that many Italians saw all “Croats” as Dalmatians. Ludovik Tuberon Crijević, writing of Pannonius, says that he was born a Slav (genere itidem Sclavenum) in that part of interior Dalmatia that lies between the Sava and Drava rivers.

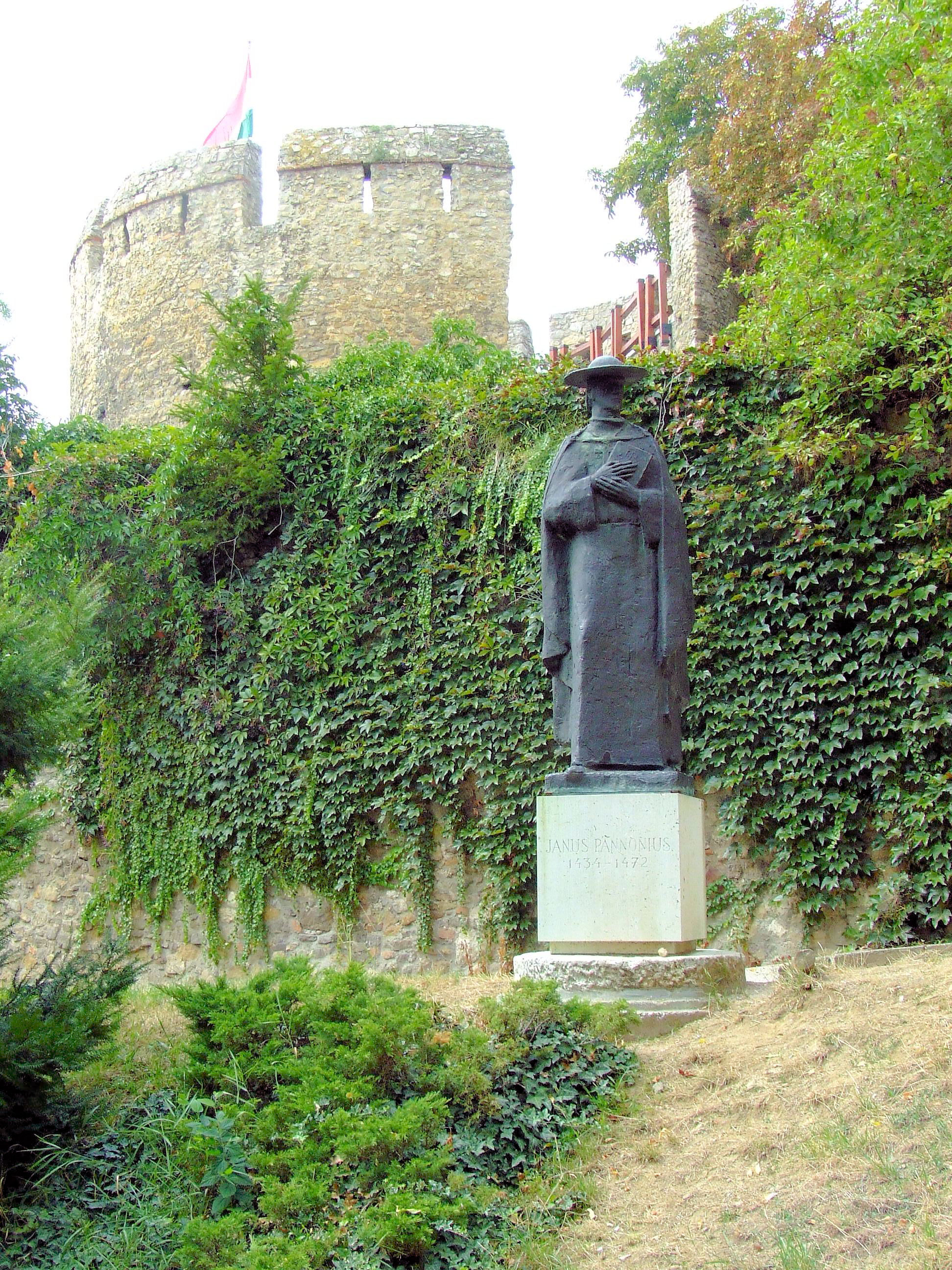
Modern statue of Pannonius in Pécs

Pannonius was brought up by his mother; in 1447 his uncle sent him to Italy for a humanist schooling. He attended the School of Guarino da Verona at Ferrara, where the pupils were educated in Latin and Greek authors under the guidance of a noted teacher of the Italian Renaissance. The boy was considered the brightest pupil of his generation by both his teachers and fellow-students. He wrote poetry according to the rules of classical prosody; he was around thirteen when he wrote his first epigrams. His higher education was completed at the University of Padua in canon law. After making an educational tour of Rome, he returned to Hungary in 1458, the year of Matthias's accession to the throne.

For a time, he worked at the Royal Chancery, and soon was appointed as the Bishop of Pécs and later Vice-Chancellor of the country. Janus Pannonius was an influential intellectual in the kingdom; he kept his connections with some of the leading philosophers of his time. He also collected a significant library of humanist works (probably dispersed in 1526).

He served as the Ban of Slavonia in 1469.

He died in the Medvedgrad castle near Zagreb.

János Zsambóky (Johannes Sambucus) and Count Sámuel Teleki prepared the first editions of the poet’s opera omnia.

== Sources ==
- Bietenholz, Peter G.; Deutscher, Thomas Brian, eds. (2003). "Janus Pannonius". Contemporaries of Erasmus: A Biographical Register of the Renaissance and Reformation. University of Toronto Press. pp. 233–234. ISBN 978-0-8020-8577-1.
- Birnbaum, Marianna D. (1981). Janus Pannonius, poet and politician. Works of the Yugoslav Academy of Sciences and Arts philology department. Vol. 56. Yugoslav Academy of Sciences and Arts. OCLC 461824985.
- Sánchez, Alfonso Lombana (2023). Un libro sobre Janus Pannonius (in Spanish). ISBN 978-84-19782-33-5.
- V. A. Fine, John Jr. (2010). When Ethnicity Did Not Matter in the Balkans: A Study of Identity in Pre-Nationalist Croatia, Dalmatia, and Slavonia in the Medieval and Early-Modern Periods. University of Michigan Press. ISBN 978-0-472-02560-2.

== Works ==
- Opera, Basel, 1555
