= Latin poetry =

Poetry of the Latin language

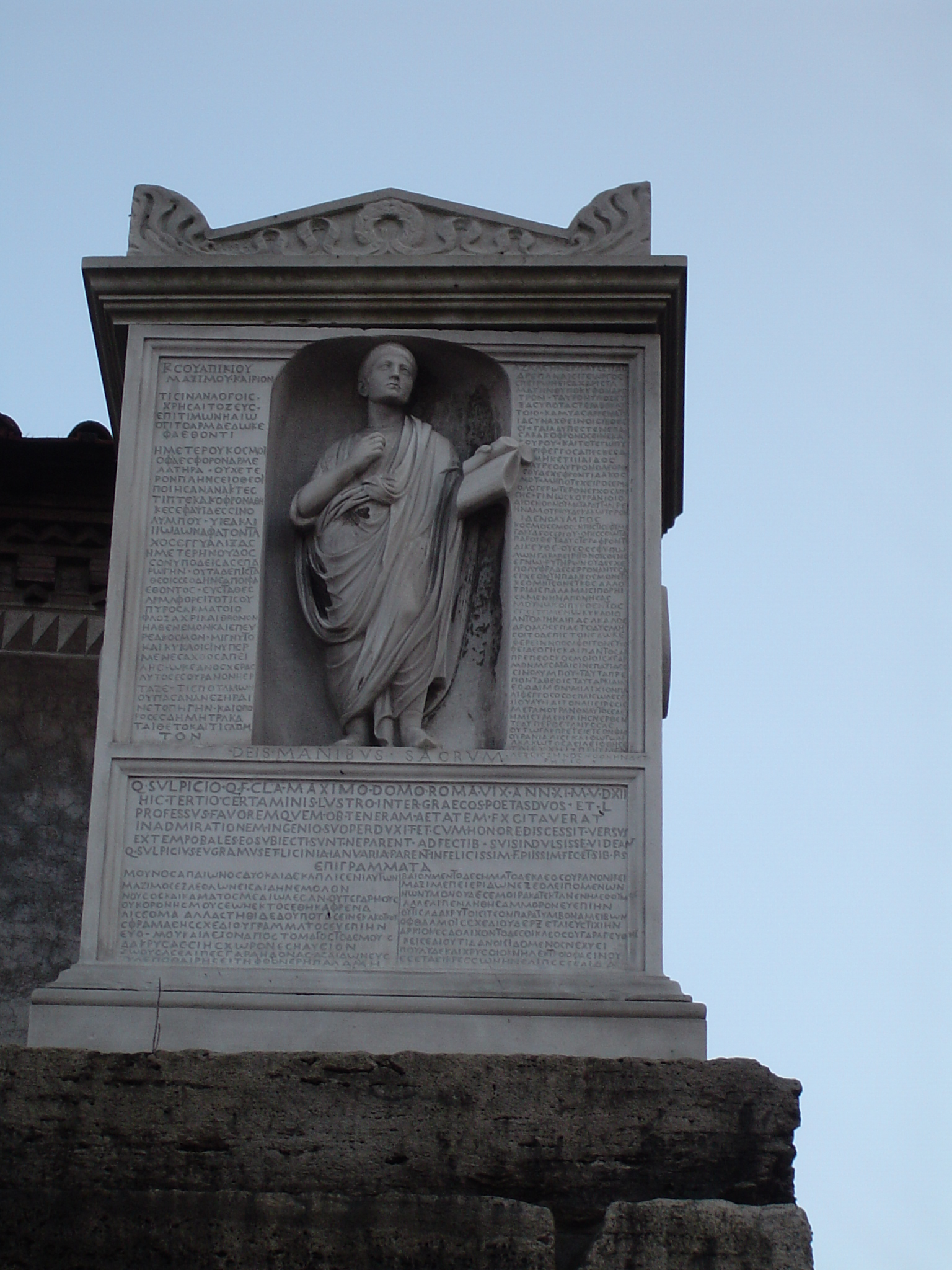
Memorial Stone of Quintus Sulpicius Maximus, Rome, Italy. First century AD; located at the Porta Salaria, Rome, commemorating an 11-year-old who won a poetry contest in 95 AD.

The history of Latin poetry can be understood as the adaptation of Greek models. The verse comedies of Plautus, the earliest surviving examples of Latin literature, are estimated to have been composed around 205–184 BC.

== History ==
Scholars conventionally date the start of Latin literature to the first performance of a play in verse by a Greek slave, Livius Andronicus, at Rome in 240 BC. Livius translated Greek New Comedy for Roman audiences, using meters that were basically those of Greek drama, modified to the needs of Latin. His successors Plautus (c. 254 – 184 BC) and Terence (c. 195/185 – c. 159? BC) further refined the borrowings from the Greek stage and the prosody of their verse is substantially the same as for classical Latin verse.

Ennius (239 – 169 BC), virtually a contemporary of Livius, introduced the traditional meter of Greek epic, the dactylic hexameter, into Latin literature; he substituted it for the jerky Saturnian meter in which Livius had been composing epic verses. Ennius moulded a poetic diction and style suited to the imported hexameter, providing a model for "classical" poets such as Virgil and Ovid.

The late republic saw the emergence of Neoteric poets, notably Catullus—rich young men from the Italian provinces, conscious of metropolitan sophistication, and looking to the scholarly Alexandrian poet Callimachus for inspiration. Catullus shared the Alexandrian's preference for short poems and wrote within a variety of meters borrowed from Greece, including Aeolian forms such as hendecasyllabic verse, the Sapphic stanza and Greater Asclepiad, as well as iambic verses such as the choliamb and the iambic tetrameter catalectic (a dialogue meter borrowed from Old Comedy).

Horace, whose career crossed the divide between the Roman republic and empire, followed Catullus' lead in employing Greek lyrical forms, identifying with Alcaeus of Mytilene, composing Alcaic stanzas, and also with Archilochus, composing poetic invectives in the Iambus tradition (in which he adopted the metrical form of the Epode or "Iambic Distich"). Horace was a contemporary of Virgil and, like the epic poet, he wrote verses in dactylic hexameter, but in a conversational and epistolary style. Virgil's hexameters are generally regarded as "the supreme metrical system of Latin literature."

== See also ==
- Prosody (Latin) - the structural basis of verse in Latin
