= Grands Rhétoriqueurs =

The grands rhétoriqueurs or simply the "rhétoriqueurs" is the name given to a group of poets from 1460 to 1530 (or from the generation of François Villon (not rhétoriqueur himself) to Clément Marot) working in Northern France, Flanders, and the Duchy of Burgundy whose ostentatious poetic production was dominated by (1) an extremely rich rhyme scheme and experimentation with assonance and puns and (2) experimentation with typography and the graphic use of letters, including the creation of verbal rebuses. The group is also credited with promoting alternation between "masculine" rhymes (lines ending in a sound other than a mute "e") and "feminine" rhymes (lines ending in a mute "e").

Poets considered "Grands Rhétoriqueurs" include:

- Georges Chastellain (1415–1474)
- Jean Molinet (1435–1507)
- Jean Marot (1450–1526) father of Clément Marot
- Jean Meschinot (1420–1491) (active from 1450 to 1490)
- Jean Robertet (active from 1460 to 1500)
- Guillaume Crétin (1461–1525)
- Jean Lemaire de Belges (1473–1516)
- Jean Bouchet (1476–1555)
- André de La Vigne (active from 1485 to 1515)
- Octavien de Saint-Gelays (active from 1490 to 1505)
- Jean d'Auton (active from 1499 to 1528)
- Pierre Gringore (1475–1538) (active from 1500 to 1535)

The following poets are sometimes also grouped with the rhétoriqueurs:

- Guillaume Alexis (active from 1450 to 1490)
- Jacques Milet (active from 1450 to 1466)
- Henri Baude (active from 1460 to 1495)
- Jean de Castel (active from 1460 to 1480)
- Roger de Collerye (1470–1538)
- Jean Parmentier (active from 1515 to 1530)

The expression "rhétoriqueurs" is a misnomer and was not used by the poets themselves (who used the term "orateurs"). The earliest use of "rhétoriqueurs" can be found in Guillaume Coquillart's Droitz Nouveaux (1481) where it refers to lawyers; nineteenth-century literary historian Charles d'Héricault misread the term as designating poets. The term comes from the publication of several treatises on versification in French in the 15th century that used the term "rhetoric" in their titles, such as in Arts de seconde rhétorique ("Arts of Second Rhetoric", "first rhetoric" being prose and "second rhetoric" being verse), or "rhétorique vulgaire" ("vernacular" as opposed to "Latin" rhetoric). The implication in these poetic manuals was that rhyming was a form or branch of rhetoric. Although the term "rhétoriqueurs" is an anachronistic label, it is generally seen to be useful in bringing into view the literary activity of this network of poets. It was used in the title of Paul Zumthor's anthology in 1978.

The "rhétoriqueurs", alike in rejecting any taint of the vulgar world outside noble courts, were not a homogeneous group or organized literary movement, and there were great differences between each author's individual creative project. Nevertheless, these authors show great similarities in poetic invention and sound experimentation and represent a period of literary transition from the Middle Ages to the Renaissance. The multiplicity of readings in certain texts has been compared to 15th century polyphonic music from the Burgundian School and Franco-Flemish School (such as the music of Johannes Ockeghem), and their fascination with "copia", verbal games and the difficulties of interpretation link them to such Renaissance figures as Erasmus and Rabelais.

The vital realism and pessimism of François Villon, and his countercultural vagabond life, set him apart from the rhétoriqueurs. From the late 1540s on, many of the "rhétoriqueurs" were rejected by the French circle of poets around Pierre de Ronsard (sometimes called La Pléiade), who considered them representatives of an outdated medieval tradition. Some of this disdain may have also been tied to class and chauvinism: many of the "rhétoriqueurs" were non-noble poets and writers working for the court of the Duchy of Burgundy, while Ronsard's circle was entirely French and dominated by nobles.

The "Grands Rhétoriqueurs" were utterly forgotten, until a revival of interest by specialists in the 19th and 20th centuries. Their verbal games and aural experimentation have been praised by contemporary literary groups, including the writers of the Oulipo movement.
