= Italian poetry =

Category of Italian literature

Italian poetry is a category of Italian literature. Italian poetry has its origins in the thirteenth century and has heavily influenced the poetic traditions of many European languages, including that of English.

== Features ==
- Italian prosody is accentual and syllabic, much like English. However, in Italian all syllables are perceived as having the same length, while in English that role is played by feet. The most common metrical line is the hendecasyllable, which is very similar to English iambic pentameter. Shorter lines like the settenario are used as well.
- The earliest Italian poetry is rhymed. Rhymed forms of Italian poetry include the sonnet (sonnetto), terza rima, ottava rima, the canzone and the ballata. Beginning in the sixteenth century, unrhymed hendecasyllabic verse, known as verso sciolto, became a popular alternative (compare blank verse in English).
- Feminine (unstressed) rhymes are generally preferred over masculine rhymes.
- Apocopic forms (uom for uomo, amor for amore) and contractions (spirto for spirito) are common. Expanded forms of words which have become contracted in ordinary use (cittade for città, virtute for virtù) are also frequently encountered, particularly for the sake of ending lines with feminine rhymes.
- Diaeresis may be used to break up diphthongs and to make semivowels into full vowels. For instance, the trisyllabic word sapienza can be turned into the tetrasyllabic sapïenza. The rules governing when diaeresis is permissible are complex, and it occurs more commonly with learnèd vocabulary than with colloquialisms.

As with other European languages, Italian poets have become increasingly open to experimentation in recent centuries and free verse (verso libero) is written by many Italian poets.

== Important Italian poets ==
- Giacomo da Lentini: a 13th-century poet who is believed to have invented the sonnet.
- Guido Cavalcanti (c.1255 - 1300) Tuscan poet, and a key figure in the Dolce Stil Novo movement.
- Dante Alighieri (1265 - 1321) wrote Divina Commedia, one of the pinnacles of medieval literature.
- Francesco Petrarca (1304 - 1374) famous for developing the Petrarchan sonnet in a collection of 366 poems called Canzoniere.
- Guido Guinizelli (1230 — 1275) moved from courtly love to mystical and spiritual philosophical spirituality
- Matteo Maria Boiardo (1441 – 1494) wrote the epic poem Orlando innamorato
- Ludovico Ariosto (1474 – 1533) wrote the epic poem Orlando furioso (1516).
- Giovanni di Bernardo Rucellai (1474 – 1525) wrote Le Api, a pioneering work in versi sciolti
- Torquato Tasso (1544 – 1595) wrote the epic La Gerusalemme liberata (1580) in which he describes imaginary combats between Christians and Muslims at the end of the First Crusade.
- Ugo Foscolo (1778 - 1827): best known for his poem "Dei Sepolcri".
- Giacomo Leopardi (1798 – 1837): highly valued for his Canti and Operette morali, author of L'infinito, one of the most famous poems of Italian literary history.
- Giosuè Carducci (1835 - 1907) won the Nobel Prize in Literature in 1906.
- Giovanni Pascoli (1855 - 1912) symbolist poet, thirteen times winner of the "Certamen poeticum Hoeufftianum".
- Gabriele D'Annunzio (1863 - 1938) poet and novelist of the Decadent Movement.
- Guido Gozzano (1883-1916) poet of the Crepuscolari Movement, best known for his collection "I colloqui" (1911).
- Umberto Saba (1883 - 1957)
- Trilussa (1871 - 1950)
- Giuseppe Ungaretti (1888 - 1970)
- Eugenio Montale (1896 – 1981) won the Nobel Prize in Literature in 1975.
- Salvatore Quasimodo (1901 – 1968) won the Nobel Prize in Literature in 1959.
- Cesare Pavese (1908 – 1950)
- Leonardo Sinisgalli (1908 – 1981)
- Alfonso Gatto (1909 – 1976)
- Antonia Pozzi (1912 - 1938)
- Mario Luzi (1914 – 2005)
- Pier Paolo Pasolini (1922 - 1975): better known as a filmmaker, he was also an accomplished poet.
- Alda Merini (1931 - 2009)

== See also ==
- List of Italian language poets
