= Songs to the dead =

Romanian ceremonial funeral songs

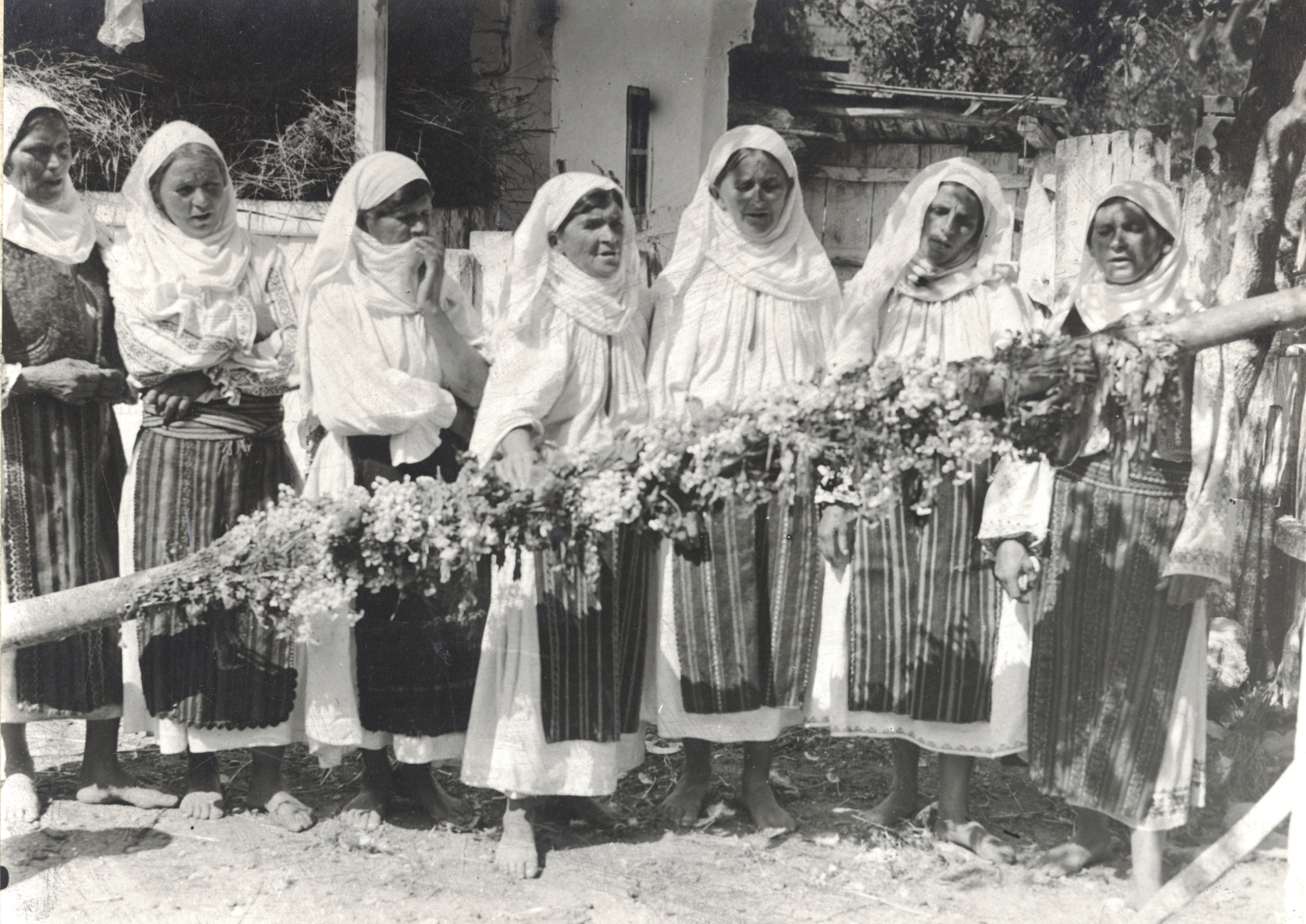
- Song of the Fir Tree in the yard (Runcu, Gorj, Oltenia). Photo by Iosif Berman, 1930.
- Native name: Romanian: Cântece ale mortului
- Stylistic origins: Ceremonial funeral songs, Romanian traditional music
- Cultural origins: Romania
- Typical instruments: Vocals

Subgenres
- Song of the Dawns, Song of the Fir Tree; Zorile, Bradul

Songs to the dead (Romanian: cântece ale mortului; Romanian pronunciation: [ˈkɨn.te.t͡ʃe ˈa.le ˈmor.tu.luj]) are Romanian ceremonial funeral songs performed at strictly defined moments of the rite, from death to burial. They are found chiefly in Oltenia, the Banat, southern Transylvania, and western Moldavia (the historical region). Unlike improvised individual funeral laments known as bocets, songs for the dead have a formal ritual function and are sung by a group of women specially invited to lead this part of the ceremony and, as a rule, not closely related to the deceased.

The core of the repertory consists of the "Dawns" or "Song of the Dawns" (Zorile, Cântecul zorilor) and the "Song of the Fir Tree" (Bradul, Cântecul bradului). In the "Song of the Dawns", the singers address the dawns as sisters and ask them to delay sunrise while the deceased prepares for the "great journey". The "Song of the Fir Tree" accompanies all stages of the rite involving the ritual tree, from its selection in the forest to its installation on the grave. It is especially characteristic of the funerals of unmarried young people, functioning as a "posthumous wedding" and as a ritual compensation for a life cut short too early. Alongside these, the corpus also includes "journey songs", which instruct the deceased in the passage to the other world, and songs tied to individual moments of the ceremony: leave-taking, procession, and burial.

The term "songs to the dead" and the scholarly distinction between these songs and bocets became established in Romanian ethnomusicology after Constantin Brăiloiu's 1936 study, which first identified them as an independent ritual repertory. Subsequently, songs to the dead became the subject of typological and comparative research and received wide resonance in European culture through translations, musical compositions, and film. Today, the tradition survives only in a few rural communities and is endangered.

== Context ==
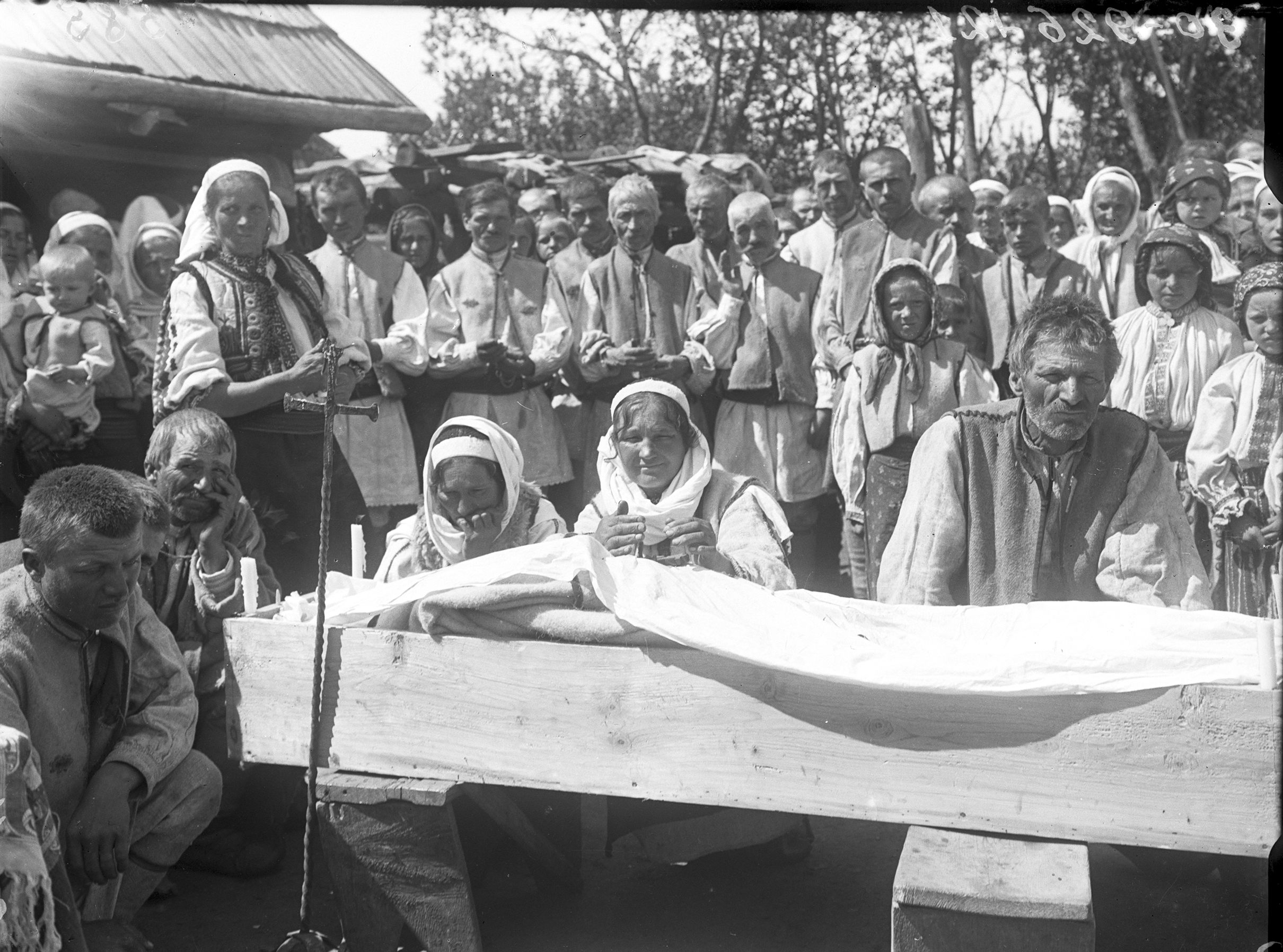
Funeral (Hunedoara, 1926). Photo by Denis Galloway.

The Romanian funeral rite comprises a complex of ritual actions in which musical accompaniment plays an important role. In mountain areas – Bukovina, Maramureș, and the Vrancea region – instrumental music is heard: signals on the bucium or playing on the fluier, imitating weeping and expressing sorrow (de jale). In Moldavia, lăutari sometimes perform "farewell songs" (de petrecanie). Vocal laments are widespread throughout; in Bukovina they may be accompanied by the large Moldavian fluier.

At the beginning of the 20th century, all vocal forms of the Romanian funeral rite were described as laments, under the influence of European folklore studies, which distinguished only that type. The Romanian ethnomusicologist Constantin Brăiloiu proposed a distinction: alongside emotional, improvisational lamentations – known as bocets, typically performed by relatives of the deceased or professional mourners without strict connection to specific stages of the ritual – he identified ceremonial songs, known as ale mortului ("[songs] to the dead").

Songs to the dead fulfill a ritual function: they are performed at strictly defined moments of the ceremony – from death to burial – by groups of women specially invited to lead this part of the rite and, as a rule, not closely related to the deceased. They are often performed antiphonally, with two groups of two or three singers (typically four or six in total) alternating responsorially, although the composition of the groups is not strictly fixed. Their principal area of distribution is Oltenia, the Banat, southern Transylvania, and western Moldavia.

== Main types ==
Based on materials from an ethnographic expedition in 1930 in Runcu (Gorj County, Oltenia), Constantin Brăiloiu distinguished three types of ceremonial funeral songs: the song of the fir tree, the songs of the dawn, and a group of songs associated with specific moments or actions of the ritual – "at the burial" (hăl de la gropniță), "from the room" (ale din hodaie), and "at the grave" (al țărînii). Within the latter type, he singled out as the most significant the "journey songs" (ale drumului), which describe the final journey of the deceased.

Mariana Kahane and Lucilia Georgescu-Stǎnculeanu, on the basis of a corpus of 514 pieces studied in 1988, identified a more ramified structure consisting of five groups. A central place is occupied by the "Dawns" (Zorile), with numerous subtypes – performed outside the house, inside, and along the road – some of which can be performed independently. Another group is the "Song of the Fir Tree" (Cântecul bradului), with all its ritual episodes, followed without interruption by the "Song of the Earth" (Cântecul pământului, Țărini), performed at the moment when the tree is set on the grave. Farewell songs (Plecarea) accompany the carrying out of the deceased from the house and the procession to the cemetery. Finally, in several villages of the Ținutul Pădurenilor area (Hunedoara County), a rare late type has been recorded – Harângul ("Song of the Bell"), which replaces ceremonial songs in the case of death away from the home village.

The complete cycle of songs was not performed everywhere: in some villages of Oltenia certain parts were absent, while in others ceremonial songs might not be performed at all. In a number of other regions, particularly in the Banat and western Transylvania, the system of imagery could change. Thus, figures from the songs such as the "Old Fairy" (Zâna bătrână), Gia Somogia, and Maica Irodie came to be associated with the Virgin Mary.

=== Song of the Dawns ===
- YouTube_social_white_circle_(2017) Song of the Dawns
- Zorile – Ioana Schiau, Cristina Pavel, Marița Grama, (Oltenia, 1939)
- Zorile de la amiază – Lena Preda & Ilca Lepăduș, (Banat, 1940)
- Zorile – Elena Butiuc, Filofteia Conuț, (Gorj, Oltenia, 1943)
- Zorile – Persida & Brândușa Popovici, (Banat, 1937/38)
- Zorile – Polina Popescu, Maria Popescu, (Gorj, Oltenia, 1940)

The "Song of the Dawns" or "Dawns" (Cântecul zorilor, Zorile; in the Banat – Strigarea zorilor, from striga, "to shout") opens the ritual cycle. The first dawn song, known as Zorile, Zorile (de) afară, Zorile (de) la fereastră, or Zorile de dimineaţă, is sung before sunrise by a group of women – usually in odd numbers (Note: In field recordings this condition is not always observed.) – near the house of the deceased (at the porch or veranda), facing east or toward the window, holding a candle and a sprig of basil. In the Banat, the women divide into two groups that sing alternately: one poses questions to the dawns, the other conveys their replies; the groups are positioned at two different corners of the house or even farther away, on higher ground, so that they can be heard throughout the village. Other dawn songs or their equivalents (Zorile din casă, Ale drumului, La lumânări, Zâna bătrână, Firul de trandafir, Zorile la amiază, Zorile de seară) are performed either before sunrise or at midnight, inside or outside the house, facing the window, or after midday in front of the house or along the road. (Note: The set of songs included among the dawn songs may appear contradictory, for example "Evening Dawns" (Zorile de seară). This is explained by the fact that in folk belief the dawns are associated primarily with fairies (zâne), rather than with the time of day.)

The performers address the dawns (zori – a feminine noun used only in the plural), calling them "sisters" and asking them to delay sunrise until everything necessary for the deceased's "great journey" has been prepared. In the text of the song, the dawns appear as anthropomorphic figures who "watch over and guide" the passage into the other world; this brings them close to the Ursitoare, figures of Romanian mythology who "allot fate". (Note: The Ursitoare are figures of Romanian mythology, emissaries of Fate who predetermine the destiny of the newborn. The name is connected with the verb Romanian: a ursi ("to predetermine; to assign a destiny"), derived from Latin: ordior, orsus sum – "to begin weaving" (cf. Greek: orízo – "to determine, establish"; Bulgarian: орисвам – "to foretell, predetermine [fate]"). Alongside them are the Ursele, three personified hypostases of Fate, compared with the Greek Moirai and Roman Parcae.) The motif of addressing the dawns is also found in Romanian Christmas colinde: singers perform them throughout the night and at daybreak ask the dawns not to hasten.

The song does not merely describe the journey of the deceased, but also enumerates everything prepared for it during the ceremony. The list of preparations – bread, meat, wine, rakia, a covering for the coffin, a cart with two oxen, and letters to notify relatives – corresponds to specific elements of the funeral rite. The motif of the wax "cake to give light on the road" is associated with the ritual candle rolled into a spiral. The deceased is described as a "white traveler" or "white wanderer" – images pointing to the dangerous journey which, according to folk belief, the dead undertake from the moment of death until their final entry into the other world.

=== Song of the Fir Tree ===
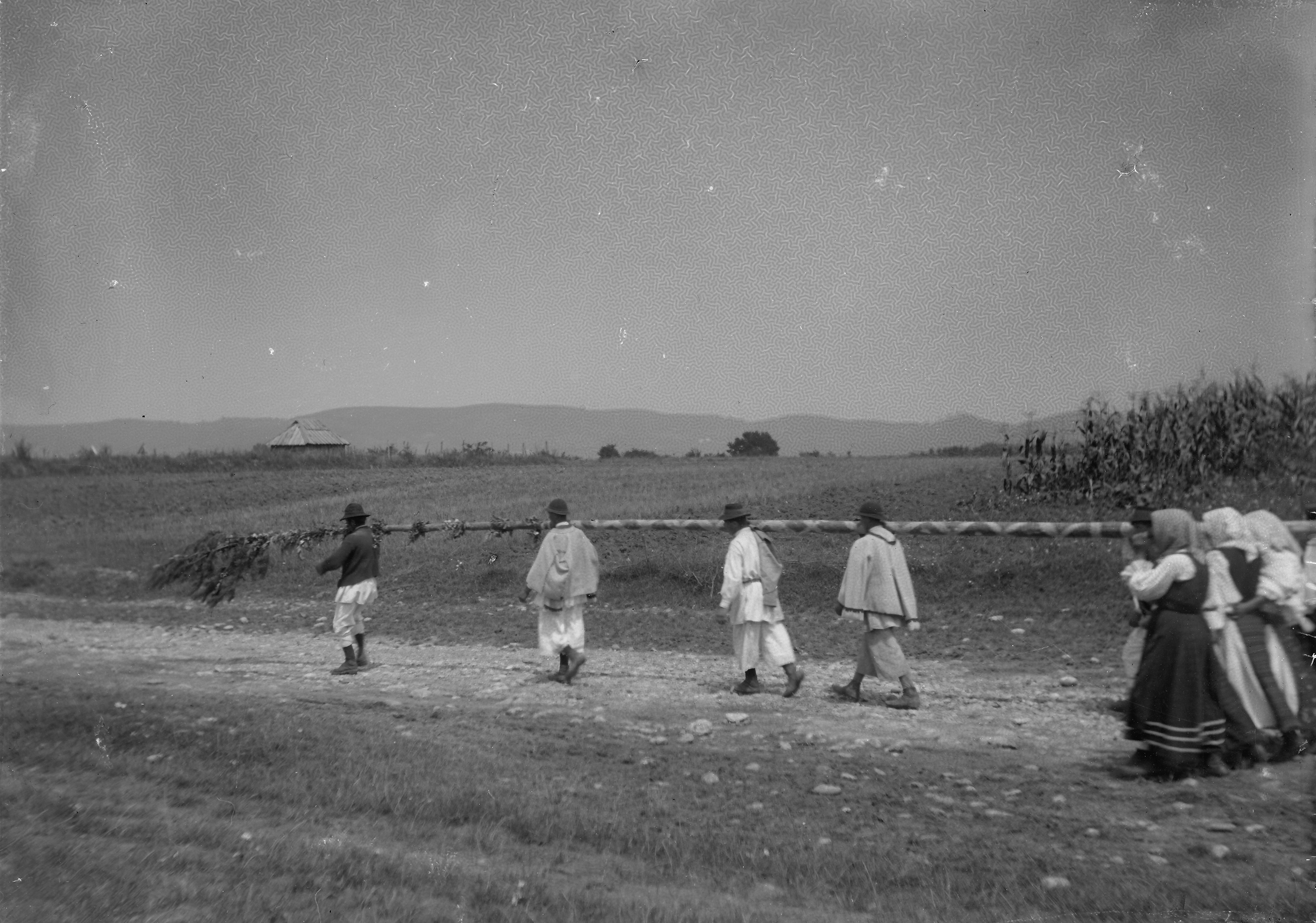
Transferring a fir tree to a grave (Hunedoara, Transylvania). Photo by Romulus Vuia, no later than 1928.

- YouTube_social_white_circle_(2017) Song of the Fir Tree
- Bradul – Ioana Schiau, Cristina Pavel, Marița Grama, (Gorj, Oltenia, 1939)
- Bradul – Maria Tărfăloagă & Maria Mojnean, (Oltenia, 1937)
- Cocosdaiul, (Sibiu, Transylvania, 1937)
- Bradul – Elena Butiuc, Filofteia Conuț, (Gorj, Oltenia, 1943)
- Al bradului în curte – Anuța Medrea, (Alba, Transylvania, 1937)
- Al bradului la cimitir – Anuța Medrea, (Alba, Transylvania, 1937)

The "Song of the Fir Tree" (Bradul, Cântecul bradului, Cocosdaiul) accompanies all stages of the rite involving the ritual tree (Note: In a number of regions, the coniferous tree (brad) in the funeral rite is understood as a symbolic "double" of the person and a substitute for the deceased; the motif of the "funeral tree" is also linked to wedding symbolism (especially in the death of unmarried men and women), and in some cases the tree could substitute for the body in a cenotaph (for example, in Bukovinian tradition up to the early 20th century).) – from its search in the forest to its installation on the grave. Several young relatives select and fell the tree in advance; on the day of burial, it is carried to the house of the deceased and thence to the cemetery. Each of the five ceremonial moments – from bringing the tree from the forest to the edge of the village, to the traditional decoration of the fir, the funeral procession, the approach to the burial place, and the final fixing of the tree in the ground – has its own song episode. The final episode passes without interruption into the "Song of the Earth".

The rite is especially characteristic of the funerals of unmarried young people: in such cases the fir becomes the center of a more complex ritual, known in folk tradition as the "posthumous wedding" (nunta mortului). The funeral takes the form of a wedding ceremony, and the tree acts as the bridegroom or bride of the deceased. In its function, this is a compensatory ritual: the young man or woman is "given back" what premature death deprived them of.

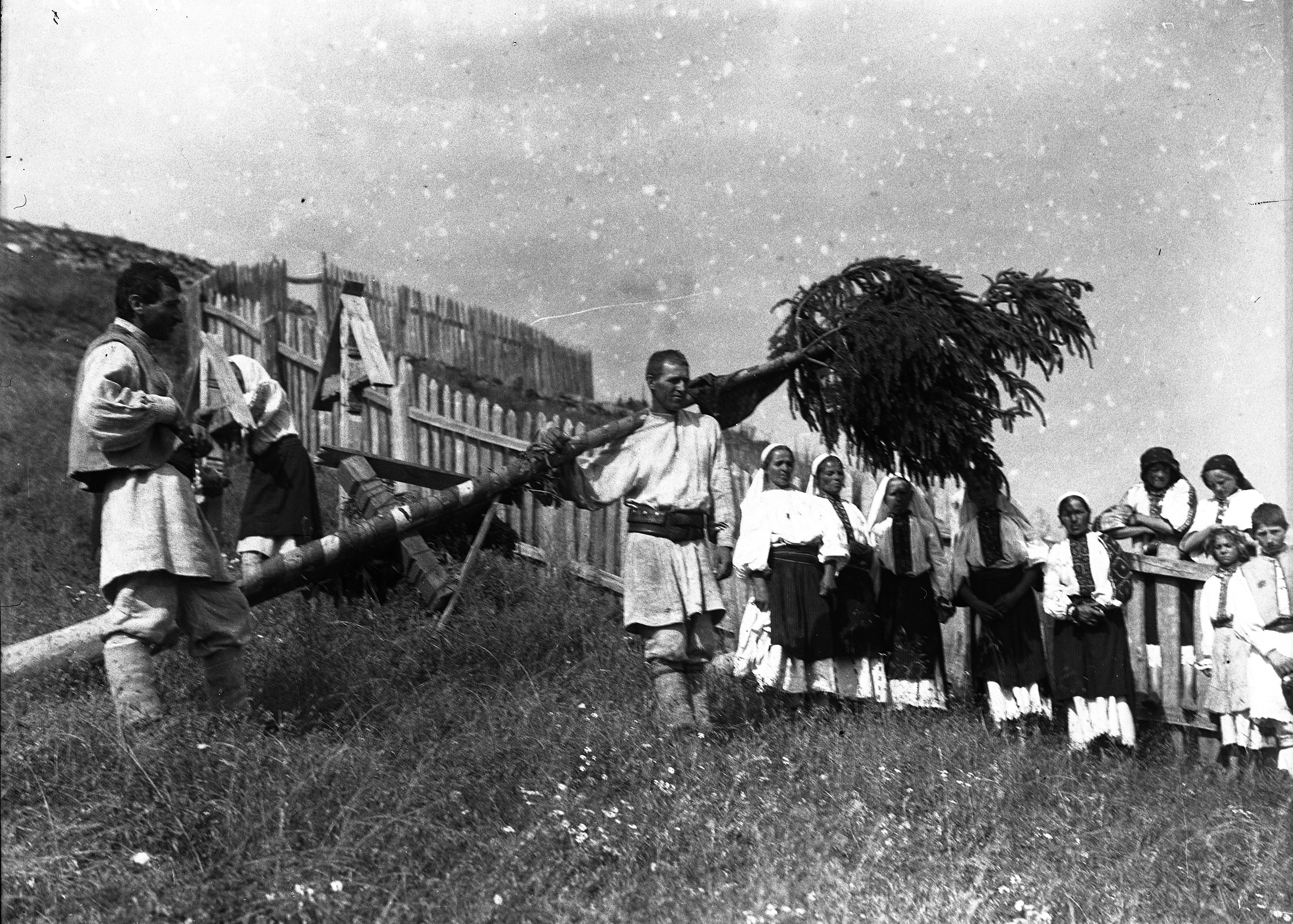
Funeral of an unmarried young man. Five performers sing the "Song of the Fir Tree" at the cemetery. Hunedoara, 1927–1930.

The texts of the "Song of the Fir Tree" are structured as a monologue of the fir tree itself: the tree recounts in the first person the stages of the rite – the search for and choice of the sacrificial fir, the ritual bowing before it, its felling, its transfer from the mountains to the village, and its installation on the grave. The end of the song describes the moment when the tree is set up: in some versions the fir is adorned with incense, bunches of basil, and flowers. In Transylvania, a painted kerchief (chischineul) is woven into the fir.

The songs of the fir combine Christian symbolism (incense, a bunch of basil, etc.) with archaic pre-Christian beliefs rooted in rural communities: the tree may be called zână la fântână ("fairy at the well"), linking it with the "old fairy" (zână bătrână), a figure who in funeral songs "sanctions" the deceased's final passage by inscribing his or her name in the "list of the dead".

=== Ceremonial songs ===
- YouTube_social_white_circle_(2017) Ceremonial songs
- De petrecut, (Banat, 1957)
- Cântare de petrecere veche – Maria Tărfăloagă & Maria Mojnean, (Oltenia, 1937)
- Pe drum spre cimitir – Persida & Brândușa Popovici, (Banat, 1937)
- Vămurile – Polina Popescu, (Gorj, Oltenia, 1940)

Besides the "Dawns" and the "Song of the Fir Tree", the corpus includes a series of other songs for the dead tied to specific moments of the ceremony. Brăiloiu grouped them together as a third category – "various songs connected with certain moments or certain acts of the funeral ceremonial" – and within it singled out the "journey songs" as the most important. Kahane's classification distinguishes this material more finely, treating farewell songs, earth songs, and burial songs as separate categories; the "journey songs" (Cântecul cel mare), however, are included by her within Zorile as an extended subtype.

The most elaborate part of this repertory consists of songs known as Cântecul cel mare ("the great song") or Ale drumului ("[song] of the road" or "journey [song]"). These songs instruct the deceased step by step how to travel the "great road": they indicate the correct path, warn of dangers and encounters, teach how to recognize helpers and animal guides, and finally how to enter the community of the other world. The chorus teaches the deceased to choose the "right", "clean" road and reject the "left", "crooked" one – an image system of archaic pre-Christian character, unrelated to ideas of salvation and damnation. One of the key motifs is the passage through the aerial toll houses (vămile văzduhului): an image from the Greco-Byzantine hagiographic tradition deriving from the Life of Basil the Younger (10th century, Constantinople). On its way to the other world, the soul undergoes a series of tests in which fallen angels judge its deeds; the song prescribes the "payment" to the guardians at each stage and lists symbolic gifts taken from funeral practice – a black covering, a shroud, and flowers. The animal guides who help the deceased overcome obstacles are the otter and the wolf, both recurring figures in Romanian folklore.

Farewell songs (Plecarea) accompany the carrying out of the coffin from the house and the procession to the cemetery. The texts are usually short and lyrical – Kahane notes among them variants of high poetic value. The cycle concludes with the "Song of the Earth" (Cântecul pământului, Țărini) and burial songs. The "Song of the Earth" is sung at the moment of the fir tree's final installation in the grave, continuing the "Song of the Fir Tree" without interruption: the text addresses the earth, personifying it, asks it to receive the deceased, and appeals to feelings of kinship. The "Song at the grave" (Ăl de la gropniţă) is sung at the moment of burial itself: the deceased is represented as separated from the world of the living by a wall with seven little windows through which the gifts of relatives and the light of the sun will come to him or her.

== Musical characteristics ==
Dawns

Dawns, dawns,
you sister dawns,
do not hurry,
do not rush upon us,
until the white traveler
has readied
an ovenful of bread,
another of cornbread,
nine barrels of wine,
nine of rakia,
and a fat little cow
chosen from the herd,
to set his table.

Dawns, dawns,
you sister dawns,
do not hurry,
do not rush upon us,
until the white traveler
has readied
a taper of wax
to light his way,
a length of linen,
another of cloth,
to dress him proper.

Dawns, dawns,
you sister dawns,
do not hurry,
do not rush upon us,
until the white traveller
has readied
a wagon to carry him,
two oxen to pull it,
for he is traveling
from one world to another,
from one country to another,
from the country of longing
to the country without longing,
from the country of mercy
to the country without mercy.

Dawns, dawns,
you sister dawns,
do not hurry,
do not rush upon us,
until the white traveller
has readied
nine little letters,
burned at the corners,
to send ahead
to all his kin,
so they may come too
and see what sorrow this is.

Zorilor, zorilor,
voi surorilor,
voi să nu pripiţi
să ne năvăliţi,
până şi-o găti
dalbul de pribeag
un cuptor de pâine,
altul de mălai,
nouă buţi de vin,
nouă de rachiu
şi-o văcuţă grasă
din ciread-aleasă,
să-i fie de masă.

Zorilor, zorilor,
voi surorilor,
voi să nu pripiţi
să ne năvăliţi,
până şi-o găti
dalbul de pribeag
turtiţă de ceară,
fie-i de vedeală,
văluşel de pânză,
altul de peşchire,
fie-i de gătire.

Zorilor, zorilor,
voi surorilor,
voi să nu pripiţi
să ne năvăliţi,
până şi-o găti
dalbul de pribeag
un car cărător,
doi boi trăgători,
că ă călător
dintr-o lume-ntr-alta,
dintr-o ţară-ntr-alta,
din ţara cu dor
în cea fără dor,
din ţara cu milă
în cea fără milă.

Zorilor, zorilor,
voi surorilor,
voi să nu pripiţi
să ne năvăliţi,
până şi-o găti
dalbul de pribeag
nouă răvăşele,
arse-n cornurele,
ca să le trimeată
pe la nemurele,
să vină şi ele,
să vadă ce jele.

— Brăiloiu, 1936

The "Dawns" and the "Song of the Fir Tree" differ markedly in musical structure from improvised lamentations, or bocets. These are group vocal songs – often with very long texts – existing in numerous melodic versions: in different regions, the same song lives in dozens of variants, and the norm defines only the range of acceptable tunes. In their intonational vocabulary and melodic organization, these songs combine features of different genres of Romanian tradition – doina, the long song, dance melodies, and colinde.

The monograph by Kahane and Georgescu-Stǎnculeanu (1988) was the first attempt to systematize this repertory from a musical point of view. The authors based their classification not on the themes of the texts but on melodic structure. The point of departure is the pitch system – that is, on which scale degrees the tune is built: melodies are divided into two main classes, tetratonic and pentatonic, within which five groups, 28 types, and 48 subtypes are distinguished. One characteristic feature of these melodies is the mobility of endings: the same tune may end on different supporting tones, and in group singing different participants often sing it simultaneously with different endings. The territorial distribution of the types is recorded separately, making it possible to trace where particular performance traditions existed and how they relate to one another.

=== Mode and scale ===
The melodic structure is based on pitch collections with four or five stable degrees – tetratony and pentatony, more rarely tritony. For understanding these melodies, what matters more than "which scale" is the system of gravitation: which tones function as supports and where the melody tends in its motion and cadences. In many variants the tune is built not on the full set of degrees but only on part of it – on separate fragments of the pitch collection – and different traditions vary in which degrees are most significant. The range fluctuates considerably depending on local style and performance situation; it is customary to distinguish the "basic" range of the tune as a model from the actual range, expanded or narrowed by ornamentation and by excursions into the upper register.

=== Rhythm and tempo ===
The dominant rhythmic principle is syllabic giusto (Brăiloiu's term): the melody unfolds syllable by syllable while preserving a sense of even movement. At the same time, performance remains flexible: durations alternate freely, individual syllables are lengthened or shortened, and the pulsation is slightly displaced. In a number of variants, aksak rhythm appears, introducing uneven beat division. At the ends of lines and at points of semantic break (caesura) the singers often lengthen the final or penultimate syllable and make a pause – such elongations create the effect of a "suspended" ending. Tempo varies widely: both very slow, drawn-out performances and more mobile ones are found; the differences are usually tied to local tradition and performance setting.

=== Form and manner of performance ===
Strophic form is generally stable but flexible. Most often the stanza consists of two or four lines, but singers may rearrange the lines, merge them, or add new ones; in some songs the stanza changes shape from beginning to end. Within each line, the middle section is the most stable and best preserves the recognizable contour of the tune – the beginning allows greater freedom, while the ending is subject to the cadence (the final syllables of the line usually come to a supporting tone, creating a sense of closure).

Typical of the "Dawns" and the "Song of the Fir Tree" is group performance with a leading voice: the soloist begins the line or stanza, then the group joins in. In Banat, antiphonal singing occurs, with two groups answering one another in alternation; the structure of some melodies preserves traces of the broader former spread of this manner. In choral performance, participants often sing the same tune with slight divergences of pitch, ornamentation, and rhythm, creating an effect of heterophony; in some cases they simultaneously sing different patterns of the same tune, a phenomenon for which Kahane uses the term "heteromorphy". Vocal style is characterized by fine vibrato, microtonal fluctuations of pitch, and smooth transitions within the sound, making intonation mobile and alive. The songs are sung in a full voice so as to be heard far across the village: where ethnomusicologists use the verb "to sing" (a cânta), the performers themselves often say "to shout" (a striga).

== Research history ==
The first publications of texts of the "Dawns" were made in the second half of the 19th century by the folklorists Ion Becineagă (1875) and Simeon Mangiuca (1882). Both versions were compiled by combining several original texts obtained from different performers.

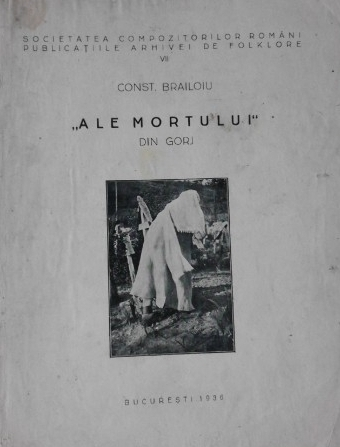
Cover of the 1936 edition Ale mortului din Gorj

Constantin Brăiloiu published in 1936 a small selection of 13 texts under the title "Ale mortului" din Gorj ("[Songs] to the Dead from Gorj"). The material had been recorded in 1930 in the commune of Runcu, at the foot of the Carpathian Mountains (Gorj County, Oltenia), during the large-scale field research of the Bucharest sociological school of Dimitrie Gusti and Henry H. Stahl. The booklet was originally conceived as a preliminary publication for a future critical edition of the funeral repertory of northern Oltenia, which Brăiloiu, however, did not live to complete. In his short introductory text, Brăiloiu limited himself to clarifying the typological distinction between songs for the dead and funeral laments (bocets), which differ in textual content, melodic structure, and occasion of performance. He also made the first observations on the classification of songs for the dead.

In postwar anthropology, Romanian funeral traditions occupied a significant place in Ernesto de Martino's Morte e pianto rituale ("Death and ritual lament", 1958). In his interpretation, Romanian material is important not merely as "folkloric documents" but as a key to reconstructing deeper layers of European culture. The well-preserved religious and ceremonial wholeness of the rite in a number of conservative rural regions made it possible to trace a movement from contemporary practices in southern Italy toward the "ancient world" – and ultimately to Archaic Greece and pre-Christian beliefs. This research context also determined the choice of specific ethnographic material: among records concerning the funeral of the shepherd Lazzaro Boia, de Martino mentions a variant of a "song for the dead" of the same type as that recorded by Brăiloiu – the "song of the tree" (Italian: canto dell'abete, cf. cântecul bradului), performed during the procession and carrying of the tree to the grave. De Martino describes such material as evidence of a profound, extremely archaic layer of culture, with a "mythical" and "pagan" resonance.

In studying the archaic formal features of the "Song of the Dawns" and the "Song of the Fir Tree", their mythological and pre-Christian elements of content, and their distribution, the ethnomusicologist Ovidiu Bîrlea showed in 1959 that this genre already existed in the pre-feudal period, before the formation of the modern ethno-folkloric and dialect zones in Romania, thus assigning them, together with the colinde, to the oldest stratum of Romanian folklore.

In 1988, Mariana Kahane and Lucilia Georgescu-Stǎnculeanu published the monograph Cântecul zorilor şi al bradului. Tipologie muzicală ("The Song of the Dawns and the Fir Tree: Musical typology"), the first systematic musical typology of this repertory. The authors worked with a corpus of 514 pieces collected before 1970 in the archives of the Constantin Brăiloiu Institute of Ethnography and Folklore in Bucharest and Cluj-Napoca; by breaking each song down into its constituent melodic strophes, they obtained more than 3,500 units for analysis. On this basis they constructed a multilevel typology encompassing the functional-thematic, typological, and territorial diversity of the repertory and giving priority to the melodic principle over the poetic one. The edition includes a corpus of poetic texts and melodic transcriptions, as well as a catalogue of archival recordings.

The Romanian-Italian scholar Dan Octavian Cepraga, in a 2015 study, treats Romanian ritual funeral songs as one of the most coherent zones of European folk culture, in which the long-term preservation of pre-Christian – or only weakly Christianized–beliefs can be particularly clearly traced. These songs dramatize the deceased's "great journey" to the other world and thus provide an extended picture of the traditional mythology of death and the afterlife. Cepraga links their persistence in rural communities until recent times to the fact that they were embedded in a coherent complex of beliefs and practices. He notes that the songs coexisted with the official Christian liturgy in the form of pagan-Christian syncretism, sustained by the tolerance and rural character of the national Orthodox tradition.

== In culture ==
Song of the Fir Tree
(fragment)

– Little fir, little fir,
who gave you the order
to come down from the stony ground
to the marshy ground,
from the place of rock
to the place of water?

– He gave me the order,
he who went wandering,
for he had need of me —
in summer for shade,
in winter for shelter.
He sent to me
two young men from the village,
their hair let loose,
their heads bound up,
dew on their faces,
mist on their arms,
axes at their belts,
wheat loaves with them,
hatchets in hand,
a month's worth of provisions.
If I had known,
I would never have sprung up.
If I had known,
I would never have grown.
...

– Bradule, bradule,
cin' ţi-a poruncit,
de mi-ai coborît
de la loc pietros
la loc mlăştinos,
de la loc cu piatră
aicea la apă?

– Mi' mi-a poruncit
cine-a pribegit,
că i-am trebuit,
vara de umbrit,
iarna de scutit.
La mine-a mânat
doi voinici din sat
cu părul lăsat,
cu capul legat,
cu roua pe faţă,
cu ceaţa pe braţe,
cu berde la brâu,
cu colaci de grâu,
cu securi pe mână,
merinde de o lună.
Eu dacă ştiam,
nu mai răsăream,
eu de-aş fi ştiut,
n-aşi mai fi crescut.
...

— Brăiloiu, 1936

Songs for the dead found a wide resonance in European culture after the appearance of a French translation on the eve of the war. Brăiloiu's 1936 collection was translated into French under the title Chants du mort ("Songs to the dead") by the Romanian avant-garde poet Ilarie Voronca and the French art historian Jacques Lassaigne, and published in the journal Mesures in 1939. The French text spread quickly through artistic circles. Commenting on a new edition published in 2018 by the Swiss press La Baconnière, the poet and literary critic Frédéric Dieu recalled that Eugène Ionesco read the songs on Radio Marseille on 21 July 1943, and that Constantin Brâncuși shared them with his friends – Marcel Duchamp, Man Ray, and Erik Satie – at private gatherings. Albert Camus published the "Songs to the dead" in the "Poésie et théâtre" series (1947), which he edited for the publisher Edmond Charlot, and Roger Caillois included individual songs in his anthology of world poetry.

The French translation in turn gave rise to versions in other languages. On 23 February 1946, the Italian poet Franco Fortini published two songs in Italian in the journal Il Politecnico under the title Consigli al morto ("Advice to the dead"); they soon entered his debut collection Foglio di via (1946). A partial Hungarian translation was made in 1947 by the writer and translator Komjáthy István.

Into English, songs from "Songs for the Dead" were translated in 1984 by the folk singer and folklorist A. L. Lloyd under the title Songs "To the dead" from Gorj for the English edition of Brăiloiu's collected writings. In 2005, Dan Octavian Cepraga published a translation of the book into Italian.

Songs for the dead were also reflected in the poetry of Paul Celan. Celan grew up in Chernivtsi, wrote in German and Romanian, and knew the tradition of Romanian oral poetry well. In 1947, in Bucharest, he published the poem Romanian: Tangoul Morţii – a text soon reworked into the German Todesfuge (Death fugue, 1948). According to Giovanni Rotiroti, the recurring image of dawn in Todesfuge goes back to the opening of the "Song of the Dawns", while the poem Engführung (1958) responds to that same text, rethinking its images in new ethical and aesthetic categories. In a 1965 letter to Petre Solomon, the poet himself marked this distance: "The time of folklore and metafolklore is past. I am engaged in a long struggle – for a poetry in solidarity with truth."

The French edition also inspired a musical response. In 1943, the Belgian composer Jean Absil wrote the cantata Les chants du mort (op. 55), a cycle in four parts for soprano, contralto, tenor, bass, and orchestra: Chant des aurores, Chant du sapin, Chant du chemin, and Chant de la tombe ("Song of the Dawns", "Song of the Fir Tree", "Song of the Journey", "Song of the Grave"). The structure of the cycle reproduces the typology of the ritual corpus itself. In his 1958 article on Romanian folk music, Absil singled out the "Song of the Fir Tree" as the most emotional of the four types: in it the tree laments its own fate – for it is placed not in the foundation of a house but at the head of a dead young man.

Authentic recordings of Romanian ritual songs were used in film. In Pier Paolo Pasolini's Oedipus Rex (Edipo re, 1967), the "Dawns" (Note: Performers: Persida Popovici and Brândușa Popovici (Persida Popovici and Brândușa Popovici), Măru, Caraș-Severin, Banat, 1937.) and the "Song of the Fir Tree" (Note: Performers: Cosana Pancu-Chici, Măriuța Poanta a lu Mocă, Măriuța Poanta a lu Spăriosu, Nica Poanta a lu Spăriosu (Cosana Pancu-Chici, Măriuța Poanta a lu Mocă, Măriuța Poanta a lu Spăriosu, Nica Poanta a lu Spăriosu), Cerișor, Hunedoara, Hunedoara.) are heard. Almost all the film's diegetic music – that is, music sounding "within the scene" as part of the action – consists of recordings from an anthology of Romanian traditional music issued by the Electrecord label in 1960–1962.

== Archival recordings and discography ==
Ritual funeral songs have come down to us above all in the form of field recordings and transcriptions. The principal repository is the archive of the Institute of Ethnography and Folklore in Bucharest, which contains more than 600 recordings of ritual songs. Part of Brăiloiu's collection is available online in the databases of the Museum of Ethnography of Geneva.

Ritual songs have been included in several anthologies of Romanian folk music:

- Antologia muzicii populare româneşti (1960–1962), a two-volume edition of folk melody recordings (six LP records, Electrecord). It was accompanied by booklets in Romanian, English, French, and Russian. It was reissued in 1976.
- Yougoslavie 1 (Serbie Orientale) – Les Bougies Du Paradis (1980), songs of the Serbian Vlachs issued in France (LP record, Ocora label).
- Roumanie. Musique de villages (1988), recordings of Romanian folk music made by Brăiloiu in the 1930s–1940s, with a preface by Laurent Aubert and commentary by Speranța Rădulescu (3 compact discs, VDE-Gallo Records label; the discs Olténie and Transylvanie).
- Rădăcini – Roots (1999), a compact disc of Brăiloiu's field recordings (Electrecord). It was accompanied by a booklet in Romanian.
- Cîntări din lada de zestre (2008), a compact disc of field recordings from the archive of the Institute of Ethnography and Folklore, issued jointly with Jurnalul național.

== Contemporary use ==
The Song of the Dawns
- Music documentary (TVR 2, 2008) (culturalia.ro, in Romanian)
- Județul Mehedinți. Cântecul zorilor

In the second half of the 20th century, songs for the dead were actively performed in Romanian rural communities as part of the funeral rite. Field research from the early 21st century still records the tradition as alive, but in the process of decline. The folklorist Cornel Boteanu, who collected "Songs of the dawn" in the commune of Ponoarele (Mehedinți County) from 1977 to 2008, documents a steady narrowing of the repertory: texts are shortened, motifs become mixed together, and the number of tradition-bearers in each village has shrunk to two or three elderly women. The young do not take up the tradition – partly because of changes in the pattern of village life, partly because performing the "Song of the Dawns" at funerals has come to be perceived as something shameful. The decline of the tradition is also attested by the singers themselves: one of them told the collector that she had asked for it to be sung over her when she died, "but I do not think there will be anyone left to do it".

== See also ==
- Dirge
- Death poem
- Death wail
- Keening
- Kommós
- Lament bass
- Lithuanian laments
- Mawwal, Middle Eastern variant
- Threnody
- Oppari
