= Coronach (disambiguation) =

Coronach can refer to:

- Coronach, a Highland dirge
- Coronach, Saskatchewan
- Coronach (horse), a thoroughbred racehorse
- Coronach, a song by Franz Schubert with text by Walter Scott, see Ave Maria (Schubert)
