= Folk songs of Lithuania =

Vocal folk music in Baltic languages, preserved in Lithuania and Latvia

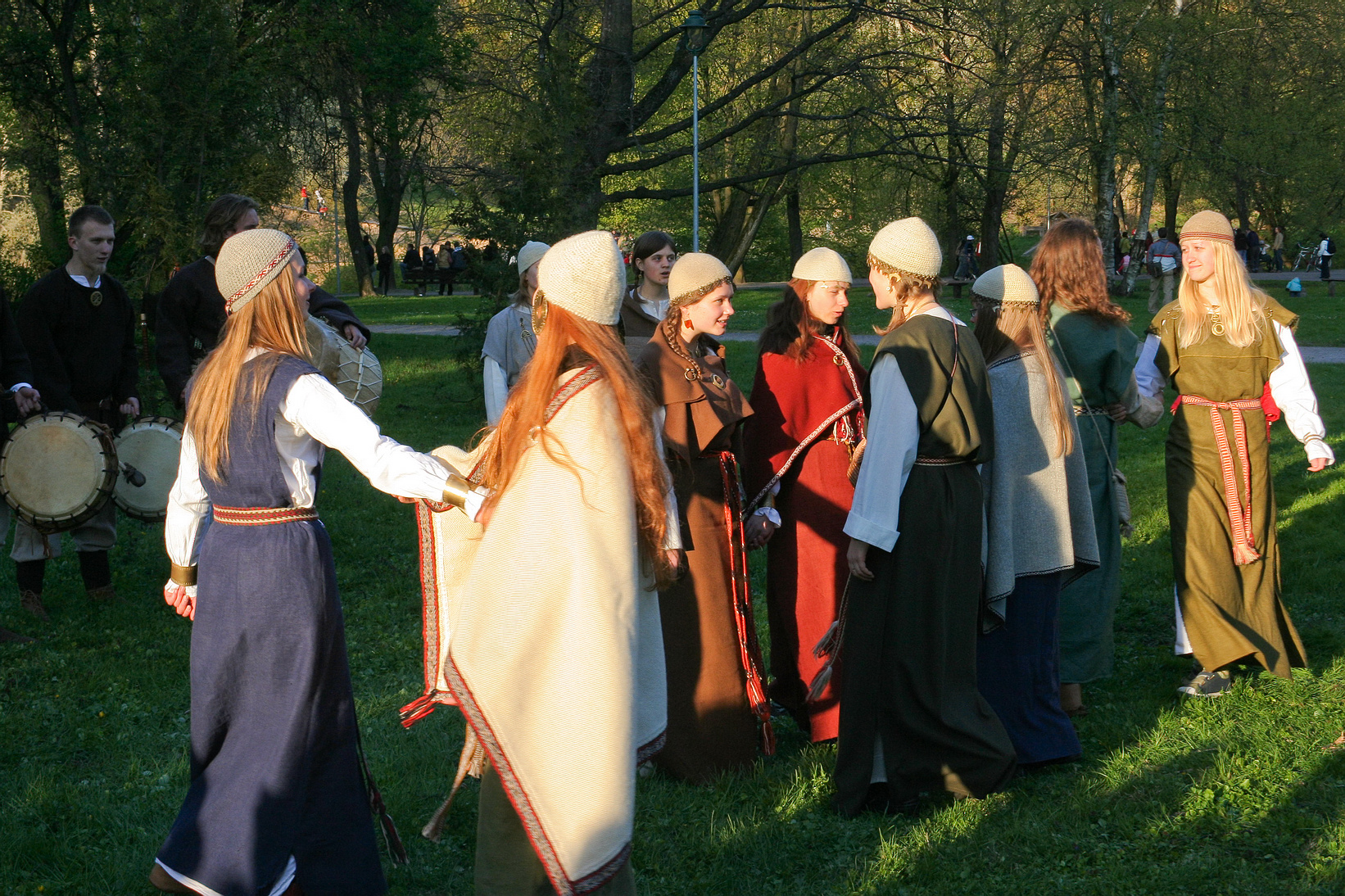
Folklore band Kūlgrinda performing traditional folk songs and dancing

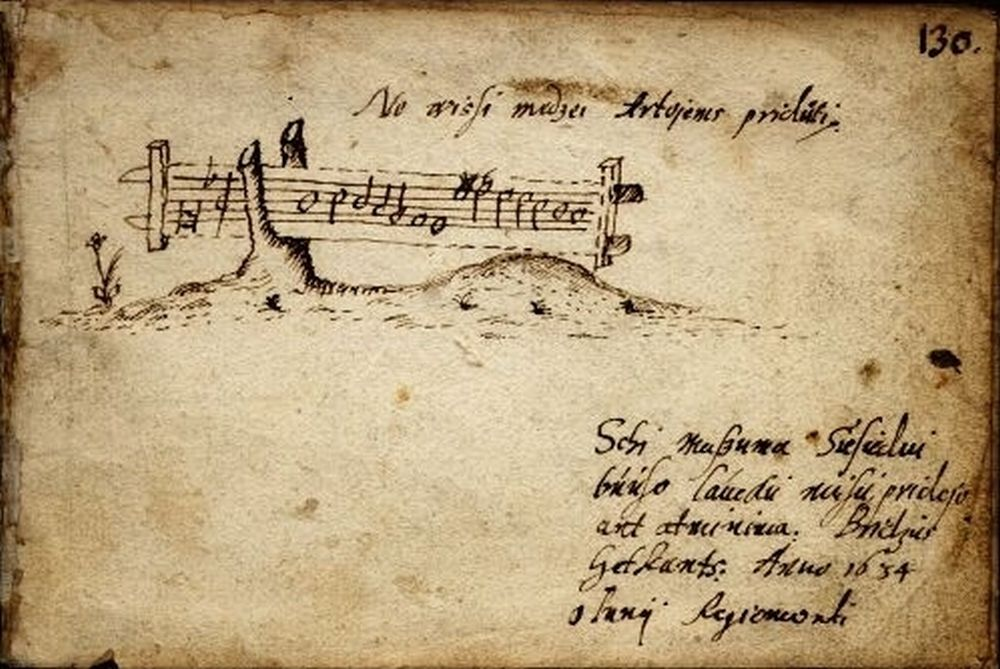
First Lithuanian song written down along with melody by Lithuanian engineer Fryderyk Getkant (Fridrichas - Bridžius Gedkantas) in 1634

Lithuanian folk songs (Lithuanian: liaudies dainos) are often noted for not only their mythological content but also their relating of historical events.

Lithuanian folk music includes romantic songs, wedding songs, as well as work songs and archaic war songs. Traditional songs are performed either solo or in groups, in unison or harmonized, primarily in thirds (tūravoti - "to harmonize"). There are three ancient styles of singing in Lithuania that are connected with ethnographical regions: monophony, multi-voiced homophony, heterophony and polyphony. Monophony mostly occurs in southern (Dzūkija), southwest (Suvalkija) and eastern (Aukštaitija) parts of Lithuania. Multi-voiced homophony is widespread in the entire Lithuania, and is most archaic in the western part (Samogitia). Polyphonic songs are common in the renowned sutartinės tradition of Aukštaitija and occur only sporadically in other regions. Many Lithuanian dainos are performed in the minor key.

Parts of Igor Stravinsky's The Rite of Spring are based on Lithuanian folk melodies, as are works by many Lithuanian composers, including Juozas Naujalis and Mikalojus Konstantinas Čiurlionis.

== Etymology ==
The word "dainos" may come from Scottish Gaelic: duan meaning "song" or Romanian: doină or Romanian: daină, meaning "folk song, often with sad music or contents."

== Song festivals ==
Lithuania is home to many folk music festivals. The "Dainų šventė" (literally Song Celebration) a state-supported festival, is perhaps the most famous. First held in 1924, it has taken place every five years since then, and helps to keep the folk and choral music tradition alive. Other major folk festivals include the Skamba skamba kankliai and the Atataria trimitai, both held annually. Of historical importance is the Ant marių krantelio, which was held in the 1980s and was the first major festival of its kind. The Baltica International Folklore Festival is held in one of the Baltic states every year.

The tradition of mass Song Festivals was inscribed in the UNESCO list of Masterpieces of the Oral and Intangible Heritage of Humanity in 2003.

== Folk song genres ==
=== Sutartinės ===
Sutartinės, singular sutartinė, (from Lithuanian sutarti 'to be in concordance, in agreement'), are multipart songs and unique examples of folk music. They are an ancient form of two and three voiced polyphony, based on the oldest principles of multi-voiced vocal music: heterophony, parallelism, canon and free imitation. Most sutartinės were recorded in the 19th and 20th centuries, but sources from the 16th century onwards show that they were significant, along with monophonic songs. Recognizing their uniqueness and value, UNESCO inscribed sutartinės into the representative list of the Masterpieces of the Oral and Intangible Heritage of Humanity in 2010.

The topics and functions of sutartinės encompass almost all known Lithuanian folk song genres, including work, calendar cycle ritual, weddings, family, wartime, and history. The melodies of sutartinės are not complex, containing two to five pitches and consisting of two equal-length parts. The rhythm of one of the two parts is typically syncopated, creating rhythmic counterpoint when sung as a round.

There are three main categories of sutartinės:

- Dvejinės ("twosomes") are sung by two singers or two groups of singers.
- Trejinės ("threesomes") are performed by three singers in strict canon.
- Keturinės ("foursomes") are sung by two pairs of singers.

Sutartinės are a localized phenomenon, found in the northeastern and eastern parts of Lithuania. They were sung by women, but men performed instrumental versions on the kanklės (Baltic psaltery), horns, and the skudučiai, a form of panpipes usually played by a group, as well as wooden trumpets (like ragai and dandytės). The rich and thematically varied poetry of the sutartinės attests to their importance in the social fabric. Sutartinės were sung at festivals, gatherings, weddings, and while performing various chores. The poetic language is not complex, but it is very visual, expressive, and sonorous. The rhythms are clear and accented. Dance sutartinės are humorous and spirited, despite the fact that the movements of the dance are quite reserved and slow. One of the most important characteristics of the sutartinės is the wide variety of lexical vocables used in the refrains (like "sodauto", "lylio", "ratilio", "tonarilio", "dauno", "kadujo" and "čiūto").

Sutartinės have almost become extinct as a genre among the general population, but the tradition is fostered by many Lithuanian folklore ensembles, who take great pleasure in keeping them alive.

=== Lithuanian laments ===
Lithuanian laments (Lithuanian: raudos; singular: rauda) are one of the oldest forms of musical poetry related to funeral customs. The first written sources about Lithuanian funeral customs date to the 9th century. Johan Maletius is purported to have written down the first lament in 1551, in a combination of the Belarusian and Lithuanian languages. The first known example of a lament solely in the Lithuanian language can be found in a travel diary by J. A. Brand. The development of laments is no different from that of other genres: emerging as part the phenomena of everyday life, they evolved and endured until they vanished when circumstances changed. In the 19th and 20th centuries, laments grew to resemble songs.

Two types of laments can be found throughout most of Lithuania. Laidotuvių raudos (funeral laments) are musical forms sung at funerals. Vestuvių raudos (wedding laments) are sung by the bride at her wedding.

Many laments reflect the ancient Lithuanian world outlook, and a unique perspective on the afterlife. Laments often depict the world of the souls, where loved ones abide. The anthropomorphizing of trees is another ancient belief found in the texts of laments.

Laments are highly improvisatory, yet the improvisations remain within the bounds of established tradition and poetics. "Professional" lamenters, hired to sing at funerals, displayed great skill in impelling their listeners to tears. Their lamentations were performed for pay: cloth, gloves, bacon, a meal or the like. Young women preparing for marriage would go to them for tutelage.

Lamenting at funerals can still be heard in eastern and southern Lithuania, where this tradition has been particularly strong.

=== Wedding songs ===
There is considerable material available about Lithuanian wedding customs. The first written sources are from the 16th and 17th centuries. The greatest amount of material can be found in 19th century academic periodicals and other publications on ethnography and folklore. A classic tome on the subject is Antanas Juška's comprehensive description of wedding rites, Svodbinė rėda. Weddings were major celebrations, lasting a week or longer, attended by the relatives and friends of both families, and including the entire village. The great variety of wedding customs gave rise to a wide array of folk poetry and musical forms. Different vocal and instrumental forms developed, such as lyrical, satirical, drinking and banqueting songs, musical dialogues, wedding laments, games, dances and marches.

From an artistic standpoint, the lyric songs are the most interesting. They reflect the entirety of the bride's life: her touching farewells to loved ones as she departs for the wedding ceremony or her husband's home, premonitions about the future, age-old questions about relationships between the mother-in-law and daughter-in-law, and the innermost thoughts and emotions of the would-be bride. The rich repertoire of prenuptial lyric love songs is also often ascribed to the category of wedding songs, since the lyrics often have to do with upcoming weddings. During the actual wedding, the lyric songs were sung by the women and girls in chorus, often in the name of the bride. The bride herself usually did not sing.

Humorous-satirical wedding songs often poke fun at "the foreign party"—the groom and his groomsmen, brothers, friends and relatives. The wittiest and most biting humor is reserved for the svotas and svočia, who are invited by the bride and groom to be the hosts or masters of ceremony at the wedding. These are usually sung by girls and women who don't play any other role in the wedding. The melodic style varies from region to region, depending on the area's traditions. In Dzūkija, for example, the songs mocking the groom and his party take on the tonal characteristics of laments and lullabies, which augment the intended effect.

Traditional drinking and banqueting songs often sing of the hops, which cause trouble by making the barrels burst at the seams. These songs are also related to various wedding rituals. Melodically, they are similar to other songs in the wedding repertoire, and they are often lyrical in nature.

The bride's verkavimai (from Lithuanian verkti 'to weep or sob') were an important part of the wedding ritual. They could be heard throughout the wedding celebration up until the bride's departure for the husband's home. Once she arrived there, her weeping was to cease. Verkavimai were free improvisations, although the imagery was quite standardized and did not vary. As young girls prepared for marriage, they tried to commit the texts of these laments to memory by learning them from their mothers or "professional" village lamenters.

=== War-historical time songs ===
Chronicles and historical documents of the 13th through 16th centuries contain the first sources about songs relating the heroics of those fallen in battle against the Teutonic Knights. Beginning in the 16th century, historical documents also provide fragments of historical songs and more detailed accounts of their origins. Later, during the 17th and 18th centuries, attention to historical songs was quite scant. Interest was rekindled during the 19th century when historians resumed their interest in the Lithuanian history. Wartime historical songs were once again written down and discussed. The most valuable sources of wartime historical songs are the folk song collections of 19th-century ethnographers, such as Antanas Juška, Simonas Daukantas, Jonas Basanavičius, Georg Heinrich Ferdinand Nesselmann, Chr. Bartsch and others.

Numerous song variant texts found in publications and archives reference events of the early 17th century. Many mention the Swedes, and there are frequent references to Riga and the Battle of Kircholm (Salaspils in Latvia). Songs collected in the first half of the 19th century mention battles with the Tatars.

There are numerous wartime historical songs in the song collections of Lithuania Minor, although these are of relatively late origin. Earlier songs from this region sing of the Seven Years' War (1756–1763), such as seeing off a soldier to battle (in Austria, Bohemia or Silesia), farewells to loved ones, and gruesome battle scenes, all in traditional poetic imagery. Historical events from the Napoleonic Wars are depicted quite accurately.

The early-20th-century war between Russia and Japan did not inspire a large repertoire of wartime historical songs. However, the events of World War I, especially the four-year occupation by the German Empire, were much more widely remembered in song. Songs from uprisings and revolutions, as well as partisan and banishment songs are also classified as wartime historical songs.

Many wartime historical songs were written down without their melodies, and the melodies that are known do not have stylistic characteristics singular to the genre. In general, the character of these songs is not march-like, but more lyric or epic. In time, many wartime historical songs became war ballads, a unique genre which is alive and well to this day.

=== Calendar cycle and ritual songs ===
The oldest Lithuanian folk songs are those that accompany the celebrations and rituals of the calendar cycle. They were sung at prescribed times of the year while performing the appropriate rituals. These songs can be classified into several categories: songs of winter celebrations and rituals, i.e. Advent, Christmas and the New Year; songs of Shrovetide and Lent, songs of spring and summer, i.e. Easter swinging songs, and Easter songs called lalavimai; and songs for the feasts of St. George, St. John, St. Peter and Pentecost. Many rituals and some ritual songs reflect ancient Lithuanian animistic beliefs in which elements of nature, such as the Sun, thunder, the Moon, Earth, fire and other natural objects were worshiped and endowed with spiritual characteristics. The rituals and songs also reflect remnants of plant and death cults.

==== Winter festivals and songs ====
The most important winter festivals commenced when the farm chores had been completed—from November through the middle of January. In order to ensure a plentiful harvest for the next year, certain rituals, representing fortune and plenty, were performed. The most important winter festival is Christmas. The four-week period of Advent preceding Christmas is a time of staidness and reflection, and the rituals and songs of Advent and Christmas reflect that mood. Songs can be identified by their refrains. Christmas songs, for example, contain vocables such as "kalėda", "lėliu kalėda" and "oi kalėda kalėdzieka" , while Advent songs contain vocables such as "leliumoj", "aleliuma", "aleliuma rūta", "aleliuma loda" and others. There are certain melodic differences as well. Songs of Advent and Christmas are the most long-lived in Lithuania and are still sung today in the southeastern area of Dzūkija.

Christmas songs are usually thematically related to upcoming weddings, relationships between young people and family members. Songs are rich in associations and parallelisms — human relationships are portrayed through images of birds and plants. This parallel imagery creates a branch-like structure in these songs. There are several typical melodic characteristics associated with Christmas ritual songs, such as a narrow range, three-measure phrases, dance rhythms, a controlled slow tempo, and a tonal structure based on phrygian, mixolydian or aeolian tetrachords.

Shrove Tuesday songs are quite unique. They depict the most important moments of the Shrovetide ritual: the battle of Spring with a Winter unwilling to yield, boisterous banquets, and abundant and satiated Nature in anticipation of an abundant year. Movement, such as riding sleighs through the fields, often accompanies them to evoke a good harvest. The songs are usually performed in a unique "shouting" singing style. Shrovetide songs have survived only in the eastern part of Lithuania, in the regions of Švenčionys, Adutiškis and environs. Since riding to and fro was such an important Shrove Tuesday ritual, it is distinctly reflected in the songs. Reference is made to horses, steeds, riding through fields. There are also some ballad-like songs, such as the one about the young soldier who fell off his steed. Another important Shrove Tuesday ritual was the parade of masqueraders. Special songs, such as beggar songs, accompany the parade. Most Shrovetide songs are recitative-like and their melodies contain the most archaic ritual melodic characteristics.

During the Easter celebration and spring in general, the tradition of swinging on swings was quite widespread (in some places during Shrove Tuesday as well). Swinging was thought to be have magical powers which induced everything, flax in particular, to grow more quickly. Very distinctive swinging songs have been collected in northern and eastern Lithuania, urging the listener to push the swing as high as it will go. There are also humorous swinging songs, mocking those who failed to hang a swing and those who refuse to participate. There is an entire repertoire mocking young men. The melodic rhythm of these songs is of particular importance, since it has to do with the movement of swinging. Tonally the swinging songs resemble archaic work songs.

The songs of the feast of St. George are associated with the reawakening of spring. Some of them reflect ancient beliefs in the magical power of words, such as the special incantation that would pick up the keys, unlock the earth and release the grass. In eastern Lithuania, these songs include intoned shouts, which attest to their use in rituals. The feast of St. George is traditionally related to animal husbandry. On that day, the herds are let out to pasture for the first time, accompanied by shepherding songs, which are usually classified among work songs.

The Spring feast of Pentecost is the celebration of renewal and flourishing greenery. In its traditions, there are remnants of pagan beliefs in the magical power of plants. It is also the shepherds' day of festivity, during which they adorn their herds in green wreaths and indulge in food and drink. Before and after Pentecost, tradition demanded that everyone "visit" the crops. Songs called paruginės (from Lithuanian rugiai 'rye') associated with this tradition can still be encountered in eastern Lithuania. They were sung by women, who walked through the fields in groups, "visiting" the crops. They sang of the cornflower, of the picking of hops, about relations between daughters-in-law and mothers-in-law, and in some there is reference to the actual "visiting."

Not many songs accompanying the feast of St. John are known. Those songs that have been written down make passing reference to the feast, although the rituals themselves are widely practiced to this day. One of the most widespread traditions is the visiting of fields between the feasts of St. John and St. Peter. The feast of St. John is also known as the Kupolė festival. Most of the St. John songs which have survived are found in northern Lithuania, including examples of the sutartinės. These polyphonic St. John songs are commonly called kupolinės, which include refrains and vocables such as "kupolėle kupolio", "kupolio kupolėlio" or "kupole rože". The feasts of St. John and St. Peter marked the end of the calendar festival song cycle. Songs which were sung during summer and autumn accompanied chores and belong to the genre of work songs. The exception is Vėlinės on November 2, during which the dead were commemorated. However, there are no specific songs that have been recorded relating to this day. Laments and orphans' songs are often associated with Vėlinės.

=== Work songs ===
Work songs are among the oldest forms of folklore. They came into being when rudimentary manual labor was employed. As farm implements improved and the management of labor changed, many work songs were no longer suitable for accompanying the tasks and began to disappear. Many of the songs became divorced from the specific job and became lyrical songs on the subject of work to be sung at any time. Work songs vary greatly in function and age. There are some very old examples, which have retained their direct relation with the rhythm and process of the work to be done. Later work songs sing more of a person's feelings, experiences and aspirations. The older work songs more accurately relate the various stages of the work to be done. They are categorized according to their purpose on the farm, in the home, and so on.

==== Herding songs ====
Herding songs make up a considerable portion of the repertoire of work songs. They are further categorized according to who sings them and by subject matter. Shepherd songs are sung by children, while night herding songs are sung by adults. Shepherd songs can further be categorized into hollos and signals; verkavimai, or laments to the sun, clouds or the wind; raliavimai (warbles) intended to quiet the animals; songs bemoaning the difficult lot of orphans; and children's songs about animals, beasts and birds which the shepherds would sing while resting. There are two subcategories of night herding songs: ones for tending oxen, and the others for pasturing horses.

Shepherding songs reflect tending of animals, the social situation of children, as well as references to ancient beliefs. There are humorous shepherd songs, which do not contain any biting mockery, but are good-natured gibes, with scenes from the everyday life of a shepherd. The most archaic and most closely related to the task of herding are the hollos and signals, laments and warbles.

The most primitive forms of shepherding folklore are hollos and signals, used to call and calm the animals, and for communication between the shepherds. Frequently they consist of onomatopoeia, such as "kir-ga-ga", "ralio", "ėdro ėdro", "stingo", "uzz birr", etc. Melodically, the hollos are very simple, usually consisting of short motifs composed of thirds and fourths.

The recitative-like melodies of shepherds' verkavimai are akin to funeral laments. The shepherds bewail their fate and ask mother Sun to warm them, or the clouds to move on.

The raliavimai or warbles are also recitative type melodies, distinguished by the vocable "ralio", which is meant to calm the animals. The raliavimai have no set poetic or musical form. They are free recitatives, unified by their refrains. Some warbles end in a prolonged ululation, based on a major or minor third.

Songs for herding oxen dealt with the job at hand. They were often sung by women, since they were the ones doing the herding. Images of young love were common; some were about reciprocal love, others about the heartbreak of a jilted girl. The melodies are lyrical.

Horse pasturing songs were sung by men, since the men were the ones who rode out at night. They are songs of love and relationships among young people. The melodies of night herding songs have certain common stylistic characteristics. Many have a galloping rhythm and tell a love story.

==== Ploughing songs ====
The cycle of fieldwork on the farm begins with ploughing. Not many of them are known to exist. They are among the most artistically interesting of Lithuanian lyrical folk songs. They describe the work itself, as well as rural life, relationships and love between young people. The melodies are not specific as the melody is not related to the movement of the work being done. However, the rhythm of the song could be coordinated with the step of the ploughman.

==== Haymaking songs ====
A great number of haymaking songs have been recorded in Lithuania. They are also subcategorized into hay mowing and raking songs. Many songs combine both topics. Hay raking songs are more melancholy than the mowing songs, and they often contain imagery about an orphan girl. Other songs describe all of the tasks associated with haymaking, beginning with the mowing and ending with the feeding of the hay to the animals. Haymaking songs often personify a clover or other beautifully blossoming flower, and often contain references to love. Young peoples' feelings are expressed through the images of the haymaking process. For example, the song "Ein bernelis per lankelę" (There goes a lad through the field) tells of a brother working in the field with a steel scythe. He plans to mow the clover and adorn his hat with it before enticing the young maiden. In contrast to these love songs, there are songs focusing on the topic of war, such as one that ruefully sings of the brother who must go off to the great war. Many songs tell off the rounding up of recruits, which shows that these songs are from the first half of the 19th century.

Refrains are common in haymaking songs. The most common vocable used is "valio", hence — raliavimai, the term for the singing of haymaking songs. The vocable is sung slowly and broadly, evoking the spacious fields and the mood of the haymaking season.

Haymaking songs evidence two distinct stages in their melodic development. The melodies of earlier origin are similar to other early work songs, especially rye harvesting songs, which take a central position in the work song repertoire. Later haymaking songs have a wider modal range and are structurally more complex. Most are in major and are homophonic. However, both types of songs contain the vocable "valio" — in the northern Highlands (Aukštaitija) as well as in Samogitia.

==== Rye harvesting songs ====
The harvesting of rye is the central stage in the agricultural cycle, and so the most abundant repertoire of work songs are related to rye. Some songs tell of the actual harvesting of rye, while others metaphorically portray a driven, running row. In some songs, the work is considered noble, while in others the difficulty of the work is stressed: the mood is doleful and sad, and love and marriage are the prevailing topics. Images of nature are very frequent, often making up an entire independent branch to a song. Family relationships between parents and children are often discussed, with special emphasis on the hard lot of the daughter-in law in a patriarchal family. The war, mythological elements and orphanages are also mentioned. In humorous songs, specific villages are mentioned, mocking the young residents, the poor harvest, the inept masters, the surly mowers, etc.

The rye harvest concluded with a celebration, which centered on the weaving of a rye wreath, called ievaras or jovaras, taking it home and presenting it to the master.

The most important element of rye harvesting songs is their unique melodic style, determined by the close connection to ritual and the function of the work. The embodiment of the style can be found in southeastern Lithuania — Dzūkija. The modal-tonal structure of some of these songs revolves around a minor third, while others are built on a major tetrachord.

==== Oat harvesting, flax and buckwheat pulling and hemp gathering songs ====
Rye harvesting songs are also closely related to other work songs: oat harvesting and pulling buckwheat and flax. These tasks had much in common and were performed by women. Shared rhythmic and tonal structures attest to their antiquity.

Some buckwheat and oat harvesting songs have distinct texts and consistent melodies; however, just as in the rye harvesting songs, some of them never mention the work being done. Oat harvesting songs sing of the lad and the maid, of love and marriage. The function of the song can be determined from the melody. Other songs do mention the work process, naming almost every step: sowing, harrowing, cultivating, reaping, binding, stacking, transporting, threshing, milling, and even eating. In addition to the monophonic oat harvesting songs of Dzūkija, there are quite a few sutartinės from northern Aukštaitija, which are directly related to the job of growing oats.

Buckwheat pulling songs, which are found only in Dzūkija, do not mention the work. The only reason we know that they are sung while pulling buckwheat is from the singers' explanations. Busy bees in the lyrics parallel young maidens busy at their weaving.

Many songs are associated with pulling flax and communal flax breaking. Flax pulling songs reflect the cycle of tasks of cultivating and harvesting the flax. Linen objects are referred to affectionately. In some songs, the images of growing and working the flax are seen through the relationship of a boy and his girl. Humorous flax pulling songs make fun of idlers.

Hemp gathering songs closely resemble flax pulling songs.

==== Milling songs ====
Milling songs are among the oldest work songs. The chronicler Alessandro Guagnini wrote of Lithuanian milling songs in the 16th century. The genre can be identified by characteristic refrains and vocables, such as "zizui malui", or "malu malu". They suggest the hum of the millstones as well as the rhythm of the milling. Milling was done by women, and the lyrics are about women's life, as well as the work itself: the millstones, the difficulty of the work, feelings of love and family relationships. Very often milling songs begin with the formula phrase, "Malu malu aš viena" (I mill, I mill all alone), followed by a text reminiscent of orphans' songs. Milling songs have no traditional melodies, but they are characteristically slow and composed, and the melodic rhythm varies little. They are closely related to their work function.

==== Spinning and weaving songs ====
Spinning and weaving songs are the most important the songs about work done in the home. The imagery of both is very similar and it is not always easy to distinguish one from the other. In spinning songs the main topic is the spinning itself, the spinner, and the spinning wheel. In some, there are humorous references to the tow or the lazy spinners who have not mastered the art of spinning and weaving by the time they are to be married. Some spinning songs are cheerful and humorous, while others resemble the milling songs which bemoan the woman's hard lot and longing for their homes and parents. These songs have characteristic melodies. There are also highly unique spinning sutartinės, typified by clear and strict rhythms. The texts describe the work process, while the refrains mimic the whirring of the spinning wheel.

The main imagery of weaving songs is the weaving process, the weaver, the loom, the delicate linens. Since the girls were usually weaving linens to fill their wedding trousseaux, the weaving process was highly poeticized.

==== Laundering songs ====
Songs which are sung while laundering and bleaching are unique, but rather infrequent. The bleaching process receives more attention than the laundering. Sometimes the refrain imitates the sounds of the beetle and mangle — laundering tools. The songs often hyperbolize images of the mother-in-law's outlandish demands, such as using the sea instead of a beetle, the sky in place of a mangle, and the treetops for drying. But, the daughter-in-law protests, she is not a fish who swims in the sea, a bird who flits among the trees, and she is not the Moon, which whirls through the sky.

==== Fishing songs ====
Fishing songs are about the sea, the bay, the fisherman, his boat and the net, and they often mention seaside place names, such as Klaipėda or Rusnė. Some songs depict the fishing process: "three fisherman are fishing in the Krokų Lanka floodplain, catching bream, the bream spawn, and the zander are leaping." The emotions of young people in love are often portrayed in ways that are unique only to fishing songs. For example, one song tells of two brothers went fishing, and caught not a pike, but a young maiden. The monophonic melodies are typical of singing traditions of the seaside regions of Lithuania.

==== Hunting songs ====
There aren't many hunting songs and not much is known about their evolution or the time and place they were to be sung. Hunting motifs are very clearly expressed — one tells of a rabbit shot in the forest, in another it is urged that the greyhounds be released to chase the rabbit, deer or sable.

==== Berry picking and mushroom gathering songs ====
These are singular songs. Berry picking songs describe young girls picking berries, meeting boys and their conversations. Mushroom gathering songs can be humorous, making light of the process of gathering and cooking the mushrooms, describing the "war" of the mushrooms or their "weddings."

== Notable researchers ==
- Liudvikas Rėza
- Jonas Basanavičius
- Mykolas Biržiška
- Norbertas Vėlius

== See also ==
- Music of Lithuania
