= Nunta mortului =

Romanian symbolic funeral wedding

Nunta mortului (Romanian for "wedding of the dead" or "wedding of the deceased"), also called a death-wedding, is a Romanian symbolic wedding incorporated into the funeral of a person who died unmarried, usually at an age when marriage was socially expected. The deceased is treated in selected parts of the ceremony as a bride or bridegroom, but the burial remains a funeral and does not bind any living participant as a spouse. Wedding clothing, a crown or veil, a ceremonial flag, unmarried attendants, a living or divine symbolic spouse, wedding vocabulary in laments, and a decorated funeral tree may appear in different local combinations.

The rite answers a death understood as occurring out of sequence within the customary progression from birth through marriage to death. In the Maramureș communities studied by Gail Kligman, the symbolic wedding completed the missing life-cycle transition, honored and pacified the soul, and guarded the living against the return of a person whose social and sexual destiny had remained unfinished. Christian imagery places the dead maiden in a union with Christ or a divine bridegroom, while a dead bachelor may be accompanied by a living surrogate bride who remains free to marry afterward. The joy, color, music, procession, kinship and commensality of an ordinary wedding are not reproduced unchanged; funeral mourning repeatedly negates and reverses them.

The custom is especially well documented in Maramureș, including Ieud, Botiza, Breb, Lăpuș and the Vișeu area, while nineteenth- and twentieth-century records of bridal burial dress and the decorated funeral fir extend through Transylvania, Bukovina, Moldavia, Wallachia, Dobruja and the Banat. Simion Florea Marian's 1892 ethnographic survey provides a major early synthesis of the clothing, tree and songs, while Kligman's 1988 monograph The Wedding of the Dead provides a book-length anthropological analysis of the rite. Later field publications recorded a Lăpuș form in 2010 and a locally maintained form at Vișeu de Mijloc in 2021.

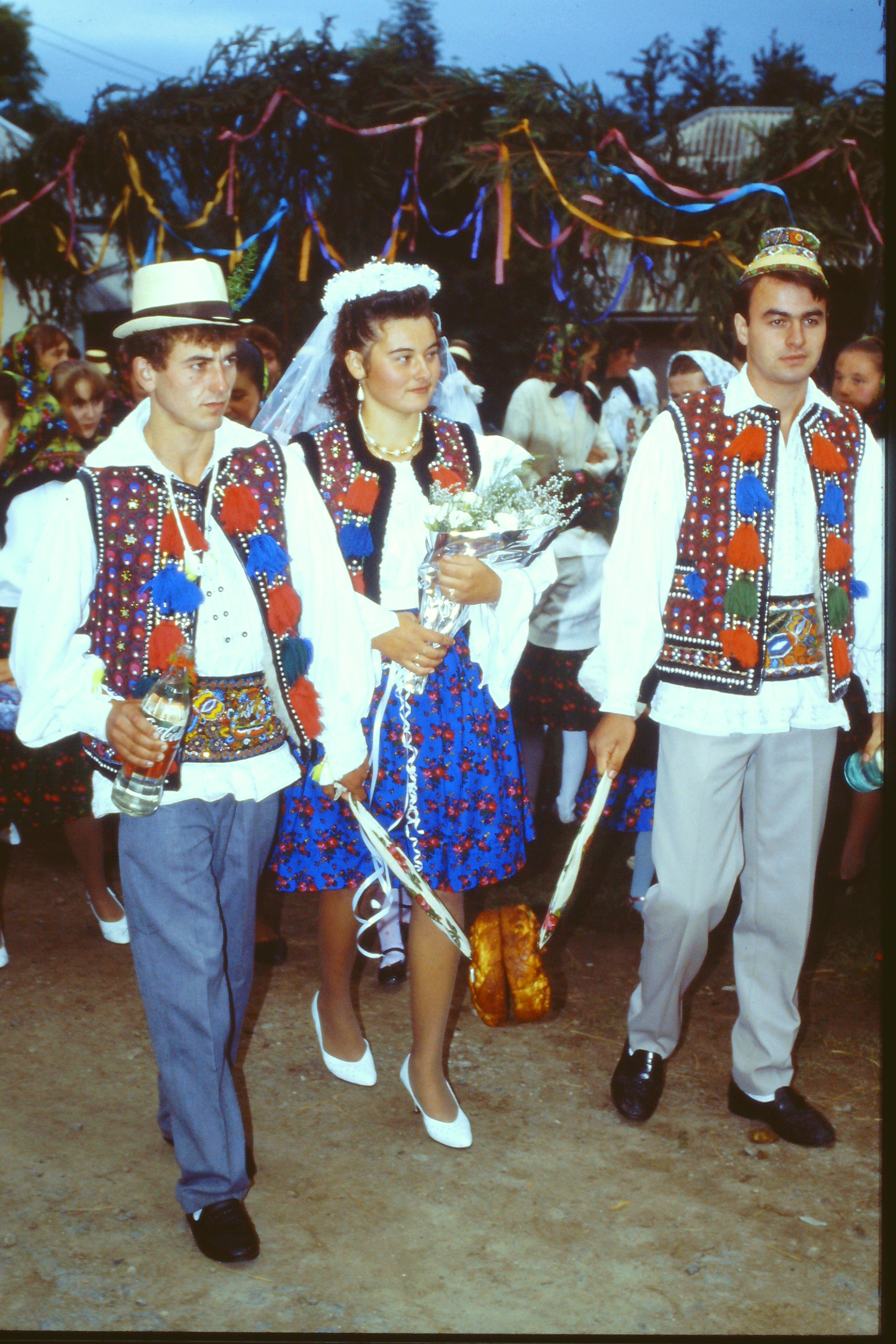
A wedding in Ocna Șugatag, Maramureș, in 1995. The death-wedding rearranges ordinary wedding signs such as special dress, crowns, attendants and procession within a funeral.

== Terminology and scope ==
Kligman translates nunta mortului as "wedding of the deceased" and uses the English compound death-wedding for the ritual complex. Romanian ethnographic writing also uses înmormântarea cu brad, "burial with a fir tree", for a closely connected form in which the unmarried dead receives a decorated tree. The two labels overlap in the historical literature, although surviving descriptions show that a fir tree was not the sole possible wedding marker and that local ceremonies selected different combinations of dress, crown, flag, spouse and attendants.

In the Maramureș speech transcribed by Kligman, mnire and mnireasă are regional forms of "bridegroom" and "bride", and lamenters apply those words directly to the deceased. The afterlife is frequently called ceia lume, "the other world", and the symbolic wedding presents the dead person's movement there through the familiar vocabulary of leaving the natal household and entering a spouse's household. Expressions such as "crowning" and "wedding" therefore operate simultaneously as ritual language, poetic metaphor and statements about the deceased's changed social status.

The death-wedding differs from a legal posthumous marriage because it does not bind a living person to the deceased. A living surrogate is not treated as a widow, and Kligman's Ieud informants explicitly regarded the surrogate bride as free to marry another man. The Orthodox priest performs the customary services for the dead, while references in laments to a priest coming to "crown" the deceased at home transform the last rites into the image of a wedding service.

== Historical documentation and distribution ==
=== Nineteenth- and early twentieth-century records ===
Marian's Înmormântarea la români, published in 1892, assembled reports attributed to numerous Romanian-speaking regions. His account states that an unmarried young man could be dressed in new or festive clothing, given a silk neckerchief, and supplied with a decorated hat or floral crown so that he appeared as a bridegroom. An unmarried young woman could be dressed in her finest clothes, have her hair arranged like a bride's, and receive flowers and a crown woven from flowers, periwinkle or ivy.

Marian recorded funeral trees in Transylvania, Bukovina, Moldavia, Wallachia, Dobruja and the Banat, with regional substitutions of apple, plum or other branches where fir was unavailable. He associated the most elaborate forms particularly with unmarried young men and women and noted that they were generally absent from funerals of older married people. His evidence includes the Hațeg area, Orlat and villages around Sibiu in Transylvania; Solca, Stulpicani, Vatra Dornei and Fundu Moldovei in Bukovina and Moldavia; a plum-tree form in Dobruja; and a form called prapor in parts of the Banat.

A 1937 lament from Vicovu de Jos in Suceava County, preserved in the documentary material later examined by Ioan Toșa and Laura Cristina Pop, sets bridal clothing, a crown and departure for a wedding against tears, bells, a coffin and the grave. The same study identifies nunta mortului or înmormântarea cu brad as a distinct symbolic wedding for unmarried young people in Romanian village practice before the middle of the twentieth century. Its source base includes replies to the ethnographic questionnaires of B. P. Hasdeu in 1877 and Ion Mușlea in 1938, linguistic and household questionnaires, and papers prepared at the Cluj University Ethnography and Folklore Seminar between 1932 and 1948.

=== Maramureș fieldwork ===
Kligman's account is based on seventeen months of anthropological fieldwork in northern Transylvania and on death-weddings she attended in Ieud, Botiza and Breb. Her detailed analysis centers on Ieud and treats weddings, funerals and death-weddings as connected parts of the village ritual cycle. The resulting 1988 monograph devotes a full chapter to the death-wedding and places it within a wider study of ritual poetry, gender, kinship, religion and social change.

Corina Isabella Csiszár's 2016 study includes a field record collected in Lăpuș in 2010 from Palaghia Pop, then aged 78. That record gives separate arrangements for a dead girl and a dead boy, identifies the crown, veil, white flag, periwinkle decoration and child flag-bearer, and reports local fears surrounding the role of a living bridesmaid or spouse. Csiszár also observed that ritual lamenting and the former games and dances of the wake had largely declined in the Maramureș localities covered by her research, although death-wedding elements persisted in isolated funerals of unmarried young people.

Vasile Pașca's 2021 study locates another form in Vișeu de Mijloc, a rural district of Vișeu de Sus. Pașca records the rite for an unmarried young man and analyzes a locally composed funeral poem in which wedding and burial are joined through contrast and symbolic inversion. These documented forms do not establish a single fixed procedure for all of Maramureș, because even neighboring accounts differ in the color of the flag, the use of a living spouse, the place of instrumental music and the handling of the crown.

== Life-cycle setting ==
Local explanations recorded by Kligman and Pașca arrange the major transitions of a person's life as birth, marriage and death. A person who died unmarried at marriageable age had reached death without completing the intervening transition, making the death "untimely" in ritual and social terms even when its biological cause was ordinary. The symbolic wedding inserted the omitted transition into the funeral while leaving the funeral's basic sequence intact.

Marriage and death already shared a sequence of formal separations and incorporations in the communities Kligman studied. Both involved special dressing, requests for forgiveness, a departure from the household, a procession, religious action, distributions of goods, a meal and a reorganization of relations with family and community. A bride left her natal family to join a husband's family, while the deceased left the living to join the dead in the other world. The death-wedding made those structural correspondences visible while the coffin, mourning clothes and cemetery continuously identified the event as a death.

The rite also addressed beliefs about unfinished obligations. Kligman's Ieud material links unresolved enmity, an unfinished love affair and the failure to marry with the possibility that the dead could return as a strigoi in search of satisfaction. The death-wedding was therefore performed both as an act of care for the soul and as a precaution intended to protect the living. Kligman distinguishes this symbolic reconciliation from violent anti-strigoi measures because the wedding gives the deceased an honored social place rather than expelling the dead as an enemy.

== Ritual sequence ==
=== Preparation and dressing ===
The basic sequence documented in Ieud remained that of a funeral: the pre-funeral service or parastas, removal of the body from the house and courtyard, the cortege, burial, distributions of alms and later commemorative meals. The wedding layer appeared through selected objects, participants, words and contrasts placed inside that sequence. The rite could begin during the preparation of the body, when the unmarried dead was dressed according to bridal or bridegroom status.

Historical reports give young men new shirts, festive outer garments, costly boots or shoes, silk scarves, rings, feathers and artificial flowers. The exact costume followed local dress and household means, so the defining feature was not one standardized outfit but the conversion of burial clothing into recognizable bridegroom attire. In Marian's Transylvanian and Bukovinian records, young women wore fine embroidered garments, new footwear, jewelry, flowers, uncovered or specially arranged hair, and crowns made with flowers, periwinkle or ivy.

Kligman's Ieud description sharpens the opposition between the dead bride's white clothing and the mourners' black dress. White continued to mark bridal status, but it did not transform the mourners into wedding guests or suspend funeral decorum. The deceased wore a wedding crown while male mourners remained bareheaded, making the signs of marriage and death visible at the same time.

=== Crown, veil and flag ===
The crown linked the dead maiden to both ordinary bridal dress and the Orthodox marriage service. In the Lăpuș field record, a dead girl received an embroidered bridal veil, called a balț, and a crown; the crown was later removed in church and left by the icons. In Kligman's Ieud material, the crown could stand by itself for the dead bride's marriage to a divine bridegroom, without a living man assigned as her husband.

The wedding flag also changed according to locality and gender. Kligman records a flag made with the black headscarves of married women instead of the brightly colored scarves associated with a living wedding. Csiszár's Lăpuș informant instead describes a white wedding flag for a dead boy, decorated with lace and periwinkle flowers and carried by a small child. Both forms identify the young man as a bridegroom, but their opposed colors prevent either one from being treated as a universal Romanian standard.

=== Surrogate spouse and attendants ===
A dead bachelor in Ieud usually received a living surrogate bride. His sweetheart could take the role, while a cousin, neighbor or another unmarried woman might volunteer when no sweetheart did so. The role honored the dead man's soul but did not constitute a binding marriage because the union was not consummated and the surrogate retained the right to marry. Kligman records one woman who served as a death-wedding bride seven weeks before her own living wedding.

Ieud practice was asymmetrical: a living bride could be "put" for a dead young man, while a living groom was not normally "put" for a dead young woman, who instead received a crown and a divine spouse. The Lăpuș record gives a different pattern, allowing a dead young woman to be accompanied to the grave by her boyfriend or fiancé dressed as a groom and a dead young man to be accompanied by a girl dressed as a bride. The same record reports fears that misfortune could befall a person who acted as bridesmaid, bride or groom for the dead. Families could reduce that perceived danger by assigning the bridesmaid's or forward-procession role to a small girl, sometimes dressed in black.

Unmarried peers served as attendants and pallbearers, combining the social cohort of a wedding party with the work of carrying the coffin. Kligman's account of a dead bride notes six girlfriends bearing her coffin, an image that lamenters contrasted with the companions who would ordinarily escort a bride to church. Unmarried friends thereby accompanied one of their cohort to burial while performing the pallbearers' role.

=== Religious service, procession and burial ===
The Orthodox priest's visit to the house remained part of the funeral rites, although laments interpreted his presence through the language of a priest coming to crown a bride or groom. The poetic image of being crowned "on the table" joins the wedding crown with the place where the coffin or body lay and does not indicate that the ordinary marriage sacrament replaced the last rites. The cemetery likewise occupies the structural position of the church destination in a wedding procession while remaining the place of burial.

The cortege displayed the contradictions that the laments verbalized. A crowned bride or bridegroom traveled in a coffin; unmarried friends became pallbearers; a wedding flag could be black; and women's cries supplied music that would ordinarily have come from instrumentalists. The procession therefore joined recognizable wedding roles without concealing the bodily finality of death.

Where a funeral fir or other tree formed part of the rite, it traveled with or ahead of the coffin and was finally fixed or buried near the head of the grave and the cross. Marian records young men carrying the tree from the forest or on their shoulders, and some Transylvanian accounts added riders and sorrowful flute music when the fir had to be fetched from far away. The tree's burial beside the deceased completed a ceremonial journey that began with its cutting and decoration.

=== Alms and commemorative meals ===
A death-wedding did not end the normal cycle of funeral alms and commemorations. Bread, food, cloth and other gifts were distributed for the soul, and the funeral meal brought mourners together after burial. Kligman interprets the meal as glorifying the deceased's soul while reaffirming relations among the living and between the living and the dead.

Wedding and funeral meals also supplied material for lament imagery. At a living wedding the couple sat behind the table and received good wishes, while a death-wedding lament placed the dead bride or groom "on" the table for crowning and later invited the deceased to return to the family table. The shift in prepositions turned a familiar scene of commensality into an acknowledgment of the coffin and the irreversible separation caused by burial.

== The funeral fir ==
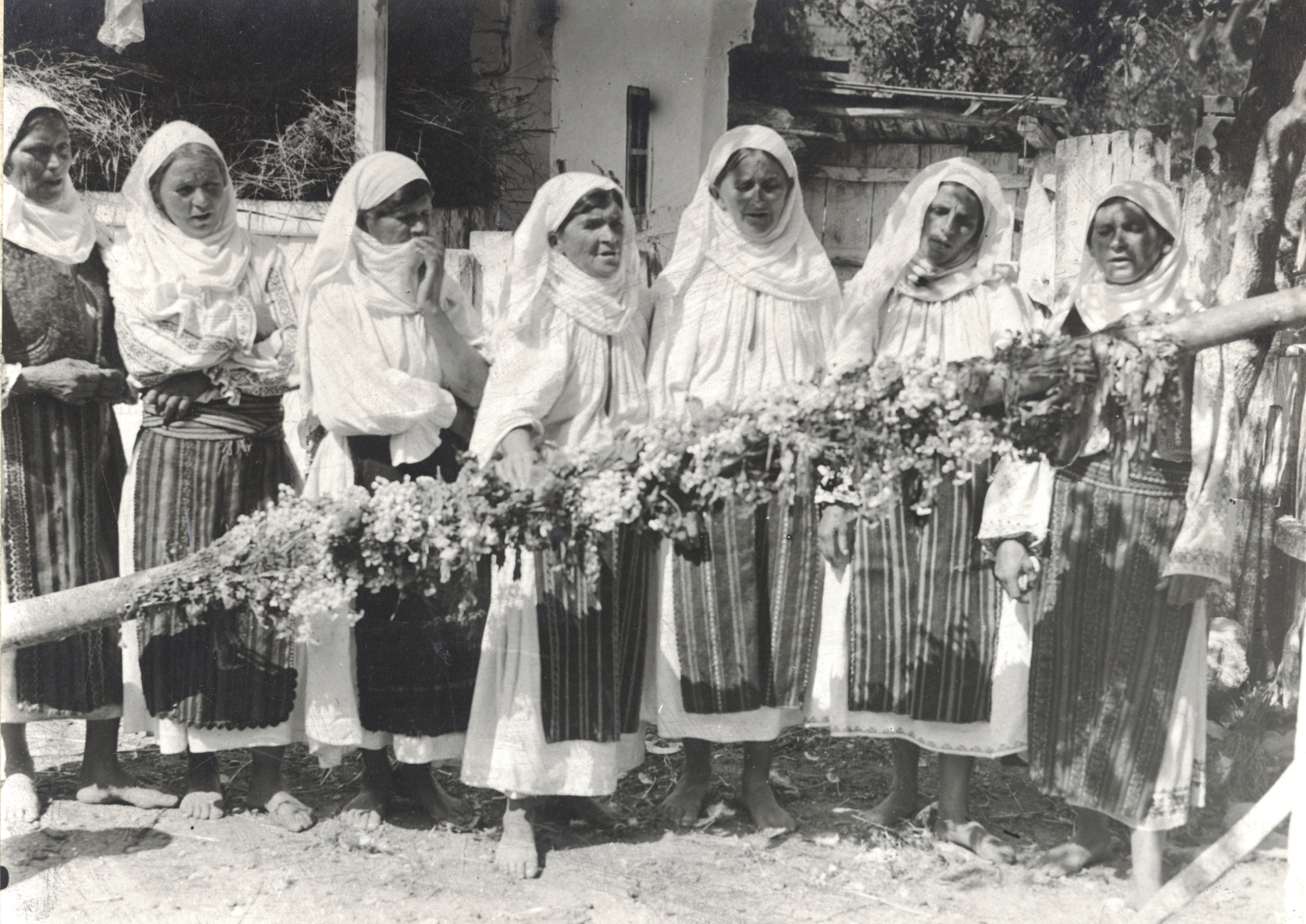
A 1930 performance of the "Song of the Fir Tree" at the funeral of Ana Sârbu in Runcu, Gorj County. Marian recorded related funeral-tree songs and processions in Transylvania, Bukovina and the Banat.

The decorated brad, usually a fir but sometimes another tree or branch, forms one of the most widely documented objects associated with the unmarried dead. Marian records flowers, wreaths, scarves, colored wool, fruit, nuts, ritual bread, a candle, rings and small purchased sweets among its possible ornaments. Local environment affected the species, with apple or plum branches substituted in districts without fir and a decorated plum tree recorded in Dobruja.

The tree could mark the house as containing a dead person, accompany the procession, and remain at the grave. In Rășinari and nearby Transylvanian villages, wool could be added when the deceased had been a shepherd, while the engagement ring of a betrothed young woman could be tied near the top. In Hațeg, the object could take the form of a tall firwood spear fixed to the grave cross, and in Orlat a carved post with a wooden dove could replace a living tree for an unmarried young man.

Toșa and Pop report that in communities where unmarried young people were buried with a fir, the tree represented the deceased's spouse in the other world. The tree was then brought by young people through a ceremony distinct from the bringing of a fir to an ordinary wedding. This explanation gives the object a nuptial identity, while Marian's broader evidence also assigns it funerary functions as a marker, procession object and companion at the grave.

The cutting and transport of the fir generated its own ceremonial poetry. Marian records riders going to distant forests with flutes, village girls greeting the returning tree with the Cântecul bradului, "Song of the Fir Tree", and women singing as young men carried it before the funeral cart in the Apuseni Mountains. The songs address the tree as a living interlocutor, recount its removal from the mountain, and pair its coming decay with that of the young person beside whose grave it will stand. In parts of the Banat, the related prapor was carried from the forest on the shoulders of unmarried young men and then taken to the grave.

== Laments, verse and music ==
Ritual lament is the principal verbal medium of the Maramureș death-wedding described by Kligman. Lamenters address the dead by personal name, kin term and the titles "bride" or "bridegroom", creating a one-sided conversation in which the deceased remains the intended listener. Mothers, sisters, cousins and other women use wedding preparations, departure and marriage as a framework for stating that death occurred at the time when life and marriage were expected.

The dominant poetic device is negative parallelism. A line or group of lines first proposes the appearance of a wedding and then cancels it with the coffin, grave, absence of musicians, grief of the family or physical decay of the body. The method preserves likeness and difference together: the dead person is dressed as a bride, yet carried by pallbearers; many people gather, yet not to celebrate; a priest comes, yet for last rites; and a procession leaves the house, yet for the cemetery.

Color and sound perform the same opposition as the poetry. White bridal dress appears against black mourning clothes, and the bright flag of a living wedding may become a black flag assembled from married women's scarves. Ieud custom excluded instrumental music from the death-wedding and gave the musical role to women's lamenting. Kligman notes that other villages admitted musicians, but required them to go bareheaded and play sorrowful music rather than a celebratory wedding repertory.

Pașca's study of the "Poem for Gheorghe Ulici", composed by the deacon Simon Ioan at Vișeu de Mijloc, documents a semi-scholarly local funeral verse performed by church singers. Its text organizes the death-wedding as an extended metaphor built from contrast and symbolic inversion. Pașca identifies the melody as a local modal type with major–minor parallelism and a range of one octave, linking the verbal structure to a recognizable regional funeral style.

The 1937 Vicovu de Jos lament preserved by Toșa and Pop uses the same contrastive grammar outside Kligman's Maramureș corpus. It turns bridal ornaments into causes of grief, replaces the human groom with a figure waiting at heaven's gate, substitutes bells and weeping for wedding musicians and shouts, and ends by identifying the grave as the destination. The correspondence between these independently collected texts supports negative parallelism as a recurrent technique without implying that every village used the same verses.

== Age, gender and exceptional cases ==
Marriageable unmarried adolescents and adults formed the usual category for the death-wedding in Kligman's field material and in the historical sources. The category depended on social status and life-cycle expectation, not on one stated numerical age. Marian accordingly distinguishes unmarried youths and maidens from older married people, while local descriptions use terms equivalent to bachelor, young man, maiden and bride.

Kligman nevertheless documents a death-wedding for a seven-year-old girl in Ieud. Children of that age were ordinarily thought to go directly to heaven because they had not entered the stage of sin, so marriageable status did not explain this case. The girl's earlier role as a bridesmaid and a local ceremonial expectation that a bridesmaid would later become a bride supplied the logic by which her funeral was interpreted as a wedding. The exception shows that sequence, biography and relations with other deaths could override the usual age boundary.

Gender shaped the choice of spouse and symbols but did not produce one uniform rule across the region. In Ieud, the dead maiden's crown and marriage to Christ contrasted with the dead bachelor's living surrogate bride. In the Lăpuș account, either a boyfriend or fiancé could accompany a dead woman as groom and a girl could accompany a dead man as bride. Both accounts assign active public roles to unmarried peers, although the fear attached to serving as a partner or bridesmaid is explicit only in the Lăpuș record.

The rite could also be performed without a body. In 1979, after a family received final confirmation that an unmarried son missing since the Second World War had died, Ieud villagers held a full death-wedding in which his hat stood on a table in place of his remains. A surrogate bride, flag-bearer and wedding-funeral entourage assembled around the substitute object so that burial and marriage obligations could be completed despite the absence of a corpse. The case extended the rite from an immediate funeral to the delayed resolution of a wartime disappearance.

== Christian imagery and relations with the dead ==
Christian nuptial imagery supplies the divine spouse in many death-wedding laments. Kligman's Ieud texts present the groom of a dead maiden as Christ, the son of God, the son of a king or a heavenly prince, and describe heaven through the image of a protected garden. The dead bride leaves her mother's garden for the divine bridegroom's garden just as a living bride leaves her natal household, while references to the locked cemetery garden simultaneously reassert burial and decay.

The symbolic theology applies differently to male and female participants. A maiden is explicitly made a bride of Christ, whereas a dead young man may be represented as marrying a divine being in verse but accompanied by a mortal surrogate in performance. Kligman connects the idiom to Christian conceptions of the soul as a bride of Christ, while her ritual account identifies the priest's action as last rites rather than an ordinary marriage service.

The wedding also functions as pomană, an offering or alms for the deceased. It supplies an uncompleted social good to the soul and incorporates the dead person into an ordered network of living relatives, ancestors and divine relations. At the same time, fear of a dissatisfied return gives the rite a protective function, especially where an unresolved love or unfulfilled marriage is thought capable of producing a strigoi. Care and fear therefore coexist within the same performance instead of defining separate ceremonies.

The ordinary funeral cycle continues that relationship through food, prayer and commemoration. Alms given in the dead person's name glorify the soul and redistribute the deceased's beneficence to mourners, clergy, gravediggers, bell-ringers, children and poorer households. Later meals and prayers replace the face-to-face address of lament once the body is no longer present. The death-wedding thus completes the missing marriage within a longer process of separating the corpse, sustaining memory and reorganizing social relations after death.

== Relationship to Miorița ==
The symbolic wedding of the dead is also central to many versions of the Romanian pastoral ballad Miorița. In the ballad, a shepherd warned that companions intend to kill him asks for burial near the sheepfold and instructs that his death be presented to his mother as a wedding. The earth or a princess becomes the bride, while the sun, moon, mountains, trees, birds and flock take the ritual places of godparents, priests, guests, musicians and mourners.

The performed funeral rite and the ballad are related symbolic forms, not interchangeable versions of one event. In the death-wedding, a particular dead person receives wedding signs during an actual burial, and the intended union is commonly with a divine spouse or a living surrogate. In Miorița, the shepherd's narrated marriage places him within a cosmic family composed of the landscape and celestial bodies.

Kligman interprets the first as a spiritual marriage between the soul and Christ and the second as a cosmic marriage between humanity and nature. Both use kinship to give an intelligible form to premature death and to keep marriage within the expected sequence of social life. Gheorghiță Geană's 2016 study likewise treats the "Mioritic wedding" as a ritual and poetic solution to a crisis produced when death precedes marriage. The scholarship therefore places the ballad beside the rite as evidence for a broader Romanian symbolic association of marriage, burial and the restoration of order.

== Interpretation ==
Kligman analyzes the death-wedding as a conjunction of categories that village ritual normally keeps distinct: living and dead, male and female, sexuality and mortality, culture and nature, white and black, celebration and mourning. The ceremony does not erase those distinctions, because every wedding likeness is countered by an unmistakable funeral fact. Its force comes from moving between analogy and opposition until the deceased can be assigned a completed life-cycle status without denying death.

From a rites-of-passage perspective, the ceremony manages separation and incorporation on two levels. The dead person separates from household and unmarried peer group through dressing, forgiveness, procession and burial, then enters the community of the dead through a symbolic marriage, alms and commemoration. The living simultaneously lose a child, sibling, friend or prospective spouse and reconstruct their relations around the deceased's new status.

The gendered form of the rite reflects the marriage system of the communities in which it was performed. A living bride's transfer from her natal family supplies the model for the dead maiden's journey to a divine groom, whereas the dead bachelor receives a surrogate who completes the public form of a couple without becoming his widow. The resulting marriage is "perfect" within the ritual language because it honors the soul without binding a living partner, creating an ordinary household or requiring a consummated union.

The fir adds an environmental and material dimension to the same process. Cut from the forest, decorated by the community, carried like a ceremonial companion and planted at the grave, it moves from living vegetation to a funerary object alongside the body. Local identification of the tree as the dead person's otherworldly spouse makes that movement explicitly nuptial, while the "Song of the Fir Tree" aligns the tree's severance and withering with human death.

== Change and continuity ==
Kligman's late twentieth-century fieldwork found death-weddings in rural Maramureș but not in late-twentieth-century Romanian urban funerals. A person who lived elsewhere could still receive the rite when buried in the natal village, making place of burial as important as place of residence. Kligman linked the practice's decline to secularization, migration, seasonal labor, consumer culture and the wider privatization of death, while presenting those forces as uneven rather than complete.

Csiszár's 2016 evidence records a related pattern of selective survival. The wake continued, but its former youth games and dances had been abandoned, and ritual lament was largely restricted to isolated cases involving young unmarried dead. The Lăpuș testimony nevertheless retained detailed knowledge of veil, crown, white flag, child flag-bearer and symbolic partner.

Pașca reported in 2021 that the Vișeu de Mijloc custom remained locally maintained in a settlement retaining a rural social setting. Its continuation included a funeral poem composed and sung within the local church-singer tradition rather than only an anonymously transmitted lament. The evidence from Kligman, Csiszár and Pașca therefore documents coexistence of persistence, contraction and formal change, not a single date at which the rite disappeared.

== Scholarly study ==
Marian's 1892 survey preserves regionally attributed descriptions from before large-scale twentieth-century social transformation. It treats burial dress, the funeral fir and the tree songs as separate parts of a wider funeral system. The survey organizes its evidence by the regional names, vocabulary and ethnographic categories used in the late nineteenth century.

Kligman's The Wedding of the Dead: Ritual, Poetics, and Popular Culture in Transylvania, published by the University of California Press in 1988, is a book-length English study centered on the ritual. It joins close description of several funerals with analysis of oral poetry, life-cycle structure, gender, Christian cosmology, kinship and socialist-era change. The Romanian translation, Nunta mortului: Ritual, poetică și cultură populară în Transilvania, appeared in 1998.

Toșa and Pop re-examined archival questionnaire material from 1850–1950 and placed the death-wedding at the conclusion of a broader history of Romanian village marriage customs. Csiszár added a named, dated field testimony from Lăpuș and documented the transformation of the surrounding funeral complex. Pașca supplied a focused textual and musical study from Vișeu de Mijloc, while Geană located the Mioritic wedding within ritual theory and the interpretation of premature death. Together, these studies move from broad historical collection to village ethnography, archival reconstruction, musicology and comparative ritual analysis.

== See also ==
- Rite of passage
- Romanian folklore
- Songs to the dead
