= Kommos =

Kommos may refer to:

- Kommos (Crete), an archeological site in Crete
- Kommos (theatre), a lyrical song of lamentation in an Athenian tragedy
