= Keening =

Vocal lament for the dead

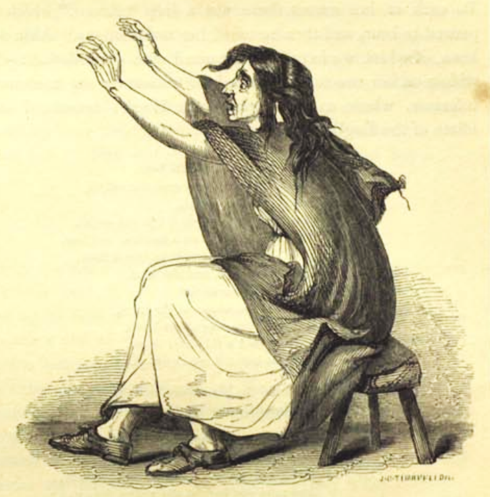
A woman keening at a wake in County Kerry in the early nineteenth century, depicted from the memories of Samuel Carter Hall. She had "black, uncombed locks" and a blue cloak, and held her hands above the body then dramatically waved them in the air "as if by sudden inspiration".

Keening (Irish: caoineadh, pronounced [ˈkiːnʲə]) is a traditional form of vocal lament for the dead in the Gaelic Celtic tradition, known to have taken place in Ireland and Scotland. Keening, which can be seen as a form of sean-nós singing, is performed in the Irish and Scottish Gaelic languages (the Scottish equivalent of keening is known as a coronach).

Keening was once an integral part of the formal Irish funeral ritual, but declined from the 18th century and became almost completely extinct by the middle of the 20th century. Only a handful of authentic keening songs were recorded from traditional singers.

== Etymology ==
"Keen" as a noun or verb comes from the Irish and Scottish Gaelic term caoineadh ("to cry, to weep"), and references to it from the 7th, 8th, and 12th centuries are extensive.

== Melody and text ==
The tune and lyrics rely on the repetition of a couple of basic motifs which can be variably extended or shortened. It seems that there was never an established keening ‘text’; the singer is expected to improvise as feeling dictates. Despite the keen varying between performances, keeners worked within the same body of motifs and diction. Keening was rhythmically free, without a metre.

The words are thought to have been constituted of stock poetic elements (the listing of the genealogy of the deceased, praise for the deceased, emphasis on the woeful condition of those left behind, etc.) set to vocal lament. Words of lament were interspersed with non-lexical vocables, that is sounds that are without meaning.

The keen can be formed of three motifs: The salutation (introduction), the dirge (verse), and the gol (cry).

== History and mythology ==
=== Historical record and performance practice ===
In the 12th century, Giraldus Cambrensis (Gerald of Wales) described vocal laments taking place in which the mourners were divided in two, each alternately singing their part and sometimes joining in full chorus. Written sources that describe the singing style appear from the sixteenth century on.

In ancient times, a chief's own bard (assisted by the chief's household) would perform the funeral song. More recently, keeners would be hired female mourners. The mourners accompanied the keening woman (bean chaointe), with physical movements involving rocking and kneeling. The Irish tradition of keening over the body during the funeral procession and at the burial site is distinct from the wake, the practice of watching over the corpse, which takes place the night before the burial, and may last for more than one night.

The practice of keening was "generally adhered to" throughout Ireland irrespective of social class until around the middle of the 18th century.

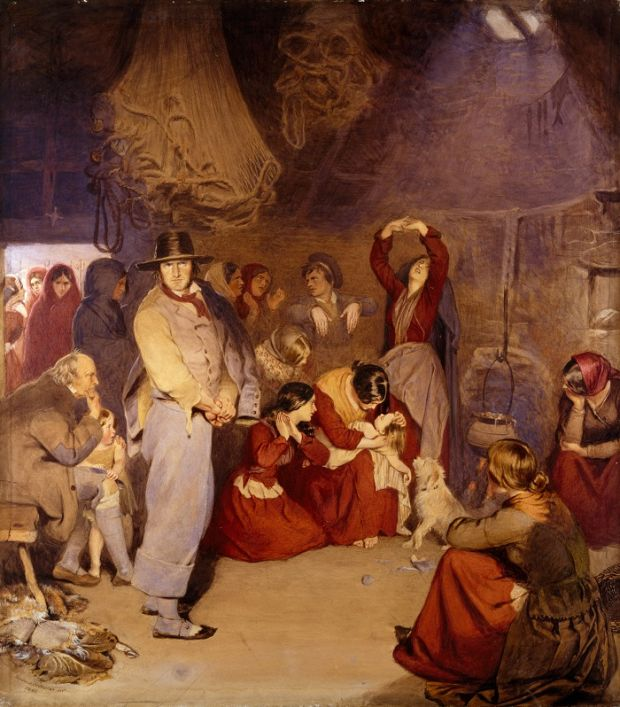
"The Aran Fisherman's Drowned Child" (1851) by the Irish painter Frederic William Burton, which appears to show paid keening women in the doorway.

Around 1791, the antiquarian William Beauford (1735–1819) described in detail the practice of keening at a traditional Irish funeral ceremony and transcribed the keening melodies that were sung. He provided the following information:

- The bards prepared the keen in advance.
- The body, "ornamented with flowers, was placed on a bier, or some elevated spot."
- The relations and keeners were arranged in two divisions, one at the head, the other at the foot of the corpse.
- "The chief bard of the head chorus began by singing the first stanza in a low doleful tone, which was softly accompanied by the harp: at the conclusion, the foot semichorus began the lamentation, or ullaloo, from the final note of the preceding stanza, in which they were answered by the head semichorus; then both united in one general chorus. The chorus of the first stanza being ended, the chief bard of the foot semichorus began the second gol, or lamentation, in which they were answered by that of the head, and as before, both united in the general full chorus."
- "The genealogy, rank, possessions, the virtues and vices of the dead were rehearsed, and a number of interrogations ‘were addressed to the deceased: as, why did he die? If married, whether his wife was faithful to him, his sons dutiful, or good hunters or warriors? if a woman, whether her daughters were fair or chaste? If a young man, whether he had been crossed in love? or if the blue-eyed maids of Erin had treated him with scorn?"

Samuel Carter Hall described Irish funeral traditions and keening songs in his 1841 book Ireland: Its Scenery, Character and History. He wrote that mourners would often rock back and forth and clasp their hands together during the keening song.

=== Parallels elsewhere ===
Wailing and singing in lamentation, is as old as funerals, going back to Homeric, Etruscan, and biblical times. Keening has strong parallels in the Middle East and elsewhere. Sir Walter Scott compared Gaelic keening to the ululatus of the Romans.

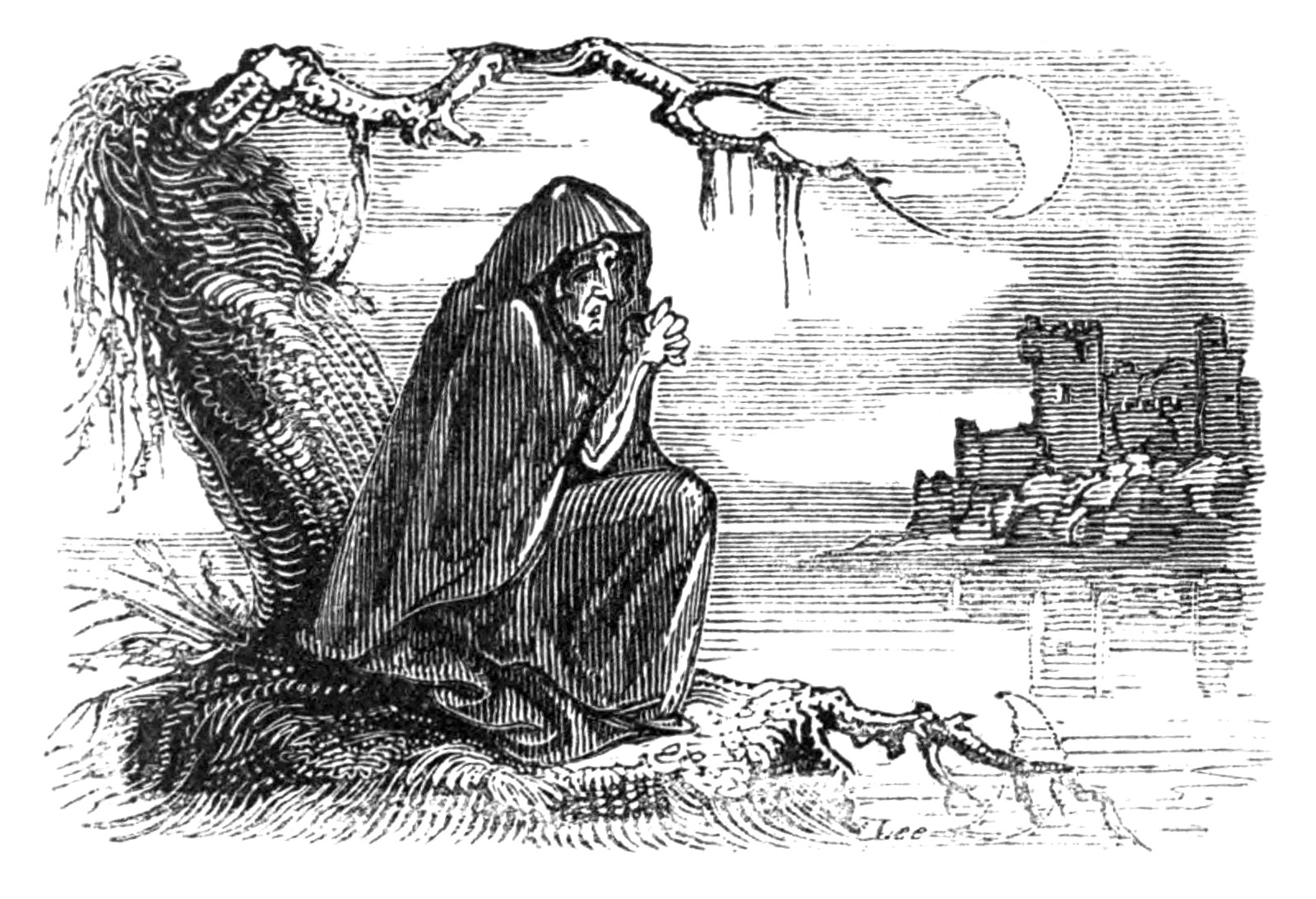
Bunworth Banshee, Fairy Legends and Traditions of the South of Ireland by Thomas Crofton Croker, 1825

=== Banshees ===
According to Irish mythology, keening laments are sung by banshees. A banshee could sing when a family member died or was about to die, even if the person had died far away and news of their death had not yet come. In those cases, her wailing would be the first warning the household had of the death.

Keening women have been described as "the (human) structural adjunct of the banshee".

Keening in County Kerry was said to be closest to the wailing of a banshee.

== Survival into the twentieth century ==
Authentic keening was effectively extinct by the early twentieth century. One of the attendees at the 1905 Requiem Mass of Father Allan MacDonald, an iconic figure in Scottish Gaelic literature, at St Michael's Roman Catholic Church on Eriskay, later recalled that it was the last funeral in which the tradition of Keening, or Coronach, was used in the Hebrides.

In the early 1950s, Cití Ní Ghallchóir (Kitty Gallagher) of Gaoth Dobhair in County Donegal, Ireland sang a keening song she had learnt from an old woman to Alan Lomax, which can be heard online. A recording of Gallagher's keening song was featured on the album Traditional Songs of Ireland (1995). Below is Gallagher's version with a translation.

S'airiú, (Word for lamenting – no literal translation)

Agus a leanbh (My child)

Cad a Dhéanfaidh mé? (What will I do?)

Tá tú ar shiúl uaim (You are gone from me)

Agus airiú

Agus anuiridh, níl duin ar bith agam (I've been left alone after a year)

'S airiú

Agus mé liom fein (I am alone)

Dá mbeithea go moch agam (If I were early)

Agus och, och, airiú, gan thú, gan thú (Alas, alas, without you, without you)

Seosamh Ó hÉanaí (Joe Heaney) of Carna, Connemara sang a traditional keening song which he learnt from his grandmother Béib (Bairbre) Uí Mhaoilchiaráin, who had lived during the nineteenth century. The recording is available on the official Joe Heaney website. Heaney was also recorded discussing his childhood memories of keening women in Connemara and the ways funeral traditions have changed since.

The album Songs of Aran (1957) has two recordings of keening songs collected from the oral tradition on the Aran Islands, both entitled Caoineadh na Marbh ('The Keening of the Dead’). Both of the recordings, which were made by Sidney Robertson Cowell, are reminiscent of the cronán, described by Eugene O’Curry as a ‘purring,’ beginning ‘in the 'chest or throat on a low key and rising gradually to the highest treble’.

The Tobar an Dualchais Scottish music archive has two recordings related to keening which are available to the public; the first is a keening song sung by Calum Johnston (1891–1972) of Barra, and the second is a verse performed by Donald MacIntyre (1899–1964) of South Uist said to have been used by paid keening women.

Phyllida Anam-Áire, author of The Celtic Book of Dying, heard keening in its traditional environment in the Donegal Gaeltacht in the 1940s, and described and sang a rendition of what she heard.

The lack of authentic recordings of keening songs may be due to the reluctance of singers to share something so private.

== In popular culture ==
John Millington Synge's one-act play Riders to the Sea (1904) features a chorus of women from the Aran Islands mourning the death of their loved ones at sea.

In 1986, Robin Williams and Carol Burnett performed a comical version of a keening song for a sketch called "The Funeral" as part of Carol, Carl, Whoopi and Robin.

Irish musician Róis explores keening on her 2024 album Mo Léan with samples of 20th century singers and her own interpretations of keening songs.

== See also ==
- Coronach
- Sean-nós singing
- Death wail
- Oppari
- Kulning
- Kinah
- Bocet

== Bibliography ==
- Sorce Keller, Marcello (2013). "Humanities Research (Expressing, Communicating, Sharing and Representing Grief and Sorrow with Organized Sound)" (PDF). ANU Press. 3. Australia: ANU E Press. pp. 3–14. ISSN 1440-0669.
