= Lament of Edward II =

Poem sometimes attributed to imprisoned King Edward II England

The Lament of Edward II (incipit: "En tenps de iver me survynt damage") is an Anglo-Norman poem traditionally credited to Edward II of England, and thought to have been written during his imprisonment shortly after he was deposed by his wife Isabella in January 1327. Not all scholars are convinced of the veracity of its attribution to Edward II, but Edward is clearly the intended persona of the poem. The poem, in fifteen stanzas, bears the heading De Le Roi Edward, le Fiz Roi Edward, Le Chanson Qe Il Fist Mesmes ("Of the King Edward, son of King Edward, the Song that He Made himself"). It was a chanson, and was likely to be sung to an existing tune. In each stanza two rhymes alternate, in approximately octosyllabic lines. The text survives in a manuscript on vellum at Longleat, bound into a volume titled Tractatus varii Theologici saec. XIII et XIV (76v and 77r); and in a manuscript (Royal MS 20 A II) of about the same date kept in the Royal manuscripts collection of the British Library. It was identified by Paul Studer and first published by him with a short literary introduction and an English translation in 1921.

"The tone of the poem, the line of arguments, the touches of deep personal feeling unmistakably stamp the work as genuine," Studer concluded. "The king's song is a rare and valuable specimen of Anglo-Norman lyric poetry." The poet uses the poetical conventions of Provençal love poetry to lament his fall, the loss of his queen and his kingdom. In the Provençal tradition of the canso, he commences by invoking the (winter) season and ends with an envoi. Its strongly religious coloring, didacticism, and references to courtly love and honour are all typical of Anglo-Norman poetry. In Studer's opinion, the poem compares favourably with contemporary poems of Northern France: "It is free from their mannerism and artifice, and possesses a directness of speech and an accent of deep sincerity which they seldom exhibit." Dominica Legge described it as one of the few Anglo-Norman political songs "with any claims to be judged as poetry."

A garbled account of this "lamentable complaynt" from manuscripts that he had seen, "with many other of the same makynge" was given by Robert Fabyan (died 1513), who rendered six lines of the incipit in Latin and offered his own "flowery and pedantic" variant in English. No other poems by Edward survive.
