= Lithuanian laments =

Genre of Folk Music in Lithuania

Lithuanian laments is an archaic genre of Lithuanian folk songs. There are two major categories of Lithuanian laments: funeral lament (laidotuvių rauda) and wedding lament (vestuvių rauda). Other kinds of laments are associated with various crucial, often misfortunate moments of life: illness, domestic misfortune (e.g., fire), soldier recruiting, etc.

A considerable number of motifs in laments are of international occurrence, confirming the ancient nature of laments, whose tradition originated before the forming of the nations.

Laments are traditionally performed without musical instruments.

== Funeral laments ==
There were no particular lamenting songs, and when lamenting women would improvise.

Usually lamenters were close relatives, however sometimes lamenters were hired. Themes of laments include the whole process of the funeral, from washing of the deceased to burial, as well as moments of the former life, world of the dead, and suffering of these who had lost a loved person.

Funeral laments are often based on rhetorical questions, such as "Why did you leave us for so long trip?", "In what flowers will you blossom?", etc.

== Wedding laments ==
Wedding laments (also called verkavimai ("weepings", "sobbings") done by crying, chanting, or talking) are usually performed by the bride on various occasions, such as invitation to the wedding, saying goodbye to the parents, leaving the house, thanking to the gifts, etc. In Dzūkija a wedding starts with the lament of the first bridesmaid. A lament of bride's mother, sister, or bridesmaid at the wedding is called priverkimas ("[thing] that makes you cry").

== Life of the tradition ==
In Lithuania Minor laments diappeared from the tradition in 19th century and known only from written sources. In Žemaitija laments disappeared in 20th century, some recordings were done in 1960s and 1980s. Funeral laments survived in the areas of Suvalkija, Veliuona, Seredžius and in Lithuanian villages in Belarus in the areas of Voranava and Astravyets.

== Lithuanian folklore collections that include laments ==
- Antanas Juška, Lietuviškos dainos, Vilnius, 1955
- Lietuvių tautosakos rinktinė, Vilnius, 1955
- Lietuvių tautosaka, vol. II, Dainos, raudos, Vilnius, Mintis, 1964
- Algirdas Patackas, Aleksandras Žarskus, Mirties virsmas: mirtis ir lydėtuvės, Vilnius, 1990
- Algirdas Patackas, Aleksandras Žarskus, Virsmų knyga: vestuvių virsmas, gimties virsmas, mirties virsmas, Kaunas, 2002, ISBN 9955-9316-1-2
- The fifteen volume edition of the Jonas Basanavičius Folklore Library (1993-2004) includes, among others, 180, laments.
