= Death wail =

Ritual mourning lament

The death wail is a keening, mourning lament, generally performed in ritual fashion soon after the death of a member of a family or tribe. Examples of death wails have been found in numerous societies, including among the Celts of Europe; and various indigenous peoples of Asia, the Americas, Africa, New Zealand and Australia.

== Australia ==
=== Early accounts ===
Some early accounts of the death wail describe its employment in the aftermath of fighting and disputes. One such discussion can be found in the second volume of Edward Eyre's Journal of Expeditions of Discovery Into Central Australia (1845). Eyre describes what appears to have been a parlay between the members of two rival tribes —

Notice having been given on the previous evening to the Moorunde natives of the approach of the Nar-wij-jerook tribe, they assembled at an early hour after sunrise, in as clear and open a place as they could find. Here they sat down in a long row to await the coming of their friends. The men were painted, and carried their weapons, as if for war. The women and children were in detached groups, a little behind them, or on one side, whilst the young men, on whom the ceremonies were to be performed, sat shivering with cold and apprehension in a row to the rear of the men, perfectly naked, smeared over from head to foot with grease and red-ochre, and without weapons. The Nar-wij-jerook tribe was now seen approaching. The men were in a body, armed and painted, and the women and children accompanying them a little on one side. They occasionally halted, and entered into consultation, and then, slackening their pace, gradually advanced until within a hundred yards of the Moorunde tribe. Here the men came to a full stop, whilst several of the women singled out from the rest, and marched into the space between the two parties, having their heads coated over with lime, and raising a loud and melancholy wail, until they came to a spot about equidistant from both, when they threw down their cloaks with violence, and the bags which they carried on their backs, and which contained all their worldly effects. The bags were then opened, and pieces of glass and shells taken out, with which they lacerated their thighs, backs, and breasts, in a most frightful manner, whilst the blood kept pouring out of the wounds in streams; and in this plight, continuing their wild and piercing lamentations, they moved up towards the Moorunde tribe, who sat silently and immovably in the place at first occupied. One of the women then went up to a strange native, who was on a visit to the Moorunde tribe and who stood neutral in the affair of the meeting, and by violent language and frantic gesticulations endeavoured to incite him to revenge the death of some relation or friend. But he could not be induced to lift his spear against the people amongst whom he was sojourning. After some time had been spent in mourning, the women took up their bundles again, and retiring, placed themselves in the rear of their own party. An elderly man then advanced, and after a short colloquy with the seated tribe, went back, and beckoned his own people to come forward, which they did slowly and in good order, exhibiting in front three uplifted spears, to which were attached the little nets left with them by the envoys of the opposite tribe, and which were the emblems of the duty they had come to perform, after the ordinary expiations had been accomplished.

In advancing, the Nar-wij-jerooks again commenced the death wail, and one of the men, who had probably sustained the greatest loss since the tribes had last met, occasionally in alternations of anger and sorrow addressed his own people. When near the Moorunde tribe a few words were addressed to them, and they at once rose simultaneously, with a suppressed shout. The opposite party then raised their spears, and closing upon the line of the other tribe, speared about fifteen or sixteen of them in the left arm, a little below the shoulder. This is the generally understood order of revenge; for the persons who were to receive the wounds, as soon as they saw the weapons of their assailants poised, at once put out the left foot, to steady themselves, and presented the left shoulder for the blow, frequently uttering the word "'Leipa" (spear), as the others appeared to hesitate.

Whilst this was going on, the influential men of each tribe were violently talking to each other, and apparently accusing one another of being accessory to the death of some of their people. Disclaimers passed on each side, and the blame was imputed to other and more distant tribes. The manes of the dead having been appeased, the honour of each party was left unsullied, and the Nar-wij-jerooks retired about a hundred yards, and sat down, ready to enter upon the ceremonies of the day, which will be described in another place.

Ernest Giles, who traversed Australia in the 1870s and 1880s, left an account of a skirmish that took place between his survey party and members of a local tribe in the Everard Ranges of mountains in 1882. "Our foes did not again appear," he recorded. "At the first dawn of light, over at some rocky hills south-westward, where, during the night, we saw their camp fires, a direful moaning chant arose. It was wafted on the hot morning air across the valley, echoed again by the rocks and hills above us, and was the most dreadful sound I think I ever heard; it was no doubt a death-wail. From their camp up in the rocks, the chanters descended to the lower ground, and seemed to be performing a funereal march all round the central mass, as the last tones we heard were from behind the hills, where it first arose."

A wax cylinder recording of the death wail of a Torres Strait Islander, made in 1898, exists in the Ethnographic Wax Cylinder collection maintained by the British Library.

=== Modern accounts ===
A more modern account of the death wail has been given by Roy Barker, a descendant of the Murawari tribe, some fifty miles north of the present town of Brewarrina. Barker was born on the old Aboriginal mission in the late 1920s and left there in the early 1940s.

"You hear the crying and the death wail at night," he recalled, "it's a real eerie, frightening sound to hear. Sad sound... to hear them all crying. And then after the funeral, everything would go back to normal. And they'd smoke the houses out, you know, the old Aboriginal way."

== Asia ==
China

Ritual wailing occurred as part of funerary rites in ancient China. These wails and laments were not (or were not always) uncontrollable expressions of emotion. Albert Galvany argues they were in fact "subject to a strict and complex process of codification that determines, right down to the finest details, the place, the timing and the ways in which such expressions of pain should be proffered".

The Liji ("Book of Rites") proclaimed that the mourner's type of relationship with the deceased dictated where the death wails should take place: for your brother it should take place in the ancestral temple; for your father's friend, opposite the great door of the ancestral temple; for your friend, opposite the main door of their private lodging; for an acquaintance, out in the countryside.

India

An oppari is an ancient form of lamenting in southern India, particularly in Tamil Nadu and North-East Sri Lanka where Tamils form the majority. It is a folk song tradition and is often an admixture of eulogy and lament. The oppari is typically sung by a group of female relatives who come to pay respects to the departed in a death ceremony. It in a means to express one's own grief and also to share and assuage the grief of the near and dear of the diseased. Sometimes professional oppari singers are recruited, but it is a dying practice.

== Hawaii ==
During the 1920s, ethnographers Laura Green and Martha Warren Beckwith described witnessing "old customs" such as death wails still in practice:

At intervals, from the time of death until after the burial, relatives and friends kept up a wailing cry as a testimony of respect to the dead. This custom is still in use today. It consists of an impromptu chant in words adapted to the individual case, broken by the wailing repetition of the syllable a-a-a.When a relative sees someone coming to the house of mourning who has been associated with the dead, he chants a lament expressing the connection of the new arrival with the dead.

== New Zealand ==
The apakura (wailing dirge, lament) is an important aspect of Māori tangihanga (funerary custom). Traditionally enacted by older women, the apakura is a poetic lament delivered with great emotion.

In The Maori: Yesterday and Today (1930), author and historian James Cowan wrote that:

Full of striking metaphors and often of poetical conceptions of great beauty, are the lyric laments and dirges which form by far the larger portion of the Maori poetry. The mourners as they gather on the marae at the wailing-place liken the dead chief to a lofty forest-tree overthrown—kua hinga te totara—to a carved war-canoe shattered by the waves. An orator or singer is likened to a tui or a bellbird—“my sweetest singing bird is hushed, that waked with melody the morn.” At these funeral gatherings the leading men of the assembled tribes will pace to and fro, fine flax or feather mats thrown across their shoulders, over their European clothes, and greenstone, whalebone or wooden weapons, cherished family heirlooms, in their hands, and thus address the dead:

“Go, O Sir! Go to the last resting place, the black pit of death! Go to the Reinga, the leaping-off place of departed spirits! Depart to that other world, to the home of Hine-nui-te-Po (the Great Lady of Night), for that is the great abode of us all.”

And again: “Who is this person, Death? [Ko wai tenei tangata, Aitua?] Had he but taken the form of a man, I could fight him with this taiaha of mine! But he is intangible, and he cannot be conquered.”

Sometimes ancient karakia to the departing soul are chanted: “Depart, O loved one, may your path be straight for the higher world [te Rangi]. Climb to that abode as Tawhaki climbed the divine vine to the first heaven to the second heaven”—and so to the tenth heaven. [Piki ake Tawhaki ki te Rangi].

The spirits of the dead take the long viewless trail for the land's end in the north:

“Pass thou along the far sands of Haumu, following the great path trodden bare by the feet of the innumerable dead, ever going the one way, and none returning.”

In a 2023 interview, educator Dr. Hiria Hape explained that the apakura was:

"(...) the deepest pain and mamae (ache, hurt) that a kuia (elder woman) could express at the marae (meeting place) (...) it's the deepest mamae that you feel in your puku (belly). Everything's in turmoil, in your stomach. Your heart is breaking. Your whole wairua (soul) is shattered. (The apakura) is to release all the mamae deep down."

== Death wail in literature ==
The death wail is mentioned in many literary works:

"She began the high, whining keen of the death wail... It rose to a high piercing whine and subsided into a moan. Mama raised it three times and then she turned and went into the house..." John Steinbeck's short story "Flight", set in the Santa Lucia Mountains

Tsitsi Dangarembga's Nervous Conditions, set in post-colonial Rhodesia (now Zimbabwe) gives an account of the death wail.

== See also ==
- Keening
- Banshee
- Oppari
