= Coronach =

Part of keening at a Gaelic ceremony

A coronach (also written coranich, corrinoch, coranach, cronach, etc.) is the Scottish Gaelic equivalent of the Gol, being the third part of a round of keening, the traditional improvised singing at a death, wake or funeral in the Highlands of Scotland and in Ireland. Though observers have reported hearing such songs in Ireland or in the Scottish Highlands, and melodies have been noted down and printed since the 18th century, audio recordings are rare; not only was the practice dying out or being suppressed through the 19th century, but it was also considered by its practitioners to have been a very personal and spiritual practice, not suitable for performance or recording.

The Scottish border ballad The Bonny Earl of Murray is supposedly composed in the tradition of the coronach.

Schubert's Opus 52 No 4 (D 836), which uses words from Sir Walter Scott's Lady of the Lake in an arrangement for female choir with piano accompaniment, bears the title Coronach.

== In popular culture ==
- Progressive rock group Jethro Tull released, with Dee Palmer, a single called "Coronach" in 1986. The single was used as the theme tune to the Channel 4 programme "The Blood Of The British".
- Melodic death metal band Eternal Tears of Sorrow have a song entitled "Coronach" on their 1998 album, Vilda Mánnu.
- Death metal band Hate Eternal have an instrumental song entitled "Coronach" as the last song on their 2008 album, Fury and Flames. (The album as a whole is dedicated to Jared Anderson, a deceased friend and former bandmate of band leader Erik Rutan.)
- Scottish black/speed metal band Hellripper have released an album titled Coronach.
