= Bocet =

Bocet (Romanian pronunciation: [ˈbo.t͡ʃet]) is a form of Romanian folk music. Bocetul is Romanian for "lament", and indeed, a Bocet is a lament in free rhythm.

They are usually sung by "lamenting women", with their eyes in tears or just expressing a deep grief. Encountered throughout Romania, bocet is a part of the traditional mourning observances.

== See also ==
- Songs to the dead
- Romaninan traditional music
