= Lament =

Literary genre

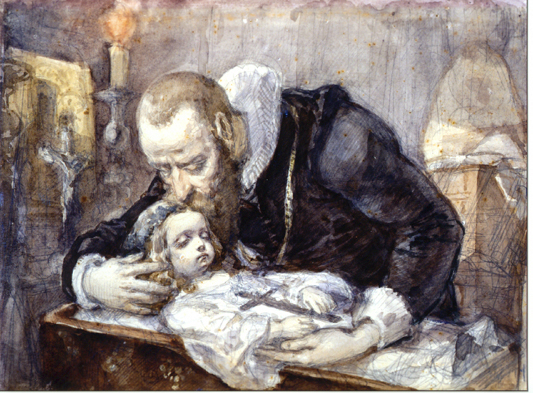
Jan Kochanowski with dead daughter in painting inspired by the poet's Laments

A lament or lamentation is a passionate expression of grief, often in music, poetry, or song form. The grief is most often born of regret, or mourning. Laments can also be expressed in a verbal manner in which participants lament about something that they regret or someone that they have lost, and they are usually accompanied by wailing, moaning and/or crying. Laments constitute some of the oldest forms of writing, and examples exist across human cultures.

== History ==
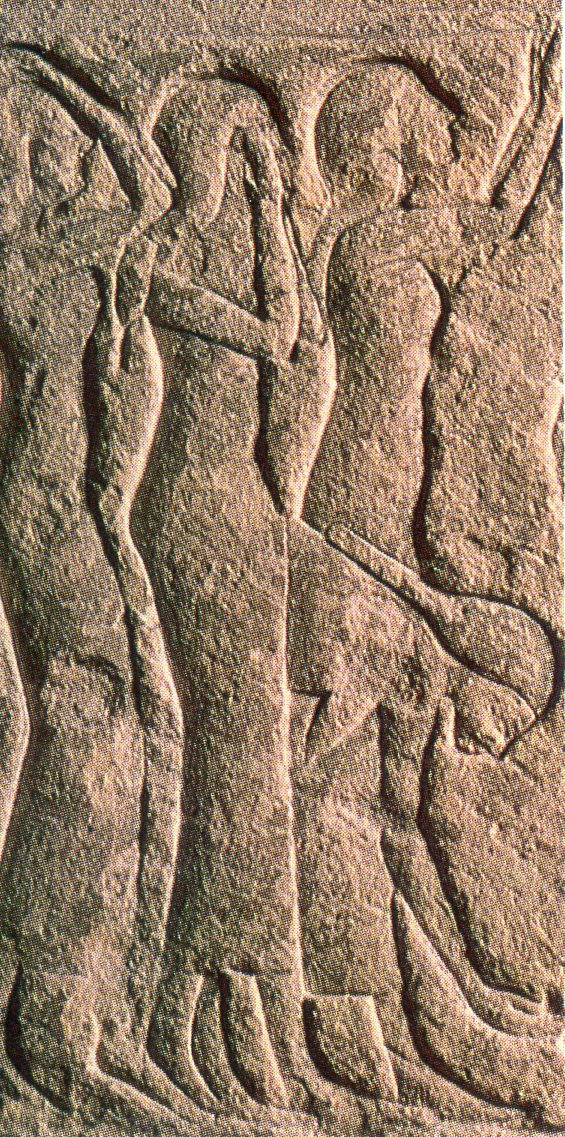
Egyptian women weeping and lamenting

Many of the oldest and most lasting poems in human history have been laments. The Lament for Sumer and Ur dates back at least 4000 years to ancient Sumer, the world's first urban civilization. Laments are present in both the Iliad and the Odyssey, and laments continued to be sung in elegiacs accompanied by the aulos in classical and Hellenistic Greece. Elements of laments appear in Beowulf, in the Hindu Vedas, and in ancient Near Eastern religious texts. They are included in the Mesopotamian City Laments such as the Lament for Ur and the Jewish Tanakh, or Christian Old Testament.

In many oral traditions, both early and modern, the lament has been a genre usually performed by women: Batya Weinbaum made a case for the spontaneous lament of women chanters in the creation of the oral tradition that resulted in the Iliad The material of lament, the "sound of trauma" is as much an element in the Book of Job as in the genre of pastoral elegy, such as Shelley's "Adonais" or Matthew Arnold's "Thyrsis".

The Book of Lamentations or Lamentations of Jeremiah figures in the Old Testament. The Lamentation of Christ (under many closely variant terms) is a common subject from the Life of Christ in art, showing Jesus' dead body being mourned after the Crucifixion. Jesus himself lamented over the prospective fall of Jerusalem as he and his disciples entered the city ahead of his passion.

A lament in the Book of Lamentations or in the Psalms, in particular in the Lament/Complaint Psalms of the Tanakh, may be looked at as "a cry of need in a context of crisis when Israel lacks the resources to fend for itself". Another way of looking at it is all the more basic: laments simply being "appeals for divine help in distress". These laments, too, often have a set format: an address to God, description of the suffering/anguish from which one seeks relief, a petition for help and deliverance, a curse towards one's enemies, an expression of the belief of ones innocence or a confession of the lack thereof, a vow corresponding to an expected divine response, and lastly, a song of thanksgiving. Examples of a general format of this, both in the individual and communal laments, can be seen in Psalm 3 and Psalm 44 respectively.

The Lament of Edward II, if it is actually written by Edward II of England, is the sole surviving composition of his.

A heroine's lament is a conventional fixture of baroque opera seria, accompanied usually by strings alone, in descending tetrachords. Because of their plangent cantabile melodic lines, evocatively free, non-strophic construction and adagio pace, operatic laments have remained vividly memorable soprano or mezzo-soprano arias even when separated from the emotional pathos of their operatic contexts. An early example is Ariadne's "Lasciatemi morire", which is the only survivor of Claudio Monteverdi's lost Arianna. Francesco Cavalli's operas extended the lamento formula, in numerous exemplars, of which Ciro's "Negatemi respiri" from Ciro is notable.

Other examples include Dido's Lament ("When I am laid in earth") (Henry Purcell, Dido and Aeneas), "Lascia ch'io pianga" (George Frideric Handel, Rinaldo), "Caro mio ben" (Tomaso or Giuseppe Giordani). The lament continued to represent a musico-dramatic high point. In the context of opera buffa, the Countess's lament, "Dove sono", comes as a surprise to the audience of Wolfgang Amadeus Mozart's The Marriage of Figaro, and in Gioachino Rossini's Barber of Seville, Rosina's plaintive words at her apparent abandonment are followed, not by the expected lament aria, but by a vivid orchestral interlude of storm music. The heroine's lament remained a fixture in romantic opera, and the Marschallin's monologue in act 1 of Der Rosenkavalier can be understood as a penetrating psychological lament.

In modernity, discourses about melancholia and trauma take the functional place ritual laments hold in premodern societies. This entails a shift from a focus on community and convention to individuality and authenticity.

== Scottish laments ==
The purely instrumental lament is a common form in piobaireachd music for the Scottish bagpipes. "MacCrimmon's Lament" dates to the Jacobite uprising of 1745. The tune is held to have been written by Donald Ban MacCrimmon, piper to the MacLeods of Dunvegan, who supported the Hanoverians. It is said that Donald Ban, who was killed at Moy in 1746, had an intimation that he would not return.

A well-known Gaelic lullaby is "Griogal Cridhe" ("Beloved Gregor"). It was composed in 1570 after the execution of Gregor MacGregor by the Campbells. The grief-stricken widow, Marion Campbell, describes what happened as she sings to her child.

"Cumhadh na Cloinne" ("Lament for the Children") is a pìobaireachd composed by Padruig Mór MacCrimmon in the early 1650s. It is generally held to be based on the loss of seven of MacCrimmon's eight sons within a year to smallpox, possibly brought to Skye by a Spanish trading vessel. Poet and writer Angus Peter Campbell, quoting poet Sorley MacLean, has called it "one of the great artistic glories of all Europe". Author Bridget MacKenzie, in Piping Traditions of Argyll, suggests that it refers to the slaughter of the MacLeods fighting Cromwell's forces at the Battle of Worcester. It may have been inspired by both.

Other Scottish laments from outside of the piobaireachd tradition include "Lowlands Away", "MacPherson's Rant", and "Hector the Hero".

== Lament in Ancient Greece ==
Ritual lament was intertwined with aspects of performance in Ancient Greece. Originally practiced as a part of funerary rites, lamentation was considered a musical and feminine form of expression that was used to appease the deceased. As lament was brought into popular culture, specifically Greek theater and literature, men participated in the tradition as well, but the act of lamentation itself was still closely associated with women.

Performed primarily by women during the próthesis step of the burial, ritual lament in the Archaic and Homeric periods was a ritualized expression of emotion imbued with musical elements. The lament involved both verbal and physical actions, such as singing, wailing, tearing of the clothes, and beating the breast, all of which contributed to the sound of lamentation. Depictions of lament can be found on vessels, funerary plaques, and other archeological remains, where the imagery of the women’s expressive actions contrast with the more static poses of the men. The gendering of ritual lamentation reflects the gender roles of the time, wherein women were perceived to be more prone to emotion in contrast to men, who were seen as creatures of logos.

In the Archaic and Homeric ages, lament was understood to be divided into two distinct parts: gôos and thrënos. Moving into the Classical period, however, gôos and thrënos were often used as interchangeably, particularly in Athenian tragedy. Lamenting women appeared in works by well-known tragedians, such as Cassandra's lament in Aeschylus' Agamenon, Electra's lament in Sophocles' Electra, and Hecuba's lament in Euripides' Trojan Women. Tragedians also developed another genre of lament, kommos, that appeared exclusively in tragedies. Ritual lament also inspired male poets, who adopted the practice into more literary forms. Written laments could be addressed to the divine or personalized for a poet’s close friend.

Ritual Lament in Athens During the Age of Solon’s Laws

Athenian policymaker Solon placed restrictions on women’s participation in funerary rites. Solon’s laws set limitations on women’s dress and behavior, controlling the way that women were allowed to appear in public for funerary occasions. His laws also had an impact on the burial proceedings in relation to women’s roles, as he forbid “laceration of the flesh by mourners,” “bewailing” and the use of set lamentations. These policies could have been made to address the level of noise that accompanied the ritual lament step of funerals and to curb extravagance from the wealthy. However, Plutarch comments that Solon’s laws concerning women seemed, in general, “very absurd.” He expressed that Solon’s laws were rather unfavorable towards women, using examples such as Solon’s policies on sexual assault. Modern interpretations of these changes comment on the disruptive potential of the lament on a political level. In Athens, where logic and rationality were valued, the emotional nature of the lament was not viewed favorably by men in power.

Lament During the Festival of Adonia

The connection between lamentation and femininity is made apparent in the Athenian festival of Adonia. An event held exclusively for women, by women, the main purpose of this festival was to mourn the death of Adonis, the lover of the goddess Aphrodite. During this festival, women participated in collective lamenting. Women took to the rooftops to perform their lament and held a procession in the streets. In fragments of Sappho’s work, a lament for Adonis appears. Sappho’s work gives insight on some of the activities that may have occurred during this festival. In her poem, Sappho calls on women to engage in actions such as “beating your bosoms” and “rending your tunics.” These actions are the same activities that women would do for burial rituals. The Greek poet Bion also wrote a Lament for Adonis. His poem records the ritual laments of Adonia in hexameter, unlike Sappho, who wrote in lyric meter. Throughout his lament, he makes frequent references to Aphrodite, who also referred to by the name Cytherea. His words show the close association between Adonis and Aphrodite. Sappho and Bion’s works are also demonstrative of how the tradition lament expanded from oral to literary form.

References to the Adonia is made in Aristophanes’ Lysistrata. In the play, the male characters express a distaste for the Adonia, particularly due to the loud nature of the lamentation process. In fact, there is a scene in the Lysistrata, a play by Aristophanes, where the lamentations of the women celebrating the Adonia drown out those of the male characters who are attempting to hold an Assembly. Modern interpretations of this festival have drawn upon the disruptive characteristic of the Adonia to suggest that the festival was a form of subversion. Firstly, the Adonia was not only organized strictly by women, but also was a celebration that was not associated with the state. The exclusion of men in the entirety of the festival process is demonstrates female agency. Furthermore, during the Adonia, Athenian women were allowed to be in public and to make their voices heard in a dramatic manner. The festival allowed women the opportunity to create a type of independent community as well as to present their voices and bodies in the public sphere. Athenian women were expected to remain in the household, whereas men were the ones who engaged in politics, business, and agriculture. It is argued that women embraced this festival because Adonia permitted them to subvert gender roles in a socially acceptable way.

Types of Musical Lament

- Gôos

Performed by the close female relatives of the deceased, gôos was a spontaneous expression of grief. Gôos involved wailing, tearing of the hair, outstretched arms, and beating of the breast.

- Thrënos

The gôos was accompanied by the thrënos, consisting of a set dirge, usually performed by hired musicians. In comparison to gôos, thrënos was more organized and musically polished. The singing often contained praise for the deceased.

- Kommos

Kommos emerged in the Classical era on the stage of Athenian tragedy. Like ritual lament, kommos is performed by female characters in conjunction with the play’s choral mourners in an expression of dramatic grief.

- Ailinon (Αἴλινον)

According to the Suda, it was a type of lament and song, applied both to dirges and hymns, and named after Ailinos, the son of the Muse Calliope. The term ailinos (Αἴλινος) was also used to describe something mournful or dirge-like.

== Musical form ==
There is a short, free musical form appearing in the Baroque and then again in the Romantic periods, called lament. It is typically a set of harmonic variations in homophonic texture, wherein the bass (Lament bass) descends through a tetrachord, usually one suggesting a minor mode.

== See also ==
- Dirge
- Death poem
- Death wail
- Elegy
- Endecha, Galician lament, subgenre of the planto
- Keening
- Kinah (plural: kinnot) – Kinnot are traditional Hebrew poems recited on Tisha B'Av lamenting the destruction of the First and Second Temples and other historical catastrophes. (The term "kinah" also appears in the Bible, referring to lamentation).
- Kommós
- Lament bass
- Lithuanian laments
- Mawwal, Middle Eastern variant
- Threnody
- Oppari
- Songs to the dead, Romanian funeral songs
