= Kommos (theatre) =

Lyrical song of lamentation in an Athenian tragedy

A kommos (from Greek κομμός, kommós, literally "striking", especially "beating of the head and breast in mourning") is a lyrical song of lamentation in an Athenian tragedy that the chorus and a dramatic character sing together. It is also found in comedies with certain peculiarities. A kommos occurs "when the tension of the play rises to a climax of grief or horror or joy". Examples include the final section (lines 908–1077) of Aeschylus' The Persians (472 BCE) in which Xerxes laments the defeat of his Persian army, the final appearance of Antigone in Sophocles' Antigone (c.442 BCE), the interaction between the chorus and Oedipus when he returns having blinded himself in Sophocles' Oedipus Rex (c.429 BCE), and the exchange between Orestes, Electra and the chorus immediately after Clytemnestra's murder in Euripides' Electra (c.410 BCE).

== See also ==
- Theatre of ancient Greece
- Monody (Greek) - a "solo song" sung by a dramatic character without the chorus
- Lament
- Elegy

== Sources ==
- Baldry, Harold Caparne. 1971. The Greek Tragic Theatre. Ancient Culture and Society ser. London: Chatto & Windus. ISBN 0-7011-1629-3.
- Rehm, Rush. 1992. Greek Tragic Theatre. Theatre Production Studies ser. London and New York: Routledge. ISBN 0-415-11894-8.
