= 1490s in poetry =

This article covers 1490s in poetry. Nationality words link to articles with information on the nation's poetry or literature (for instance, Irish or France).

== Works published ==
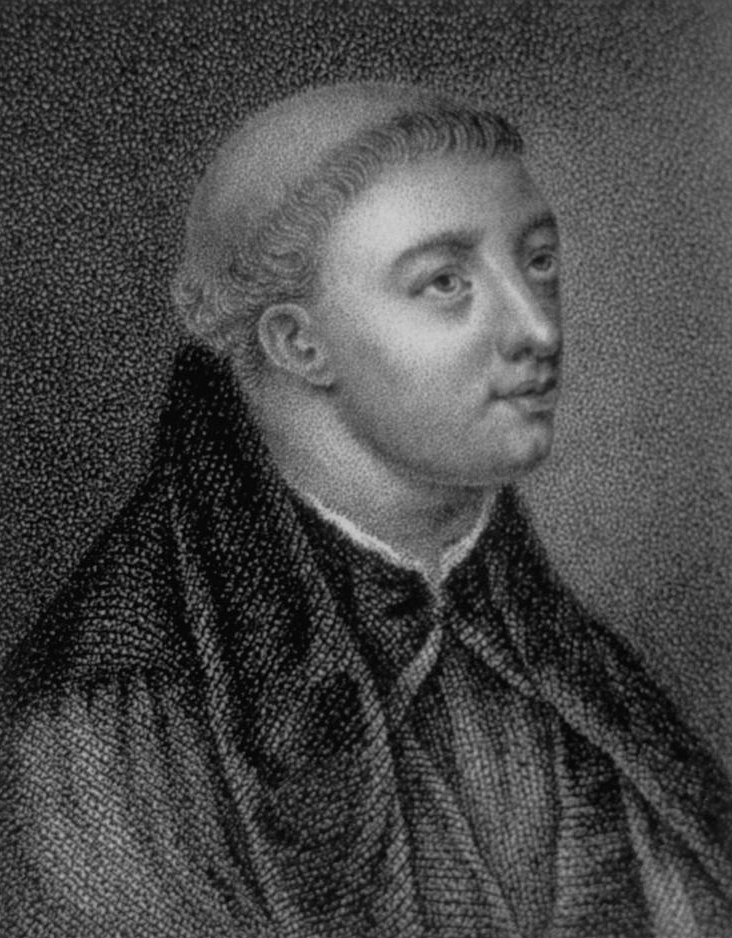
English poet John Lydgate, died c. 1451 but published this decade

1491:

- Immanuel of Rome, Mahberot Imanu'el, published in Brescia, Italy, among the first books in Hebrew printed in Italy

1492:

- Savonarola, Apologeticus De Ratione Poeticae Artis, criticism; Italy
- Jorge Manrique, Coplas de Manrique por la muerte de su padre ("Couplets on the Death of His Father" or "Stanzas for the Death of His Father"), Spanish lyric poem

1493:

- Mir Ali Shir Nava'i, Mizan al-Awzan ("Scales of Poetic Meters"), Turkish poems

1494:

- John Lydgate, The Fall of Princes, 36,000-line poem translated c. 1431–1438 from the De casibus illustrium virorum of Boccaccio (see also Lydgate's Proverbs 1510), posthumously published
- Shin Maha Rahtathara, Bhuridat Zatpaung Pyo, Burmese poem
- Sebastian Brant, Das Narrenschiff ("The Ship of Fools"), much-translated satire, year of publication disputed, German

1495:

- Matteo Maria Boiardo, Orlando Innamorato ("Orlando in Love"), epic poem, Italy

1496:

- Juan del Encina, Cancionero, one-act Spanish verse drama and poetry
- Gyssaub Vaeze Kashefi, Aklake Mohseni ("Morals of the Beneficent"), prose and verse, Persian
- Shin Maha Rahtathara, Tada uti Mawgun, Burmese poetry collection

1497:

- John Lydgate, published anonymously, The Siege of Thebes, publication year uncertain, adapted c. 1421–1422 from an unknown French prose romance, posthumously published
- Jacob Locher, Das Narrenschiff, a translation, sometimes loose, into Latin from the original German of Das Narrenschiff ("The Ship of Fools") by Sebastian Brant
- Paul Riviere, a translation into French of Das Narrenschiff ("The Ship of Fools") by Sebastian Brant, from the original German

1498:

- Hinrek van Alkmaar, Reinke de Vos ("Reynard the Fox"), animal epic poem, Netherlands
- Mir Ali Shir Nava'i, Char Divan ("Four Divans"), lyric poems Chagatai Turkish

1499:

- John Skelton, published anonymously, The Bouge of Court, publication year uncertain, written in 1488; a satirical dream-allegory about court life
- Gilber Hay (or perhaps "Gilbert the Hay", who may have been a different person) publishes The Buik of King Alexander the Conquerour, part of The Buik of Alexander romance stories
- Pierre Gringore, Chasteau de Labour, printed by Antoine Vérard, France

== Births ==
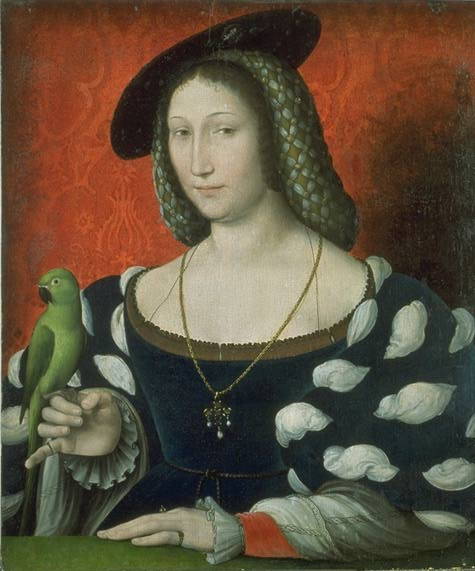
Marguerite de Navarre, born 1491

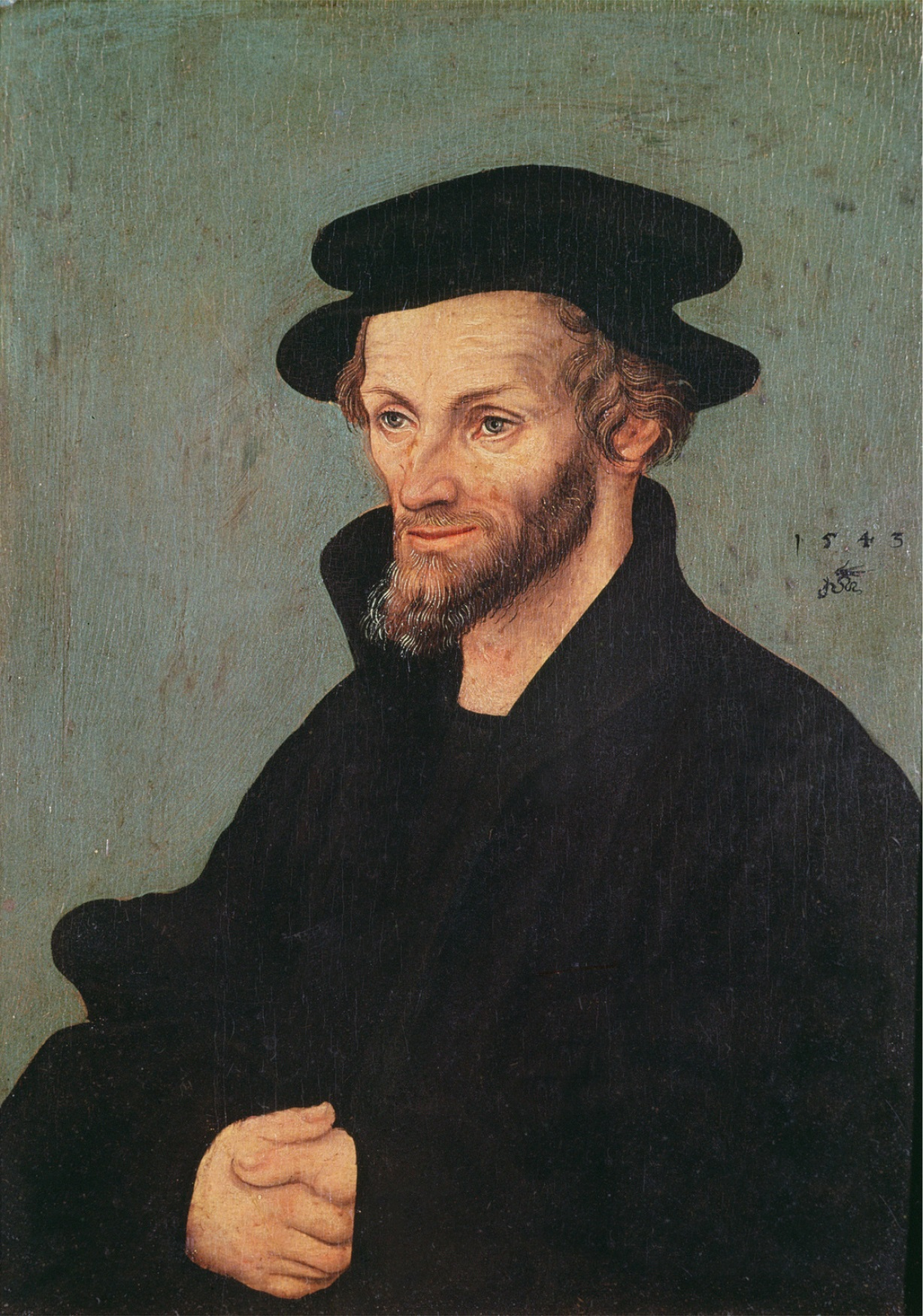
Portrait of Philip Melanchthon (born 1497), by Lucas Cranach the Elder

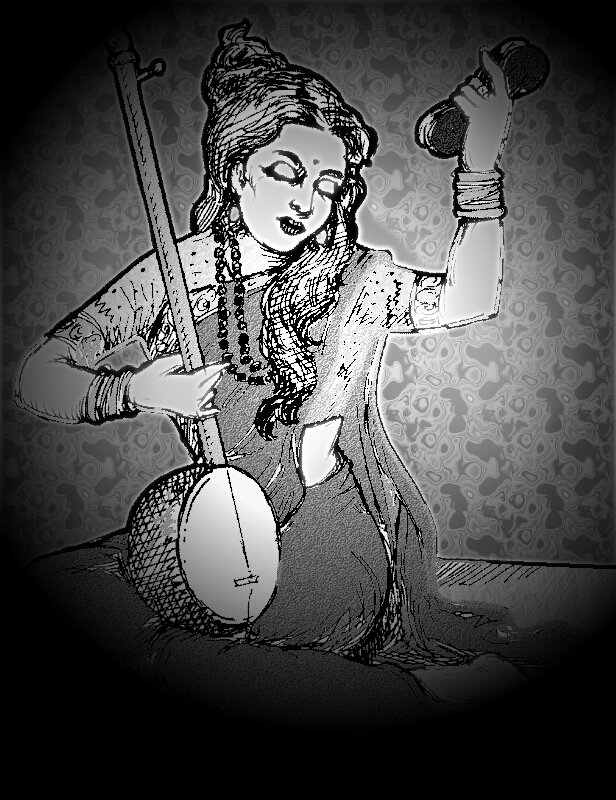
Artist's depiction of Mirabai, Hindu poet, born 1498

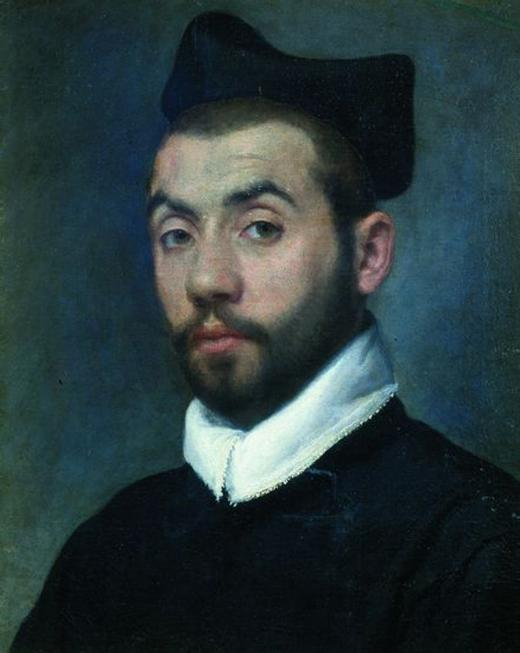
French poet Clément Marot

Death years link to the corresponding "[year] in poetry" article. There are conflicting or unreliable sources for the birth years of many people born in this period; where sources conflict, the poet is listed again and the conflict is noted:

1490:

- April – Vittoria Colonna (died 1547), Italian
- Girolamo Angeriano, also known as "Hieronymus Angerianus" born sometime between about 1470 and about 1490 (died 1535), Italian, Latin-language poet; sources differ on his birth year, with some stating 1470, others giving "c. 1480" and another c. 1490
- Juan Boscan, original Catalan name: "Joan Boscà Almogàver", born about this year (died 1542), Catalan poet who wrote in Spanish
- Cristobal de Castillejo born about this year (died 1550), Spanish
- Sir David Lindsay (died c. 1555), Scottish
- Jean Salmon Macrin (died 1557), French, Latin-language poet
- Francesco Pittiani, born about this year (died 1552), Italian, Latin-language poet
- Giuseppe Sporeni, born about this year (died after 1562), Italian, Latin-language poet

1491:

- November 8 – Teofilo Folengo, (died 1544), Italian poet who wrote in Italian, Latin and a Macaronic style mixing the two
- Bach Van, also known as "Nguyen Bin Khiem", Vietnamese poet
- Latifî, also known as Kastamonulu Latifî Çelebi, Ottoman poet and bibliographer
- Mellin de Saint-Gelais (died 1558), French poet of the Renaissance and Poet Laureate of Francis I of France

1492:

- Pietro Aretino (died 1556), Italian poet and playwright
- Antoine Héroët, poète et clerc français, mort vers 1567.
- Marguerite de Navarre, also known as "Marguerite of Angoulême" and "Margaret of Navarre" (died 1549), French queen consort of King Henry II of Navarre; patron of humanists and reformers, author, playwright and poet

1493:

- September 28 – Agnolo Firenzuola (died c. 1545), Italian
- Anna Bijns (died 1575), Dutch
- Ján Silván (born 1573), Slovak
- Bernardo Tasso (died 1569), Italian

1494:

- November 5 – Hans Sachs (born 1576), German

1495:

- March 6 – Luigi Alamanni (died 1556), Italian poet and statesman
- Francisco Sa de Miranda (died 1558), Portuguese
- Fuzûlî, also known as "Mehmed ibn Suleyman", Turkish
- Suleiman the Magnificent born about this year (died 1566), Ottoman Empire sultan and poet

1496:

- November 23 – Clément Marot (died 1544), French
- Lazare de Baïf (died 1547), French poet, diplomat and humanist
- Lorenzo Gambara, born about this year (died 1586), Italian, Latin-language poet
- Richard Maitland (died 1586), Scottish
- Girolamo Muzio (died 1575), Italian, Latin-language poet
- Nawade I, Burmese
- Adam Reusner born sometime from 1471 to this year (died sometime from 1563 to 1582), German
- Johann Walter (died 1570), German poet and composer
- Lu Zhi (died 1576), Chinese landscape painter, calligrapher and poet

1497:

- August 13 – Tulsidas (died 1623), Indian saint and poet
- Francesco Berni born about this year, according to some sources, others say 1498 (died 1535), Italian writer and poet
- Philipp Melanchthon (died 1560), German professor, theologian and poet

1498:

- Francesco Berni born this year, according to some sources, others say he was born about 1497 (died 1535), Italian, Latin-language poet
- Huang O (died 1569), Chinese poet
- Marcantonio Flaminio (died 1550), Italian, Latin-language poet
- Meerabai मीराबाई (died 1547), alternate spelling: Meera, Mira, Meera Bai; Indian, Hindu poet-saint, mystical poet whose compositions, extant version of which are in Gujarati and a Rajasthani dialect of Hindi, remain popular throughout India

1499:

- Sebastian Franck, who called himself "Franck von Word" (died 1542 or 1543), German freethinker, humanist, radical reformer and poet

== Deaths ==
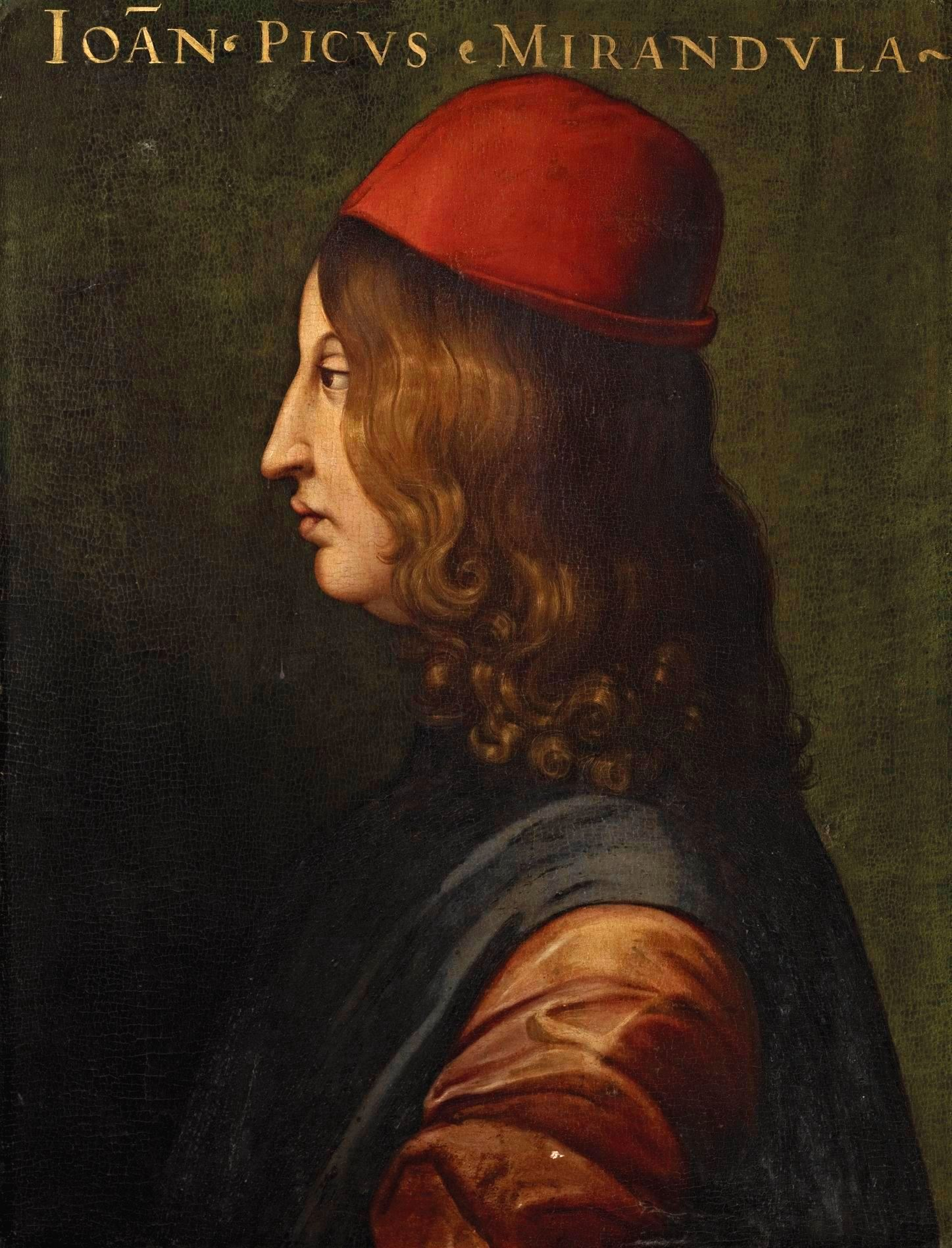
Giovanni Pico della Mirandola; portrait by an unknown artist, in the Uffizi, Florence

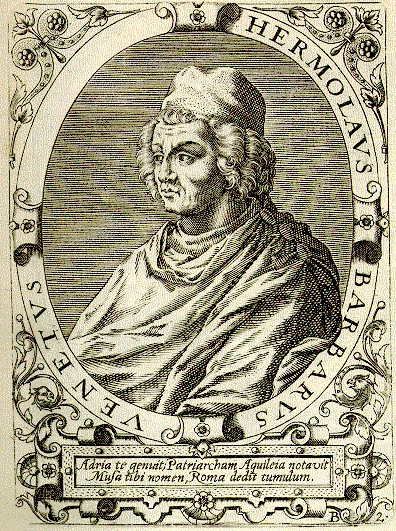
Ermolao Barbaro

Birth years link to the corresponding "[year] in poetry" article:

1490:

- Giovanni Michele Alberto Carrara (born 1438), Italian, Latin-language poet
- Alessandro Cortesi (born 1460), Italian, Latin-language poet
- Dafydd Gorlech (born 1410), Welsh language poet
- Gómez Manrique (born 1412), Spanish poet, soldier, politician and dramatist
- Sean mac Fergail Óicc Ó hÚigínn, Irish poet and Ollamh Érenn
- Francesco Rolandello (born 1427), Italian, Latin-language poet
- Martino Filetico (born 1430), Italian, Latin-language poet

1491:

- Jean Meschinot (born 1420), French

1492:

- November 6 – Antoine Busnois (born c. 1430), French composer and poet
- Blind Harry, also known as "Henry the Minstrel", (born c. 1440), Scottish makar (poet)
- Jami (born 1414), Persian scholar, mystic, writer, composer of numerous lyrics and idylls, historian, and Sufi poet
- Alfonso de Palencia (born 1423), Castilian pre-Renaissance historian, writer, and poet
- Lorenzo de' Medici (born 1440), Italian banker, politician, patron of the arts and poet who wrote in his native Tuscan

1493:

- Ermolao Barbaro, sources differ on his death year, with some simply stating this year and others stating this year and 1495 are each possible, born 1453), Italian, Latin-language poet
- Guto'r Glyn, approximate date (born c.1412), Welsh language poet

1494:

- November 17 – Giovanni Pico della Mirandola (born 1463), Renaissance humanist and Italian, Latin-language poet
- December 20 – Matteo Maria Boiardo (born c. 1434), Italian poet
- Galeotto Marzio, died this year or 1497 (born 1427 or 1428), Italian, Latin-language poet
- Angelo Poliziano, (born 1454), Italian, Latin-language poet

1495:

- Ermolao Barbaro, sources differ in his death year, with some simply giving 1493 and others stating that either that year or this year is possible (born 1453), Italian, Latin-language poet
- C. Aurelio Cambini died sometime after 1494 (born c. 1463), Italian, Latin-language poet

1496:

- Callimaco Esperiente (born 1437), Italian, Latin-language poet

1497:

- Galeotto Marzio died this year or 1494 (born 1427/1428), Italian, Latin-language poet

1498:

- Rodrigo Cota de Maguaque (born unknown), Spanish poet
- Diego de San Pedro (born 1437), Castilian writer and poet
- Cristoforo Landino (born 1424), Italian, Latin-language poet
- Conor Carragh Ó Curnín (born unknown), Irish poet

1499:

- Quinto Emiliano Cimbriaco died about this year (born 1449), Italian, Latin-language poet
- Probo de Marianis (born 1455), Italian, Latin-language poet
- Jeronim Vidulić (birth year unknown), Croatian Renaissance poet

== See also ==
- Poetry
- 15th century in poetry
- 15th century in literature
- List of years in poetry
- Grands Rhétoriqueurs
- French Renaissance literature
- Renaissance literature
- Spanish Renaissance literature

Other events:

- Other events of the 15th century
- Other events of the 16th century

16th century:

- 16th century in poetry
- 16th century in literature
