= 1502 in poetry =

Nationality words link to articles with information on the nation's poetry or literature (for instance, Irish or France).

== Events ==
- Stephen Hawes appointed to Valet de chambre under Henry VII of England
- Poet Laureate John Skelton imprisoned

== Works published ==
=== Italy ===
- Pietro Bembo, Terzerime, published by Aldus Manutius
- Baptista Mantuanus, Sylvae, eight volumes, Bologna; Italian, Latin-language poet
- Jacopo Sannazaro, Arcadia, a pirated edition (the author officially sanctioned publication in 1504); a manuscript of the original work is dated 1489, with two eclogues and connecting prose added later, seemingly reflecting the author's distress at political developments of about 1500; Italy

=== Other ===
- Conradus Celtis, Amores, folk poem, German poet writing in Latin

== Births ==
Death years link to the corresponding "[year] in poetry" article:

- Guillaume Bigot (died 1550), French writer, doctor, humanist and poet in French and Latin
- Benedetto Varchi, some sources say he may have been born this year or 1503, others say his birth year is 1503 (died 1565), Italian, Latin-language poet

== Deaths ==
Birth years link to the corresponding "[year] in poetry" article:

- February – Olivier de la Marche (born 1426), French poet and chronicler
- Also:
  - Elisio Calenzio (born 1430), Italian, Latin-language poet
  - Jalaladdin Davani (born 1426), Iranian philosopher, theologian, jurist and poet
  - Gian Giacomo della Croce, died after this year (born c. 1450), Italian, Latin-language poet
  - Gwerful Mechain, died about this year (born c. 1460?), female Welsh erotic poet
  - Bonino Mombrizio, died 1482 or this year (born 1424), Italian, Latin-language poet
  - Octavien de Saint-Gelais (born 1468), French churchman, poet and translator
  - Domnall mac Brian Ó hÚigínn (born unknown), Irish poet
  - Sōgi 宗祇 (born 1421), Japanese Zen monk who studied waka and renga poetry, then became a professional renga poet in his 30s

== See also ==
- Poetry
- 16th century in poetry
- 16th century in literature
- French Renaissance literature
- Grands Rhétoriqueurs
- Renaissance literature
- Spanish Renaissance literature
