= 1550 in poetry =

This article covers 1550 in poetry. Nationality words link to articles with information on the nation's poetry or literature (for instance, Irish or France).

== Works published ==
=== Great Britain ===
- Charles Bansley, The Pride of Women
- Robert Crowley, One and Thyrtye Epigrammes
- John Heywood, An Hundred Epigrammes
- William Langland (attributed), Piers Plowman, the B text
- Sir Thomas Wyatt, Pentential Psalms

=== France ===
- Joachim du Bellay, Musagnoeomachie
- Pierre de Ronsard:
  - Bocage
  - Odes, the first four books

== Births ==
Death years link to the corresponding "[year] in poetry" article:

- 12 April – Edward de Vere, 17th Earl of Oxford (died 1604), English courtier, playwright, poet, sportsman, patron of numerous writers, and sponsor of at least two acting companies
- Also:
  - Baothghalach Mór Mac Aodhagáin (died 1600), Irish poet part of the Mac Aodhagáin clan
  - Kasper Miakskowski (died 1622), Polish
  - Alexander Montgomerie (died 1598), Scottish
  - Mikolaj Sep Szarzynski born about this year (died c. 1581), Polish
  - Shlomo Ephraim Luntschitz (died 1619), rabbi, poet and Torah commentator
  - Richard Rowlands (died 1640), Anglo-Dutch antiquarian and writer
  - Cristóbal de Virués (died 1614), Spanish playwright and poet
- Syed Sultan (died 1648), Bengali poet

== Deaths ==
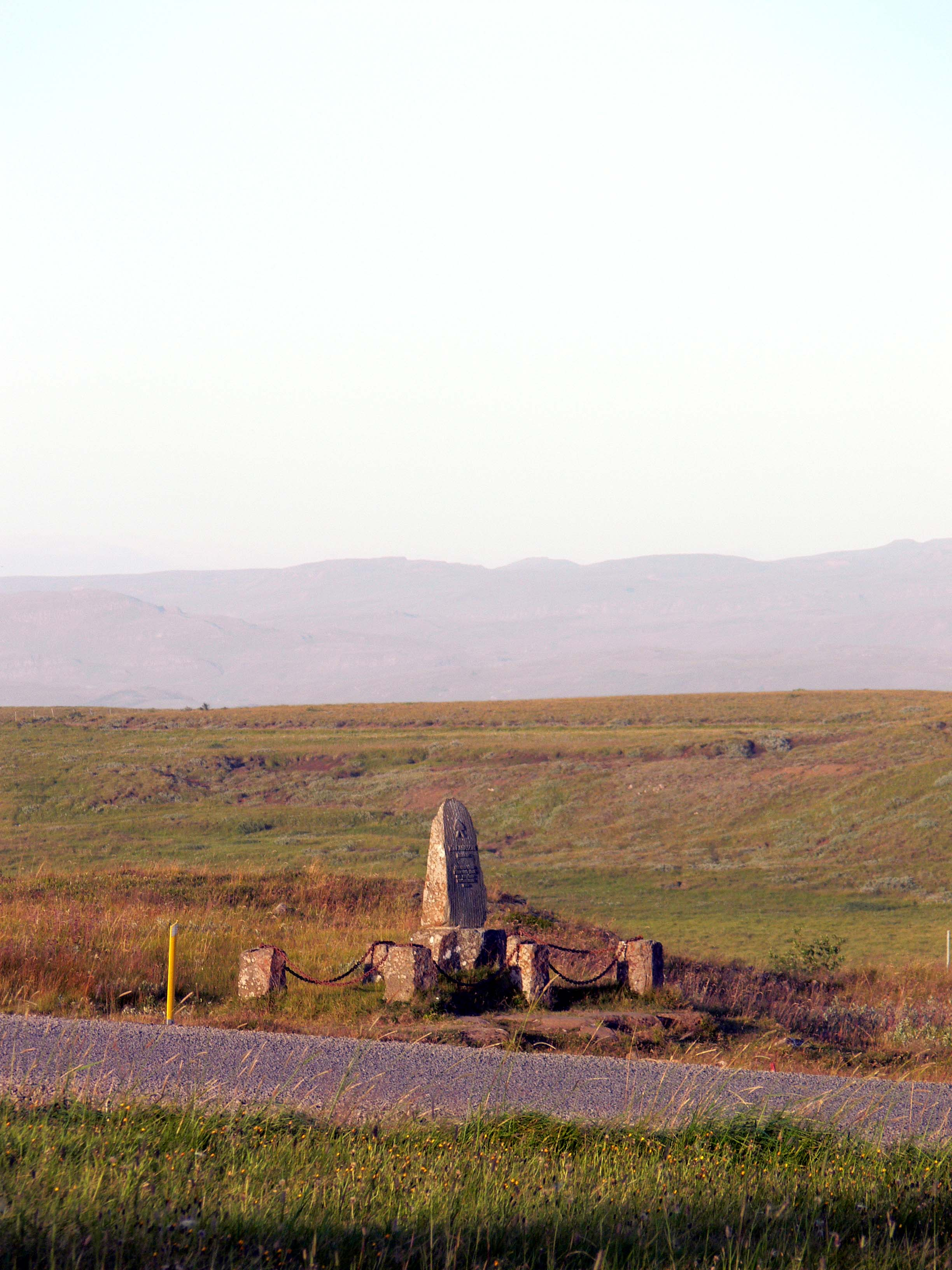
Memorial where poet and Roman Catholic Bishop Jón Arason was executed in Skalholt, south Iceland

Birth years link to the corresponding "[year] in poetry" article:

- February – Marcantonio Flaminio (born 1498), Italian, Latin-language poet
- June 2 – Guillaume Bigot (born 1502), French writer, doctor, humanist and poet in French and Latin
- June 12 – Cristobal de Castillejo (born c. 1490), Spanish
- June 13 – Veronica Gambara (born 1485), Italian poet, stateswoman and political leader
- November 7 – Jón Arason (born 1484), Icelandic Roman Catholic bishop and poet, executed
- Also:
  - Pir Sultan Abdal (born c. 1480), Ottoman Empire
  - Nicholas Bourbon (born 1503 or 1505), French court preceptor and poet
  - Gian Giorgio Trissino (born 1478), Italian Renaissance humanist, poet, dramatist, diplomat and grammarian

== See also ==
- Poetry
- 16th century in poetry
- 16th century in literature
- Dutch Renaissance and Golden Age literature
- French Renaissance literature
- Renaissance literature
- Spanish Renaissance literature
