= 1420s in poetry =

This article covers 1420s in poetry. Nationality words link to articles with information on the nation's poetry or literature (for instance, Irish or France).

== Works published ==
1425:

- Antonio Beccadelli, Hermaphroditus, a collection of 81 Latin epigrams
- Alain Chartier, La Belle Dame sans Merci; France

1429:

- Christine de Pisan, Le Ditie de Jehanne d'Arc, France

== Births ==
Death years link to the corresponding "[year] in poetry" article:

1420:

- Martial d'Auvergne, French poet
- Giovanni Mattia Tabarino, born about this year (died 1500), Italian, Latin-language poet
- Jean Meschinot (died 1491), French

1421:

- Sōgi 宗祇 (died 1502), Japanese Zen monk who studied waka and renga poetry, then became a professional renga poet in his 30s

1422:

- Anthony Woodville born about this year (died 1483), English poet and translator

1423:

- Alfonso de Palencia (died 1492), Castilian pre-Renaissance historian, writer, and poet

1424:

- Cristoforo Landino (died 1498), Italian, Latin-language poet
- Bonino Mombrizio (died 1482/1502), Italian, Latin-language poet
- Tito Vespasiano Strozzi born this year or in 1425 (died 1505), Italian, Latin-language poet

1425:

- Basinio da Parma (died 1457), Italian, Latin-language poet
- Tito Vespasiano Strozzi born this year or in 1424 (died 1505), Italian, Latin-language poet

1426:

- Suster Bertken born this year or 1427 (died 1514), Dutch
- Bhalam born about this year (died 1500), Indian, Gujarati-language poet
- Jalaladdin Davani (died 1502), Iranian philosopher, theologian, jurist and poet
- Giovanni Mario Filelfo (died 1480), Italian, Latin-language poet
- Olivier de la Marche (died 1501 or 1502), French poet and chronicler

1427:

- Suster Bertken born this year or 1426 (died 1514), Dutch
- Galeotto Marzio, born this year or 1428 (died 1494/1497), Italian, Latin-language poet
- Francesco Rolandello (died 1490), Italian, Latin-language poet

1428:

- Galeotto Marzio born this year or 1427 (died 1494/1497), Italian, Latin-language poet

1429:

- Giannantonio Campano (died 1477), Italian, Latin-language poet
- Giovanni Gioviano Pontano, also known as "Iovianus Pontanus" (died 1503), Italian, Latin-language poet
- Niccolò Perotti, also known as "Perotto" or "Nicolaus Perottus", born 1430 (died 1480), according to some sources, or this year, according to others, or either year, according to still others) Italian humanist, translator, author of one of the first modern Latin school grammars, and Latin-language poet

== Deaths ==
Birth years link to the corresponding "[year] in poetry" article:

1420:

- Giolla na Naomh Ó hUidhrín, Irish historian, topographer and poet

1423:

- Anselm Turmeda, also known as "Abd-Allah at-Tarjuman" عبد الله الترجمان (born 1355), a poet who wrote in both Catalan Spanish and, after converting to Islam, in Arabic
- Andrew of Wyntoun, also known as Andrew Wyntoun (born 1350), Scottish poet, a canon and prior
- Hugo von Montfort (born 1357), Austrian minstrel and representative of the German Minnesang (songwriters and poets)

1425:

- Jordi de Sant Jordi, died about this year (born late 1390s) Chamberlain at the court of King Alfons V of Aragon (Alfons III of Valencia), but better known for his poetry

1426:

- John Audelay, also spelled "John Awdelay", died about this year (birth year unknown), English priest and poet who wrote in a Staffordshire dialect of Middle English
- Süleyman Çelebi (born 1377), Turkish poet
- Thomas Hoccleve, died between March and May (born about 1368), English poet

== See also ==
- Poetry
- 15th century in poetry
- 15th century in literature
