= Spanisches Liederbuch (Wolf) =

Collection of 44 Lieder (songs for voice and piano) by Hugo Wolf

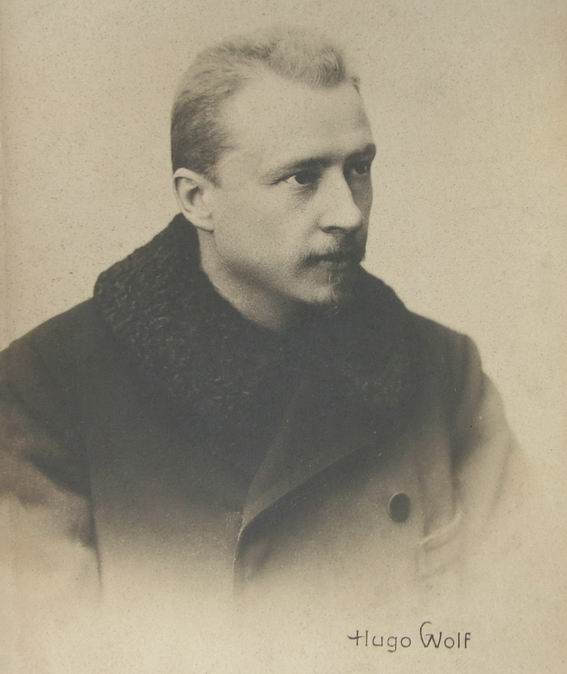
Hugo Wolf, 1885

Spanisches Liederbuch (English: Spanish songbook) is a collection of 44 Lieder (songs for voice and piano) by Hugo Wolf (1860–1903). They were composed between October 1889 and April 1890, and published in 1891. The words are translations into German by Emanuel Geibel (1815–84) and Paul Heyse (1830–1914) of Spanish and Portuguese poems and folk songs, published in a collection of 1852 also called Spanisches Liederbuch.

== Description ==
The collection is divided into two parts: 10 Geistliche Lieder (English: spiritual songs) and 34 Weltliche Lieder (English: secular or worldly songs). The Geistliche Lieder mostly relate to the Holy Family: Mary, Joseph, and Jesus. The Weltliche Lieder largely have erotic themes.

Wolf did not describe the set as a song cycle; though it has been recorded as such, with the songs divided between a male and a female singer; notably in 1966–67 by the baritone Dietrich Fischer-Dieskau, the soprano Elisabeth Schwarzkopf, and the accompanist Gerald Moore.

Wolf included an orchestrated version of "In dem Schatten meiner Locken" (Weltliche Lieder No. 2) in his comic opera Der Corregidor (1895).

"In dem Schatten meiner Locken" and "Nun wandre, Maria" (Geistliche Lieder No. 3) are among Wolf's best-known Lieder.

A complete performance takes about 1 hour 45 minutes.

== The poems ==
The German texts and some translations are available online at The LiederNet Archive:

- Geistliche Lieder
- Weltliche Lieder

The poems are listed below, with attributions to poet and translator where known. They are identified by their first lines. A few songs have a title; that is given in capital letters.

=== Geistliche Lieder ===
1. "Nun bin ich dein" (Juan Ruiz / Heyse)
2. "Die du Gott gebarst, du Reine" (Nicolas Nuñez / Heyse)
3. "Nun wandre, Maria" ("Der heilige Joseph singt") (Ocaña / Heyse)
4. "Die ihr schwebet um diese Palmen" (Lope de Vega / Geibel)
5. "Fuhr mich, Kind, nach Bethlehem!" (Anon. / Heyse)
6. "Ach, des Knaben Augen sind mir so schön und klar" (Francisco López de Úbeda / Heyse)
7. "Mühvoll komm' ich und beladen" (Don Manuel del Rio / Geibel(?))
8. "Ach, wie lang' die Seele schlummert!" (Anon. / Geibel)
9. "Herr, was trägt der Boden hier" (Anon. / Heyse)
10. "Wunden trägst du, mein Geliebter" (es:José de Valdivielso / Geibel)

=== Weltliche Lieder ===
1. "Klinge, klinge, mein Pandero" (Alvaro Fernandez de Almeida / Geibel)
2. "In dem Schatten meiner Locken" (Anon. / Heyse)
3. "Seltsam ist Juanas Weise" (Anon. / Geibel)
4. "Treibe nur mit Lieben Spott" (Anon. / Heyse)
5. "Auf dem grünen Balkon mein Mädchen schaut" (Anon. / Heyse)
6. "Wenn du zu den Blumen gehst" (Anon. / Heyse)
7. "Wer sein holdes Lieb verloren" (Anon. / Geibel)
8. "Ich fuhr über Meer, ich zog über Land" (Anon. / Heyse)
9. "Blindes Schauen, dunkle Leuchte" (Rodrigo Cota de Maguaque / Heyse)
10. "Eide, so die Liebe schwur" (Anon. / Heyse)
11. "Herz, verzage nicht geschwind" (Anon. / Heyse)
12. "Sagt, seid Ihr es, feiner Herr" (Anon. / Heyse)
13. "Mögen alle bösen Zungen immer sprechen, was beliebt" (Anon. / Geibel)
14. "Preciosas Sprüchlein gegen Kopfweh" ("Köpfchen, Köpfchen, nicht gewimmert", Miguel de Cervantes / Heyse)
15. "Sagt ihm, dass er zu mir komme" (Anon. / Heyse)
16. "Bitt' ihn, o Mutter, bitte den Knaben" (Anon. / Heyse)
17. "Liebe mir im Busen zündet einen Brand" (Anon. / Heyse)
18. "Schmerzliche Wonnen und wonnige Schmerzen" (Anon. / Geibel)
19. "Trau' nicht der Liebe, mein Liebster, gib acht!" (Anon. / Heyse)
20. "Ach, im Maien war's, im Maien" (Anon. / Heyse)
21. "Alle gingen, Herz, zur Ruh" (Anon. / Geibel)
22. "Dereinst, dereinst, Gedanke mein" (Cristobal de Castillejo / Geibel)
23. "Tief im Herzen trag' ich Pein" (Luís de Camões / Geibel
24. "Komm', o Tod, von Nacht umgeben" (Comendador Escriva / Geibel)
25. "Ob auch finstre Blicke glitten" (Anon. / Heyse)
26. "Bedeckt mich mit Blumen" (Maria Doceo(?) / Geibel)
27. "Und schläfst du, mein Madchen" (Gil Vicente / Geibel)
28. "Sie blasen zum Abmarsch" (Anon. / Heyse)
29. "Weint nicht, ihr Äuglein!" (Lope de Vega / Heyse)
30. "Limusinisch" ("Wer tat deinem Füßlein weh?", Anon. / Geibel)
31. "Deine Mutter, süsses Kind" (Don Luis el Chico / Heyse(?))
32. "Da nur Leid und Leidenschaft" (Anon. / Heyse)
33. "Wehe der, die mir verstrickte meinen Geliebten!" (Gil Vicente / Heyse)
34. "Geh', Geliebter, geh' jetzt!" (Anon. / Geibel)
