= Juan Ruiz =

14th-century Castilian poet

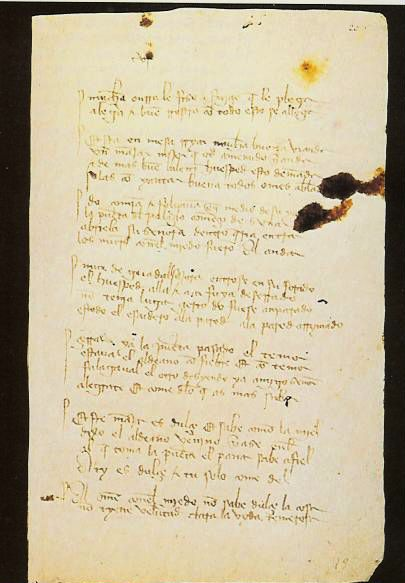
- Born: c. 1283
- Died: c. 1350
- Citizenship: Castile
- Occupations: Poet, cleric
- Writing career
- Period: Medieval Spanish
- Notable work: The Book of Good Love

Juan Ruiz (c. 1283 – c. 1350), known as the Archpriest of Hita (Arcipreste de Hita), was a medieval Castilian poet. He is best known for his ribald, earthy poem, El Libro de buen amor (The Book of Good Love).

== Biography ==
=== Origins ===
He was born in Alcalá de Henares. Little is known about him today, save that he was a cleric and probably studied in Toledo. Though his birth name is known to be Juan Ruiz, he is widely referred to by his title of "archpriest of Hita."

=== Imprisonment ===
According to his own book, he was imprisoned for years, thought to be between 1337 and 1350, as punishment for some of his deeds (if the poem is any guide, they were quite inconsistent with his position as priest). However, the poem has long been considered as pseudo-autobiography and the verses that mention his imprisonment appear at the end of the book and are generally thought to have been added after the fact. One of his poems states that he was imprisoned on the order of Gil Albornoz, the Archbishop of Toledo. It is not known whether he was sentenced for his irregularities of conduct, or on account of his satirical reflections on his ecclesiastical superiors. Nor is it possible to fix the precise date of his imprisonment. Albornoz nominally occupied the see of Toledo from 1337 to 1368, but he fell into disgrace in 1351 and fled to Avignon. A consideration of these circumstances points to the probable conclusion that Ruiz was in prison from 1337 to 1350, but this is conjecture. What seems established is that he finished the Libro de buen amor in 1343. Indeed, almost nothing is known about the author(s) of the poem or if he was even named Juan Ruiz. One scholarly study found hundreds of clerics in mid-fourteenth-century Castile named Juan Ruiz. The name appears to be the equivalent of John Smith and may have been chosen to represent the everyman.

=== Death ===
It has been estimated that he died around 1350 (presumably in prison); by 1351, he no longer held the title of archpriest of Hita.

== The Book of Good Love ==
El Libro de Buen Amor (The Book of Good Love) is a massive and episodic work that combines poems to Jesus and Mary; Ruiz's unrequited love, and fables. The poem itself is 1,728 stanzas long. The breadth of the writer's scope, and the exuberance of his style have caused some to term him "the Castilian Chaucer." Speculation regarding whether or not the book was actually an autobiography is incessant.

His language is characterized by its richness and its sermon-like tendency to repeat the same concept in several different ways. Noted for being very creative and alive, his work utilizes colloquial, popular vocabulary. His natural gifts were supplemented by his varied culture; he clearly had a considerable knowledge of the colloquial (and perhaps also of literary) Arabic widely spoken in the Spain of his time; his classical reading was apparently not extensive, but he knew by heart the Disticha of Dionysius Cato, and admits his indebtedness to Ovid and to the De Amore ascribed to Pamphilus; his references to Blanchefleur, to Tristan and to Yseult, indicate an acquaintance with French literature, and he utilizes the fabliaux with remarkable deftness; lastly, he adapts fables and apologues from Aesop, from Pedro Alfonso's Disciplina clericalis, and from medieval bestiaries. Ruiz, in fact, offers a complete picture of picaresque society in the most complex and rich cultural geography of Europe during the first half of the 14th century, and his impartial irony lends a deeper tone to his rich coloring.

In addition to the faculty of genial observation Ruiz has the gift of creating characters and presenting types of human nature: from his Don Furón is derived the hungry gentleman in Lazarillo de Tormes, in Don Melón and Doña Endrina he anticipates Calisto and Melibea in the Celestina, and Celestina herself is developed from the Trotaconventos of Ruiz. Moreover, Ruiz was justly proud of his metrical innovations: the Libro de buen amor is mainly written in the cuaderna via modelled on the French alexandrine, but he imparts to the measure a variety and rapidity previously unknown in Castilian, and he experiments by introducing internal rhymes or by shortening the fourth line into an octosyllabic verse; or he boldly recasts the form of the stanza, extending it to six or seven lines with alternate verses of eight and five syllables. But his technical skill never sinks to triviality.

Johan Ruys (original spelling), arcipreste de la Hita, was imprisoned by the Inquisition for a few years due to his one-sided love affair with a lady of the nobility. In our modern society, he would have been charged with "harassment". He is said to have died 7 or 8 years after his release from the Inquisition's holding facility.

There are today three manuscripts of the Libro de Buen Amor. The Salamanca version, denoted S, resides in Madrid's Biblioteca Real and is considered the best of the three codices. The other two are the Academia Española version, known as Gayoso (G), and the Toledo (T) manuscript.

== Legacy ==
Ruiz's influence is visible in El Corbacho, the work of another jovial goliard, Alphonso Martinez de Toledo, arch-priest of Talavera, who wrote more than half a century before the Libro de buen amor was imitated by the author of the Celestina. Ruiz is mentioned with respect by Santillana, and that his reputation extended beyond Spain is proved by the surviving fragments of a Portuguese version of the Libro de buen amor. By some strange accident he was neglected, and apparently forgotten, until 1790, when an expurgated edition of his poems was published by Tomás Antonio Sanchez; from that date his fame has steadily increased, and by the unanimous verdict of all competent judges he is now ranked as the greatest Castilian poet of his century.

Paul Heyse (1830–1914) published a translation into German of a poem by Ruiz in the 1852 collection Spanisches Liederbuch (Spanish Songbook), with the first line "Nun bin ich dein, du aller Blumen Blume". The translation was set to music for voice and piano by Hugo Wolf (1860–1903), and published in his 1891 Lieder collection also called Spanisches Liederbuch.
