= Gambara (disambiguation) =

Gambara is an Italian town and commune.

Gambara may also refer to:

== People ==
- Gambara (seeress), a legendary pagan priestess among the Lombards
- Carlo Antonio Gambara, Italian composer
- Gastone Gambara (1890-1962), Italian general
- Gianfrancesco Gambara (1533-1587), Italian cardinal
- Lattanzio Gambara (1530-1574), Italian painter
- Lorenzo Gambara (c 1496–1586), Italian priest
- Paola Gambara Costa (1463-1515), Italian nun
- Uberto Gambara (1489-1549), Italian cardinal
- Veronica Gambara (1485-1550), Italian noblewoman

== Other uses ==
- Gambara (Milan Metro), a metro station in Milan, Italy
- Gambara (short story), a short story by Honoré de Balzac
