= 1514 in poetry =

Nationality words link to articles with information on the nation's poetry or literature (for instance, Irish or France).

== Events ==
- Clément Marot presents Francis I of France his Judgment of Minos; appointed facteur de la reine ("queen's poet") to Queen Claude

== Works published ==
- Francesco Maria Molzo, The Aeneid translation from the Latin of Virgil into Italian, in consecutive unrhymed verse (forerunner of blank verse)

== Births ==
Death years link to the corresponding "[year] in poetry" article:

- Giorgio Cichino (died 1599), Italian, Latin-language poet
- Charles Fontaine (died 1588), French

== Deaths ==
Birth years link to the corresponding "[year] in poetry" article:

- Suster Bertken (born 1426 or 1427), Dutch
- Benedetto Cariteo (born 1450), Italian

== See also ==
- Poetry
- 16th century in poetry
- 16th century in literature
- French Renaissance literature
- Grands Rhétoriqueurs
- Renaissance literature
- Spanish Renaissance literature
