= 1505 in poetry =

This article covers 1505 in poetry. Nationality words link to articles with information on the nation's poetry or literature (for instance, Irish or Vietnam).

== Works published ==
=== Great Britain ===
- Anonymous, Adam bell, Clim of the Clough, and William of Cloudesly, an outlaw ballad, reprinted numerous times through the mid-17th century (a continuation, Young Cloudeslie, was published in 1608 in poetry)
- Anonymous, Octavian, publication year uncertain (1504–1506); written in the mid-14th century from a French version; among the many themes the work draws on are the St. Eustace legend and the "Calumniated Wife"
- Anonymous, Sir Torrent of Portingale, publication year uncertain; written in the late 14th to early 15th century
- Alexander Barclay, The Castell of Laboure, published anonymously; publication year uncertain, London: "Imprinted be ... Richarde Pynson", translation from the French of Pierre Gringoire

=== Other ===
- Jean Lemaire de Belges, Belgian Waloon poet writing in French:
  - La couronne margaritique (this year or 1504), on the death of Philibert II, Duke of Savoy, the second husband of Archduchess Margaret of Austria, to whom the author was court poet;
  - Epîtres de l'amant vert, mock epistles presented as having been written by the pet parrot of Marguerite d'Autriche; the parrot dies from its love for the woman; Walloon poet published in France, where he was court poet to d'Autriche
- Pietro Bembo, Gli Asolani, a dialogue on courtly love, with poems reminiscent of Boccaccio and Petrarch (see also second, revised edition 1530)

== Births ==
Death years link to the corresponding "[year] in poetry" article:

- February 4 – Mikolaj Rej (died 1569), Polish poet, politician and musician
- Also:
  - Lodovico Castelvetro born about this year (died 1571), Italian literary critic
  - Giovanni Pietro Astemio (died 1567), Italian, Latin-language poet
  - Nicholas Bourbon in this year or 1503 (died 1550), French court preceptor and poet
  - John Wedderburn, birth year uncertain (died 1556), Scottish religious reformer and poet
  - Nicholas Udall, born this year, according to one source, or in 1504, according to others (died 1556), English playwright, poet, cleric, pederast and schoolmaster
  - Georg Wickram (died 1562), German poet and novelist
  - Wu Cheng'en (died 1580), Chinese novelist and poet

== Deaths ==
Birth years link to the corresponding "[year] in poetry" article:

- July 17 – Filippo Beroaldo (born 1453), Italian writer, editor, translator, commentator and poet in Italian and Latin
- Also:
  - Tito Vespasiano Strozzi died about this year (born 1424), according to at least some sources, 1425 according to another, Italian, Latin-language poet
  - Robert Wydow (born 1446), English poet, church musician, and religious figure

== See also ==
- Poetry
- 16th century in poetry
- 16th century in literature
- French Renaissance literature
- Grands Rhétoriqueurs
- Renaissance literature
- Spanish Renaissance literature
