= Jean Lemaire de Belges =

Walloon poet, historian and pamphleteer

- Born: c. 1473; Belges, Wallonia (modern-day Belgium)
- Died: c. 1524
- Occupations: Poet, historian
- Writing career
- Language: French
- Notable work: Illustrations de Gaule et singularités de Troie
- Literary movement: French Renaissance

Jean Lemaire de Belges (c. 1473 – c. 1525) was a Walloon poet, historian, and pamphleteer who, writing in French, was the last and one of the best of the school of poetic 'rhétoriqueurs' (“rhetoricians”) and the chief forerunner, both in style and thought, of the Renaissance humanists in France and Flanders.

== Biography ==
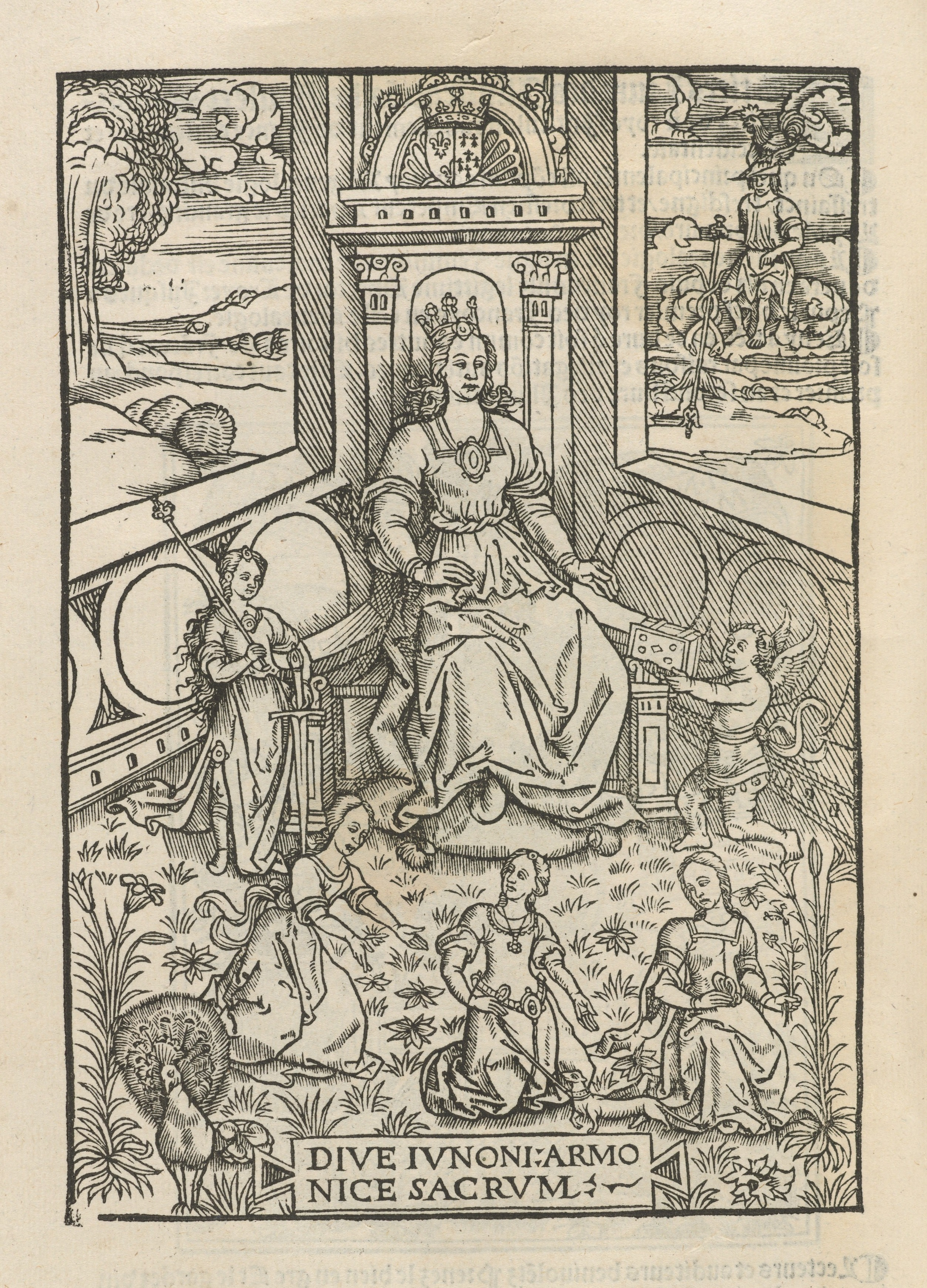
Page from Les illustrations de Gaule et sĩgularitez de Troye, 1512

Jean was born in Hainaut (Hainault), the godson and possibly a nephew of Jean Molinet, and spent some time with him at Valenciennes, where the elder writer held a kind of academy of poetry. In his first poems, Lemaire calls himself a disciple of Molinet. In certain aspects he does belong to the school of the grands rhétoriqueurs ("rhetoricians"), but his great merit as a poet is that he emancipated himself from the affectations of his masters. He perhaps owed this independence from the Flemish school in part to his studies at the University of Paris and to the study of the Italian poets at Lyon, a centre of the French Renaissance. In 1504 he was attached to the court of Margaret of Austria, Duchess of Savoy, and afterwards Regent of the Netherlands. For Margaret he undertook more than one mission to Rome, where he came into contact with the culture of the Italian Renaissance; he became her librarian and a canon of Valenciennes.

Jean's most original poems were addressed to Margaret: the burlesque Épîtres de l'amant vert, of 1505 (see 1505 in poetry). The amant vert (green lover) of the title is a green parrot belonging to his patroness. This latter piece was subsequently utilised in the sublimely melancholic Soubz ce tumbel (Within this tomb) by Pierre de la Rue. It is an intense elegiac farewell to Margaret's 'green lover'.

Within this tomb, which is a harsh, locked cell,

Lies the green lover, the very worthy slave
Whose noble heart, drunk with true, pure love,

Losing its lady, cannot bear to live.

Lemaire gradually became more French in his sympathies, eventually entering the service of Anne of Brittany, wife of Louis XII, and supporting Louis's ambitions to create a church relatively independent of the Pope. His prose Illustrations de Gaule et singularitez de Troye (1510–1514), largely adapted from Benoît de Sainte-Maure, is a novel-like history that connects the House of Burgundy with Hector.

Lemaire probably died before 1525. Étienne Pasquier, Pierre de Ronsard and Joachim du Bellay all acknowledged their indebtedness to him. In his love for antiquity, his sense of rhythm, and even the peculiarities of his vocabulary he anticipated the humanist movement led by Du Bellay and Ronsard, the Pléiade.

== Works ==
A 4-volume edition of his works, edited by Jean Stecher, was published in Leuven in 1882-1891.

=== Prose ===
- 1510–1514: Illustrations de Gaule et singularitez de Troye

=== Poetry ===
- 1504 or 1505: La courrone margaritique, on the death of Philibert II, Duke of Savoy, the second husband of Archduchess Margaret of Austria
- 1505: Épîtres de l'amant vert
- 1507: Les Chansons de Namur, written in support of a popular revolt
- 1511: La Concorde des deux langages, referring to the French and Italian languages, urging cultural unity

=== Epîtres de l'Amant vert ===
While a poet in residence at the court of Margaret of Austria, Jean wrote two rhymed letters extolling his patroness. The first epistle is a witty parody of the Ovidian farewell love letter, the second of the tradition of Virgil's Aeneid and Dante's Divine Comedy. The letters, written to defend the value of French poetry, were written around 1505, published around 1510-1511, and hide his own private subject under the guise of a green parrot.
