= Jean Stecher =

Belgian literary historian and literary critic

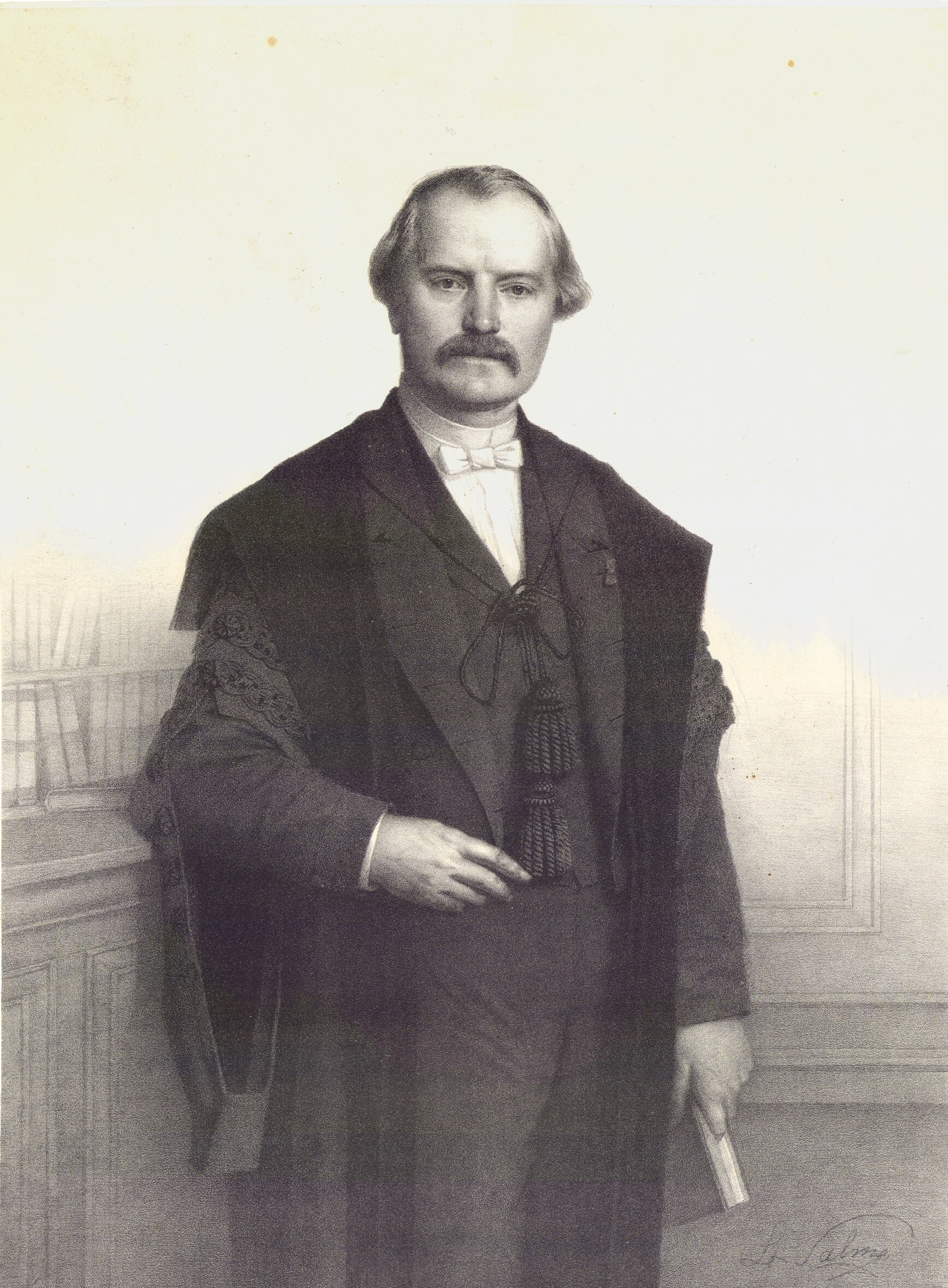
Lithograph portrait (1872)

Auguste Jean Stecher (1820–1909) was a Belgian literary historian and literary critic, sometimes writing under the pen name Lieven Everwyn, who was a professor at Ghent University and University of Liège and a contributor to the Biographie Nationale de Belgique. His magnum opus was a 4-volume edition of the works of Jean Lemaire de Belges.

== Life ==
Stecher was born in Ghent on 11 October 1820. His parents kept a hotel in the city. He studied at the state secondary school and the state university there, obtaining a doctorate in 1841. He began teaching at the University of Ghent, in 1850 transferring to the University of Liège.

He was elected a corresponding member of the Royal Academy of Science, Letters and Fine Arts of Belgium on 8 May 1876 and a full member on 9 May 1881.

Stecher died in Liège on 3 September 1909.

== Works ==
As author

- (as Lieven Everwyn), Korte levensschets van Jacob Van Artevelde (Ghent, 1845)
- (as Lieven Everwyn), De eerste Fransche Revolutie (Ghent, 1848)
- Flamands et Wallons (Liège, 1859)
- Étude sur les proverbes (Liège, 1861)
- Histoire de la Littérature néerlandaise en Belgique (Brussels, 1886)

As editor

- Oeuvres de Jean Lemaire de Belges (4 vols., Leuven, 1882-1891)

As translator

- Hendrik Conscience, La Guerre des Paysans (2 vols., Liège, 1853)

Articles

- "Le Drame réaliste au Moyen Age", Revue de Belgique, vol. 34 (1880)
