= 1504 in poetry =

Nationality words link to articles with information on the nation's poetry or literature (for instance, Irish or France).

== Events ==
- Jean Lemaire de Belges joins the court of Archduchess Margaret of Austria

== Works published ==
- Anonymous, Generides, publication year uncertain; written in the late 14th century; Great Britain
- Stephen Hawes, The Example of virtue, publication year uncertain; Great Britain
- Jean Lemaire de Belges, La couronne margaritique (this year or 1505), on the death of Philibert II, Duke of Savoy, the second husband of Archduchess Margaret of Austria, to whom the author was court poet; Belgian Waloon poet writing in French
- Hussain Vaeze Kashefi, Anvare Soheyli ("The Shining Star Canopus"), collection of verse fables, Persian
- Jacopo Sannazaro, Arcadia, prose and pastoral poetry, written 1480–1485, Italy
- Pierre Gringore, les Abus du monde, satire, France

== Births ==
Death years link to the corresponding "[year] in poetry" article:

- October 29 – Shin Saimdang (died 1551), Korean painter, poet, embroiderer, calligrapher, scholar of Confucian literature and history
- November – Giovanni Battista Giraldi, who gave himself the nickname "Cinthio", also rendered "Cynthius", "Cintio" or, in Italian, "Cinzio" (died 1573), Italian novelist and poet
- Nicholas Udall, born this year, according to some sources, or in 1505, according to another (died 1556), English playwright, poet, cleric, pederast and schoolmaster

== Deaths ==
Birth years link to the corresponding "[year] in poetry" article:

- Pandolfo Collenuccio (born 1444), Italian, Latin-language poet

== See also ==
- Poetry
- 16th century in poetry
- 16th century in literature
- French Renaissance literature
- Grands Rhétoriqueurs
- Renaissance literature
- Spanish Renaissance literature
