= Francesco Spiera =

Protestant Italian jurist (1502–1548)

Francesco Spiera (1502 – December 27, 1548) was a Protestant Italian jurist. The manner of his death has been the subject of numerous religious tracts.

== Life ==
He was born at Cittadella, 20 km (12 mi) north of Padua, then part of the Republic of Venice. Protestants of the early modern period used his case as an example of the dreadful consequences of the sin against the Holy Ghost: he discerned evangelical truth, but denied and abjured it for external reasons.

Spiera had a respected position in his native town and a fine house, in which ten children grew up. Besides the Scriptures, there fell into his hands various evangelical writings, such as The Benefit of Christ's Death, Doctrine Old and New, and Summary of Sacred Scripture, which instilled in him doubts about Roman Catholic teachings, such as those on purgatory and veneration of the saints.

With others he was arraigned before the Inquisition at Venice; his trial was held between May 24 and June 20, 1548. On the latter day, in St. Mark's Basilica, Spiera made solemn abjuration of his "errors", and subscribed the abjuration, which he then repeated on the following Sunday in Cittadella, after mass in the cathedral. On returning home, so he related it himself, "the Spirit", or the voice of his conscience, began to reproach him for having denied the truth. Over time, he felt more and more hopeless, which feeling so affected him physically that he was taken to Padua to be treated by physicians. The treatment was in vain, and the conflict, which Pier Paolo Vergerio and others witnessed, ended in his death, shortly after his return to his home.

That Spiera intentionally injured himself is later invention.
