= Lu Zhi (painter) =

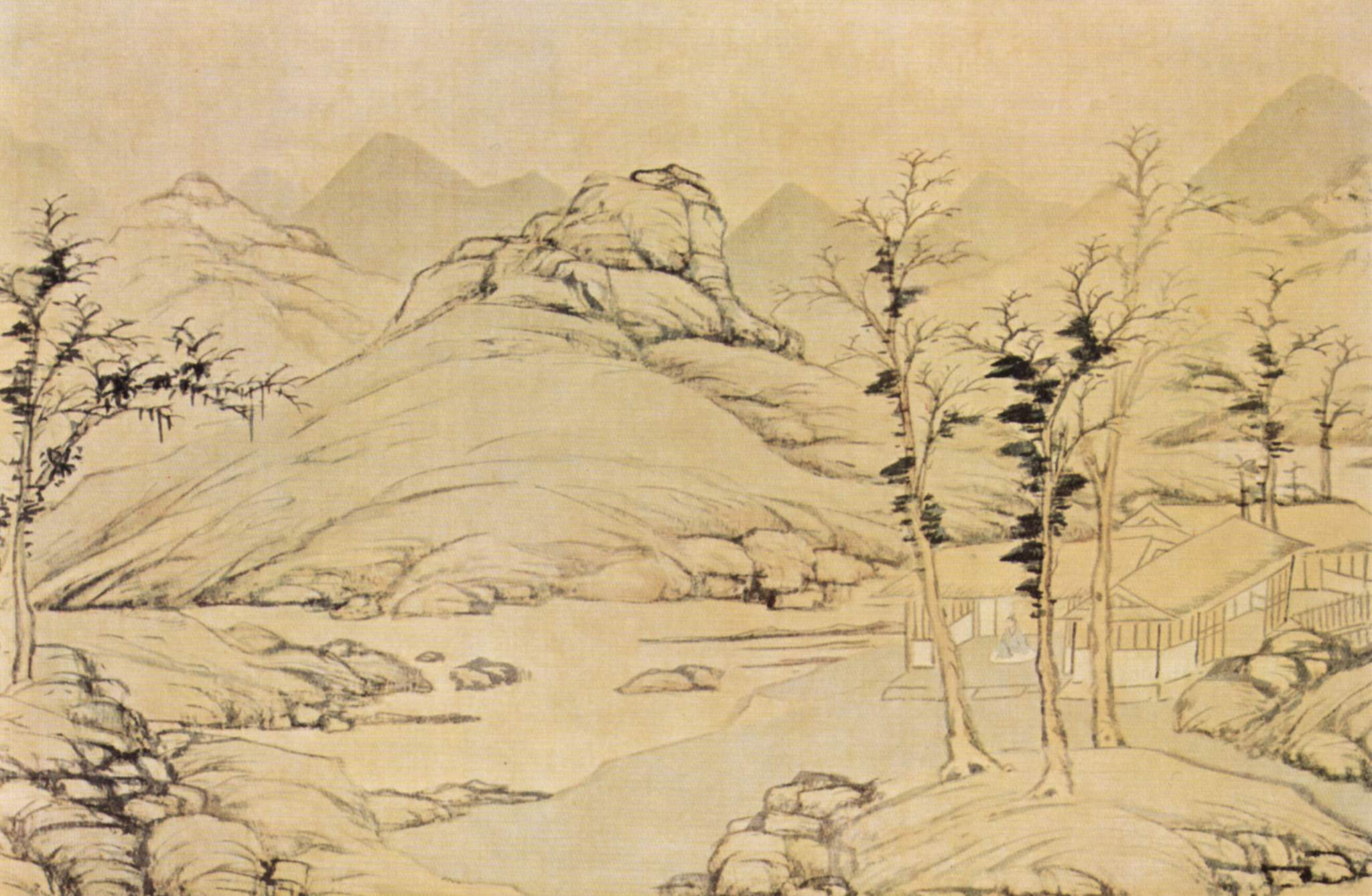
Lu Zhi, River Landscape in Spring , National Palace Museum, 1535

Lù Zhì, formerly romanized as Lu Chih (simplified Chinese: 陆治; traditional Chinese: 陸治; ca. 1496–1576), was a Chinese landscape painter, calligrapher, and poet during the Ming dynasty (1368–1644).

Lu was born in Suzhou, Jiangsu province. His style name was 'Shuqing' and his sobriquet was 'Bao Shanzi'. Lu's painting followed the style of Wen Zhengming. Lu specialized in both vertical and horizontal landscapes and bird-and-flower paintings.
