= Spanisches Liederbuch =

Spanisches Liederbuch (English: Spanish songbook) is a collection of translations of Spanish poems and folk songs into German by Emanuel Geibel (1815–84) and Paul Heyse (1830–1914). It was first published in 1852.

In 1852–53, the composer Johannes Brahms (1833–97) set "In dem Schatten meiner Locken" from the collection for voice and piano under the title "Spanisches Lied", published as his Op. 6 No. 1. In 1864 Brahms also set "Die ihr schwebet" based on Cantarcillo de la Virgen by the Spanish writer Lope de Vega (1562–1635) as Geistliches Wiegenlied, one of the Two Songs for Alto with Viola and Piano, Op. 91, published in 1884.

In 1891, the composer Hugo Wolf (1860–1903) published a collection of 44 Lieder (settings for voice and piano) on poems from the volume, also under the title Spanisches Liederbuch.
