= Jeronim Vidulić =

Croatian poet

- Born: around 1430; Zadar, Venetian Republic
- Died: 1499; Zadar, Venetian Republic
- Occupations: priest and notary
- Known for: recording one of the earliest Renaissance poems on Glagolitic script

Jeronim Vidulić (around 1430 – 1499 in Zadar) was a 15th-century Catholic priest and notary from Zadar, Venetian Dalmatia (today Croatia). He is best known for recording one of the earliest Petrarchist poems in Croatian, written using Glagolitic script.

== Biography ==
He lived in the 15th century in the city of Zadar. He belonged to civilian family. He was a priest, but has been also mentioned (1456) as a notary for the city and the county of Zadar. He died in 1499.

== Work ==
The only preserved - though in a bit damaged state - Vidulić's poem in Croatian, Ako mi ne daš lik, composed in six dodecasyllabic quatrains, is the proof of the existence of troubadour-Petrarchan school of poetry in the middle of 15th century in Zadar, beside the city of Dubrovnik. The poem was found written on one official document and, of course, it is not certain whether Vidulić was the author or just a scribe. Vidulić was also an educated humanist, used Glagolitic script, and was in a certain way a predecessor of Petar Zoranić.
