= Cristóbal de Virués =

Spanish dramatist and poet

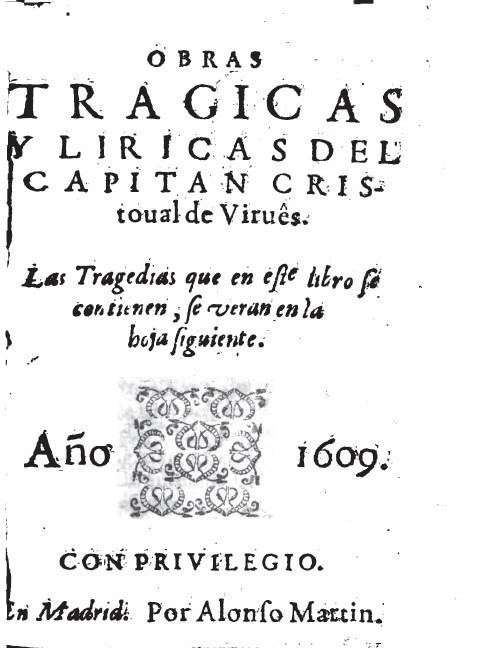
Obras trágicas y liricas (1609)

Cristóbal de Virués (c. 1550–1614) was a Spanish dramatist and poet.

He was born at Valencia about the middle of the 16th century, joined the army, fought at Lepanto, and retired to his birthplace with the rank of captain shortly before 1586.

The work for which he is best known is El Monserrate (1587), an epic about the legendary founding of the monastery at Monserrate. The poem was well received in its time and had the honor of being praised by Miguel de Cervantes, and of being reprinted in 1601. Shortly afterwards Virués returned to Italy and issued a recast of his poem entitled El Monserrate segundo (1602). By the twentieth century both epics and pious works began to fall from critical favor and since that time the work has been largely forgotten. His Obras trágicas y líricas (1609) include five tragedies: La Gran Semíramis, La Cruel Casandra, Atila furioso, La Infelice Marcela and Elisa Dido. The date of his death is unknown, but he is conjectured to have been alive as late as 1614.

Virués belongs to the school of dramatists displaced by Lope de Vega, and his methods were out of fashion before his plays were printed; yet he is an interesting figure, chiefly because of the very extravagances which destroy the effect of his best scenes.
