= Girolamo Muzio =

Italian philologist (1496-1576)

- Born: 12 March 1496; Padua, Republic of Venice
- Died: 1576 (aged 79–80); Barberino Val d'Elsa, Grand Duchy of Tuscany
- Other name: Mutio Justinopolitano
- Occupations: Courtier; Poet; Writer
- Parent(s): Cristoforo Nuzio and Lucia Nuzio

Girolamo Muzio or Mutio Justinopolitano (1496 in Padua, Republic of Venice – 1576 in Barberino Val d'Elsa, Grand Duchy of Tuscany) was an Italian author in defence of the vernacular Italian language against Latin.

== Biography ==
Girolamo Muzio was born at Padua in 1496, and educated there. He was honoured by Pope Leo X with the title of Cavalier; and he was in the service of the marquis del Vasto; after whose death he passed into the service of Don Ferdinando Gonzaga, whose affairs he managed at several Italian courts. The duke of Urbino next appointed him governor to his son, afterwards duke Francesco II. He was afterwards in the service of cardinal Ferdinando de' Medici. He died in 1576. In 1551 he published, along with other Italian poems, his Arte Poetica, in three books, composed in blank verse. Besides letters, histories, moral treatises, he wrote several tracts against the Reformers, especially those of the Italian nation, who at that time were numerous. He first attacked Vergerio. He then contended with Ochino, and Betti; and he afterwards assailed Bullinger, Viret, and others. As a counterbalance to the Protestant writers of ecclesiastical history, called the Magdeburg Centuriators, Muzio, in 1570, published a Roman Catholic history of the two first centuries, which made up in polemic zeal for what it wanted in sound erudition. Muzio's works on the Italian language, published as the Battaglie per diffesa dell'italica lingua (1582), include a defence of the vernacular against claims for the superiority of Latin, and the Varchina, in which Muzio attacks Benedetto Varchi's pro-Florentine Ercolano while upholding his own ideal of an Italian learned from books.

== Works ==
- Il duello (Venice, 1550)
- Il gentilhuomo (Venice, 1571)
- Battaglie per diffesa dell'italica lingua (1582)
- Poems for Tullia d’Aragona: Egloghe (1550)
- Treatise of poetry after Horace (1551)
- Against Claudio Tolomei (1533–1574)
- Vergeriane. Against Pier Paolo Vergerio. Venezia: Gabriele Giolito de' Ferrari. 1550.
- Le mentite ochiniane (1551) against Bernardino Ochino
- Lettere catholiche, vol I-IV (1571)
