= 1556 in poetry =

This article covers 1556 in poetry. Nationality words link to articles with information on the nation's poetry or literature (for instance, Irish or France).

== Works published ==
=== France ===
- Rémy Belleau:
  - Odes d'Anacréon, a translation into French
  - Petites Inventions
- Pierre de Ronsard, Les Hymnes (see also Hymnes 1555)

=== Great Britain ===
- Anonymous, The Knight of Courtesy and the Fair Lady of Faguell, publication year uncertain, composed in the late 14th century, based on 13th century French works
- Roger Bieston, published anonymously, although the author's name is revealed in an acrostic, The Bayte and Snare of Fortune, probably translated from the French version of an Italian original work
- John Heywood, The Spider and the Flie. A parable of the Spider and the Flie, made by John Heywood, verse allegory the author's most ambitious work but critics and historians have long dismissed it as awful.

== Births ==
Death years link to the corresponding "[year] in poetry" article:

- March 7 – Guillaume du Vair (died 1621), French writer and poet
- April 27 – François Béroalde de Verville (died 1626), French novelist and poet
- August 10 – Philipp Nicolai (died 1608), German poet and composer
- November 25 – Jacques Du Perron (died 1618), French
- date unknown – Trajano Boccalini (died 1613), Italian satirical poet
- date unknown – Abdul Rahim Khan-I-Khana (died 1627), Indian poet in Mughal Emperor Akbar court

== Deaths ==
Birth years link to the corresponding "[year] in poetry" article:

- April 18 – Luigi Alamanni sometimes spelled "Luigi Alemanni" (born c. 1495), Italian poet and statesman
- October 21 – Pietro Aretino (born 1492), Italian
- November 14 – Giovanni della Casa (born 1503)
- Also:
  - Fuzûlî (فضولی) (born c. 1483), Ottoman Empire
  - Sebestyén Tinódi Lantos (born 1510), Hungarian lyricist, epic poet, political historian, and minstrel
  - Nicholas Udall (born 1510 or in 1505), English playwright, poet, cleric, pederast and schoolmaster
  - Thomas Vaux, second Baron Vaux of Harrowden (born 1510), English
  - John Wedderburn (born 1505), Scottish religious reformer and poet

== See also ==
- Poetry
- 16th century in poetry
