= Suster Bertken =

Dutch poet and hermit

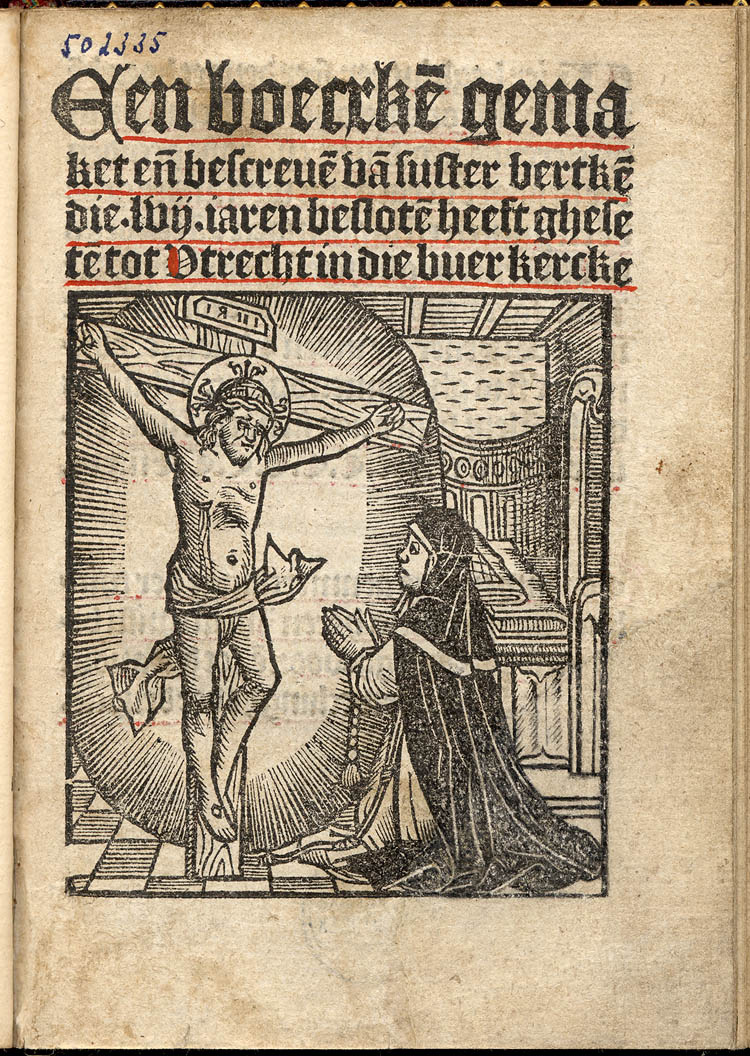
A posthumous publication of Suster Bertkens's religious text, entitled in translation A booklet written by Suster Bertkens who for 57 years was enclosed in the Buurkerk at Utrecht, 1516.

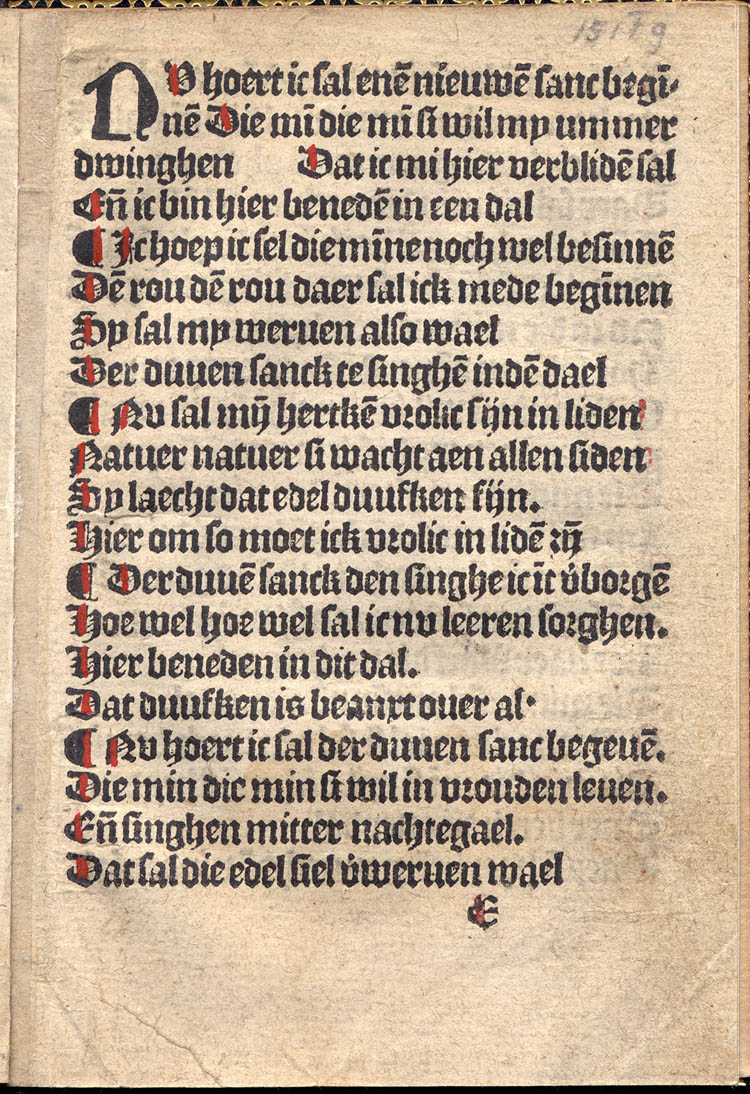
Suster Bertken: Nu hoert ic sal enen nieuwen sanc beginnen, poem, 1516. "Now listen up, i'll start a new song".

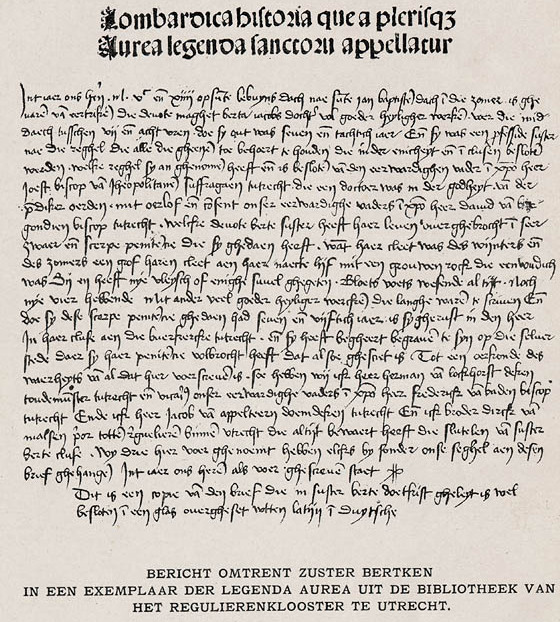
Manuscript biography of Suster Bertken, Regulierenklooster (Monastery of the Canons regular), Utrecht. Before 1700.

Suster Bertken ('Sister Bertie'; 1426 – 25 June 1514) was a Dutch poet and anchorite.

== Biography ==
She was born the illegitimate daughter of the canon priest Jacob van Lichtenberg. Her life before her enclosure as an anchorite is unknown, but she was evidently given a good education. In 1456 or 1457, she let herself be enclosed in a cell as an anchorite at the Buurkerk in Utrecht with permission by Utrecht bishop David of Burgundy.

According to a description of her life, she lived an extremely ascetic life even for an anchorite. After her death, several songs and hymns written by her were found among her belongings and were published in 1516. Her songs describe foremost her passion in the mystical union with God and became popular. She is one of few medieval women included in the Dutch literary canon.

Bertken lived in a small cell adjacent to the Buurkerk church of Utrecht for fifty-seven years until her death in 1514. Her daily activities were attending church from a window in her cell, meditation, prayer and writing. The only furniture in the cell was a chair, desk and mattress. Bertken never wore shoes and her diet excluded all dairy and meat products.

She died on 25 June 1514.

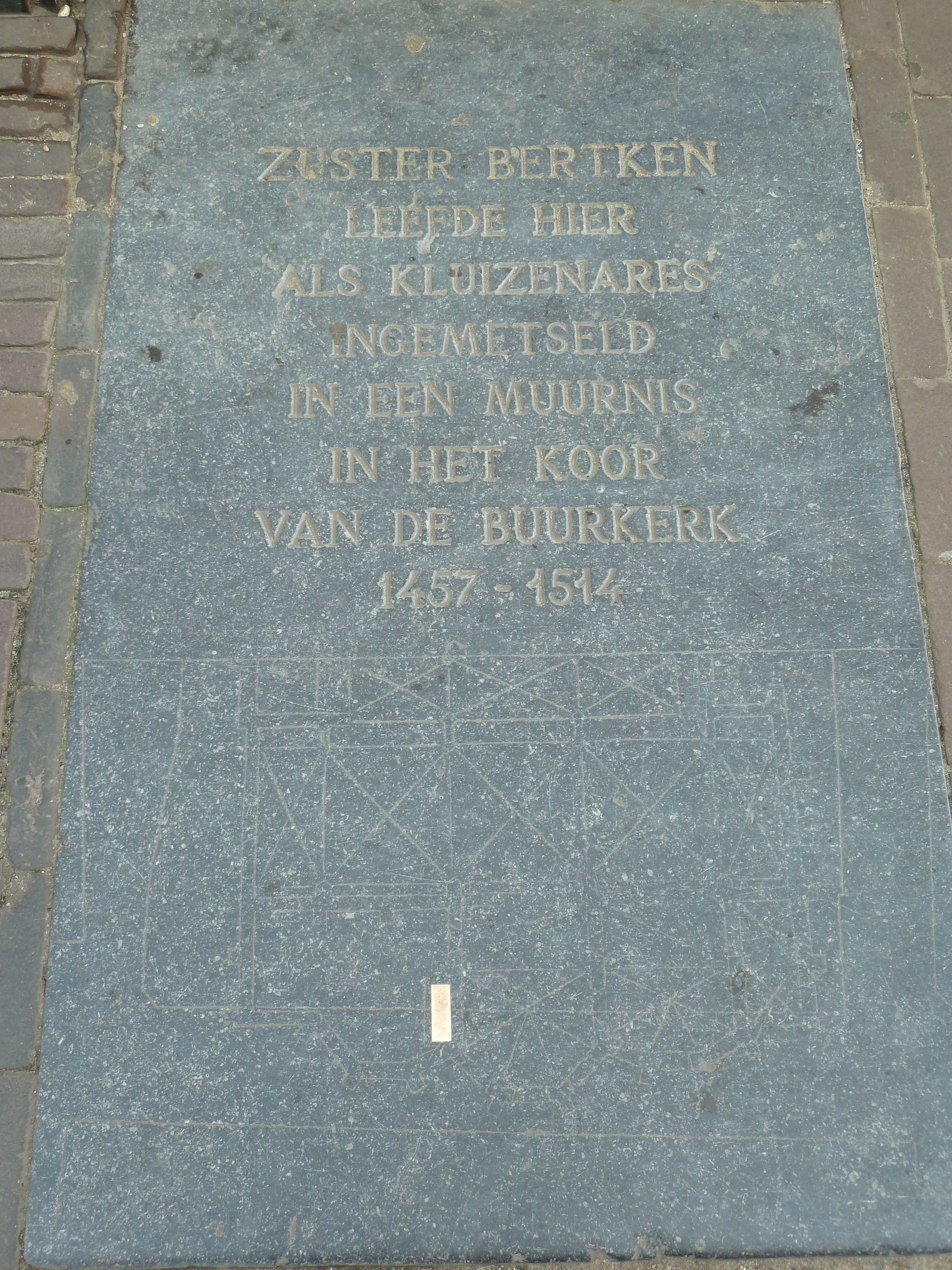
Memorial stone for Suster Bertken near her demolished cell with a map indicating the location in the Buurkerk church. Choorstraat, Utrecht, the Netherlands.

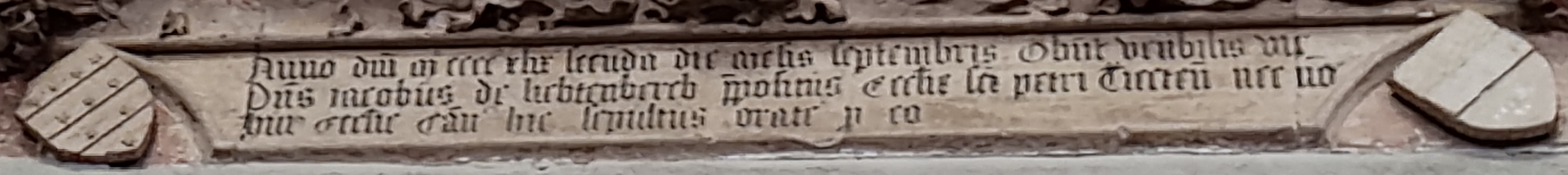
Epitaph for the Provost and Canon Jacob van Lichtenberg (1384–-1449), illegitimate father of Suster Bertken, in the Utrecht Domkerk, 2023. Click to enlarge.

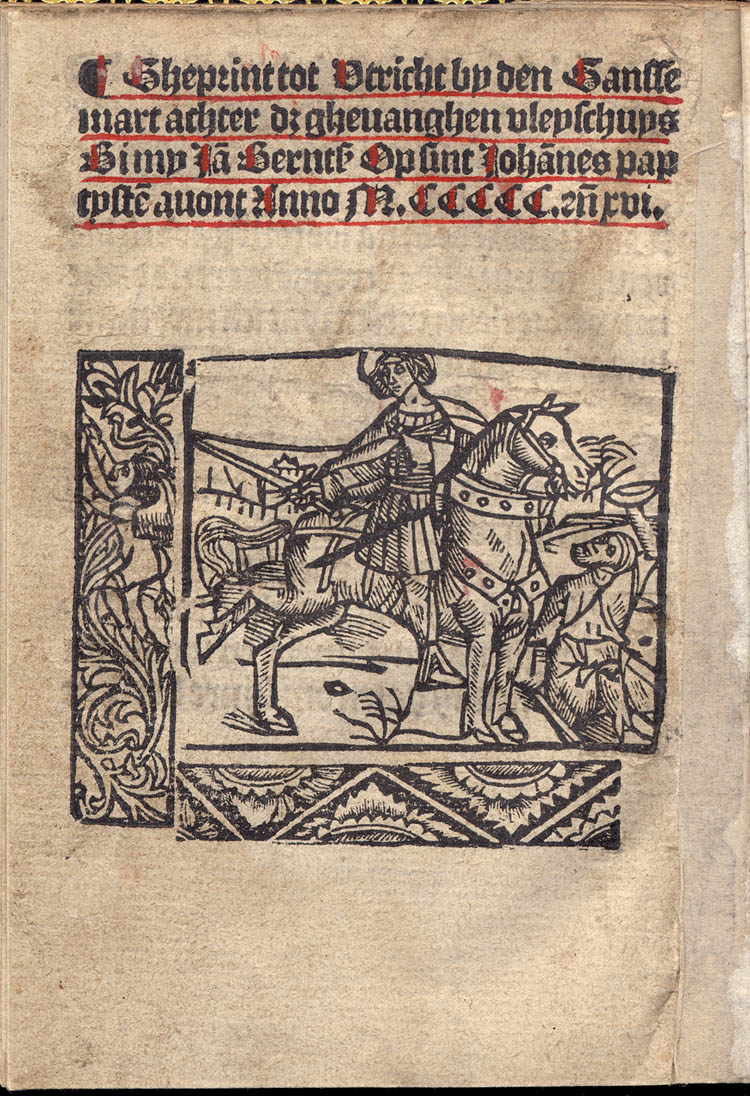
Suster Bertken: Boeck tracterende van desen puncten. Text with woodcut, 1516.

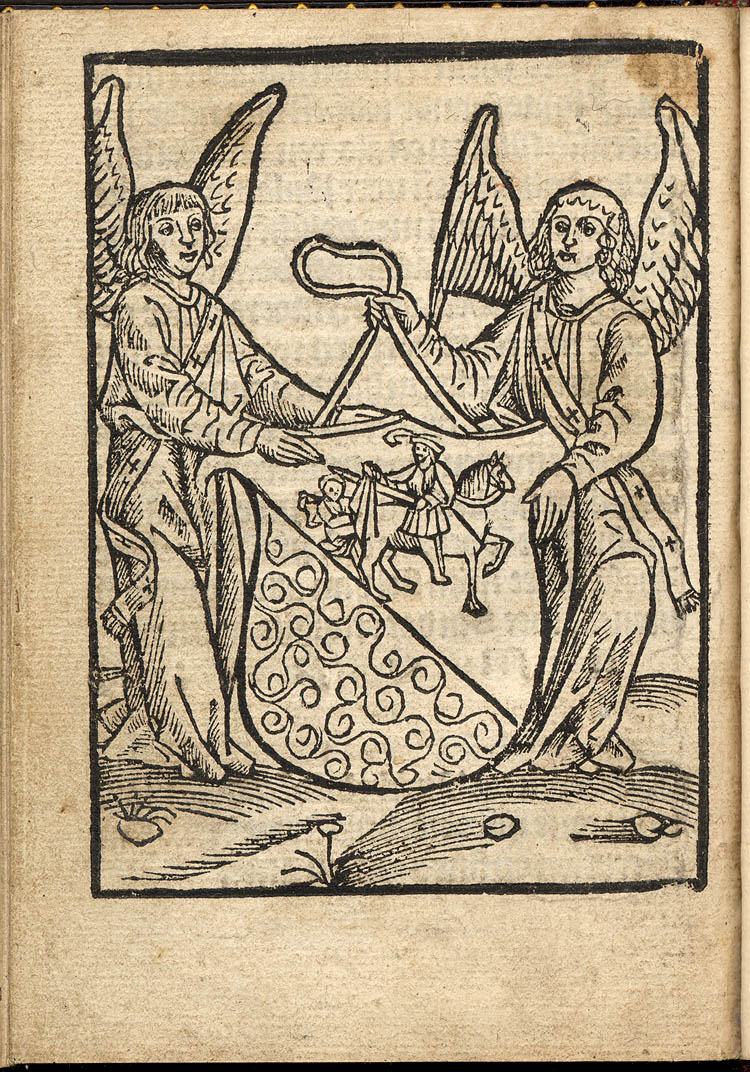
Suster Bertken: Een boecxken van die passie ons liefs heeren. Woodcut, 1516.

== Citation ==
- Een ander goet leydeken
Nu hoert ic sal enen nieuwen sanc begin-
nen Die min die min si wil my ummer
dwinghen Dat ic my hier verbliden sal
Ende ic bin hier beneden in een dal

Ic hoep ic sel di minne noch wel besinnen
Den rou den rou daer sal ick mede beginnen
Sy sal my werven also wael
Der duven sanck te singhen inden dael

.....

—Suster Bertken, Een boecxken .., 1516.

- Another good ditty
Now listen up, I'll start a new song
The love the love will always force me
That I'll rejoice here
And I'm down here in a valley

I hope I'll still fully grasp the love
The mourning the mourning I'll start with that
She [the love]'ll recruit me anyway
The pigeon's song to sing in the valley

.....

== Work ==
- Een boecxken gemaket ende bescreven van suster Bertken die LVII iaren besloten heeft gheseten tot Utrecht in die buerkercke, 1516, containing
  - Het boecxken van dye passie (Hier begint een seer devoet boecxken van die passie ons liefs heeren Jhesu Christi tracterende), meditations on the passion of Christ.
  - Suster Bertkens boeck tractierende van desen puncten, prayers, an essay on Christmas Eve, a dialogue between a faithful soul and Christ her bridegroom and eight songs of literary value.
- Mi quam een schoon geluit in mijn oren. Het werk van Suster Bertken. Republished and explained by José van Aelst, Fons van Buuren and Annemeike Tan (Hilversum, Uitgeverij Verloren, 2007). ISBN 978-90-6550-966-6. Collected work with extensive notes.

== In music ==
Suster Bertken is the subject of the opera Suster Bertken (2010) by Dutch composer Rob Zuidam (born 1964).
