= Rodrigo Cota de Maguaque =

Spanish poet (f. 15th century)

Rodrigo Cota de Maguaque (died c. 1498), Spanish poet, who flourished towards the end of the 15th century, was born at Toledo.

== Life ==
Little is known of him save that he was of Jewish origin. The Coplas de Migo Revulgo, the Coplas del Provincial, and the first act of La Celestina have been ascribed to him on insufficient grounds.

He is undoubtedly the author of the Diálogo entre el amor y un viejo, a striking dramatic poem first printed in the Cancionero general of 1511, and of a burlesque epithalamium written in 1472 or later. He abjured Judaism about the year 1497, and is believed to have died shortly afterwards.

== See ==
- Épithalame burlesque, edited by Raymond Foulché-Delbosc, in the Revue hispanique (Paris, 1894), i. 69-72
- Adolfo Bonilla y San Martín, Anales de la literatura española (Madrid, 1904), pp. 164–167.
