= Guillaume Bigot =

French writer and doctor (1502 – c. 1550)

Guillaume Bigot (French: [ɡijom biɡo]; 2 June 1502 – c. 1550) was a writer, doctor, humanist, and poet in French and Latin. His Christianae philosophiae Praeludium (Prelude to Christian Philosophy) was published in Toulouse in 1549. Its four books are devoted to the physiology of the human body, and to different aspects of the soul. It has a long preface, addressed to Cardinal Jean du Bellay, in which Bigot defends himself against his detractors.
