= Galeotto Marzio =

Italian astrologer

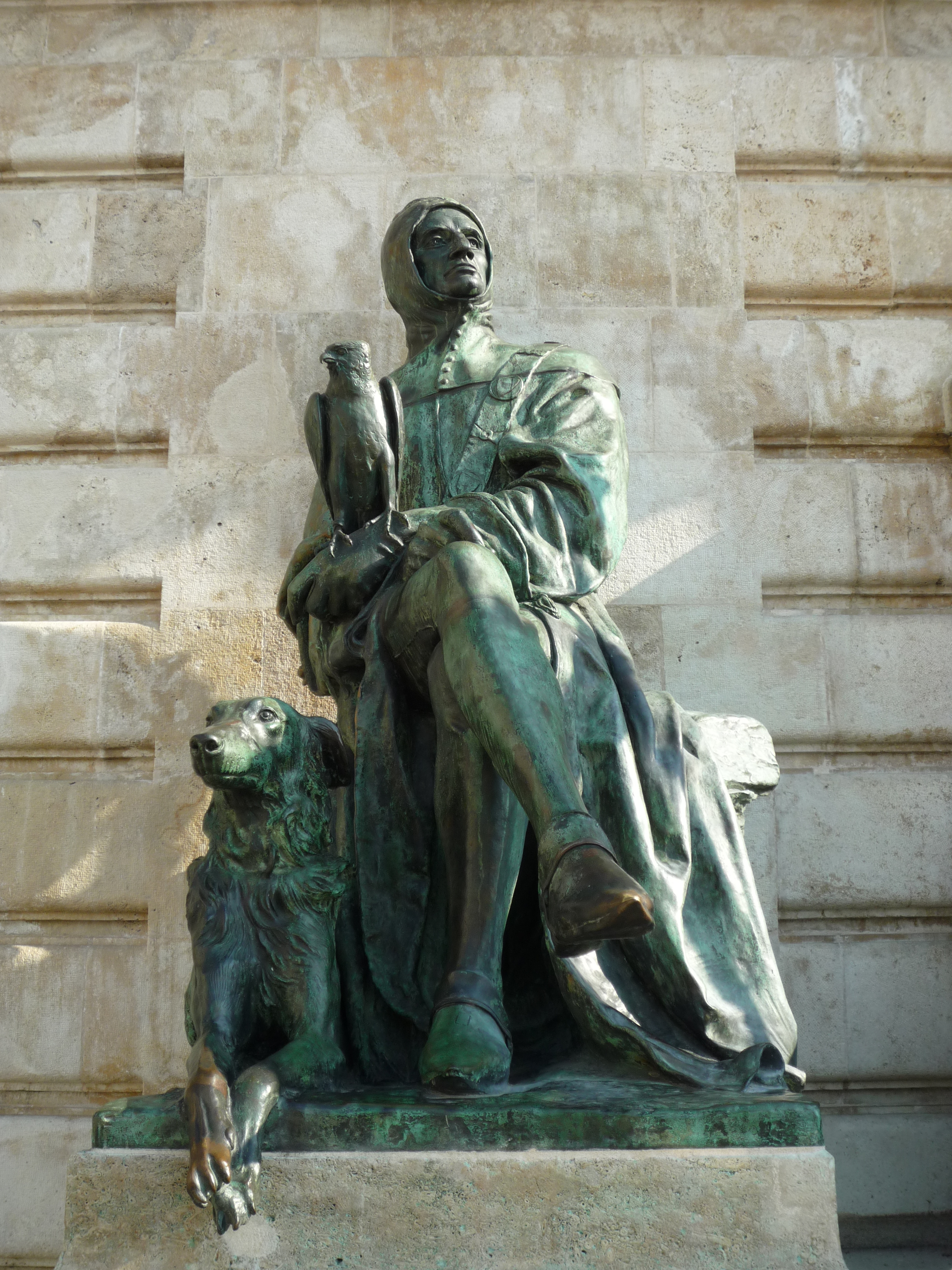
Statue of Galeotto in Budapest

Galeotto Marzio (c. 1424 – 1497) was an Italian humanist, poet, philosopher and astrologer who was active in Bohemia and Hungary.

== Life ==
Galeotto was born in Narni around 1424. He studied the classics from his early youth. After serving as a soldier for a short period, in 1447 he became a pupil of Guarino Veronese in Ferrara. Here he became an intimate friend of Janus Pannonius, who was a Hungarian student there. From Pannonius, Galeotto learned the Greek language. After a pilgrimage to Rome, Galeotto gave lectures in 1450 at the University of Padua about classical authors, and there he studied medicine as well. In Padua he married a Venetian (or, according to some sources, Lombard) girl. She was a daughter of Bartolomeo di Montagna. They had a son, Giovanni, and several daughters. After the death of his Italian wife he married a Hungarian noblewoman whose family name was Szepessy.

In March 1461, Galeotto was in Hungary (probably in Buda) together with his family, in the company of Janus Pannonius. After a short-term stay in Padua, in 1462 he spent a longer time travelling in Spain, France and England, practising medicine. During his journey he made friends and earned a considerable amount of money. In 1464, he was professor of Latin at the University of Bologna. Here Galeotto had an intensive polemical exchange with Francesco Filelfo.

In 1468 Janus Pannonius, who at that time was on a mission in Italy, took Galeotto back with him to Hungary. Galeotto spent a long time in the court of King Matthias Corvinus where the king soon took a liking to him. Galeotto became a confidant, companion and court historian of King Matthias. However, there are no reliable sources stating that Galeotto was the king's tutor or that of the king's son, John Corvinus.

Galeotto accompanied King Matthias on his campaign to Bohemia against the Czech King George Podiebrad. From 1473 to 1477, he gave lectures in Bologna about humanistic studies. He wrote between 1476 and 1478 a book of the title De incognitis vulgo, which expressed universal salvation—the heretical view that all men, who live according to common sense and the laws of nature, will find salvation. For this he was arrested by the Venetian Inquisition on his estate in Montagna near Padua, and they had him before the court. His property was confiscated, his wife was also put to prison, he was put on the pillory on the market of Venice, his book was burned, and he was forced to publicly recant his "diabolical" doctrines. He was in prison for 6 months, on dry bread and cold water. Pope Sixtus IV summoned him to Rome on the intervention of Lorenzo di Medici and King Matthias. There he was cleared of the charge of heresy and even regained his properties.

In 1479, Galeotto spent some time in the court of King Matthias, but soon returned to Italy. In 1482, he asked King Matthias for an engagement present for his daughters in Baden near Vienna, and received it. He died in Bohemia in 1497.

== Works ==
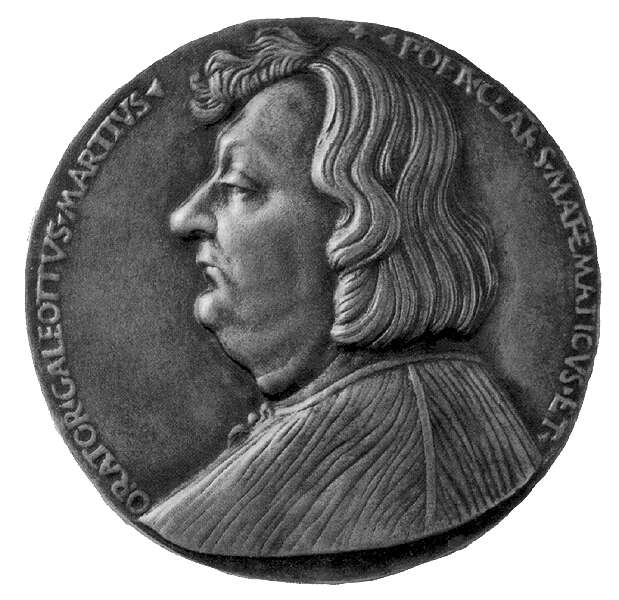
Medallion of Galeotto

In his two-volume book De Homine, Galeotto reflects on the physical and philosophic aspects of human nature and his main concern is the well-being of man. The first volume reflects on the external aspects of the human body whereas the second discusses the nature of some diseases and the internal aspects of the human organism.

In 1471, Galeotto wrote a book in Buda of the title De homine libri duo about physiology and medicine, a description of the parts of the body. This book was dedicated to Archbishop John Vitéz, who was the uncle of Janus Pannonius. From 1484 to 1487, supposedly in Italy, he wrote his book of the title De egregie, sapienter et iocose dictis ac factis Matthiae regis ('about the excellent, sapient and ingenious sayings and deeds of King Matthias'), first published by Sigismund Tordai in 1563. It was translated into Hungarian in the 19th century by Gabor Kazinczy and Ferdinand Barna. This work contains many interesting data relating to the history of culture in Hungary, anecdotes and characteristic stories about King Matthias and his court. The book was dedicated to Prince John Corvinus, son of King Matthias.

Galeotto dedicated one of his books, De promiscua doctrina, to Lorenzo di Medici. In 1492, he dedicated De Excellentibus to King Charles VIII of France, in whose court he spent some time after the death of King Matthias in 1490. This was a somewhat abridged and revised version of another of De promiscua doctrina.

His work De incognitis vulgo, which was dedicated to King Matthias, has been published partially in 1948 by Mario Frezza.

As Martius Galeotti, he appears in Sir Walter Scott's story of medieval France, Quentin Durward.
