= Lorenzo Gambara =

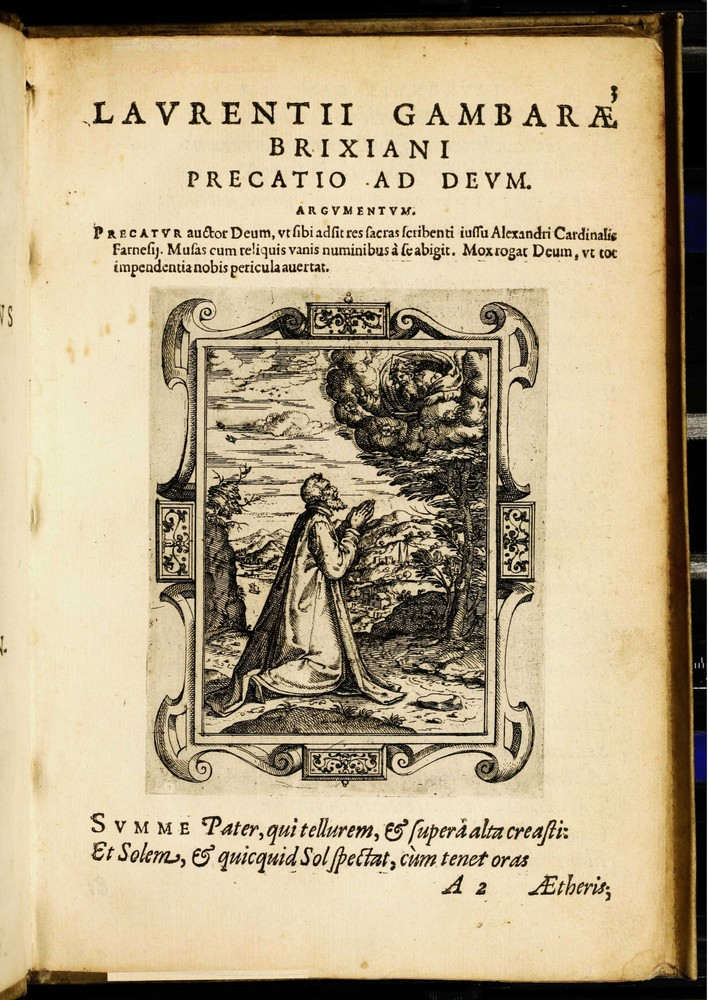
Laurentii Gambarae Brixiani. Precatio ad Deum, 3rd page of Rerum Sacrarum Liber, Antwerp, ex oficina Christophori Plantini, Antwerp, 1577.

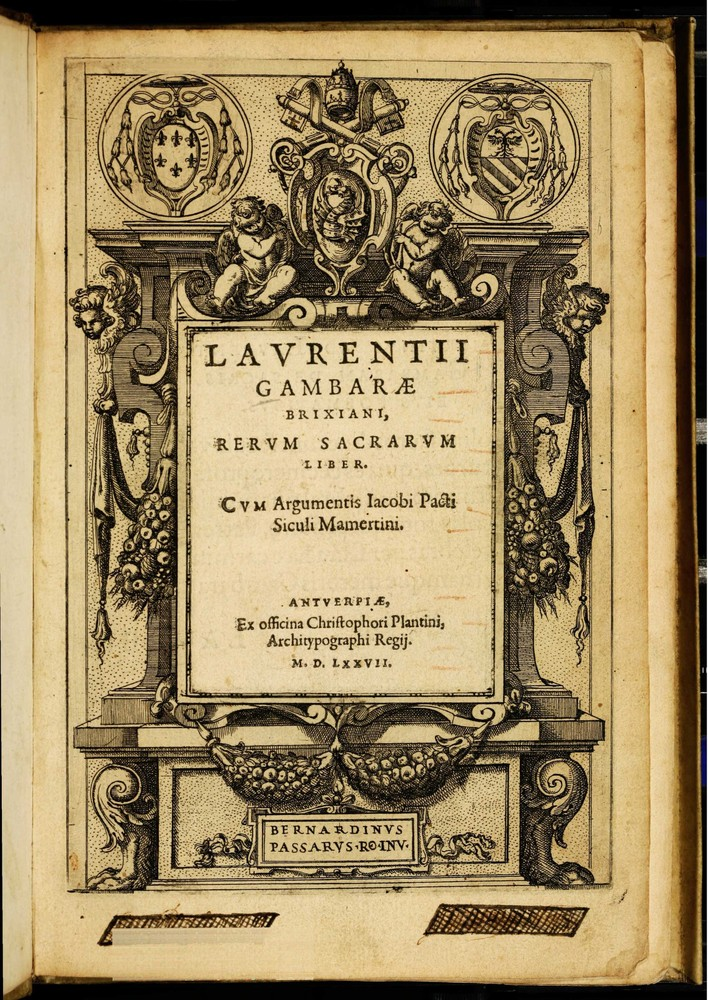
Front page of Rerum sacrarum liber, by Gambara printed in Antwerp by Christophe Plantin, 1577. Engravings signed by Bernardino Passeri

Lorenzo Gambara (Brescia, c. 1496-Rome, 1586) was a Renaissance priest, author and poet, publishing in Latin.

== Biography ==
Son of Giovanni Francesco Gambara, count of Pralboino and ambassador to the papacy of Leo X. Lorenzo studied in Padua and was ordained priest. He lived mostly in Rome. Among his patrons was Cardinal Antoine Perrenot de Granvelle, to whom he dedicated his epic poem in Latin De navigatione Christophori Columbi libri quattuor, that is the Four books of the travels of Columbus. It is possible that the father of Antonio, Nicholas Perrenot de Granvelle, ordered the work in 1535, when the Holy Roman Emperor Charles V returned from his Siege of Tunis, although publication was delayed until 1581.

A collection of sacred poetry Rerum sacrarum liber, was published in Antwerp in 1577. he also published an Anthology of Ancient Greek poetry translated to Latin: Carmina novem illustrium feminarum dedicated to Cardinal Alessandro Farnese.
