= Bonino Mombrizio =

Italian philologist, humanist and editor of ancient writings

Bonino Mombrizio (Mombritius) (1424 - between 1482 and 1502, perhaps 1500) was an Italian philologist, humanist, and editor of ancient writings. He was also a lawyer and a bureaucrat and the father of four daughters.

== Biography ==
Mombrizio was descended from a noble but not very wealthy family of Milan, and studied the Latin and Greek classics at Ferrara. Later he became a teacher of Latin at Milan, and was highly esteemed, not only for his extensive knowledge and his literary works, but also for his earnest religious life, as may be gleaned from the letters of his contemporaries. He suffered many misfortunes, which, however, did not affect his industry.

Mombrizio produced a number of editions of ancient writings, including:

- Chronica Eusebii, Hieronymi, Prosperi et Matthæi Palmerii (Milan, 1475)
- Scriptores rei Augustæ (1475)
- Papiæ Glossarium (1476)
- Mirabilia mundi of Solinus (place and date unknown)

A very notable contribution to hagiography is Mombrizio's collection of records of the martyrdom and lives of saints, which appeared under the title: Sanctuarium seu vitæ Sanctorum, probably printed in 1480, and edited in 1910 by the Benedictines of Solesmes Abbey.

Mombrizio also composed poems, some of which were published in his editions of the ancient writings, and some printed separately. Of the latter may be particularly mentioned De passione Domini.
