= Cristóbal de Castillejo =

Spanish poet (1491–1556)

Cristóbal de Castillejo (1491 – June 12, 1556) was a Spanish poet, a contemporary of Garcilaso de la Vega and Juan Boscán, who championed the use of traditional forms of Spanish poetry and criticized the use of Italianate forms such as the sonnet.

Some of his work consisted of translations of older work, in particular the 1st century BC Roman poet Catullus's "A Lesbia" as "Dame amor, besos sin cuento" (Seen side-by-side at this webpage). He also wrote plays, which are lost.

== Life ==
At fifteen he was taken to the Court of Ferdinand the Catholic, where he served as a page to Archduke Ferdinand of Habsburg, grandson of the king and the younger brother of Emperor Charles V. In this period he entered the Cistercian convent of San Martin de Valdeiglesias. In 1525, he left his retirement to take over the secretariat of its former master, who in 1526 became king of Hungary, the year after King of Bohemia, and who in 1531 would accede to the German crown with the title of King of the Romans as imperial lieutenant of his brother. He traveled throughout Europe.

In Vienna, though a monk, he led a dissolute life and had an affair and an illegitimate child. He fell on hard times because he wasted all the benefits and privileges that their positions gave him. He fell in love with a young German lady, Anne of Schaumburg, and dedicated his Historia de Píramo y Tisbe to her. She left him for a Bohemian noble, but apparently he also pursued Anne of Aragon after he lost hope of ever returning to Spain, evoking a famous account romance:

Tiempo es ya, Castillejo,
tiempo es de andar aquí

Translation:

it is time, Castillejo,
is time to walk here.

Disillusioned, he retired to a convent in Vienna, where he died in poverty. He is buried in Wiener Neustadt.

== Sources ==
- Chisholm, Hugh, ed. (1911). "Castillejo, Cristóbal de" . Encyclopædia Britannica. Vol. 5 (11th ed.). Cambridge University Press. p. 476.
- Fuentes, Ventura (1908). "Cristóbal de Castillejo" . In Herbermann, Charles (ed.). Catholic Encyclopedia. Vol. 3. New York: Robert Appleton Company.

== Literature ==
- Reyes Cano, Rogelio. Estudios sobre Cristóbal de Castillejo: tradición y modernidad en la encrucijada poética del siglo XVI. Ediciones Universidad de Salamanca. Salamanca, 2000. ISBN 84-7800-907-8.
