= 14th century in literature =

This article is a list of literary events and publications in the 14th century.

== Events ==
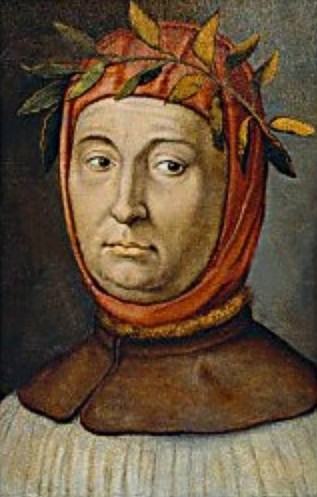
Petrarch (1304-1374)

- 1323 – The name Pléiade is adopted by a group of fourteen poets (seven men and seven women) in Toulouse.
- 1324: 3 May (Holy Cross Day) – The Consistori del Gay Saber, founded the previous year in Toulouse to revive and perpetuate the lyric poetry of the Old Occitan troubadors, holds its first contest. Arnaut Vidal de Castelnou d'Ari wins the violeta d'or (golden violet) for a sirventes in praise of the Virgin Mary. At about this date, Raimon de Cornet writes Doctrinal de trobar in support of the aims of the Gay Saber.
- 1327
  - Between 20 January and 21 September – The deposed King Edward II of England perhaps writes the "Lament of Edward II".
  - 6 April (Good Friday) – Tuscan writer Petrarch sees a woman he names Laura in the church of Sainte-Claire d'Avignon, which awakes in him a lasting passion. He writes a series of sonnets and other poems in Italian dedicated to her up to about 1368, which are collected into Il Canzoniere, an influential model for Renaissance culture.
  - 27 August – Death of Thomas Cobham, Bishop of Worcester in England. His books are bequeathed to the University of Oxford where they are installed in the University Church of St Mary the Virgin, forming the university's first library.
- 1329: February – French poet and composer Guillaume de Machaut is brought to the Siege of Medvėgalis by John of Bohemia so the king's crusading deeds can be commemorated in song and poetry.
- c. 1330 – Production of the Macclesfield Psalter in East Anglia.
- 1331 – Production of the Nuremberg Mahzor.
- 1341: 8 April – Petrarch becomes poet laureate at a ceremony in Rome.
- 1357 – The Polychronicon concludes, Ranulf Higden having ceased work on it at least a dozen years earlier.
- 1360 – The future English writer Geoffrey Chaucer is captured by the French during the Reims campaign of the Hundred Years' War and ransomed by King Edward III of England.
- 1362: September – Petrarch's library is donated to the Republic of Venice, although subsequently dispersed.
- 1368
  - The new Hongwu Emperor in China halts government taxation on books.
  - The Bibliothèque nationale de France (National Library of France) is founded as the Royal Library at the Louvre Palace in Paris by Charles V of France.

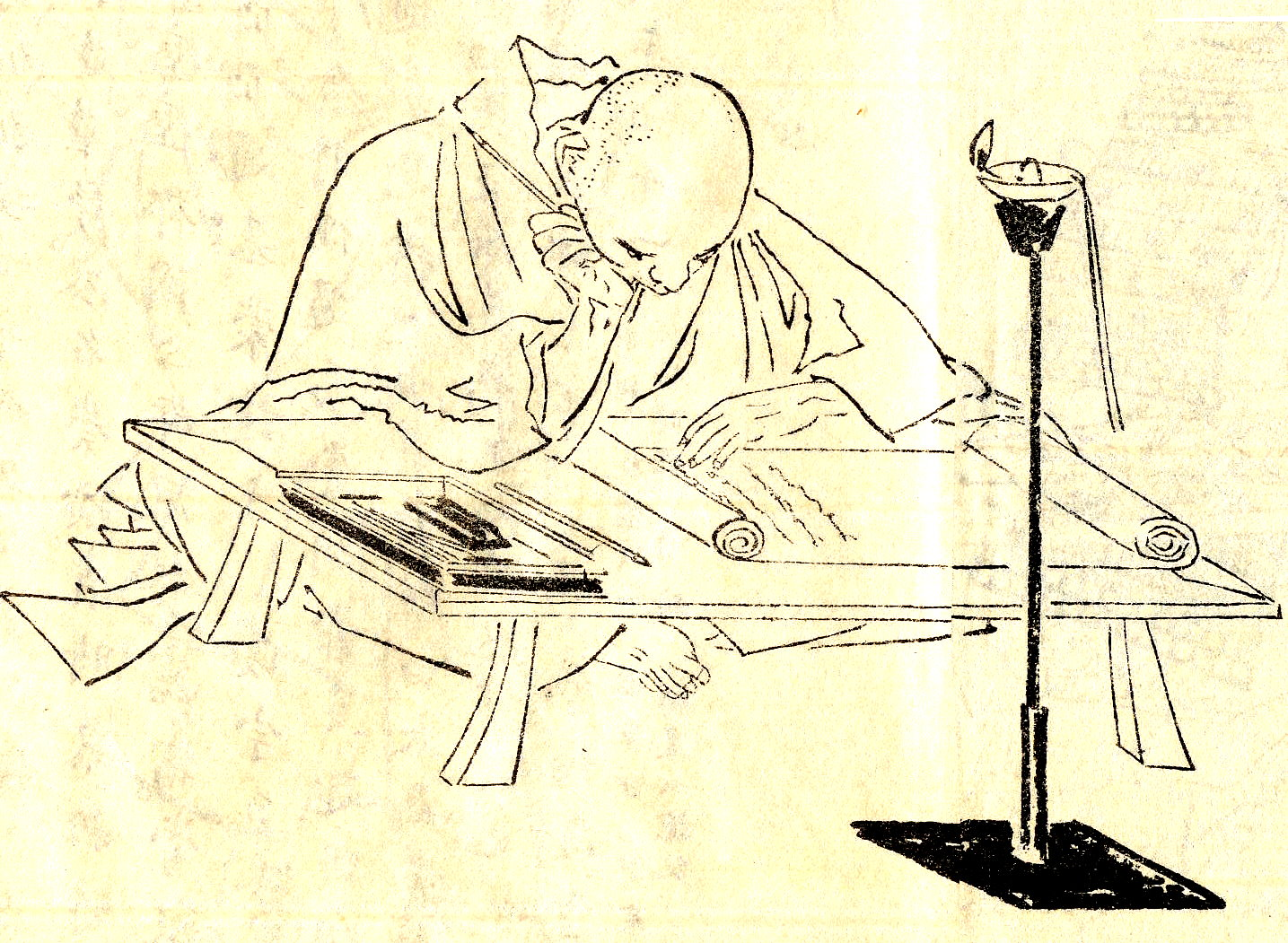
Yoshida Kenkō

- 1370–1398 – Approximate date of production of the earliest part of the Sankt Florian Psalter, one of the earliest surviving texts to use the Polish language.
- 1372 – Old Permic alphabet introduced by Stephen of Perm.
- 1374
  - 23 April: English writer Geoffrey Chaucer is granted a gallon of wine a day for the rest of his life by order of King Edward III of England in recognition of his services.
  - Ludolph of Saxony completes his Vita Christi, which appears first in book form in 1474 and becomes an influence on St Ignatius Loyola in the early 16th century.
- 1377 – Production of the earliest known copy of the Laurentian Codex.
- 1381: 30 May–November – Peasants' Revolt in England. Preacher John Ball apparently cites the poem Piers Plowman (which is revised during this decade) and John Gower includes an account of the events in his Vox Clamantis. On 15 June, the University of Cambridge's library and archives are burnt in the centre of the town, with one Margery Starre leading the mob in a dance to the rallying cry "Away with the learning of clerks, away with it!". The events inspire the late 16th century play The Life and Death of Jack Straw, Robert Southey's dramatic poem Wat Tyler (1794), and novels such as Pierce Egan the Younger's Wat Tyler (1841), William Harrison Ainsworth's Merry England (1874) and William Morris's A Dream of John Ball (1886).
- 1382 – Earliest recorded appearance of Wycliffe's Bible.
- 1384 – Henry of Langenstein writes his letter, De scismate, to Echard von Dersch, Bishop of Worms.
- 1386: October – Geoffrey Chaucer is obliged to give up most of his official offices in London and retires to Kent where he may work on The Canterbury Tales.
- 1388 – Revision of Wycliffe's Bible is completed by John Purvey, and Wyclif's followers, known as Lollards, begin to be persecuted in England.
- 1390–1 – Production of the Book of Ballymote in Ireland.
- 1390s – Production of the Yellow Book of Lecan in Ireland.
- 1397 – Production of the Kiev Psalter in Kiev Rus.
- 1398 – The early 13th century carved wooden text of the Tripitaka Koreana is moved to the Haeinsa Buddhist temple in modern-day South Korea, where it will remain into the 21st century.
- unknown dates
  - The prose original of the Amadis de Gaula is produced (or perhaps translated into Old Spanish from an earlier 14th-century version), perhaps by the knight Vasco de Lobeira or the troubador João de Lobeira.
  - Madhava Kandali produces the Saptakanda Ramayana (a retelling of the Ramayana), one of the earliest written examples of the Assamese language and the first translation from Sanskrit into one of the modern regional Indo-Aryan languages.
  - The Bardo Thodol is revealed to the tertön Karma Lingpa.

== New works ==
- c. 1300
  - Anonymous – Gesta Romanorum
  - Taliesin – Book of Taliesin, Middle Welsh. Taliesin (c. 534 – c. 599) is a Brythonic bard of Sub-Roman Britain believed to have sung at the courts of at least three Celtic British kings.
  - Marguerite Porete – The Mirror of Simple Souls
  - Rustichello da Pisa – The Travels of Marco Polo
- c. 1300–10
  - Gona Budda Reddy – Ranganatha ramayan (శ్రీ రంగనాథ రామాయణం) (Telugu language)
- Early to mid-14th century
  - Shihāb al-Dīn Ahmad bin 'Abd al-Wahhāb al-Nuwayri – The Ultimate Ambition in the Arts of Erudition (encyclopedia of Muslim knowledge)
  - Anonymous Middle English writer from southern England (possible author of all following)
    - King Alisaunder
    - Of Arthour and of Merlin
    - Richard Coer de Lyon
    - The Seven Sages of Rome
  - Pseudo-Bonaventure – Meditations on the Life of Christ
  - Der Busant
  - Long Life of Saint Gerard (Legenda maior S. Gerardi, compiled)
- 1307
  - John of Gaddesden – Rosa Medicinæ
  - Rashid al-Din Hamadani – Jami' al-Tawarikh ("Compendium of Chronicles", often referred to as The Universal History or History of the World, published in Tabriz, Persia)
  - Svit se konča ("World is Ending"), poem in Croatian, Glagolithic manuscript
- c. 1308–21
  - Dante Alighieri – Divine Comedy (Comedia)
- c. 1309–24
  - Speculum Humanae Salvationis
  - The Book of Dede Korkut
- 1310
  - Amir Khusrow – Khazain-ul-Futuh
- 1310–1320
  - Queen Mary Psalter
- 1312
  - Jacques de Longuyon – Les Voeux du paon (The Vows of the Peacock)
- 1315–16
  - Amir Khusrow – Duval Rani–Khizr Khan (Romance of Duval Rani and Khizr Khan; masnavi)
- c. 1315–25
  - Rochefoucauld Grail
- 1316–18
  - Amir Khusrow – Noh-Sepehr (Nine Skies; 3masnavi)
- 1318
  - Arnaut Vidal de Castelnou d'Ari – Guilhem de la Barra
- c. 1320–35
  - Erikskrönikan
- c. 1320–30
  - Jacob of Liège – Speculum musicae
- 1320
  - Dante Alighieri – Quaestio de Aqua et Terra
  - Amir Khusrow – Tughluq Nama (Book of the Tughluqs; prose)
- 1320–23
  - William of Pagula – Oculus Sacerdotis (Priest's Eye, a manual for priests)
- c. 1321
  - Liber Legum Regum Antiquorum (attributed to Andrew Horn)
- c. 1321–23
  - Sanguozhi Pinghua (三國志平話, Sānguózhì Pínghuà) Records of the Three Kingdoms in Plain Language)
- 1326
  - Ibn Abi Zar – Rawd al-Qirtas
- 1328
  - Ramon Muntaner - Chronicle (Crònica), the longest of The Four Great Catalan Chronicles
- c. 1329–32
  - Yoshida Kenkō (吉田 兼好) – Tsurezuregusa (Essays in Idleness)
- 1330
  - Robert of Basevorn – The Form of Preaching (date of first known MS)
  - 'Michael' – Kildare Poems (MS of about this date)
  - Odoric of Pordenone – Relatio
- c. 1330–40
  - Perceforest
- 1330–43
  - Juan Ruiz, Archpriest of Hita – The Book of Good Love (El Libro de Buen Amor)
- c. 1330–1400
  - Luo Guanzhong (attributed) – Romance of the Three Kingdoms (三國演義)
- 1335
  - Matthew Blastares (compiler) – Syntagma Canonum
  - Lê Tắc – An Nam chí lược (安南志略)
  - Don Juan Manuel – Tales of Count Lucanor
- 1335–40
  - Giovanni Boccaccio – Il Filostrato
- 1338–14 (first published 1396–1397)
  - Petrarch – Africa
- 1340
  - Michael of Northgate (translator) – Ayenbite of Inwyt
- c. 1340
  - Anonymous - The Ointment Seller
- c. 1340–41
  - Giovanni Boccaccio – Teseida
- c. 1340–1349
  - Dafydd ap Gwilym – The Girls of Llanbadarn, The Dream and The Seagull
- 1345
  - Richard de Bury – The Philobiblon
- 1346
  - Toqto'a (Yuan dynasty) (editor) – History of Song (宋史, Sòng Shǐ)
- c. 1350
  - Baudouin de Sebourc (probably from Hainaut)
  - Prick of Conscience (Yorkshire)
  - White Book of Rhydderch
  - The Tale of Gamelyn (anonymous)
  - 'William' – William of Palerne (English translation)
- c. 1352
  - Bahubali Pandita of Sringeri – Dharmanathapuranam
  - Wynnere and Wastoure (anonymous)
- 1353
  - Giovanni Boccaccio – The Decameron
- c. 1355
  - Giovanni Boccaccio – Corbaccio
- c. 1360–84
  - John of Fordun – Chronica Gentis Scotorum
- 1365
  - Mpu Prapanca – Nagarakretagama
- c. 1367
  - William Langland (presumed author) – Piers Plowman (earliest likely date)
- 1368–71
  - Geoffrey Chaucer – The Book of the Duchess
- 1370
  - Bureau of History of the Ming dynasty, under direction of Song Lian – History of Yuan (元史, Yuán Shǐ)
- 1371
  - The Travels of Sir John Mandeville (anonymous)
  - Geoffroy IV de la Tour Landry – The Book of the Knight of the Tower
  - Kakuichi (compiler) – The Tale of the Heike (平家物語, Heike Monogatari)
  - Ibn Marzuq – The Correct and Fine Traditions About the Glorious Deeds of our Master Abu 'l-Hasan (Musnad as-sahid al-hasan fi maʿathir mawlana Abi 'l Hasan)
- c. 1374
  - Beatrijs
- 1375
  - John Barbour – The Brus
- 1376
  - John Wycliffe – De civili dominio (On Civil Dominion)
- 1377
  - Ibn Khaldun – Muqaddimah (Prolegomena)
- 1378
  - Qu You – Jiandeng Xinhua (剪灯新话, "New stories told while trimming the wick")
- 1381
  - Amarkosh (अमरकोश, Sanskrit-Nepal Bhasa dictionary)
- 1382
  - Jacobus de Teramo – Consolatio peccatorum, seu Processus Luciferi contra Jesum Christum
  - Red Book of Hergest (soon after this date)
- c. 1383
  - Sofonii of Razan – Zadonshchina
- 1384
  - Terç del Crestià, volume 3 of Lo Crestià
- Late 1380s
  - Walter Hilton – The Scale of Perfection
- 1387
  - John Trevisa – translation of Ranulf Higden's Polychronicon, including "Dialogue on Translation Between a Lord and a Clerk"
- 1389
  - Gopalraj Vamshavali (गोपालराज वंशावली, a history of Nepal)
- c. 1390
  - Anonymous – The Forme of Cury (earliest cookbook in the English language)
- 1390
  - John Gower – Confessio Amantis
- 1390s
  - Geoffrey Chaucer – The Canterbury Tales
- 1395
  - Lady Julian of Norwich – Revelations of Divine Love, first published book in English language to be written by a woman.
  - Mangaraja II – Mangaraja Nighantu (lexicon, 1398)
  - 'Pearl Poet'
    - Sir Gawain and the Green Knight
    - Pearl
    - Cleanness
    - Patience
  - Sayana – commentary on the Vedas.
  - Ipomadon (Middle English tail-rhyme verse version; earliest likely date)
  - South English Legendary
  - Völsunga saga (approximate date of written version)
  - Water Margin (水浒传, Shui Hu Zhuan; approximate date of earliest components known)
- c. 1399
  - Bernat Metge - The Dream (Lo Somni), first humanist work in Catalan.
  - Christine de Pizan
    - Cent Ballades d'Amant et de Dame, Virelyas, Rondeaux
    - L'Épistre au Dieu d'amours
    - L'Épistre de Othéa a Hector
    - "Richard the Redeless"
- Unknown
  - Egils saga einhenda ok Ásmundar berserkjabana
  - Epic of Sundiata
  - Grettis saga (approximate date)
  - Kavi Malla – Manmathavijaya
  - Peterborough Psalter

=== Drama ===
- Li Qianfu – Circle of Chalk (Chinese: 灰闌記; pinyin: huīlán jì)
- c. 1350 – Misteri d'Elx (Valencian)
- 1358–76 – Katherine of Sutton (adaptations) – Depositio, Descensus Christi, Elevatio and Visitatio
- Late 14th century – Ordinalia (Middle Cornish)

== Births ==
- 1303 – Bridget of Sweden (Birgitta Birgersdotter), Swedish mystic, writer and saint (died 1373)
- 1304 – Petrarch (Francesco Petrarca) Tuscan poet (died 1374)
- 1313 – Giovanni Boccaccio, Italian writer (died 1375)
- c. 1315 or 1317 – Hafez, Persian poet (died 1390)
- 1320 – Lalleshwari, Kashmiri Hindu poet (died 1392)
- 1332: 27 May – Ibn Khaldun, North African historiographer and philosopher (died 1406)
- c. 1332 – Catherine of Vadstena, Swedish mystic, writer and saint (died 1381)
- 1333 – Kan'ami (Kan'ami Kiyotsugu (観阿弥 清次), Japanese Noh actor (died 1384)
- c. 1340–45 – Walter Hilton, English mystic writing in Latin and English (died 1396)
- c. November 1342 – Julian of Norwich, English religious writer and mystic (died c. 1416)
- 1343 – Geoffrey Chaucer, English poet (died 1400)
- 1347 – Catherine of Siena, Italian theologian and saint (died 1380)
- 1348 – Jan of Jenštejn, Archbishop of Prague, writer, composer and poet (died 1400)
- c. 1363 – Zeami Motokiyo (世阿弥 元清), Japanese Noh actor and playwright (died c. 1443)
- September 1364 – Christine de Pizan, Venetian-born Middle French court poet and writer (died c. 1430)
- c. 1368 – Thomas Hoccleve, English poet and clerk (died 1426)
- c. 1373 – Margery Kempe, English mystic and autobiographer (died c. 1440)
- 1378 – Zhu Quan (朱權), Prince of Ning, Chinese military commander, feudal lord, historian and playwright (died 1448)
- 1384 – Enrique de Villena, Spanish writer, theologian and poet (died 1434)
- 1393 – John Capgrave, English historian and scholastic theologian (died 1464)
- 1398 – Íñigo López de Mendoza, 1st Marquis of Santillana, Castilian politician and poet (died 1458)

== Deaths ==
- After 1306 – Adam de la Halle, French trouvère poet (born c. 1237)
- 1308 – Duns Scotus, Scottish philosopher and theologian (born c. 1266)
- 1309 – Angela of Foligno, Italian mystic and saint (born 1248)
- 1310: 1 June – Marguerite Porete, French mystic (burnt as heretic, year of birth unknown)
- 1315: 10 March – Agnes Blannbekin, Austrian Beguine and Christian mystic (born c. 1244)
- c. 1315 – Ramon Llull, Majorcan polymath and novelist in Catalan (born c. 1232)
- 1321: 14 September – Dante Alighieri, Italian poet (born c. 1265)
- 1325:
  - 7 January – King Denis of Portugal, poet
  - October – Amir Khusrow, Sufi poet
- 1345: 14 April – Richard de Bury, English bishop and bibliophile (born 1287)
- 1349: September – Richard Rolle, English hermit, mystic and religious writer (probably born between 1390 and 1400)
- c. 1350 – Yoshida Kenkō (吉田 兼好), Japanese author and Buddhist monk (probably born 1283)
- 1364: 12 March – Ranulf Higden, English chronicler
- 1373: 23 July – Bridget of Sweden (Birgitta Birgersdotter), Swedish mystic, writer and saint
- 1374: 19 July – Petrarch, Italian poet
- 1375: 21 December – Giovanni Boccaccio, Italian poet
- 1377: April – Guillaume de Machaut, French poet and composer
- 1380:
  - 29 April – Catherine of Siena, Italian theologian and saint
  - 2 December – John of Ruysbroeck (Jan van Ruysbroeck), Flemish mystic (born 1293 or 1294)
- 1381: 24 March – Catherine of Vadstena, Swedish mystic, writer and saint
- 1384:
  - 8 June – Kan'ami (Kan'ami Kiyotsugu, 観阿弥 清次), Japanese Noh playwright and actor (born 1333);
  - December – John Wycliffe, philosopher, translator and theologian (born c.1320);
  - Mir Sayyid Ali Hamadani, Persian Sūfī, poet scholar.
- 1392 – Lalleshwari, Kashmiri Shaivite poet and mystic
- 1395: 13 March – John Barbour, Scottish poet
- 1396: 24 March – Walter Hilton, English Augustinian mystic writing in Latin and English (born c. 1340–45)
- 1400: 25 October – Geoffrey Chaucer, English poet (born c. 1343)

== See also ==
- 14th century in poetry
- 13th century in literature
- 15th century in literature
- List of works of fiction set in the 14th century
- List of years in literature
