= 1369 in literature =

List of years in literature	(table)
- … 1359; 1360; 1361; 1362; 1363; 1364; 1365; 1366; 1367; 1368; 1369; 1370; 1371; 1372; 1373; 1374; 1375; 1376; 1377; 1378; 1379 …
- Art; Archaeology; Architecture; Literature; Music; Philosophy; Science; +...

== Works ==
- Geoffrey Chaucer - The Book of the Duchess (probable date)

== Births ==
- date unknown
  - Paul of Venice, philosopher (died 1429)
  - Xie Jin, Chinese scholar-official and poet (died 1415)

== Deaths ==
- October (?) - Thomas Grey, English chronicler
- December 31 - Sir John Chandos, English knight whose herald produced The Life of the Black Prince (born 1320)
- date unknown - Simon Tunsted, English Franciscan friar, theologian, philosopher and musician
- probable - Prochoros Kydones, Greek theologian (born c.1330)
