= John Ionopoulos =

Byzantine jurist

John Ionopoulos, Latinized as Joannes Junopulus or Janopulus (Greek: Ιωάννης Ιωνόπουλος, fl. 14th century) was a jurist of the late Byzantine Empire.

In the title to one of his pieces, given in the Jus Graeco-Romanum of Leunclavius, he is called "John the chartophylax, the son of Ionopoulos". Johann Albert Fabricius in one place gives 1370 as the date at which he flourished, but says in another place that he flourished before Harmenopoulos (1320–1385).

The following pieces are said to be by Ionopoulos:

- Breve Patriarchale, concerning a man who had married his mother's second cousin. It is inserted in the Jus Gr. Rom. of Leunclavius (lib. iv. p. 291), and in the heading or preamble is ascribed to Junopulus.
- An exposition of ecclesiastical law, De Nuptiis Septimi Gradus. This piece is inserted in the same collection as the foregoing (lib. iii. p. 204), but does not bear the name of Ionopoulos: it is ascribed to him by Bandini.

Nicolaus Comnenus Papadopoli in his Praenotiones Mystagogicae, an authority of but little weight, cites the following as works of Ionopoulos:

- Explicatio Canonum Poenitentialum Gregorii Thaumaturgi
- Responsum duodecimum ad Cathiolicos Iberiae
- Suggestio ad D. Patriarchum de Testimonio Clericorum
