= Fons memorabilium universi =

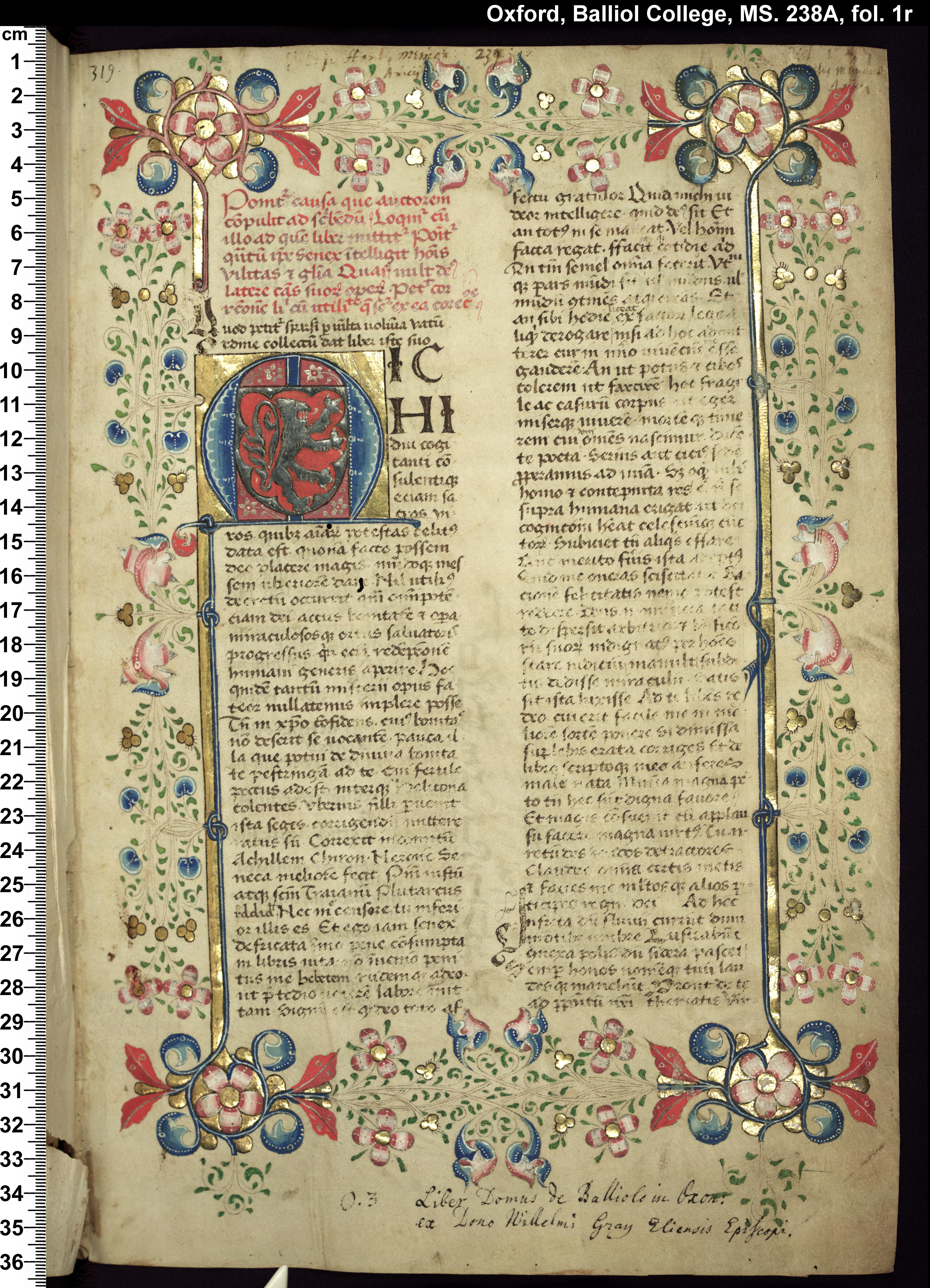
The first page of the first of five volumes of an illuminated manuscript copy of this text, commissioned by Bishop William Grey, created c. 1444–1448, and given by Grey to Balliol College.

Fons memorabilium universi ("Source of notable information about the universe") is an early encyclopedia, written in Latin by the Italian humanist Domenico Bandini of Arezzo (also given as Domenico di Bandino or Dominicus Bandinus, c. 1335 – 1418). Planned to inform and edify educated men who lack other books, the work covered God and the natural world, as was common for encyclopedias of the time, but also added a voluminous last part dealing with man and historical figures, philosophy and history, theology, ethics, heretics and women.

Bandini, a teacher of grammar and rhetoric who lived in Florence, Bologna, Città di Castello and Arezzo, worked on the encyclopedia from before 1374 until his death in 1418. In Florence he was influenced by Coluccio Salutati, causing him to emphasize topics related to the classical antiquity in his work. Bandini's son Laurentius completed and published the work after Bandini's death and added an introductory apology, defending the work against criticism of style.

At least 26 manuscripts survive, including one at Balliol College, of which digital photographs are available online, and two at the Vatican Library. Many of these contain only parts of the work. They all date from before 1460. The whole work consists of between two and five volumes, depending on writing style and size.

The work was not very influential and was already almost forgotten in the 15th century. It was never printed, unlike the very successful 13th century encyclopedia De proprietatibus rerum by Bartholomeus Anglicus, from which Bandini had borrowed heavily. He also frequently cited the earlier works of Marcus Terentius Varro, Pliny the Elder, Gaius Julius Solinus, Isidore of Seville and Hrabanus Maurus.

The end of book 8 "on the planets" contains an unrelated interpolation praising two lawyers from Bologna. The paragraph has been interpreted as an advertisement inserted by the lawyers, either by having paid the scribes or by having worked as scribes themselves.

== Organization ==
The work is organized in 5 parts (to reflect the five wounds of Christ), with each part divided into several books containing numerous cross references. Each of the 34 books covers one circle of topics. Some of these books consist of several introductory and systematical chapters, followed by an alphabetically ordered list of articles. This organization had been developed in the 13th century by Vincent of Beauvais in his Speculum naturale and had also been used by Bartholomaus Anglicus in his De proprietatibus rerum and by Thomas of Cantimpré in his Liber de natura rerum.

The titles of the books are:

- Part I
  - 1. De deo
  - 2. De angelis
  - 3. De anima
  - 4. De inferno
- Part II
  - 5. De mundo
  - 6. De celo et signis celestibus
  - 7. De stellis fixis
  - 8. De planetis
  - 9. De tempore
- Part III
  - 10. De elementis in generali
  - 11. De elemento ignis
  - 12. De elemento aeris
  - 13. De impressionibus aeris
  - 14. De ornatu aeris (de avibus)
  - 15. De aquis salsis
  - 16. De aquis dulcibus
  - 17. De piscibus
- Part IV
  - 18. De provinciis
  - 19. De insulis
  - 20. De civitatibus
  - 21. De aedificiis
  - 22. De populis
  - 23. De montibus
  - 24. De arboribus
  - 25. De herbis
  - 26. De quadrupedibus
  - 27. De reptilibus, serpentibus et vermibus
  - 28. De lapidibus et gemmis
  - 29. De metallis
- Part V
  - 30. De viris claris
  - 31. De sectis philosophorum
  - 32. De virtutibus theologicis et moralibus
  - 33. De sectis haereticorum
  - 34. De mulieribus claris
