= Dialogue on Translation Between a Lord and a Clerk =

1387 essay by John Trevisa

The Dialogue on Translation between a Lord and a Clerk, or Dialogus inter dominum et clericum, was written by John Trevisa. Along with the dedicatory Epistle, it forms the introduction to his 1387 translation of the Polychronicon of Ranulf Higden, commissioned by Trevisa's patron, Lord Berkeley. Written in Middle English, it consists of a series of arguments made by the clerk on why books should not be translated from learned languages such as Latin, each one followed by a rebuttal from the lord. The clerk eventually agrees, and the exchange concludes with a prayer for guidance in the translation.

== Influences ==
This work was most probably influenced by a dialogue that Trevisa had translated while studying at Oxford, The Dialogue between the Knight and the Clerk, a conversation between Sir Thomas and his chaplain. It is commonly attributed to William of Ockham and was written in support of the French monarch.

== Representation ==
The dialogue is not a historical record; rather, it uses dramatization as literary criticism in the form of commentary on the translation process. As the preface for the Polychronicon, it is a defense of the translation of a seminal text on world history.

There are a few readings of the figures of the dialogue. One interpretation, based on the victor of the dialogue and its context in prefacing a Latin translation, is that Trevisa speaks through the lord figure. Another is that Trevisa is the clerk and Lord Berkeley is the lord. Yet a third reaction is that the one-sided nature of the dialogue renders it unable to represent a conversation between two people.

== Arguments ==
In the Dialogue, the lord commissions a prose translation of Higden's Polychronicon, which the clerk initially refuses and eventually accepts. Trevisa uses the dialogue in order to criticize the "grete mischief" of knowledge remaining inaccessible due to language.

=== The lord ===
The lord, or Dominus, begins the dialogue with a speech on language and the utility of Latin as a lingua franca. He then requests that the clerk translate Higden's Polychronicon from Latin into English.

The arguments of the lord are characterized by Watson as based in "capacious intellect and improbably egalitarian ethics." The lord notes that not everyone has the ability to learn Latin. When the clerk acquiesces and asks the lord to choose between a poetry or prose translation, the lord selects prose, which he argues will benefit the vernacular audience of the Polychronicon because it is "cleer and pleyn" and more succinct.

The lord notably uses the translation of the Bible as precedent in his responses. The Bible, according to the lord, is itself a translation from Hebrew to Greek to Latin, and it must also be translated into English in order to be understood by common people. He further advocates for the use of English because it is utilized in sermons. Other precedents discussed by the lord includes the translations of Aristotle's works from Greek to Latin and of the works of Caedmon, the earliest known English poet.

=== The clerk ===
The clerk's initial refusal is due to his belief that Latin is a language used by many people, but only the English know English. He also notes that the lord himself knows Latin, to which the lord responds that there is some Latin in the Polychronicon that is beyond his ability. The clerk then argues that it is not necessary for all to know the "cronicles," to which the lord responds with the profitability of a translation. The clerk also voices concerns regarding criticisms of the translations, and the lord concedes that translation cannot be perfect.

According to Watson, throughout the dialogue, the clerk provides "increasingly feeble and snobbish" refutations.

== Significance ==
The Dialogue marks the first instance of the patron as a literary trope in Middle English. It also, by presenting arguments in favor of translations for vernacular audiences, is a precursor to the fifteenth-century practice of translation of secular literature for profit. William Caxton, who published an edition of Trevisa's translation of the Polychronicon in 1482, notes these two features in his prologue.

Despite being a prolific translator, the Dialogue and the Epistle were Trevisa's only original works.

David Lawton writes that the dialogue is the most famous writing in the "genre of fictionalized debate about Bible translation." Stephen Morrison and Aude Mairey note that the Dialogue demonstrates awareness of the social and political implications of vernacular translation.

The Dialogue is published, along with the Epistle and translation of the Polychronicon, in the Middle English Pseudo-Turpin, preserved at the Huntington Library. Due to its inclusion in textbooks and anthologies, the Dialogue is Trevisa's most well-known work in American classrooms. The exchange is excerpted on the title page of Rev. John Sharpe's translation of William of Malmesbury's History of the Kings of England.

=== In translation studies ===
Lawton argues that translators' prologues are sources for translation theory. At the start of the dialogue, when alluding to the Tower of Babel, Trevisa presents two solutions to the challenge of "translingual" communication: translation and a universal language, Latin. The Dialogue and the Epistle are both regarded as forms of "direct dissemination" of information about translation.

By translating the Dialogue, Trevisa serves as an intermediary, or "mene," for not only those readers who cannot read Latin but also those who can read both Latin and Middle English (and therefore evaluate the quality of the translation). His theories regarding translation were in accordance with the aims of the early Christian Church, which emphasized ""serving" the source text" and preserving original meaning.

During this time period, translation was a necessary means to developing the corpus of secular English literature. It was also a time at which "translator's anxiety about the function of translation [was] pervasive," which resulted in the use of simpler language and which was recommended by the lord in the Dialogue.

Trevisa engages in interpolation when translating unfamiliar Latin terms in the Polychronicon, and he provides his reasoning for doing so in the Dialogue.
