= De proprietatibus rerum =

13th-century Latin encyclopedia by Bartholomaeus Anglicus

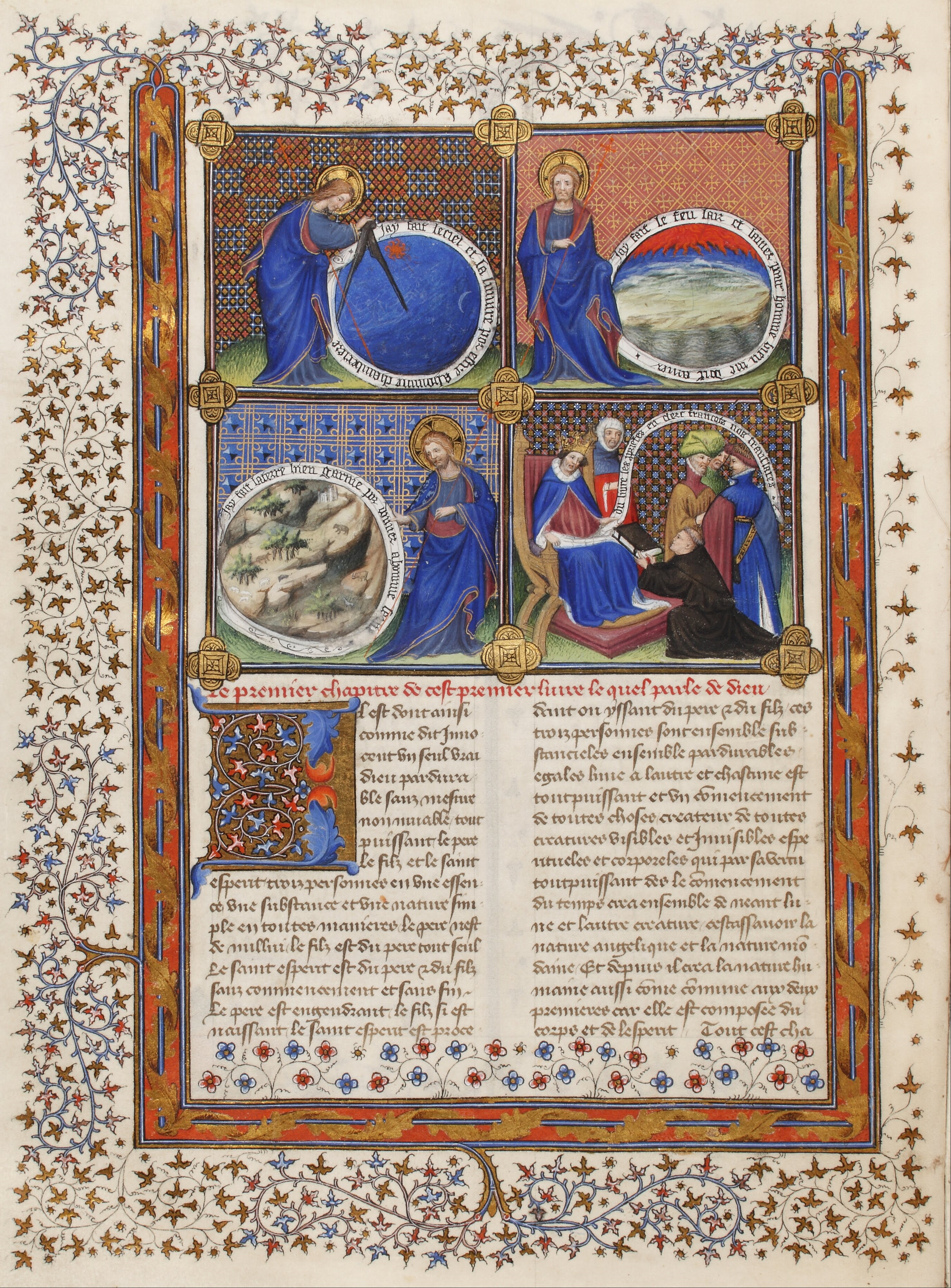
- An illumination of the Creation in a c. 1400 manuscript of Jean Corbechon's French translation
- Author: Bartholomaeus Anglicus
- Language: Latin
- Subject: Theology, natural philosophy, medicine, cosmology, geography, natural history
- Genre: Encyclopedia
- Publication date: c. 1240

De proprietatibus rerum (On the Properties of Things) is a Latin encyclopedia compiled by the Franciscan scholar Bartholomaeus Anglicus in the 13th century. Generally dated to about 1240 and completed in Saxony, the work is divided into nineteen books treating subjects ranging from God, angels, and the soul to human anatomy and medicine, cosmology, geography, plants, animals, minerals, colors, tastes, weights, measures, and music. It is the most widely copied, adapted, and translated medieval encyclopedia.

Bartholomew presented the work as an aid to the study of the Bible and emphasized the possibility of understanding the Creator through the created world. The encyclopedia was initially associated with the educational and preaching needs of the Franciscan order, but its readership soon extended to other religious orders and eventually to lay readers and aristocratic patrons. About one hundred Latin manuscripts and fragments survive, while medieval translations were made into several vernacular languages, including Italian, French, Provençal, English, Spanish, and Dutch.

The work remained in circulation for centuries through manuscript copying, translation, adaptation, and printing. Among its best-known vernacular versions are the French translation completed by Jean Corbechon for Charles V of France in 1372 and the Middle English translation completed by John Trevisa for Thomas Berkeley in 1398.

== Composition and purpose ==
Bartholomaeus Anglicus was a member of the Franciscan order who was sent from France to help organize the Franciscan province of Saxony in 1231. Although details of his earlier education and identity have been debated, scholars generally agree that he completed De proprietatibus rerum in Saxony around 1240. No manuscript from Bartholomew's own lifetime is known to survive and the encyclopedia's Latin text consequently exists in a variable manuscript tradition rather than in a single definitive authorial copy.

In the prohemium and in introductory material to individual books, Bartholomew described the work as a guide to the created world intended particularly for students of the Bible. His stated aims included assisting readers in understanding Scripture and its glosses, contemplating the Creator through creation, and assembling useful material from earlier authorities in an accessible form. Bartholomew described himself as collecting the words of wise and holy writers for "simple and humble" brethren who might otherwise lack access to those works.

The work belonged to a broader 12th- and 13th-century tradition of large-scale compilations of knowledge that included the works of Alexander Neckam, Thomas of Cantimpré, Vincent of Beauvais, and Albertus Magnus. These works largely followed the medieval tradition of compilatio, in which a compiler organized inherited authorities into a useful and accessible body of knowledge rather than attempting to produce an entirely original account of the natural world. By the end of the 13th century, surviving copies were being produced with running headings, tables, marginalia, and other features.

== Contents and organization ==
De proprietatibus rerum consists of nineteen books arranged in a progression from God and immaterial beings through human beings and the physical universe to animals, plants, minerals, and the sensible properties of material things. The sequence reflects a hierarchical conception of creation, beginning with God and descending toward increasingly material subjects. The book is divided into multiple sections concerning theology and the soul, the human body and human activities, celestial bodies and time, the four elements, living things, geography, and finally the accidentia, or sensible attributes of things.

Book	Latin title	Principal subject
I	De Deo	God and the names of God
II	De proprietatibus angelorum	Angels, including good and fallen angels
III	De anima	The soul and reason
IV	De humani corporis	Bodily qualities and humors
V	De hominis corpore	Parts of the human body
VI	De etate hominis	Ages and activities of human life
VII	De infirmitatibus	Disease, poisons, and medicine
VIII	De mundo	The world and celestial bodies
IX	De temporibus	Time and its divisions
X	De materia et forma	Matter, form, and fire
XI	De aere	Air and weather
XII	De avibus	Birds
XIII	De aqua	Water and aquatic animals
XIV	De terra	The earth and its features
XV	De regionibus et provinciis	Regions, provinces, and places
XVI	De lapidibus et metallis	Stones, gems, minerals, and metals
XVII	De herbis et plantis	Herbs, plants, and trees
XVIII	De animalibus	Land animals
XIX	De accidentibus	Colors, smells, tastes, liquids, weights, measures, numbers, and music

The individual books are divided into short chapters organized around particular beings, substances, places, or properties. This structure made the encyclopedia suitable both for consecutive reading and for consulting individual subjects independently.

== Sources and method ==
Bartholomew compiled material from classical, Christian, and medieval authorities rather than restricting the work to a single philosophical or theological tradition. Among the classical authors transmitted through the work were Aristotle, Plato, Pliny the Elder, and Solinus, while Christian authorities included Jerome, Gregory the Great, Augustine of Hippo, Bede, and Isidore of Seville. Bartholomew drew from both Isidore's Etymologiae and Pliny's Naturalis historia as models for the encyclopedia.

Bartholomew normally identified authorities in the course of the text, a feature that allowed later readers and excerptors to preserve the names of the writers on whom individual passages depended. He may not have had every cited work physically available while composing the encyclopedia in Saxony and may sometimes have cited material from memory.

== Manuscript transmission and readership ==
Approximately one hundred Latin manuscripts and fragments of De proprietatibus rerum survive, and a complete copy can extend to roughly 400 folios. The surviving Latin manuscripts include copies of English, French, German, and Italian provenance dating from the late 13th through the 16th centuries. Their geographical distribution indicates that the encyclopedia circulated widely across western Europe.

Although originally associated with Franciscan education, surviving evidence indicates that the encyclopedia soon circulated among members of other religious orders and among readers who used it for preaching and biblical exegesis. By the later Middle Ages it was also owned by lay and aristocratic readers, and elaborate vernacular copies could function as prestigious books as well as reference works.

Edward IV of England acquired a two-volume copy of the French translation in 1482 and had his arms placed over the original royal dedication to Charles V of France. A surviving British Library copy of Corbechon's French translation, Royal MS 17 E III, contains nineteen illuminated initials or miniatures marking the beginnings of the nineteen books.

== Vernacular translations ==
Medieval translations of all or part of De proprietatibus rerum were produced in Anglo-Norman French, continental French, Provençal, Italian, Spanish, English, and Dutch.

=== Italian ===
One of the earliest vernacular versions was made in 1309 by the Mantuan notary Vivaldo Belcalzer for his patron Guido Bonacolsi, ruler of Mantua. The British Library's Additional MS 8785 preserves Belcalzer's Mantuan version and contains material corresponding to all nineteen books of the Latin original.

=== French ===
Jean Corbechon, chaplain to Charles V of France, completed a French translation, commonly known as the Livre des propriétés des choses, in 1372 at the king's command. Corbechon's translation circulated in illuminated manuscripts as well as more functional copies. A manuscript now in the Fitzwilliam Museum, produced in Paris around 1415 and commissioned by Amadeus VIII of Savoy, is one of the most sumptuous surviving copies of the encyclopedia.

The French version also entered print during the 15th century; an edition of Le Proprietaire des choses was printed at Lyon by Pierre Farget and Matthias Huss in 1482.

=== English ===
John Trevisa completed his Middle English translation, On the Properties of Things, at Berkeley Castle on 6 February 1398 for his patron Thomas Berkeley. Trevisa translated all nineteen books into the English dialect used in his region. Eight manuscripts and three fragments of Trevisa's version dating from the early through the late 15th century survive. Trevisa's translation tends to preserve much of the Latin technical vocabulary of its source, a practice that facilitated reference between the vernacular and Latin versions. Literary scholar Emily Steiner argues that Trevisa's sustained engagement with Bartholomew's encyclopedia contributed to an accumulative and expressive vernacular prose style and forms an important episode in the development of late-medieval English prose.

Wynkyn de Worde printed the first edition of Trevisa's English translation around 1495. Further English editions were printed by Thomas Berthelet in 1535 and by Stephen Batman in 1582. Batman's edition, entitled Batman uppon Bartholome, explicitly presented itself as a corrected and enlarged version and incorporated additional material from later authors.

=== Other translations ===
Months and seasons, from the Spanish version

An anonymous Provençal translation, the Elucidari de las proprietatz de totas res naturals, was produced before 1391 for Gaston III, Count of Foix. A Spanish version attributed to Fray Vicente de Burgos was printed at Toulouse by Heinrich Meyer on 18 September 1494. A Middle Dutch translation, Van den proprieteyten der dinghen, survives in an edition printed at Haarlem in 1485.

== Printing and early modern editions ==
The Latin De proprietatibus rerum entered print in Germany and France during the 1470s, relatively early in the development of European printing. A Latin edition was printed at Lyon by Petrus Ungarus on 21 November 1482. Johann Koelhoff printed another Latin edition at Cologne on 19 January 1483. Anton Koberger issued an edition at Nuremberg on 20 June 1492.

The English edition produced by Wynkyn de Worde around 1495 included woodcut illustrations and constituted the first printed version of Trevisa's translation. Thomas Berthelet's 1535 printing and Batman's heavily augmented edition of 1582 kept Trevisa's English version available during the 16th century.

A Latin edition appeared at Frankfurt in 1601, after which the encyclopedia largely ceased to be reprinted in its complete early form, although it continued to attract antiquarian and scholarly attention.

== Reception and influence ==
The encyclopedia's organization and extensive citation of earlier authorities made it particularly suitable for excerpting and adaptation. Medieval readers drew material from it for sermons, biblical interpretation, devotional writing, medical collections, natural history, and other compilations. Its descriptions of animals, plants, stones, and other natural objects could be reused either as practical information or as material for moral and allegorical interpretation.

The work's uses changed substantially over time. The encyclopedia's earliest role was as a source of examples and information for preachers, while from the 14th through the 17th centuries it increasingly functioned as a repository of natural philosophy and natural history. It was originally a work associated with Franciscan instruction before being one generally owned, translated, adapted, and printed for clerical, aristocratic, and lay audiences.

In later medieval England, De proprietatibus rerum was among the encyclopedic works most frequently mined for information by literary and religious writers.

== See also ==
- Bartholomaeus Anglicus
- John Trevisa
- Vincent of Beauvais
- Thomas of Cantimpré
- Alexander Neckam
