= Vivaldo Belcazer =

Damaged presentation miniature inside an initial in the London copy of Belcazer's translation. The image depicts Belcazer handing his work over to his patron, Guido Bonacolsi.

Vivaldo Belcazer or Belcalzer (fl. 1279–1308) was a Mantuan councillor and translator. His vernacular translation of Bartholomaeus Anglicus' encyclopedia De proprietatibus rerum is an early contribution to Lombard literature.

== Life ==
Belcazer was born before 1250 in or near Mantua. His life is poorly documented. On 23 September 1279, as a member of the consiglio maggiore for the quarter of San Giacomo, Belcazer signed the peace treaty with Verona and Brescia. This is the earliest reference to him.

After 1291, Belcazer served as a notary and councillor under the rule of the Bonacolsi, especially Bardellone and Guido. According to the Annales Mantuani, he was elected one of the elders (anziani) of the new consiglio del signore on 6 July 1294. In 1296, he purchased a plot of land in the vineyards outside the walls of Mantua.

On 2 July 1299, Belcazer signed the act of abdication of Bardellone Bonacolsi. On 14 May 1305, he proposed in the consiglio a peace deal with Brescia, which was accepted. On 13 April 1307, he signed the treaty by which Mantua formed a league with Verona, Brescia, Parma and Modena.

Belcazer had a son, Pietro, who was involved in politics by 1306. Vivaldo's date of death is unknown, but was sometime after 1308.

== Works ==
Start of Belcazer's translation in the Bodleian manuscript

Belcazer's only known work is the Trattato di scienza universal, an abridged translation into the local vernacular of Bartholomaeus Anglicus' De proprietatibus rerum, a Latin encyclopedia in 19 books completed around 1260. It is the earliest of a string of vernacular translations. He dedicated the translation to Guido Bonacolsi—Gui dey Bonacols, Capitaniy e perpetual segnor, de Mantoa—indicating that he completed the work after Guido succeeded his brother in 1299 and before Guido's death in 1309. The presentation copy of this work survives, rebound, in London. A note added in 1320 and lost in the rebinding indicated that it was given by Guido to the Paduan nobleman Uguccione de' Lismanini.

Belcazer's work does not identify itself as a translation. It is a faithful translation that removes much of the doctrinal material and citations of Bartholomaeus to produce a more streamlined text. Belcazer has occasionally added his own observations. It is principally of interest to historians for the light it sheds on the Mantuan vernacular. Belcazer's dedicatory prologue is also original and, like his abridgement, indicates that he was interested primarily in creating a text for a secular aristocrat.

There are three surviving manuscripts of Belcazer's translation. The presentation copy is an illustrated manuscript with marginal corrections probably added by Belcazer himself. Its shelfmark today is London, British Library, Additional 8785. The manuscript Florence, Biblioteca Riccardiana, MS 2155 is from the late 14th century. Oxford, Bodleian Library, MS Canon. Ital. 24, was completed on 16 March 1446 by the Bolognese scribe Bartolomeo de' Ghislieri for one Iacopo Foscarini. The Riccardiano and Bodleian manuscripts both correct errors and standardize the Italian, losing most of its Mantuan character.

== Bibliography ==
- Albertazzi, Marco (2025) [2008]. Medieval Encyclopedias: History and Style of a Genre. Translated by Luca Pergol. Motilal Banarsidass.
- Keen, Elizabeth (2007). Journey of a Book: Bartholomew the Englishman and the Properties of Things. ANU E Press.
- McCall, Taylor (2018). "Disembodied: Additional MS. 8785 and the Tradition of Human Organ Depictions in Medieval Art and Medicine". Electronic British Library Journal. 20: 1–26.
- Ragni, Eugenio (1965). "Belcalzer, Vivaldo". Dizionario Biografico degli Italiani (in Italian). Vol. 7: Bartolucci–Bellotto. Rome: Istituto dell'Enciclopedia Italiana. ISBN 978-88-12-00032-6.
- Rhodes, Dennis E. (1956). Vivaldo Belcalzer and the Mantuan Dialect in the Early Fourteenth Century: A Study of B.M. Ms. Add. 8785 with an Edition of Books I, II and XV (PhD diss.). University of London.
