= Bartholomaeus Anglicus =

French Scholastic and encyclopedist

Bartholomaeus Anglicus (before 1203–1272), also known as Bartholomew the Englishman and Berthelet, was an early 13th-century scholastic of Paris and a member of the Franciscan order. He was the author of the compendium De proprietatibus rerum ("On the Properties of Things"), dated c.1240, an early forerunner of the encyclopedia and a widely cited book in the Middle Ages. Bartholomew also held senior positions within the church and was appointed Bishop of Łuków in what is now Poland, although he was not consecrated to that position.

== Life ==
Little is known of Bartholomew's early life. He is believed to have been born around the turn of the 13th century to unknown parents. The first record of him was in 1224 in Paris as a teacher, although he is also believed to have studied at Oxford University.

Bartholomew was elected as Minister of Austria in 1247 and was then elected as Minister of Bohemia in 1255. This appointment included Poland where he resolved a dispute between Duke Boleslaw and the Cathedral Chapter at Kraków. Pope Alexander IV appointed him as Papal legate north of the Carpathians in 1256 and appointed him as the Bishop of Łuków. However, he was probably not consecrated in that position due to the second Mongol invasion of Poland in 1259. Bartholomew was appointed as Minister at Saxonia in 1262 and served in that position until his death in 1272.

He was at some point confused with Bartholomeus de Glanvilla, another Franciscan friar who lived a century later.

== Works ==
=== De proprietatibus rerum ===
The work De proprietatibus rerum was written at the school of Magdeburg in Saxonia and intended for the use of students and the general public. Bartholomew carefully notes the sources for the material included, although, at present, it is sometimes impossible to identify or locate some of them. His annotations give a good idea of the wide variety of works available to a medieval scholar.

The work was later printed in numerous editions. Extracts were compiled by Robert Steele under the title Medieval Lore: an Epitome (1893). A critical edition of Trevisa's translation appeared in 1975.

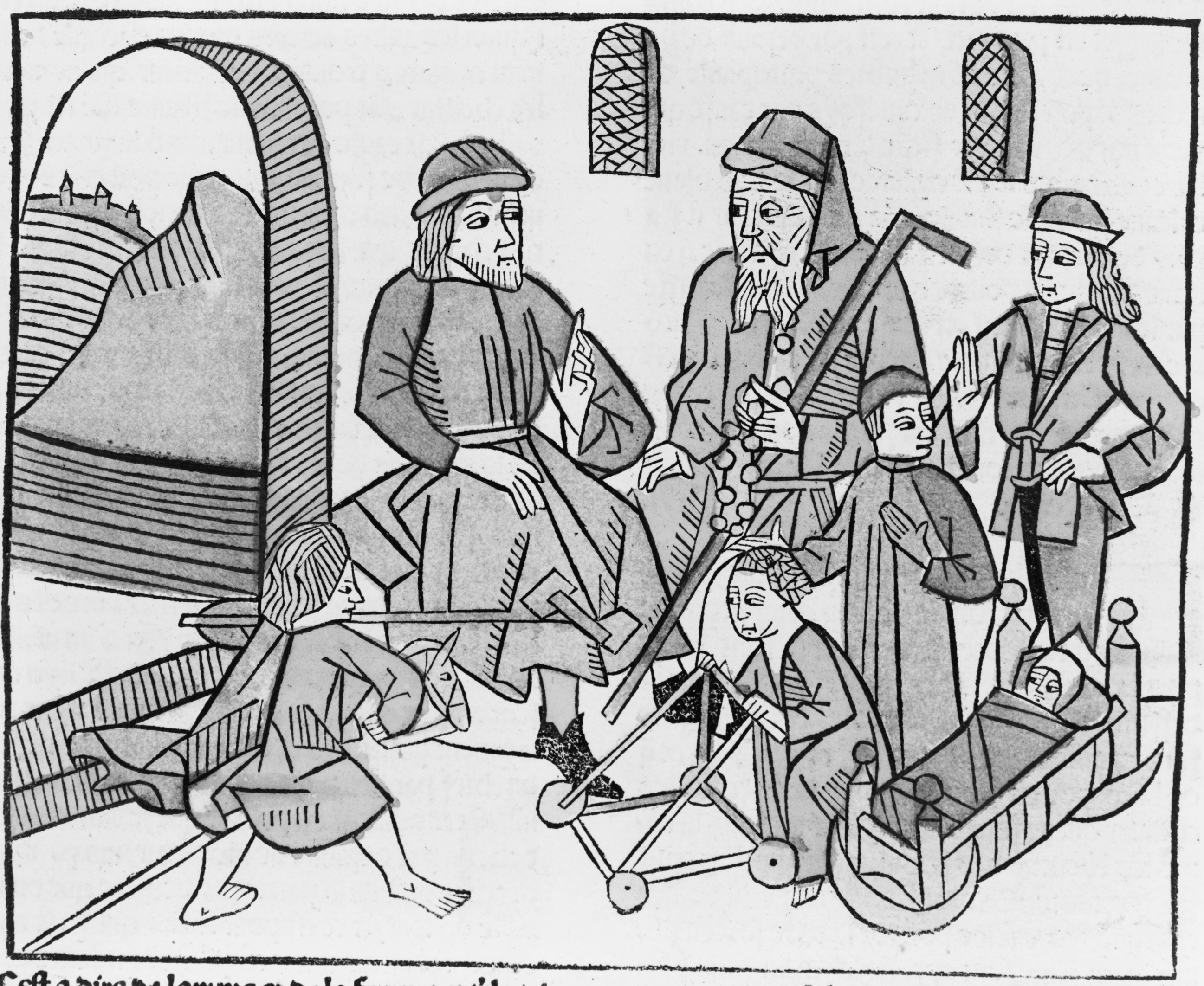
Stages of Life by Bartholomeus Anglicus (1486)

The work was organized in 19 books. The subjects of the books, in order, are God, angels (including demons), the human mind or soul, physiology, of ages (family and domestic life), medicine, the universe and celestial bodies, time, form and matter (elements), air and its forms, water and its forms, earth and its forms including geography, gems, minerals and metals, animals, and color, odor, taste and liquids.

- Book 1 De Deo On God and the names of God
- Book 2 De proprietatibus angelorum On angels, good and bad
- Book 3 De anima On the soul and reason
- Book 4 De humani corporis On the bodily humors
- Book 5 De hominis corpore On the parts of the body
- Book 6 De state hominis On daily life
- Book 7 De infirmitatibus On diseases and poisons
- Book 8 De mundo On earth and the heavenly bodies
- Book 9 De temporibus On time and motion
- Book 10 De materia et forma On matter, form and fire
- Book 11 De aere On the air and weather
- Book 12 De avibus On birds
- Book 13 De aqua On water and fishes
- Book 14 De terra On the earth and its surface
- Book 15 De regionibus et provinciis On regions and places
- Book 16 De lapidibus et metallis On rocks, gems and minerals
- Book 17 De herbis et arboribus On plants and trees
- Book 18 De animalibus On land animals
- Book 19 De accidentibus On colours, smells and tastes, substances, measurements, numbers and music

==== Sources ====
Sources as given by Robert Steele

- Origen Adamantius
- Gilles de Corbeil
- Alain de Lille
- Albertus Magnus
- Abu Ma'shar al-Balkhi
- Alcuin
- Alexander Neckam
- Ahmad ibn Muhammad ibn Kathīr al-Farghānī
- Alfred of Sareshel
- Al-Ghazali
- Ambrose
- Anselm of Canterbury
- Archelaus (geographer)
- Aristotle
- Augustine of Hippo Saint Augustine
- Aurora, The: A metrical version of the Bible by Petrus Riga
- Averroes
- Solomon ibn Gabirol
- Avicenna
- Haymo of Faversham (died 1244)
- Basil of Caesarea In Hexameron
- Bede (673–735). The work by which he was best known in the 13th century was not his History but the works on the Calendar, etc.
- Jean Beleth
- Bernard of Clairvaux
- Bestiarium: A collection of early myths on animals; of Eastern origin. There are many different forms of this work. All are founded on Physiologus.
- Boethius treatise on arithmetic
- Callisthenes pseudo: Alexander romance
- Cassiodorus De Septem Disciplinis
- Cato the Elder: On Agriculture
- Calcidius: A commentary on the Timaeus (dialogue) of Plato
- Cicero (107-44 BC). In SOMN. SCIPIONIS.
- Constantine the African He wrote the Viaticum and the Pantegna He introduced Arab medicine into Europe through the School of Salerno.
- Cyprian (died 285). A Syriac astrologer, afterwards Bishop of Antioch, and Martyr in the Diocletian persecution.
- DAMASCENE (11th century). Quoted by Constantinus Afer. A physician.
- John Damascene (end of 12th century). An Arab physician
- Damascius (c. 533). A Syrian commentator on Aristotle, who took refuge in Persia. Author of a work on wonders quoted by Photius
- Pedanius Dioscorides
- Pseudo-Dionysius the Areopagite: De Coelesti Hierarchia, and de divinis nominibus
- Aelius Donatus, grammarian
- EUFICIUS (c. 600). A disciple of Gregory
- Fabius Planciades Fulgentius or Fulgentius of Ruspe, grammarian
- Galen (131–210)
- Gilbertus Anglicus An English physician in France; wrote COMPENDIUM MEDICINAE.
- Pope Gregory I Moralia in Job
- HALY The first medical work translated by Constantius Afercanus
- HERMES. In ALCHEMIA (not now extant)
- Hippocrates (460-351 BC)
- Huguccio (died 1210). A jurisconsult and writer on grammar
- HYGINUS, PSEUDO- (6th century). Writer on astronomy?
- Pope Innocent III. (died 1216). Wrote "De Contemptu Mundi", etc.
- Isaac Israeli ben Solomon (c. 660). An Arab physician, who translated many Greek authors into Arabic
- Isidore of Seville (died 636). Bishop of Seville. He wrote a work on Etymology in 20 books, one of the most popular works of the Middle Age.
- Jacques de Vitry (died 1240). A crusading bishop, afterwards cardinal legate. Wrote an EXEMPLAR, and three books of Eastern and Western history.
- Jerome (340–420)
- Joseph ben Gorion (c. 900). Abridgment of Jewish history containing many legends
- Josephus (37–95). Jewish historian
- JORATH. DE ANIMALIBUS. A Syriac writer or could be Juba II of Mauretania.
- LAPIDARIUM. See MARBODIUS DE GEMMIS. There are many treatises under this name.
- Pope Leo IX. (1054). See Jacques Paul Migne, Patrologia.
- Lucan (died 65). One of the most popular Latin poets of the Middle Age
- Aemilius Macer (6th century). On THE VIRTUES OF HERBS The extant hexameter poem known as Floridus or De viribus (aut virtutibus) herbarum, traditionally ascribed to Macer, is actually a medieval production by Odo Magdunensis, a French physician.
- Macrobius (c. 409). His commentary on the dream of Scipio was a favourite work in medieval times.
- Martianus Capella (c. 400). Wrote a poem, THE MARRIAGE OF MERCURY AND PHILOLOGIA, treating of THE SEVEN LIBERAL ARTS, which was the standard text-book from the 5th century for the schools.
- Mashallah ibn Athari (c. 1100)
- METHODIUS, PSEUDO- (8th century). DE AGARINI
- Michael Scot (c. 1235). At this time concerned in the translation of some Arabic works on Astronomy, and Aristotle's DE COELO and DE MUNDO DE ANIMA, and HISTORIA NATURALIS with commentaries
- MISALATH ASTROLOGUS (?)
- Papias (lexicographer) (c. 1053). Grammarian. [Milan, 1467, etc.]
- Perspectiva Sciencia. According to Robert Steele this may be Bacon's, Peckham's, or Albertus Magnus', but he favours Peckham. Others say; Alhacen's De Aspectibus, a medieval Latin translation of Ibn al-Haytham's Kitab al-Manazir (Book of Optics), was first cited in this compendium, dated about 1240.
- Petrus Comestor (died 1198). Named MAGISTER HISTORIARUM or Master of Histories, wrote an account of the world from the Creation, which, when translated into French, was called the "Mer des Histoires". A favourite medieval book.
- PHILARETUS (1100). A writer on medicine. Date seems wrong here, redirects to Theophilus Protospatharius. The real Philaretus wrote on pulses.
- Physiologus. A Syriac compilation of moralities on animal myths. It first appears in Western Europe as THEOBALDUS DE NATURIS XII. ANIMALIUM. Of Alexandrian origin, it dates from before the 4th century, and appears to have been altered at the will of each writer.
- PLATEARIUS SALERNITANUS (c. 1100) was Johannes, one of a family of physicians at Salerno. His work is called the PRACTICA. A book on the virtues of herbs. [Lugd., 1525, etc.]
- Plato (430-348 BC). The Timaeus (dialogue) is quoted, probably from Chalcidius.
- Pliny (died 79). Natural history. This and Isidore's work are the two chief sources of medieval knowledge of Nature.
- Priscian (c. 525). Grammarian and physicist
- Ptolemy (c. 130). An Alexandrian astronomer, known through Arabic translations only at that time. [Ven., 1509, etc.]
- Rabanus Maurus (776–856) of Fulda, pupil of Alcuin. A Benedictine, afterwards Archbishop of Mayence, who wrote DE UNIVERSO MUNDO [1468; Col., 1627, etc.]
- Muhammad ibn Zakariya al-Razi (died 935). An Arab physician, perhaps the greatest of the School [Ven., 1548, etc.]
- Remigius of Auxerre (died 908). A teacher of grammar in the School of Paris. His grammar remained in use there four centuries. He wrote a gloss on Marcianus Capella.
- Richard of Saint Victor (died 1173). A Scottish theologian, prior of St. Victor. A mystic of considerable acuteness [Ven., 1506, etc.]
- Richard Rufus of Cornwall (c. 1225). A Cornishman who was a doctor in great renown, both at Oxford and Paris. He afterwards joined the Franciscans.
- Robert Grosseteste (died 1253), the celebrated Bishop of Lincoln and patron of Bacon. Taught at Paris and at Oxford. Commentaries on Aristotle.
- SALUSTIUS (died 363?). DE DIIS ET MUNDO. A geographer
- Schola Medica Salernitana (c. 1100). A treatise on the preservation of health in leonine verse for popular use, said to be addressed to Robert of England. It has been translated and commented on hundreds of times. The Middle Age very sensibly thought preservation from disease a branch of medicine equally important with the cure of it.
- SECUNDUS. A writer on Medicine. 4th century, used Pliny.
- Gaius Julius Solinus (c. 100). Wrote an account of things in general—POLYHISTORIA.
- STEPHANUS (c. 600). Commentary on Galen
- Walafrid Strabo (died 847). A Benedictine, Abbot of Reichenau, near Constance. One of the authors of the Gloss
- SYMON CORNUBIENSIS (?)
- Marcus Terentius Varro, M. T. (116-26 BC). Most celebrated grammarian
- Virgil (70-19 BC)
- William of Conches (died 1150). Lectured at Paris, 1139, on Grammar, wrote DE NATURA.
- Zeno of Cyprus (c. 400), A writer on medicine, and teacher at Alexandria

==== Translations ====
The original Latin work was translated into an Eastern Lombard dialect before 1309 by Vivaldo Belcazer, who also abridged it. The French translation of 1373 by Jean Corbechon was commissioned by King Charles V. An Occitan translation by Gaston Phoebus appeared around 1380. John Trevisa produced a Middle English translation in 1398. In the next century, translations appeared in Scandinavian vernaculars and a Dutch translation in 1485. The Spanish translation of Vicente de Burgos (c. 1494) was based on the French edition of Corbechon.

== Bibliography ==
- Albertazzi, Marco (2025) [2008]. Medieval Encyclopedias: History and Style of a Genre. Translated by Luca Pergol. Motilal Banarsidass.
- Keen, Elizabeth (2007). Journey of a Book: Bartholomew the Englishman and the Properties of Things. ANU E Press.
- Steele, Robert, ed. (1893). Medieval Lore: An Epitome of the Science, Geography, Animal and Plant Folk-lore and Myth of the Middle Age: Being Classified Gleanings from the Encyclopedia of Bartholomew Anglicus On the Properties of Things. E. Stock.
- Trevisa, John (1988). On the Properties of Things: John Trevisa's Translation of Bartholomaeus Anglicus, de Proprietatibus Rerum: A Critical Text. Oxford University Press. ISBN 0-19-818530-8.
