= Bartholomeus de Glanvilla =

Franciscan friar

Bartholomeus de Glanvilla was a Franciscan friar who died around 1360. He was at some point confused with Bartholomeus Anglicus, another Franciscan friar who lived a century earlier.
