= Svit se konča =

14th-century Croatian poem

- S(ve)t se kon'ča
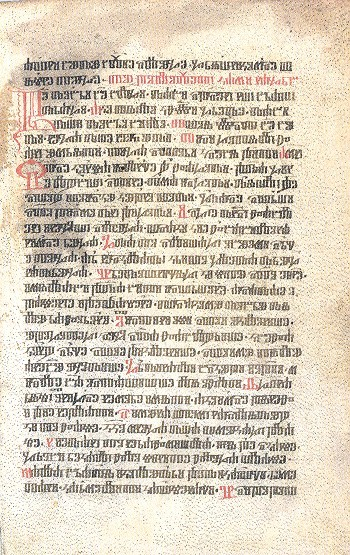
- Page from the songbook of Code slave 11, 1380
- Author(s): Anonymous
- Language: Old Croatian language, Chakavian-Ikavian dialect
- Date: c. 1320-1370
- Series: Paris songbook poems
- Manuscript(s): Code slave 11
- Genre: Satirical poem, dispute
- Verse form: Dodecasyllable
- Length: 13 stanzas, 49 lines
- Subject: Corruption, clergy, apocalypse

"Svit se konča" (transl. 'The light is dying away' or 'The World Ends') is a 14th-century poem written in old Chakavian Croatian language. The poem is most commonly described as a satire on the life of clergy, criticizing the corruption within the Catholic Church. Written in 13 stanzas of 3-4 predominantly dodecasyllabic verses, it is regarded as the oldest and most prominent example of early Croatian secular poetry during the Middle Ages. It is preserved in the 1380 Glagolithic codex Code slave 11 (also known as the 'Paris codex'), among the collection of other poems contained at the end, though the poem itself is dated earlier than the manuscript, either to 1320 or 1370. Its exact authorship is unknown, but some scholars associate it with the začinjavci literary tradition.

== Description ==
The poem's subject matter deals with the corruption of the world caused by a fear of the impending judgment day. Because of this, the author strongly condemns the hypocrisy and deviation of the religious classes, from the lowest, right up to the Inquisition. Some analysts interpret the poem as a clash between two conflicting principles, as its characters are symbolic, rather than allegorical. It belongs to a group of medieval poems not intended for the common people, but seems to have been written with specific literary intent by the unknown author. Some authors describe it as anti-clerical.

Folk elements are present in its diction and style such as parts of verses "Obuje mi srce tuga" or "skot bi pasli i orali" which are reminiscent of Octosyllabic verses from folk songs. Similarly, "krivo gleda drug na druga" is a folk syntagm.

Structurally, it is an attestation of twelve-syllable verses being in use in these areas since at least the 14th century and its mature versification techniques point to an already existing practice of writing this kind of poetry.

== Reception and influence ==
Literary historians state that the poem uses a demanding form and artistic skill to convey an "exceptional testimony of an intimate experience of a world sinking into darkness, suppressing known Christian ideals".

The poem is said to have influenced later authors, most notably the Renaissance poet Marko Marulić, also known to have relied on dodecasyllabic verses in his Croatian works. Radoslav Katičić notes that even more modern authors took influence from the poem, such as Miroslav Krleža in his Ballads of Petrica Kerempuh.
