= 1377 in literature =

== Events ==
- May 10 – A deputy is appointed to take charge of Geoffrey Chaucer’s duties at customs, Chaucer being busy with diplomatic business. Chaucer makes two trips to France in the course of this year.
- Ibn Khaldun begins work on the Muqaddimah.
- Nicole Oresme is elected bishop of Lisieux. Oresme's French translations from Latin versions of Aristotle are an important contribution to the development of the French language.
- Ali ibn Mohammed al-Jurjani returns to Shiraz from Constantinople to become a teacher.
- Production of the earliest known copy of the Laurentian Codex.
- Scottish poet John Barbour is rewarded for his latest work with ten pounds Scots.

== Births ==
- May 2 - Oswald von Wolkenstein, Austrian poet (died 1445)

== Deaths ==
- April - Guillaume de Machaut, French poet and composer (born c.1300)
