= List of works of fiction set in the 14th century =

The following works of fiction are based in the 14th century:

== Drama ==
- Gordon Daviot – Richard of Bordeaux
- William Shakespeare – Richard II

== Historical novels ==
- Arthur Conan Doyle
  - Sir Nigel
  - The White Company
- Umberto Eco – The Name of the Rose
- Ismail Kadare - The Three-Arched Bridge (Ura Me Tri Harqe)
- Anya Seton – Katherine
- Nigel Tranter
  - Robert the Bruce trilogy
  - Flowers of Chivalry
  - Courting Favour
  - Lords of Misrule
- Ronald Welch - Bowman of Crécy

== Science fiction novels ==
- Poul Anderson – The High Crusade – Sir Roger, Baron de Tourneville, captures a scouting craft for the Wersgorix Empire in 1345. His force and the village of Ansby are then taken to the Empire.
- Daphne du Maurier – The House on the Strand – A scientist travels back in time to the 14th century.
- Michael Crichton – Timeline – A group of historians travels to 14th-century France.
