= The Ointment Seller =

Medieval Bohemian play

- Author: Anonymous
- Original title: 'Mastičkář, Unguentarius'
- Translator: Jarmila F. Veltrusky
- Language: Czech and Latin
- Genre: play
- Publication date: c. 1340s
- Publication place: Bohemia

The Ointment Seller (Mastičkář, Unguentarius) is a medieval Bohemian play written in a mix of Czech and Latin. Two incomplete extant fragments tell the story of a merchant (the ointment seller) who with the assistance of his apprentice convinces three ladies called Mary to buy his unguents. In the process, the merchant performs a “resurrection” and fights with his wife, and his assistant also gets into a fight. Peppered with obscenities and foreign words, the play is regarded as a farce mocking socially subordinate groups, including Jews, Germans, and women.

== Historical background ==
During the 14th century, religious ceremony previously associated with liturgy was incorporated into a type of drama performed outside the Church. These plays, as is true of The Ointment Seller, were often written in both Czech and Latin. Undergoing a process of secularization, what were once religious plays became performances that were not only performed outside the Church, but also included content that strayed from the sacred and moved closer to the profane. Secular drama, unlike the ecclesiastical drama preceding it, belonged during this time to the oral tradition and contemporary Slavic scholars are thus left with little to investigate from medieval Bohemia. The Ointment Seller – a play full of scatological humor and obscenities – is considered to be one of the most important secular texts from 14th century Bohemia.

== Characters ==
Rubin
Merchant
Pusterpalk
The three Marys
Abraham and his son Isaac
Merchant's wife

== Plot summary ==
There are two extant fragments of this manuscript. This plot summary pertains to "The Museum Fragment (Muzejní Zlomek)."

The play begins with Rubin approaching the Merchant and telling him that he will gladly serve him if the Merchant gives him a pot of barley porridge and three new spoons. The Merchant agrees to provide these goods if Rubin helps him find a place to set up a stall to sell his ointments. Rubin then starts to sing a song with Pusterpalk extolling the virtues of the Merchant's ointments, and continues after the song to praise the Merchant and his ability to cure sicknesses of all kinds. Rubin runs off amongst the people and the Merchant, not able to find him, calls for him repeatedly. When Rubin returns to him, the Merchant asks him to take out the ointments and enumerate them for him. Among these ointments is one that is "so precious that neither Vienna nor Prague has it:

A young lady made it
all out of gnat lard,
she added a few farts to it
so that it should not quickly spoil;
that's the one all praise most keenly."

The Merchant suggests after some time that they should set up their stall somewhere else since no customers are coming. Rubin then tells him that he has heard that there are three ladies in town seeking good ointments. The three ladies – all named Mary – are standing in the crowd and Rubin calls them over. The Marys ask for ointment to anoint their Lord Jesus Christ's body. At this point Abraham appears carrying his son Isaac and asks the Merchant to heal him and make him rise from the dead. The Merchant agrees but only if Abraham gives him gold and his daughter, to which Abraham agrees. The Merchant proceeds to pour feces over Isaac's backside. Isaac then rises and gives thanks to the Merchant for healing him. The Marys continue to request ointment to anoint Jesus Christ. The Merchant asks for two talents of gold instead of three as usual and the Merchant's wife then yells angrily at him for offering the ointment for less gold, blaming him for their poverty. To his wife's outburst, the Merchant exclaims:

"I would advise you to stop,
to let me be in peace.
And if you do not stop it
maybe you will rise and go away from me in tears.
Busy yourself with your distaff at once,
or I will punch you in the face!"

Rubin and Pusterpalk then have a conversation about their lineage and get into an argument, whereby the Merchant tells the Marys not to pay attention to their fighting. This is how the Museum Fragment ends.

== Interpretations ==
Literary criticism on this play is scant, though the works written about it are helpful and illuminate much in the play that might strike a modern reader as incomprehensible. Scholar Jarmila F. Veltrusky has analyzed the play in the framework of a Bakhtinian model of "carnival", arguing that apparent conflicts in the play between the profane and the sacred function as non-hierarchical mockery of various groups in society. Scholar Alfred Thomas interprets the obscenity and farcical elements of the play in a different light, pointing out how these features are used to uphold notions of outsiders and insiders. In Thomas's analysis, society as a whole is not mocked, but rather specific groups and cultures, namely women, Jews and Germans – who are all vilified as the "Other" by means of obscene inversion.

== Secondary sources ==
- Obscenity: Social Control and Artistic Creation in the European Middle Ages, Ed. Jan M. Ziolkowski (Brill, 1998).
- Thomas, Alfred. Anne's Bohemia: Czech Literature and Society, 1310-1420 (University of Minnesota Press, 1998).
- Veltrusky, Jarmila F. Mastičkář: A Sacred Farce from Medieval Bohemia (Ann Arbor, 1985).
