= Jean Beleth =

French liturgist and theologian (fl. 1135–1182)

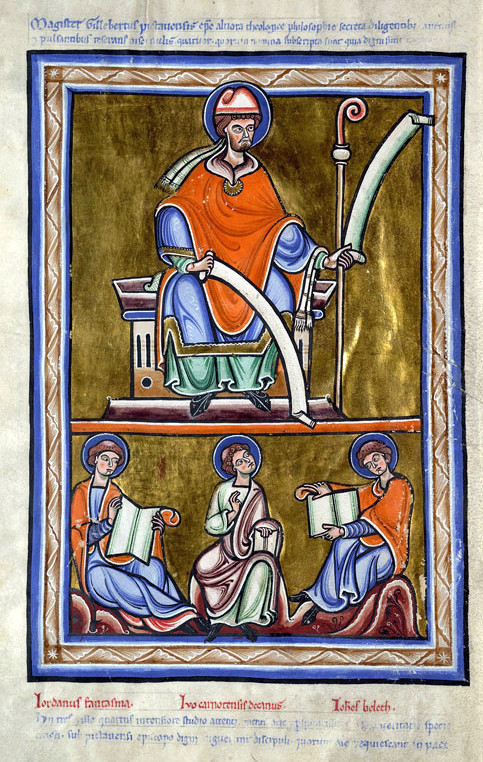
- Gilbert de la Porrée and his students, Jean Beleth is the last one on the right

Academic work
- Discipline: theology
- Notable works: Summa de Ecclesiasticis Officiis

Jean Beleth (Latin: Joannes Belethus; fl. 1135–1182) was a twelfth-century French liturgist and theologian. He is thought to have been rector in a Paris theological college. That he was possibly of English origin was a hypothesis discussed by John Pits, and supported by Thomas Tanner; but is no longer taken seriously.

== Life ==
Beleth is recorded at Tiron in 1135, studying at Chartres around that time, probably teaching theology in Paris, and recorded in 1182 at Amiens.

== Works ==
His Summa de Ecclesiasticis Officiis is a manual and now a source for the Christian liturgy of his time; it was later printed (Rationale divinorum officiorum), and has been dated to 1162.

== Jean Belet de Vigny ==
The 19th-century editions of the Encyclopædia Britannica claimed that Jean Belet de Vigny (fl. 14th century) edited many important works including the edition and translation into French of the hagiography known as the Legenda Sanctorum (Golden Legend). Considering that one of the original authors of the hagiography most frequently named is one "Johannes Beleth", it is more likely that the 14th-century first French edition was a translation from a version of the Golden Legend written by Beleth.
