= Nuremberg Mahzor =

1331 Jewish prayer book

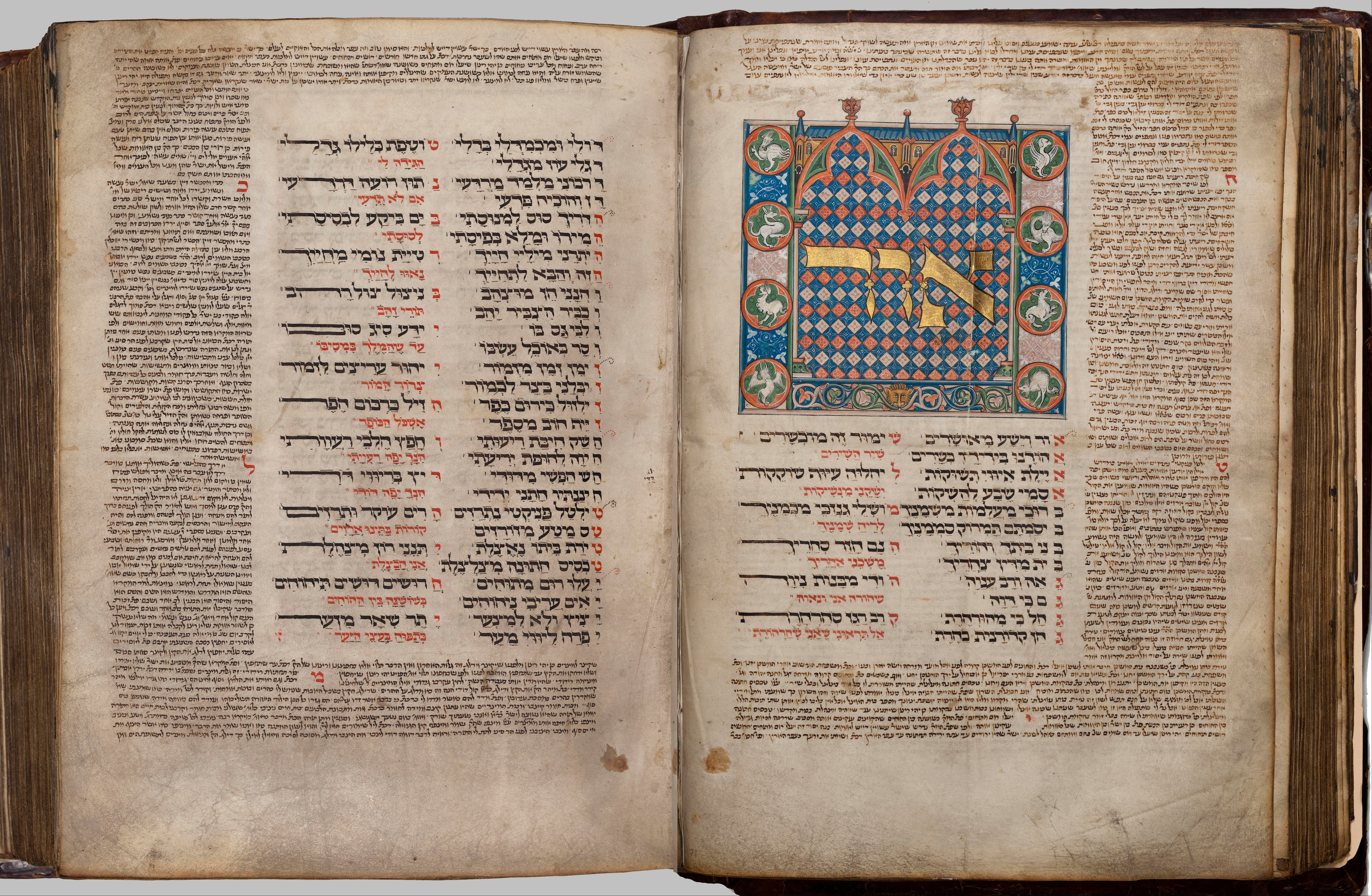

The Nuremberg Mahzor is a 14th-century manuscript of the siddur according to the 'Eastern' Ashkenazi rite. Written in 1331, the ornamental manuscript includes the Jewish services for all occasions throughout the year, together with commentaries (in the margins) which have never been published.

The manuscript was written on parchment and, at 20 inches high by 14 inches wide, and weighing more than 57 pounds (26 kilograms), is one of the largest and heaviest codices to have survived anywhere. It contains 521 folios.

The illuminated Nuremberg Mahzor contains prayers and piyyutim for the whole year according to the Eastern Ashkenazi (Austrian) rite, the five Megillot and the Haftarot.

The Nuremberg Mahzor got its name from its home for more than 300 years – the Nuremberg municipal library in Germany.

The manuscript was originally commissioned for private study and synagogue use by a Jewish patron, probably in Regensburg. Its early history is not known. From the middle of the 17th century until 1951 the manuscript was in the possession of the Nuremberg Municipal Library.

In 1951, Salman Schocken, a German-Jewish publisher and book collector, purchased the Nuremberg Mahzor and brought it to Israel. The Nuremberg municipality used the money paid for the manuscript to replenish its municipal library after World War II. Since then it was stored for 50 years in the Schocken Institute for Jewish Studies in Jerusalem. During that time it went only once on public display. In 2007 the manuscript was purchased by the private collector Dr. David Jeselsohn, Zurich.

In the 19th century, 11 leaves were removed from the prayer book, probably for sale. Modern scholarship does not follow the 19th century assumption that soldiers from Napoleon's army committed the theft. Schocken acquired four of the missing leaves in the 1930s after he fled Nazi Germany. One leaf, who was in a private collection, has been purchased by Jeselsohn in 2010. Six leaves are still missing.

Immediately after the purchase of the Nuremberg Mahzor by Dr. Jeselsohn, the whole book has been scanned by the Jewish National and University Library in Jerusalem. and after a six-months restoration at the Israel Museum laboratories it went on display at the Israel Museum's Shrine of the Book in Jerusalem from September 2009 through February 2010.

Thereafter it became part of the permanent exhibits of the Israel Museum until 2023, when a court decided against the Israel Antiquities Authority that the Mahzor must be returned to its owner outside Israel.

== Style and importance ==
The Nuremberg Mahzor is described as a "unique cultural object from the Middle Ages". It was written in calligraphic script by a scribe who is assumed to be a professional artist. The style of illumination is that of the Upper Rhine valley.
