= 1376 in literature =

== Events ==
- July 22 – Fabled date of the appearance of the Pied Piper of Hamelin.
- December 25 – Geoffrey Chaucer goes abroad on secret state business in the company of Sir John Burley.

== Births ==
- Gihwa, Buddhist scholar (died 1433)
- Fernán Pérez de Guzmán, Spanish historian and poet (died 1458)

== Deaths ==
- None
