= Syntagma Canonum =

Medieval canonical collection

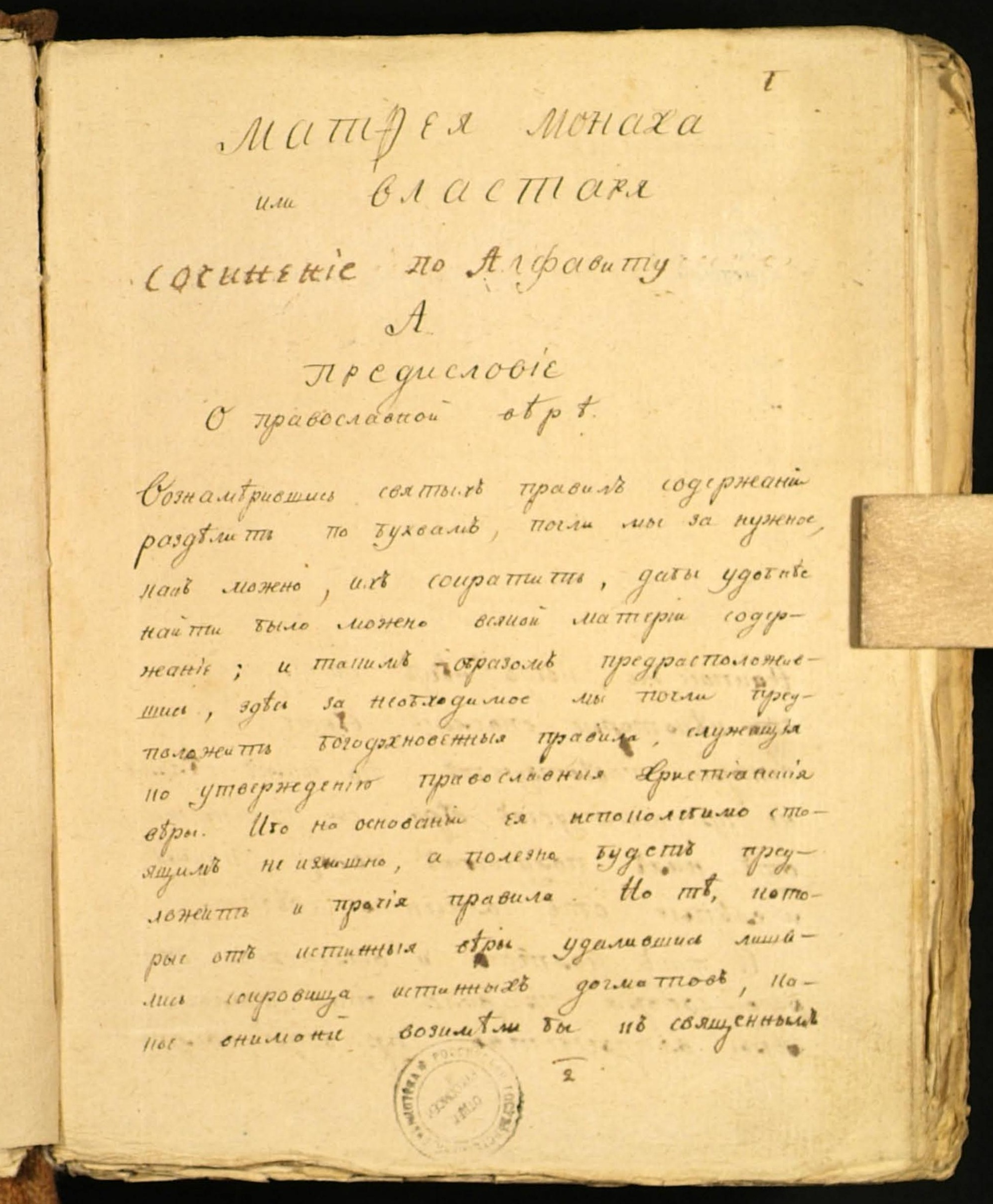
18th-century copy of the Syntagma

Syntagma Canonum is a canon law collection made in 1335 by Matthew Blastares, a Greek monk about whose life nothing certain is known.

== Contents ==
The collector aimed at reducing canon law to a handier and more accessible form than it appeared in the Nomocanon of Photius, and to give a more comprehensive presentation than the epitomes and synopses of earlier writers such as Stephen (fifth century), Aristenus (1160), Arsenius (1255), et al. The author arranged his matter in alphabetical order. He made 24 general divisions, each marked off by a letter of the Greek alphabet. These sections he subdivided into 303 titles, themselves distinguished by letters; for example, the third section contains such topics as: peri gamou (about marriage), peri gynaikon (about women), etc. The titles ordinarily treat of the civil law (nomoi politikoi), as well as ecclesiastical law. Some titles however are purely ecclesiastical, others purely civil. The work also contains a small Latin glossary of specialized legal terms.

The church ordinances are quoted from previous collections, especially from the Nomocanon (883), while the extracts from the civil law are for the most part transcribed without any reference to their origin.

== Reception ==
The compilation soon came into general use among the clergy, and preserved its authority even under Ottoman rule. A translation into Serbian followed close upon its first publication. It even worked its way into the political life of the Serbian people through an abridgment which Serbian Emperor Dušan appended to his code of laws (1349). From this the purely ecclesiastical enactments were excluded, but the civil law contained in the Syntagma was reproduced whenever adaptable to the social condition of the people. In the sixteenth century the Syntagma Canonum was translated into Bulgarian; in the seventeenth century into Russian.
