= 1375 in literature =

== Events ==
- Charles IV, Holy Roman Emperor, commissions a Landbuch, a survey of his possessions.

== New books ==
- John Barbour – The Brus
- Catalan Atlas, attributed to Cresques Abraham

== Births ==
- probable – Juan Alfonso de Baena, troubadour (died c. 1434)

== Deaths ==
- February 9 – Chūgan Engetsu, Japanese poet (born 1300)
- December 21 – Giovanni Boccaccio, Italian writer (born 1313)
