= Matthew Blastares =

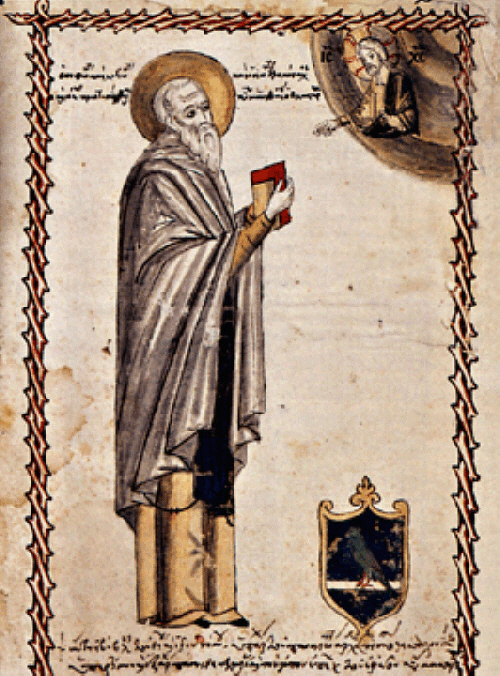
Miniature representation of Blastares

Matthew Blastares (Greek: Ματθαῖος Βλαστάρης or Βλάσταρις, romanized: Matthaios Blastares/Blastaris; fl. 1240-1360) was a 14th-century Byzantine Greek monk in Thessalonica and early scholarly opponent of reconciliation with Rome. He was also the writer of the Syntagma Canonum.

== Life ==
Blastares was a hieromonk in the monastery of Kyr Isaac in Thessalonica, where he died after 1346.

== Works ==
He is best known for his Syntagma kata stoicheion (lit. 'Alphabetical Treatise'), completed in 1335. The chief innovation of the Syntagma was Blastares' ambition was to reconcile canon law with civil law, whereas previous treatises had focused on one of the two, ignoring the other.

The Syntagma is subdivided into 24 sections, each on a specific legal topic, and usually further subdivided into chapters. It became very popular even outside the Byzantine Empire, and was translated into Serbian during the Serbian Empire of Stephen Dushan.

Apart from the Syntagma, Blastares was also the author of a number of other legal works, including a lexicon of Latin legal terms, and summaries of the nomocanons of Niketas of Heraclea, patriarchs Nikephoros I and John Nesteutes. His further work includes a poem on the offices and titles of the Byzantine court, a synopsis of rhetoric; theological treatises against the Latin Church, azymes, the Jews, and Palamism; a work on Divine Grace; a letter to Constantine II Lusignan on the Holy Spirit; as well as liturgical hymns and epigrams.

== Sources ==
- Kazhdan, Alexander (1991). "Blastares, Matthew". In Kazhdan, Alexander (ed.). The Oxford Dictionary of Byzantium. Oxford and New York: Oxford University Press. p. 295. ISBN 0-19-504652-8.
- Trapp, Erich; Beyer, Hans-Veit; Walther, Rainer; Sturm-Schnabl, Katja; Kislinger, Ewald; Leontiadis, Ioannis; Kaplaneres, Sokrates (1976–1996). Prosopographisches Lexikon der Palaiologenzeit (in German). Vienna: Verlag der Österreichischen Akademie der Wissenschaften. ISBN 3-7001-3003-1.
