= John Trevisa =

English Bible translator (1342–1402)

- Born: John Trevisa; 1342; Trevessa, St. Enoder parish, England
- Died: 1402 (aged 59–60)
- Occupations: Theologian, writer, translator, vicar and canon
- Employer: Queen's College, Oxford

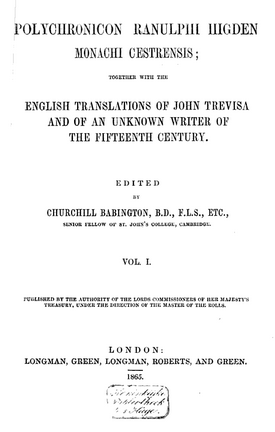
Polychronicon Ranulphi Higdin, Monachi Cestrensis, 1865

John Trevisa (or John of Trevisa; Latin: Ioannes Trevisa; fl. 1342–1402 AD) was a Cornish writer and professional translator.

Trevisa was born at Trevessa in the parish of St Enoder in mid-Cornwall, in Britain and was a native Cornish speaker. He was educated at Exeter College, Oxford, and became Vicar of Berkeley, Gloucestershire, chaplain to the 5th Lord Berkeley, and Canon of Westbury on Trym.

He translated into English for his patron the Latin Polychronicon of Ranulf Higden, adding remarks of his own, and prefacing it with a Dialogue on Translation between a Lord and a Clerk. He likewise made various other translations, including Bartholomaeus Anglicus' On the Properties of Things (De Proprietatibus Rerum), a medieval forerunner of the encyclopedia. It seems likely that he was the translator of the Bible into Cornish, a language, which until recently, was thought not to have possessed a bible translation.

A fellow of The Queen's College, Oxford, from 1372 to 1376 at the same time as John Wycliff and Nicholas of Hereford, Trevisa may well have been one of the contributors to the Early Version of Wycliffe's Bible. The preface to the King James Version of 1611 singles him out as a translator amongst others at that time: "even in our King Richard the second's days, John Trevisa translated them [the Gospels] into English, and many English Bibles in written hand are yet to be seen that divers translated, as it is very probable, in that age". Trevisa does not seem to have been a Wycliffite or Lollard, though he had some views in common about corruption.

Subsequently, he translated a number of books of the Bible into French for Lord Berkeley, including a version of the Book of Revelation, which his patron had written up onto the ceiling of the chapel at Berkeley Castle. Trevisa's reputation as a writer rests principally on his translations of encyclopaedic works from Latin into English, undertaken with the support of his patron, Thomas (IV), the fifth Baron Berkeley, as a continuous programme of enlightenment for the laity.

John Trevisa is the 18th most frequently cited author in the Oxford English Dictionary and the third most frequently cited source for the first evidence of a word (after Geoffrey Chaucer and the Philosophical Transactions of the Royal Society).
