= Ranulf Higden =

English chronicler and Benedictine monk (c. 1280–1364)

Higdon
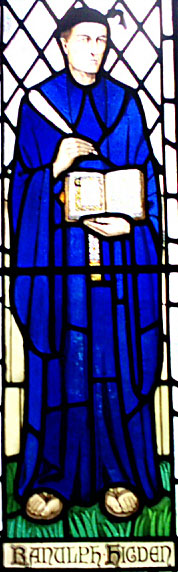
- Ranulph Higden window
- Born: Ranulf Higden c 1280; West England
- Died: 12 March 1364 n/a
- Resting place: Chester Cathedral
- Occupations: Monk and theology scribe
- Employer: Benedictine Abbey in Chester

Ranulf Higden or Higdon (c. 1280–1363 or 1364) was an English chronicler and a Benedictine monk who wrote the Polychronicon, a Late Medieval magnum opus. Higden resided at the monastery of St. Werburgh in Chester after taking his monastic vow at Benedictine Abbey in Chester in 1299. Later in life he travelled to visit and counsel with King Edward III. Higden's remains are buried in Chester Cathedral.

Higden wrote many works, including the Polychronicon, Ars componendi sermones, and Speculum curatorum. Higden began compiling the Polychronicon, a seven-book series about world history written in Latin, during the reign of Edward III. He is sometimes associated with the Chester Plays, but there is also doubt surrounding this association. Ars componendi sermones and Speculum curatorum address religious topics.

== Biography ==
Ranulf Higden was born in about 1280 and is believed to have been born in the West of England. He joined St. Werburgh abbey in Chester, England in 1299. There, he may have worked in the abbey library and managed its scriptorium. He was also a preacher and taught other preachers. Already a known historian, Higden was invited to visit Edward III in August of 1352; during this visit he was under direction to bring Polychronicon and speak with the king's council. Higden was a part of the abbey for 64 years until his death. His death has been said to be between 1363 and 1364; in March 1363; on March 12, 1364; sometime during 1364; or around the feast of St. Gregory. He is buried in Chester Cathedral.

== His works ==
=== Polychronicon ===
Higden authored a chronicle commonly called Polychronicon, which name comes from the longer title Ranulphi Castrensis, cognomine Higden, Polychronicon (sive Historia Polycratica) ab initio mundi usque ad mortem regis Edwardi III in septem libros dispositum. The work is divided into seven books, in imitation of the seven days of Genesis, and, with exception of the first book, is a summary of general history. V. H. Galbraith described it as 'the most exhaustive universal history produced in medieval times and...the best seller of its age.' It belonged to St. Werburgh's Abbey during Higden's lifetime and was kept in the monastic library until the abbey shut down in 1540.

The first book consists of 60 chapters and provides a geographical survey of the world. It starts with a prologue and a list of sourced authors. Its content covers Asia, Africa and Europe and concludes with several chapters describing Great Britain. It relates events from the Creation to Nebuchadnezzar (Book 2); the birth of Christ (Book 3); the arrival of the Saxons in England (Book 4); the arrival of the Danes in England (Book 5); the Norman Conquest (Book 6); and the reign of Edward III (Book 7). The first letters of each chapter create the acrostic presentem cronicam conpilavit Frater Ranulphus Cestrensis monachis.

E. Barber, who was the Archdeacon of Chester, described the text as a 'pleasant, easy-going Universal History' but not 'critical or scientific, or really historical.' While some people thought that Higden's writing was plagiarised from a man named Roger Higden, Edward Maunde Thompson thought that Roger Higden could have been the same person as Ranulf Higden. Francis J. Haverfield also acknowledged the possibility, but also thought that 'Higden was a great plagiarist'; he wrote that plagiarising was not unusual for histories produced in Higden's time. Higden may have written the work to 1340 or 1342, later adding content up to 1352 or 1355 and perhaps beyond. Later, Polychronicon was extended to 1387.

John Trevisa translated the text into English in 1387. Another translation was written by an anonymous writer in the 15th. century. Trevisa's version was revised and printed by Caxton in 1482, who added an eighth book containing content up to 1467.One section in Book 1 from the Latin text was published in a compilation assembled by Thomas Gale in 1691. The Polychronicon was a well-known text in the years it was reprinted and revised. The Polychronicon was edited for the Rolls Series and included the English translations as well as extensions of the history. This edition was criticised by Mandell Creighton, who wrote that the editing was done in a 'perfunctory manner' and that the additions to the Polychronicon added little to the history. There are over 100 copies of the Latin or English versions held by libraries in the UK, Belgium, Ireland, the USA, France, Spain, and the Vatican City.

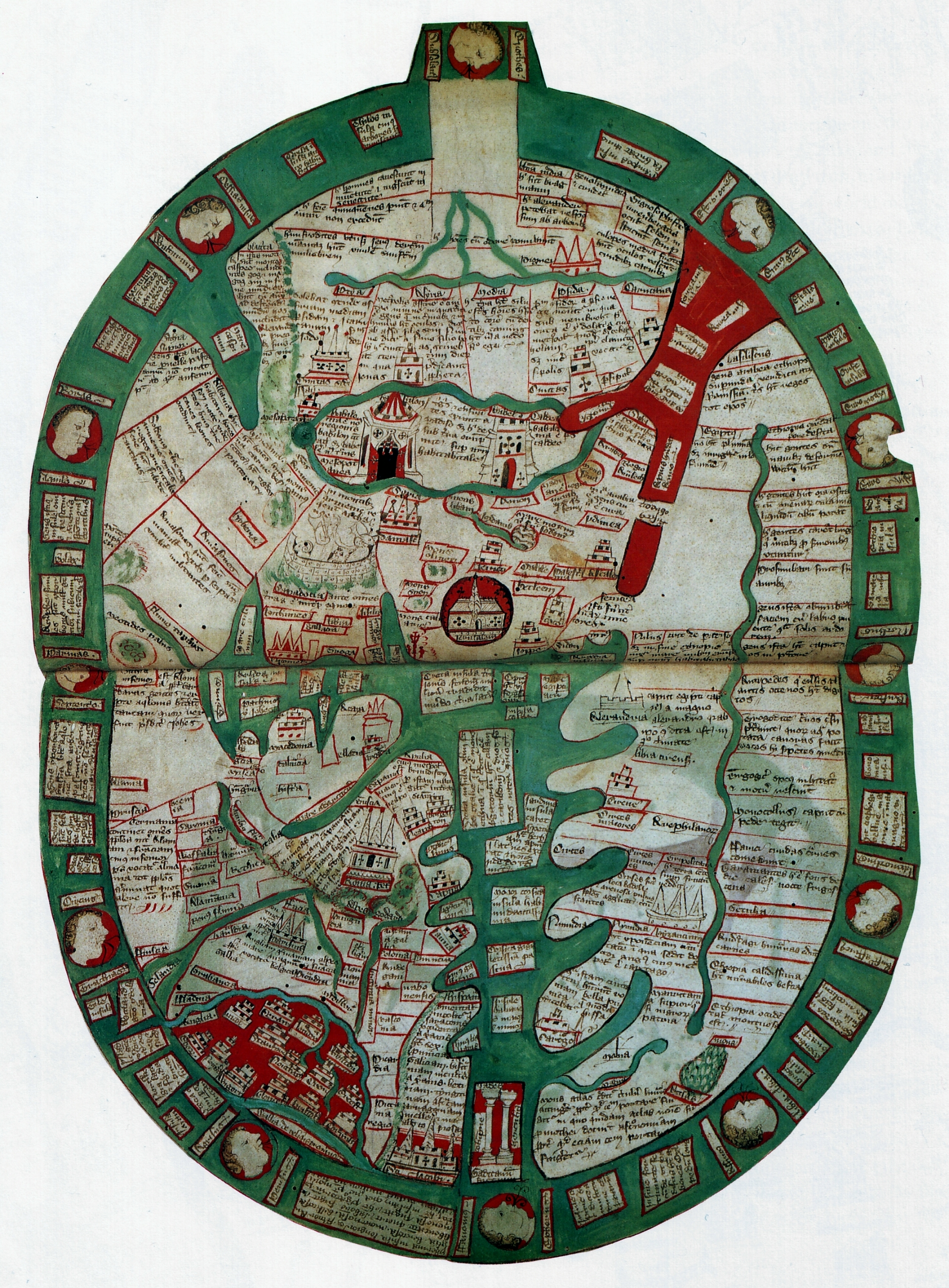
World map in a late 14th-century manuscript of Ranulf's Polychronicon (British Library). East is at the top and Jerusalem at the centre; the Red Sea at top right is coloured red.

=== Chester Plays ===
Over time, after Higden’s death the Chester Plays were attributed to him with possible variations of his name. One of the name variations, Randal Higgenet, may not be the same person as Ranulf Higden, according to A. W. Pollard and Thomas Warton. Higden’s contemporaries, Joseph C. Bridge says, made no mention of Higden writing the plays. One argument, made by author John Taylor, against Higden as the author of the plays is that the plays are written in English; most literature at the time was usually in French or Latin, and Benedictine monks translated other types of documents into English.

=== Other works ===
==== Ars componendi sermones ====
In Ars componendi sermones Higden outlines the qualities a preacher should have and describes Christ using several metaphors. Popular in the 14th. century, this text guides preachers on how to choose and write sermons, as well as gives sermon suggestions for different occasions. A recent translation of Ars componendi sermones, done by Margaret Jennings and Sally A. Wilson, was published in 2003.

==== Speculum curatorum ====
In Speculum curatorum Higden writes about a variety of topics, including Christ’s teachings in the New Testament and divination. Much of the text is compiled from De Universo and De Legibus by William of Auvergne; in this text, Higden’s sourced authors go uncited. After writing the text, Higden expanded it. V. H. Galbraith wrote that Speculum curatorum as well as Higden’s other theological writings are ‘of no great distinction.’

== List of works ==
- Polychronicon Ranulphi Higden monachi cestrensis (c. 1327-55)
- Speculum curatorum (1340, 1350)
- Ars kalendarii (c. 1340)
- Determinationes super compendio (c. 1340)
- Distinctiones theologicae (c. 1340)
- Expositio super Job (c. 1340)
- In Cantica canticorum (c. 1340)
- Pedagorium artis grammaticae (c. 1340)
- Sermones per annum (c. 1340)
- Ars componendi sermones (c. 1346)

=== Attributed ===
- Distinctiones
- Distinctiones Cestrensis monachi
- Abbreviationes chronicorum (c. 1355)

== See also ==
- Adam of Usk

== Works cited ==
- Babington, Churchill; Lumby, J. Rawson, eds. (1865). Polychronicon Ranulphi Higden, Monachi Cestrensis; Together With the English Translations of John Trevisa and of an Unknown Writer of the Fifteenth Century. Vol. 1. Rolls Series.
- Barber, E (1903). "The Discovery of Ralph Higden's Tomb". Journal of the Chester Archaeological Society. New Series. 9: 115–128. doi:10.5284/1069970.
- Beal, Jane (2018). "Preaching and History: The Audience of Ranulf Higden's Ars componendi sermones and Polychronicon". Medieval Sermon Studies. 62 (1). Routledge Taylor & Francis Group: 17–28. doi:10.1080/13660691.2018.1529891. ISSN 1366-0691 – via EBSCO Host.
- Bridge, Joseph (1903). "The Chester Miracle Plays: Some Facts concerning Them, and the Supposed Authorship of Ralph Higden". Journal of the Chester Archaeological Society. New Series. 9: 59–98. doi:10.5284/1069968.
- Creighton, Mandell, ed. (1888). The English Historical Review. Vol. 3. Longmans, Green, and Co. – via Internet Archive.
- Crook, Eugene J. "Introduction to Ranulph Higden's Distinctiones". Dallas Medieval Texts & Translations.
- Fowler, David C. (1976). "Universal History: The Polychronicon". The Bible in Early English Literature. University of Washington Press. pp. 194–246. ISBN 0-295-95438-8.
- Galbraith, V. H. (1959). "An Autograph MS of Ranulph Higden's 'Polychronicon'". Huntington Library Quarterly. 23 (1): 1–18. doi:10.2307/3816473. JSTOR 3816473.
- Giles, Cynthia (2016). Trudeau, Lawrence J. (ed.). "Higden, Ranulf (c. 1280-1364), An Introduction to". Classical and Medieval Literature Criticism. 179: 83–86 – via Gale Literature Criticism.
- Grandsen, Antonia (1977). "Silent Meanings in Ranulf Higden's Polychronicon and in Thomas Elmham's Liber Metricus de Henrico Quinto". Medium Ævum. 46 (2). JSTOR 43628270.
- SCA Staff (25 September 2023). "Spotlight on: Caxton's Polychronicon". Manuscripts and More: Special Collections & Archives at the University of Liverpool Library. University of Liverpool.
- Schmidt, Michael (2014). "Literature is Invention". The Novel: A Biography. Harvard University Press, Belknap Press. pp. 17–24. doi:10.2307/j.ctt6wprpn. ISBN 978-0-674-72473-0. JSTOR j.ctt6wprpn.
- Taylor, John (1966). The Universal Chronicle of Ranulf Higden. Oxford University Press. ISBN 0198116276.
